= ESPN Full Court =

- Country: United States

Programming
- Language(s): English

Ownership
- Owner: ESPN Inc.

History
- Launched: November 1, 2007
- Closed: August 28, 2015
- Replaced by: ESPN College Extra

ESPN Full Court was an out-of-market sports package in the United States that carried college basketball games. The package consisted of about 150 games annually, from the season tipoff in November to the first two rounds of the NCAA Women's Division I Basketball Championship in mid- to late-March. The suggested retail price was $109 for the entire season, $75 for a half-season (only available in late January), and $19.95 for a single day. The season package was renewable. Full-season packages were not available for the online version.

On August 28, 2015, the channel was replaced by ESPN College Extra and the package was much less promoted or available than it has been in the past with the drawing down of pay-per-view to select special events; all of Full Court's events are available through WatchESPN via various ESPN3 streams without cost through TV Everywhere authentication.

== Other Out-of-Market / pay-per-view sports packages ==
- NFL Sunday Ticket
- MLB Extra Innings
- NBA League Pass
- NHL Center Ice
- NASCAR Hot Pass
- ESPN GamePlan
- MLS Direct Kick
