= ESPN GamePlan =

ESPN Gameplan
- Country: United States

Programming
- Language: English

Ownership
- Owner: ESPN Inc.

History
- Launched: September 5, 1992 (as The Option Play)
- Closed: August 28, 2015
- Replaced by: ESPN College Extra

ESPN GamePlan was an out-of-market sports package offering college football games to viewers throughout the United States. GamePlan began on Labor Day weekend, and continued through the first Saturday in December. It included all regional telecasts on ABC, as well as games from various syndicators like ESPN Plus, Raycom Sports and SportsWest, and some local stations like Allentown, Pennsylvania's WFMZ-TV which broadcast locally produced college football games. Viewers could watch games from their cable or satellite provider or on the ESPN3 broadband Internet service.

Eventually, with carriage of ESPN3 moving from computers only to smartphones, tablets and digital media players allowing access without any additional fees, GamePlan became a superfluous package, with only the few providers who refused to offer ESPN3 or where ESPN3 access was limited (for instance, rural areas) really able to compel viewers to use the service.

On August 28, 2015, the package was discontinued, along with ESPN Full Court, to make way for ESPN College Extra, which offered a select bundle of games that would previously have been broadcast by GamePlan and Full Court.

== History ==
In 1992, Showtime Event Television supplemented ABC's airing of regional college football telecasts by creating "Option Play." This allowed viewers to watch games not airing on their local ABC station via pay-per-view. The original cost for a single game was $8.95 (with each additional game costing $1 extra), with the full "season-ticket" package priced between $49.95 and $69.95. The following year, ESPN took over for Showtime and offered the purchase of up to three individual Saturday afternoon blocks for $8.95, as opposed to only a single game. In 1993, the package was renamed "Season Ticket", followed in 1994 by "ABC College Football on ESPN Pay-Per-View." In 1996, the name was again changed to "ESPN GamePlan", as the formation of ESPN Regional Television allowed for additional out-of-market games from conferences such as the Big Ten and MAC to be broadcast. ESPN would also pick up telecasts from other conferences such as the ACC, Big 12, Big East, Conference-USA, Mountain West, Pac-10, SEC and WAC for inclusion in GamePlan.

== Schedule ==
Up to 15 games were provided each week. Some games were joined in progress due to time and channel constraints. In 2007, ESPN GamePlan picked up additional telecasts of the Atlantic Coast Conference and Southeastern Conference shown on Comcast Sports Southeast/Charter Sports Southeast. This change replaced Big Ten Conference games that left ESPN Plus for the new Big Ten Network.

== See also ==
- NFL Sunday Ticket
- MLB Extra Innings
- NBA League Pass
- NHL Center Ice
- ESPN Full Court
- MLS Direct Kick
