= 2024 NBA Cup =

Basketball tournament

- Official poster for the championship game

Tournament information
- Location: Local NBA cities (group stage and quarterfinals); Las Vegas Strip (semifinals and championship game)
- Date: November 12 – December 17, 2024
- Venues: Local NBA arenas (group stage and quarterfinals); T-Mobile Arena (semifinals and championship game)
- Teams: 30
- Purse: See prize money

Final positions
- Champions: Milwaukee Bucks (1st title)
- Runner-up: Oklahoma City Thunder
- MVP: Giannis Antetokounmpo (Milwaukee Bucks)

The 2024 NBA Cup was a multi-stage basketball tournament played during the 2024–25 NBA season. It was the second edition of the NBA Cup. All 30 teams participated, each playing four regular season games that counted towards the tournament's group stage standings—all in the knockout round, except for the championship game. The Milwaukee Bucks defeated the Oklahoma City Thunder in the championship game. Milwaukee's Giannis Antetokounmpo was named the Most Valuable Player of the tournament.

The Los Angeles Lakers entered as the defending champions, but were eliminated in the group stage. The Indiana Pacers were also eliminated in the group stage after losses to the Miami Heat, Milwaukee Bucks, and Detroit Pistons, meaning that the championship game consisted of two new teams: the Bucks and the Oklahoma City Thunder.

== Format ==
The tournament's format was similar to in-season, multi-stage tournaments in European soccer.

In the group stage, each conference was divided into three groups with five teams each, for a total of six groups. Regular season games played on Tuesdays and Fridays between November 12 and December 3 counted in the regular season standings and the NBA Cup standings. Each team played one game against each of the other teams in its group, for a total of four games (two at home and two on the road).

If two or more teams in a group had equal records upon completion of group play, the following tiebreakers were applied in this order:

1. Head-to-head record in the group stage
2. Point differential in the group stage (excluding overtime)
3. Total points scored in the group stage (excluding overtime)
4. Regular season record from the 2023–24 regular season
5. Random drawing

Note: Overtime scoring did not count towards the point differential and total points tiebreakers in the Emirates NBA Cup. A team's point differential was "0" in Group Play games that went to overtime, and a team's total points scored excluded points scored in overtime.

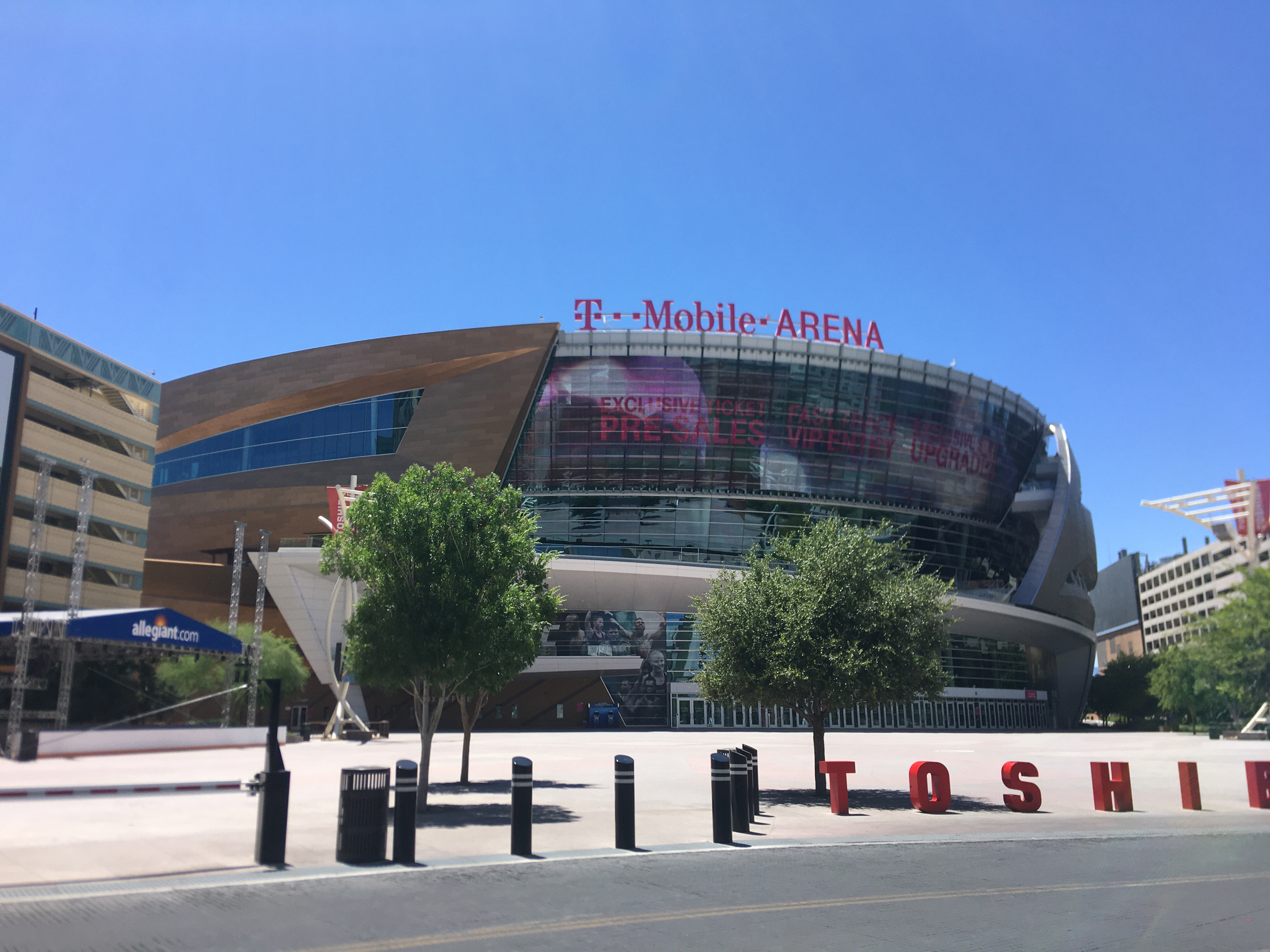
T-Mobile Arena in 2020

Each group's winner then advanced to the knockout stage, as did one wild card from each conference—the group runner-up with the best group stage record. The knockout stage was a single-elimination tournament. Quarterfinal games were played in local NBA markets on December 10 and 11, with the teams with the top two group stage records in each conference hosting, and the best team in group-play games would host the wild-card team. The semifinals were played on December 14, and the championship on December 17. The final two rounds were played at T-Mobile Arena on the Las Vegas Strip.

Quarterfinal and semifinal games counted as regular season games, affecting teams' positions in league standings, but the championship game did not. Statistics from the championship game were also not counted in regular season totals.

To balance the regular season, the teams that did not make the knockout stage played two additional consolation games on December 12 or 13 and 15 or 16, against each other in the same conference, while teams that were eliminated in the quarterfinals played one additional consolation game against each other (from the same conference) on December 15 or 16.

While the knockout stage was played, the 22 teams that did not qualify for the knockout stage each played two additional regular season games, one home and one away, to complete each team's 82 game regular season schedule. Among these 22 total matchups, 20 are intra-conference games, with an attempt by the league to schedule as many pairs of teams that were originally scheduled to only play each other three times during the regular season. The other two matchups are interconference games, as there is an odd number of teams in each conference (11). These two interconference matchups featured four of the six teams that finished last in their respective group.

=== Prize money ===
Players on teams advancing to the knockout stage received prize money as follows:

- Players on teams that lose in the quarterfinals: $51,497 each
- Players on teams that lose in the semifinals: $102,994 each
- Players on the tournament runner-up team: $205,988 each
- Players on the tournament championship team: $514,971 each

== Draw ==
=== Pots ===
Teams were allocated into five pots per conference based on the 2023–24 regular season standings. Pot 1 contained the teams with the top three regular season records in each conference, while Pot 2 contained the teams with the fourth- to sixth-best records and so forth, concluding with Pot 5, which contained the teams with the bottom three (thirteenth through fifteenth) records.

Eastern Conference in the 2024 NBA Cup
Pot	#	Team	Record	
Pot	#	Team	W	L
1	1	Boston Celtics	64	18
1	2	New York Knicks	50	32
1	3	Milwaukee Bucks	49	33
2	4	Cleveland Cavaliers	48	34
2	5	Orlando Magic	47	35
2	6	Indiana Pacers	47	35
3	7	Philadelphia 76ers	47	35
3	8	Miami Heat	46	36
3	9	Chicago Bulls	39	43
4	10	Atlanta Hawks	36	46
4	11	Brooklyn Nets	32	50
4	12	Toronto Raptors	25	57
5	13	Charlotte Hornets	21	61
5	14	Washington Wizards	15	67
5	15	Detroit Pistons	14	68

Western Conference in the 2024 NBA Cup
Pot	#	Team	Record	
Pot	#	Team	W	L
1	1	Oklahoma City Thunder	57	25
1	2	Denver Nuggets	57	25
1	3	Minnesota Timberwolves	56	26
2	4	Los Angeles Clippers	51	31
2	5	Dallas Mavericks	50	32
2	6	Phoenix Suns	49	33
3	7	New Orleans Pelicans	49	33
3	8	Los Angeles Lakers	47	35
3	9	Sacramento Kings	46	36
4	10	Golden State Warriors	46	36
4	11	Houston Rockets	41	41
4	12	Utah Jazz	31	51
5	13	Memphis Grizzlies	27	55
5	14	San Antonio Spurs	22	60
5	15	Portland Trail Blazers	21	61

=== Draw results ===
The initial groups were revealed during the tournament announcement on July 12, 2024.

Eastern Conference
Group A	Group B	Group C
New York Knicks (2); Orlando Magic (5); Philadelphia 76ers (7); Brooklyn Nets (11); Charlotte Hornets (13)	Milwaukee Bucks (3); Indiana Pacers (6); Miami Heat (8); Toronto Raptors (12); Detroit Pistons (15)	Boston Celtics (1); Cleveland Cavaliers (4); Chicago Bulls (9); Atlanta Hawks (10); Washington Wizards (14)

Western Conference
Group A	Group B	Group C
Minnesota Timberwolves (3); Los Angeles Clippers (4); Sacramento Kings (9); Houston Rockets (11); Portland Trail Blazers (15)	Oklahoma City Thunder (1); Phoenix Suns (6); Los Angeles Lakers (8); Utah Jazz (12); San Antonio Spurs (14)	Denver Nuggets (2); Dallas Mavericks (5); New Orleans Pelicans (7); Golden State Warriors (10); Memphis Grizzlies (13)

== Group stage ==
=== East group A ===
Pos	Team	Pld	W	L	PF	PA	PD	Qualification
1	New York Knicks	4	4	0	455	425	+30	Advance to knockout stage
2	Orlando Magic	4	3	1	441	396	+45	Advance to knockout stage
3	Philadelphia 76ers	4	2	2	408	411	−3	
4	Brooklyn Nets	4	1	3	436	475	−39	
5	Charlotte Hornets	4	0	4	406	439	−33	

Source: NBA
Rules for classification: Tiebreakers

Games

Note: Times are Eastern Time (UTC−4 or UTC−5) as listed by the NBA. If the venue is located in a different time zone, the local time is also given.

NBA League Pass

November 12
7:00 p.m.

Recap

Charlotte Hornets 89, Orlando Magic 114
Scoring by quarter: 29–31, 18–27, 19–31, 23–25
Pts: LaMelo Ball 35; Rebs: Moussa Diabaté 15; Asts: Ball, Miller 7 each	Pts: Franz Wagner 32; Rebs: Franz Wagner 8 Asts: Franz Wagner 5

Kia Center, Orlando, FL
Attendance: 17,541
Referees: Tom Washington, Ed Malloy, CJ Washington

TNT

November 12
7:30 p.m.

Recap

New York Knicks 111, Philadelphia 76ers 99
Scoring by quarter: 27–25, 27–25, 24–25, 33–24
Pts: OG Anunoby 24; Rebs: Karl-Anthony Towns 13; Asts: Josh Hart 10	Pts: Paul George 29; Rebs: Paul George 10; Asts: Joel Embiid 5

Wells Fargo Center, Philadelphia, PA
Attendance: 19,758
Referees: Pat Fraher, Kevin Scott, Dedric Taylor

NBA League Pass

November 15
7:00 p.m.

Recap

Philadelphia 76ers 86, Orlando Magic 98
Scoring by quarter: 21–24, 24–19, 27–30, 14–25
Pts: Jared McCain 29; Rebs: Joel Embiid 8 Asts: Paul George 5	Pts: Franz Wagner 31; Rebs: Franz Wagner 11; Asts: Franz Wagner 6

Kia Center, Orlando, FL
Attendance: 17,843
Referees: JB DeRosa, Nick Buchert, Phenizee Ransom

NBA League Pass

November 15
7:30 p.m.

Recap

Brooklyn Nets 122, New York Knicks 124
Scoring by quarter: 32–37, 27–31, 23–32, 40–24
Pts: Cam Thomas 43; Rebs: Ziaire Williams 8 Asts: Dennis Schröder 8	Pts: Jalen Brunson 37; Rebs: Josh Hart 9 Asts: Josh Hart 9

Madison Square Garden, New York, NY
Attendance: 19,812
Referees: Courtney Kirkland, Gediminas Petraitis, John Conley

NBA League Pass

November 19
7:30 p.m.

Recap

Charlotte Hornets 115, Brooklyn Nets 116
Scoring by quarter: 37–23, 22–31, 28–31, 28–31
Pts: Brandon Miller 29; Rebs: Tidjane Salaün 8 Asts: Tre Mann 6	Pts: Cameron Johnson 34; Rebs: Ben Simmons 9 Asts: Dennis Schröder 12

Barclays Center, Brooklyn, NY
Attendance: 18,117
Referees: James Williams, Jason Goldenberg, Pat O'Connell

NBA League Pass

November 22
7:00 p.m.

Recap

Brooklyn Nets 98, Philadelphia 76ers 113
Scoring by quarter: 24–29, 26–24, 27–26, 21–34
Pts: Cameron Johnson 37; Rebs: Nic Claxton 8 Asts: Schröder, Thomas 7 each	Pts: Jared McCain 30; Rebs: Guerschon Yabusele 11; Asts: Tyrese Maxey 5

Wells Fargo Center, Philadelphia, PA
Attendance: 19,817
Referees: James Capers, Kevin Cutler, Jonathan Sterling

NBA TV

November 29
12:00 p.m.

Recap

New York Knicks 99, Charlotte Hornets 98
Scoring by quarter: 15–23, 31–26, 25–23, 28–26
Pts: Jalen Brunson 31; Rebs: Hart, Towns 12 each Asts: Jalen Brunson 6	Pts: Brandon Miller 20; Rebs: Moussa Diabaté 11; Asts: Vasilije Micić 8

Spectrum Center, Charlotte, NC
Attendance: 19,313
Referees: Pat Fraher, Andy Nagy, Jenna Schroeder

NBA League Pass

November 29
7:30 p.m.

Recap

Orlando Magic 123, Brooklyn Nets 100
Scoring by quarter: 33–29, 28–20, 35–22, 27–29
Pts: Franz Wagner 29; Rebs: Franz Wagner 8 Asts: Franz Wagner 8	Pts: Shake Milton 22; Rebs: Claxton, Simmons 7 each Asts: Ben Simmons 8

Barclays Center, Brooklyn, NY
Attendance: 18,143
Referees: James Capers, Sean Wright, Brett Nansel

NBA League Pass

December 3
7:00 p.m.

Recap

Philadelphia 76ers 110, Charlotte Hornets 104
Scoring by quarter: 32–20, 23–24, 25–25, 30–35
Pts: Paul George 29; Rebs: Guerschon Yabusele 12; Asts: Paul George 8	Pts: Brandon Miller 34; Rebs: Nick Richards 14; Asts: KJ Simpson 9

Spectrum Center, Charlotte, NC
Attendance: 14,956
Referees: James Capers, Matt Boland, CJ Washington

TNT

December 3
7:30 p.m.

Recap

Orlando Magic 106, New York Knicks 121
Scoring by quarter: 27–36, 24–35, 24–35, 31–15
Pts: Franz Wagner 30; Rebs: Moritz Wagner 12; Asts: Franz Wagner 6	Pts: Karl-Anthony Towns 23; Rebs: Karl-Anthony Towns 15; Asts: Josh Hart 10

Madison Square Garden, New York, NY
Attendance: 19,812
Referees: Ed Malloy, J.T. Orr, Mousa Dagher

=== East group B ===
Pos	Team	Pld	W	L	PF	PA	PD	Qualification
1	Milwaukee Bucks	4	4	0	462	412	+50	Advance to knockout stage
2	Detroit Pistons	4	3	1	447	440	+7	
3	Miami Heat	4	2	2	459	439	+20	
4	Toronto Raptors	4	1	3	413	430	−17	
5	Indiana Pacers	4	0	4	445	505	−60	

Source: NBA
Rules for classification: Tiebreakers

Games

Note: Times are Eastern Time (UTC−4 or UTC−5) as listed by the NBA. If the venue is located in a different time zone, the local time is also given.

NBA League Pass

November 12
7:00 p.m.

Recap

Miami Heat 121, Detroit Pistons 123 (OT)
Scoring by quarter: 21–32, 30–25, 31–34, 29–20, Overtime: 10–12
Pts: Tyler Herro 40; Rebs: Bam Adebayo 12; Asts: Tyler Herro 8	Pts: Cunningham, Beasley 21 each Rebs: Jalen Duren 11; Asts: Cade Cunningham 9

Little Caesars Arena, Detroit, MI
Attendance: 17,806
Referees: Eric Dalen, Tyler Ford, Robert Hussey

NBA League Pass, Sportsnet

November 12
8:00 p.m. (7:00 p.m. Central)

Recap

Toronto Raptors 85, Milwaukee Bucks 99
Scoring by quarter: 21–26, 22–28, 24–27, 18–18
Pts: Gradey Dick 32; Rebs: Bruno Fernando 13; Asts: Davion Mitchell 8	Pts: Giannis Antetokounmpo 23; Rebs: Bobby Portis 8 Asts: Giannis Antetokounmpo 7

Fiserv Forum, Milwaukee, WI
Attendance: 17,341
Referees: Rodney Mott, James Williams, Mousa Dagher

NBA League Pass

November 15
7:00 p.m.

Recap

Miami Heat 124, Indiana Pacers 111
Scoring by quarter: 26–29, 35–26, 37–30, 26–26
Pts: Bam Adebayo 30; Rebs: Bam Adebayo 11; Asts: Bam Adebayo 7	Pts: Obi Toppin 21; Rebs: Jarace Walker 7 Asts: Tyrese Haliburton 8

Gainbridge Fieldhouse, Indianapolis, IN
Attendance: 17,274
Referees: Brent Barnaky, James Williams, Brandon Adair

NBA League Pass, Sportsnet

November 15
7:00 p.m.

Recap

Detroit Pistons 99, Toronto Raptors 95
Scoring by quarter: 32–27, 23–25, 18–26, 26–17
Pts: Malik Beasley 20; Rebs: Tobias Harris 11; Asts: Cade Cunningham 10	Pts: Jakob Pöltl 25; Rebs: Jakob Pöltl 18; Asts: RJ Barrett 7

Scotiabank Arena, Toronto, ON
Attendance: 19,245
Referees: Scott Foster, Tyler Ricks, Jacyn Goble

NBA League Pass

November 22
8:00 p.m. (7:00 p.m. Central)

Recap

Indiana Pacers 117, Milwaukee Bucks 129
Scoring by quarter: 22–34, 22–24, 35–35, 38–36
Pts: Pascal Siakam 25; Rebs: Bennedict Mathurin 9 Asts: Tyrese Haliburton 9	Pts: Giannis Antetokounmpo 37; Rebs: Giannis Antetokounmpo 10; Asts: Damian Lillard 13

Fiserv Forum, Milwaukee, WI
Attendance: 17,341
Referees: Josh Tiven, Suyash Mehta, Jacyn Goble

TNT

November 26
7:30 p.m.

Recap

Milwaukee Bucks 106, Miami Heat 103
Scoring by quarter: 31–20, 34–31, 20–29, 21–23
Pts: Damian Lillard 37; Rebs: Andre Jackson Jr. 9 Asts: Damian Lillard 12	Pts: Jimmy Butler 23; Rebs: three players 5 each Asts: four players 5 each

Kaseya Center, Miami, FL
Attendance: 19,622
Referees: James Capers, Tom Washington, Jason Goldenberg

NBA League Pass

November 29
8:00 p.m.

Recap

Detroit Pistons 130, Indiana Pacers 106
Scoring by quarter: 33–24, 30–29, 29–20, 38–33
Pts: Malik Beasley 25; Rebs: Jalen Duren 12; Asts: Cade Cunningham 11	Pts: Pascal Siakam 21; Rebs: Myles Turner 10; Asts: Tyrese Haliburton 5

Gainbridge Fieldhouse, Indianapolis, IN
Attendance: 17,274
Referees: Courtney Kirkland, Jacyn Goble, Evan Scott

NBA League Pass, TSN

November 29
8:00 p.m.

Recap

Toronto Raptors 111, Miami Heat 121
Scoring by quarter: 21–20, 40–38, 23–38, 27–25
Pts: RJ Barrett 25; Rebs: Barnes, Pöltl 10 each Asts: Scottie Barnes 10	Pts: Jimmy Butler 26; Rebs: Bam Adebayo 10; Asts: Bam Adebayo 10

Kaseya Center, Miami, FL
Attendance: 19,607
Referees: Marat Kogut, Tre Maddox, Brandon Schwab

NBA League Pass

December 3
7:00 p.m.

Recap

Milwaukee Bucks 128, Detroit Pistons 107
Scoring by quarter: 36–31, 42–28, 32–29, 18–19
Pts: Giannis Antetokounmpo 28; Rebs: Giannis Antetokounmpo 7 Asts: Giannis Antetokounmpo 8	Pts: Cade Cunningham 23; Rebs: Duren, Stewart 6 each Asts: Cade Cunningham 6

Little Caesars Arena, Detroit, MI
Attendance: 17,988
Referees: Kevin Cutler, Kevin Scott, Danielle Scott

NBA League Pass, TSN

December 3
7:30 p.m.

Recap

Indiana Pacers 111, Toronto Raptors 122
Scoring by quarter: 23–31, 25–34, 36–28, 27–29
Pts: Tyrese Haliburton 30; Rebs: Obi Toppin 9 Asts: Tyrese Haliburton 6	Pts: Scottie Barnes 35; Rebs: Jakob Pöltl 10; Asts: Scottie Barnes 9

Scotiabank Arena, Toronto, ON
Attendance: 17,741
Referees: Michael Smith, Pat Fraher, Ray Acosta

=== East group C ===
Pos	Team	Pld	W	L	PF	PA	PD	Qualification
1	Atlanta Hawks	4	3	1	485	470	+15	Advance to knockout stage
2	Boston Celtics	4	3	1	482	459	+23	
3	Cleveland Cavaliers	4	2	2	480	450	+30	
4	Chicago Bulls	4	2	2	518	512	+6	
5	Washington Wizards	4	0	4	408	482	−74	

Source: NBA
Rules for classification: Tiebreakers

Games

Note: Times are Eastern Time (UTC−4 or UTC−5) as listed by the NBA. If the venue is located in a different time zone, the local time is also given.

NBA League Pass

November 12
7:00 p.m.

Recap

Atlanta Hawks 117, Boston Celtics 116
Scoring by quarter: 29–31, 25–34, 30–26, 33–25
Pts: Dyson Daniels 28; Rebs: Jalen Johnson 13; Asts: Jalen Johnson 10	Pts: Jaylen Brown 37; Rebs: Tatum, White 6 each Asts: Jayson Tatum 8

TD Garden, Boston, MA
Attendance: 19,156
Referees: Derrick Collins, Courtney Kirkland, Ray Acosta

NBA League Pass

November 15
7:30 p.m.

Recap

Washington Wizards 117, Atlanta Hawks 129
Scoring by quarter: 39–29, 11–30, 25–35, 42–35
Pts: Kyle Kuzma 24; Rebs: Coulibaly, Kuzma 9 each Asts: Bub Carrington 9	Pts: Dyson Daniels 25; Rebs: Capela, Johnson, Okongwu 13 each Asts: Trae Young 9

State Farm Arena, Atlanta, GA
Attendance: 16,038
Referees: John Goble, CJ Washington, JD Ralls

NBA League Pass

November 15
7:30 p.m.

Recap

Chicago Bulls 126, Cleveland Cavaliers 144
Scoring by quarter: 34–49, 39–28, 29–30, 24–37
Pts: Coby White 29; Rebs: Nikola Vučević 8 Asts: LaVine, Williams 9 each	Pts: Donovan Mitchell 37; Rebs: Jarrett Allen 10; Asts: Darius Garland 9

Rocket Mortgage Fieldhouse, Cleveland, OH
Attendance: 19,432
Referees: Zach Zarba, Marat Kogut, Evan Scott

TNT

November 19
7:00 p.m.

Recap

Cleveland Cavaliers 117, Boston Celtics 120
Scoring by quarter: 20–26, 28–39, 40–28, 29–27
Pts: Donovan Mitchell 35; Rebs: Allen, Mobley 11 each Asts: Darius Garland 7	Pts: Jayson Tatum 33; Rebs: Jayson Tatum 12; Asts: Jayson Tatum 7

TD Garden, Boston, MA
Attendance: 19,156
Referees: Tony Brothers, Gediminas Petraitis, Danielle Scott

NBA League Pass

November 22
7:00 p.m.

Recap

Boston Celtics 108, Washington Wizards 96
Scoring by quarter: 29–27, 20–24, 26–21, 33–24
Pts: Jaylen Brown 31; Rebs: Jaylen Brown 11; Asts: Jayson Tatum 8	Pts: Jordan Poole 23; Rebs: Brogdon, Valančiūnas 10 each Asts: Jordan Poole 8

Capital One Arena, Washington, DC
Attendance: 20,385
Referees: Ed Malloy, Marat Kogut, Tyler Ricks

NBA League Pass

November 22
8:00 p.m. (7:00 p.m. Central)

Recap

Atlanta Hawks 122, Chicago Bulls 136
Scoring by quarter: 25–28, 26–30, 33–41, 38–37
Pts: Johnson, Young 25 each Rebs: Jalen Johnson 13; Asts: Trae Young 13	Pts: Zach LaVine 26; Rebs: Nikola Vučević 13; Asts: Coby White 9

United Center, Chicago, IL
Attendance: 19,979
Referees: Bill Kennedy, J.T. Orr, Robert Hussey

NBA League Pass

November 26
7:00 p.m.

Recap

Chicago Bulls 127, Washington Wizards 108
Scoring by quarter: 21–29, 40–18, 35–34, 31–27
Pts: Coby White 21; Rebs: Nikola Vučević 12; Asts: Josh Giddey 8	Pts: Kyle Kuzma 23; Rebs: Kuzma, Sarr 7 each Asts: Bilal Coulibaly 5

Capital One Arena, Washington, DC
Attendance: 15,921
Referees: Tony Brothers, Matt Boland, Karl Lane

NBA TV

November 29
2:30 p.m.

Recap

Cleveland Cavaliers 101, Atlanta Hawks 117
Scoring by quarter: 27–29, 23–23, 23–39, 28–26
Pts: Darius Garland 29; Rebs: Evan Mobley 12; Asts: Donovan Mitchell 6	Pts: De'Andre Hunter 23; Rebs: Clint Capela 13; Asts: Trae Young 11

State Farm Arena, Atlanta, GA
Attendance: 17,881
Referees: Michael Smith, Ben Taylor, Gediminas Petraitis

NBA League Pass

November 29
8:00 p.m. (7:00 p.m. Central)

Recap

Boston Celtics 138, Chicago Bulls 129
Scoring by quarter: 39–30, 28–37, 29–29, 42–33
Pts: Jayson Tatum 35; Rebs: Jayson Tatum 14; Asts: Jayson Tatum 5	Pts: Nikola Vučević 32; Rebs: Nikola Vučević 11; Asts: Josh Giddey 9

United Center, Chicago, IL
Attendance: 19,798
Referees: Kevin Scott, Mitchell Ervin, Brandon Adair

NBA League Pass

December 3
7:00 p.m.

Recap

Washington Wizards 87, Cleveland Cavaliers 118
Scoring by quarter: 20–35, 22–25, 25–26, 20–32
Pts: three players 13 each Rebs: Jonas Valančiūnas 11; Asts: Coulibaly, Poole 4 each	Pts: Mitchell, Mobley 19 each Rebs: Evan Mobley 10; Asts: Donovan Mitchell 7

Rocket Mortgage Fieldhouse, Cleveland, OH
Attendance: 19,432
Referees: Sean Wright, Eric Dalen, JD Ralls

=== West group A ===
Pos	Team	Pld	W	L	PF	PA	PD	Qualification
1	Houston Rockets	4	3	1	454	414	+40	Advance to knockout stage
2	Los Angeles Clippers	4	2	2	427	411	+16	
3	Minnesota Timberwolves	4	2	2	418	431	−13	
4	Portland Trail Blazers	4	2	2	430	457	−27	
5	Sacramento Kings	4	1	3	429	445	−16	

Source: NBA
Rules for classification: Tiebreakers

Games

Note: Times are Eastern Time (UTC−4 or UTC−5) as listed by the NBA. If the venue is located in a different time zone, the local time is also given.

NBA League Pass

November 12
10:00 p.m. (7:00 p.m. Pacific)

Recap

Minnesota Timberwolves 108, Portland Trail Blazers 122
Scoring by quarter: 17–28, 36–32, 21–33, 34–29
Pts: Naz Reid 28; Rebs: Rudy Gobert 8 Asts: Mike Conley 6	Pts: Jerami Grant 21; Rebs: Robert Williams III 9 Asts: Jerami Grant 8

Moda Center, Portland, OR
Attendance: 16,880
Referees: Tony Brothers, Derek Richardson, John Butler

NBA League Pass

November 15
8:00 p.m. (7:00 p.m. Central)

Recap

Los Angeles Clippers 104, Houston Rockets 125
Scoring by quarter: 21–29, 25–37, 29–28, 29–31
Pts: James Harden 21; Rebs: Ivica Zubac 11; Asts: Coffey, Porter Jr. 3 each	Pts: Jabari Smith Jr. 28; Rebs: Jabari Smith Jr. 11; Asts: VanVleet, Şengün 10 each

Toyota Center, Houston, TX
Attendance: 18,055
Referees: James Capers, Michael Smith, Natalie Sago

NBA League Pass

November 15
10:00 p.m. (7:00 p.m. Pacific)

Recap

Minnesota Timberwolves 130, Sacramento Kings 126 (OT)
Scoring by quarter: 32–27, 30–27, 36–28, 17–33, Overtime: 15–11
Pts: Anthony Edwards 36; Rebs: Rudy Gobert 11; Asts: Mike Conley Jr. 7	Pts: De'Aaron Fox 60; Rebs: Domantas Sabonis 12; Asts: De'Aaron Fox 7

Golden 1 Center, Sacramento, CA
Attendance: 16,478
Referees: Josh Tiven, Jason Goldenberg, Intae Hwang

NBA League Pass

November 22
8:00 p.m. (7:00 p.m. Central)

Recap

Portland Trail Blazers 88, Houston Rockets 116
Scoring by quarter: 20–31, 25–34, 28–31, 15–20
Pts: Avdija, Sharpe 13 each Rebs: Donovan Clingan 7 Asts: Jerami Grant 5	Pts: Dillon Brooks 28; Rebs: Amen Thompson 11; Asts: Fred VanVleet 8

Toyota Center, Houston, TX
Attendance: 15,546
Referees: Matt Myers, Mitchell Ervin, Aaron Smith

NBA League Pass

November 22
10:30 p.m. (7:30 p.m. Pacific)

Recap

Sacramento Kings 88, Los Angeles Clippers 104
Scoring by quarter: 12–26, 17–25, 35–25, 24–28
Pts: De'Aaron Fox 29; Rebs: Domantas Sabonis 15; Asts: De'Aaron Fox 7	Pts: James Harden 22; Rebs: Ivica Zubac 15; Asts: James Harden 9

Intuit Dome, Inglewood, CA
Attendance: 16,228
Referees: Sean Corbin, Karl Lane, Phenizee Ransom

NBA League Pass

November 26
8:00 p.m. (7:00 p.m. Central)

Recap

Houston Rockets 117, Minnesota Timberwolves 111 (OT)
Scoring by quarter: 32–26, 25–21, 27–31, 18–24, Overtime: 15–9
Pts: Fred VanVleet 27; Rebs: Alperen Şengün 10; Asts: Şengün, VanVleet 11 each	Pts: Anthony Edwards 29; Rebs: Rudy Gobert 16; Asts: Rob Dillingham 7

Target Center, Minneapolis, MN
Attendance: 18,978
Referees: Marat Kogut, Josh Tiven, Robert Hussey

ESPN

November 29
7:30 p.m. (6:30 p.m. Central)

Recap

Los Angeles Clippers 92, Minnesota Timberwolves 93
Scoring by quarter: 25–26, 22–27, 21–19, 24–21
Pts: James Harden 20; Rebs: Ivica Zubac 13; Asts: James Harden 11	Pts: Anthony Edwards 21; Rebs: Rudy Gobert 12; Asts: DiVincenzo, McDaniels 5 each

Target Center, Minneapolis, MN
Attendance: 18,978
Referees: Tom Washington, Ed Malloy, J.T. Orr

NBA League Pass

November 29
10:00 p.m. (7:00 p.m. Pacific)

Recap

Sacramento Kings 106, Portland Trail Blazers 115
Scoring by quarter: 30-25, 20-29, 22-33, 34-28
Pts: Malik Monk 29; Rebs: Domantas Sabonis 14; Asts: Domantas Sabonis 11	Pts: Deandre Ayton 26; Rebs: Avdija, Ayton 9 each Asts: Anfernee Simons 9

Moda Center, Portland OR
Attendance: 17,565
Referees: James Williams, Justin Van Duyne, Natalie Sago

NBA League Pass

December 3
10:00 p.m. (7:00 p.m. Pacific)

Recap

Houston Rockets 111, Sacramento Kings 120
Scoring by quarter: 28–21, 27–33, 29–42, 27–24
Pts: Jalen Green 28; Rebs: Tari Eason 12; Asts: Alperen Şengün 6	Pts: Domantas Sabonis 27; Rebs: Murray, Sabonis 7 each Asts: Malik Monk 12

Golden 1 Center, Sacramento, CA
Attendance: 15,019
Referees: John Goble, Marat Kogut, Jonathan Sterling

NBA League Pass

December 3
10:30 p.m. (7:30 p.m. Pacific)

Recap

Portland Trail Blazers 105, Los Angeles Clippers 127
Scoring by quarter: 31–36, 27–27, 20–28, 27-36
Pts: Deandre Ayton 16; Rebs: Jabari Walker 5 Asts: Anfernee Simons 6	Pts: Norman Powell 30; Rebs: Ivica Zubac 10; Asts: James Harden 7

Intuit Dome, Inglewood, CA
Attendance: 15,583
Referees: Tony Brothers, Jason Goldenberg, Sha'Rae Mitchell

=== West group B ===
Pos	Team	Pld	W	L	PF	PA	PD	Qualification
1	Oklahoma City Thunder	4	3	1	437	392	+45	Advance to knockout stage
2	Phoenix Suns	4	3	1	434	404	+30	
3	Los Angeles Lakers	4	2	2	437	461	−24	
4	San Antonio Spurs	4	2	2	446	443	+3	
5	Utah Jazz	4	0	4	451	505	−54	

Source: NBA
Rules for classification: Tiebreakers

Games

Note: Times are Eastern Time (UTC−4 or UTC−5) as listed by the NBA. If the venue is located in a different time zone, the local time is also given.

NBA League Pass

November 12
9:00 p.m. (7:00 p.m. Mountain)

Recap

Phoenix Suns 120, Utah Jazz 112
Scoring by quarter: 33–21, 31–28, 23–30, 33–33
Pts: Devin Booker 31; Rebs: Mason Plumlee 14; Asts: Tyus Jones 7	Pts: John Collins 29; Rebs: John Collins 10; Asts: Jordan Clarkson 8

Delta Center, Salt Lake City, UT
Attendance: 18,175
Referees: Kevin Cutler, Josh Tiven, John Conley

ESPN

November 15
7:30 p.m. (6:30 p.m. Central)

Recap

Los Angeles Lakers 120, San Antonio Spurs 115
Scoring by quarter: 31–30, 37–30, 25–26, 27–29
Pts: Anthony Davis 40; Rebs: LeBron James 16; Asts: LeBron James 12	Pts: Victor Wembanyama 28; Rebs: Victor Wembanyama 14; Asts: Chris Paul 11

Frost Bank Center, San Antonio, TX
Attendance: 18,916
Referees: Mark Lindsay, Tyler Ford, Matt Kallio

NBA League Pass

November 15
8:00 p.m. (7:00 p.m. Central)

Recap

Phoenix Suns 83, Oklahoma City Thunder 99
Scoring by quarter: 14–29, 22–19, 24–35, 23–16
Pts: Josh Okogie 15; Rebs: Josh Okogie 9 Asts: Devin Booker 4	Pts: Shai Gilgeous-Alexander 28; Rebs: Luguentz Dort 9 Asts: Shai Gilgeous-Alexander 4

Paycom Center, Oklahoma City, OK
Attendance: 18,203
Referees: Matt Myers, Mitchell Ervin, Dedric Taylor

TNT

November 19
9:30 p.m. (8:30 p.m. Central)

Recap

Oklahoma City Thunder 104, San Antonio Spurs 110
Scoring by quarter: 35–32, 22–28, 20–33, 27–17
Pts: Shai Gilgeous-Alexander 32; Rebs: Luguentz Dort 12; Asts: Gilgeous-Alexander, Wallace 7 each	Pts: Keldon Johnson 22; Rebs: Barnes, Bassey 8 each Asts: Chris Paul 11

Frost Bank Center, San Antonio, TX
Attendance: 16,667
Referees: John Goble, Ray Acosta, Sha'Rae Mitchell

NBA League Pass

November 19
10:30 p.m. (7:30 p.m. Pacific)

Recap

Utah Jazz 118, Los Angeles Lakers 124
Scoring by quarter: 22–34, 22–23, 31–40, 43–27
Pts: Lauri Markkanen 25; Rebs: three players 8 each Asts: Filipowski, George 6 each	Pts: Dalton Knecht 37; Rebs: Anthony Davis 14; Asts: LeBron James 12

Crypto.com Arena, Los Angeles, CA
Attendance: 18,997
Referees: Pat Fraher, Brent Barnaky, Brett Nansel

NBA League Pass

November 26
9:00 p.m. (7:00 p.m. Mountain)

Recap

San Antonio Spurs 128, Utah Jazz 115
Scoring by quarter: 32–35, 34–31, 30–27, 32–22
Pts: Victor Wembanyama 34; Rebs: Harrison Barnes 8 Asts: Tre Jones 7	Pts: Keyonte George 26; Rebs: John Collins 13; Asts: Keyonte George 7

Delta Center, Salt Lake City, UT
Attendance: 18,175
Referees: Derek Richardson, Mark Lindsay, Scott Twardoski

TNT

November 26
10:00 p.m. (8:00 p.m. Mountain)

Recap

Los Angeles Lakers 100, Phoenix Suns 127
Scoring by quarter: 25–31, 35–31, 18–36, 22–29
Pts: Anthony Davis 25; Rebs: Anthony Davis 15; Asts: LeBron James 10	Pts: Devin Booker 26; Rebs: Jusuf Nurkić 12; Asts: Devin Booker 10

Footprint Center, Phoenix, AZ
Attendance: 17,071
Referees: J.T. Orr, James Williams, Gediminas Petraitis

ESPN

November 29
10:00 p.m. (7:00 p.m. Pacific)

Recap

Oklahoma City Thunder 101, Los Angeles Lakers 93
Scoring by quarter: 32–24, 19–24, 20–21, 30–24
Pts: Shai Gilgeous-Alexander 36; Rebs: Isaiah Hartenstein 18; Asts: Shai Gilgeous-Alexander 9	Pts: Dalton Knecht 20; Rebs: Anthony Davis 12; Asts: Anthony Davis 7

Crypto.com Arena, Los Angeles, CA
Attendance: 18,997
Referees: John Goble, Eric Dalen, John Butler

NBA League Pass

December 3
8:00 p.m. (7:00 p.m. Central)

Recap

Utah Jazz 106, Oklahoma City Thunder 133
Scoring by quarter: 25–32, 25–30, 25–40, 31–31
Pts: Kessler, Sexton 17 each Rebs: Walker Kessler 11; Asts: Keyonte George 5	Pts: Jalen Williams 28; Rebs: Shai Gilgeous-Alexander 6 Asts: Shai Gilgeous-Alexander 7

Paycom Center, Oklahoma City, OK
Attendance: 17,711
Referees: JB DeRosa, Derrick Collins, Mitchell Ervin

NBA League Pass

December 3
9:00 p.m. (7:00 p.m. Mountain)

Recap

San Antonio Spurs 93, Phoenix Suns 104
Scoring by quarter: 19–29, 20–23, 32–23, 22–29
Pts: Devin Vassell 25; Rebs: Victor Wembanyama 13; Asts: Chris Paul 8	Pts: Devin Booker 29; Rebs: Beal, Booker 9 each Asts: Devin Booker 5

Footprint Center, Phoenix, AZ
Attendance: 17,071
Referees: Courtney Kirkland, Nick Buchert, Brandon Schwab

=== West group C ===
Pos	Team	Pld	W	L	PF	PA	PD	Qualification
1	Golden State Warriors	4	3	1	470	462	+8	Advance to knockout stage
2	Dallas Mavericks	4	3	1	493	447	+46	Advance to knockout stage
3	Denver Nuggets	4	2	2	455	449	+6	
4	Memphis Grizzlies	4	1	3	464	475	−11	
5	New Orleans Pelicans	4	1	3	409	458	−49	

Source: NBA
Rules for classification: Tiebreakers

Games

Note: Times are Eastern Time (UTC−4 or UTC−5) as listed by the NBA. If the venue is located in a different time zone, the local time is also given.

TNT

November 12
10:00 p.m. (7:00 p.m. Pacific)

Recap

Dallas Mavericks 117, Golden State Warriors 120
Scoring by quarter: 27–33, 36–26, 26–37, 28–24
Pts: Luka Dončić 31; Rebs: Dončić, Lively II 8 Asts: Dončić, Irving 6	Pts: Stephen Curry 37; Rebs: Kevon Looney 11; Asts: Stephen Curry 9

Chase Center, San Francisco, CA
Attendance: 18,064
Referees: Scott Foster, Scott Twardoski, Jonathan Sterling

NBA League Pass

November 15
8:00 p.m. (7:00 p.m. Central)

Recap

Denver Nuggets 94, New Orleans Pelicans 101
Scoring by quarter: 22–32, 32–27, 18–19, 22–23
Pts: Michael Porter Jr. 24; Rebs: Dario Šarić 8 Asts: Jamal Murray 8	Pts: Brandon Ingram 29; Rebs: Yves Missi 12; Asts: Brandon Ingram 7

Smoothie King Center, New Orleans, LA
Attendance: 16,137
Referees: Karl Lane, Ben Taylor, Jenna Schroeder

ESPN

November 15
10:00 p.m. (7:00 p.m. Pacific)

Recap

Memphis Grizzlies 118, Golden State Warriors 123
Scoring by quarter: 28–29, 20–26, 30–38, 40–30
Pts: Jaren Jackson Jr. 32; Rebs: Zach Edey 10; Asts: Marcus Smart 6	Pts: Buddy Hield 18; Rebs: Green, Curry 8 each Asts: Draymond Green 7

Chase Center, San Francisco, CA
Attendance: 18,064
Referees: Bill Kennedy, Brian Forte, Andy Nagy

NBA League Pass

November 19
8:00 p.m. (7:00 p.m. Central)

Recap

Denver Nuggets 122, Memphis Grizzlies 110
Scoring by quarter: 31–24, 37–33, 24–21, 30–32
Pts: Jamal Murray 27; Rebs: Michael Porter Jr. 11; Asts: Russell Westbrook 14	Pts: Santi Aldama 28; Rebs: Santi Aldama 11; Asts: Scotty Pippen Jr. 6

FedExForum, Memphis, TN
Attendance: 15,377
Referees: Courtney Kirkland, Tre Maddox, CJ Washington

NBA League Pass

November 19
8:30 p.m. (7:30 p.m. Central)

Recap

New Orleans Pelicans 91, Dallas Mavericks 132
Scoring by quarter: 29–44, 22–19, 18–34, 22–35
Pts: Trey Murphy III 19; Rebs: Yves Missi 9 Asts: three players 4 each	Pts: Luka Dončić 26; Rebs: Quentin Grimes 8 Asts: Kyrie Irving 7

American Airlines Center, Dallas, TX
Attendance: 20,077
Referees: JB DeRosa, Eric Dalen, Jacyn Goble

ESPN

November 22
7:30 p.m. (6:30 p.m. Central)

Recap

Golden State Warriors 112, New Orleans Pelicans 108
Scoring by quarter: 34–30, 28–33, 25–21, 25–24
Pts: Andrew Wiggins 30; Rebs: Green, Jackson-Davis 8 each Asts: Stephen Curry 7	Pts: Trey Murphy III 24; Rebs: Jeremiah Robinson-Earl 12; Asts: Boston Jr., Ingram 7 each

Smoothie King Center, New Orleans, LA
Attendance: 16,820
Referees: Sean Wright, Kevin Scott, Simone Jelks

ESPN

November 22
10:00 p.m. (8:00 p.m. Mountain)

Recap

Dallas Mavericks 123, Denver Nuggets 120
Scoring by quarter: 33–31, 40–22, 22–36, 28–31
Pts: Naji Marshall 26; Rebs: P. J. Washington 13; Asts: Kyrie Irving 6	Pts: Nikola Jokić 33; Rebs: Nikola Jokić 17; Asts: Jamal Murray 11

Ball Arena, Denver, CO
Attendance: 19,923
Referees: Marc Davis, Brent Barnaky, Scott Twardoski

NBA TV

November 29
5:00 p.m. (4:00 p.m. Central)

Recap

New Orleans Pelicans 109, Memphis Grizzlies 120
Scoring by quarter: 28–32, 28–35, 26–25, 27–28
Pts: CJ McCollum 30; Rebs: Yves Missi 14; Asts: Dejounte Murray 6	Pts: Ja Morant 27; Rebs: Brandon Clarke 11; Asts: Ja Morant 7

FedExForum, Memphis, TN
Attendance: 17,014
Referees: Zach Zarba, Karl Lane, Jonathan Sterling

NBA League Pass

December 3
8:30 p.m. (7:30 p.m. Central)

Recap

Memphis Grizzlies 116, Dallas Mavericks 121
Scoring by quarter: 26–25, 31–35, 38–22, 21–39
Pts: Ja Morant 31; Rebs: Santi Aldama 8 Asts: Marcus Smart 6	Pts: Luka Dončić 37; Rebs: Luka Dončić 12; Asts: P. J. Washington 7

American Airlines Center, Dallas, TX
Attendance: 20,277
Referees: Sean Corbin, Ben Taylor, Jenna Schroeder

TNT

December 3
10:00 p.m. (8:00 p.m. Mountain)

Recap

Golden State Warriors 115, Denver Nuggets 119
Scoring by quarter: 31–33, 26–24, 28-33, 30–29
Pts: Stephen Curry 24; Rebs: Kevon Looney 11; Asts: Stephen Curry 11	Pts: Nikola Jokić 38; Rebs: Nikola Jokić 10; Asts: Jamal Murray 7

Ball Arena, Denver, CO
Attendance: 19,912
Referees: Matt Myers, Justin Van Duyne, Tyler Ford

== Ranking of second-placed teams ==
=== Eastern Conference ===
Pos	Team	Pld	W	L	PF	PA	PD	Qualification
1	Orlando Magic	4	3	1	441	396	+45	Advance to knockout stage
2	Boston Celtics	4	3	1	482	459	+23	
3	Detroit Pistons	4	3	1	447	440	+7	

Source: NBA
Rules for classification: Tiebreakers

=== Western Conference ===
Pos	Team	Pld	W	L	PF	PA	PD	Qualification
1	Dallas Mavericks	4	3	1	493	447	+46	Advance to knockout stage
2	Phoenix Suns	4	3	1	434	404	+30	
3	Los Angeles Clippers	4	2	2	427	411	+16	

Source: NBA

== Knockout stage ==
=== Qualified teams ===
Eastern Conference

Pos	Team	Pld	W	L	PF	PA	PD
1	Milwaukee Bucks	4	4	0	462	412	+50
2	New York Knicks	4	4	0	455	425	+30
3	Atlanta Hawks	4	3	1	485	470	+15
4	Orlando Magic	4	3	1	441	396	+45

Source: NBA
Rules for classification: Tiebreakers

Western Conference

Pos	Team	Pld	W	L	PF	PA	PD
1	Oklahoma City Thunder	4	3	1	437	392	+45
2	Houston Rockets	4	3	1	454	414	+40
3	Golden State Warriors	4	3	1	470	462	+8
4	Dallas Mavericks	4	3	1	493	447	+46

Source: NBA
Rules for classification: Tiebreakers

=== Bracket ===
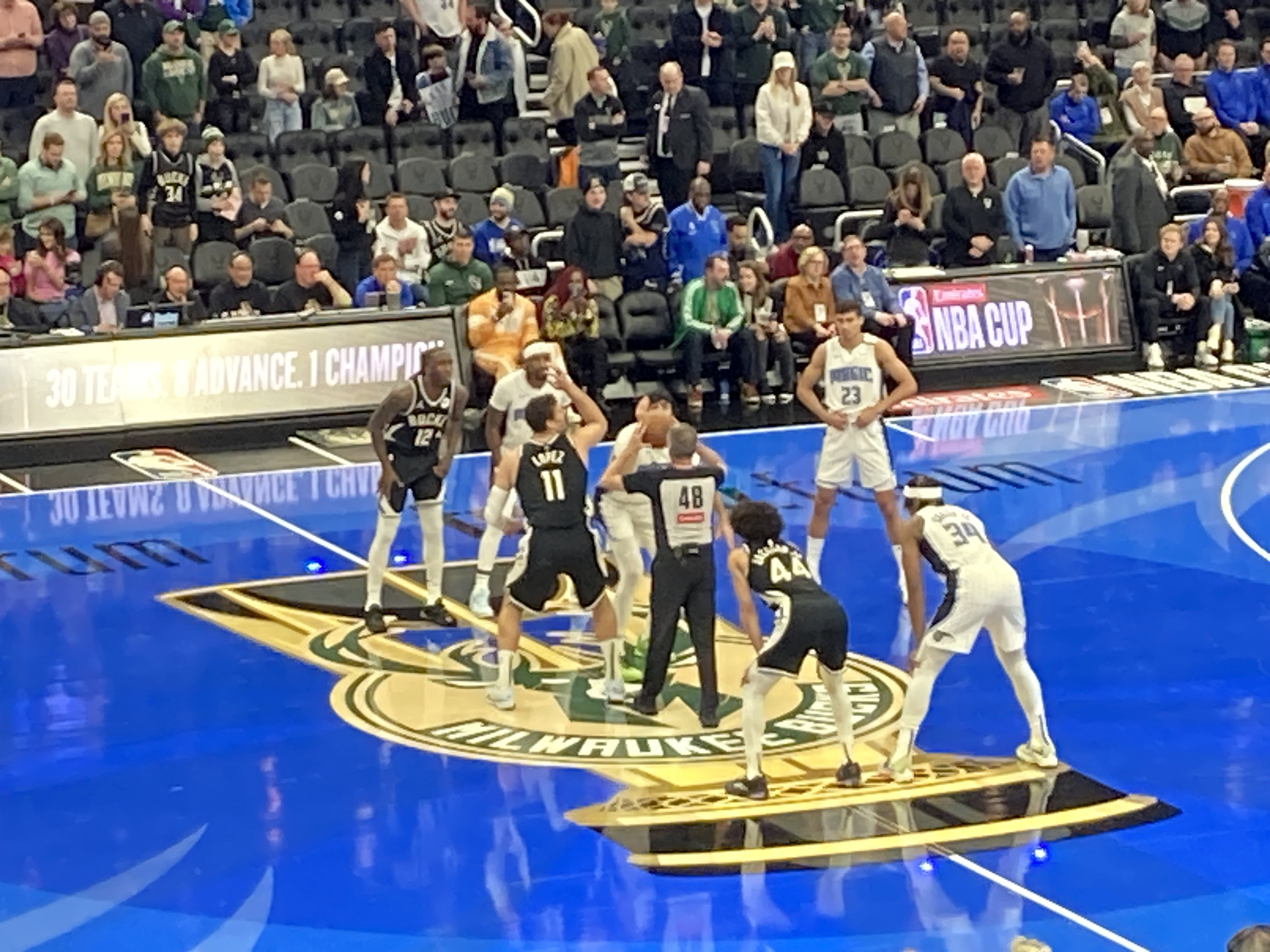
Opening tip of the Magic vs. Bucks quarterfinal game

Home team listed first (quarterfinals only).

Quarterfinals
December 10 – Milwaukee, WI
1 Milwaukee	114
4 Orlando	109
December 11 – New York, NY
2 New York	100
3 Atlanta	108
December 10 – Oklahoma City, OK
1 Oklahoma City	118
4 Dallas	104
December 11 – Houston, TX
2 Houston	91
3 Golden State	90

Semifinals
December 14 – Las Vegas, NV
1 Milwaukee	110
3 Atlanta	102
December 14 – Las Vegas, NV
1 Oklahoma City	111
2 Houston	96

Championship game
December 17 – Las Vegas, NV
E1 Milwaukee	97
W1 Oklahoma City	81

=== Quarterfinals ===
Note: Times are Eastern Standard Time (UTC−5) as listed by the NBA. If the venue is located in a different time zone, the local time is also given.

TNT

December 10
7:00 p.m. (6:00 p.m. Central)

Recap

Orlando Magic 109, Milwaukee Bucks 114
Scoring by quarter: 33–25, 26–35, 13–20, 37–34
Pts: Jalen Suggs 32; Rebs: Goga Bitadze 14; Asts: Wendell Carter Jr. 5	Pts: Giannis Antetokounmpo 37; Rebs: Bobby Portis 10; Asts: Damian Lillard 9

Fiserv Forum, Milwaukee, WI
Attendance: 17,341
Referees: Scott Foster, Sean Corbin, CJ Washington

TNT

December 10
9:30 p.m. (8:30 p.m. Central)

Recap

Dallas Mavericks 104, Oklahoma City Thunder 118
Scoring by quarter: 24–32, 30–25, 19–33, 31–28
Pts: Thompson, Marshall 19 each Rebs: Dereck Lively II 13; Asts: three players 5 each	Pts: Shai Gilgeous-Alexander 39; Rebs: Isaiah Hartenstein 13; Asts: Shai Gilgeous-Alexander 5

Paycom Center, Oklahoma City, OK
Attendance: 17,724
Referees: Brian Forte, Kevin Scott, Jenna Schroeder

ESPN

December 11
7:00 p.m.

Recap

Atlanta Hawks 108, New York Knicks 100
Scoring by quarter: 22–28, 25–26, 34–18, 27–28
Pts: De'Andre Hunter 24; Rebs: Jalen Johnson 15; Asts: Trae Young 11	Pts: Josh Hart 21; Rebs: Karl-Anthony Towns 19; Asts: Jalen Brunson 8

Madison Square Garden, New York, NY
Attendance: 19,812
Referees: Ben Taylor, Jacyn Goble, Natalie Sago

TNT

December 11
9:30 p.m. (8:30 p.m. Central)

Recap

Golden State Warriors 90, Houston Rockets 91
Scoring by quarter: 18–20, 19–24, 32–24, 21–23
Pts: Jonathan Kuminga 20; Rebs: three players 7 each Asts: Stephen Curry 5	Pts: Alperen Şengün 26; Rebs: Alperen Şengün 11; Asts: Fred VanVleet 7

Toyota Center, Houston, TX
Attendance: 18,055
Referees: Bill Kennedy, Brent Barnaky, Mousa Dagher

=== Semifinals ===
TNT

December 14
4:30 p.m. (1:30 p.m. Pacific)

Recap

Atlanta Hawks 102, Milwaukee Bucks 110
Scoring by quarter: 28–26, 21–29, 34–27, 19–28
Pts: Trae Young 35; Rebs: Jalen Johnson 10; Asts: Trae Young 10	Pts: Giannis Antetokounmpo 32; Rebs: Giannis Antetokounmpo 14; Asts: Giannis Antetokounmpo 9

T-Mobile Arena, Las Vegas, NV
Attendance: 17,113
Referees: John Goble, Tre Maddox, John Butler

ABC

December 14
8:30 p.m. (5:30 p.m. Pacific)

Recap

Houston Rockets 96, Oklahoma City Thunder 111
Scoring by quarter: 20–18, 22–23, 27–34, 27–36
Pts: Amen Thompson 19; Rebs: Alperen Şengün 11; Asts: Fred VanVleet 7	Pts: Shai Gilgeous-Alexander 32; Rebs: Luguentz Dort 9 Asts: Shai Gilgeous-Alexander 6

T-Mobile Arena, Las Vegas, NV
Attendance: 17,937
Referees: James Capers, Nick Buchert, Ray Acosta

=== Championship game ===
ABC

December 17
8:30 p.m. (5:30 p.m. Pacific)

Recap

Milwaukee Bucks 97, Oklahoma City Thunder 81
Scoring by quarter: 27–28, 24–22, 26–14, 20–17
Pts: Giannis Antetokounmpo 26; Rebs: Giannis Antetokounmpo 19; Asts: Giannis Antetokounmpo 10	Pts: Shai Gilgeous-Alexander 21; Rebs: Isaiah Hartenstein 12; Asts: Jalen Williams 3

T-Mobile Arena, Las Vegas, NV
Attendance: 18,519
Referees: Josh Tiven, Karl Lane, Justin Van Duyne

The Bucks missed Khris Middleton due to illness. The Thunder struggled with shooting throughout the game, going 5-of-32 from long-range, setting season lows in both field goal and three-point percentage. The game was close at halftime, with the Bucks leading 51–50, but the Bucks pulled away in the third quarter, holding the Thunder to just 14 points in the period. The Bucks led by as many as 20 points, before closing out the game with a 16-point victory, 97 to 81. Giannis Antetokounmpo recorded a triple-double while leading the Bucks in points (26), rebounds (19), and assists (10).

Starters:			Pts	Reb	Ast
G	0	Damian Lillard	23	4	4
G	44	Andre Jackson Jr.	2	3	1
F	12	Taurean Prince	6	2	2
F	34	Giannis Antetokounmpo	26	19	10
C	11	Brook Lopez	13	9	1
Reserves:					
F	9	Bobby Portis	5	9	3
G	20	A. J. Green	9	1	2
G	24	Pat Connaughton	0	0	1
G	5	Gary Trent Jr.	13	3	1
F	3	MarJon Beauchamp	0	0	0
G	77	AJ Johnson	0	1	0
F	7	Chris Livingston	0	1	0
F	21	Tyler Smith	0	0	0
G	13	Ryan Rollins	DNP		
G	55	Delon Wright	DNP		
Head coach:
Doc Rivers

Milwaukee	Oklahoma City

Milwaukee	Statistics	Oklahoma City
34/81 (42.0%)	Field goals	29/87 (33.3%)
17/40 (42.5%)	3-point field goals	5/32 (15.6%)
12/18 (66.7%)	Free throws	18/22 (81.8%)
9	Offensive rebounds	7
43	Defensive rebounds	36
52	Total rebounds	43
25	Assists	13
19	Turnovers	10
6	Steals	10
4	Blocks	5
20	Fouls	14
28	Points in the paint	34
9	Fast break points	11
20	Biggest lead	7
27	Bench points	15
11	Points off turnovers	12

Starters:			Pts	Reb	Ast
G	2	Shai Gilgeous-Alexander	21	4	2
G	11	Isaiah Joe	7	3	1
F	5	Luguentz Dort	4	8	1
F	8	Jalen Williams	18	4	3
C	55	Isaiah Hartenstein	16	12	2
Reserves:					
G	22	Cason Wallace	5	1	1
G/F	34	Kenrich Williams	3	2	1
G	9	Alex Caruso	2	3	0
G/F	21	Aaron Wiggins	0	3	0
G	25	Ajay Mitchell	5	2	2
C	15	Branden Carlson	0	1	0
F	3	Dillon Jones	0	0	0
Head coach:
Mark Daigneault

== Awards and aftermath ==
The Bucks won their first NBA Cup title, and Giannis Antetokounmpo was unanimously given the Most Valuable Player (MVP) award for the tournament after the championship game on December 17. Antetokounmpo followed LeBron James as the second winner of the award. Taurean Prince, who won the 2023 title with the Los Angeles Lakers, became the first player to win multiple NBA Cups. Bucks assistant coach Darvin Ham won his second title as well, having won the title as head coach of the Lakers in the previous season. Each player on the Bucks roster received $514,971 in prize money, while Thunder players received $205,988 each. The Bucks raised a championship banner at Fiserv Forum on December 19.

On December 19, the NBA announced the All-Tournament Team:

All-NBA Cup Tournament Team
Pos.	Player	Team
G	Trae Young	Atlanta Hawks
G	Shai Gilgeous-Alexander	Oklahoma City Thunder
G	Damian Lillard	Milwaukee Bucks
F	Giannis Antetokounmpo (MVP)	Milwaukee Bucks
C	Alperen Şengün	Houston Rockets

== Sponsorship ==
This was the first year of a multiyear deal with the airline company Emirates to be the title sponsor of the NBA Cup.

== Media coverage ==
The group stage of the tournament was covered by the NBA's existing broadcasters. During the group stage, TNT aired a doubleheader on Tuesday nights, while ESPN aired a doubleheader on Friday nights. NBA TV aired three additional games during the afternoon on Black Friday.

During the knockout stage, one quarterfinal aired on ESPN, three quarterfinals and one semifinal aired on TNT, and one semifinal and the championship game aired in primetime on ABC and ESPN+.

As was the case last season, ESPN and TNT collaborated to cover the semifinals, but for pregame, postgame, and halftime only, with the "Inside the NBA" crew joining the "NBA Countdown" crew for certain segments, and Stephen A. Smith joining TNT for certain segments, including a friendly free-throw and 3-point shooting competition.

The championship game was broadcast for the second and final year of its deal on ABC (including local stations WISN-TV in Milwaukee and KOCO-TV in Oklahoma City), before moving to Prime Video in 2025. The game was the second-most viewed of the season thus far with 2.99 million viewers. The game was also streamed for the first time on ESPN+ as part of a modified rearrangement that saw the platform simulcasting more events from ABC since August 2024.
