= ESPN College Extra =

Sports television subscription package

ESPN College Extra was an American multinational out-of-market sports package owned by ESPN Inc. It was launched on September 5, 2015, as a merger of the existing ESPN Full Court and ESPN GamePlan, each of which offered college basketball and college football broadcasts respectively, and closed down on August 15, 2023.

ESPN College Extra broadcasts were drawn from the available live games from ESPN3. ESPN College Extra broadcast college sports from NCAA FBS and FCS conferences, including football, basketball, baseball, and softball, across eight channels.

== History ==
ESPN College Extra was announced by ESPN, Inc. on August 28, 2015, with launch date and its schedule. College Extra started broadcasting on September 5, 2015, at 12:30 p.m. with the Wofford vs. Clemson football game. At launch, the package was available on AT&T U-verse, Bright House Networks, Cox, DirecTV, Time Warner Cable, Verizon Fios, and select NCTC members. After its rights had transitioned to ESPN+ and the wireline channel was from the lineups of providers such as Verizon Fios, Spectrum, and Hulu in the preceding years, ESPN College Extra de facto shut down on June 30, 2023 (the final day of the 2022–23 NCAA academic year), and contractually ended on August 15, 2023.
