= Blackout (broadcasting) =

Non-airing of programming (typically sports-related) in a certain media market

In broadcasting, the term blackout refers to the non-airing of television or radio programming in a certain media market.

It is particularly prevalent in the broadcasting of sports events, although other television or radio programs may be blacked out as well. Most blackout policies serve to protect local broadcasters (primarily regional sports networks) from competition by "out-of-market" networks that carry different teams, by only allowing viewers to watch non-national telecasts of teams within their designated markets (with television providers blacking out regional telecasts of teams that are outside their market; in turn, encouraging viewers to purchase subscription-based out-of-market sports packages), and by allowing teams to black out national telecasts of games that are also being shown by a local broadcaster. In these situations, the national stations would close in those areas for the duration of the game, and in some cases be replaced with other stations until the game ends.

By contrast, some blackout policies, such as those of the U.S. National Football League and English association football (soccer), serve to encourage attendance to games by respectively requiring that a specific percentage of tickets be sold in order for a game to be televised in the home team's market, or by enforcing a blanket prohibition on any domestic telecasts of the sport during specific windows.

The term is also used in relation to situations where programming is removed or replaced on international feeds of a television service, because the broadcaster does not hold the territorial rights to air the programs outside of their home country. In some cases, replacement programming airs, but when there's no replacement programming required, the feed would temporarily close, and would not resume broadcasting until the next programme was due to begin.

== Canada ==
=== Federal elections ===
Perhaps the most notable non-sports-related blackout in television was the blackout of Canadian federal election coverage. Because there are six time zones across Canada, polls close in different parts of the country at different times. Section 329 of the Canada Elections Act outlawed disseminating election results from other ridings in constituencies where polls were still open, ostensibly to prevent the results from the East from influencing voters in western ridings.

However, in the federal election in 2000, Paul Charles Bryan published results from Atlantic Canada online despite being told not to by the authorities. Bryan was charged before the Provincial Court of British Columbia, but fought the charges as unconstitutional under section 2 of the Canadian Charter of Rights and Freedoms, which protects freedom of expression and freedom of association. Bryan's victory before the British Columbia Supreme Court meant that voters in British Columbia and the rest of Canada legally learned of election results in other ridings during the federal election in 2004. However, Elections Canada appealed, and Bryan lost his case before the British Columbia Court of Appeal. Bryan further appealed to the Supreme Court of Canada, but in a 5–4 ruling made on March 15, 2007 (R. v. Bryan), the Court ruled that Section 329 of the Canada Elections Act is constitutional and justified under section 1 of the Canadian Charter of Rights and Freedoms. Stephen Harper, who later became Prime Minister, labelled Elections Canada "jackasses" and tried to raise money for Bryan. The Canadian Broadcasting Corporation also supported Bryan, hoping to "make election night a bigger event than it already is".

Before the 2000 election, Elections Canada moved to reduce the effects of the blackout and the influence of unauthorized knowledge of election results in Western ridings by altering the times that polls close, so that polls no longer close at the same local time throughout the country. Polls in Atlantic Canada close at 9 p.m. Atlantic (9:30 in Newfoundland), polls from Alberta to Quebec close an hour later (9 p.m. Eastern, 8 p.m. Central and 7 p.m. Mountain) and finally, polls in British Columbia close an hour after that (7 p.m. Pacific). Historically, the results of the election are often not decisively known until more than an hour after polls close in the Eastern Time Zone, but are usually known within two hours of those polls closing.

Provincial elections are not subject to blackout restrictions—‌in provinces that have two time zones, the vast majority of the population lives in one time zone or the other. Election laws in these provinces stipulate that all polls are to close at the same time, this time invariably being 8:00 p.m. (or 9:00 p.m. in Ontario beginning with the 2007 provincial election) in the time zone of the majority.

On August 17, 2011, Elections Canada Chief Electoral Officer Marc Mayrand suggested improvements of the voting system to Parliament; among them were a proposal to remove the blackout rule. Mayrand argued that "the growing use of social media puts in question not only the practical enforceability of the rule, but also its very intelligibility and usefulness in a world where the distinction between private communication and public transmission is quickly eroding. The time has come for Parliament to consider revoking the current rule." On January 13, 2012, it was announced that the federal government would introduce legislation that would repeal the blackout rule, citing the increased use of social media. The blackout rule was officially repealed in October 2015, prior to the 2015 Canadian federal election.

=== CFL ===
The Canadian Football League's constitution does provide the option for teams to black out games in their home markets in order to encourage attendance; at one point, the CFL required games to be blacked out within a radius of 120 kilometres (75 miles) around the closest over-the-air signal carrying the game, or 56 kilometres (35 miles) of the stadium for cable broadcasts (and, for the Saskatchewan Roughriders, the entirety of the province).

The policy received significant criticism in 2002 when the Hamilton Tiger-Cats enforced a blackout on a game against the Toronto Argonauts that had playoff implications; the range of the blackout was considered too wide for the market.

Under the league's 2008–2013 contract with TSN, teams were given a cap on the number of blackouts they could impose per-season (with the number varying by media and CFL reports, ranging from 2 for Hamilton and Toronto, and 5 for teams in Western Canada), and final decisions were assigned to the league if at least 90% of tickets were sold out within 48 hours of the game. Although the CFL stated that the league's current contract with TSN (which began in 2014) does allow for blackouts, they have been seldom-used, if not at all.

=== NHL ===
Rogers Sportsnet broadcast regions

Map of TSN's regional feeds

As in the U.S., National Hockey League games that are not scheduled as national telecasts by Sportsnet or TVA Sports are broadcast by regional feeds of either Sportsnet, TSN, or RDS (French), and are blacked out for viewers outside the team's home market. Sportsnet's four regional feeds correspond with each of its NHL teams' designated markets; the Ontario and Pacific feeds are designated to the Toronto Maple Leafs, and Vancouver Canucks respectively, while Sportsnet West and its corresponding market (which includes all of Alberta and Saskatchewan) is shared by the Edmonton Oilers and Calgary Flames. Although West is also the main feed for Manitoba, Flames and Oilers games are blacked out there to protect the Winnipeg Jets. As of August 2014, TSN is similarly structured, with the Ottawa Senators on TSN5 (East), Maple Leafs on TSN4 (Ontario), and Jets on TSN3 (Manitoba and Saskatchewan). The Montreal Canadiens were added in 2017 on TSN2 (which was originally promoted as being a secondary national channel). The Canadiens and Senators share the same market, which includes parts of Eastern Ontario (primarily the Ottawa Valley), and the entirety of Quebec and Atlantic Canada, while Saskatchewan is shared by the Jets, Flames, and Oilers.

Until the 2014–15 season, all French-language broadcasts of the Montreal Canadiens were available nationally on RDS, which was previously the national French-language rightsholder of the NHL in Canada. As RDS was, until 2011, the only French-language cable sports channel in Canada, the team forwent a separate regional rights deal and allowed all of its games to be broadcast as part of the national package. As of the 2014–15 season, Quebecor Media and TVA Sports is the national French rightsholder as part of a sub-licensing agreement with Rogers Communications. RDS negotiated a 12-year deal with the team for regional rights to the Canadiens: games are now blacked out for viewers outside Quebec, Atlantic Canada, and parts of Eastern Ontario.

Out-of-market games can be viewed using the subscription-based NHL Centre Ice and Sportsnet+; in-market games are blacked out from Centre Ice to protect local broadcasters, but Sportsnet+ does not black out in-market broadcasts of games televised by Sportsnet since it is a direct-to-consumer version of the Sportsnet channels themselves.

=== Internet television ===
Many programs carried on Internet television in other parts of the world are not available in Canada because the major broadcast networks in Canada secure exclusive rights to them and prevent Internet television aggregators, one notable example being Hulu, from distributing them in Canada. The National Football League, for example, sold worldwide Internet broadcast rights to a package of its Thursday Night Football games during the 2016 season to Twitter; however, Rogers Media forced Twitter to block the streams in Canada by virtue of its holding of terrestrial television rights in the country. Numerous organizations have attempted to establish workarounds that route Canadians' Internet traffic through the United States, workarounds that local broadcasters have opposed, with one, Bell Media, calling such practices "stealing", and that aggregators such as Netflix have actively fought against.

== India ==
Indian law requires all sporting events of "national importance", whose broadcast rights are owned by a pay television service, to be simulcast by the state broadcaster Doordarshan (DD) on its DD National TV channel. Tata Sky (which is partially owned by the parent company of Star India, owner of the Star Sports networks) filed a lawsuit over the rule, arguing that these simulcasts devalued the exclusive broadcast rights because DD National is a must-carry channel. In 2017, the Supreme Court of India ruled that pay television services must black out DD National when it is airing such events in order to protect the pay TV broadcaster, restricting availability of DD's simulcasts of such events to terrestrial television and DD Free Dish.

== United Kingdom ==
=== Association football ===
UEFA Article 48.2 and the major association football leagues of the United Kingdom enforce a blackout on all television broadcasts of football between 2:45 p.m. and 5:15 p.m. on Saturday matchdays. This applies to all matches, regardless of whether they are a domestic or international competition. A match which kicks off within the window may be joined in progress once the blackout window ends.

This policy is ostensibly intended to encourage fans to attend football matches in-person, especially in lower divisions that compete with top-flight matches on television. The practice originated in the 1960s; Burnley chairman Bob Lord was opposed to television broadcasts of football matches — going as far as banning the BBC from televising Match of the Day from Turf Moor for a time. He pushed the Football League to adopt this stance as an organization-wide policy; it has since been adopted by The Football Association and the current Premier League, which broke away from the Football League in 1992 to become the highest level of club football in England.

Affected matches can still be broadcast internationally, hence more Premier League matches can be shown outside the United Kingdom by other rightsholders than within. This intricacy created a "grey market" for obtaining the broadcasts from alternative sources, such as foreign satellite providers or unofficial online streaming services. The Premier League and other stakeholders have historically considered this practice to be a violation of the copyright of the broadcasts. In 2014, for taking inadequate steps to prevent unauthorized retransmissions from its streaming broadcasts online, the Premier League briefly restricted MENA region rightsholder beIN Sports to one 3 p.m. match per week on television only.

Critics, including Advocate General at the Court of Justice of the European Union Juliane Kokott, have argued that 3 p.m. blackouts are outdated, as its purpose is hindered — especially within the Premier League — by the high demand for the few tickets available to the public, and that there was little evidence that television broadcasts actually affected attendance. To preserve the value of its domestic broadcast rights and allow more games to be televised, the Premier League has added more matches in windows outside of Saturday afternoons, such as weekdays and Sundays — including the final matchday of the season.

In 2018, after complying by blacking out the first 15 minutes of a Serie A match that saw Cristiano Ronaldo's on-field debut for Juventus, streaming service Eleven Sports UK & Ireland began to defy the ban and show selected Serie A and La Liga matches during this period. On October 17, 2018, Eleven announced that it would cease its telecasts of 3 p.m. kickoffs, but argued that the rule was outdated because only the UK and Montenegro have such blackout rules, and that the blackout period encourages illegal streaming. A representative of La Liga has backed Eleven Sports' position.

In April 2020, due to the COVID-19 pandemic, UEFA authorised the suspension of the blackout rule for the remainder of the season. Upon the resumption of the 2019–20 Premier League, all matches were shown on domestic television due to them being played behind closed doors, while a number of free-to-air broadcasts (via Sky Sports' sister channels Pick and Sky One, Amazon Prime Video and its sister service Twitch, and the BBC — which usually holds rights to free-to-air highlights programmes) were also aired. This arrangement continued into the first month of the 2020–21 Premier League. After an attempted pay-per-view scheme folded in November 2020, the Premier League returned to allocating the matches to the four broadcasters through at least the end of 2020.

In 2023, the Premier League sought a rare private prosecution against members of a fraud "gang" who sold £10-a-month subscriptions to retransmitted games. The illegal streams brought in more than £7m in revenue from more than 50,000 subscribers, with five members receiving jail sentences between three and eleven years.

== United States ==
=== MLB/NHL blackout policies ===
Major League Baseball and the National Hockey League have very similar blackout rules. Unlike the National Football League, the blackout of games has nothing to do with attendance, but instead is implemented to protect broadcasters with contracts to air games. Unless one of MLB's national partners hold exclusive rights to a certain regular season game (such as NBC's Sunday Night Baseball, Apple TV+’s Friday Night Baseball, FOX's Baseball Night in America on saturday nights, ESPN's 30 exclusive games at any time, or exclusive games on Netflix or Peacock), the local broadcaster of a game has priority over a national broadcaster, and the national broadcast would be blacked out in markets where a local broadcaster is also showing coverage. The blackout rules do not apply during the postseason, as there are no regional television broadcasts. Games on FS1 co-exist with Local broadcast, and games on TBS may have one co-exist with Local broadcast per team, per season.

The NHL utilizes a similar policy of exclusive and non-exclusive national games; with the new broadcast deals enacted with 2021–22 season, all regular season games carried by ABC, ESPN, and ESPN+ are exclusive national broadcasts. All TNT games were exclusive national broadcasts during the 2021–22 season, but became subject to blackouts the following season. In some cases, national games are scheduled in windows where no other games involving U.S. teams are being played. NHL Network still carries non-exclusive national games, most of which are simulcast from one of the regional broadcasts or a Canadian national broadcast. All games in the first round of the Stanley Cup playoffs are non-exclusive national games (though with no blackouts of the national broadcaster), after which they are exclusive to ESPN, TNT, or TBS.

Out-of-market games can be viewed using the subscription-based MLB Extra Innings, MLB.tv, and NHL Center Ice services, as well as ESPN+ for the NHL. In-market games are blacked out from all four services to protect local broadcasters, and (aside from ESPN+, which also carries a package of exclusive national broadcasts simulcast with Hulu) they do not offer nationally televised games.

==== Radio blackouts ====
In Major League Baseball, there are radio blackouts. However, for many years, the local radio networks of the two participating ballclubs in the World Series were not allowed to air games, forcing flagship stations, if they wanted to carry the Series, to simulcast the network broadcast. As an example, while Boston Red Sox radio flagship WHDH and St. Louis Cardinals flagship station KMOX both broadcast the 1967 World Series, both stations had to simulcast the NBC Radio broadcast along with Boston's WCOP and St. Louis's KSD, the nominal NBC Radio affiliates in those cities.

This changed after 1980, as fans of the Philadelphia Phillies were angry that they could not hear their popular broadcasting team of Harry Kalas and Richie Ashburn call the team's appearance in that year's World Series. Their complaints led to a provision in Major League Baseball's next broadcasting contract permitting the radio flagships of the participating ballclubs to produce and air their own Series broadcasts locally. Since then, only the flagship stations of the two participating ballclubs can originate coverage (though their broadcasts, as well as the national English and Spanish broadcasts, are also available out of market via subscription-based packages on such platforms as MLB.com, SiriusXM, and TuneIn). Flagship stations are required to make mention of the presenting sponsor of the national ESPN Radio broadcasts as also sponsoring the team's own broadcasts during the World Series (as of 2016 this is AutoZone). All other network affiliates of the two clubs must carry the feed from MLB's national partner (currently ESPN Radio). Should another ESPN Radio affiliate exist in the same market, that station can claim exclusivity, forcing a blackout of the team network affiliate from carrying the game, although this is rarely done as listener pushback against the ESPN Radio affiliate blocking the local play-by-play would likely be untenable (for instance in 2016, ESPN Radio O&O WMVP in Chicago broadcast the national ESPN feed as expected, but made no move to block the official Cubs broadcaster WSCR from carrying local play-by-play, to the point of only mentioning the national coverage existed on their station through promos in national ESPN Radio programming).

Additionally, radio stations (including flagships) may not include MLB games in the live Internet streams of their station programming. MLB itself offers radio feeds as a pay service via the league and team websites, along with being a part of the monthly premium fee service from streaming provider TuneIn. Some stations will simply stream the station's regularly scheduled programming that is being pre-empted by the game.

The NHL has no radio blackouts for local broadcasts, although NBC Sports Radio broadcasts are, similarly to some cable broadcasts, not carried within the local markets of participating teams. Internet streaming of radio calls from the NHL's team radio networks, unlike MLB, are allowed to be broadcast for free nationwide with no geoblocking. Also, unlike other leagues, the Stanley Cup Finals (should a team make it to that point in the playoffs) can also be carried on all affiliates of that team's radio network with no restrictions.

=== NBA blackout policy ===
Prior to the 1998–99 NBA lockout, the NBA and the WNBA used to black out nationally televised games on cable television within 35 miles (56 km) of the home team's market; however, these are now restricted to games on NBA TV, WatchESPN and other streaming providers.

=== NFL blackout policy ===
The NFL has engaged in various blackout policies to protect both local ticket sales, and local rightsholders of specific games.

==== Blackouts based on attendance ====
In the NFL, any broadcaster that has a signal that hits any area within a 75 miles (121 km) radius of an NFL stadium may only broadcast a game if that game is a road game (also known as an away game), or if the game sells out 72 hours or more before the start time for the game. If sold out in less than 72 hours, or is close to being sold out by the deadline, the team can sometimes request a time extension. Furthermore, broadcasters with NFL contracts are required to show their markets' road games, even if the secondary markets have substantial fanbases for other teams (like in Harrisburg, Pennsylvania, officially a Baltimore Ravens secondary market, but home to many Pittsburgh Steelers fans). Sometimes if a game is within a few hundred tickets of selling out, a broadcaster with rights to show the nearly sold-out game will buy the remaining tickets (and give them to local charities) so it can broadcast the game. Other teams elect to close off sections of their stadium, but cannot sell these tickets for any game that season if they choose to do so. As a result, if the home team's game is a Sunday day game, both networks can air only one game each in that market (until 2000, this rule applied whether or not the game was blacked out; however, this was changed because some markets virtually never aired doubleheaders as a result). Usually, but not always, when each network can show only one game each in a market, the two stations work out between themselves which will show an early game and which will show a late game. This only affects the primary market, and not markets in a 75-mile (121 km) radius, which always get a doubleheader each Sunday. For the NFL International Series, the network broadcasting an International Series game will not have the game blacked out for the team's markets as the game is played outside of the United States; however, some blackout regulations do apply.

There have been two exceptions to the rule, of which one has never been implemented and the other no longer applies. The first is for the Green Bay Packers, which have two overlapping 75-mile blackout zones – one surrounding the team's stadium in Green Bay and another surrounding Milwaukee. The team's radio flagship station is in Milwaukee, and the Packers played part of their home schedule in Milwaukee from 1953 through 1994. However, this policy has never been implemented in the Packers' case, as they have sold out every home game in Green Bay since 1960 and have a decades-long season-ticket waiting list (games in Milwaukee also sold out during this period). The second exception was for the Bills Toronto Series; by a technicality, Rogers Communications (the team's lessee) owned all tickets to those games and resold them to potential fans. Even when Rogers failed to sell all of the tickets, they were still technically defined to be sellouts by the league since Rogers was said to have "bought" the tickets. The technicality came into play for both Toronto Series preseason games, and again for the last two regular season games of the series. The Bills Toronto Series was cancelled after the 2013 season, largely due to the aforementioned lackluster attendance.

In June 2012, NFL blackout regulations were revised in which, for the first time in NFL history, home games would no longer require a total sellout to be televised locally; instead, teams would be allowed to set a benchmark anywhere from 85 to 100 percent of the stadium's non-premium seats. Any seats sold beyond that benchmark are subject to heavier revenue sharing with the league. Four teams, the Buffalo Bills, the Cleveland Browns, the Indianapolis Colts and the San Diego Chargers, opted out of the new rules, as it would require the teams to pay a higher percentage of gate fees to the NFL's revenue fund. In the 2013 NFL season, the Oakland Raiders began to artificially limit the capacity of Oakland Coliseum by 11,000 in order to improve their chances of meeting the 85% threshold; the seats comprised sections of "Mount Davis", an extended upper deck that had originally been built as part of the Raiders' 1995 return to Oakland. Under NFL rules, the stadium had to remain in this configuration for the entirety of the season.

In the 2015 NFL season, the league, after no games were blacked out at all in the 2014 season, voted to "suspend" the blackout policy as an experiment. The suspension continued into the 2016 season (a season that included the return of the Rams to the Los Angeles Memorial Coliseum as an interim home until the completion of SoFi Stadium; the Coliseum has had long-standing issues with NFL sell-outs); commissioner Roger Goodell stated that the league needed to further investigate the impact of removing the blackout rules before such a change is made permanent. The suspension quietly continued into the 2017 NFL season as well, which saw the San Diego Chargers also relocate to Los Angeles, temporarily using the 27,000-seat, soccer-specific Dignity Health Sports Park (known as StubHub Center before 2019) as an interim venue until the completion of SoFi Stadium for the 2020 season, which is shared with the Rams.

The suspension came a year after the Federal Communications Commission (FCC) ended a policy that formally forbade multichannel television providers from distributing telecasts of sporting events that had been blacked out by local broadcast television stations. Then-FCC chairman Tom Wheeler considered such policies to be "obsolete". The policies are still enforced via contractual agreements between the NFL and its media partners.

==== Exclusivity of local simulcasts for cable and streaming games ====
Per NFL policies, all games that are exclusively televised on pay television or streaming, including ESPN's Monday Night Football and Amazon Prime Video’s Thursday Night Football are syndicated to over-the-air broadcasters in the markets of the teams involved, and blacked out on the cable channel in defense of the local simulcast. The local market for these rights is defined as any station within the 75-mile (121 km) radius of a team's respective stadium. When this happens, the cable network affected closes in the region, with cable operators choosing to either leave the space blank for the duration of the game, or replacing it with a relay of another station.

This policy attracted controversy in December 2007, when Hartford, Connecticut CBS affiliate WFSB was refused permission to air the local simulcast of a New England Patriots-New York Giants game on December 29, 2007. The game, which was part of the Thursday Night Football package on NFL Network, would see the Patriots attempt to become the first NFL team since 1972 and the expansion of the regular season to 16 games, to finish the regular season undefeated. At the time, NFL Network was available only on a sports tier of cable provider Comcast in the immediate viewing areas of the Patriots and Giants. Senator John Kerry and Rep. Ed Markey, both of the state of Massachusetts and fans of the Patriots team, wrote to the NFL as well as Comcast and Time Warner Cable, to request that the Patriots-Giants game be aired at least on basic cable in order to reach the highest possible number of television-viewing fans, citing the "potentially historic" nature of the game. Kerry clarified the next week that he did not intend to interrupt current negotiations between the cable operators and NFL.

On December 19, 2007, Joe Courtney and other members of the Connecticut Congressional Delegation wrote to NFL commissioner Roger Goodell to try to have the NFL allow wider broadcast access to the game. Consequently, on December 26, the NFL announced that the game would be simulcast nationally on CBS and NBC, in addition to WCVB-TV (ABC) in Boston and WWOR-TV (MyNetworkTV) in Secaucus, New Jersey (which is part of the New York City media market)—which had both acquired the local rights to the game.

Although NFL Network would later become more established, in 2014 the NFL began to sub-license the right to produce the Thursday Night Football telecasts, and air selected games from the package in simulcast with NFL Network, to a broadcast television rightsholder (initially CBS). This was part of a move to help heighten the profile of the fledgling Thursday night games.

==== Radio broadcasts ====
For radio broadcasts, the NFL follows a nearly identical policy to MLB. There are no radio blackouts, but only each team's flagship station can carry local broadcasts during the conference championships or Super Bowl. All other markets must carry the NFL on Westwood One feed for those games. For all other weeks, within 75 miles of a team's stadium, only stations the team or its flagship station contracts with can carry those games, regardless if the team is home or away. Thus, any competing station that carries Westwood One broadcasts cannot air those games. Like MLB, the NFL makes local broadcasts (except for those of the Tennessee Titans) available on NFL's Game Pass service and Sirius Satellite Radio; as a result, radio stations that carry NFL games, from any source, and stream on the Internet are prohibited from streaming games online outside of their DMA, although it seems this provision is loosely enforced in some cases; WBBM in Chicago and WWL (AM) in New Orleans regularly air live broadcasts of their teams' games over their Internet stream, as does WTMJ in Milwaukee with the Packers, though both stations went to a desktop-only streaming policy in 2015 due to the introduction of GamePass and the absorption of the NFL Audio Pass streaming system into Game Pass. Since the 2022–23 season, WXTB (the Bucs' flagship station) blacks out coverage on all devices unless in the station's coverage area, likely due to the launch of NFL+.

==== Sports Broadcasting Act of 1961 ====
In order to protect high school and college football, the federal Sports Broadcasting Act of 1961 cancels antitrust protection for television broadcasts of any professional football game on Friday evenings after (after 6:00 p.m.) or Saturdays by television stations within 75 miles (121 km) of the venue of a college or high school game, that had been announced in a general circulation newspaper prior to August 1 of the calendar year. This lasts from the second Friday in September through the second Saturday in December.

To comply with this law, the NFL largely avoids scheduling games on Fridays at all and Saturdays altogether until the final weeks of the regular season (which begin in mid-December), which usually feature several Saturday double- or triple-headers. A notable effect of this law occurred in the 2004 NFL season, where a Tennessee Titans/Miami Dolphins game in week 1 was moved up to Saturday, September 11, due to Hurricane Ivan; presumably to comply with the Act, the game was only broadcast locally, and blacked out on NFL Sunday Ticket. As part of Thursday Night Football, the NFL has scheduled a "Black Friday" game on the day after Thanksgiving since 2023; the game has always been scheduled as an afternoon game with a 3 p.m. ET kickoff, usually ending near or just after 6 p.m, Since 2024, when Week 1 lands on the First Friday, an additional Friday night game is played at 8 p.m. ET that night (if it lands on the Second Friday, an additional week of Saturday games will be played at the end of the season).

=== Indianapolis 500 ===
To encourage local attendance, Indianapolis Motor Speedway (IMS) enforces a blackout on the live television broadcast of the Indianapolis 500 in the Indianapolis media market if the race is not a sellout. Since 1992, the station that airs the race in the Indianapolis market (ABC affiliate WRTV from 1986 to 2018, NBC affiliate WTHR from 2019 to 2024, and Fox affiliate WXIN from 2025 onward) airs the race on tape delay in prime time, and carries the network's prime time programming in the race's timeslot under special dispensation from the network. Prior to 1986, ABC had aired an edited broadcast of the race in prime time.

The blackout has only been lifted six times since live flag-to-flag coverage of the 500 officially began in 1986, due to sellouts in 2016, 2021, 2025, and 2026, a weather delay in 2024, and the 2020 edition being held with no spectators due to the COVID-19 pandemic).

Until 2001, the same blackout policy applied to the Brickyard 400, a NASCAR Cup Series event also held at IMS; at the time, television rights to NASCAR events were sold by the owners of their respective tracks, and IMS had packaged the 400 with ABC's rights to the Indianapolis 500. This policy ended in 2001 when NASCAR centralized the television rights to all events, and sold them in two packages to Fox Sports and NBC/TNT respectively.

=== Non-sports blackouts ===
There have been examples of U.S. network affiliates selectively blacking out episodes of entire series of television programs, typically due to censorship for political or religious reasons, ethics reasons, or other factors:

- During the 1950s and 1960s, NBC affiliate WLBT in Jackson, Mississippi frequently preempted programming that contained references to racial justice or featured African Americans as cast members, due to then-owner Lamar Life Insurance Company's staunch support of racial segregation. Segments of NBC News programs covering the civil rights movement were censored under the guise of technical difficulties, and Lamar also worked with white supremacist groups such as Citizens' Councils to give them a platform within the station's programming. In 1969, the Federal Communications Commission (FCC) stripped Lamar of its broadcast license for violations of the fairness doctrine; WLBT was transferred to an interim non-profit ownership group, which would heavily revamp the station's operations and programming to be racially-inclusive.
- A 1963 episode of the CBS television drama series East Side/West Side, focusing on an African-American couple in Harlem, was blacked out by network affiliates in Shreveport, Louisiana (KSLA) and Atlanta, Georgia (WAGA-TV).
- In 1997, ABC affiliate WBMA in Birmingham, Alabama declined to carry the Ellen episode "The Puppy Episode" (where title character Ellen Morgan, played by Ellen DeGeneres, came out as a lesbian) because station management did not consider it to be appropriate for family viewing.
- Salt Lake City's KSL-TV—an NBC affiliate owned by the LDS Church's commercial broadcasting arm Bonneville International, has a long history of having declined to air specific NBC (and, prior to its switch, CBS) programs that it believed were contradictions of Mormon values. In most cases, these programs are usually sublicensed to another station in the market instead (such as KUCW or KMYU), preventing them from being unavailable entirely.
- In 2004, Sinclair Broadcast Group ordered its ABC affiliates to not air an episode of Nightline where anchor Ted Koppel would read the names of United States casualties in the Iraq War, arguing that it appeared to be "motivated by a political agenda designed to undermine the efforts of the United States in Iraq".
- NBC's short-lived drama The Book of Daniel (2006) was declined by a number of affiliates—particularly in the "Bible Belt" of the Southern United States—due to pressure from the American Family Association over its content.
- In 2017, NBC owned-and-operated station WVIT in Connecticut blacked out an episode of Sunday Night with Megyn Kelly due to its inclusion of a segment featuring radio host and conspiracy theorist Alex Jones, due to sensitivity issues relating to Jones' denial of the Sandy Hook Elementary School shooting.
- In September 2025, both Sinclair and Nexstar Media Group announced that they would preempt ABC's late-night talk show Jimmy Kimmel Live!, following pressure from U.S. government officials over remarks by host Jimmy Kimmel regarding the reaction of president Donald Trump and his government to the assassination of Charlie Kirk. ABC subsequently suspended the program indefinitely until September 23, 2025, when the show returned to air; Sinclair and Nexstar stations continued to preempt the program until September 26.
