= MLS Direct Kick =

Cable and satellite package

MLS Direct Kick was an out-of-market sports package distributed by most cable and satellite providers in North America. As of the 2011 season, package subscribers were able to watch up to 221 Major League Soccer regular season games as well as some MLS Cup playoff matches. The target market for this package (based on advertisements) is soccer fans who are unable to see games because they have moved out of that team's market. It has been superseded by MLS Season Pass, which returned to DIRECTV in 2025.

== Availability ==
MLS Direct Kick was available with these cable and satellite providers:

- United States
  - DirecTV
  - In Demand
  - Charter Communications
  - Cox Communications
  - Frontier Communications
  - Avail-TVN

== Blackout restrictions ==
If a local MLS team is playing and the game is being seen locally, the associated feed on MLS Direct Kick is blacked out. Note also the games being televised on Fox/Fox Sports 1, ESPN/ESPN 2/ESPN Deportes, and/or Univision/Unimás/TUDN telecasts are not available in the package due to the rights of those games being purchased by the previous television stations prior to the beginning of the season. Virtually all of those channels were already included in the packages of the cable and satellite distributors.

Original logo

== History ==
The MLS Direct Kick Package was known as The MLS/ESPN Shootout Package in the early years of MLS. The name change occurred prior to the 2005 MLS season.

== See also ==
- NFL Sunday Ticket
- MLB Extra Innings
- NBA League Pass
- NHL Center Ice
- NASCAR Hot Pass
