= Major League Baseball blackout policy =

Rules governing blackouts of Major League Baseball telecasts

Major League Baseball (MLB) has rules for exclusive broadcasting, called "blackout" rules, which bar certain areas from watching certain live games. Most blackouts exist for two reasons: to set a given team's local broadcaster's exclusive broadcast territory, which induces cable systems in those areas to carry the regional sports networks that carry the games, as well as MLB's desire to drive stadium attendance.

== United States ==
U.S.A. MLB blackout map

Almost every part of the contiguous United States has at least one team blackout in place, with some having more. Every team has a home market blackout, while some teams have blackout areas that extend into several surrounding states. For example, the Kansas City Royals are blacked out in the states of Missouri (except in the St. Louis metro area), Kansas, Nebraska, Oklahoma, Arkansas, and Iowa.

The state with the most regional blackouts is Iowa, which is blacked out by six teams — the Brewers, Cardinals, Cubs, Royals, Twins, and White Sox — even though Milwaukee, St. Louis, Chicago, Kansas City, and Minneapolis all are a multi-hour drive away.

Local broadcasts are not necessarily available in the whole blackout territory. For example, Bally Sports Wisconsin is unavailable in Iowa, so Brewers games are not broadcast anywhere in the state, neither on local channels nor on streaming. Las Vegas is another example of fans having restricted viewership, as the Arizona Diamondbacks, Athletics, Los Angeles Angels, Los Angeles Dodgers, San Diego Padres, and San Francisco Giants are all blacked out.

Hawaii, despite being approximately 2,500 miles from the mainland United States, is blacked out for all five teams in California, and will remain blacked out for the four remaining once the Athletics move to Las Vegas. Alaska is blacked out from Seattle Mariners games.

Because they play in Canada, the Toronto Blue Jays do not have any blackout territory in the United States. However, some MLB teams have blackouts that extend into Canada.

=== ESPN ===
A new contract between ESPN and Major League Baseball in 2012 virtually eliminated local blackouts involving the network's Monday and Wednesday night games, allowing ESPN coverage to co-exist with that of the local broadcasters in home markets. The agreement took effect at the start of the 2014 season and lasted until 2021.

A contract extension between ESPN and MLB was struck in 2021, and was supposed to last until 2028 but ended in 2025 due to a clause allowing an opt out of the contract.

=== Apple TV ===
In March 2022, MLB and Apple signed a streaming deal worth $85 million annually. Through this streaming deal, Apple will broadcast a doubleheader every Friday, during the regular season on their streaming platform Apple TV+.

=== Bally Sports bankruptcy ===
Due to the parent company of the Bally Regional Sports network, Diamond Sports Group, applying for bankruptcy, there have been calls to end the blackout rule so that local fans can no longer rely on only cable providers to watch their teams' games.

== Canada ==
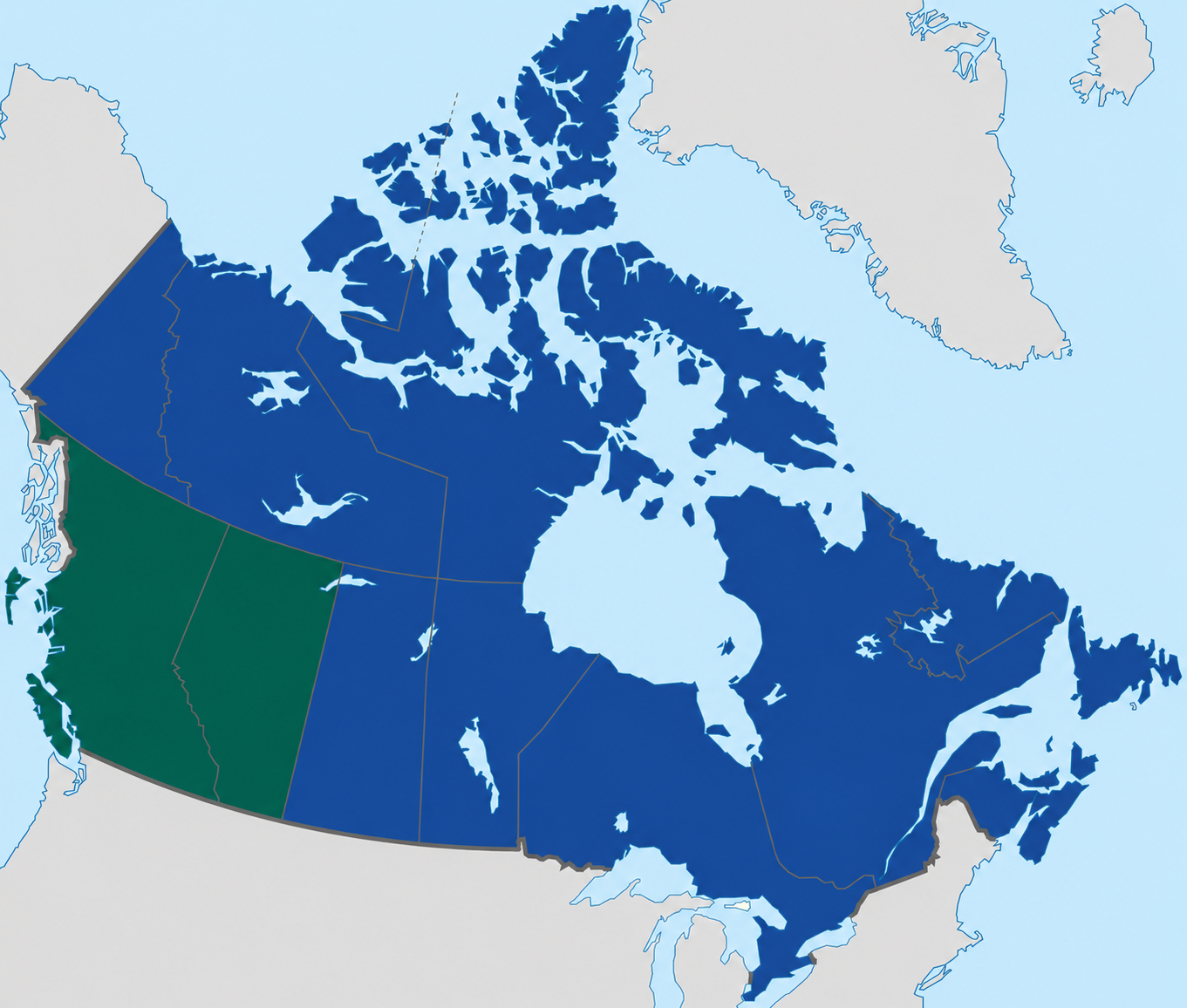
Blackout map of Canada: Toronto Blue Jays only Toronto Blue Jays and Seattle Mariners

The Toronto Blue Jays' blackout territory includes all of Canada. However, they must share British Columbia and Alberta with the Seattle Mariners. In the past, the province of Quebec was not included in Toronto's territory, as it belonged to the Montreal Expos exclusively, while the majority of Southern Ontario was assigned to the Toronto Blue Jays (Ottawa and London were open markets). Toronto and Montreal also shared all territory outside of Southern Ontario and Quebec. As of 2026, with the exception of games broadcast on Apple TV, all Toronto Blue Jays games are aired on Sportsnet in Canada. Historically, Blue Jays games broadcast nationally over-the-air on the Canadian Broadcasting Corporation television network had occasionally been subject to local blackout on CBET-TV in Windsor, Ontario, to protect the territorial rights of the Detroit Tigers across the Detroit River. No American RSNs are available on Canadian specialty television providers.

== Consumer devices ==
Consumer devices that enable television subscribers to transmit their home television feed outside their host area to a remote location over the Internet, a practice called placeshifting, have drawn the ire of MLB. MLB's position is that subscribers who wish to watch MLB telecasts while traveling either settle for the local telecasts available or subscribe to MLB's own broadcasts for an additional fee. Consumer advocates insist the practice is legal since the remote content is already purchased and is merely placeshifted by the subscriber; they claim MLB is asking fans to pay twice for the same content. MLB counters that travelers utilizing placeshifting technology are undercutting the blackout rights MLB grants to local and national broadcasters, as well as MLB's own internet service.

In 2009, MLB launched MLB Network on basic cable similar to the NFL Network. As part of the new network, MLB has told owners to reduce their blackouts due to outrage amongst fans and letters pouring into MLB's offices. In particular, MLB is looking to address the availability of regional sports networks outside teams' immediate home markets. Ostensibly, if teams/channels are not available in certain locations, teams could lose their claims to such areas and coverage would be replaced by the MLB-controlled Extra Innings service.

== Radio blackouts ==
In MLB, there are radio blackouts. ESPN Radio has exclusive rights to the World Series and only the flagship stations of the two participating ballclubs can originate coverage, though their broadcasts are also available on SiriusXM (as of April 2021, both on satellite radio and streaming), as well as the subscription Gameday Audio package on MLB.com and MLB.tv. All other network affiliates of the two clubs must carry the ESPN Radio feed, and they may not even be able to do so if they compete with an ESPN Radio affiliate in the same market. Additionally, the two flagships must broadcast ESPN Radio national commercials during their game coverage (though they can run live commercial reads for local sponsors during broadcasts and sell ads during typically extended pre/post-game shows. WCNN, the Atlanta Braves' flagship station, occasionally didn't air such national commercials and aired its normal local advertising during its coverage of the 2021 World Series, and also didn't credit ESPN's sponsorship). The flagship stations are also required to credit the same presenting radio sponsor of the World Series as ESPN Radio (in recent years, AutoZone).

Additionally, radio stations (including flagships) are not allowed to broadcast any MLB games in the live Internet streams of their station programming outside of the flagship station's DMA (example: WDAE, which is the Rays Radio Network flagship, is only allowed to stream its coverage within Pasco, Pinellas, and Hillsborough counties) or on out-of-market radio affiliates that carry the station's main signal. (MLB makes its own streams of the team networks available for a fee.) Some stations will replace the game with a recorded message explaining why the game cannot be heard on their stream. Others will simply stream the station's regularly scheduled programming that is being preempted by the game. Additionally, ESPN Radio also restricts online streaming of their coverage of regular season games to listeners located both within the United States and outside the markets of the teams involved in the games, regardless of the application used.

During the 2021 postseason, the Atlanta Braves streamed its coverage of their entire postseason run completely free of geo-blocking restrictions, including their NLDS, NLCS, and World Series appearances.

== See also ==
- Syndication exclusivity
