= MLB Extra Innings =

Out-of-market sports package

Ownership
- Owner: Major League Baseball

History
- Launched: March 31, 1996 (DirecTV); April 1, 2001 (cable providers)

MLB Extra Innings is an out-of-market sports package distributed in North America by satellite provider DirecTV since 1996 and by most cable providers since 2001. The package allows its subscribers to see up to 90 out-of-market Major League Baseball games a week using local over the air stations and regional sports networks.

As of the 2008 season, the feeds from both teams' broadcasts were available for each game on DirecTV, even if a team is showing the game locally on a broadcast station. Even though the package relies on satellite uplink paths, DirecTV also carries feeds from local broadcast and even cable-only networks as well, such as NBC Sports Philadelphia for the Philadelphia Phillies.

The iN DEMAND version of Extra Innings added the "dual feed" system for select broadcasts after the 2008 MLB All-Star Game. Along with this, the iN DEMAND version of MLB Extra Innings was able to add broadcast television stations, WKYC (Indians), WJZ-TV (Orioles), WUSA (Nationals), WPIX (Mets, Yankees), WPHL-TV (Phillies), and in addition, one Canadian RSN, the Toronto Blue Jays' Rogers Sportsnet feed. Previously, only one feed was available, usually the home team's. For the 2017 season, Comcast X1 customers could get all MLB EI games in HDTV, using the Beta IN DEMAND platform. DirecTV has offered all MLB EI (Most with dual HD feeds) games in HDTV for years.

Free previews of MLB Extra Innings were shown during the first week of the season, and the week after the All Star Game.

== Availability ==
MLB Extra Innings is available with these cable and satellite providers:

- United States:
  - Astound Broadband
  - C Spire
  - Comcast (Xfinity)
  - Cox Communications
  - DirecTV
  - Dish Network
  - iN DEMAND Game
  - Midcontinent Communications
  - Optimum
  - Spectrum
  - Verizon Fios
- Canada:
  - Bell Satellite TV
  - Telus TV
  - Access Communications
  - Cogeco Cable
  - EastLink Cable
  - Rogers Cable
  - Vidéotron
  - Westman Communications
  - Spectrum
- Mexico:
  - Sky México
  - Megacable
- Central America:
  - Sky México
- South America and the Caribbean:
  - Vrio.

Dish Network offered the package from 2004–2006, but as of January 2013, Dish was still not offering MLB Extra Innings. Despite the status, the satellite provider began carrying the MLB Network on September 1, 2011. On March 29, 2015, Dish announced it will again offer MLB Extra Innings.

== New contract and controversy ==
On March 6, 2007, DirecTV signed a new seven-year carriage contract with MLB. At first, it was to be an exclusive deal worth $700 million. However, as a result of viewer complaints and antitrust concerns –voiced by, among others, Massachusetts Senator John Kerry– MLB agreed to offer the package for renewal by cable systems and Dish Network. By March 9, negotiations had begun to try to settle the dispute, with a deadline of April 1, the first day of the MLB regular season. MLB demanded that the cable systems bundle the renewal of the Extra Innings package with the MLB Network, a 24-hour network in the vein of NFL Network, NBA TV, and NHL Network that MLB launched on January 1, 2009. Furthermore, these systems were asked to place the channel on an expanded digital tier. At least one major system, Time Warner Cable, balked at the terms.

The offer from the cable consortium to MLB would have matched the financing portion, but cable was only willing to put the MLB Network on a premium tier. Cable systems did guarantee to reach at least as many viewers of MLB Network as DirecTV will reach. MLB was not satisfied with the offer, and publicly claimed that the cable companies failed to meet more of the criteria for the deal than they had actually met. However, while MLB wanted the cable systems to match the same offer as DirecTV, MLB would be providing more generous benefits to DirecTV for the very same offer: DirecTV would be receiving a stake in MLB Network, thereby barring cable systems from receiving the telecasts. Hence, MLB was accused of claiming that cable would not meet the same terms as DirecTV, while not offering the same deal to the cable consortium.

As of the start of the season on April 2, only DirecTV had agreed to those terms and was able to retain Extra Innings. It would not be available on any cable system until after the deadline was extended and agreements were reached.

On April 4, MLB and iN DEMAND finally reached an agreement similar to the one that MLB reached with DirecTV. Cable companies that carry iN DEMAND resumed carrying MLB Extra Innings and also agreed to add the MLB Network upon its launch. iN DEMAND only had the authority to negotiate directly for and agree to add the MLB Network on their owners' cable systems which are made up by Comcast, Time Warner Cable, Cox Communications and Advance/Newhouse (Bright House Networks); in turn, iN DEMAND got an equity stake in the MLB Network about the same as the one DirecTV received. Cablevision which had been asking for their own equity stake as terms for them to agree to add the MLB Network came to terms with iN DEMAND and Major League Baseball on May 4, 2007 which was iN DEMAND and MLB's deadline for cable companies and Dish Network to reach a deal. Dish never came to an agreement and did not carry the package until a new deal was reached with MLB on March 31, 2015. Cablevision agreed to carry the MLB Network without getting the equity stake in it. Charter Communications also reached an agreement with MLB.

iN DEMAND places MLB Extra Innings on the same channels as its NHL Center Ice service. Some providers, like Comcast and Suddenlink Communications, may not offer all 14 MLB game channels. Because of hockey games shown on the same channels (particularly in April), some nights on Comcast and Suddenlink see no more than 2 or 3 games being shown. Some Comcast cable systems do carry all 14 game channels, while some systems have limited number of channels. DirecTV customers do not have this problem, as their 15 channels (mostly RSN remaps) are dedicated solely to baseball.

== Additional "Superfan" feature ==
In 2008, MLB Extra Innings on DirecTV launched a "Superfan" premium package similar to that available from NFL Sunday Ticket. This included a "Game Mix" with eight games on the same channel, and a "Strike Zone Channel" with live cut-ins to the night's games. It was commercial free and also available in HD.

DirecTV subscribers with the Superfan package also received access to up to 40 games in HD each week. In 2007, at least 10 games each week were in HD. HD equipment is required. Superfan cost an additional $50 on top of the MLB Extra Innings package subscription cost as well as requires one to subscribe to the $9.99 HD monthly access fee.

Beginning with the 2009 MLB season, "Superfan" no longer was offered as an option with MLB Extra Innings on DirecTV. Instead, the up to 40 HD games per week were part of the base package, provided to subscribers who already possess HD-ready equipment, and who paid the aforementioned HD monthly access fee.

== Blackout restrictions ==
=== United States ===
Game broadcasts of a major league team in its home market are blacked out in that area if the same game is on the Extra Innings schedule. In most cases, these games can be seen locally on a broadcast or cable/satellite network. (If both feeds are available, as noted above, they are both blacked out.)

Games broadcast exclusively on ESPN are not available on Extra Innings. Beginning in the 2014 season, Fox broadcasts not shown on a local affiliate are available on Extra Innings.

Chicago Cubs and Chicago White Sox games formerly broadcast nationally via WGN America but still shown on WGN-TV in the Chicago area were available through the DirecTV version of Extra Innings from 2015-19. This also was the case for Cubs games televised by WLS-TV.

ESPN has exclusive broadcast rights for Sunday evening games. Any game starting after 5:10 p.m. Eastern on Sundays will not be broadcast on MLB Extra Innings. ESPN also televises a number of other games throughout the week. These, however, are not blacked out.

=== Canada ===
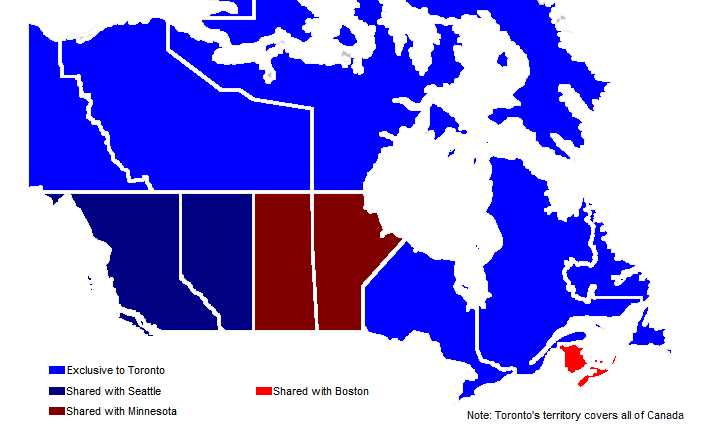
Canadian MLB Blackout map

Nationally-broadcast Toronto Blue Jays games and Sunday Night Baseball are not made available on Extra Innings and are available on Sportsnet and TSN2 respectively. All remaining televised games, including Major League Baseball on Fox, ESPN Major League Baseball and Major League Baseball on TBS are shown without exclusivity. New York Mets and New York Yankees games on WPIX-TV are not blacked out, nor were Chicago Cubs and White Sox games broadcast on WGN-TV. Out-of-market and shared territory games that air on Sportsnet's regional feeds are not blacked out, but may be subject to improper use of the simultaneous substitution rules.

== Package price history ==
Many cable and satellite companies offer "early bird" package prices if ordered by the first week of the season or for automatic renewal, with some providers also offering a free subscription for the season for MLB.tv. The following prices were for the regular listed price per season for the cable packages.

- 1996-2000: $139
- 2001: $149
- 2002: $159
- 2008: $199
- 2009: $191.94 (early renewal price)
- 2010: $199
- 2011: $209.94
- 2012: $223.96
- 2015: $197.94 (early renewal price)

DIRECTV has historically charged less for their SD only package than cable ($219 to renew and $179 for early bird in 2008) and instead offered HD and 'Superfan' for an additional charge.

DirecTV's first published prices (aka early bird) through the years: 2008:$179, 2009:$189, 2010:$192, 2011:$204 2012:$210

== See also ==
- MLB.tv, the online equivalent service of MLB Extra Innings
- NFL Sunday Ticket
- NBA League Pass
- NHL Center Ice
- NASCAR Hot Pass
- MLS Direct Kick
- List of current Major League Baseball announcers
- Major League Baseball on regional sports networks
