= NHL Center Ice =

United States television sports package

- Country: United States; Canada

Programming
- Languages: English; French

Ownership
- Owner: National Hockey League

History
- Launched: October 1995

NHL Center Ice is an out-of-market sports package distributed by most cable and satellite providers in the United States and Canada. The package allows its subscribers to see up to forty out-of-market National Hockey League games a week using local and national television networks.

NHL Center Ice includes Canadian broadcasts, such as games broadcast on Sportsnet, as well as Hockey Night in Canada broadcasts on CBC, Sportsnet, and Citytv. It also has included out-of-region games broadcast on ABC, ESPN, and TNT/TBS. Occasionally, French-language feeds from TVA Sports may be used if no English-language broadcast is available. Pay-per-view games (e.g. Edmonton Oilers) are included as well. For some cable viewers and those subscribing via Dish Network or DirecTV, both teams' feeds are available for most games. Other cable subscribers may be limited to only one feed and also have a smaller selection of high-definition games.

Some providers offer high definition broadcasts when available. A number of providers put Center Ice on the same channels as MLB Extra Innings; hockey often gets priority because the conflict occurs during April, at the end of the regular season and beginning of the playoffs.

A free preview is usually shown during the first three weeks of the NHL season and right after (or a few weeks after) the All Star Game (or, until 2014, the Olympic break in years when the Winter Olympics occur).

== Games not televised on NHL Center Ice ==
- Games which are nationally televised in the U.S. on ABC, ESPN, TNT, TBS, or NHL Network. (Subscribers get NHL Network for free when they buy Center Ice, unless they subscribe through Spectrum or Verizon Fios, which at this time do not include NHL Network as part of the Center Ice package.)
- High-definition feeds of games originating on MSG, MSGSN, MSG Western New York, MSG2, and MSGSN2 on Dish Network
- OTA Broadcasts (Only shown when it is the only broadcast available for that game).
- RDS and RDS2 (French-speaking Canadiens and Senators broadcast); these broadcasts are shown only when there is not an English broadcast available.

== Availability ==
NHL Center Ice is available with these cable and satellite providers:

=== United States ===
- Adams Cable
- Astound Broadband
- Blue Ridge Communications
- Charter Communications (Spectrum)
- Comcast (Xfinity) – part owner
- Cox Communications – part owner
- DirecTV
- Dish Network
- iN DEMAND
- Midcontinent Communications
- Optimum
- Service Electric Cable TV & Communications
- Sling TV
- Summit Broadband
- Verizon Fios

=== Canada ===
- Bell Aliant
- Bell MTS
- Bell Fibe TV
- Eastlink
- Rogers
- Shaw
- SaskTel
- Access Communications
- Cogeco Cable
- Eastlink Cable
- Northwestel

== See also ==
- NFL Sunday Ticket
- NBA League Pass
- MLS Direct Kick
- MLB Extra Innings
- NASCAR Hot Pass
- List of current NHL broadcasters
