= Adams Cable =

American cable provider

Adams Cable Service
- Company type: Private
- Industry: Telecommunications, Entertainment
- Founded: 1949
- Defunct: 2025; 1 year ago
- Headquarters: Carbondale, Pennsylvania
- Key people: Douglas Adams, President & CEO; Wendy Hartman, General Manager
- Products: Cable television, Internet service provider, VoIP
- Parent: Blue Ridge Communications
- Website: http://www.adamscable.com/

Adams Cable was a local cable television and Internet provider that served northeast Pennsylvania along with rural Broome, Chenango and Delaware counties in New York.

In April 2024, Adams CATV, Inc., operator of Adams Cable Service, agreed to be acquired by Blue Ridge Communications, following regulatory approval proceedings in New York and Pennsylvania, and the sale closed in October 2024. Adams Cable was maintained as a separate operation until November 2025, when operations were fully transferred to Blue Ridge Communications.
