= NBA League Pass =

Sports television service

Ownership
- Owner: National Basketball Association

History
- Launched: 1995 (DirecTV); 2001 (cable providers)

Links
- Website: Official website

NBA League Pass is the National Basketball Association's direct-to-consumer subscription-based product that provides live and on-demand NBA games. It is available to subscribers in the United States and also as an international package for all other countries. TV versions can be viewed through a cable or satellite TV provider, as well as an over-the-top streaming service operated by the league.

During the 2021–22 regular season, NBA League Pass saw a 30 percent increase in global subscribers. Total viewership numbers are unclear.

== United States League Pass ==
NBA League Pass in the U.S. is an out-of-market sports package that allows its subscribers to watch up to 40 out-of-market National Basketball Association games a week. Videos of the games come from local stations and regional sports networks. A TV version, NBA League Pass TV, is available through a cable or satellite TV provider, as well as an over-the-top streaming version directly from NBA.com.

=== Blackout restrictions ===
If a local team is playing and the game is televised in the home market, the associated feed on League Pass is blacked out and unavailable for viewing. Nationally televised games on ABC, NBC, ESPN, and NBA TV are also blacked out.

=== Streaming version ===
A streaming version of NBA League Pass is available on NBA.com. It offers both live and on-demand replays of games dating back to the 2012–13 season. The national and local blackout restrictions apply for streaming live games. On-demand classic games and documentaries are also available, as well as live access to NBA TV. A premium tier of the service also allows subscribers to stream on two devices simultaneously, as well view in-arena content during commercial breaks.

=== Availability on TV ===
NBA League Pass TV is or has been available at some point with these cable, satellite and streaming providers in the United States:

- U-verse TV
- DirecTV
- Dish Network
- FuboTV
- iN DEMAND Team
  - Adams Cable
  - Blue Ridge Communications
  - Optimum Communications
  - Comcast (Xfinity)
  - Cox Communications
  - Frontier Communications
  - RCN
  - Charter Communications (Spectrum)
  - Verizon Fios
- Sling TV
- YouTube
  - YouTube TV
- B/R Live
- Yahoo! Sports (Only on mobile and tablet devices)
- Amazon Prime Video

Most providers who offer subscriptions to League Pass TV also include NBA TV and a companion League Pass Broadband subscription. It is also included in some cable subscriptions.

== NBA League Pass International ==
NBA International League Pass is available to users living outside the United States, and differs from the US version of the product in its content, packaging, and pricing. While both the US and international products feature games available for live or on-demand viewing, the major distinction between the two products is that International League Pass provides access to all NBA games played during the regular season, All Star Weekend, Playoffs, and Finals, free from blackout restrictions. The single exception to this offering is in Canada, where games televised nationally are blacked out live and are available for on-demand viewing only after the game is completed. International League Pass also provides access to games from previous seasons through archives.

International users have the option of subscribing to several package options, varying by region: NBA League Pass, League Pass Premium, Team Choice, Game Choice, and 3-Game Choice. Subscribers to all packages are able to watch NBA games from Summer League, preseason, regular season, All Star Weekend, Playoffs, and Finals live or on-demand from a variety of devices, including desktop computers, iPhones, iPads, Android phones and tablets, and TV-connected devices like Apple TV, Android TV, Google Chromecast, Xbox and PlayStation consoles (the platforms supported differ by country). Subscribers are also able to use in-game features including multi-game viewing, stats windows, and a condensed game feature that only includes scoring and highlight plays. Additional features, such as access to NBA TV and multi-device streaming, vary by subscription.

Beginning in the 2014–15 season, NBA International League Pass introduced continuous game feeds for selected games and all home feeds, which replaced the game break videos (highlights, commercials, etc.) shown during play breaks with highlight clips, live footage of in-arena activities including dance team performances, half-time entertainment, fans in the crowd, and interviews or features produced by the local broadcaster.

=== International packages and promotions ===
In addition to the standard and Premium packages, users also have the option to purchase a stand-alone streaming subscription to NBA TV International, which broadcasts games, studio shows, press conferences, and other basketball content. In past seasons, International League Pass has also offered sampling packages that provide stand-alone access to Christmas Day games and All Star Weekend events. The last several weeks of the regular season have also been made available in a separate "Race to the Playoffs" package.

During the off-season, both International League Pass and International League Pass Premium subscribers have live and on-demand access to Summer League games and certain games or scrimmages played by the USA Basketball team in preparation for or during the Olympics and the FIBA World Cup tournament, in addition to continued access to past NBA regular seasons in archives. This summer content has also been sold as a stand-alone package.

International League Pass offers a rolling free trial of the product throughout the season, allowing first time users to preview the League Pass experience before purchasing.

=== NBA League Pass availability outside the United States ===
Note: Subscriptions can be bought in most regions via the Internet to be streamed to applications on various devices or to a browser (see above for list). Some of the following services include League Pass, either fully or partially, but they are not required to view League Pass.

- Brazil
  - Vivo TV
- Canada:
  - Bell Satellite TV
  - Shaw Direct
  - Cogeco Cable
  - EastLink Cable
  - Rogers Cable
- China
  - Migu
- Mexico and Central America:
  - Sky México
- Philippines:
  - Cablelink, Globe, Converge ICT, Sky Cable, and PLDT/Smart
- South America and Caribbean (except Brazil):
  - Vrio
- Argentina, Paraguay and Uruguay:
  - Flow (Coming Soon)
- Spain:
  - Movistar Plus+ (Coming Soon)
  - Vodafone TV (Coming Soon)
  - Orange TV (Coming Soon)
  - Euskaltel (Coming Soon)
  - Telecable (Coming Soon)
  - R (Coming Soon)
  - Virgin telco (Coming Soon)
- United Kingdom:
  - Sky Sports
- Vietnam:
  - VTV Cab

== Applications, features and platforms supported ==
Apps are currently available for:

- Smart TVs (depends on manufacturer/model)
- Apple TV
- Xbox 360
- Xbox One
- Xbox Series X/S
- Android devices
- iOS devices
- Windows Phone
- Roku
- Amazon Kindle Fire
- PlayStation 4
- PlayStation 5
- Amazon Fire TV
- Chromecast
- Android TV

For the 2013–14 season, League Pass's apps were updated with the ability to select home and away feeds on all games, and video-on-demand access for games broadcast nationally.

For the 2016–17 season, a new feature known as "Mobile View" was introduced, which allows viewers to access a special feed of the home telecast with optimizations for viewing on smartphones. The Mobile View feed will utilize a new dedicated camera angle with a tighter, zoomed-in shot of gameplay. The league will provide a camera and a producer for the feature at each regular-season game, who will have access to the special camera and all others in use for the production.

== WNBA League Pass ==
WNBA League Pass
Ownership
- Owner: Women's National Basketball Association

History
- Launched: 2016

In 2016, the WNBA launched WNBA League Pass which featured live out-of-market games. The service includes a full-season, one-team, and single-game package. Nationally televised games are only available as archives, and are not available live on the service.

As of 2023, Athletes Unlimited Basketball games are also available on the platform.

Former WNBA Season Pass logo used from 1998 until 2001.

== Summer League Pass ==
The 2013 NBA Summer League was available as a streaming subscription service with an app' for IOS and Android devices in the 2013 off-season. Priced at $14.99, all 61 games in both the Orlando Pro Summer League and the Las Vegas League were included in the price. Summer League is now included as part of the standard League Pass offering internationally.

== See also ==
- NFL Sunday Ticket
- MLS Direct Kick
- MLB Extra Innings
- NHL Center Ice
- NASCAR Hot Pass
- National Basketball Association criticisms and controversies
