= NASCAR Hot Pass =

Former sports television service

logo

NASCAR Hot Pass was a sports television package available exclusively on DirecTV in the United States, in Canada on several providers and in South America and the Caribbean on DirecTV Latin America. It debuted at the 2007 Daytona 500, which aired on February 18 of that year. In 2007 and 2008, it was a pay-per-view subscription package. However, from 2009 to 2012, it was free for all DirecTV subscribers, and the features were noticeably downgraded. As of the 2013 season, DirecTV stopped offering the service when its sponsorship agreement with NASCAR was not renewed.

== History ==
NASCAR Hot Pass debuted at the 2007 Daytona 500 on February 18. Kevin Harvick, who was seen on channel 797, was the race winner. Five channels, 795 to 799, featured different drivers, while a "mix" channel, 794, was a miniature version of each of the driver channels and links to their full screens. On the day after each race, channel 793 was used for "shortcuts," 30-minute excerpts of the previous day's (or night's) coverage. Both options have since been eliminated.

The in-car audio option was added at the UAW-DaimlerChrysler 400 on March 11.

=== 2007–2008: pay-per-view version ===
NASCAR Hot Pass included a view of the race from a driver's in-car camera, unedited communications between the driver, crew chief, and spotter, and telemetry showing the car's speed and horsepower. Part of the screen also included the live nationwide race broadcast, from either Fox, TNT, or ESPN.

The annual price was $99 per year, paid in two monthly installments of $49.50 each. As with all other DirecTV PPV sports packages, there was expected to be an annual renewal discount for subscribers with an account in good standing.

In mid-May 2007, DirecTV began offering a discounted rate of $79 for the remaining races of the season. In July, the price was slashed again, this time to $59. In each case, there were again two installments. From late August through the end of the season, the price was $19.95 for up to the final 11 races, the same price as each individual race up to that time.

In 2008, DirecTV offered a special rate of $40 for the entire season for new subscribers.

In 2007 and 2008, Hot Pass consisted of 10 channels between 790 and 799. The first four channels, 790 through 793, showed drivers selected by the producers and DirecTV. The drivers varied from race to race and will depend on a number of factors, including driver popularity and past performance on a given track. In addition, for some races, one driver was selected based on an online vote. For example, the 2008 Daytona 500 free preview had Dale Earnhardt Jr., Jeff Gordon, Kevin Harvick, and Tony Stewart.

During the race, viewers had the option of the live official telecast audio, the separate broadcast dedicated to the driver, and in-car communications between the driver and his team. During commercials, only the broadcast audio and in-car channel are available. Also during the breaks, race action is still available, but on a much smaller screen than at other times.

The fifth channel (794) simulcasted the main broadcast and provided subscribers a choice of 12 other audio channels from the drivers not chosen otherwise. Kurt Busch, Michael Waltrip, and Carl Edwards were among the options at the free preview.

Channels 795 through 799, the original Hot Pass channels, had the same features, only with high-definition video and enhanced-quality audio. HD equipment is required to access these channels.

If a driver already chosen has been eliminated from the race before its conclusion, other drivers were substituted. For example, Jimmie Johnson replaced Gordon at the 2008 Daytona 500, and Denny Hamlin filled in for Stewart at the same race the year before. Also, two substitutions were made on the same channel at the 2007 Pepsi 400, also a free preview, as J. J. Yeley filled in for Harvick, who in turn substituted for Stewart.

=== 2009–2012: free version ===
On December 10, 2008, NASCAR and DirecTV mutually agreed to end Hot Pass as a pay-per-view package. For the next four seasons, the package was free to all DirecTV subscribers. The 4 driver channels (795-798) were still available and in HD, however all other features were removed.

The free version consisted of a split screen shot of the featured drivers' in-car cameras on one side and a simulcast of the official race coverage on the other. The simulcast included full audio, so sometimes two different audio feeds (the MRN/PRN Radio broadcast and the teams' two-way radio) are heard simultaneously. In some instances, including the red-flag delay and eventual ending to the 2009 Daytona 500, the network telecast was shown alone within a frame. Like the pay-per-view format, the in-car camera shots were commercial-free.

Starting with the 2012 Pennsylvania 400 at the Pocono Raceway, it was made available exclusively to HD customers and features were removed from SD customers. No reason was publicly given, and whether it was a precursor to the eventual decision to drop the service entirely is unknown.

=== Driver appearances and performances ===
The following drivers were chosen for the two seasons that it was on pay-per-view: Dale Earnhardt Jr., Jeff Gordon, Tony Stewart, Denny Hamlin, Jeff Burton, Carl Edwards, Kurt Busch, Kevin Harvick, Juan Pablo Montoya, Greg Biffle, Jimmie Johnson, Matt Kenseth, David Stremme, Mark Martin, Ryan Newman, Clint Bowyer, Dale Jarrett, Jamie McMurray, Robby Gordon, Michael Waltrip, Kasey Kahne, Dave Blaney, Reed Sorenson, J. J. Yeley, Boris Said, and Martin Truex Jr.

Earnhardt Jr. appeared most frequently in 2007, being shown on 24 occasions. However, he was pulled from the lineup during the Chase for the NEXTEL Cup, for which he failed to qualify, after he had become a regular on almost a weekly basis, as NASCAR and DirecTV agreed to focus on the drivers that made the Chase.

Seven drivers won races on the same week(s) that they were featured in that first season: Kevin Harvick (Daytona 500, NASCAR NEXTEL All-Star Challenge), Matt Kenseth (Auto Club 500), Jimmie Johnson (Kobalt Tools 500), Jeff Gordon (Aaron's 499 and UAW-Ford 500), Juan Pablo Montoya (Toyota/Save Mart 350), Tony Stewart (Allstate 400 at the Brickyard and Centurion Boats at the Glen), and Carl Edwards (Sharpie 500 and Dodge Dealers 400).

== Announcers in 2007 and 2008 ==
NASCAR Hot Pass used announcers separate from the main national television broadcasts. For example, Rick Allen and Phil Parsons called the races when Dale Earnhardt Jr. appeared on this package. Other commentators frequently heard were Wendy Venturini, Hermie Sadler, Doug Rice, Adam Alexander, and Pat Patterson. (Venturini became the first woman to call a NASCAR race when she did the lap-by-lap of Robby Gordon at the Toyota/Save Mart 350.) Steve Byrnes, Darrell Waltrip, Larry McReynolds, Brad Sham and Barry LeBrock made occasional or one-shot appearances.

When Waltrip made his debut at the Pepsi 400, his signature race-beginning call of "boogity boogity boogity" was simulcast on all five channels.

Mike Joy and former WRC (Washington, D.C.) sportscaster George Michael were also linked to reports that they will be on Hot Pass; however, they never appeared as far as is known.

== NASCAR iN Car ==
NASCAR Hot Pass had similar to another service called NASCAR iN Car. NASCAR iN Car was started in 2003 by iN Demand Networks and was exclusive to digital cable subscribers for three years.

NASCAR iN Car was discontinued after the introduction of NASCAR Hot Pass. NASCAR Hot Pass performed better than NASCAR iN Car. NASCAR Hot Pass had 100,000 more subscribers than NASCAR iN Car in 2007. NASCAR iN Car had 30,000 subscribers in 2006. The price for a season of NASCAR iN Car was the same as NASCAR Hot Pass

== Availability ==
NASCAR Hot Pass was available through the following cable and satellite providers:

- United States:
  - DirecTV
- Canada:
  - Bell Satellite TV
  - TELUS Satellite TV
    - Cogeco
    - EastLink Cable
    - Rogers Cable
- South America and Caribbean:

== See also ==
- NFL Sunday Ticket
- MLB Extra Innings
- NBA League Pass
- NHL Center Ice
- MLS Direct Kick
- NCAA Mega March Madness
