= NFL Sunday Ticket =

American football subscription television package

- Broadcast area: United States (residential via YouTube TV, commercial via EverPass Media); Canada (via DAZN); Mexico and Central America (Sky México); the Caribbean; South America

Programming
- Language: English

Ownership
- Owner: National Football League

History
- Launched: September 4, 1994; 32 years ago

Links
- Website: Official website

NFL Sunday Ticket is an out-of-market sports package that broadcasts National Football League (NFL) regular season games unavailable on local affiliates. Launched on September 4, 1994, It carries all the regional Sunday afternoon games produced by Fox and CBS. The package is marketed to primarily fans who are unable to see their team on local television because they do not reside in one of that team's markets or sports bars and sportsbooks who want to increase business by attracting fans of out of market teams.

Beginning with the 2023 NFL season for residential customers in the United States, NFL Sunday Ticket moved exclusively to YouTube TV as well as the NFL RedZone for YouTube's recently launched Primetime Channels service as a standalone subscription option. The league then formed a new company called EverPass Media to distribute the package to bars, sportsbooks, restaurants and other commercial venues. From 1994 through the end of the 2022 NFL season, the package was distributed in the United States exclusively by DirecTV (which also offered it on the Internet on certain tablets and smartphones and JetBlue flights).

NFL Sunday Ticket is also currently offered in Canada on streaming service DAZN, in Mexico and Central America on Sky México in South America and the Caribbean on Vrio and several cable providers in The Bahamas and Bermuda.

== United States ==
Satellite television provider DirecTV had exclusive rights to the NFL Sunday Ticket package in the United States until the end of the 2022 NFL season. Although other satellite and cable providers supposedly were allowed to bid on the rights to carry NFL Sunday Ticket if they agreed to carry the NFL Network, DirecTV decided to extend their contract beyond 2014 by paying the NFL $1.5 billion per year for the next eight years. Reaching the deal was also a condition of AT&T's 2015 acquisition of DirecTV. As of the 2015 season, the service was available through an online-only subscription exclusively for those who are unable to use DirecTV services. Beginning with the 2023 NFL season, NFL Sunday Ticket moved exclusively to YouTube TV for residential customers.

NFL Sunday Ticket viewers do not count towards local Nielsen ratings. Thus, offering NFL Sunday Ticket on cable cost CBS and Fox affiliates millions of dollars in lost revenue from local commercial breaks (as opposed to national ads sold by the networks). In turn, affiliates help subsidize the networks' programming costs. Therefore, CBS and Fox have rules in their broadcasting contracts that mandate that NFL Sunday Ticket subscribers must be charged at a premium price.

=== Blackouts ===
Sunday afternoon games scheduled to air on the local Fox and CBS affiliates (1998–present) within a viewer's designated media market (determined by the ZIP Code of the viewer's address) are blacked out on the NFL Sunday Ticket feed. Viewers must watch these games on their local broadcast stations instead. (This applies to live streaming of said games as well.)

Until the end of the 2014 season, if a game the viewer wished to watch was blacked out in their home market because it was not sold out, the game remained blacked out on NFL Sunday Ticket. Games joined or switched away from in progress usually had their blackout status altered immediately. The NFL suspended the local blackout policy for the 2015 NFL regular season, and has since done so indefinitely.

=== Extra features ===
Until the end of the 2022 season, DirecTV offered the following extra features. From 2005 to 2009 these features were part of an add-on package called Superfan and cost $100 extra. Beginning in 2012, some of them were part of the NFL Sunday Ticket Max package which cost an extra $100.

From 2009 to 2019, all games were in high definition. The HD games were formerly part of the Superfan package.

==== Game Mix ====
This channel showed eight games at once, along with the game's score, time left in the game, and the quarter that the game is in under the game's feed. Starting in 2008, it added a high-definition feed, and in 2011, it added larger cells when four or fewer games are being played.

==== Red Zone Channel ====
The Red Zone Channel offered a commercial-free "whiparound" coverage of all NFL games in progress on Sunday afternoons, highlighting key plays (scoring plays, key turnovers, etc.). The channel was launched in 2005 and hosted by Andrew Siciliano. In the earlier years, only FOX games were featured in the channel. While nearly identical in format, the DirecTV Red Zone Channel was separate from the NFL RedZone service hosted by Scott Hanson that launched four years later in 2009, which is produced by NFL Network and distributed to other television providers and platforms. The two services co-existed until the 2023 season; the YouTube TV version of Sunday Ticket only carries the NFL RedZone channel.

==== Fantasy Zone Channel ====
Originally hosted by Kay Adams, and later by Dan Hellie, the Fantasy Zone Channel offered valuable insights, last-minute roster tips, live updates, top-scoring players on the day, and advice to fantasy players before and after kickoff.

==== Short Cuts ====
This two-channel duo recapped every NFL game in 30 minutes or less, including games not available on NFL Sunday Ticket because they were televised locally or blacked out. One channel shows AFC games while the other shows NFC games. These highlights are made available on Sunday nights and are shown continuously until Tuesday morning. From 2012 to 2022, it was only available on the NFL Sunday Ticket Max package.

==== Highlights on Demand ====
DirecTV subscribers with interactive DVRs received a three- to four-minute recap of every NFL Sunday Ticket game on demand with this feature, via channel 1005.

==== NFL.com Fantasy Football TV app ====
Starting in 2011, the NFL.com Fantasy Football TV app has allowed NFL.com fantasy players with Internet-connected set-top boxes to view their NFL.com Fantasy Football teams and scores directly on their TV screen.

=== Computers, tablets and smartphones ===
NFL Sunday Ticket Max subscribers were able to stream games on the Internet and their smartphones and tablets. Starting in 2009, NFL Sunday Ticket To Go became available to non-DirecTV subscribers who were unable to receive satellite television in their homes or apartments due to line of sight issues, costing $50 more than those with DirecTV service. DirecTV offered NFL Sunday Ticket To Go on Motorola Xoom and Samsung Galaxy tablets; Motorola Android phones; the iPad, iPhone, iPod Touch, BlackBerry OS devices with 3G or wifi, Palm Pre/Pixi, and other Droid-branded phones.

=== Gaming consoles ===
For those who did have DirecTV, the NFL also offered the Sunday Ticket package for the PlayStation 3, PlayStation 4, Xbox 360 and Xbox One video game consoles.

=== JetBlue ===
Between September 26, 2010 and December 29, 2019, DirecTV offered the full slate of NFL Sunday Ticket games on JetBlue flights to 50 destinations across the United States.

=== EverPass Media ===
The NFL announced on March 28, 2023, that it had partnered with RedBird Capital to form a new company known as EverPass Media to distribute commercial rights to NFL Sunday Ticket, allowing bars, restaurants, casinos, and other commercial venues to continue showing games without reconfiguring their systems to accommodate a streaming-only platform. EverPass then reached its first agreement with DirecTV on May 25, 2023, to sell NFL Sunday Ticket directly to its business customers.

In August 2023, EverPass Media signed a multi-year agreement to distribute commercial rights to Peacock Sports Pass, which delivers limited live sports content from the streaming service Peacock. In July 2024, EverPass Media received an additional investment from Endeavor subsidiary TKO Group Holdings (owner of UFC and WWE), with Mark Shapiro joining its board of directors as a result. EverPass also announced its acquisition of out-of-home media provider UpShow.

In March 2026, EverPass announced that it would become the exclusive provider of Sunday Ticket to commercial providers, ending a three-year agreement with DirecTV to continue delivering the service to commercial customers. However, EverPass announced before the start of the 2026 season that DirectTV would continue to be a commercial distributor under a new, multi-year agreement.

In August 2026, DAZN announced that it would acquire EverPass Media, renaming it "DAZN for Business"; DAZN has worked with EverPass to distribute its broadcasts of the 2025 FIFA Club World Cup. As part of the acquisition, the NFL, RedBird, and TKO Group Holdings will receive minority stakes in DAZN.

== History ==
The concept of NFL Sunday Ticket was largely invented by entrepreneur and later television personality Jon Taffer during his three-year term on the board of NFL Enterprises, along with NFL Chief of Marketing Michael Miller. NFL Sunday Ticket was launched in 1994 and was initially available on C band and K_{u} band satellites, for which the receiving dishes are larger in size. DirecTV would become involved later in the 1994 season, airing the NFL Sunday Ticket package in the last 5 weeks of the regular season, before beginning to air the package in full the following year. In 1998, the service became available to cable systems in Canada, with the first systems to offer the service being Rogers Cable in Ontario. The exclusivity of Sunday Ticket to cable providers resulted in a complaint from ExpressVu (now Bell Satellite TV) to the CRTC, seeking to force the NFL to open the service to Canadian satellite providers; the CRTC dismissed the complaint.

DirecTV was under contract to carry NFL Sunday Ticket until the end of the 2022 season. The service and its majority owner, AT&T, were on the record as questioning the value of the package with less than half of the subscribers DirecTV would need to break even using Sunday Ticket plus the league adding more games outside the traditional Sunday afternoon windows. On opening weekend of the 2021 season, CNBC reported that the league was interested in partnering with a streaming service for future rights, along with a stake in NFL Network. This would end DirecTV's relationship with the NFL after nearly three decades. In July 2022, NFL commissioner Roger Goodell told CNBC that the league would select a streaming service to host Sunday Ticket, with the winning service being announced that fall. Leading streaming providers Amazon, Apple Inc., and ESPN were all candidates to win the contract. That month, The New York Times reported that YouTube had also submitted a bid for Sunday Ticket. In October, CNBC reported that Apple wanted flexible and unrestricted global streaming rights, something that the NFL cannot offer due its existing deals with CBS and Fox that guarantee exclusivity of local games.

On December 22, 2022, the league announced that NFL Sunday Ticket would move exclusively to YouTube TV and YouTube's recently launched Primetime Channels service for residential customers.

== Antitrust lawsuit ==
In 2015, a class-action lawsuit was filed on behalf of NFL Sunday Ticket subscribers, alleging that the NFL, its member teams, its broadcast partners, and DirecTV engaged in a conspiracy to violate antitrust law, by granting DirecTV exclusive rights to sell the Sunday Ticket product, thereby restricting competition and forcing viewers to pay supercompetitive prices to view out-of-market games.

In June 2024, arguments in the case began in federal court, with the class of plaintiffs covered by the lawsuit having grown to include more than 2.4 million residential and 48,000 commercial subscribers to NFL Sunday Ticket between 2011 and 2023. The suit is seeking $7.1 billion in damages, with potential treble damages amounting to $21 billion. On June 27, a jury in Los Angeles found that the NFL had violated antitrust law in setting the price of the package and ordered a penalty totaling more than $4.7 billion. With triple damages allowed under federal antitrust laws, the NFL could ultimately be liable for $14.39 billion. The league said it would ask the judge to set the verdict aside then appeal the verdict if needed. On August 1, Judge Philip Gutierrez overturned the verdict, ruling that two experts' testimony employed flawed methodologies. Without that expert testimony, the Judge ruled, "no reasonable jury could have found class-wide injury or damages."

== International distribution ==
NFL Sunday Ticket has also been available in Mexico, Latin America, Bermuda, The Bahamas and Canada. In most cases, alternate services like NFL Game Pass International have since replaced NFL Sunday Ticket in international countries and territories, though the service remains available internationally in limited circumstances as discussed below.

=== Canada ===
NFL Sunday Ticket was previously available in Canada through most major pay television providers, often in a bundle with other sports packages. In July 2017, it was announced that the streaming service DAZN had acquired the rights to the NFL's out-of-market package beginning in the 2017 NFL season. The games previously available through this service, as well as NFL Game Pass, are bundled with the provider's service in Canada.

However, after DAZN's Canadian launch was met with frequent technical problems and user criticism, DAZN announced that it had begun to offer NFL Sunday Ticket to television providers as an alternative to its over-the-top product.

=== Mexico and Central America ===
- Sky México

=== South America and the Caribbean ===
- DirecTV

=== Brazil ===
- Vivo TV

=== Bahamas ===
- Cable Bahamas

== See also ==
- NBA League Pass
- MLS Direct Kick
- MLB Extra Innings
- NHL Center Ice (U.S.)/NHL Centre Ice (Canada)
- NASCAR Hot Pass
