= Blue Ridge Communications =

Telecommunications provider in Pennsylvania

Blue Ridge
- Type: Private
- Industry: Telecommunications
- Founded: 1950 as Palmerton TV Signal Corporation
- Headquarters: Palmerton, Pennsylvania
- Products: Cable television, broadband internet, Voice over IP, mobile services, smart home security
- Website: https://www.brctv.com/

Blue Ridge Communications is an American telecommunications provider offering cable television, broadband internet, digital voice, smart home security, and mobile services across eastern and central Pennsylvania. Headquartered in Palmerton, Pennsylvania, the company serves communities throughout the Pocono Mountains and surrounding regions. Blue Ridge Communications operates as a division of Pencor Services, Inc., and traces its origins to 1950, making it one of the longest‑operating cable providers in the United States.

== History ==
Blue Ridge Communications began in 1950 as the Palmerton TV Signal Corporation, created to improve television reception in rural Pennsylvania by delivering broadcast signals via coaxial cable from a mountaintop antenna. Throughout the 1960s and 1970s, the company expanded its cable footprint as demand for subscription television increased in rural communities.

By the early 2000s, Blue Ridge had introduced broadband internet and digital voice services, aligning with national trends in cable‑based telecommunications.

== Infrastructure ==
Blue Ridge Communications operates a hybrid fiber‑coaxial (HFC) network across its Pennsylvania service area. In 2022, the company launched a multi‑year initiative to transition its network to fiber‑to‑the‑home (FTTH), rebuilding approximately 8,000 miles of infrastructure and expanding high‑speed broadband access to more than 250,000 homes. Independent industry coverage has highlighted Blue Ridge Communications’ ongoing fiber network expansion and service improvements. In a 2024 customer satisfaction survey conducted by CTAM and HarrisX and reported by Cablefax, the company ranked among the top U.S. cable operators, with continued investment in multi-gigabit speeds and a systemwide fiber buildout cited as key factors in improving reliability and customer experience.

== Corporate structure ==
Blue Ridge Communications operates as a division of Pencor Services, Inc., a diversified communications and media company based in Pennsylvania.

Pencor’s holdings include telecommunications, publishing, and broadcast media businesses.

In 2024, Blue Ridge Cable Technologies agreed to acquire Adams CATV, Inc., operator of Adams Cable Service, following regulatory approval proceedings in New York and Pennsylvania.

== Services ==
Blue Ridge Communications provides a range of residential and business telecommunications services, including:

- Cable television packages with local, regional, and national programming
- High-speed broadband internet, including fiber-to-the-home (FTTH) service, with advertised speeds of up to 8 Gbit/s in select areas
- Voice over IP (VoIP) telephone service
- Smart home security systems, including monitoring and connected home devices
- Mobile service, offered through a mobile virtual network operator (MVNO) partnership

Independent industry analysis has evaluated Blue Ridge Communications’ broadband performance, noting improvements in customer satisfaction alongside ongoing investments in network reliability and fiber expansion.

== See also ==
- Cable television in the United States
- Telecommunications in the United States
