= Out-of-market sports package =

Subscription package of televised sports events

In North America, an out-of-market sports package is a form of subscription television that broadcasts sporting events to areas where the events were unable to be seen by viewers on other broadcast and cable television networks due to the games not being broadcast in their local market.

Many leagues with major television contracts establish elaborate rules regarding which games are broadcast in different regions (with local teams usually getting preference). For viewers who prefer to see a game other than the one being locally broadcast in their designated market area, the out-of-market package provides additional options.

== Packages ==
=== Cable, satellite, streaming ===
- MLB Extra Innings - Available to DirecTV and most digital cable providers. Provides full access to MLB.tv
- MLS Season Pass - Exclusive to Apple TV for residential and mobile accounts, exclusive to DirecTV for business accounts. No in market blackouts.
- NBA League Pass - Available to DISH, Dish Network and most digital cable providers.
- NFL Sunday Ticket - Exclusive to YouTube for residential and mobile accounts*, available to DirecTV for business accounts.
- NHL Center Ice - Available to DirecTV, DISH Network and most digital cable providers

^{*} NFL Sunday Ticket is exclusive to YouTube in the United States, but in other countries (most notably Canada) it is available more broadly, on several cable providers.

=== Internet ===
Internet sports packages are primarily marketed directly to consumers and not through cable or satellite providers. Current Internet television and radio subscription or pay-per-view services include:

- ESPN+ (also exclusive to DirecTV for business accounts)
- MLB.tv
  - MLB.com Gameday Audio
- MiLB.tv
- NFL+
- NHL Live (Canada, marketed and distributed by Rogers Communications through the 2025-26 NHL season); NHL package in the United States is part of ESPN+
- NBA League Pass Broadband
- Peacock, for NBC Sports events, including the Premier League and the Olympic Games
- UFC Fight Pass
- WNBA League Pass
- WWE Network; in the United States, is part of Peacock

Major League Baseball and the National Football League are the only professional sports leagues to black out local affiliates' internet radio feeds. Ironically, while the NFL charges money for radio feeds, it sells the Internet television rights to other networks that make those games available online for free, the opposite model of the other U.S cities major sports leagues.

== See also ==
- Regional sports network
