= List of defunct television networks in the United States =

This article lists defunct television networks in the United States.

== Distant locals/superstations ==
Name	Owner	Closure date	Notes
Foxnet	News Corporation	September 12, 2006	Launched on June 6, 1991. Served as the Fox station for smaller markets without an affiliate.
The WB 100+	Warner Bros. Entertainment/Tribune Broadcasting	September 17, 2006	Launched on September 21, 1998. Predecessor to The CW Plus.
WWOR EMI Service	Chris-Craft Industries/Advance Entertainment Corporation	December 31, 1996	Launched on January 1, 1990. National version of New York City's WWOR-TV.

== Entertainment ==
Name	Owner	Closure date	Notes
Xfinity 3D	Xfinity	December 16, 2014	
Telemeter	International Telemeter Corporation	1954	
Omni Broadcasting Network	OBN Holdings	2013	
VEU	Golden West Subscription Television, Inc. (Golden West Broadcasters) (1980–1983); IASTV (1983–1984)	September 30, 1984	
NuvoTV	Fuse Networks, LLC.	September 30, 2015	
National Empowerment Television	Paul Weyrich	2000	
3net	Discovery Communications/Sony/IMAX	August 12, 2014	Launched on February 13, 2011. 3D television channel.
AFN Spectrum	American Forces Network	2026	
America One	America One Television, Inc. (USFR Media Group) (1995–2003); VOTH Network, Inc. (USFR Media Group) (2003–2009); America One Television Network, Inc. (2009–2010); One Media Corp, Inc. (2010–2015); Center Post Networks, LLC (2015)	July 13, 2015	
Access Television Network	William Bernard	2000s	
American Independent Network	AIN Network, Inc.	2001	
Alpha Repertory Television Service	Hearst Corporation/ABC	February 1, 1984	Launched on April 12, 1981. Merged with The Entertainment Channel to form A&E.
Audience	DirecTV	May 22, 2020	Launched on November 25, 1999. Formerly known as Freeview and The 101 Network.
Burly Bear Network	Privately held (1994–1997); Broadway Video (1997–2002)	Sept. 2002	
Badger Television Network	Badger Television Network	August 8, 1958	
CBS Cable	CBS	December 17, 1982	
Chiller	NBCUniversal	December 31, 2017	Launched on March 1, 2007.
Channel America	Channel America Network Inc.	1996	Launched in 1988.
Colours TV	Black Star Communications	July 13, 2011	Launched on 1995
Cloo	NBCUniversal	February 1, 2017	Launched as Sleuth on January 1, 2006, replacing Trio.
Digi-TV	Digi-TV	August 3, 2022	
DuMont Television Network	DuMont Laboratories	August 6, 1956	Launched on June 28, 1942. The "forgotten network" of early local broadcast television. Fox is sometimes considered its spiritual successor.
El Rey Network	Robert Rodriguez/FactoryMade Ventures	December 31, 2020	Launched on December 15, 2013.
Fave TV	Paramount Skydance Corporation	February 2, 2026	
Fearnet	NBCUniversal	July 30, 2014	Launched on October 31, 2010.
Fox Reality Channel	Fox Entertainment Group	March 29, 2010	Launched on May 24, 2005. Replaced by Nat Geo Wild.
Funimation Channel	Funimation/Olympusat Inc.	December 31, 2015	Launched on September 29, 2005. Replaced by Toku, after Funimation's content deal with Olympusat expired. Relaunched as Crunchyroll Channel on October 11, 2023.
Hughes Television Network	HTN Communications	1990s	
Ha!	Viacom	April 1, 1991	Launched on April 1, 1990. Merged with The Comedy Channel to form CTV: The Comedy Network (renamed Comedy Central that June).
The Interactive Channel	Source Media		Launched its first trial in 1996, with Century Cable in Colorado Springs, using CableShare's VirtualModem software. Included headlines and classified ads from the Colorado Springs Gazette newspaper.
Jones Computer Network	Jones Intercable		Twelve-hour channel launched in 1994; predecessor to ZDTV.
Merit TV	Trinity Broadcasting Network	March 21, 2026	Launched on April 2, 2024.
Mojo HD	Comcast/Cox Communications/Time Warner Cable	December 1, 2008	Launched in September 2003. Formerly known as INHD.
n3D	DirecTV	June 25, 2012	
National Jewish Television Network	Joel Levitch	2000s	Basic cable channel broadcasting from New York City. Launched in the 1980s.
NTA Film Network	National Telefilm Associates/Twentieth Century Fox	November 1961	Launched in October 1956; An attempt to offer another U.S. general-interest commercial broadcast network, to join the three large commercial networks and the decentralized public-broadcast network National Educational Television; the VHF anchor station was transferred to NYC NET interests after the five-year experiment was abandoned. National Telefilm Associates continued as a program syndicator.
Network 1	Network Telephone Services		Channel which allowed viewer participation through 800 and 900 phone numbers.
Pennsylvania Public Television Network	Pennsylvania Public Television Network	2000s	
Phonevision	Zenith Radio Company	1969	
PlayCable	Mattel/General Instrument		Channel for downloading and playing Intellivision video games through an adapter; broadcast in the early 1980s.
Sega Channel	Sega	July 31, 1998	
Soapnet	Disney/ABC	December 31, 2013	Soap opera network specializing in airing soap operas. Launched on January 20, 2000. Replaced by Disney Junior on many television providers.
Star Television Network	Harry Handley, Walter Windsor, Cathy Bamberg, & John Tyler (1987-1989); Lang Communications (1989-1991)	January 14, 1991	
The Comedy Channel	Home Box Office, Inc.	April 1, 1991	Launched on November 15, 1989. Merged with Ha! to form CTV: The Comedy Network (renamed Comedy Central that June).
The Entertainment Channel	NBC	February 1, 1984	Merged with the Alpha Repertory Television Service to form A&E.
The Silent Network	Sheldon Altfeld/Kathleen Gold/Norm Crosby		Specialized channel aimed at deaf and hearing-impaired people; broadcast in the 1980s.
The WB	Warner Bros. Entertainment/Tribune Broadcasting	September 17, 2006	Launched on January 11, 1995. Merged with UPN to form The CW.
This TV	Allen Media Group	May 31, 2024	Launched on November 1, 2008.
Trio	NBCUniversal	January 1, 2006	Launched on June 1, 1994. Replaced by crime/mystery-focused Sleuth.
TV Scout		2016	
United Network	United Network, Inc.	June 1, 1967	
UPN	CBS Corporation	September 15, 2006	Launched on January 16, 1995. Merged with The WB to form The CW.
Urban America Television	Urban Television Network Corporation	May 1, 2006	
Varsity TV	Varsity Media Group, Inc.	January 15, 2009	Launched in 1999. High school student-produced programming.
Variety Television Network	Newport Television	January 2009	

== Children's/Family ==
Name	Owner	Closure date	Notes
Girlz Channel; Boyz Channel	Fox Family Worldwide	August 18, 2000	Cable spin-offs of the Fox Family Channel that aired programming aimed towards both demographics (male and female). Launched in November 1999, and were closed following slow distribution and low subscriber numbers of at least 100,000 each, and FFW's focus to restructuring the main network.
JUCE TV	Trinity Broadcasting Network	January 26, 2020	Launched on February 18, 2002. Formerly JCTV; replaced by Positiv.
AFN Family	American Forces Network	2026	
Kids & Teens TV	Sky Angel	January 31, 2019	Launched on January 4, 1999.
Light TV	Allen Media Group	January 15, 2021	Launched on December 22, 2016. Replaced by TheGrio.
Nickelodeon Games and Sports for Kids	MTV Networks (Viacom)	December 31, 2007	Launched on March 1, 1999. Replaced by 24-hour channel of The N, but Nick GaS continued to broadcast on Dish Network due to problematic unknown factors until April 23, 2009, when it was replaced by Cartoon Network's West Coast feed.
PBJ	Luken Communications	March 31, 2016	Launched on August 1, 2011. Digital subchannel broadcast network airing programs from the Classic Media library.
Qubo	The E.W. Scripps Company	February 28, 2021	Launched on September 9, 2006, as a programming block and on January 8, 2007, as a television channel.
Smile TV	Trinity Broadcasting Network	January 12, 2025	Launched on December 24, 2005. Formerly Smile of a Child; replaced by Yippee TV.
Toon Disney	The Walt Disney Company	February 13, 2009	Launched on April 18, 1998. Rebranded as Disney XD.
Universal Kids	NBCUniversal (Media Group/Cable Entertainment Group)	March 6, 2025	Launched on September 26, 2005. Formerly PBS Kids Sprout and Sprout.
Nick 2	MTV Networks (Viacom)	November 2018	

== LGBTQ ==
Name	Owner	Closure date	Notes
Gay Entertainment Television	Gay Entertainment Television Inc.		Founded in 1992.
Q Television Network	Triangle Multimedia	February 2006	Launched in August 2005.

== Lifestyle ==
Name	Owner	Closure date	Notes
Twist	Tegna Inc.	December 31, 2023	
Arts & Antiques Network	CYMA Productions		Launched in first quarter of 1996.
Discovery Health Channel	Discovery Communications	January 1, 2011	Launched on July 1, 1998. Replaced by Oprah Winfrey Network; merged with FitTV to create Discovery Fit & Health on February 1, 2011.
Doctor Television Channel	Doctor Television Channel	2019	
Esquire Network	NBCUniversal, Hearst Communications	June 28, 2017	Launched on October 1, 1998. Formerly known as Style Network, which focused on and mainly aimed at fashion.
Fashion and Design Television	Anthony Guccione		Launched in 1994.
G4	G4 Media (original); Comcast Spectacor (relaunch)	December 31, 2014 (original); November 18, 2022 (relaunch)	Launched on April 24, 2002. Relaunched on November 16, 2021.
G4techTV	G4 Media	February 15, 2005	
Halogen TV	The Inspiration Networks	August 1, 2013	Launched on October 24, 2009. Merged with the Documentary Channel into Pivot.
Lime TV	Gaia, Inc.	February 25, 2007	Formerly known as Wisdom Television.
Plum TV	Joseph Varet, Morgan Hertzan	May 2013	
Retirement Living TV	Retirement Living TV, LLC	December 31, 2017	Launched on September 5, 2006. Replaced by Newsy.
TechTV	Vulcan Inc.	May 28, 2004	Launched on May 11, 1998, as ZDTV. Merged with G4.
Wedding Central	Rainbow Media	July 1, 2011	Launched on August 18, 2009. Spinoff channel of We TV.

== Music ==
Name	Owner	Closure date	Notes
Bohemia Visual Music	Bohemia Visual Music LLC	March 29, 2010	
Americana Television Network	Americana Television Network Inc.	c. 1994	Country, blues, bluegrass, jazz and gospel music videos. Founded by Stanley Hitchcock in 1992; sold to TCI after two years, which resulted in its shutdown.
The Box	MTV Networks	January 1, 2001	Launched in 1985. Formerly known as the Video Jukebox Network; replaced by MTV2.
Cable Music Channel	Turner Broadcasting	November 30, 1984	Launched in 1984 by Ted Turner in an attempt to compete with MTV; unlike that channel, it had no VJs. It was short lived.
Classic Music Channel	Classical Broadcasting Company		
The Gospel Network			
Hit Video USA			1980s video channel based out of Texas, aired on some broadcast channels during overnight periods.
International Music Feed	Universal Music Group	March 31, 2008	Launched on January 20, 2005. Aired music videos from various artists from around the world; purchased and shut down by Hubbard Broadcasting in 2008 to expand distribution for Ovation TV.
m Channel			Aired syndicated music videos, television shows, movies and news. The channel closed under decision of the owner/creator of the network.
MOR Music TV		August 31, 1997	Launched on September 1, 1992. Channel which aired music videos and performances in conjunction with selling albums.
MTVX	MTV Networks	May 1, 2002	Launched on August 1, 1998. Replaced by MTV Jams (later renamed BET Jams).
NOYZ	Bullfrog Media	January 10, 2008	Launched in January 2006. Closed due to parent company's bankruptcy.
Retro Jams	Equity Media Holdings Corporation	August 2009	
TheCoolTV	Cool Music Network, LLC	August 1, 2017	Launched in March 2009. Converted to online-only streaming service after shutdown.
The Tube Music Network	The Tube Media Corp.	October 1, 2007	Launched in June 2005.
VH1 MegaHits	MTV Networks	June 30, 2005	Launched on May 1, 2002. Replaced by LGBT-aimed Logo TV.
Z Music Television	Gaylord Entertainment Company	2000	Launched on March 1, 1993. Contemporary Christian music video channel; shared channel space with BET in some areas.

== News and information ==
Name	Owner	Closure date	Notes
The Weather Cast	WeatherNation/Dish Network	May 24, 2010	
Weatherscan	Allen Media Group	December 12, 2022	
CheddarU	Viacom Media Networks (2002–2018); Cheddar (2018–)	202?	
UPI Newstime	United Press International	1981	
Medical News Network	Whittle Communications	1994	
CNN Airport	Turner Broadcasting System (Time Warner)	March 31, 2021	
CNN Checkout Channel	Turner Broadcasting System (Time Warner)	March 31, 1993	
Black News Channel	Allen Media Group	August 1, 2022	
ABC News Now	Disney/ABC	October 28, 2013	Launched on July 26, 2004. Replaced by Fusion.
America's Talking	NBCUniversal	July 15, 1996	Launched on July 4, 1994. Replaced by MSNBC.
Al Jazeera America	Al Jazeera Media Network	April 12, 2016	Launched on August 20, 2013.
All News Channel	CONUS Communications (Viacom/Hubbard Broadcasting)	September 30, 2002	Launched on January 1, 1989. Aired on USSB and later DirecTV; its programming was carried by many over-the-air television stations during the late night hours.
America's Voice	Performance One Media, LLC		Originally National Empowerment Television and eventually became The Renaissance Network. Relaunched as a streaming network named Real America's Voice in 2018.
CBS Telenoticias	CBS	September 2000	Rebranded from Telenoticias on January 1, 1997. Formerly known as Telenoticias; replaced by Telemundo Internacional.
DoD News Channel	Defense Media Activity (United States Department of Defense)	April 17, 2015	Launched on May 17, 2004. Formerly known as Pentagon Channel.
CNNfn	Turner Broadcasting System (Time Warner)	December 15, 2004	Launched on December 29, 1995. A few cable systems switched the channel space to CNN International after discontinuation.
Current TV	Al Gore/Joel Hyatt	August 20, 2013	Launched on August 1, 2005. Replaced by Al Jazeera America.
Documentary Channel	Participant Media	August 1, 2013	Launched on January 26, 2006. Merged with Halogen TV into Pivot.
Financial News Network	Rodney Buchser, Dr. Glen H. Taylor and Merrill Lynch (1981–1991); CNBC (1991)	May 21, 1991	
Fusion	Fusion Media Group (Univision Communications)	December 31, 2021	Launched on October 28, 2013. Replaced ABC News Now.
Link TV	Public Media Group of Southern California	November 1, 2023	Launched on December 15, 1999.
NBC Weather Plus	NBC	December 31, 2008	Launched on November 15, 2004. Distributed via the digital subchannels of NBC affiliates and digital cable. Closed after NBC's purchase of an interest in The Weather Channel.
NewsTalk Television	Multimedia, Inc.	1995	Existed from 1994 to 1995; formerly known as the Talk Channel.
NewsNet	Bridge News, LLC	August 2, 2024	
Newsworld International	Canadian Broadcasting Corporation/USA Broadcasting	July 31, 2005	Launched on June 1, 1994. Replaced by Current TV.
Pivot	Participant Media	October 31, 2016	
RT America	(ANO) TV-Novosti	March 3, 2022	Launched in February 2010. United States cut in channel of RT; shut down as a result of sanctions on Russia over their invasion of Ukraine.
Satellite News Channel	ABC/Group W	October 27, 1983	Launched on June 21, 1982. Eventually replaced by CNN Headline News.
Tempo Television	Tempo Enterprises	April 17, 1989	Formerly Satellite Program Network; replaced by CNBC.

=== Regional news ===
Name	Location	Owner	Closure date	Notes
Ocean State Networks		WJAR	2024	
The California Channel	Sacramento, California		October 15, 2019	Launched on February 4, 1991.
Chicagoland Television	Chicago, Illinois	Nexstar Media Group	December 31, 2019	Launched on January 1, 1993. Originally owned by Tribune Broadcasting before that company was acquired by Nexstar in 2019.
Local News on Cable	Norfolk, Virginia	Belo Corporation	December 31, 2010	Launched on February 24, 1997. Also called LNC5
FiOS1; FiOS1 New Jersey; FiOS1 Long Island; FiOS1 Lower Hudson Valley	New York metropolitan area	Verizon Communications	November 13, 2019	Launched on June 22, 2009, for Long Island and New Jersey and on May 28, 2014, for the Lower Hudson Valley. News was produced by RNN.
Southern Arizona News Network	Tucson, Arizona	Cox Communications/KVOA Communications, Inc.	March 31, 2010	Launched on September 27, 1953.
Northwest Cable News	Pacific Northwest	Tegna	January 6, 2017	Launched on December 18, 1995. Used news resources from co-owned Tegna outlets KING-TV, KREM, KGW and KTVB.
Texas Cable News	Texas	Gannett Company	May 1, 2015	Launched on January 1, 1999.
OC Channel	California	PBS	May 2017	

== Pay-per-view ==
Name	Owner	Closure date	Notes
BET Action	BET (later TVN Entertainment)		Di-function channel, originally known as Action Pay-Per-View.
Adam & Eve Channel	Adam & Eve Communications Inc.		Adult pay-per-view and home shopping
AdultVision	Playboy Enterprises		Adult pay-per-view
American Exxxtasy	Home Dish Satellite Network Inc.	1990	Adult pay-per-view
Cable Video Store	American Cablesystems (original), Graff Pay-Per-View (second)	May 1997	Launched October 1, 1986
Guest Cinema			Adult pay-per-view
Hot Choice	In Demand	July 31, 2025	Adult pay-per-view. Launched in 1988.
INHD2	Comcast/Cox Communications/Time Warner Cable	January 1, 2007	Former companion network to INHD
People's Choice			Pay-per-view
Request TV	Liberty Media and 20th Century Fox	June 30, 1998	Launched in November 1985. Also operated a Spanish-language pay-per-view channel, Request En Español
Rendezvous			Adult pay-per-view
Sneak Prevue	Prevue Networks (United Video Satellite Group) (1991–1999); Gemstar-TV Guide International (1999–2002)	April 2002	
Spectradyne			Adult pay-per-view in major hotel chains
StarDust Theatre	Home Dish Satellite Network Inc.		
Tuxxedo Network	Home Dish Satellite Network Inc.		Adult pay-per-view

== Movies ==
Name	Owner	Closure date	Notes
Theater Television Network		1953	
Prime Time Entertainment Network	Warner Bros. Domestic Television Distribution; BHC Communications	October 27, 1997	
Paramount Television Network	Paramount Pictures	1956	
Monsters HD	Voom HD Networks	January 20, 2009	
AFN Movie	American Forces Network	2026	
The B-Movie Channel			
Cable Theater		1980s	Aired from late 1970s to early 1980s.
Encore Plus	Liberty Starz	January 1, 1997	Replaced by Plex: Encore 1 (eventually changed to MoviePlex).
Festival	HBO	December 31, 1988	Launched on April 1, 1986. 1980s premium channel from HBO.
Take 2	HBO	January 31, 1981	Launched on April 1, 1979. 1970s premium channel from HBO.
INTRO Television	Liberty Starz	January 1, 1997	Formerly known as TV! Network; replaced by Plex: Encore 1 (eventually changed to MoviePlex).
Home Theater Network		January 31, 1987	Launched on September 1, 1978. Premium movies
HBO Family	HBO	August 15, 2025	Launched on 1996
MGM HD	Metro-Goldwyn-Mayer	October 31, 2022	Launched on October 10, 2007.
Movie Mania		October 2006	Formerly B-Mania!, B-Movie channel.
MovieMax	Cinemax	August 15, 2025	Launched on 2001
MovieVision			Premium movies
ONTV	National Subscription Television	June 30, 1985	Also aired sports and events.
OuterMax	Cinemax	August 15, 2025	Launched on 2001
Preview	Time, Inc.	1986	Launched in 1980.
PRISM	Spectacor	October 1, 1997	Launched on September 1, 1976. 24-hour premium cable television channel intended for cable customers in the Philadelphia, Pennsylvania metropolitan area. Channel infrastructure has been used for NBC Sports Philadelphia.
SelecTV	Starion Entertainment	March 31, 1989	Launched on July 23, 1978.
Showtime Beyond	ViacomCBS Domestic Media Networks	July 15, 2020	Launched in September 1999. Replaced by SHO×BET, but aimed at Black audience.
Spectrum	United Cable	October 6, 1985	Launched on September 29, 1981.
Spotlight	Times Mirror	February 1, 1984	Launched on May 28, 1981. Premium movies
Star	Satellite Television & Associated Resources	February 12, 1983	Launched in 1981. Formerly known as BEST and StarCase; replaced by Preview
Star TV		1984	San Francisco over-the-air channel similar to ONTV via KTSF-TV. Named Super Time during the late 1970s and Star TV in the early 1980s.
Super TV	Subscription TV of Greater Washington, Inc.	March 31, 1986	Launched on November 1, 1981.
The Works	MGM Television (Metro-Goldwyn-Mayer)	February 28, 2017	
ThrillerMax	Cinemax	August 15, 2025	Launched on 1998
Z Channel	American Spectacor	June 29, 1989	Launched in 1974.
Wometco Home Theater	Wometco Enterprises	1986	Subscription service operating offering movies, live sports and entertainment specials through over-the-air broadcast affiliates including flagship station WTVG/WWHT licensed to Newark, New Jersey from 1977 to 1986.

== Public-interest/educational ==
Name	Owner	Closure date	Notes
National College Television	Brad Siegel Marilyn Freeman	1990	
Moov HD	Voom HD Networks	January 1, 2004	
LAB HD	Voom HD Networks	2009	
Discovery People	CBS Corporation (1997-1999); Discovery Communications (1999-2000)	2000	
Florida Knowledge Network	Florida Department of Education	July 1, 2011	
Knowledge TV	Jones International	2000	Launched on November 15, 1987. Closed several months after being sold to Discovery Communications.
MHz Worldview	MHz Networks	March 1, 2020	Launched on October 19, 2005.
NASA TV	NASA	August 28, 2024	Launched in 1980, and known as NASA Select until 1994.
National Educational Television	Ford Foundation/Corporation for Public Broadcasting	October 4, 1970	Launched on May 16, 1954. Predecessor to PBS.
PBS YOU ("YOU" being an acronym for "Your Own University")	PBS	January 9, 2006	Launched on January 15, 2000. Service ended in January 2006; most stations replaced service with American Public Television's Create network.
ResearchChannel	University of Washington	August 31, 2010	Launched in November 1996.
ThinkBright	WNED-TV	2011	Launched in 2001.
TrueReal	E. W. Scripps Company	March 27, 2023	
UniversityHouse	Northern Arizona University		Telecourses from Northern Arizona University; was carried on Dish Network's "Public Interest" tier.

== Religion ==
Name	Owner	Closure date	Notes
National Christian Network	Ray A. Kassis	1986	
Angel One	Sky Angel	January 31, 2019	
Angel Two	Sky Angel	January 31, 2019	
Bridges TV		March 15, 2012	Launched on November 15, 2004. Muslim television network.
BYU Television International	Brigham Young University	June 30, 2018	
i-Life TV	The Inspiration Networks	October 24, 2009	Replaced by Halogen TV.
PTL Satellite Network	Jim and Tammy Faye Bakker	1989	Launched in 1974. Closed following a sex and embezzlement scandal that resulted in Jim Bakker being sentenced to prison. Relaunched as PTL Television Network in 2015.
The Worship Network	The Christian Network, Inc.	2013	Launched in 1992. Aired on the digital subchannels of Ion Media Networks-owned stations until 2010.
American Christian Television System	Southern Baptist Convention	2003	

== Shopping ==
Name	Owner	Closure date	Notes
America's Store	IAC/InterActiveCorp	April 7, 2007	Launched in 1988.
Advertising Television	Web Broadcasting Systems Inc.		
BET-Home Shopping Network	BET Holdings, Inc. / Home Shopping Network		
Black Shopping Network			Black-owned shopping network.
Cable Value Network	Tele-Communications Inc.	1989	Merged with QVC.
Consumer Resource Network	Seventh Medium		
Cupid Network Television	Capital Distribution		Adult home shopping
Gems TV	Gems TV Holdings Limited	April 15, 2010	
Gun TV	Social Responsibility Network, LLC	January 9, 2017	
Global Shopping Network			
Q2	QVC	1996	Spinoff of QVC. Not to be confused with QVC2, another QVC spinoff which was launched in 2013, as QVC Plus.
Resort & Residence TV		March 28, 2011	Aired on DirecTV and Dish Network.
Shop at Home Network	Jewelry Television	March 8, 2008	Launched in 1987.
ShopHQ	iMedia Brands Inc.	April 17, 2025	Formerly known as ValueVision, ShopNBC, Evine and Evine Live
Shop Television Network	JCPenney and Shop Television Network, Ltd.	1991	Was also known as JCPenney Television Shopping Channel.
TV Car Showroom	Hachette Filipacchi Magazines		
ViaTV Network	RSTV Inc.		

== Sports ==
Name	Owner	Closure date	Notes
Tuff TV	Tuff TV, Inc.	August 26, 2018	
Special Events Television Network	Jim Wiglesworth	1988	
One World Sports	One Media Corporation	March 16, 2017	
Oregon Sports Properties	Learfield	2000s	
American Sports Network	Sinclair Broadcast Group	August 21, 2017	
Back9Network	Jamie Bosworth Reid Gorman	2015	
AFN Sports 2	American Forces Network	2026	
CNN/Sports Illustrated	Turner Broadcasting System (Time Warner)	May 15, 2002	Launched on December 12, 1996.
Lorimar Sports Network	Lorimar Productions (1983–1985); Lorimar-Telepictures (1985–1986)	March 1986	
ESPN 3D	ESPN Inc.	September 30, 2013	Launched on June 11, 2010. 3D television channel.
ESPN College Extra	ESPN Inc.	August 15, 2023	Launched on September 5, 2015. Replaced ESPN Full Court and ESPN GamePlan.
ESPN Goal Line & Bases Loaded	ESPN Inc.	June 30, 2020	Launched on September 4, 2010.
ESPN Full Court	ESPN Inc.	August 28, 2015	Launched on November 1, 2007. Replaced by ESPN College Extra.
ESPN GamePlan	ESPN Inc.	August 28, 2015	Launched on September 5, 1992. Replaced by ESPN College Extra.
ESPN Classic	ESPN Inc.	December 31, 2021	
The Football Network	The Football Network, Inc.	December 8, 2003	Launched earlier in 2003.
Fox Soccer	21st Century Fox	September 2, 2013	Launched on November 1, 1997. Formerly known as Fox Sports World; replaced by FXX.
Fuel TV	21st Century Fox	August 17, 2013	Launched on July 1, 2003.
Men's Outdoor and Recreation			
Mizlou Television Network	Mizlou Communications	1991	
NASCAR Hot Pass	NASCAR / DirecTV	2013	Launched in 2007. Aired on DirecTV.
Olympic Channel	NBCUniversal, United States Olympic Committee and NBC Sports Group	September 30, 2022	Launched on July 31, 2003. Formerly Bravo HD+ and Universal HD.
SEC TV	ESPN Inc.	March 14, 2014	
Stadium College Sports	Diamond Sports Group	December 31, 2023	Launched in 2001. Formerly known as Fox College Sports.
Speed	21st Century Fox	August 17, 2013	Launched on December 31, 1995. Formerly known as Speedvision; replaced by Fox Sports 1.
Sports News Highlights	Bridge Media Networks	August 2, 2024	
Sports News Network	Mizlou Communications	December 17, 1990	Launched in February 1990.
Trax	Networks Development Corporation		
TVS Television Network	Eddie Einhorn (1968–1973); Corinthian Broadcasting Corporation (1973–1993; became a subsidiary of Dun & Bradstreet in 1969)	August 29, 1993	
Universal Sports	InterMedia Partners and NBCUniversal	November 16, 2015	Launched in 2006. Formerly World Championship Sports Network; programming moved to Universal HD (later Olympic Channel).
Water Channel	MCE Television Networks Inc.	2009	Launched on September 21, 2006.
Web Sports Net	Web Broadcasting Systems Inc.		Text-based sports news service.
NFL Sunday Ticket	National Football League	1994	Currently owned by YouTube TV.
NFL Sunday Ticket Fantasy Zone	National Football League	2005	Exclusive to YouTube TV.
NFL Sunday Ticket Multiview Fan	National Football League	2005	Exclusive to YouTube TV.
NFL Sunday Ticket RedZone	National Football League	2005	Exclusive to YouTube TV.
NewSport	Rainbow Programming Holdings (Cablevision; NBC; Liberty Media)	July 9, 1997	

=== Regional sports ===
Name	Location	Owner	Closure date	Notes
Big 12 Network		ESPN, Inc.	March 15, 2014	
Marlins Television Network		Bruce Sherman	2000s	
Bally Sports Arizona	Arizona	Diamond Sports Group	October 21, 2023	Launched on September 7, 1996. Formerly known as Fox Sports Arizona.
Bally Sports Great Lakes	Upper Midwest	Main Street Sports Group	March 1, 2025	Formerly SportsTime Ohio. Later became known as FanDuel Sports Network Great Lakes. Launched on March 12, 2006.
Bally Sports San Diego	San Diego, California	Diamond Sports Group	April 2024	Launched on March 17, 2012. Originally Fox Sports San Diego, a subfeed of Bally Sports SoCal
Comcast/Charter Sports Southeast	Southern United States	NBCUniversal and Charter Communications	June 1, 2014	Launched on September 3, 1999.
Comcast Entertainment Television	Colorado/Utah	NBCUniversal	June 2018	Launched on September 1, 2004.
Comcast Network	East Coast	NBCUniversal	October 2, 2017	Launched on December 1, 1996. Replaced by NBC Sports Philadelphia+ and NBC Sports Washington+.
Cox Sports Television	Gulf South	Cox Communications	October 31, 2021	Launched on October 28, 2002.
Empire Sports Network	Upstate New York	Adelphia Cable	March 7, 2005	Launched on December 31, 1990.
FanDuel Sports Network Detroit	Michigan	Main Street Sports Group	September 30, 2026	Launched on September 17, 1997. Known as Fox Sports Detroit (1997-1999, 2008-2021), Fox Sports Net Detroit (1999-2004), FSN Detroit (2004-2008), and Bally Sports Detroit (2021-2024).
FanDuel Sports Network Florida	Florida	Main Street Sports Group	September 30, 2026	Launched on December 29, 1987. Known as SportsChannel Florida (1987-2000), Fox Sports Net Florida (2000-2004), FSN Florida (2004-2008), Fox Sports Florida (2008-2021), and Bally Sports Florida (2021-2024).
FanDuel Sports Network Indiana	Indiana	Main Street Sports Group	September 30, 2026	Launched on November 1, 2006. Known as FSN Indiana (2006-2008), Fox Sports Indiana (2008-2021), and Bally Sports Indiana (2021-2024).
FanDuel Sports Network Kansas City	Kansas	Main Street Sports Group	September 30, 2026	Launched on March 31, 2008. Known as Fox Sports Kansas City (2008-2021) and Bally Sports Kansas City (2021-2024).
FanDuel Sports Network Midwest	Missouri	Main Street Sports Group	September 30, 2026	Launched in September 1989. Known as Prime Sports Midwest (1989-1996), Fox Sports Midwest (1996-1999, 2008-2021), Fox Sports Net Midwest (1999-2004), FSN Midwest (2004-2008), and Bally Sports Midwest (2021-2024).
FanDuel Sports Network North	Minnesota	Main Street Sports Group	September 30, 2026	Launched on March 1, 1989. Known as Midwest Sports Channel (1989-2001), Fox Sports Net North (2001-2004), FSN North (2004-2008), Fox Sports North (2008-2021), and Bally Sports North (2021-2024).
FanDuel Sports Network Ohio	Ohio	Main Street Sports Group	September 30, 2026	Launched on February 9, 1989. Known as SportsChannel Ohio (1989-1998), Fox Sports Ohio (1998-1999, 2008-2021, Fox Sports Net Ohio (1999-2004), FSN Ohio (2004-2008), and Bally Sports Ohio (2021-2024).
FanDuel Sports Network Oklahoma	Oklahoma	Main Street Sports Group	September 30, 2026	Launched on October 29, 2008. Known as Fox Sports Oklahoma (2008-2021) and Bally Sports Oklahoma (2021-2024).
FanDuel Sports Network SoCal	California	Main Street Sports Group	September 30, 2026	Launched on January 27, 1997. Known as Fox Sports West 2 (1997-1999), Fox Sports Net West 2 (1999-2004), FSN West 2 (2004-2006), Prime Ticket (2006-2021), and Bally Sports SoCal (2021-2024).
FanDuel Sports Network South	Georgia	Main Street Sports Group	September 30, 2026	Launched on August 29, 1990. Known as SportSouth (1990-1997), Fox Sports South (1997-1999, 2012-2021), Fox Sports Net South (1999-2004), FSN South (2004-2008), FS South (2008-2012), and Bally Sports South (2021-2024).
FanDuel Sports Network Southeast	Georgia	Main Street Sports Group	September 30, 2026	Launched on October 13, 2006. Known as SportSouth (2006-2015), Fox Sports Southeast (2015-2021), and Bally Sports Southeast (2021-2024).
FanDuel Sports Network Southwest	Texas	Main Street Sports Group	September 30, 2026	Launched on January 4, 1983. Known as Home Sports Entertainment (1983-1995), Prime Sports Southwest (1995-1996), Fox Sports Southwest (1996-2000, 2008-2021), Fox Sports Net Southwest (2000-2004), FSN Southwest (2004-2008), and Bally Sports Southwest (2021-2024).
FanDuel Sports Network Sun	Florida	Main Street Sports Group	September 30, 2026	Launched on March 4, 1988. Known as Sunshine Network (1988-2005), Sun Sports (2005-2015), Fox Sports Sun (2015-2021), and Bally Sports Sun (2021-2024).
FanDuel Sports Network Wisconsin	Wisconsin	Main Street Sports Group	September 30, 2026	Launched on April 1, 2007. Known as FSN Wisconsin (2007-2012), Fox Sports Wisconsin (2012-2021), and Bally Sports Wisconsin (2021-2024).
Fox Sports Net Chicago	Chicago, Illinois	News Corporation/Cablevision	June 23, 2006	Launched in 1998. Replaced by Comcast SportsNet Chicago (now NBC Sports Chicago).
Fox Sports Houston	Houston, Texas	News Corporation/Cablevision	October 5, 2012	Launched in 2009. Replaced by Comcast SportsNet Houston (now Space City Home Network).
Fox Sports Carolinas	North/South Carolina	News Corporation/Cablevision	March 31, 2021	Launched on October 31, 2008.
Fox Sports Tennessee	Tennessee	News Corporation/Cablevision	March 31, 2021	Launched on October 31, 2008.
Hawkvision	Chicago	Wirtz Corporation	1995	
Longhorn Network	Texas	University of Texas at Austin	June 30, 2024	Launched on August 26, 2011.
MountainWest Sports Network	Western United States	Mountain West Conference (MWC), CBS Corporation, Comcast	May 31, 2012	Launched on September 1, 2006. Aired Mountain West Conference sports.
NBC Sports Chicago	Upper Midwest	NBC Sports Group	September 30, 2024	Launched October 1, 2004. Formerly CSN Chicago until 2017.
NBC Sports Northwest	Pacific Northwest	NBC Sports Group	September 30, 2021	Launched on November 1, 2007. Formerly known as Comcast SportsNet Northwest.
Pac-12 Network	Western United States	Pac-12 Conference	July 1, 2024	Launched on August 15, 2012.
Prime Sports		Liberty Media	November 1, 1996	Launched on October 19, 1985. Regional sports network; replaced by Fox Sports Net.
Root Sports Northwest	Pacific Northwest	Seattle Mariners	January 1, 2026	Launched on November 5, 1988. Formerly known as Northwest Cable Sports, Prime Sports Northwest, Fox Sports Northwest, Fox Sports Net Northwest, FSN Northwest and FS Northwest. Also known as Root Sports.
Spectrum Sports (New York)	Upstate New York	Charter Communications	October 5, 2017	Launched in 2003.
Spectrum Sports (Carolinas)	North/South Carolina	Charter Communications	June 2017	Launched in August 2014.
Spectrum Sports (Florida)	Florida	Charter Communications	December 16, 2017	Launched in 2004.
Spectrum Sports (Ohio)	Ohio	Charter Communications	January 2019	Launched in September 1998.
Spectrum Sports (Wisconsin)	Wisconsin	Charter Communications	December 31, 2018	Launched in February 2007.
Spectrum Sports (Texas)	Texas	Charter Communications	June 2017	Launched in 2010.
Sports Time	Midwestern United States	Anheuser-Busch	March 31, 1985	Launched on April 2, 1984. St. Louis and Midwest cable sports station.
SportsChannel		Cablevision/NBC	January 1998	Launched in 1979. Regional sports network; merged with Fox Sports Net.
SportsNet Rocky Mountain	Rocky Mountains	Warner Bros. Discovery	October 21, 2023	Launched on November 15, 1988. Formerly known as AT&T SportsNet Rocky Mountain.
Turner South	Southeastern United States	Turner Broadcasting System (Time Warner)	October 13, 2006	Launched on October 1, 1999. Purchased by Fox Cable Networks and relaunched as SportSouth.
University of North Dakota Sports Network	North Dakota/Minnesota/South Dakota	University of North Dakota/WDAZ-TV/Midcontinent Communications	March 2012	Launched in 2002. Formerly known as Fighting Sioux Sports Network (FSSN).
Victory Sports One	Minneapolis-Saint Paul, Minnesota	Carl Pohlad	May 8, 2004	Launched on October 31, 2003. Aired Minnesota Twins baseball games.

== Spanish ==
Name	Owner	Closure date	Notes
VH1 Uno	MTV Networks	February 2, 2008	
VasalloVision	Carlos Vasallo and Miguel Banojian	August 13, 2012	
América CV	América CV Network, LLC	2015	
Azteca América	Innovate Corp.	December 31, 2022	Launched on July 28, 2001. Azteca name and branding was licensed from TV Azteca and Grupo Salinas.
Azteca México	Azteca International Corporation	October 4, 2016	
Hispanic Television Network	Hispanic Television Network, Inc.	July 10, 2003	
InfoMás	Bright House Networks (2011-2016); Charter Communications (2016-2017)	November 20, 2017	
La Familia Cosmovision	The Inspiration Networks	December 31, 2014	Launched in 1978.
La Familia Network		October 4, 2015	Launched in 1994, and was available on Time Warner Cable.
LAT TV	Latin America Broadcasting	May 20, 2008	
GOL TV	Gol TV, Inc.	December 31, 2025	Launched on February 1, 2003.
MundoMax	RCN Televisión	November 30, 2016	Launched on February 25, 2004. Formerly known as MundoFox as a joint venture with Fox International Channels; rebranded as MundoMax in 2015.
NuvoTV	Fuse Media	September 30, 2015	Launched on August 13, 2012. Formerly Sí TV; merged with Fuse, with its channel space being replaced by FM.
SOI TV	Eligio Cedeño	January 2013	
TuVisión	Pappas Telecasting	March 2009	

== Ethnic ==
=== African-American/Black ===
Name	Owner	Closure date	Notes
Black Family Channel		April 30, 2007	Launched in 1999. Formerly MBC Network; subscriber base sold to Gospel Music Channel after shutdown.
Caribbean Satellite Network			
New Urban Entertainment Television (NUE-TV)	Space Station TeleVision	May 2001/October 2002	
The MBC Movie Network	Minority Broadcasting Corp.		
World African Network			

=== Asian ===
Name	Owner	Closure date	Notes
AZN Television	Comcast	April 9, 2008	Launched in 1990. Formerly International Channel; first nationwide television cable channel dedicated to Asian Americans.
ImaginAsian	ImaginAsian Entertainment, Inc	2011	
MTV Chi	Viacom Media Networks	April 30, 2007	Launched on December 6, 2005. An MTV World network dedicated to Chinese-American audiences.
MTV Desi	Viacom Media Networks	April 30, 2007	Launched in July 2005. An MTV World network dedicated to South Asian-American audiences.
MTV K	Viacom Media Networks	April 30, 2007	Launched on June 27, 2006. An MTV World network dedicated to Korean-American audiences.
SinoVision	Asian Culture and Media Group	Sep 1, 2024	
TV Japan	NHK	March 31, 2024	Launched on April 1, 1991. A 24-hour Japanese language channel targeted toward the North American Japanese diaspora.
STV-US	Naem Nizam	15 March 2007	

=== German ===
Name	Owner	Closure date	Notes
ChannelD		2002	First German private television satellite channel launched in 2001.
Dolphin-TV	Dolphin-TV German Television Inc.	2007	German private television satellite channel launched in 2006.
GermanTV	Deutsche Welle TV, ARD & ZDF (German Public Broadcasters)	2005	Satellite channel launched in 2001.

=== Other European ===
Name	Owner	Closure date	Notes
Telefrance USA	Gaumont and SOFIRAD	September 30, 1983	Channel broadcasting French-language programming, especially high-profile films. Launched in 1976 in New York, it became a national channel after Gaumont's acquisition; the company was facing financial issues in the early 1980s and had to close unsuccessful units.
Scandinavian Channel	Scandinavian Channel Inc.	May 1, 2001	Short-lived channel airing programs from the Scandinavian public broadcasters.

== High-definition ==
Name	Owner	Closure date	Notes
Voom HD Networks	Rainbow Media (Cablevision)	January 20, 2009	Launched on July 17, 2003. Suite of 15 high-definition networks.

== Network rebrands ==
Name	Owner	Notes
America's Collectibles Network	Multimedia Commerce Group Inc.	Rebranded as Jewelry Television by October 15, 1993.
Beauty iQ	Qurate Retail Group	Rebranded as QVC3 on April 1, 2019.
BET Jazz	BET Networks (Viacom)	Renamed BET J, Centric, and BET Her, which is mainly aimed at Black women.
The Biography Channel	A&E Networks	Renamed Bio in July 2007 and then rebranded to FYI on July 7, 2014.
Cable Health Club	Discovery Inc.	Rebranded America's Health Network in 1996, The Health Network in 1999, FitTV in 2004, then Discovery Fit & Health on February 1, 2011.
CBN Satellite Service	Walt Disney Television	Launched on April 29, 1977. Relaunched to The Family Channel in 1990, Fox Family Channel in 1998, ABC Family on November 10, 2001, then Freeform on January 12, 2016.
The Church Channel	Trinity Broadcasting Network	Renamed Hillsong Channel on June 1, 2016, and then TBN Inspire on January 1, 2022.
CNN 2	WarnerMedia News & Sports (WarnerMedia)	Rebranded as CNN Headline News in January 1983, and then simply HLN on June 17, 2007.
Court TV	WarnerMedia News & Sports (WarnerMedia)	Launched on July 1, 1991. Rebranded as TruTV on January 1, 2008. Court TV was relaunched as a digital broadcast network on May 8, 2019.
Discovery Civilization Network	Discovery Inc.	First rebranded Discovery Civilization Channel, then Discovery Times, and Investigation Discovery.
Discovery Health Channel	Discovery Inc.	Launched on July 1, 1998. Merged with FitTV to create Discovery Fit & Health on February 1, 2011, with the channel space replaced by OWN on January 1, 2011.
Discovery HD Theater	Discovery Inc.	Renamed HD Theater on September 22, 2007, rebranded Velocity on October 4, 2011, then Motor Trend on November 23, 2018, and Discovery Turbo in 2026.
Discovery Kids	Discovery Inc.	Relaunched The Hub on October 10, 2010, renamed Hub Network in 2013, and then rebranded Discovery Family on October 13, 2014.
Discovery Travel and Living	Discovery Inc.	Rebranded Discovery Home and Leisure in 1998, then Discovery Home in 2004, Planet Green in 2008, and then Destination America on May 26, 2012.
Discovery Wings	Discovery Inc.	Rebranded Military Channel on January 10, 2005, then American Heroes Channel on March 3, 2014.
DIY Network	Discovery Inc.	Relaunched Magnolia Network on January 5, 2022.
Encore	Starz Inc.	Renamed Starz Encore on April 5, 2016.
Fine Living Network	Discovery Inc.	Launched on August 21, 2002. Shut down on May 31, 2010, replaced by Cooking Channel.
Fox Movie Channel	News Corp.	Rebranded FXM on January 1, 2012.
Fox Reality Channel	News Corp.	Launched on May 24, 2005. Shut down on March 29, 2010, replaced by Nat Geo Wild.
Fox Sports en Español	Fox Corporation	Relaunched Fox Deportes on October 1, 2010.
Funimation Channel	Funimation/Olympusat Inc.	Replaced by Toku on December 31, 2015. Relaunched as Crunchyroll Channel on October 11, 2023.
Gospel Music Channel	InterMedia Partners	Renamed GMC TV in Fall 2010 and then Up on June 1, 2013.
Hallmark Movie Channel	Crown Media Holdings (Hallmark Cards)	Rebranded as Hallmark Movies & Mysteries on September 29, 2014, and then Hallmark Mystery.
HDNet	HDNet Inc.	Rebranded as AXS TV on July 2, 2012.
HRTV	Betfair	Rebranded as TVG2 on October 28, 2015, and then FanDuel Racing in September 2022.
The Inspiration Network	The Inspiration Networks	Renamed INSP in October 2010.
The Jewelry Channel	Vaibhav Global	Rebranded Liquidation Channel in 2009 and then renamed Shop LC on January 9, 2017.
Movietime	NBCUniversal	Rebranded as E! in 1991.
MHD	Viacom	Rebranded as Palladia on September 1, 2008, and then renamed MTV Live on February 1, 2016.
MTV Hits	Viacom	Renamed NickMusic on September 9, 2016.
MuchMusic USA	CHUM Limited and Rainbow Media	Rebranded Fuse on May 19, 2003.
Mun2	NBCUniversal	Rebranded NBC Universo on February 1, 2015.
National College Sports Network	CBS Corporation	Rebranded to CSTV in 2003, then CBS College Sports Network in 2008, and then CBS Sports Network on April 4, 2011.
The 90's Channel	Public Communicators, Inc.	Replaced by Free Speech TV in 1995
Noggin	Viacom	Originally co-owned by Sesame Workshop (formerly CTW). Launched in February 2, 1999. Rebranded as the Nick Jr. Channel on September 28, 2009. Relaunched as a streaming service from 2015 to 2024, and again in 2025.
Odyssey Network	Crown Media Holdings (Hallmark Cards)	Originally Launched as two separate networks: American Christian Television System (a Christian teaching channel) and Vision Interfaith Satellite Network (interfaith programming). VISN and ACTS merged and became Faith & Values Channel. The network was renamed again in 1996 as Odyssey. Hallmark Entertainment and The Jim Henson Company purchased the network, which was relaunched as Hallmark Channel in 2001.
PAX TV	Ion Media	Relaunched i: Independent Television on July 1, 2005, and then Ion Television on January 29, 2007.
PBS Kids Sprout	PBS/NBCUniversal	Launched on September 26, 2005, replacing the original, 24-hour PBS Kids channel. NBCUniversal acquired full ownership of the network and renamed Sprout in 2013, and then Universal Kids on September 9, 2017.
Pinwheel (C-3)	Qube	Rebranded on April 1, 1979, to Nickelodeon.
Prevue Channel	Lionsgate	Launched in 1981, as the Electronic Program Guide, then became the Prevue Guide, then modified slightly into Prevue Channel. Purchased by TV Guide in 1999 and renamed TV Guide Channel and then became the TV Guide Network in 2007, and then shortened to TVGN in 2013, rebranded to Pop on January 14, 2015.
Sci-Fi Channel	NBCUniversal	Renamed Syfy on July 7, 2009.
Smile of a Child	Trinity Broadcasting Network	Renamed Smile on January 1, 2017.
SonBeam Channel	Three Angels Broadcasting Network	Renamed 3ABN Kids Network.
SpeedVision	SPEED Channel Inc. (Fox Corporation)	Renamed Speed, replaced by Fox Sports 1 on August 17, 2013.
Star Channel	Showtime Networks (Paramount Skydance)	Relaunched to become The Movie Channel in 1979.
Sundance Channel	AMC Networks	Renamed Sundance TV on February 1, 2014.
Telefutura	Univision Communications	Rebranded UniMás on January 7, 2013.
The Nashville Network	Viacom	Renamed The National Network on September 25, 2000. Acquired by Viacom and relaunched Spike on August 11, 2003, then rebranded Paramount Network on January 18, 2018.
Toon Disney	The Walt Disney Company	Launched on April 18, 1998. Replaced by Disney XD on February 13, 2009.
ValueVision	ValueVision Media	Relaunched as ShopNBC in 2001, then ShopHQ in 2013, then Evine in 2015, then to ShopHQ again on August 21, 2019.
VH1 Smooth	Viacom	Renamed VH1 Classic in 1999 and then became MTV Classic on August 1, 2016, in honor of MTV's 35th anniversary.
VH1 Country	Viacom	Renamed CMT Pure Country on May 27, 2006, and then CMT Music on January 4, 2016.
VH1 Soul	Viacom	Renamed BET Soul on December 28, 2015.
Viewer's Choice	Comcast/Cox Communications/Charter Communications	Rebranded as In Demand on January 1, 2000.
WealthTV	Herring Broadcasting	Rebranded AWE on October 1, 2013.
ZDTV	Ziff Davis	Bought by Vulcan Inc. and rebranded as TechTV on September 18, 2000.
