= DirecTV Cinema =

Pay-per-view television service of DirecTV

- Type: Service of DirecTV
- Industry: Motion picture
- Founded: 1994; 32 years ago
- Headquarters: United States
- Products: Film distribution

DirecTV Cinema (previously known as Direct Ticket, Blockbuster Ticket, Blockbuster Pay-Per-View Movies, and DirecTV Pay-Per-View) is DirecTV's video on demand and pay-per-view platform for film content. Films are released as is done on other pay-TV services, along with exclusive film premieres priced at premium rates before entering theatrical distribution.

== History ==
Launched with DirecTV in 1994, the Direct Ticket service, as it was known then, carried much the same output as other PPV services did: first-run movies (starting every half-hour), sports, and other special events. The service originally took up channels 101 through 199 when it first began. It had a distinct advantage over cable-based services such as Viewer's Choice and Request TV, in that due to DirecTV's digital compression technology, it enabled them to transmit more channels that it could reserve to offer pay-per-view content to customers. (Most cable systems of the era had headend capacities capable of transmitting only one or two PPV channels; at the time, however, some systems had begun to make system upgrades within their service areas to increase channel capacity, allowing them to offer as many as five PPV channels in these so-called "rebuild areas", depending on the provider.) Furthermore, because a phone jack was built into the Digital Satellite System (DSS) set-top boxes, PPV purchases could be made directly through the set-top-box mere minutes before or even during a movie or event; cable subscribers would have to call a phone number to authorize the purchase hours in advance. Movies were offered for as little as $3.99 a showing. New movies would be added every week.

Also offered by DirecTV were several sports-oriented PPV services, most notably NFL Sunday Ticket; these services were promoted separately from the other PPV channels. By 1996, DirecTV had expanded the capabilities of the Direct Ticket service to include Dolby Surround sound, broadcasting films in letterbox format, and the "All-Day Ticket" (meaning once a program was purchased, it could be viewed on any Direct Ticket channel showing it until 6:00 a.m. the following day). Via the alternate audio functionality on the DSS boxes, select films could also be viewed with Spanish audio.

In 2001, the Direct Ticket service was rebranded as Blockbuster Ticket, as part of a joint marketing venture between DirecTV and Blockbuster that began in 2000 (though the rebranding did not take effect until 2001, as Blockbuster needed to meet sales goals for the DirecTV service itself); it was partially a means of Blockbuster attempting to stay ahead of the curve technology-wise. This meant that Blockbuster stores would now promote the Blockbuster Ticket service in-store at their pre-existing DirecTV kiosks. Blockbuster also received a cut of PPV revenue from DirecTV customers who signed up at a Blockbuster store. Event programming continued to use the Direct Ticket name and was not co-branded.

By 2005, the Blockbuster venture had ended and the service was renamed simply to DirecTV Pay-Per-View. However, advances in technology meant DirecTV could now being offering video-on-demand services as its cable rivals did, in conjunction with PPV service. DirecTV On Demand requires an internet connection, and for some viewers, that isn't an option; thus, DirecTV Cinema (as it became known by 2012) continues to offer traditional pay-per-view service, now on channels 126 through 177. A 4K Cinema channel is offered on channel 107.

DirecTV currently has deals with film distributors A24 and Vertical Entertainment to release select films exclusively on the platform, 30 days prior to their theatrical releases.

In December 2014, it was announced DirecTV Cinema would premiere digitally re-mastered versions by Harvey Weinstein of the films El Cid and Circus World exclusively for the month of January 2015.
