= YTA TV =

American television network

YTA
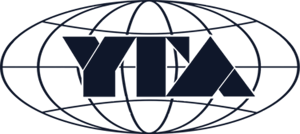
- Headquarters: Bridgeport, Pennsylvania

Ownership
- Owner: Invincible Entertainment Corp.

History
- Launched: February 1, 1985; 41 years ago
- Replaced: America One (2014 merger)
- Former names: Nostalgia Channel (1985–90); Nostalgia Television (1990–97); Nostalgia Good TV (1997–98); GoodLife TV Network (1998–2005); AmericanLife TV Network (2005–11); Youtoo TV (2011–2014); Youtoo America (2014–2020)

Links
- Website: ytatv.com

YTA TV (an initialism for Your Television America, commonly referred to as just YTA; informally referred to as the YTA Television Network) is an American television network which originally launched in February 1985 as a cable channel. Unusual for a network of its type, it has had multiple identities, programming directions, and brandings, along with owners, and after merging with the minor broadcast network America One in 2014, transitioning from a cable-only network to free over-the-air television. It is owned by Center Post Media, which also owns Biz Television.

Approximately 41 million households have reception of YTA TV in some manner through cable or over-the-air reception. It is also available through streaming apps on various digital media players, and on its website.

== Background ==
=== The Nostalgia Channel ===

In February 1985, the channel originally launched as a cable channel, The Nostalgia Channel, through the efforts of former Our Gang child star George "Spanky" McFarland. The channel featured vintage movies, similar to American Movie Classics, which debuted five months earlier as a premium channel broadcasting only during the afternoon and nighttime hours, and Turner Classic Movies, which would launch nine years later. Many of the films were in the public domain.

=== Nostalgia Television ===
Michael E. Marcovsky was hired as network head in early 1990. He changed the channel's name to Nostalgia Television, removed movies with poor quality prints (primarily public domain movies), and added lifestyle series as well as vintage TV programs. Also, 100 movies were programmed from the eclectic Janus Collection. At this time, movies were 25% of the programming.

=== Unification Church ===
In December 1993, International Family Entertainment, Inc. was bidding against a partnership of Florida-based MOR Music TV Inc. and Arizona-based Gen-She Inc., and 1/3 owner Concept Communications (owned by Unification Church) for the network. Nostalgia Television changed its name to Nostalgia Good TV in 1997.

Nostalgia licensed the Goodlife trademark and changed its name to Goodlife TV in 1998 when Unification Church purchased the rest of the company. In 2004, Goodlife TV announced that it would sign a licensing agreement and partnership with Warner Bros. Domestic Television Distribution to broadcast its classic television shows on the channel. Following the expiration of the Goodlife licensing agreement in 2005 with no renewal, the channel changed names again to American Life TV (ALTV).

According to a June 2007 story in Variety, the network was a consistent money-loser, although the church's tax-exempt status made it easier to absorb the losses. The channel charged providers one of the lowest carriage fees in the industry (between 5-10¢), but despite this, was only available in 10 million households at that time. Comcast refused to carry the channel, citing the lack of quality programming (at that time, made up mainly of public domain programming and anachronistic sitcoms and dramas in barter arrangements, long dropped from higher-profile networks) and dropped it from the systems it acquired in the Adelphia bankruptcy as soon as contractually possible. Despite improving the quality of their programming by picking up the Steven Bochco series L.A. Law, Hill Street Blues, St. Elsewhere and equity for carriage, both DirecTV and Dish continued to refuse carriage.

In 2001, ALTV broadcast the Unification Church-sponsored film Inchon (1982), one of the few times it has been seen since its initial theatrical run. In 2007 the network broadcast George Clooney's documentary, A Journey to Darfur. It released the film on DVD in 2008 and announced that proceeds from its sale would be donated to the International Rescue Committee for its humanitarian efforts in Darfur. In 2007, ALN made a video on demand deal with TVN Entertainment Corporation to offer up to 20 hours of programming per month to more than 100 cable affiliates.

=== ComStar ===
In May 2009, the network was acquired by ComStar Media Fund, an organization chaired by Robert A. Schuller, son of Crystal Cathedral founder Robert H. Schuller. Schuller said that the network would concentrate on "family-values programming that speaks to all generations." On November 29, Schuller's new program Everyday Life was first seen on ALTV.

Chris Wyatt, ComStar's chief executive officer and founder of religious website Godtube, commented: "We are not creating another religious network but rather a family-values channel. We've tapped into a huge underserved market and have the opportunity over time to increase distribution to exceed 40 million homes." Media reports indicated that the network's on-air presentation would change and that other syndicated series would be targeted for acquisition.

On December 1, 2009, ALN announced that it would start airing episodes of Chuck Norris' World Combat League, previously seen on the Versus network. ComStar also has access to a library of classic television programing including Happy Days and My Three Sons. Some of the older television shows moved from ALN to its sister network, FamilyNet on March 1, 2010, when it was spun out into its own company with Robert A. Schuller as the chairman.

=== Youtoo ===
On September 27, 2011, ALN was rebranded as Youtoo TV with a focus on mobile devices; as of that date, all links to the website redirected to a page inviting viewers to sign up for the new service at youtoo.com. The only "retro" programs remaining on the schedule were Batman, The Green Hornet, and The X-Files.

Executives claimed Youtoo TV to be a social television service, allowing viewers to participate in television programming using personal electronic devices. Interactive features included the ability for viewers to create and submit 15-second videos, called "Fame Spots", commenting on a variety of subjects.

In addition, the network carried programming such as Howcast and Christopher Coppola's Digivangelist Show. Also on the network were new TV versions of Web series including GeekBeat.TV, Koldcast, and Rooftop Media. The network also had interactive programs including Say Yes & Marry Me, which offered viewers the opportunity to propose marriage on-air via Fame Spots. Re-purposed programming from Revision3 was removed from the network after that provider's sale to Discovery Communications in 2012.

One of the creators of Youtoo TV was producer Mark Burnett, through his own social media project, by content marketing studio VIMBY.

It was reported in September 2014 that Youtoo TV had acquired America One, its network of terrestrial (mostly low-power) affiliates, and most of its remaining non-sports programming. (Prior to this, only one terrestrial affiliate, WBQP-CD, carried Youtoo over the air.) The merger was finalized in the spring of 2015, with the resulting network becoming "Youtoo America". Over the course of late 2019 and early 2020, it began using the shortened branding of YTA, presumably due to confusion with YouTube and its similarly named YouTube TV streaming service, and channel drift away from the 2011 social television model.

=== Invincible Entertainment Corp. Acquisition ===
On October 5, 2022, Invincible Entertainment Corp., then operating as Invincible Entertainment Partners, acquired YTA. The company reoriented the network toward its nostalgia roots, adopting a Cold War-era aesthetic and dropped the "Youtoo" name, creating the backronym Your Television America to fit the YTA initials.

== Carriage ==
The network is available on Time Warner Cable and Comcast, among other providers. Charter Communications previously carried the channel until November 15, 2011, when the channel was dropped from Charter's lineups; this decision was made before the re-brand of ALN, as the channel received carriage under that provider's "faith and values"/religious tier of networks and no longer carried religious or family-appropriate programming for a majority of the broadcast day. At the launch of Youtoo, the network offered up to $200 in bill credits to viewers who switched to a provider that offered the network. As per an email sent to its subscribers, Verizon FiOS dropped the channel on December 31, 2012, along with MAVTV, and Blue Highways TV.

YTA TV offers a live feed of its programming on the Internet, along with some on-demand programming behind a soft paywall.

== Programming ==
YTA TV currently provides 20 hours of programming every day from 6:00 a.m. to 2:00 a.m. Eastern Time, with overnight hours being occupied by a simulcast of the shopping channel Shop LC.

Programming on YTA TV includes:

- The 900 Series
- Adventures of Sonic the Hedgehog
- Alive & Well TV
- The Big Biz Show
- Bloom
- Championship Wrestling from Hollywood
- Charlie Moore: No Offense
- Chasing Down Madison Brown
- The Chef's Kitchen
- Coffee with America
- Crazy in Texas
- The Daily Flash
- Daytime
- Forensic Files
- Heartland Poker Tour
- Hiring America
- In This Corner
- Jack Hanna's Animal Adventures
- Jack Hanna's Into the Wild
- The Jet Set
- Jimmy Durante Presents the Lennon Sisters
- Jimmy Houston Outdoors
- Kong: The Animated Series
- Laura McKenzie's Traveler
- Life of Cards
- Macabre Theatre
- Motorz
- Nature Knows Best
- OVW Wrestling
- Pawn Stars
- Planet X
- Popeye
- Positively Paula
- Put Some Colour in Your Life
- Raceweek
- Reel Animals Fishing
- Ron Hazelton's House Calls
- Small Town Big Deal
- Sport Compact TV
- Sport Fishing with Dan Hernandez
- Sports Stars of Tomorrow
- Steel Dreams
- The Suki and Scott Show
- Talk! with Audrey
- Talking Pictures
- Weird but True!
- Xploration Awesome Planet
- Xploration Outer Space

== Affiliates ==
=== California ===
- Victorville/Lucerne Valley – KVVB-LD 33.1

=== Colorado ===
- Dove Creek – K48BK-D 48.1

=== Florida ===
- Oldsmar – WZRA-CD 48
- Perry – WSFD-LD 15.1

=== Georgia ===
- Atlanta – WEQT-LD 9.5
- Dublin – W35BB-D 35.1

=== Indiana ===
- Jasper – WJTS-CD 27.1
- Martinsville – WREP-LD 15.1

=== Louisiana ===
- Morgan City – KWBJ-CD 22.80

=== Minnesota ===
- St. James – K40BU-D 40.1

=== Missouri ===
- Joplin – KGCS-LD 21.1

=== Nevada ===
- Las Vegas - KDNU-LD 7.3

=== New York ===
- Glens Falls – WNCE-CD 8.1
- Gloversville - WFNY-CD 16.4
- Southampton – WVVH-CD 50.1

=== North Carolina ===
- Elizabeth City – W18BB-D 18.1
- Tarboro – WNCR-LD 41.1

=== Oregon ===
- Dallas – KSLM-LD 17.1
- Portland – KWVT-LD 17.1
- Salem – KORS-CD 16.2
- Salem – KWVT-LD 49.1

=== Pennsylvania ===
- Hazleton – WYLN-LP 35.1

=== Texas ===
- Amarillo – KBEX-LP 6
- Corpus Christi – KHCC-LP 35

=== Utah ===
- Salt Lake City – KPDR-LD 19.1
