= Duke Networks =

Duke Networks, LLC is a San Diego–based television production company and online media company. It produces educational DIY (Do it yourself) programs and distributes them through its network of distribution partners, which include Amazon Video, Roku, YouTube, television networks and more. Founded by Chris Duke, Duke Networks is based out of San Diego, California.

Duke Networks produces an automotive DIY how-to television show, Motorz TV.

== History ==
On May 9, 2008, Duke Networks began an online television series named Truckblog TV.

On September 10, 2008, Duke Networks changed the name to Motorz TV to attract a larger audience and brand the series independently, separate from Truckblog.

On February 7, 2010, Motorz TV premiered nationwide on the American cable and satellite television network, MavTV.
