= WJCT (TV) =

Television station in Jacksonville, Florida

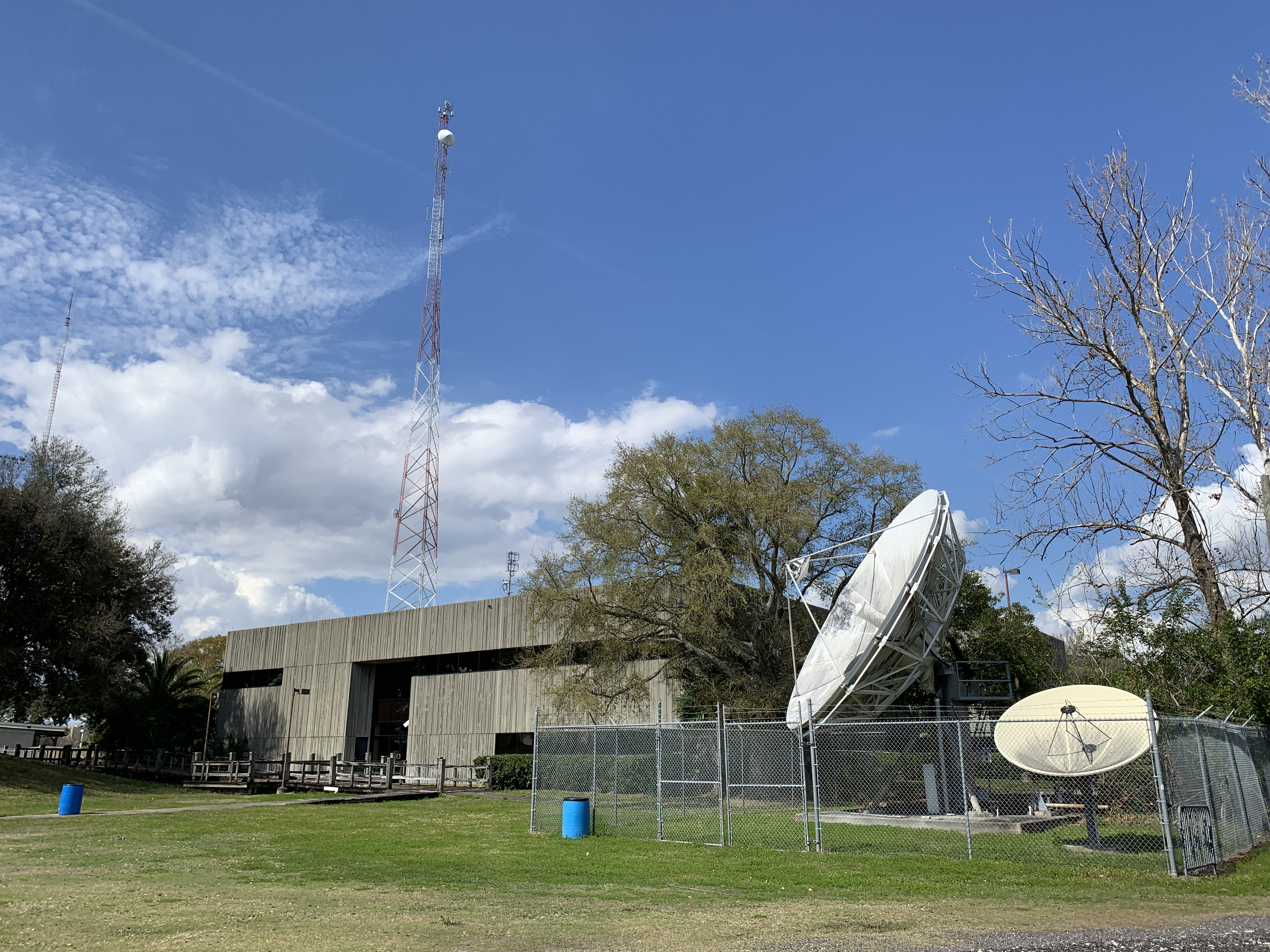
- WJCT Studios, February 2021
- Jacksonville, Florida; United States
- Channels: Digital: 9 (VHF); Virtual: 7
- Branding: Jax PBS

Programming
- Affiliations: 7.1: PBS; for others, see § Subchannels

Ownership
- Owner: WJCT, Inc.
- Sister stations: Radio: WJCT-FM

History
- First air date: September 10, 1958
- Former call signs: WETJ (CP, 1957)
- Former channel numbers: Analog: 7 (VHF, 1958–2009); Digital: 38 (UHF, until 2009), 7 (VHF, 2009-2020)
- Former affiliations: NET (1958–1970)
- Call sign meaning: Jacksonville Community Television

Technical information
- Licensing authority: FCC
- Facility ID: 73130
- ERP: 17.5 kW
- HAAT: 296.6 m (973 ft)
- Transmitter coordinates: 30°16′51.9″N 81°34′12.2″W

Links
- Public license information: Public file; LMS
- Website: www.wjct.org

WJCT (channel 7), branded as Jax PBS, is a PBS member television station in Jacksonville, Florida, United States. It is owned by WJCT, Inc., alongside NPR member WJCT-FM 89.9. The two outlets share studios on Festival Park Avenue in Downtown Jacksonville's Stadium District; the TV station's transmitter is located on Hogan Road in the city's Killarney Shores section.

== History ==
=== Before the airwaves ===
In 1952, Dr. Heywood Dowling, a local podiatrist, learned that the Federal Communications Commission (FCC) had reserved 242 local television channels for non-commercial educational use, including the allocation for channel 7 for Jacksonville. Dowling then undertook a six-year campaign to license and fund an educational television station for the First Coast region. His efforts were successful, and WJCT signed on the air on September 10, 1958.

=== Today in the Legislature ===
In 1973, Florida Public Broadcasting, a joint venture between WJCT and Tallahassee PBS station WFSU-TV, under the aegis of the Florida Public Broadcasting Service, began a program covering the Florida Legislature, which was syndicated to Florida's eight PBS member stations, from a mobile facility located on the grounds of the State Capitol. The program, Today in the Legislature, was the first of its kind in the United States, preceding legislative programs in other states, and U.S. Congressional coverage by C-SPAN.

Reaction to the first year of the program was positive. The state legislature dedicated funds to expand the program, managed exclusively by WJCT. Production facilities migrated into the (old) Capitol building, with engineering and studio facilities constructed on the third floor. The first broadcast from the new facility was on April 2, 1974. Today in the Legislature expanded into an hour-long weekday program during the legislative session, with a one-hour Spanish language summary, Hoy en la Legislatura, produced on Fridays as well as an American sign language program. It was hosted by veteran broadcaster Jim Lewis, with additional commentary by Elizabeth "Bib" Willis. Research, engineering, and production crews were composed chiefly of recent graduates from the Florida State University Department of Communications (now the Florida State University College of Motion Picture, Television and Recording Arts), nearly all under the age of 25, including producer Elliott C. Mitchell and director John P. Leu, as well as future Georgia legislator Chesley V. Morton, who worked as a still photographer and camera operator for the program. Today in the Legislature was described as a "unique blend of television of record and more conventional news coverage." A research study concluded that the program generated more positive attitudes about the legislature and increased political knowledge in adolescents who viewed the broadcast, although only 12% found the programming to be "interesting".

=== Rebranding ===
On February 24, 2021, the station re-branded as Jax PBS, adopting the current PBS corporate logo in the process.

== Technical information ==
=== Subchannels ===
The station's digital signal is multiplexed:

Subchannels of WJCT
Subchannel	Res.	Short name	Programming
7.1	1080i	WJCT-HD	PBS
7.2	480i	Create	Create
7.3	480i	Kids	PBS Kids
7.4	480i	FLCH	The Florida Channel
7.5	480i	World	World
4.2	720p	DABL	Dabl (WJXT)

Broadcast on behalf of another station

=== Analog-to-digital transition ===
WJCT discontinued analog broadcasting on April 6, 2009, ahead of the federally-mandated deadline on June 12.

WJCT-HD4 carries The Florida Channel full time. As of January 5, 2026, the subchannel transitioned to a 24-hour schedule exclusively dedicated to The Florida Channel, replacing its previous mix of daytime Florida Channel programming and off-hours WJCT and PBS content branded as "Jax PBS More!". The subchannel formerly carried Florida Knowledge Network during the same weekday daytime period, with remaining airtime filled by "WJCT International", until that network’s closure in 2011.
