= List of television networks in the United States =

Television networks in the United States are in four lists:

- List of United States over-the-air television networks
- List of United States cable and satellite television networks
- List of defunct television networks in the United States
