= NCTV =

NCTV may refer to:

- National College Television, a campus television network from the 1980s
- Niños Cantores Televisión, a Venezuelan regional television channel
- Nationaal Coördinator Terrorismebestrijding en Veiligheid, the Dutch official counter-terrorism and national security unit
