= FKN =

FKN may refer to:

- Florida Knowledge Network, a defunct American television network
- Franklin Municipal–John Beverly Rose Airport, in Virginia, United States
- Frankston railway station, in Victoria, Australia
