= Marlins Television Network =

From 1993 to 2005, the Marlins Television Network aired games to homes not only in South Florida but to other parts of Florida. The network was produced by the same crew that telecast Marlins games on cable television. When Fox Sports Florida signed an exclusive long-term deal for Marlins baseball starting in the 2006 season, that signaled the end of the Marlins Television Network as a majority of those telecasts would air on Sun Sports.

== Affiliates by market ==
=== Miami (Flagship) ===
- WBFS-TV (1993–1998)
- WAMI-TV (1999–2001)
- WPXM-TV (2002–2005)

=== Palm Beach/Treasure Coast ===
- WPTV (1993, split schedule with WAQ)
- W19AQ (1993–1995)
- WTVX-TV (1996–1998)
- WHDT (1999–2000, Palm Beach only)
- WWCI-CA (1999–2000, Treasure Coast only)
- WTCN-CA (2000–2002)
- WPXP (2003–2005)

=== Pensacola ===
- WJTC-TV (1993)

=== Fort Myers/Naples ===
- WTVK-TV (1993–1998)
- WEVU (2004)

=== Orlando/Melbourne/Daytona Beach ===
- WIRB-TV (1993–1994)
- WRBW-TV (1995–1997)

=== Tampa Bay ===
- WTMV-TV (1993–1997; Tampa Bay market removed from Marlins' territory in 1998 with launch of Tampa Bay Rays franchise)

=== Jacksonville ===
- Continental Cablevision (1993–1998, Cable system carried games; became MediaOne in 1997)

=== Gainesville/Ocala ===
- Cox Sports Television (2004–2005, Cable system carried games)

== See also ==
- Major League Baseball on regional sports networks
- List of Florida Marlins broadcasters
