= Channel 55 virtual TV stations in the United States =

The following television stations operate on virtual channel 55 in the United States:

- KAZD in Lake Dallas, Texas
- KTBU in Conroe, Texas
- W25FC-D in Jasper, Alabama
- WACX in Leesburg, Florida
- WACX-LD in Alachua, etc., Florida
- WBNX-TV in Akron, Ohio
- WFFT-TV in Fort Wayne, Indiana
- WFNA in Gulf Shores, Alabama
- WLNY-TV in Riverhead, New York
- WMYT-TV in Rock Hill, South Carolina
- WPXE-TV in Kenosha, Wisconsin
- WRSP-TV in Springfield, Illinois
- WSST-TV in Cordele, Georgia
- WSST-LD in Albany, Georgia
- WYPX-TV in Amsterdam, New York

The following stations, which are no longer licensed, formerly operated on virtual channel 55 in the United States:

- K16HP-D in East Wenatchee, Washington
- KWVG-LD in Malaga, etc., Washington
