= WJCT =

Non-profit public media corporation

WJCT, Inc
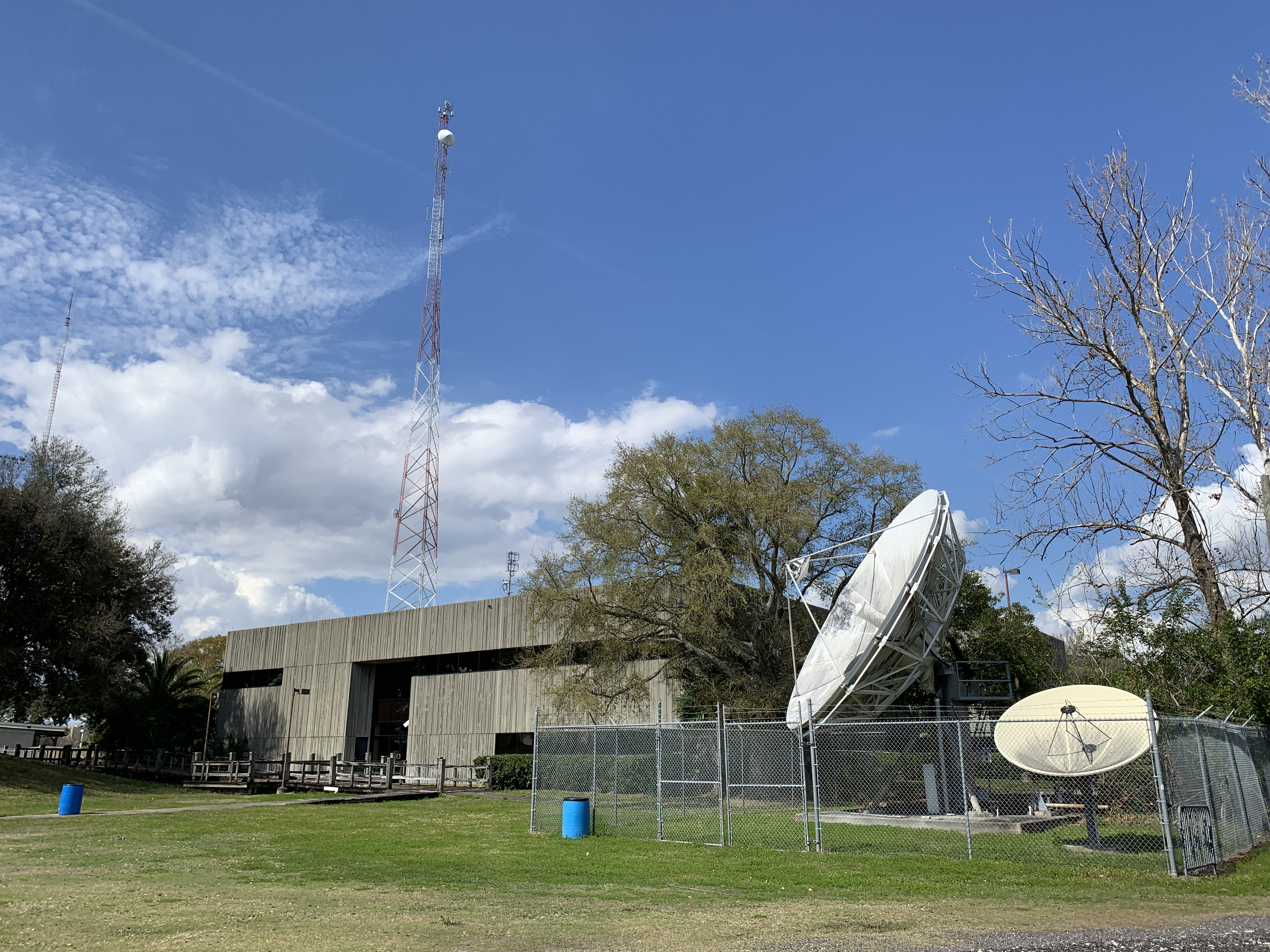
- WJCT Studios, February 2021
- Formation: October 1958; 67 years ago
- Type: 501(c)(3)
- Headquarters: 100 Festival Park Avenue, Jacksonville, Florida, 32202
- Coordinates: 30°19′12″N 81°38′13″W
- Website: www.wjct.org

WJCT, Inc. is a non-profit public media organization in Jacksonville, Florida, United States. It operates PBS member television station WJCT "Jax PBS" (channel 7) and NPR member radio station WJCT-FM 89.9, as well as their associated digital platforms. The company's studios and offices are located on Festival Park Avenue in the Stadium District in downtown Jacksonville.

== History ==
In 1952, following a four-year-long freeze on awarding station licenses, the Federal Communications Commission (FCC) revised its channel allocation table and reserved 242 frequencies, including channel 7 in Jacksonville, for noncommercial educational use. In Jacksonville, podiatrist Dr. Heywood Dowling launched a campaign to bring educational television to the First Coast region. While many other public stations at the time were affiliated with universities, Dowling proposed that Jacksonville's station be owned and funded by the community. Civic leaders embraced the concept, and after years of fundraising, the FCC issued a construction permit for channel 7 on February 27, 1957.

WJCT television first went on the air on September 10, 1958. Its first broadcast was a report by then-Florida governor LeRoy Collins on educational television. As Channel 7 initially had no production facility of its own, it used the studios of the city's two commercial stations, WMBR-TV (channel 4, now WJXT) and WFGA-TV (channel 12, now WTLV). It was Florida's second public television station, following WTHS-TV in Miami. Its service area extended past Jacksonville to Live Oak, St. Augustine, and Palatka, Florida, and Folkston, Georgia. Its first month was dedicated to national programs from National Educational Television.

WJCT added radio station WJCT-FM in 1972. Originally on air under the name "Stereo 90", WJCT-FM's broadcasting covered music, fine arts, news, and public affairs. In October 1973, WJCT produced its first television and radio simulcast of a concert by the Jacksonville Symphony Orchestra.

In 2014, WJCT spearheaded the Digital Convergence Alliance Network Operations Center (DCA-NOC), a central master control operation funded by a grant from the Corporation for Public Broadcasting. This was the first network operations center developed in a partnership of 11 public broadcasting companies.

Beginning March 1, 2026, episodes of the weekly Ring of Honor Wrestling program produced by Ring of Honor (ROH) would be taped at the studios.

== Television ==
The schedule of WJCT television, known as "Jax PBS", includes programming from PBS and other programming services, including the BBC and American Public Television. WJCT also produces and broadcasts local news, public affairs programs, and documentaries. Subchannels include Create, PBS Kids, and World.

On April 6, 2009, as part of the television industry's conversion to digital broadcasting, WJCT commenced operation on digital channel 9, and its analog signal on channel 7 left the air for good.

== Radio ==
WJCT-FM (89.9 MHz) is the primary public radio station in Jacksonville, offering four streams of programming over its HD Radio signal and online. The main subchannel and analog broadcast consists of nationally syndicated public talk shows as well as First Coast Connect, its flagship local news program. Additional subchannels carry the Classical 24 classical music service and two other music services: Anthology, a mix of music from the 1960s, 1970s, and 1980s, and The Independent, focusing on new and local music. WJCT also operates the regional radio reading service, broadcast as an analog subcarrier for the visually impaired and streamed online.
