= Middle of the road (radio format) =

Commercial radio format

Middle of the road (also known by its acronym MOR) is a commercial radio format. Music associated with this term is strongly melodic and uses techniques of vocal harmony and light orchestral arrangements. The format was similar to soft adult contemporary. In the mid-late 2000s the term "middle of the road" became used by journalists as a way to describe musicians and bands such as Train and Westlife who calibrated their musical appeal to commercial, popular music taste and avoided more innovative material.

== Etymology and usage ==
According to music academic Norman Abjorensen, "middle of the road" has referred to a commercial radio format more often than a music genre, although "it has been used to describe a broad type of music" of numerous styles, usually characterized by vocal harmony techniques, prominent melodies, and subtle orchestral arrangements. Radio stations that played adult standards during the 1960s and 1970s were marketed as "MOR radio" in order to differentiate them from Top 40 and rock stations. The middle of the road format was associated with MetroMedia Radio stations; their flagship station was WNEW 1130 AM in New York. The MOR genre creation was an evolutionary outcome of WNEW's reluctance to follow the Top 40 domination and adhere to traditional male and female vocals such as Frank Sinatra, Tony Bennett, Ella Fitzgerald and Peggy Lee. The term "middle of the road" was the creation of WNEW program director Dick Carr.

Soft rock groups like the Association, the 5th Dimension, the Bee Gees, the Johnny Mann Singers and Simon & Garfunkel infiltrated the MOR market in the late 1960s. In the early 1970s, Bread, the Carpenters and John Denver were notable performers in the middle of the road genre. Writing in Christgau's Record Guide: The '80s (1990), Robert Christgau said MOR "applied to radio formats that shun or put stringent tempo and volume restrictions on rock, although 'lite' and 'adult contemporary' are now the preferred evasions."

== Traditional format ==
The middle of the road music category has traditionally included these genres:

- Easy listening
- Traditional pop and, later, revivalist recordings of the style
- Orchestral ballads
- Show tunes
- Smooth jazz melodies
- Soft rock songs and melodies
- Countrypolitan ballads

== Peak ==
As an AM radio format in the United States and Canada, MOR's heyday was the 1960s and the 1970s. The 50,000-watt AM radio stations WLW in Cincinnati, Ohio; WJR in Detroit, Michigan; WNEW in New York City, New York; WCCO in Minneapolis, Minnesota; KMPC in Los Angeles, California; KIRO and KOMO in Seattle, Washington; WTIC in Hartford, Connecticut; and Canadian stations CFRB in Toronto, Ontario and CKNW in Vancouver, British Columbia, were known as "full-service MOR" stations with scheduled programming other than the MOR music. Even though it was not a 50,000-watt station, WMAL in Washington DC achieved some of the highest ratings and revenue of all radio stations in the country by programming MOR music, news, sports, and popular announcers.

In time, as the listener demographic groups aged and popular music migrated to FM radio, MOR stations found themselves competing with adult contemporary FM stations and AM stations broadcasting the Music of Your Life and adult standards formats. In response, most eliminated music and transmitted only news and talk programs; some continued to play MOR music until the early 1990s. MOR (or at least formats bearing a strong resemblance to MOR) were still available as late as 2013; the Memories/Unforgettable Favorites network, a nationwide MOR satellite service, was available until 2006. Many of the styles and genres of music that had traditionally been heard on MOR formatted stations are currently heard on adult standards-formatted stations. The nationally syndicated MeTV FM format, which brands itself as oldies, follows a format similar to MOR.

== Criticism ==
In recent years, the term "middle of the road" has been used pejoratively by genre-specific music aficionados to describe musicians who avoid innovative material, and who calibrate their musical appeal to commercial, popular musical taste. Artists such as Westlife (pop), Kenny Rogers (country) and Train (rock) are considered middle of the road.

Moreover, MOR has been used to pejoratively describe a musical band's creative and commercial progress from the innovative path to appealing only to listeners who refuse to move beyond their past catalog releases and are resistant to any newly-released music from them. MOR is somewhat often used as a derogatory term for this type of music. For example, Pitchfork's review of Duran Duran's Rio states: "The band peppered the 80s with a number of hot singles (most of which can be found on the unstoppable side A of Rio) before departing for MOR country.", while on a later review of Coldplay's X&Y, Pitchfork writes that: "U2 recorded 'I Will Follow', 'New Year's Day', 'Bad', and The Joshua Tree, among others, before they wandered off into the MOR wilderness."

== See also ==
- Album-oriented rock (AOR)
- Full service radio
- Middlebrow
- MOR Music TV, a defunct music video channel with a home shopping element that mainly carried MOR artists
- Yacht rock
