= WHDT =

Television station in Stuart, Florida

- Stuart–West Palm Beach, Florida; United States
- City: Stuart, Florida
- Channels: Digital: 34 (UHF); Virtual: 9
- Branding: The Spot – South Florida 9

Programming
- Affiliations: 9.1: Independent; 5.11: NBC; for others, see § Subchannels

Ownership
- Owner: E. W. Scripps Company; (Scripps Broadcasting Holdings LLC)
- Sister stations: WPTV-TV, WFLX

History
- Founded: May 25, 2000
- First air date: June 1, 2001
- Former channel numbers: Digital: 59 (UHF, 2001–2009), 42 (UHF, 2009–2019)
- Former affiliations: Deutsche Welle (2001–2010); RTV (2010–2011); WxN (2011−2012); TACH-TV (2012–2016); SonLife (2015); Independent (2016–2019); Gun TV (2016−2017); Escape (2019); Court TV (2019–2021)
- Call sign meaning: High Definition Television

Technical information
- Licensing authority: FCC
- Facility ID: 83929
- ERP: 943.1 kW
- HAAT: 440 m (1,444 ft)
- Transmitter coordinates: 26°34′30.7″N 80°14′31.1″W

Links
- Public license information: Public file; LMS
- Website: The Spot - South Florida

WHDT (channel 9), branded as The Spot – South Florida 9, is an independent television station licensed to Stuart, Florida, United States, serving the West Palm Beach area. It is owned by the E. W. Scripps Company alongside NBC affiliate WPTV-TV (channel 5) and managed with Fox affiliate WFLX (channel 29). The three stations share studios on Banyan Boulevard in downtown West Palm Beach; WHDT's transmitter is located near Wellington west of US 441/SR 7.

While the present facility dates to 2002, WHDT dates to 1997, originally as a low-power station. It was founded by Günter Marksteiner and was early to convert to high-definition program origination and broadcasting, including being the first digital-only television station authorized for must-carry. Early programming consisted of a mix of Deutsche Welle output and classic reruns before cycling through a mix of programming services. Scripps bought WHDT from Marksteiner in 2018; the station features Florida Panthers hockey telecasts and some syndicated programs.

== History ==
=== Early years ===
While today a full-service station with a full-market signal, WHDT has its roots in a group of low-power stations founded by Günter Marksteiner. It began broadcasting as a low-power station on channel 55 in late 1997. Half of its broadcast day was devoted to European news programs, such as from Deutsche Welle, and the rest to classic reruns, though it was also the local affiliate of the Florida Marlins and Miami Heat television networks. The WB offered an affiliation to WHDT-LP in 1999, when it dropped Superstation WGN as a national affiliate and left a gap needing filling in the West Palm Beach market, but Marksteiner believed that the network's young audience did not fit his older existing viewer base. By 1999, MIG Group, Marksteiner's broadcasting company, owned low-power stations in West Palm Beach, Miami, Naples, and Stuart, Florida, as well as in Boston and in New Hampshire. The Florida stations originated programming from studios on the 12th floor of the Centurion Tower in West Palm Beach.

Marksteiner was an early adopter of high-definition programming. On January 1, 2000, WHDT was slated to begin broadcasting in high-definition, at a time when no West Palm Beach station was broadcasting a digital signal; Marksteiner envisioned the stations serving as the core of a pay-per-view high definition movie service for home theater users. But the station was off the air by October 2000 in continued preparation for its digital broadcasting activities. This triggered a critical legislative battle. WHDT lobbied for must-carry access to West Palm Beach–market cable systems, a first for a digital-only station. In the meantime, despite building out high-definition production studios, the station continued to broadcast an analog signal in the West Palm Beach area. In January 2001, the Federal Communications Commission (FCC) ruled that the station could provide primary over-the-air service using only a digital signal. Later, WHDT fought satellite provider Dish Network, which balked at the station's demand to be carried in high-definition at a time when other local channels were provided by satellite carriers in analog.

The full-power WHDT made a quiet debut in the few households equipped to receive digital television signals on May 2, 2002. Its signal reached an area from Port St. Lucie to Hobe Sound. By 2005, it was airing two local programs: the short film series Screening Room and South Florida Fishing Report.

WHDT cycled through program services, including the Retro Television Network, WeatherNation TV, and The Auto Channel.

=== Scripps ownership ===
On December 3, 2018, it was announced that WHDT would be sold to the E. W. Scripps Company for $25 million. The sale was completed on April 4, 2019.

WHDT's primary channel switched on July 7, 2021, from the Court TV diginet to a new program service from Scripps known as Florida 24, consisting of statewide news and information from the Scripps stations across the state; some syndicated programs; and rebroadcasts of selected WPTV newscasts. In 2024, WHDT became part of the Florida Panthers television network after Scripps Sports obtained telecast rights to the NHL team.

== Technical information ==
=== Subchannels ===
The station's signal is multiplexed:

Subchannels of WHDT
Subchannel	Res.	Short name	Programming
9.1	720p	WHDT	Main WHDT programming
9.2	480i	CourtTV	Court TV
9.3	480i	Scripps	Grit
9.4	480i	HSN	HSN
9.5	480i	QVC	QVC
9.6	480i	ONTV4U	OnTV4U
5.11	1080i	WPTV	NBC (WPTV-TV) UHF simulcast

Simulcast of subchannels of another station

As part of the digital television transition, UHF channels 52-69 were removed from the broadcast spectrum. Consequently, WHDT moved its digital signal from channel 59 to channel 42 after WXEL-TV shut off its analog signal on channel 42 on June 12, 2009. Because WXEL-TV continued to use its former analog channel number 42 as a virtual channel, WHDT was assigned 9 as its new virtual channel. WHDT moved to RF channel 34 in the repacked UHF TV band following conclusion of the spectrum incentive auction in early 2017.
