= KTBU =

Television station in Conroe, Texas

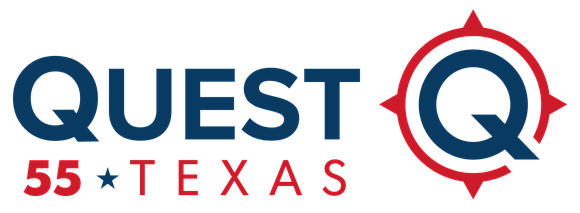
- Conroe–Houston, Texas; United States
- City: Conroe, Texas
- Channels: Digital: 33 (UHF); Virtual: 55
- Branding: Quest 55 Texas

Programming
- Affiliations: 11.11: CBS; 55.1: Quest / CBS (alternate); for others, see § Subchannels

Ownership
- Owner: Tegna Inc., a subsidiary of Nexstar Media Group; (KHOU-TV, Inc.)
- Sister stations: KHOU, Nexstar: KIAH

History
- First air date: July 15, 1998
- Former channel numbers: Analog: 55 (UHF, 1998–2009); Digital: 42 (UHF, 2005–2019)
- Former affiliations: Independent (1998–2011); Mega TV (2011–2020)
- Call sign meaning: Cathode-ray tube ("The Tube" was former branding) transposed

Technical information
- Licensing authority: FCC
- Facility ID: 28324
- ERP: 1,000 kW
- HAAT: 597 m (1,959 ft)
- Transmitter coordinates: 29°33′45.2″N 95°30′35.9″W

Links
- Public license information: Public file; LMS

KTBU (channel 55) is a television station licensed to Conroe, Texas, United States, serving as the Houston area outlet for the digital multicast network Quest. It is owned by the Tegna subsidiary of Nexstar Media Group alongside CBS affiliate KHOU (channel 11); Nexstar also owns CW station KIAH (channel 39). KHOU and KTBU share studios on Westheimer Road near Uptown Houston; KTBU's transmitter is located near Missouri City, in unincorporated northeastern Fort Bend County. Previously, KTBU maintained separate facilities on Old Katy Road in the northwest side of Houston, while the KHOU studios only housed KTBU's master control and some internal operations.

== History ==
=== Lakewood Church and Humanity Interested Media's "The Tube" (1998–2006) ===
The station first signed on the air on July 15, 1998, from facilities located on Old Katy Road near Memorial Park in northwest Houston. It was established as a for-profit corporation jointly owned by Charles Dowen Johnson's Humanity Interested Media, Inc. (later Shepherds for the Savior) and John Osteen's Lakewood Church. Lakewood Church bought a 49% share in the station for $2 million. Joel Osteen ran the station until his father's death in 1999, when Joel began preaching at their church.

KTBU launched as an independent station with a general entertainment format including classic and syndicated television series, movies and sports, plus a slate of locally produced shows focusing on sports, history and other topics of interest to Houstonians. However, Shepherds for the Savior later stated,

The idea behind the acquisition of the TV license was to have a local Christian-based TV station that would generate enough income to support his ministry of spreading the message of Jesus by supporting ministries worldwide.

The station started its first broadcast with a religious devotional. Lakewood Church, which previously broadcast their church services on the local CBS affiliate KHOU, began broadcasting them on KTBU, and KTBU added religious programming from 6 a.m. to noon and 10 p.m. to midnight on Sundays, and from 6 to 7 a.m. every weekday from Joyce Meyer and Walter Hallam's megachurch in Texas.

When interviewed in 1998, the Vice President of Marketing (and Joel Osteen's brother-in-law) Don Iloff said they would "reluctantly" broadcast sports shows with beer ads. In 1999, they added a local news program with The News of Texas and began broadcasting live telecasts of University of Houston football, basketball, and baseball games and weekly shows featuring University of Houston coaches.

In 2000, KTBU added more local programming and briefly broadcast Houston Rockets and Houston Comets games. The station was not able to successfully broadcast the Houston Rockets and Comets games, and the sports teams ended their contracts early. The same year, KTBU also decided to end most local programming and layoff between 12 and 16 people. At that time, the General Manager was (later Texas Lt. Governor) Dan Patrick, who was simultaneously the General Manager at KSEV AM radio station; he stepped down from the KTBU in 2001 after the programming problems and scaling back.

In 2004, Lakewood Church bought the remaining stake in the station for $6 million.

In 2006, the church sold KTBU to USFR Media Group for $30.5 million to pay down debts associated with their purchase of the former Compaq Center sports arena (now the Lakewood Church Central Campus).

=== USFR Media Group's "Houston's 55" (2006–2011) ===
Under the new ownership with USFR Media Group, the station moved from its original studios on Old Katy Road to a purpose-built facility on Equity Drive in northwest Houston previously built for the ill-fated News 24 Houston cable news channel, and changed its on-air moniker to "Houston's 55".

=== Spanish Broadcasting System's "Mega TV" (2011–2020) ===
In May 2011, the station was sold to the Spanish Broadcasting System for $16 million. Upon the completion of the sale, KTBU dropped all local and national syndicated programs and joined SBS' Mega TV network.

=== Tegna's "Quest" (2020–present) ===
On January 21, 2020, Tegna Inc. agreed to acquire KTBU for $15 million. The sale was completed on March 24, 2020, making KTBU a sister station to Tegna's CBS affiliate KHOU. Three days later, KTBU's main channel flipped to the Tegna-owned Quest multicast network, and eventually KTBU's operations were moved into KHOU's studios near Uptown Houston.

Upon becoming a Tegna property, it was announced that KTBU would take over as the official local television partner of Major League Soccer's Houston Dynamo. KTBU may air CBS network programming should it be preempted by KHOU for long-form breaking news or severe weather coverage or other special programming. Its main role however, is serving as a UHF rebroadcaster for KHOU via its DT11 subchannel, allowing full-market access to the station for viewers who only have a UHF antenna.

On February 22, 2022, Tegna announced that it would be acquired by Standard General and Apollo Global Management for $5.4 billion. As a part of the deal, KTBU and KHOU, along with their Austin sister station KVUE and Dallas sister stations WFAA and KMPX, would be resold to Cox Media Group. The sale was canceled on May 22, 2023.

Nexstar Media Group, owner of KIAH (channel 39), acquired Tegna in a deal announced in August 2025 and completed on March 19, 2026. A temporary restraining order issued one week later by the U.S. District Court for the Eastern District of California, later escalated to a preliminary injunction, has prevented KHOU and KTBU from being integrated into KIAH.

On October 22, 2026, Tegna announced a multi-year deal with the WNBA's Houston Comets to air the team's non-national exclusive games on KTBU and Space City Home Network (with select contests simulcast on KHOU) beginning in the 2027 season.

== Technical information ==
=== Subchannels ===
The station's signal is multiplexed:

Subchannels of KTBU
Subchannel	Res.	Short name	Programming
55.1	720p	Quest	Quest
55.2	480p	365BLK	365BLK
55.3	480p	Nacion	Nación TV (in Spanish)
55.4	480p	Outlaw	Outlaw
11.11	1080i	KHOU-HD	CBS (KHOU)

Simulcast of subchannels of another station

=== Analog-to-digital conversion ===
KTBU ended regular programming on its analog signal, over UHF channel 55, on June 12, 2009, as part of the federally mandated transition from analog to digital television. The station's digital signal remained on its pre-transition UHF channel 42, using virtual channel 55.

== See also ==
- Channel 33 digital TV stations in the United States
- Channel 55 virtual TV stations in the United States
