= Motorz TV =

- Genre: Automotive
- Created by: Chris Duke
- Written by: Chris Duke
- Starring: Chris Duke
- Country of origin: United States
- No. of seasons: 8
- No. of episodes: 102

Production
- Executive producer: Chris Duke
- Running time: 22 minutes

Original release
- Network: Youtoo America; Rev'n; Untamed Sports TV; Biz Television; The Auto Channel; The Action Channel
- Release: 2008 – present

Motorz (pronounced Motors) is an American television series seen nationwide on Youtoo America, Rev'n, Untamed Sports TV, Biz Television, The Auto Channel, The Action Channel, and globally on Roku and iTunes. The Automotive Improvement® series was hosted by Chris Duke.

Each episode featured installation help of automotive products, vehicle maintenance tips, new products, and a letters segment. The program premiered on the Internet in 2008 and on Television in 2010.

Motorz began life as "Truckblog TV", named after the Truckblog.com website which Chris Duke started in 2004. In September 2008 the name of the series was changed to Motorz to attract a larger audience and brand the series independently, separate from Truckblog.

During its eleven year lifespan, Motorz helped automotive enthusiasts learn more about how to maintain their vehicles and install aftermarket products such as exhaust kits, air intake kits, suspension kits, body kits, steps, tonneau covers, mobile electronics, performance accessories, and more on a varying range of cars and pickup trucks.

Actress Olivia Korte joined the cast as the "Motorz Girl" for season five, and was replaced by actress Brigitte Patton beginning with season six. In this co-starring role, she helps describe the tools needed for the job, along with host Chris Duke. Halfway through season six, the role of the Motorz Girl was phased out. Alan Taylor contributed to the show, adding vehicle test drive and celebrity interview segments from 2014-2018.

== Programming segments ==
- Installation: Automotive maintenance/product installation segment.
- Partz: New products feature.
- Letterz: Viewer questions answered.
- Ridez: Viewer rides profiled.
- Tipz: Automotive "quick tips".

== Timeline ==
Season 1 premiered on the Internet May 9, 2008.
Season 2 premiered on the Internet January 9, 2009.
Season 3 premiered on MavTV February 7, 2010.
Season 4 premiered on MavTV July 4, 2010.
Season 5 premiered on Pursuit Channel September 18, 2011.
Season 6 premiered on Pursuit Channel in August 2013.
Season 7 premiered on Youtoo America, in September 2015. Season 8 premiered on Youtoo America, in February 2018.
