= WJCT-FM =

Public radio station in Jacksonville, Florida

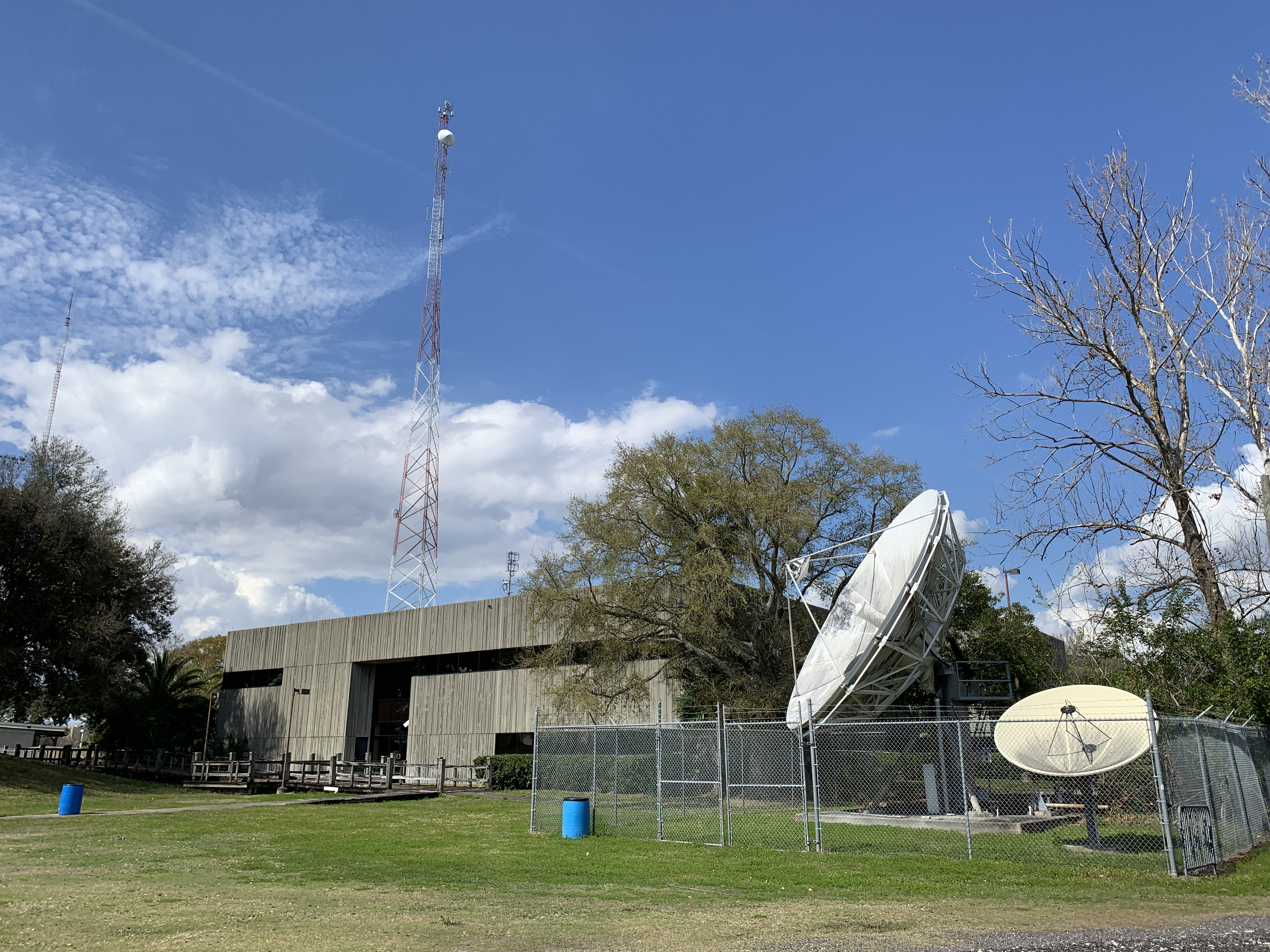
- Jacksonville, Florida; United States
- Frequency: 89.9 MHz (HD Radio)
- Branding: WJCT News 89.9

Programming
- Format: Public radio: News/Talk
- Subchannels: HD2: Classical 24; HD3: Anthology (classic hits); HD4: Jacksonville's Jazz Radio (jazz)
- Affiliations: NPR

Ownership
- Owner: WJCT, Inc.
- Sister stations: WJCT (TV)

History
- First air date: April 10, 1972
- Call sign meaning: Jacksonville Community Television

Technical information
- Licensing authority: FCC
- Facility ID: 73125
- Class: C1
- ERP: 98,000 watts
- HAAT: 251 meters (823 ft)
- Transmitter coordinates: 30°16′51.8″N 81°34′11.9″W

Links
- Public license information: Public file; LMS
- Website: news.wjct.org; HD2; HD3; HD4; Radio Reading Service

WJCT-FM (89.9 MHz) is a public radio station in Jacksonville, Florida. Owned by WJCT, Inc., it is an NPR member station. It shares studios with its sister PBS station WJCT (channel 7) on Festival Park Avenue, near EverBank Stadium in Downtown Jacksonville's Stadium District. Its transmitter facilities are located on Hogan Road in the city's Killarney Shores area. WJCT serves as the primary Emergency Alert System station for the entire First Coast region and Greater Jacksonville metropolitan area.

== HD Radio ==
WJCT broadcasts in HD Radio; it broadcasts three full-time subchannels, Classical 24 on HD2— which carries classical music, Anthology on HD3 - which carries classic hits, and "The Independent" on HD4 - which carries adult album alternative. On its analog subcarrier, WJCT operates the regional radio reading service for the visually impaired, which is also streamed online.

From September to November 2019, the station ran a country music subchannel, Pop-Up Country, on HD4, as a tie-in to Ken Burns' PBS documentary series Country Music.

On July 13, 2020, WJCT-FM converted from its previous mix of news and music into an all-news/talk format with its music programs moved to its HD radio subchannels. On this date, the station became known as WJCT News 89.9.

On April 28, 2022, WJCT-FM's HD4 subchannel changed its format from lounge as "Electro Lounge Radio" to adult album alternative as "The Independent". It changed again on May 21, 2025, to a jazz format as "Jacksonville's Jazz Radio".
