= Chris Duke =

American television personality and host

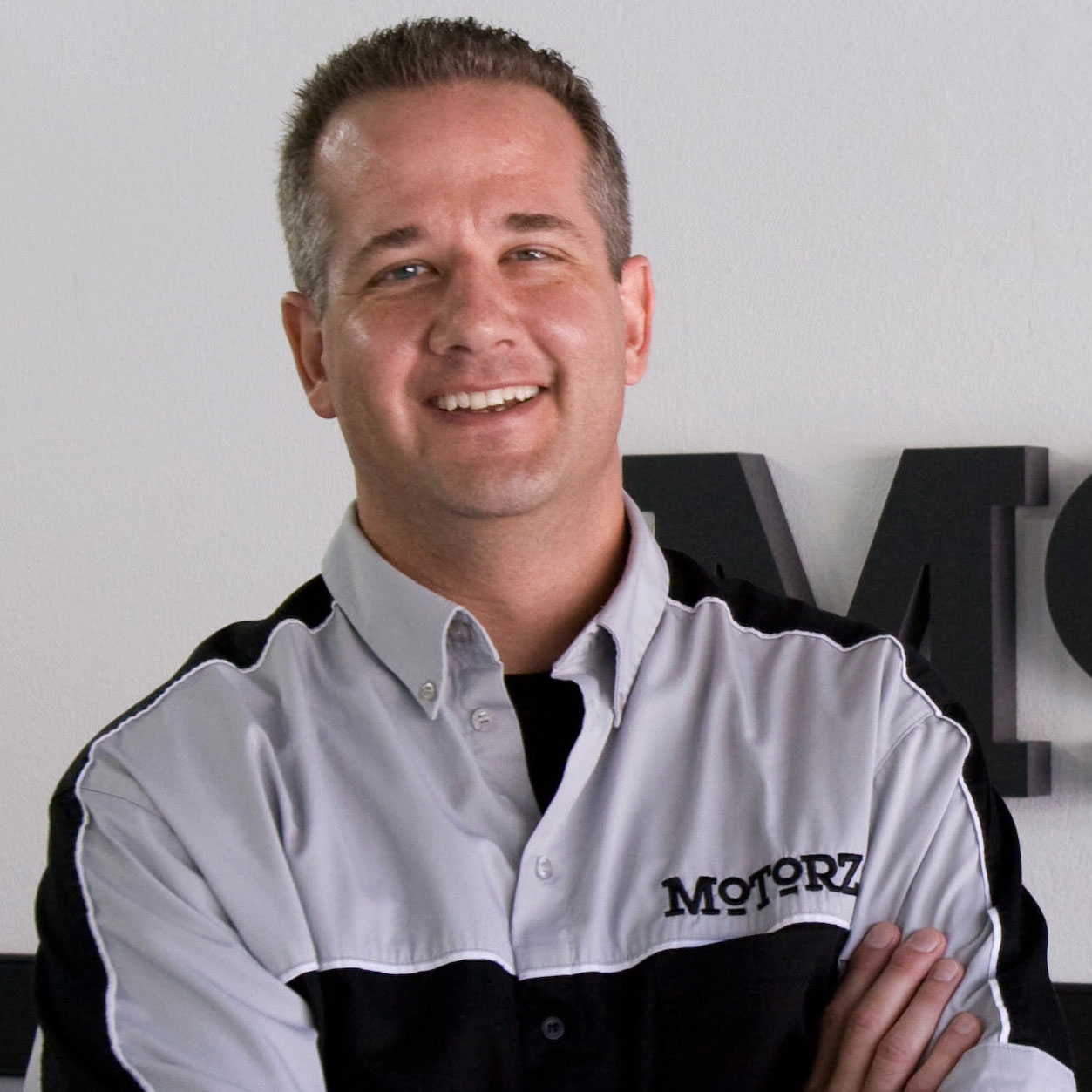
- Chris Duke, Host of Motorz (2010)
- Born: Christopher John Duke; Upland, California, U.S.
- Occupations: TV Host, Entrepreneur, Executive Producer
- Years active: 2008–present
- Website: chris.place, youtube.com/@chris

Chris Duke was the TV host of the TV series Motorz TV and is a YouTube content creator.

== Biography ==
Chris Duke was born just outside Los Angeles, California and raised in Washington State. Growing up with a gear head for an older brother who was re-building engines, Chris' interest in the automotive industry began as soon as he was able to drive. While working for Microsoft right after graduating from Sammamish High School, this autodidact spent most of his evenings and weekends modifying his car, mainly through aftermarket accessories. In addition to installing a massive stereo system that was worth more than the car itself, he designed and built his own 7th order acoustic subwoofer speaker enclosure, made popular by Bose Corporation, that filled the entire rear hatchback of his vehicle.

In 1990 he moved to San Diego, California to pursue a new life in a warmer climate. Still focusing on his technical background in software development, Chris went on to work for Science Applications International Corporation, O'Reilly Media and then TEN Magazines, a startup company which published websites and print publications for automotive enthusiasts. Its first website and magazine was titled Ford Truck World, which was hugely popular in the early 2000s due to Chris' enthusiasm for Ford trucks. Playing the role of Chief Technology Officer for the startup, Chris also held the additional titles of editor, writer, and photographer for the magazine, producing over 300 pages of editorial content which was published nationally on major newsstands. He wrote mostly DIY articles showing how to install aftermarket products on vehicles. The network of automotive sites, based on technology created by Chris, led to over 20 websites serving over 40 million page views per month to 2.2 Million visitors.

Chris left the publishing company in 2005 to pursue his own goals in the automotive industry. After creating new enthusiast sites Truckblog and Muscle Car Blog, he began to grow tired of publishing written editorial. In 2008, Chris was getting ready to document the installation process of another product when it occurred to him that he should try documenting it using video instead. Having had no face time in front of the camera, this was a new experience for him. After presenting the result to his peers, he was met with praise and encouragement. That video turned into the pilot episode of Truckblog TV, named after his enthusiast website. 10 episodes later, Chris decided to branch out beyond just trucks and started a new company called Duke Networks which renamed the show Motorz TV (pronounced "motors") in order to capture a larger audience and open the doors to more opportunities. After two successful seasons producing the show for an online audience, Chris not only spoke at the 2009 SEMA Show, but he also hosted and performed installations on two Ford vehicles at that same show, live in front of show attendees. His career in producing video content for the web took a turn in early 2010 when he was approached by both MavTV and Untamed Sports TV to bring his show to cable and satellite television. The third season of Motorz TV premiered on February 7, 2010 on television in a new weekly half-hour format. The automotive improvement series currently airs on television networks throughout the U.S. and Canada, in addition to Internet sites and Internet connected devices such as Roku and Apple TV. It is in its eighth season as of 2018.

After his company Duke Networks partnered with Sears in 2010, Chris made his first appearance in the Sears Tools catalog as a "tool advisor", then later as a "gift guru" in the October 2011 catalog. After making four consecutive catalog appearances, Chris was named the exclusive automotive tool spokesperson and advisor for all Sears automotive print and online catalogs.

In 2012, Chris was selected to host and co-write the eHow Auto Center series. Produced by Demand Media and sponsored by Mobil 1, the online series offers tips and how-to instructions on auto repair and maintenance projects to help improve longevity, performance, safety and fuel economy for new and used gas-powered, electric or hybrid vehicles.

== Filmography ==
=== Television ===
Year	Title	Role	Notes
2008–present	Chris Duke	Chris Duke	YouTube Channel
2008–2018	Motorz TV	Chris Duke	Series; also executive producer
2012-2013	Auto Center	Chris Duke	Series
