= List of Miami Marlins broadcasters =

Media and broadcast information/history for the Miami Marlins:

== Flagship broadcast outlets ==
All names/call letters used are those used by the broadcaster the last time the team was broadcast on that outlet.

=== Television ===
- SportsChannel Florida/Fox Sports Net Florida/FSN Florida/Fox Sports Florida/Bally Sports Florida/FanDuel Sports Network Florida (1997–present)
- Sunshine Network/Sun Sports (1993–1997, 2006–2010)
- WBFS-TV (1993–1998, 2025 (Note: Select 15 Games to Be Simulcasted from FanDuel Sports Network Florida.))
- WAMI-TV (1999–2001)
- WPXM-TV (2002–2005)
- Marlins Television Network (1993–2005)

=== Radio ===
==== English ====
- WINZ 940 AM (2014–present) – Flagship in Miami
- WAXY 790 AM (2008–2013) – Flagship in Miami
- WQAM 560 AM (1993–2007) – Flagship in Miami
- Marlins Radio Network (1993–present) – Distributes games to radio stations around Florida
- XM Satellite Radio (2005–present) – Carries games as part of MLB package

WQAM did not renew the contract with the Marlins when it expired after the 2007 season at the request of the Miami Dolphins. WAXY 790 (The Ticket) signed a contract to become the flagship station for the Marlins.

==== Spanish ====
- WAQI 710 AM (present)
- WQBA 1140 AM (1998–2008)
- WCMQ 1210 AM (1993–1997)

== Broadcasters ==
=== Television ===
- Joe Angel: TV play-by-play 1997–2000*
- Gary Carter: TV analyst 1993–1996
- Tommy Hutton: TV analyst 1997–2015, 2021–2026
- Len Kasper: TV play-by-play 2002–2004
- Craig Minervini: Reporter 2002–present
- Dave O'Brien: TV play-by-play 1997–2001*
- Jay Randolph: TV play-by-play 1993–1996, Pre-game 1997–2000
- Cookie Rojas: SAP Analyst 2003–present
- Raul Striker Jr.: SAP play-by-play 2003–present
- Preston Wilson: TV analyst 2016
- Eduardo Pérez: TV analyst 2016
- Al Leiter: TV analyst 2016
- Jeff Conine: TV analyst 2016
- Rich Waltz: TV play-by-play 2005–2017
- Todd Hollandsworth: TV analyst 2017–2021
- Paul Severino: TV play-by-play 2018–2024
- Kyle Sielaff: TV play-by-play 2025-2026

=== Radio ===
==== English ====
- Jesse Agler: Radio studio/Marlins extra host 2006–2007
- Joe Angel: Radio play-by-play 1993–2000*
- Roxy Bernstein: Radio play-by-play, 2005–2007
- Glenn Geffner: Radio play-by-play, 2008–2022
- Dave O'Brien: Radio play-by-play, 1993–2000*
- Jon Sciambi: Radio play-by-play 1999–2004, Pre-game 1999–2000
- Dave Van Horne: Radio play-by-play 2001–2021
- Kyle Sielaff: Radio play-by-play 2023-2024
- Stephen Strom: Radio studio host 2023–present
- Jack McMullen: Radio play-by-play 2025–present

==== Spanish ====
- Manolo Alvarez: Spanish radio play-by-play 1993–1998
- Jesus Diaz: Spanish radio play-by-play 1999
- Luis Quintana: Spanish radio play-by-play 2002–present
- Felo Ramírez: Spanish radio play-by-play 1993–2017
- Ángel Rodríguez: Spanish radio play-by-play 2000–2001

== See also ==
- List of current Major League Baseball announcers

== Notes ==
* Angel & O'Brien split innings doing play-by-play between radio and television for four seasons
