= Badger Television Network =

American television network in Wisconsin

- Type: Defunct Broadcast television network
- Country: United States
- Availability: Wisconsin
- Launch date: January 1958; 67 years ago
- Dissolved: August 8, 1958; 66 years ago

The Badger Television Network was an American state network that operated for eight months from January 1958 until it ceased operations on August 8 of that year. The regional television network was made up of three television stations in Wisconsin, WISN-TV (channel 12) in Milwaukee, WFRV-TV (channel 5, now a CBS affiliate) in Neenah/Green Bay and WKOW-TV (channel 27) in Madison. All three stations at the time were affiliates of ABC.

Programs broadcast by the network included Homemaker's Holiday, a quiz show hosted by Charlie Hanson; Good Housekeeping, a lifestyle program hosted by Trudy Beilfuss based on WISN-TV's sister publication via the Hearst Corporation; and Pretzel Party, a variety program originally hosted by Larry Clark. All three programs originated from Milwaukee affiliate WISN-TV. During March 1958, the network also aired Senate Investigating Committee hearings during late-night hours.

== Schedule ==
- 12:30–1:00 p.m. – Pretzel Party
- 1:00–1:30 p.m. – Homemaker's Holiday
- 1:30–2:00 p.m. – Good Housekeeping
- 11:00 p.m.–12:00 p.m. – Hearings (March only)
