= USFR Media Group =

American media company

- Company type: Integrated Media Company
- Founded: 2000
- Defunct: 2011
- Brands: America One; KTBU; Cowboys & Indians (magazine), Polo (magazine), Western & English Today (magazine)

U.S. Farm & Ranch Supply Company, Inc. (d/b/a USFR Media Group) was an integrated media company incorporated in Texas in February 2000. A family-owned business, it was headed by Chairman and CEO Gregory L. Brown, a rancher who previously owned an independent oil and gas firm, and his wife, socialite Linda Lyons Brown. It owned television stations, published lifestyle magazines, and created infomercials and promotional videos.

== First ventures, with magazines and America One ==
USFR Media Group joined John B. Goodman's Westchester Media to publish three magazines Westchester Media previously founded or bought: Cowboys & Indians (magazine), Western & English Today, and a magazine for International Polo Club Palm Beach named Polo that was mired in lawsuits with Ralph Lauren Corporation.

In 1995, they established America One, a network of about 100 stations across the United States.

== Involvement with Stanford Financial Group, and expansion ==
In June 2001, Stanford Financial Group started investing in USFR Media Group as one of many companies that was part of that Ponzi scheme. In total, Stanford invested almost $25 million over nine years.

In 2006, USFR Media Group bought KTBU from Lakewood Church for $30.5 million.

In 2007, they moved their headquarters to a 30,000 square foot broadcasting facility in Houston which had been built by Time Warner and used by News 24 Houston.

Stanford Financial Group's marketing publications touted USFR Media Group as a piece of their investment portfolio.

== Scandal, decline, and dissolution ==
In Feb. 2009, the U.S. Securities and Exchange Commission began a lawsuit against Allen Stanford and the financial services companies involved in his Ponzi scheme. USFR Media Group and other companies that were part of the Stanford investment portfolio were put into receivership. That same year, a shareholder buyout removed America One from USFR. USFR formed a video production division to produce infomercials and promotional videos.

As owners of KTBU, USFR Media Group had ended much of the remaining local programming and mostly aired paid programming, network reruns, and Sunday services from Lakewood Church. However, they had been operating at a loss for several years and could not attract more investors because Stanford was still a stakeholder in their company. John B. Goodman was still an equity shareholder; in December 2009 he formed a Limited Liability Company to buy Stanford's interest and in April 2010 the courts were petitioned to allow this purchase, but in that same timeframe he was arrested for DUI manslaughter during a hit-and-run car accident.

In 2011, USFR Media Group sold KTBU for $16 million to Spanish Broadcasting System. The sale included all assets, the tower operating company, licenses that were still being held under the name Humanity Interested Media (from when KTBU first went on the air), and permits.
