= MOR Music TV =

American music video television channel

- Type: Cable network
- Country: United States
- Headquarters: Tampa Bay

History
- Launched: September 1, 1992; 34 years ago
- Closed: August 31, 1997; 29 years ago

MOR Music TV was an American cable television network that ran music videos 24 hours a day. However, as it played each music video, viewers had the opportunity to buy the album by calling a toll-free number in the same manner as the Home Shopping Network or QVC, and was offered to cable systems with the same revenue sharing opportunities for cable operators from album sales as HSN and QVC offered for item sales. The music ranged from light country to soft rock with no hard rock, heavy metal, or rap music.

The network's name has a double meaning - "MOR" refers to both the word "more" as in "more music" but is also an acronym for "middle of the road", referring to its musical format of light AC and country songs.

The channel closed on August 31, 1997.

== See also ==
- List of defunct television networks in the United States
