= Hot Choice =

American pay-per-view service

- Country: United States

Ownership
- Owner: In Demand Networks (Comcast/Cox Communications/Charter Communications)
- Sister channels: In Demand; MOJO HD

History
- Launched: 1988; 38 years ago
- Closed: July 31, 2025; 15 months ago
- Former names: Viewer's Choice II (1988-1993)

Hot Choice was a pay-per-view service that mainly aired adult content. It was run by In Demand Networks and was carried on some cable television systems.

== History ==
Hot Choice was launched in 1988 as Viewer's Choice II; the channel retained the "Viewer's Choice" name until February 1993, when it was rebranded as "Hot Choice". The service had initially aired a diverse mix of comedy and action/adventure movies geared towards mainly teenagers and adults (essentially, feature films with an MPAA rating of "PG" or higher) that were carried over from its sister network Viewer's Choice/In Demand; and adult-oriented programming at night.

In late 1999, Hot Choice began leaning towards more "R"-rated films; more adult programming began being distributed throughout its daily schedule until 2000 when Hot Choice adopted a mostly adult programming format. During that period, some of the cable systems moved this channel to their digital cable tiers or removed it from their listings altogether. In September 2001, Hot Choice had changed their format to featuring only softcore adult programming.

On Friday, May 10, 2024, an internal memo was released stating that In Demand would wind down operations over the next eighteen months, along with its associated channels. All services ended at 11:59 ET on July 31, 2025, with its website also closing at the same time and only showing an image of In Demand's logo.

== See also ==
- Playboy TV
- Spice Network
