= America One =

U.S. television network

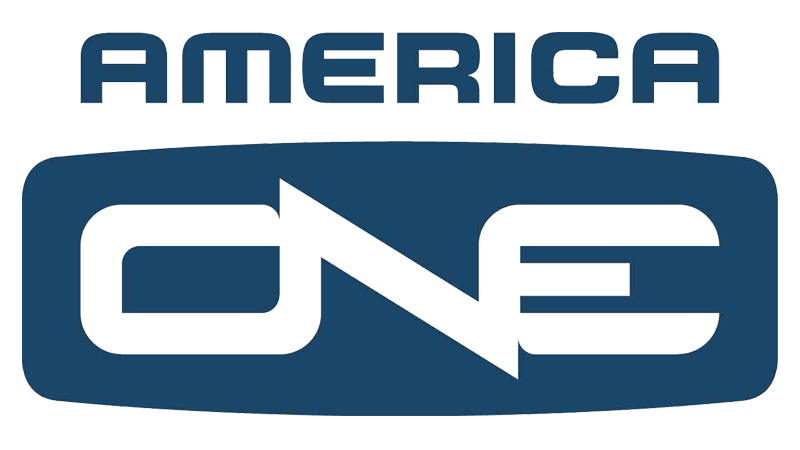
- Type: Free-to-air television network
- Country: United States

Programming
- Language: English
- Picture format: 480i (SDTV)

Ownership
- Owner: America One Television, Inc. (USFR Media Group) (1995–2003); VOTH Network, Inc. (USFR Media Group) (2003–2009); America One Television Network, Inc. (2009–2010); One Media Corp, Inc. (2010–2015); Center Post Networks, LLC (2015)

History
- Launched: 1995
- Closed: July 13, 2015
- Replaced by: YTA TV
- Former names: America One Television (1995–2009); America One Television Network (2009–2010)

America One was an American television network established in 1995 by USFR Media Group through its America One Television subsidiary. The network served over 170 LPTV, Class A, full-power, cable and satellite affiliate stations. It was one of the first TV networks to have online live video streaming before the tech bubble burst in 2000. At least twenty of the stations carried America One's complete 168-hour weekly transmission.

In 2003, the network went through a restructuring, being placed within USFR Media Group's VOTH Network, Inc. subsidiary.

In 2009, the network came under the ownership of America One Television Network, Inc. due to a shareholder buyout from USFR Media Group.

In 2010, America One Television Network merged with B2 Broadcasting to create the holding company One Media Corp, Inc., which America One & B2 Broadcasting then became subsidiaries of, while retaining their respective brand identities.

According to its press release in 2013, it broadcast "5500 live and exclusive events, over 100 U.S. Colleges, 70 professional sports teams and hundreds of top professional leagues from Asia and Europe."

It was reported in September 2014 that One Media Corp had sold America One to Center Post Networks, LLC, owner of Youtoo TV. The sale was finalized in the spring of 2015, with Center Post Networks merging the two networks, which replaced both networks by YTA TV. The sports assets were not included in the merger, as they had been spun off to One World Sports and then to Eleven Sports Network in 2017.

Former America One logo

== Programming ==
America One aired a mix of entertainment and US & international sports programming in prime time. Cooking, travel, news shows, and classic movies made up the network's daytime programming. The network also encouraged the preemption of four hours per day of its programming for local sports, entertainment, or news.

== America One Sports ==
America One held the U.S. broadcast rights to the Ontario Hockey League, Australian Football League, the USAR Hooters Pro Cup, certain ECHL games, and playoffs in the Indoor Football League. America One syndicated many of these broadcasts to various regional sports networks in the US (usually, those not part of the Fox Sports Net family). America One also carried tape-delayed broadcasts of the English Premier League, specifically Bolton Wanderers and Everton, and the American Hockey League's all-star game. America One also showed Midwest-based Victory Fighting M.M.A. Usually, those events were on tape delay.

In 1999, America One broadcast NWA Wildside pro wrestling.

America One had broadcast rights to several rugby league organizations. From 2010 the predominantly Britain-based Super League matches were shown live (rights to that league have since transitioned to Fox Sports 2 (then called Fuel TV) in 2013) in addition to Australasia's National Rugby League games. They also showed the American National Rugby League Grand final.

Historically, America One had a longstanding partnership with the Canadian Football League that lasted through much of the 2000s. This partnership ended before the 2010 season when the NFL Network took over U.S. broadcast rights; as of 2014, ESPN holds those rights.

In 2012, America One became the first American network to broadcast a Nippon Professional Baseball (NPB) game (Hiroshima Toyo Carp home game) on tape delay.

== One Media Corp ==
From 2010 to 2015, it was owned and operated by One Media Corp, based in Dallas, Texas, which also operates

- One CNNXT, a broadband transport company
- B2 Broadcasting, a premier provider of reliable and secure international high-definition television transport and pay-per-view broadcasting service

== See also ==
- YTA TV
- One World Sports
- Independent News Network
