= Theater Television Network =

American television network

- Type: Broadcast television network
- Country: United States
- Launch date: 1951
- Dissolved: 1953

The Theater Television Network was an early American television network founded in 1951. The network was not a traditional 1950s television network: unlike the other TV networks that operated at that time, Theater Network programs were not broadcast into homes; instead, they aired at participating movie theaters.

The Theater Television Network, like many current theaters do for major events, broadcast mostly sporting events: NCAA basketball games, boxing matches, and entertainment events. TTN however also broadcast public affairs programming. The network broadcast Harry Truman's 1951 State of the Union address.

Theater Television required special equipment to be installed at the Theater. After this initial cost, the content could be transmitted over the air or through telephone cables. There were drawbacks to both systems. Theater owners pressed the FCC for bandwidth in the UHF spectrum but this was either resisted or given in short-term periods. The alternative was to use AT&T cable, which was expensive and limited the quality of the output.

From 1948 to 1952, the FCC imposed a ban on issuing licenses for new TV stations. This was the window of opportunity for Theater Television. However, once the freeze was over many new TV stations were established, and the public preferred "free" TV in their living rooms. The last Theater Television operation finished in 1953.
