= Digi-TV =

Defunct digital multicast TV network

- Type: Digital multicast television network
- Country: United States

Programming
- Language: English
- Picture format: 720p HDTV master feed; (downscaled to 480i (SDTV) on over-the-air affiliates)

Ownership
- Owner: Net X Holdings, LLC

History
- Launched: September 27, 2021; 4 years ago
- Closed: August 1, 2022; 4 years ago

Digi-TV was an American digital multicast television network owned by Net X Holdings, LLC that was launched on September 27, 2021. Initially launched in 30 television markets, its programming consisted of general entertainment, knowledge, reality and lifestyle shows imported from Australia, Canada and the United Kingdom. Along with its availability on broadcast TV, it was also available via streaming video and Roku.

The network ceased broadcasting on August 1, 2022, with the website shutting down two days later.

== Programming ==
Programming on the network included:

- Bear's Wild Weekend
- Biz Kid$: Young Entrepreneurs
- Blue Heelers
- Britain's Best Bakery
- Celebrity Island with Bear Grylls
- City Homicide
- Country House Rescue
- Country House Rescue Revisited
- The Gadget Show
- Great British Menu
- The Great Interior Design Challenge
- Garden Rescue
- The Island with Bear Grylls
- The Island with Bear Grylls UK Celebrity
- James Martin Comforts
- Midsomer Murders
- Obsessive Compulsive Cleaners
- Perfect
- The Renovators
- The Restoration Man
- Wild Treks
