= Robert A. Schuller =

American television evangelist

- Born: October 7, 1954 (age 71); Blue Island, Illinois, U.S.
- Employer: Robert Schuller Ministries
- Children: 4, including Bobby Schuller
- Father: Robert Schuller

Robert Anthony Schuller (born October 7, 1954) is an American author, televangelist and pastor. He is the only son of Crystal Cathedral founders Robert H. Schuller and Arvella Schuller. Dr. Robert A. Schuller was the Senior Pastor of the Crystal Cathedral and the Hour of Power T.V. program for 3 years, 2006-2008. He joined his father on the international broadcast in 1976 after graduating from Hope College and delivered his first message that same year at the then, Garden Grove Community Church. He was formerly a minister on the Hour of Power weekly television program broadcast from the Crystal Cathedral in Orange County, California. He appeared on the program almost every week from 1976. He was installed as the senior pastor in January 2006 but, according to the Hour of Power website, he resigned as senior pastor on November 29, 2008. He continues his ministry with Robert Schuller Ministries.

== Life and ministry ==
Schuller was born in Blue Island, Illinois and raised in Garden Grove, California until 3rd Grade, when his family moved to Santa Ana where he attended Santa Ana High School. He graduated in 1976 from Hope College in Holland, Michigan, with a bachelor's degree in ancient civilization. He was also employed at the Crystal Cathedral, leading worship services on Sunday evenings, developing a 24-hour prayer group and organizing small group fellowships and appearing on the Hour of Power reading scripture and occasionally preaching. In 1980, Schuller became an ordained minister in the Reformed Church in America, after receiving a Master of Divinity degree from Fuller Theological Seminary in Pasadena, California. He received an honorary doctorate degree from National Hispanic University in San Jose, California in 1996. He received another honorary doctorate from the California Graduate School of Theology in 2008.

Schuller has four adult children. He lives in Newport Beach, California. Schuller's first marriage ended in divorce in 1983 and he married his current wife, Donna, on November 10, 1984.

In 1981, Schuller founded Rancho Capistrano Community Church in San Juan Capistrano, California, where he served as senior pastor for over 20 years.

From 1995 to 2000, Schuller hosted a one-hour live coast-to-coast radio show. The program revolved around health and wellness and featured a number of guest stars, including Larry King, Robert Atkins, and Elizabeth Dole.

On October 25, 2008, his father announced that Schuller had been removed from the Hour of Power television program, citing "a lack of shared vision". In a prepared statement, founder Robert H. Schuller stated that "different ideas as to the direction and the vision for this ministry" with his son "made it necessary ... to part ways in the Hour of Power television ministry". It was subsequently announced on November 29, 2008, that Schuller had resigned from his position as senior pastor of the Crystal Cathedral.

== Business ==
Chris Wyatt and Schuller founded Comstar Media Fund, LP in 2008 to develop interactive technologies and purchase media properties during the financial crisis. Within six months, the fund had purchased two nationally distributed cable television networks (American Life and FamilyNet) as well as FamilyNet Radio. Shortly thereafter, the company founded Youtoo Technologies, LLC to continue to invent and patent groundbreaking technologies. In 2011, Comstar Media Fund, LP was rebranded Youtoo Media Fund, LP and the company launched the world’s first interactive TV network, Youtoo TV. Since 2011, the fund has divested both cable networks and is focused on monetizing the patent portfolio and interactive technologies.

== Books ==
- Schuller, Robert A, ed. (1981), Life Changers, F.H. Revell.
- Schuller, Robert A, ed. (1984), Be an Extra Ordinary Person in an Ordinary World, F.H. Revell.
- ——— (1986), Getting Through the Going Through Stage, Thomas Nelson.
- ——— (1987), Power to Grow Beyond Yourself, F.H. Revell.
- ——— (1988), World's Greatest Comebacks, Thomas Nelson.
- ——— (1989), Strength for the Fragile Spirit, Thomas Nelson.
- ——— (1990), Just Because You're on a Roll… Doesn't Mean You're going Down Hill, F.H. Revell.
- ——— (1993), Dump Your Hang-Ups: Without Dumping Them on Others, F.H. Revell.
- ——— (1995), What Happens to Good People When Bad things Happen to Them, F.H. Revell.
- ——— (1997), In Search of Morality, F.H. Revell.
- ——— (2000), Possibility Living, Harper San Francisco.
- ——— (2007), Walking in your own Shoes, Faith Word.
- ——— (2007), God's Answer for Your Physical, Financial and Spiritual Health, Hour of Power.
- ——— (2008), Power for Life Bible, Thomas Nelson.
- ——— (2008), Where Jesus Walked, Hour of Power.
- ——— (2009), Leaning into God When Life is Pushing You Away, Faith Word.
- ——— (2012), When You're Down to Nothing, God is up to Something, Faith Word.
