= Cable Video Store =

American cable pay-per-view TV service

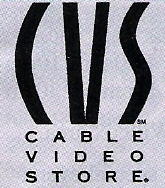
- Type: Cable pay-per-view television service
- Country: United States
- Area: Nationwide
- Owner: General Instrument (1986–92); Graff Pay-Per-View (1992–97)
- Launch date: October 1, 1986; 39 years ago
- Dissolved: May 1997; 29 years ago

Cable Video Store (CVS), was a pay-per-view (PPV) service that was launched on October 1, 1986 by American Cablesystems. General Instrument developed the specialized set-top box that was used to deliver the service, called The Jerrold system. Mark Graff, Founder and President of Graff Pay-Per-View, later purchased CVS. Cable Video Store consisted of one channel which carried first run movies and specials (however, it did not carry major sporting events, such as boxing) on a PPV basis. They also offered low cost programs to buy along with the standard PPV fare.

CVS went off the air in May 1997 as the result of other pay-per-view services such as Viewer's Choice (now known as In Demand) and Request TV that provided multi-channels of PPV and the launching of Video on Demand on many cable systems.

== See also ==
- Request TV
- In Demand (formerly known in the US as Viewer's Choice)
- List of United States pay television channels
