= William Bernard =

William Bernard may refer to:

- William Bernard (sailor) (fl. 1849), sailor known as the notorious "Barnacle Bill" of American yore
- William Bayle Bernard (1807–1875), American-born London playwright and drama critic
- William Larkins Bernard (1843–1922), English architect
- William Smyth Bernard (1792–1863), Irish politician

== See also ==
- Billy Bernard (born 1991), Luxembourger international footballer
- Will Bernard, American guitarist and band leader
