= In Demand =

American cable television service

- Country: United States

Ownership
- Owner: Comcast; Cox Communications; Charter Communications; (33.3% each)
- Parent: iN DEMAND L.L.C.
- Sister channels: Too Much for TV; Hot Choice

History
- Launched: November 27, 1985; 40 years ago
- Closed: July 31, 2025; 15 months ago
- Former names: Viewer's Choice (1985–1999)

In Demand (stylized as iN DEMAND) was an American cable television service which provided video on demand services, including pay-per-view. Comcast, Cox Communications, and Charter Communications (with former independent companies Time Warner Cable and Bright House Networks) jointly operated the service.

== History ==
Viewer's Choice logo from 1985 to 1999.

The origins of the service (unrelated to Canada's Viewers Choice) began in 1978, with the interactive television experiment in Columbus, Ohio, Warner-Amex Satellite Entertainment's QUBE system. Viewer's Choice started as one of ten channels on QUBE, with its name arising from the service presenting viewers one of five films to be aired on the channel with their QUBE remotes, though at that time, it was a multiple choice by viewer vote of which film would air on the channel space, rather than a selection of films. Viewer's Choice expanded with QUBE as the service launched in additional cities. Warner satellite-linked their QUBE systems, and Viacom, partnered at the time with Warner-Amex with the merger of their competing pay television services, Showtime/The Movie Channel Inc., joined the venture, adding Viewer's Choice to their own cable systems and eventually becoming the pay-per-view selection of channels under its eventual traditional concept.

The QUBE project ended in 1985, due to financial losses, resulting in the sale of the Warner-Amex assets to Viacom. The pay-per-view arm was split off from the rest of the Warner-Amex assets (which became known as MTV Networks) and instead was placed under the Showtime/TMC division. The service was launched nationally via satellite to cable companies in six states on November 27, 1985, with one channel of pay-per-view content, still under the Viewer's Choice name. A second channel, utilizing cassette tapes delivered to cable operators, was also available; this eventually evolved into Viewer's Choice II in 1988, which was later rebranded and refocused as the Hot Choice service. In 1989, Group W Satellite Communications bought a 50% stake in Viewers' Choice and Request TV.

Also in 1988, VC merged with a competing PPV service, Home Premiere Television, a joint venture of multiple cable companies. The service (which Viacom disassociated its stake in) retained the Viewer's Choice name, but utilized HPT's legal name, Pay-Per-View Network, Inc., until the rebrand to In Demand. Viewer's Choice continued to expand in the 1990s as it acquired other pay-per-view systems, along with cable companies deciding to outsource their pay-per-view systems rather than maintain them internally. As a result of this, as well as its various competitors being discontinued including Cable Video Store and Request TV, the Viewer's Choice name was gradually removed from on-air reference towards the end of the decade, generally only being referred to as "pay-per-view" in promos, on-screen graphics and voiceovers; the name remained in on-screen copyright graphics and on listings services such as the Prevue Channel until late 1999, when it was eventually renamed "PPV1".

Aside from Hot Choice, VC also operated four channels of programming under the brand of Continuous Hits; it offered one movie at all times of the day for a week-long period, as opposed to the mix of films, sports and events found on the main Viewer's Choice network. Originating in May 1990, as a two-year test provided by Warner Bros., only available in certain areas, such as Comcast's Philadelphia cable systems, and fed by tapes delivered to cable headends, the service was expanded in February 1993 to a satellite-fed nationwide service, with two more Continuous Hits channels launched that summer. This brand was discontinued along with the Viewer's Choice brand itself in 2000, with the Continuous Hits channels becoming additional In Demand channels.

On January 1, 2000, the service was renamed and rebranded to In Demand; the logo was rendered as "iNDEMAND" with all of its letters except the beginning "I" capitalized. This was done to take advantage of the "i-prefix" product naming trend of the time, as cable companies launched complementary cable broadband services to tie into In Demand's rebranding. The rebranding was telegraphed as early as April 1999, when the schedules and offerings of their analog and digital services were consolidated. The first program upon relaunch was Rave Un2 the Year 2000, a New Year's Eve concert performed by Prince, which was filmed several weeks prior.

== Service overview ==
In addition to Hollywood films and a limited selection of adult films, along with live and recorded concert programming, the service mainly distributed ring sports through pay-per-view, including the events of the WWE, All Elite Wrestling, Total Nonstop Action Wrestling and its forerunners, and independent circuits such as those with lucha libre. It also distributed out-of-market sports packages such as MLB Extra Innings, NBA League Pass, MLS Direct Kick, NHL Center Ice where provided (and formerly distributed ESPN Full Court/ESPN GamePlan until they were merged as ESPN College Extra in 2015), along with Too Much for TV, a service which featured "uncensored" content from the series of American Television Distribution and NBCUniversal Television Distribution's tabloid talk shows until they were moved to the freely-available Nosey. It was the former distributor of Howard Stern's Howard TV component of his self-titled SiriusXM radio show until 2013. The UFC ended their relationship with all traditional wireline pay-per-view providers with UFC 235 (including In Demand), choosing to go with a new distribution model through ESPN+, which became its exclusive pay-per-view provider by April 2019. Until they departed the boxing business in 2023, both TVKO/HBO PPV and Showtime carried pay-per-view fights though In Demand.

From this network's first inception, the first main Viewer's Choice/In Demand channel (usually labeled as "IN1" or "PPV1" starting in 2000), signed off weekday mornings from 8 AM to 11 AM (Eastern Time) to feed promotions of upcoming movies and events of the next month to its headend affiliates. By the 2010s, the promotions were sent via file transfers and cloud storage to its providers, but In Demand retained this business day timeslot where few events and films would be ordered a couple days through the month for routine maintenance windows.

In Demand's logo from 2000 until 2014.

In 2010, In Demand began providing a free video on demand service, Vutopia, offered on Time Warner Cable and Bright House Networks. The service offered uncut older movies organized in themes. It was discontinued on June 1, 2015.

By early 2012, as cable providers used more channel bandwidth for high-definition, video-on-demand and broadband services which did not require starting films at several intervals on several channels, providers such as Spectrum and Xfinity removed most of In Demand's linear channels, beyond one to three standard-definition and one high-definition channel for mostly event programming, from their public channel lineups. At its peak, In Demand featured up to 34 standard definition and 19 high definition channels. In Demand shut down its last three linear English-language film-only channels on May 31, 2016, though a Spanish-language channel of rotating films, events and specials continued to be featured alongside the service's remaining event channels.

== PPV.com ==
On December 3, 2021, PPV.com was launched as an app/digital media player option to view In Demand's live ring sports content, along with replays of purchased content, with Kiswe providing the video backbone. The app does not require a cable subscription to view or bill event purchases.

== Discontinuation and sale to Fandango Media ==
On May 10, 2024, In Demand CEO Dale Hopkins released an internal memo that In Demand was beginning to transition its operations back to Cox, Comcast, and Charter internally by the end of 2025, and that In Demand would be discontinued within eighteen months, along with its associated channels, with the departure of both Showtime and HBO from sports broadcasting at the end of 2023, and the decline of wireline pay-per-view services due to the continued success of streaming video services, as most ring sports events became available through traditional streaming services without additional cost as part of their regular package. PPV.com remains in operation to provide cable and IPTV operators a venue for their services as wireline services are transitioned to fully IP-based video distribution.

Regular programming on In Demand's remaining four channels (consisting of the main "event channel" HD service, a downscaled SD event channel, one HD channel with various specials and concerts, and a Spanish channel in SD featuring both events and specials) were discontinued nationwide at 11:59 ET on July 31, 2025, with its website also closing at the same time and only showing a placeholder image of In Demand's logo.

On August 13, 2025, Comcast/Warner Bros. Discovery subsidiary Fandango Media (which several months later would see its Comcast interest spun off to Versant) announced that they had acquired PPV.com and In Demand's channel spaces to expand their Fandango at Home digital video and streaming service. Live events continue to air on PPV.com and In Demand's former linear channels.

== See also ==
- Hot Choice (sister network)
- Request TV
- Cable Video Store
- List of United States pay television channels
