= Request TV =

Pay-per-view TV service

- Request Television Logo from 1990 to 1996
- Type: Cable Pay-per-view television service
- Country: United States

Ownership
- Owner: Liberty Media and Twentieth Century Fox

History
- Launched: November 1985; 40 years ago
- Closed: June 30, 1998; 28 years ago

Request TV, also known as Request Television, is a defunct pay-per-view service owned by Liberty Media and Twentieth Century Fox that was launched in November 1985. Request TV was originally owned by Reiss Media Enterprises; Group W Satellite Communications later purchased a 50% stake in the service in May 1989. Twentieth Century Fox and Liberty Media acquired a combined majority interest in Reiss Media Enterprises in June 1992, and bought out Group W's stake in Request TV.

One of their logos while they operated consisted of the letter "q" in Request as a film reel with a film strip coming out. Request TV offered first run movies and specials such as concerts, wrestling, boxing, etc. Request TV ended broadcasting on June 30, 1998, after Tele-Communications Inc., then-owned by co-parent Liberty Media (owners of the competitive premium services Starz and Encore), declined to renew its contract to carry the service beyond that date.

One of the major highlights of Request TV was that it was the first national television outlet to run Extreme Championship Wrestling programming, as documented by Paul Heyman in the DVD The Rise and Fall of ECW.

== See also ==
- In Demand (formerly known in the US as Viewer's Choice)
- Cable Video Store
- List of United States cable and satellite television networks
