= National College Television =

Defunct American television network

Campus Network's NCTV logo

National College Television (NCTV) was an advertiser-supported program network that serviced over 300 college and university television stations. Founded in 1981, the network distributed a schedule of specialized programming to college students. At one point, they claimed a student audience of 7,000,000. The network stopped operations in the Spring of 1990.

In 1985, they were one of the first in the world to use TV touch-screen interactive displays used by university students, staff, and others.

== Programming ==
- Audiophilia - NCTV's music concert series spotlighted popular artists of the day.
- Adult Cartoons — From the archives of the Museum of Cartoon Art, this show featured classic 1920s-1940s cartoons, as well as new animation and international selections.
- Campus America - newsmagazine (national, produced out of NCTV offices), with hosts Marilyn Freeman and Batt Johnson
- Healthy State- studio-based health show (national, produced out of NCTV offices)
- General College - college soap opera that began in 1987 as a student production at the University of North Carolina at Chapel Hill.
- Jack Fist, P.I. — A comedy film noir detective show set in the 1940s, broadcast in black and white. Columbia University.
- Mad Dog Cartoons – a later rebranding of Adult Cartoons, adding live hosting by a hillbilly-style comic and his bulldog.
- New Grooves - billed as "the most progressive mix of music videos anywhere" this show was hosted veteran DJ Meg Griffin, and the playlist was based on reported airplay from over 150 college radio stations.
- The Spike Jones Show - rebroadcasts of the classic 1950s series starring Jones and The City Slickers.
- Talk is Cheap - Weekly television interview show hosted by Marilyn Freeman (national, produced out of NCTV offices)
- Uncensored - a documentary series exploring issues of the day.
- The Walter Winchell File - featured crime stories from the 1950s TV show featuring the newspaper columnist.
- Off The Cuff - sketch comedy series produced by the University of North Carolina at Chapel Hill.
- Null & Void - sketch comedy series produced by UUTV at Syracuse University.
- Good News, Bad News - sitcom set in a campus newspaper run by the students. Produced by UCLA.
- The Roommate Game - A tribute to the Newlywed Game, this American University produced game show where roommates were asked a set of questions about their off set roommate, who then returned to answer the same questions. Those with the same answers gained points and won prizes. Sandy Silverman was the initial host. The show was criticized for being somewhat risque among some more conservator NCTV member campuses.
- College Dating Club - Another game show hosted by Sandy Silverman. Two "babes" would choose from two "Dudes" the remainder of which was the "reject for the day." The show ran only the last season of NCTV in the spring of 1990.
