= The Auto Channel =

First Interactive Multimedia Automotive Web site Debuted January 1995

The Auto Channel (TACH) is an American automotive and transportation themed digital network and Internet entity that was founded in 1995. TheAutoChannel.com is based in Louisville, Kentucky and the television network is based in Sacramento, CA. Specific topics covered include new and used vehicles, motor homes and recreational vehicles, hot rods and specialty vehicles, motorcycles, motor sports, repair and maintenance, marine and boating, aviation and space exploration, mass transit and railroading.

TheAutoChannel.com is the Internet's largest privately owned automotive information resource, containing more than one million pages of content and thousands of video and audio files. It also encompasses Buyers Guides By Brand, EV-Motoring, RVmotoring.com, NewCarBuyersGuide.com, UsedCarBuyersGuide, PerfectNewCarMatch.com, and PennySaverNetworks.com.

The Auto Channel network uses video content produced exclusively for the TACH websites as well as content that the company produced for outside networks such as Comcast Sports Net. TACH TV programming also includes shows produced by external producers.
