= Florida Knowledge Network =

Educational television service in Florida, United States

- Type: television network
- Country: United States
- Availability: Florida
- Owner: Florida Department of Education
- Dissolved: July 1, 2011
- Official website: floridaknowledgenetwork.org

The Florida Knowledge Network (FKN) was an educational television state network operated by the Florida Department of Education. The channel was seen statewide via the digital subchannels of most Florida Public Broadcasting Service (PBS) member stations and nationwide on the AMC 3 satellite FTA (K_{u} band, Transponder 18).

FKN was seen weekdays from 6AM to 6PM ET (sometimes to 7PM for special faculty programming), with no broadcasts on public holidays. On most stations, The Florida Channel was seen when FKN is not broadcast.

FKN broadcast instructional programming for use by grade school classes, produced by the Florida DOE, as well as programming contributed by PBS member stations, county school boards, the Annenberg Foundation and other outside sources. Programming could be seen live with the class, or taped for later viewing; block feeds of selected programs were regularly given during broadcast hours for the latter.

The channel is not to be confused with the Florida Education Channel, a similar statewide education channel produced by the Panhandle Area Educational Consortium. In 2018, installed by TBC Integration at WFSU-TV, the DVB-S2 uplink system was used to broadcast The Florida Channel, The Florida Knowledge Network and other television broadcast services. On July 1, 2011, the Florida Knowledge Network ceased operations, for reasons not given.
