= WWE Network (Canada) =

Canadian television channel

- Broadcast area: Canada

Ownership
- Owner: TKO Group Holdings (Endeavor)
- Parent: WWE (distributed in Canada by Rogers Sports & Media)

History
- Launched: August 12, 2014; 12 years ago
- Closed: January 2, 2025; 22 months ago

Links
- Website: WWE Network

WWE Network was an English language specialty television channel programmed by American-based professional wrestling promotion WWE, a subsidiary of TKO Group Holdings and distributed to Canadian television service providers by Rogers Sports & Media. Its programming consisted entirely of the linear feed offered as part of the WWE Network video streaming service.

Due to WWE's international distribution agreement with Netflix coming into effect, the Network ended operations on January 2, 2025.

== History and distribution ==
On July 31, 2014, Rogers Communications announced a ten-year agreement with WWE, making Rogers the exclusive distributor of WWE programming in Canada through 2024. In addition to Rogers' Sportsnet 360 retaining exclusive rights to WWE's weekly programming (excluding certain reality series aired at the time by E! and its Canadian counterpart), Rogers secured the Canadian distribution rights to WWE Network, a streaming service that had launched in the United States the preceding year which included live access to the promotion's monthly pay-per-view events.

Rogers initially launched what it called a "preview" of WWE Network on August 12, 2014, using a dedicated channel within the existing Sportsnet PPV licence, similar to how Rogers initially distributed the Sportsnet World service. The channel was initially offered on a subscription basis on Rogers Cable and, according to Rogers, had been offered to all other cable, satellite, and IPTV service providers across Canada. Rogers has indicated that other providers had shown interest in carrying the channel, but that negotiations were ongoing and might "take some time".

Meanwhile, Rogers sponsored an application by WWE to the Canadian Radio-television and Telecommunications Commission (CRTC) to add the American-produced WWE Network linear channel as a non-Canadian programming service authorized for distribution, which would ultimately replace the Rogers-operated PPV channel. This application was published on September 10, 2014, and was open for public comment until October 10.

Rogers' agreement allowed it to control how the WWE Network would be distributed in Canada, and the company said it would not immediately make it available on an over-the-top (OTT) basis, requiring subscribers to go through a service provider such as Rogers. However, Rogers did not rule out making it available via OTT in the future.

On November 26, 2014, the CRTC approved adding the WWE Network to the list of non-Canadian programming services authorized for distribution. Rogers confirmed that the WWE Network service that it proposed to distribute in Canada would broadcast the same content as that broadcast by the WWE Network service in the United States and that the service would complement its other offerings, such as various sporting programs on Sportsnet 360 and live events on pay-per-view.

On December 17, 2014, the network launched on Eastlink, making it the first provider other than Rogers to carry it. On February 12, 2015, Rogers announced a carriage agreement with Cogeco, Shaw, Vidéotron and Telus. It launched for Telus TV, Videotron, Bell Satellite TV and Bell Fibe TV on February 25, Cogeco Cable on March 24, and Shaw and Shaw Direct on March 17.

As of March 9, 2015, those who have subscribed to the WWE Network, via a cable or satellite provider, can now access it through the over-the-top streaming service; this ability was slowly rolled out across providers. In late 2015 SaskTel began carrying the WWE Network.

In 2021, WWE began to phase out WWE Network by selling exclusive rights to its content to other streaming services on a per-country basis, including Peacock in the United States. However, Rogers' contract remained in force, and on October 1 of that year, WWE Network became available as a standalone subscription in Canada through Rogers' Sportsnet Now over-the-top streaming platform, later renamed Sportsnet+.

On January 23, 2024, WWE announced that the global rights to its weekly series Raw, and rights to all other programming (including content currently associated with the WWE Network) outside the United States, would move to Netflix in stages starting the following year. Netflix and WWE confirmed that the Canadian rights to Raw would move in January 2025—aligning with Rogers' contract having been previously announced as ending in 2024, and suggesting that other Canadian rights would move at the same time.

In early September 2024, several Canadian TV service providers posted notices to their websites indicating that WWE Network would no longer be offered on their services after December 31, with one provider specifically citing a notice from Rogers Sports & Media that it would be ending distribution at that time. This change was directly confirmed by Rogers later in the month while the direct-to-consumer version offered through Sportsnet+ would also cease operations at the same time. On December 22, 2024, Rogers entered a multi-year deal with Total Nonstop Action Wrestling to replace its WWE programming on its platforms. Program schedules indicate the channel formally ceased operations on January 2, 2025 at 6:00am EST after an airing of WrestleMania Rewind, though the position had already been replaced by a closure notice slate on many providers on January 1.

== Programming ==
While operating under the Sportsnet PPV licence, the WWE Network channel itself carried approximately 20 hours of programming each day, seven days a week, drawn directly from the American streaming service's linear channel. The subscription also included access to a video on demand library with a limited number of offerings, accessible via cable set-top box (somewhat similar to the former WWE Classics on Demand package), but did not initially provide access to the Internet-based on-demand library.

Following the formal approval of WWE Network as an approved foreign channel, the linear channel's full 24-hour programming day was made available. Canadian subscribers were eventually able to start accessing the streaming service online on the WWE website and app through provider-authenticated access, then later, the Sportsnet Now (later Sportsnet+) app and website.

== See also ==
- New Japan Pro Wrestling World
- Professional wrestling in Canada
