= Manny Pacquiao vs. Timothy Bradley III =

Boxing match

The Legacy Fight
- Date: April 9, 2016
- Venue: MGM Grand Garden Arena, Paradise, Nevada, U.S.
- Title(s) on the line: vacant WBO International welterweight title

Tale of the tape
Boxer	(Philippines) Manny Pacquiao	(United States) Timothy Bradley
Nickname	"Pac-Man"	"Desert Storm"
Hometown	General Santos, South Cotabato, Philippines	Palm Springs, California, U.S.
Pre-fight record	57–6–2 (38 KO)	33–1–1 (13 KO)
Age	37 years, 3 months	32 years, 7 months
Height	5 ft 5 1/2 in (166 cm)	5 ft 6 in (168 cm)
Weight	145 1/2 lb (66 kg)	146 1/2 lb (66 kg)
Style	Southpaw	Orthodox
Recognition	WBO/The Ring; No. 2 Ranked Welterweight; TBRB; No. 1 Ranked Welterweight; The Ring No. 7 ranked pound-for-pound fighter 8-division world champion	WBO; No. 1 Ranked Welterweight; TBRB; No. 2 Ranked Welterweight; The Ring; No. 4 Ranked Welterweight; The Ring No. 9 ranked pound-for-pound fighter 2-division world champion

Result
- Pacquiao wins via 12-round unanimous decision (116-110, 116-110, 116-110)

Manny Pacquiao vs. Timothy Bradley III, billed as The Legacy Fight, was a professional boxing contested on April 9, 2016, for the WBO International championship.

Pacquiao knocked Bradley down twice and outpointed him throughout the fight, winning by unanimous decision after all three judges scored the bout in his favor, 116-110.

== Background ==
It was held at the MGM Grand Garden Arena in Las Vegas on HBO PPV. Pacquiao claimed this fight would be his last professional bout, however, he has fought seven times since. The winner of the bout would be awarded a Special WBO commemorative title belt, which billed the "Legacy Belt".

=== National Anthem Singers ===
- United States (The Star-Spangled Banner) – Trent Harmon
- Philippines (Lupang Hinirang) – The First Word Choir

=== Referee and judges ===
Tony Weeks served as the referee in the ring whilst the judges who scored the bout were Burt Clements (Las Vegas), Dave Moretti (Las Vegas) and Steve Weisfeld (New Jersey).

== Fight Recap ==
Pacquiao began the fight as the "aggressor", though Bradley dodged most of Pacquiao's major shots during the opening rounds. By midway through the fight, both fighters had traded blows, with Rounds 5-8 being very even. Pacquiao knocked Bradley down twice over the fight, in Rounds 7 and 9, ultimately helping Pacquiao secure his 58th professional win by unanimous decision with all three judges scoring it 116–110.

According to CompuBox, Pacquiao landed 28% [122/439] of his punches thrown and 46% of his power punches thrown [92/201], in comparison to Bradley's 33% [99/302] of punches landed and 40% [87/218] of power punches landed.

=== Official Scorecards ===
Judge	Fighter	1	2	3	4	5	6	7	8	9	10	11	12	Total
Burt Clements	Pacquiao	10	9	10	10	9	10	10	9	10	10	10	9	116
	Bradley	9	10	9	9	10	9	8	10	8	9	9	10	110
Dave Moretti	Pacquiao	9	10	9	10	10	10	10	9	10	10	9	10	116
	Bradley	10	9	10	9	9	9	8	10	8	9	10	9	110
Steve Weisfeld	Pacquiao	10	9	9	10	10	10	10	9	10	10	9	10	116
	Bradley	9	10	10	9	9	9	8	10	8	9	10	9	110

== Aftermath ==
After the match, Pacquiao said, "As of now, I am retired" and later shared "I'm going to go home and think about it. I want to be with my family. I want to serve the people." He was also recognized as the TBRB champion.

On August 6, 2017, Bradley officially announced his retirement from professional boxing after nearly 12 years in the sport.

== Fight card ==
Confirmed bouts:

Weight Class		vs.		Method	Round	Time	Notes
Welterweight	(Philippines) Manny Pacquiao	def.	(United States) Timothy Bradley	UD	12	—	WBO International & Lineal Welterweight titles
Super Middleweight	(Mexico) Gilberto Ramírez	def.	(Germany) Arthur Abraham (c)	UD	12	—	WBO Super Middleweight title
Featherweight	(Mexico) Oscar Valdez	def.	(Russia) Evgeny Gradovich	TKO	4/10	2:14	WBO NABO Featherweight title
Super Lightweight	(United States) Jose Ramírez	def.	(United States) Manuel Perez	UD	10	—	WBC Continental Americas Super Lightweight title
Preliminary bouts
Lightweight	(United States) Devin Haney	def.	(Puerto Rico) Rafael Vazquez	UD	4	—
Light Heavyweight	(Ukraine) Oleksandr Gvozdyk	def.	(France) Nadjib Mohammedi	KO	2/10	2:06	WBC NABF Light Heavyweight title
Welterweight	(Lithuania) Egidijus Kavaliauskas	def.	(Germany) Deniz Ilbay	UD	8	—
Super Middleweight	(Germany) Leon Bauer	def.	(Russia) Ilshat Khusnulgatin	UD	6	—
Welterweight	(Russia) Konstantin Ponomarev	def.	(United States) Brad Solomon	SD	10	—	WBC NABF Welterweight title

== International broadcasting ==
Country	Broadcaster		
Country	Free-to-air	Cable	Pay-per-view
Australia	—N/a	—N/a	Main Event
Canada	—N/a	—N/a	Canal Indigo (Vidéotron); SaskTel PPV; Shaw PPV; Sportsnet PPV (Rogers); Vu! (Bell)
Germany	Sat.1	—N/a	—N/a
Indonesia	tvOne	—N/a	—N/a
New Zealand	—N/a	—N/a	SKY Arena
Panama	RPC-TV	—N/a	—N/a
Philippines	GMA Network	Solar Sports	Solar All Access
Thailand	Channel 7	—N/a	
United Kingdom	—N/a	Premier Sports	—N/a
United States	—N/a	—N/a	HBO PPV

Preceded by vs. Floyd Mayweather Jr.	Manny Pacquiao's bouts 9 April 2016	Succeeded by vs. Jessie Vargas
Preceded by vs. Brandon Ríos	Timothy Bradley's bouts 9 April 2016	Retired
