= Floyd Mayweather Jr. vs. Manny Pacquiao =

2015 professional boxing match

Battle for Greatness
- Date: May 2, 2015
- Venue: MGM Grand Garden Arena, Paradise, Nevada, U.S.
- Title(s) on the line: WBA (Unified), WBC, WBO and The Ring welterweight titles

Tale of the tape
Boxer	Floyd Mayweather Jr.	Manny Pacquiao
Nickname	Money	Pac-Man
Hometown	Grand Rapids, Michigan, U.S.	General Santos, South Cotabato, Philippines
Purse	$180,000,000	$120,000,000
Pre-fight record	47–0 (26 KO)	57–5–2 (38 KO)
Age	38 years, 2 months	36 years, 4 months
Height	5 ft 8 in (173 cm)	5 ft 5 1/2 in (166 cm)
Weight	146 lb (66 kg)	145 lb (66 kg)
Style	Orthodox	Southpaw
Recognition	WBA (Unified), WBC, and The Ring welterweight champion WBA (Super), WBC, and The Ring light middleweight champion The Ring No. 1 ranked pound-for-pound fighter 5-division world champion	WBO welterweight champion The Ring No. 3 ranked pound-for-pound fighter 8-division world champion

Result
- Mayweather wins via unanimous decision (118–110, 116–112, 116–112)

Floyd Mayweather Jr. vs. Manny Pacquiao, billed as the Fight of the Century or the Battle for Greatness, was a professional boxing match between undefeated five-division world champion and WBA (Unified), WBC, and The Ring welterweight champion Floyd Mayweather Jr. and eight-division world champion and WBO welterweight champion Manny Pacquiao for the unified world welterweight championship. It took place on May 2, 2015, at the MGM Grand Garden Arena in Paradise, Nevada. Mayweather Jr. won the contest by unanimous decision, with two judges scoring it 116–112 and the other 118–110. Despite being one of the most highly anticipated sporting events in history, the fight was widely regarded as underwhelming by critics and fans alike upon its broadcast.

Despite predictions that Mayweather–Pacquiao would be the highest-grossing fight in history as early as 2009, disagreements between the two professional boxers' camps on terms for the fight prevented the bout from coming to fruition until 2015. The failure to arrange the Mayweather–Pacquiao fight was named the 2010 Event of the Year by The Ring. Serious negotiations were kickstarted in 2014 by an unlikely source: a Hollywood waiter and part-time actor, Gabriel Salvador, made a key introduction between Pacquiao's trainer and confidant Freddie Roach and CBS President Les Moonves, who both worked to facilitate the match. By 2015, negotiations for the fight had been finalized, with all of the major issues that prevented the fight from happening in the past resolved, including purse split, drug testing, and location.

The fight was televised through a pay-per-view (PPV) jointly produced by HBO and Showtime, the respective rightsholders of Pacquiao and Mayweather. In the Philippines, the fight was also broadcast in simulcast across three of the country's major broadcast television networks. The fight was expected to be the most lucrative in the history of professional boxing: with an initial estimate of 4.4 million purchases, the PPV alone broke revenue records in the United States (U.S.) with $410 million in revenue, making it the highest-grossing PPV in history, surpassing Mayweather–Álvarez in 2013. By September 2015, the figure had been amended to 4.6 million. The broadcast of the fight in the Philippines was watched by nearly half the country's households. Due to the record high price of the PPV, the fight was also widely broadcast through unauthorized online streams on services such as Periscope.

Despite the large amount of hype that surrounded it, critics felt that the bout itself was disappointing, primarily citing Mayweather's defense-oriented strategy in the ring and Pacquiao's difficulty in landing punches on Mayweather. This had led to some critics re-labelling the fight "Better Never Than Late" rather than "Fight of the Century". It was later revealed following the event that Pacquiao had sustained an undisclosed injury to his right shoulder while training and that while it had healed in time for the fight, he re-injured it during the fourth round. Further controversy emerged when it was revealed that prior to the fight, Mayweather had been administered IV fluids cleared by the United States Anti-Doping Agency (USADA) through a retroactive "therapeutic use exemption"—an exemption, however, not authorized by the Nevada State Athletic Commission (NSAC).

== Background ==
On June 6, 2008, Floyd Mayweather announced his retirement from boxing, six months after defeating Ricky Hatton by a tenth-round technical knockout. At the time, plans were in motion for a rematch with Oscar De La Hoya on September 20, 2008, Mayweather having defeated him the previous year by split decision. "This decision was not an easy one for me to make as boxing is all I have done since I was a child," Mayweather said. "However, these past few years have been extremely difficult for me to find the desire and joy to continue in the sport." At the time of his retirement, the 31-year-old Mayweather had an unblemished professional record of 39 wins and no losses, and was ranked by The Ring as the No. 1 pound-for-pound fighter in the world, with Manny Pacquiao at No. 2.

During Mayweather's brief retirement, Pacquiao earned superstar status in much of the Western world with his eighth-round technical knockout victory over Oscar De La Hoya, for which he moved up two weight classes from lightweight to welterweight (135 pounds to 147 pounds), and cemented his place as the new pound-for-pound No.1.

On May 2, 2009, the day of Pacquiao's fight against Ricky Hatton, Mayweather announced that he was coming out of retirement and would fight Juan Manuel Márquez, The Ring lightweight champion and No. 2 pound-for-pound fighter, on July 18, 2009, in a welterweight non-title fight. Márquez had previously fought Pacquiao on two occasions: they fought to a 12-round draw on May 8, 2004, and Pacquiao was awarded a 12-round split decision win on March 15, 2008. Mayweather played down Pacquiao's newfound stardom at his press conference, stating: "If he wins tonight, don't be all shocked ... Cause guess what? I beat (Hatton) when he was undefeated. Pacquiao beat Oscar, it don't matter. Going down to 147 pounds was too much for (De La Hoya), he was dead after the first round. ... When you talk boxing, you talk Floyd Mayweather."

Pacquiao would go on to defeat Hatton by a second-round knockout to win The Ring junior welterweight title. The win made him the second boxer in history to win titles in six weight divisions, the first being Oscar De La Hoya.

Mayweather vs. Márquez was postponed until September 19, 2009, due to a rib injury suffered by Mayweather. Despite being out of the ring for 21 months, Mayweather looked as sharp as ever and dominated the fight, winning by a lopsided 12-round unanimous decision. After the bout, Mayweather Promotions CEO Leonard Ellerbe stated that a fight with Pacquiao was the "next obvious choice from a marketing standpoint."

On November 14, 2009, Pacquiao stopped Puerto Rican star Miguel Cotto in round 12 to win the WBO welterweight title, becoming boxing's first ever seven-weight world champion. Pacquiao's victory sparked a media frenzy and fans were quick to demand a fight between him and Mayweather to determine the best fighter in the world.

=== First negotiations ===
On December 5, 2009, ESPN reported that Pacquiao signed a contract to fight Mayweather on March 13, 2010. Shortly afterward, Pacquiao denied ever signing a contract to fight Mayweather, telling FanHouse, "There are still some things that need to be negotiated." On December 11, Golden Boy Promotions sent an eight-page contract to Top Rank, proposing a 50–50 financial split for a fight to take place on March 13, 2010. The contract was very detailed, including such matters as who would weigh-in first (Pacquiao), who would enter the ring first (Pacquiao) and who would be introduced first (Mayweather). The contract included an HBO PPV showing at a cost of $59.95. Billing was to be "Mayweather vs. Pacquiao, presented by Top Rank, Golden Boy Promotions, Mayweather Promotions, and M-P Promotions in association with [approved sponsors and the site]." Also included in the contract was Olympic-style drug testing. Venues for the fight being discussed were Cowboys Stadium in Arlington, Texas, the MGM Grand Garden Arena in Las Vegas, and the Superdome in New Orleans.

In a video titled "Boxing Legend Freddie Roach Updates Us On Pacquiao" uploaded to YouTube on December 11, 2009, Pacquiao's trainer, Freddie Roach, revealed the first hint about Mayweather's request for Olympic-style drug testing, telling roving reporter Elie Seckbach, "I hear negotiations are a little shady. (Richard) Schaefer and them are unhappy about something. They want Olympic-style drug testing. I said, 'Yeah, no problem.' I said, 'Whatever you want.' Since we accepted that, now they're running scared again."

On December 13, 2009, Pacquiao's adviser, Michael Koncz, said Mayweather's request for Olympic-style drug testing was a laughing matter and they had no concerns whatsoever about it. "Our reaction is, 'So what?' We know Manny doesn't take any illegal drugs or anything. And none of this is getting under Manny's skin or anything. I'm here with Manny, and to him, it's like a joke. It's a laughing matter," said Koncz.

After reports had surfaced that both parties had agreed to all terms, Golden Boy Promotions released a press release on December 22, 2009, revealing that Pacquiao was unwilling to comply with the Olympic-style drug testing requested by Team Mayweather. The following day, Bob Arum, Top Rank founder and CEO, declared the fight was off and Pacquiao would be facing a different opponent. "We appeased Mayweather by agreeing to a urine analysis at any time, and blood testing before the press conference and after the fight. Mayweather pressed for blood testing even up to the weigh-in. He knew that Manny gets freaked out when his blood gets taken and feels that it weakens him. This is just harassment and, to me, just signaled that he didn't want the fight," Arum told David Mayo of the Grand Rapids Press.

Not long after declaring that the fight was off, Arum had a change of heart and offered Mayweather a 24-hour take-it-or-leave-it deadline to accept Team Pacquiao's terms for drug testing. Top Rank sent out a press release explaining their position on Mayweather's request for random Olympic-style drug testing. In it, Arum said Pacquiao was willing to submit to as many random urine tests requested, but as far as random blood tests were concerned, he was only willing to subject himself to three tests: one in January, one 30 days from the bout (no later than February 13) and immediately after the fight. "Let's be very clear on the real issues we differ on. It's not about being tested ... It's about who does the testing and the scheduling of the procedures ... The United States Anti-Doping Agency (USADA) cannot do it because they will not amend its procedures to accommodate the blood testing schedule we have outlined. USADA, under its guidelines, would have the right to administer random blood tests as many times as they want up to weigh-in day and that is ludicrous," Arum explained. Freddie Roach told Lance Pugmire of the Los Angeles Times on December 22, 2009, that he would prefer for Pacquiao to give his final blood sample a week before the bout and no later than 72 hours before.

On December 28, 2009, video from an episode of HBO's Pacquiao–Hatton: 24/7 surfaced on the internet showing Pacquiao giving blood in the weeks leading up to his May 2, 2009, bout with Ricky Hatton. Documents confirmed that the video was recorded on April 8, 2009, 24 days prior to the fight and past the 30-day cut-off date that Pacquiao had demanded for a Mayweather fight. Pacquiao filed suit in U.S. District Court in Nevada on December 30, 2009, against Floyd Mayweather Jr., Floyd Mayweather Sr., Roger Mayweather, Mayweather Promotions, and Golden Boy Promotions executives Oscar De La Hoya and Richard Schaefer, alleging that they made false and defamatory statements accusing him of taking performance-enhancing drugs.

Both sides agreed to enter into mediation on January 7, 2010, in hopes of coming to an agreement on the blood testing issue. Retired federal judge Daniel Weinstein, who successfully resolved a prior dispute between Top Rank and Golden Boy Promotions, would again act as mediator. Two days later, after hours of negotiating during mediation, Arum declared that the fight was officially off after Mayweather refused to agree to a 24-day cut-off date. Mayweather revealed that he offered a 14-day cut-off date to Team Pacquiao, but it was rejected.

Leonard Ellerbe declared on January 18, that random blood and urine testing will be implemented in all of Mayweather's future fights, regardless of the opponent. On February 13, in an exclusive interview with David Mayo of The Grand Rapids Press, Mayweather said, "I gave him [Pacquiao] a chance, up to 14 days out. But my new terms are all the way up to the fight. They can come get us whenever, all the way up to the fight, random drug test. That's what it is."

After the failed negotiations, both boxers moved on to other fights. On March 13, 2010, Pacquiao defeated Joshua Clottey via unanimous decision and on May 1, 2010, Mayweather beat Shane Mosley, also by unanimous decision.

=== Reported second negotiations ===
On May 13, 2010, Bob Arum announced that he had penciled in November 13, 2010, as the date of Pacquiao's next fight, possibly against Mayweather. Pacquiao was quoted by the Manila Bulletin on May 20, as saying, "As long as they're not getting a large amount of blood, I am willing to give out blood as close to two weeks before the fight." On the same day, Mayweather revealed that he would be taking off the rest of 2010 and possibly 2011.

Arum declared on June 30, 2010, that there were no longer any issues and the decision was up to Mayweather. "That's all been resolved," Arum stated to Kevin Iole of Yahoo Sports regarding the dispute over random blood and urine drug testing. Arum would also tell the Las Vegas Review-Journal, "There's no longer any issues....The question is whether Mayweather is willing to fight this year." He would reiterate that comment to the Manila Bulletin, stating, "It's now up to Mayweather if he wants to fight."

On July 13, Arum issued a July 16 midnight deadline for Mayweather. "Mayweather has until the end of the week. He could wait until the last minute. If it's Friday [July 16] and it's 11 p.m., and he says we have a deal, we have a deal," Arum would explain to Dan Rafael of ESPN. On July 15, Top Rank's website unveiled an official countdown to the deadline entitled "Money" Time: Mayweather's Decision.

=== Denial of second negotiations ===
As soon as the deadline for Mayweather's response expired, Arum held a conference call. Arum revealed to the media that the negotiations he had been referring to consisted of a series of conversations with HBO Sports President Ross Greenburg. He also revealed that there was no actual direct communication with any representative from Team Mayweather or Golden Boy Promotions. "I had a couple of conversations with Ross [Greenburg] and I laid out all the terms that would be acceptable to our side and I also informed him about the concession that Manny had made regarding drug testing. He got back to me in a couple of weeks and told me that he had had discussions with Al Haymon, representing Floyd Mayweather, and that everything looked good and we were nearing a resolution," Arum explained. During a Q & A session following his opening statement, Arum further explained, "We have never talked to anybody on the Mayweather side and all conversations on our part were through Ross Greenburg and he reported on all conversations on the Mayweather side from Al Haymon."

On July 19, 2010, Ellerbe denied that negotiations ever took place and said nothing was ever agreed on. "Here are the facts: Al Haymon, Richard Schaefer and myself speak to each other on a regular basis and the truth is no negotiations have ever taken place nor was there ever a deal agreed upon by Team Mayweather or Floyd Mayweather to fight Manny Pacquiao on November 13. Either Ross Greenburg or Bob Arum is not telling the truth, but history tells us who is lying," stated Ellerbe. Three days later, Schaefer backed Ellerbe's statement that negotiations never took place.

Regarding comments he made suggesting that contracts for the megafight were close to being finalized, De La Hoya told BoxingScene.com on July 26, "I think I said it because I get the question asked so many times that, obviously, I was fed up and tired of it and I just said like, yeah, yeah, it's gonna get made. So it was a quick answer that I should have obviously thought about. But, obviously, negotiations weren't going on. Nothing was going on."

Also on July 26, Greenburg released a statement saying he had been negotiating with a representative from each side since May 2, "I had been negotiating with a representative from each side since May 2, carefully trying to put the fight together. Hopefully, someday this fight will happen. Sports fans deserve it," Greenburg revealed in a prepared statement sent out to select members of the media. Schaefer again supported Ellerbe's denial of negotiations and challenged both Greenburg and Arum to take lie detector tests. "I think it's unfortunate that Ross made that statement. I fully stand behind the statement I made. I have not negotiated with Ross and I am not aware of any negotiations that have taken place," Schaefer told ESPN.

=== Continued disputes ===
On September 2, 2010, Mayweather unleashed a profanity-filled racist internet rant against Pacquiao via Ustream. He was quoted as referring to Pacquiao as "a yellow chump" amongst other derogatory and racist comments such as, "Once I stomp the midget, I'm going to make the motherfucker make me a sushi roll and cook me some rice" as well as referencing eating cats and dogs. The following day Mayweather apologized. "I want to apologize to everybody. ... I don't have a racist bone in my body, you know. I love everybody," Mayweather said. "I was just having fun. I didn't really mean it, nothing in a bad way."

The failure to make the Mayweather-Pacquiao fight was named The Ring magazine Event of the Year for 2010.

On July 8, 2011, ESPN reported that Pacquiao was willing to agree to random drug testing—but not by USADA. "We have agreed in the Pacquiao camp to unlimited random testing done by a responsible, neutral organization," Arum told Yahoo!. "We don't believe USADA is a neutral organization. I don't think anybody's test is as vigorous as the test administered by the Olympic Organization. And we can arrange for the Olympic Organization to handle the test under the supervision of the Athletic commission respective of the state where the fight is going to be held." However, the following day, Pacquiao's top adviser, Michael Koncz, stated that Pacquiao had never agreed to testing all the way up to fight day. "Will we give blood five days, seven days before the fight? You know, that's something I have to talk to Manny about, but we have nothing to hide," Koncz said.

On January 20, 2012, Mayweather spoke directly to Pacquiao via telephone. "He ask about a 50/50 split," Mayweather said. "I told him no that can't happen, but what can happen is you can make more money fighting me then [sic] you have made in your career." Mayweather offered to pay a flat fee of USD 40 million for a proposed fight but would not allow Pacquiao to share in the revenue. Pacquiao said, "I spoke to Floyd ...and he offered me an amount. He didn't talk about the pay-per-views here and that's it. I can't agree with that. I told him I agree with 55 and 45 (split)."

Pacquiao appeared on the ESPN program First Take on September 20, 2012, and said he had no problem with the drug-testing issue. "Whatever he wants to do," Pacquiao said. He said he was willing to be tested even on the night of the fight. On September 25, Mayweather and Pacquiao reached a confidential settlement in their federal defamation case. In a statement released through the mediator in the case, the Mayweathers said they "wish to make it clear that they never intended to claim that Manny Pacquiao has used or is using any performance-enhancing drugs, nor are they aware of any evidence that Manny Pacquiao has used performance-enhancing drugs."

The Telegraph reported on December 20, that Mayweather said Pacquiao’s association with promoter Bob Arum is the reason why the bout will not happen. "We all know the Pacquiao fight, at this particular time, will never happen, and the reason why the fight won't happen is because I will never do business with Bob Arum again in life, and Pacquiao is Bob Arum's fighter," Mayweather said.

On January 7, 2014, Fighthype.com published an interview with Mayweather in which he called Pacquiao a "desperate dog" who is chasing a megabout due to his tax problems. In response, Pacquiao challenged Mayweather to a fight for charity. "I challenge him to include in our fight contract that both of us will not receive anything out of this fight," Pacquiao said. "We will donate all the proceeds from the fight—guaranteed prize, should there be any, gate receipts, pay-per-view and endorsements—to charities around the world." He added, "Floyd, if you’re a real man, fight me. Let’s do it for the love of boxing and for the fans. Let’s do it not for the sake of money. Let’s make the boxing fans happy."

== Successful negotiations ==
As reported by at least five major media outlets (USA Today, Los Angeles Times, The Hollywood Reporter, The Wall Street Journal, and the New York Post), serious negotiations leading to success were kickstarted in May 2014 by a very unlikely source: a Hollywood waiter/actor named Gabriel Salvador (Bones, Bluebloods, Rizzoli & Isles, CSI). Salvador forged a friendship with CBS Network President Leslie Moonves when Moonves became a regular at Craig's restaurant in West Hollywood, where Salvador worked part-time as a waiter and where his son Elijah worked out at Freddie Roach's gym. Salvador and Moonves bonded over their mutual love of boxing. CBS is the parent company of the Showtime Network, which had invested heavily in boxing and spent top-dollar on a multi-year deal with Mayweather. Salvador told Moonves that he believed he could make the fight happen if he could get Moonves together with Pacquiao confidant and trainer Roach. Salvador believed he could do so based on his connection to both men and his "unshakeable feeling" that together they could cut through the politicking and power struggles that seemed to have stymied prior negotiations. Moonves agreed that Salvador should approach Roach to make an introduction with a view to making the fight a reality. Eventually, Salvador approached Roach and asked him if he would be willing to meet with Moonves to get the wheels in motion. Roach agreed and asked Salvador to set up a meeting.

The first meeting between Moonves and Roach took place on May 28, 2014, at the Scarpetta restaurant in the Montage Hotel in Beverly Hills, which Salvador attended. Both Roach and Moonves agreed the long-awaited bout had to happen and Roach gave Moonves the green-light to start making things happen. Roach later helped Moonves make peace with Pacquiao promoter Bob Arum. Moonves then brought the warring elements from both boxers' camps together and, with Salvador's help, even arranged meetings at his home. After difficult negotiations, it was not long after that both camps agreed to fight on the night of May 2, 2015. The consensus is that but for Salvador's key introduction, the fight would not have happened. Both Moonves and Pacquiao promoter Bob Arum have confirmed Salvador's pivotal role.

For his role, Salvador maintains that he is a "finder" entitled to a finder's fee. But Salvador has yet to be paid that fee by either CBS or Roach/Pacquiao. The fight grossed more than $600 million, with the television networks taking in more than $400 million and Pacquiao grossing more than $160 million.

On December 12, 2014, Mayweather proposed a May 2, 2015, fight with Pacquiao, citing his indirect frustration at not being able to make the fight happen in the past by stating that Pacquiao had lost to both Juan Manuel Márquez and Timothy Bradley respectively. He also stated that he (Pacquiao) was "not on his level". Mayweather then went on to close his comments with, "Let's make this fight happen for the people and for the fans."

On January 13, Pacquiao agreed to terms for the fight. Bob Arum claimed that now only Mayweather's camp was holding up an official agreement. On January 27, Mayweather and Pacquiao finally met each other face to face for the first time during an NBA game between the Miami Heat and Milwaukee Bucks in Miami. Pacquiao said they exchanged phone numbers and would communicate with each other. Pacquiao's advisor, Michael Koncz, said that the two future Hall of Famers later met at Pacquiao's hotel for about an hour to discuss the pending superfight and work out the remaining issues. Top Rank promoter Bob Arum expressed optimism that the fight could be finalized by Super Bowl Sunday at the soonest and that there would be no further deadlines for the fight, stating that the negotiations are nearly complete. On January 30, TMZ reported that the fight had been agreed upon by both sides and that a formal announcement would be made in the "next couple of days." However, members from both sides, including Bob Arum and Stephen Espinoza, refuted the report, saying that the deal had not been finalized yet and that negotiations on what would be a joint pay-per-view (Showtime–HBO) telecast of the fight were still clearing out the last significant issues before the deal could be finalized.

On February 20, Mayweather announced that the fight was official and a contract had been signed for a fight to take place on May 2, 2015, at the MGM Grand in Las Vegas. The fight was expected to shatter PPV buy records and gross millions of dollars with the ticket prices ranging from $3,500 to $250,000 and the PPV was expected to cost USD 89.95 for SD and USD 99.95 for HD. Boxing experts predicted the match would be the richest fight in boxing history and would generate $300 million.

== Fight card ==
Confirmed bouts:

Weight Class	Weight		vs.		Method	Round	Time	Notes
Welterweight	147 lbs.	Floyd Mayweather Jr. (c)	def.	Manny Pacquiao (c)	UD	12		^{Note 1}
Featherweight	126 lbs.	Léo Santa Cruz	def.	Jose Cayetano	UD	10
Featherweight	126 lbs.	Vasiliy Lomachenko (c)	def.	Gamalier Rodriguez	KO	9/12	0:50	^{Note 2}
Preliminary bouts
Super Middleweight	168 lbs.	Jesse Hart	def.	Mike Jimenez	TKO	6/10	2:13	^{Note 3}
Junior Middleweight	154 lbs.	Chris Pearson	def.	Said El Harrak	UD	10
Junior Middleweight	154 lbs.	Brad Solomon	def.	Adrían Granados	SD	10

^Note 1 For WBA (Super), WBC, WBO, IBO, TBRB, and The Ring unified welterweight titles.
^Note 2 For WBO featherweight title.
^Note 3 For vacant USBA super middleweight title.

== Fight details ==
Floyd Mayweather Jr. vs. Manny Pacquiao for the unified world welterweight championship was held at the MGM Grand Garden Arena in Las Vegas, Nevada. Tickets for the fight went on sale on April 23 after an agreement had been reached over ticket allocation. Only 500 tickets went on sale to the public, priced at $1,500, $2,500, $3,500, $5,000, and $7,500 for the 16,800 capacity MGM Grand. The tickets that went on sale sold out within a minute. As per the contract, the first $160 million of revenue and the revenue above $180 million from the fight was split 60/40 between the fighters, with Mayweather receiving the larger 60% share. Revenue between $160 million and $180 million was to be split 51/49, with the 51% share going to the winner. Both fighters were expected to earn at least $100 million in revenue from their participation. Although the event was jointly promoted by Mayweather Promotions and Top Rank, the contract named Mayweather Promotions as the lead promoter of the fight. Both fighters agreed to undergo drug testing by the United States Anti-Doping Agency, including random blood and urine testing prior to the fight, a test following the fight and a ban from professional boxing for four years if they test positive. Neither fighter has failed a drug test during their professional career.

Kenny Bayless served as the in-ring referee, as chosen by the Nevada State Athletic Commission. Bayless has previously officiated five of Mayweather's past bouts and seven of Pacquiao's and he earned a record $25,000 for officiating this fight. Burt Clements, Dave Moretti and Glenn Feldman served as judges. The U.S. national anthem, "The Star-Spangled Banner", was performed by Jamie Foxx. The Philippine national anthem, "Lupang Hinirang", was performed by Filipino-American singer Gail Banawis, joined by The Word Chorale—a choir of Filipino pastors.

A large number of celebrities were in attendance; singer Justin Bieber was among Mayweather's entourage, while Pacquiao was joined by comedian Jimmy Kimmel—who had discussed the possibility of entering with him when Pacquiao appeared on his talk show Jimmy Kimmel Live. Kimmel wore an outfit parodying Bieber's wardrobe from a pre-fight press conference and photobombed a pre-fight photo taken by Pacquiao. Other figures in attendance included Steffi Graf and Andre Agassi, Beyoncé and Jay-Z, Charles Barkley, Mike Tyson, Clint Eastwood, Robert De Niro, Denzel Washington, Michael J. Fox, Donald Trump, Jake Gyllenhaal, Amir Khan, Drew Barrymore, Jesse Jackson, Russell Westbrook, Mark Wahlberg, Lewis Hamilton, Leonardo DiCaprio, Don Cheadle, Michael Jordan, Sugar Ray Leonard, Paris Hilton, Nicki Minaj, Meek Mill, Ben Affleck, The Jonas Brothers, Michael Keaton, Tom Brady, Magic Johnson, Christian Bale, Bradley Cooper, Evander Holyfield, Mariah Carey, Sting, 50 Cent, and others.

=== Broadcasting ===
As both Pacquiao and Mayweather had exclusive relationships with HBO and Showtime respectively, the telecast of the fight was a joint production between HBO World Championship Boxing and Showtime Championship Boxing. This marked the first collaboration between the two American premium television services since Lennox Lewis vs. Mike Tyson in 2002. It was executive produced and directed by Showtime's David Dinkins Jr. and Bob Dunphy and featured a mix of Showtime and HBO personalities. The lead ringside announcer for the fight was Jim Lampley (HBO) and he was joined by analysts, Al Bernstein (Showtime) and Roy Jones Jr. (HBO). Max Kellerman (HBO) and Jim Gray (Showtime) covered the locker rooms of Pacquiao and Mayweather, respectively. James Brown (Showtime) hosted the pay-per-view broadcast with Paulie Malignaggi (Showtime) and Lennox Lewis (HBO) serving as expert analysts at the host desk. Harold Lederman (HBO) and Steve Farhood (Showtime) were the unofficial scorers, and both fighters had their own personal ring announcer: Jimmy Lennon Jr. (Showtime) introduced Mayweather, while Michael Buffer (HBO) made the main ring announcements while introducing Pacquiao.

The broadcast was, in most regions, distributed as a pay-per-view event. In the United States, the PPV cost was USD 89.95 (with an additional $10 charge for HD), a 40% increase over the PPV cost of Mayweather's 2013 fight against Canelo Álvarez. Rights to screen the fight in commercial venues such as bars and restaurants were administered by G&G Sports, with costs based upon venue size and other factors, reaching as high as $5,000 for a 257-seat establishment. Due to concerns that they may not have been able to recoup the cost of the PPV through cover charges and drink sales, some bars decided against screening the fight at all. Both HBO and Showtime aired encores of the fight the following Saturday, May 9, 2015.

The two networks broadcast documentary specials focusing on the two fighters as part of the lead-up to the fight; Showtime produced the Mayweather-focused Inside Mayweather vs. Pacquiao—with three episodes focusing on Mayweather's preparations for the event and an epilogue which aired the week following the fight, while HBO aired a one-hour Pacquiao-focused Mayweather/Pacquiao: At Last, the thirty-minute analysis special Mayweather/Pacquiao: The Legends Speak, and encores of previous Pacquiao fights. CBS Sports Network (a sister to Showtime via CBS Corporation) also aired supplemental programming, including encores of Inside Mayweather vs. Pacquiao and past Mayweather fights, live coverage of the weigh-in, special broadcasts of The Doug Gottlieb Show and Boomer and Carton from Las Vegas, and coverage of the post-fight press conference.

==== International broadcasting ====
In Pacquiao's native country of the Philippines, Solar Entertainment held broadcast rights to the fight, reportedly paying $10 million (PHP 440 million). The telecast was made available via commercial free pay-per-view on the television providers Cignal and SkyCable, and at the locations of theatre chain SM Cinema (including IMAX theaters) and the Mall of Asia Arena. Unlike previous Pacquiao fights, whose free-to-air rights were held by GMA Network as part of a sub-licensing arrangement, a "slightly-delayed" telecast of the fight was simulcast by Solar Sports, GMA, ABS-CBN, and TV5. Solar Sports President Wilson Tieng said that Pacquiao personally requested the joint broadcast due to its historic nature, and that "everybody agreed to set aside all their differences to make sure that this will become the biggest event ever in Philippine television history." GMA held exclusive radio rights to the fight.

In Europe, generally, the fight was broadcast via PPV (Austria, United Kingdom, Germany, Denmark, Sweden, Norway, Finland, Spain). Only a few TV holders in Europe decided otherwise – TVP (Poland), Sport 1 (Czech Republic and Hungary), and Discovery Italy (Deejay TV and DMAX). Sky Sports Box Office won exclusive television rights in the UK to the bout, and produced a four episode broadcast leading up to the event titled Mayweather vs. Pacquiao: Countdown.

Sportsmax TV and Cleeng offered the fight via PPV in 19 Caribbean countries, including Barbados, Jamaica, Surinam, and Trinidad and Tobago.

International broadcasters
Country	Broadcaster
Albania	SuperSport
Argentina	TV Pública
Argentina	GOLDEN
Australia	Main Event
Austria	Sky Select
Belgium	Be TV Sport
Brazil	Canal Combate PPV
Brazil	ESPN Brasil
Cambodia	CTN
Cambodia	CNC
Canada	Various pay-per-view providers including: Canal Indigo (Videotron); Sportsnet PPV (Rogers); Shaw PPV; Vu! (Bell)
Chile	TVN
Chile	GOLDEN
China	CCTV-5
Colombia	RCN TV
Colombia	GOLDEN
Croatia	Nova TV
Czech Republic	Sport 1
Denmark	Viaplay PPV
Ecuador	GOLDEN
Fiji	Sky Pacific PPV
Finland	Viaplay PPV
France	Ma Chaîne Sport
Germany	Sky Select
Hong Kong	Now TV
Hungary	Sport 1
Iceland	Stöð 2 Sport
Ireland	Sky Box Office
India	Sony SIX
Indonesia	tvOne
Israel	Sport 1
Italy	Deejay TV
Japan	WOWOW Prime
South Korea	SBS
South Korea	SBS Sports
Malaysia	HBO
Mexico	Televisa
Mexico	Azteca
New Zealand	Sky Arena
Nicaragua	Canal 4
Norway	Viaplay PPV
Panama	RPC-TV
Peru	Latina
Philippines	Solar All Access (PPV/Live)
Philippines	Solar Sports (Cable/Slightly delayed)
Philippines	GMA Network (Free TV/Slightly delayed)
Philippines	ABS-CBN (Free TV/Slightly delayed)
Philippines	TV5 (Free TV/Slightly delayed)
Poland	TVP1
Poland	TVP Sport
Portugal	CMTV
Puerto Rico	Claro TV PPV
Romania	Pro TV
Romania	Dolce Sport
Russia	Channel One
Singapore	SuperSports PPV
Slovakia	Sport 1
South Africa	SuperSport
Spain	Taquilla PPV
Spain	Marca.com
Sweden	Viaplay PPV
Thailand	Channel 7
Turkey	Kanaltürk
Ukraine	2+2
Middle East and North Africa	OSN Sports Box Office
United Kingdom	Sky Box Office
United Kingdom	British Military via BFBS Sport
United States	Showtime PPV
United States	HBO PPV
United States	US Military via AFN Sports
Uruguay	Teledoce; GOLDEN
Venezuela	TeleAragua
Venezuela	GOLDEN

==== Piracy and streaming ====
Due to the high profile of the event and the high price of the PPV, there were significant concerns surrounding piracy of the fight's telecast by either bars (which were required to purchase a higher-priced commercial license to televise the event, and were not legally allowed to purchase it through their television provider) or by online streaming services, with TorrentFreak going on to report that Mayweather vs. Pacquiao was "destined to become the most pirated live sports event in history". Organizers were especially concerned about the mobile broadcasting apps Meerkat and Periscope due to their relative ease of use and accessibility, as viewers could simply film their television screen with their phones to make a stream available.

Alongside monitoring activities during the event, actions were also preemptively taken against several sites that advertised plans to illegally stream the fight. In the Philippines, the Philippine National Police's Anti-Cybercrime Group arrested the operator of a streaming service after a complaint by ABS-CBN and was granted a temporary restraining order in a Florida court for its infringements of copyrights and trademarks. HBO and Showtime filed a similar lawsuit against two other streaming services that advertised an intent to offer the fight under 17 U.S.C. § 411 (which allows for preemptive claims of copyright infringement against those conspiring to infringe the copyrights of a broadcast) and a court issued a restraining order against the sites and all parties in "active concert or participation with any of them, including any and all service providers who receive notice of this order". The Electronic Frontier Foundation criticized the wide reach of the order, arguing that the clause of "any and all service providers who receive notice of this order" was comparable to the provisions of the previously proposed Stop Online Piracy Act, theorizing that other parties not originally named could become subject to the injunction by merely receiving notice of the order.

A large number of Periscope streams were used to broadcast the fight, either indirectly with a focus on reactions from viewing parties, or simply rebroadcasting television feeds of the fight. One stream reportedly peaked at around 10,000 viewers, although these streams had inconsistent uptime due either to connection issues or to being reported and taken down by the service. Representatives of both Meerkat and Periscope reported that they acted upon takedown notices received throughout the evening. ESPN's Ryan McGee dubbed Periscope the "winner" of the fight due to the prominence it received through this manner. Dick Costolo, CEO of microblogging service and Periscope parent company Twitter, made a similar remark; although it was initially assumed to be in reference to the illegal streams, he clarified that it was actually in reference to HBO's usage of the service to stream behind-the-scenes from the fighters' locker rooms.

=== Belt ===
The winner of the fight received newly created belts by the WBC and the WBA. The WBC belt, valued at $1 million, is an exact replica of the current belt, except it has thousands of emeralds in place of the gold plating for the center logo. The belt also contains the faces of both Floyd Mayweather Jr. and Manny Pacquiao, along with the faces of the former WBC President, José Sulaimán and boxing legend Muhammad Ali. Two belts were initially made for the WBC. The green emerald belt won the public fan vote over the black onyx belt with a vote of 53% to 47%.

=== Gloves ===
Both fighters wore eight-ounce (230 g) gloves with brands of their choosing. Mayweather wore custom Grant gloves with a multicolored paisley pattern, red & purple trim and the letters TBE (The Best Ever) on the cuff. Pacquiao wore standard red Cleto Reyes gloves with black & white trim. In Pacquiao's third professional loss to Érik Morales, he was forced to use Winning brand gloves the first time around. Pacquiao's complaints were that the gloves felt like "pillows" and they did not give him the same power as his Reyes "puncher's gloves." More recently, Mayweather had glove issues in his first bout with Marcos Maidana, stating that Maidana's Everlast MX gloves did not provide sufficient padding for the knuckles. The issue was later resolved with Marcos Maidana resorting to using Everlast Powerlock type gloves, leaving Maidana's trainer, Robert Garcia, unhappy with the negotiation.

=== Fighters' gear ===
Mayweather's trunks were designed by Dapper Dan, a Harlem-based hip-hop fashion designer. At least five possible outfits were created for the fight. FanDuel, a daily fantasy sports website, acquired sponsorship rights to have their logo appear on his waistband. Pacquiao's gear was provided by Nike.

Mayweather commissioned specially designed mouthguards for the fight by Dr. Lee Gause, owner of Iceberg Guards, costing $25,000. Along with "subtle" clear pairs, some of them contained gold leaf, diamond dust and an embedded $100 bill. Iceberg Guards also released a limited-edition TMT-branded mouthguard to tie in with the fight. Pacquiao's mouthguard was designed by Dr. Ed Dela Vega of Canoga Park, Los Angeles, who has custom-fit mouthguards for Pacquiao and other Philippine boxers. It featured a multi-colored design with a blend of the colors from the flag of the Philippines, meant to represent the different ethnic groups that support him. Unlike Mayweather's, this mouthguard was supplied as a gift to Pacquiao; Vega argued that Mayweather's high-cost mouthguard was simply "hype" meant to "rub it in the face of boxers who can't afford it".

=== Sponsors ===
A bidding war ensued between Corona and Tecate—which had respectively served as prominent sponsors of previous Mayweather and Pacquiao fights—for lead sponsorship rights to the fight. Tecate won the sponsorship deal with a bid of $5.6 million, beating a bid of $5.2 million by Corona. As part of the deal, Tecate's logo was visible on all promotional material for the fight. Pacquiao was expected to feature a number of major sponsorships on his gear, providing an estimated $2.25 million in additional revenue. Among them were long-time sponsors, such as Air Asia, Cafe Puro, and Motolite. Daily fantasy sports service FanDuel acquired sponsorship rights for Mayweather, including waistband branding and a block of tickets that were given away through an on-site sweepstakes. The King, a mascot of fast food chain Burger King, was among Mayweather's entourage entering the arena.

=== Merchandise ===
Prior to the fight, Nike launched a line of Pacquiao-oriented merchandise carrying his logo and the slogans "Do What They Say You Can't" and "#MannyDoes". Demand for Mayweather merchandise was also heavy, including apparel branded under the Mayweather Promotions and The Money Team (TMT) labels amongst others.

From April 24, 2015, through the day of the fight, a MayPac pop-up store operated on the corner of Las Vegas Boulevard and Fremont Street. It sold merchandise for both fighters and featured interactive displays and fan-oriented events.

== Recap ==
In round one, both boxers were aggressive, Mayweather unusually so. Pacquiao attempted to score early points from body shots. However, Mayweather escaped his attack and landed a solid counter strike under Pacquiao's right side. All three judges gave the round to Mayweather. In the second round, Pacquiao repeatedly forced Mayweather toward the ropes, but Mayweather was able to escape or wrap Pacquiao up each time. Pacquiao's jabs mostly missed, but he landed a solid left hand hit late in the round. Mayweather increased his aggression late. Although Harold Lederman of HBO scored this round for Pacquiao, all three judges scored the round in favor of Mayweather.

Early in round three, Mayweather hit Pacquiao low. Pacquiao reacted angrily to the hit, perceiving it as illegal. The fighters exchanged big hits late in the round, energizing the crowd. For the third consecutive round, all three judges scored it in favor of Mayweather. In the fourth round, Pacquiao chased Mayweather around the ring, throwing punches at a rapid pace. Pacquiao scored a big left handed hit, causing Mayweather to put his high guard up against the ropes. Pacquiao took the round on all three scorecards.

Having recovered from Pacquiao's big hit in the previous round, Mayweather won the early exchanges of the fifth round. Pacquiao remained on the offensive, but was unable to land any big punches. Mayweather upped his activity and won the round in the eyes of the three judges. Pacquiao came out aggressive in the sixth, forcing Mayweather to the ropes. Pacquiao successfully landed a couple of combinations, but Mayweather appeared to be unfazed. All the judges gave the round to Pacquiao, making the overall score Mayweather 58–56 (4–2 by rounds) on all cards.

Mayweather changed tactics at the start of the seventh round, becoming the aggressor for a second and forcing Pacquiao on to the ropes. He threw a double jab, then a right-handed punch, landing none, before Pacquiao counterattacked with an unsuccessful combo. Mayweather stayed aggressive in the eighth round, landing jabs that kept Pacquiao off balance. Pacquiao went on the attack, opening up and landing some bigger punches. The round went to Mayweather on the official scorecards.

In the ninth round, Pacquiao was again on the offensive. He effectively landed several punches, but Mayweather also landed on his counters. Both parties landed a number of hits in a late flurry of action that excited the crowd. Pacquiao was active, while Floyd picked his counters. Two of the three judges gave the round to Pacquiao, while the other saw it for Mayweather. The tenth round saw Pacquiao on the attack. Again, two judges saw it for Pacquiao and one for Mayweather. Mayweather led 96–94 (6–4) on two cards and 98–92 (8–2) on the other with two rounds remaining.

Mayweather came out swinging in the eleventh round, landing just below his highest volume of the fight. The action then stalled as Pacquiao struggled to land much on a defensive-minded Mayweather, who ducked the attacks. Pacquiao forced Mayweather to the corner, but Mayweather landed a clean hit on Pacquiao's chin. However, Pacquiao still managed to hit solid punches in a fast pace. The judges unanimously scored the round in favor of Mayweather. In the final round, Pacquiao attempted to attack with Mayweather mostly looking to avoid his punches by running across the ring. Mayweather kept the fight in the center of the ring, but Pacquiao did land some inside counters. All three judges gave the round to Mayweather.

Floyd Mayweather Jr. defeated Manny Pacquiao after 12 rounds by unanimous decision, 118–110, 116–112, 116–112, to remain undefeated in his career. According to CompuBox, Mayweather landed 67 more punches throughout the match, connecting with his punches 34 percent of the time, while limiting Pacquiao to only 19 percent. Only three times did Pacquiao land double figure punches in a round. Pacquiao himself thought he won the fight and continues to maintain that he deserved the decision.

=== Scorecards ===
Judge	Fighter	1	2	3	4	5	6	7	8	9	10	11	12	Total
Burt Clements	Mayweather	10	10	10	9	10	9	10	10	9	9	10	10	116
Burt Clements	Pacquiao	9	9	9	10	9	10	9	9	10	10	9	9	112
Glen Feldman	Mayweather	10	10	10	9	10	9	10	10	9	9	10	10	116
Glen Feldman	Pacquiao	9	9	9	10	9	10	9	9	10	10	9	9	112
Dave Moretti	Mayweather	10	10	10	9	10	9	10	10	10	10	10	10	118
Dave Moretti	Pacquiao	9	9	9	10	9	10	9	9	9	9	9	9	110

== Aftermath ==
=== Revenue and viewership ===
The fight lived up to revenue expectations, generating somewhere between $300 million and $400 million in gross revenue according to early estimates (including announced ticket sales totalling $72,198,500), which would surpass Super Bowl XLIX. Due to the possibility of high demand, viewers were encouraged to pre-order the PPV: an HBO representative reported that the fight had attracted more pre-orders than any other PPV event in the broadcaster's history. Despite the guidance, a high volume of last-minute orders overwhelmed the systems of several major U.S. television providers and resulted in various technical issues, such as difficulties ordering or viewing the PPV and outages that affected unrelated channels as well for some viewers. To address these issues, the main event was pushed back 45 minutes from its originally projected start time of 8:15 p.m. PT (11:15 p.m. ET), to 9:00 p.m PT (12:00 a.m. ET).

The fight broke PPV viewership records in the United States, with 4.6 million buys and over $410 million in revenue, surpassing the previous $150 million revenue record set by Floyd Mayweather vs. Canelo Álvarez, the 2.48 million buy record set by 2007's Oscar De La Hoya vs. Floyd Mayweather Jr. and a pre-fight estimate of $270 million from three million households. In the Philippines, Kantar ratings estimated that the fight was watched across the three-network consortium by 46.9% of Filipino households; of the three networks simulcasting the fight, ABS-CBN had the largest number of viewers, with a rating share of 24%.

Due to hundreds of business jets reaching the ramp-parking capacity, McCarran International Airport was closed for non-airline flights during the event days. By contrast, the typically bustling streets of the Philippine capital Manila were nearly empty during the fight.

=== Post-fight remarks ===
After the fight, Mayweather remarked "[Pacquiao] definitely had his moments in the fight. As long as I moved on the outside, I was able to stay away from those. He’s a really smart fighter ... My dad wanted me to do more, but I had to take my time. Because Manny Pacquiao is a competitor, and he’s extremely dangerous." Mayweather said he would retire after his next fight, the opponent of which is not yet decided. Pacquiao said "I thought I won the fight. He’s moving around. It’s not easy to throw punches when he’s moving around so much ... I thought I caught him many more times than he caught me." Citing the stats that showed he possibly should have won the fight, Pacquiao has continued to maintain he should have been awarded the decision. On the possibility of a rematch, Mayweather stated on May 9, 2015, that he had no plans to fight Pacquiao again "at this particular time", referring to him as being a "sore loser" and a "coward".

=== Pacquiao shoulder injury ===
Hours after the fight, Pacquiao's team disclosed that he had injured his right shoulder in April during a training exercise. The injury was partially healed, but Pacquiao requested and was denied an injection of legal painkillers before the fight. Pacquiao said he re-injured the shoulder in the fourth round of the fight and was ineffective after that. On May 4, a representative of the Nevada State Athletic Commission said that it was looking into why Pacquiao had stated he had no shoulder injuries on pre-fight questionnaire and was considering fining or suspending him for the deception. Pacquiao's team responded with a statement saying the United States Anti-Doping Agency had been informed of the injury, but USADA head Travis Tygart said Pacquiao's team had only asked about the legality of certain substances for use on an unspecified shoulder injury and had provided "no medical information, no MRIs, no documents". Mayweather initially stated that he would be open to the possibility of a rematch with Pacquiao once he had recovered from his shoulder injury, but he changed his mind before talks of a rematch were in the works. Pacquiao later underwent surgery to repair a torn rotator cuff and was out of action for nine months to one year.

=== Mayweather's IV injection ===
After weighing in for the fight on May 1, Mayweather received an intravenous injection for the stated purpose of pre-bout re-hydration. The two IV infusions were administered at his home, amounted to 16% of the total average male blood quantity, and contained saline, multivitamins and vitamin C. The World Anti-Doping Agency (WADA) forbids such a large amount of fluids entering the body before competition as a preventive step against the possible masking of performance-enhancing drug use. Bob Bennett, the executive director of the NSAC, stated that unless the IV was administered at a hospital, it needs to be cleared by filing a therapeutic-use exemption, and supporting documents through the Nevada commission and authorized by the commission’s medical expert. The Pacquiao camp had requested an injection of the anti-inflammatory Toradol for Pacquiao's injured shoulder before the fight, but was denied authorization by the NSAC. USADA authorized both of Mayweather's IV injections, but the NSAC was not informed of them until after the fight.

=== Reception ===
The fight itself left many fans disappointed. Forbes.com contributor Brian Goff called it "arguably, the least entertaining 'mega fight' in memory", attributing the disappointment to Mayweather's defense-oriented strategy, which is atypical of top boxers. The New York Times felt that the bout was "far from electrifying and had some fans grumbling about Mayweather’s methodical defensive style". Los Angeles Times columnist Bill Dwyre felt that the fight was "as compelling as the 405 freeway at 8 a.m.". Regarding Pacquiao's undisclosed shoulder injury, he called the entire situation very damaging to boxing, accusing the fight's promoters of allowing the fight to go on for monetary reasons, and potentially alienating fans. Dwyre went on to say that "This was billed the Fight of the Century. As The Wall Street Journal so aptly put it, it's good that we have 85 years left to top it." Former heavyweight champ Evander Holyfield, who thought that Pacquiao should have been awarded the decision, questioned the judging of not just this fight but recent prize fights in general in an essay in The Players' Tribune.

==== Lawsuits ====
On May 5, 2015, two Las Vegas residents filed a class-action lawsuit against Pacquiao, his manager and Top Rank, for failing to disclose Pacquiao's injury before the fight. The plaintiffs felt that their actions deceived those who bought tickets for the PPV or bet on the fight and violated the rules of the NSAC. In August 2017 a Los Angeles judge threw out the suit alongside other fan suits relating to the injury, though he stated he felt sympathy for fans who felt deceived that Pacquiao didn't disclose his injury. The case was later appealed and in November 2019 the 9th U.S. Circuit Court of Appeals ruled 3–0 to throw out the suit.

In May 2016, Showtime Networks also sued Top Rank over the injury, claiming that the promoter violated an indemnification agreement.

=== Rematch ===
On September 15, 2018, both Mayweather and Pacquiao posted videos on Instagram depicting an encounter between the two at Ultra Japan, speculating the possibility of a rematch. Mayweather's stated in his posting of the video that the fight would happen "this year" and described it as "another nine-figure pay day on the way" and was heard remarking to Pacquiao that he was going to "take [the belt] from you like I did before". In Pacquiao's video (posted with the comment "50–1 #NoExcuses"), Mayweather was heard mentioning the "second of December". It is unknown if any formal negotiations have actually occurred.

On September 19, 2018, Mayweather clarified his calls for a rematch, stating that he planned to hold a fight in Japan first before any possible rematch.

On November 4, 2018, it was announced that Mayweather would fight undefeated Japanese kickboxer Tenshin Nasukawa on New Year's Eve, in a three-round exhibition boxing match. In the one-sided fight, Nasukawa was knocked down three times in the first round and his corner subsequently threw the towel in. The progress for the Floyd Mayweather Jr. vs. Manny Pacquiao fight is felt as a crusade for each side, among the online community of both camps.

On February 23, 2026, it was announced that Mayweather and Pacquiao had agreed to a rematch on September 19, 2026 at the Sphere in Las Vegas. The fight was due to be streamed globally on Netflix. The announcement came days after Mayweather announced that he would be coming out of retirement after his upcoming exhibition fight against Mike Tyson.

The planned rematch was postponed indefinitely on June 26, 2026, with Pacquiao's camp citing legal and financial disputes surrounding Mayweather.

Preceded by vs. Marcos Maidana II	Floyd Mayweather Jr.'s bouts May 2, 2015	Succeeded by vs. Andre Berto
Preceded by vs. Chris Algieri	Manny Pacquiao's bouts May 2, 2015	Succeeded by vs. Timothy Bradley III
Awards
Previous: Carl Froch vs. George Groves II	The Ring Event of the Year; 2015	Next: The death of Muhammad Ali
Records
Previous: Floyd Mayweather Jr. W12 Oscar De La Hoya; 2.4m	Highest pay-per-view bout 4.6m May 2, 2015	Incumbent
