= Viewers Choice =

Eastern Canadian pay-per-view television service

- Viewers Choice logo
- Country: Canada
- Broadcast area: National
- Headquarters: Toronto, Ontario

Programming
- Picture format: SDTV 480i HDTV 1080i

Ownership
- Owner: Viewers Choice Canada Inc. Bell Media (70.06%, direct & indirect); Rogers Media (24.95%); ESPN Inc. (4.99%, indirect)

History
- Launched: September 5, 1991; 34 years ago
- Closed: September 30, 2014; 11 years ago
- Replaced by: Sportsnet PPV

Links
- Website: viewerschoice.ca (archive)

Viewers Choice was a Canadian English language pay-per-view (PPV) and near video on demand service. It was owned by Viewers Choice Canada Inc., which at the time of its closure was majority-owned and managed by Bell Media, with minority partners Rogers Media and ESPN Inc., and had been carried by various cable and IPTV service providers, primarily in Eastern Canada.

Launched in September 1991, Viewers Choice was the first pay-per-view service permitted to operate in Eastern Canada (a counterpart in Western Canada also used the Viewers Choice brand name for several years), and was the sole English-language PPV provider in that region until 1999. However, it shut down on September 30, 2014, as the service's two main owners at the time, Bell and Rogers, had each gained full ownership of a competing general-interest PPV service (Vu! and Sportsnet PPV respectively). Viewers Choice said it would be working with its remaining partner service providers to transition to other pay-per-view services.

== Overview ==
The area shaded in green was Viewers Choice's broadcast area in Eastern Canada, while the white ones were Viewers Choice's broadcast area in Western Canada.

The Viewers Choice pay-per-view service consisted of 45 standard-definition channels and two high-definition channels. Programming included movies, concerts, live combat sport events such as boxing and mixed martial arts (UFC), and live professional wrestling events (WWE, WCW, ECW, and TNA). Pornographic content was also available through the Adam and Eden services. Adam featured content for homosexual men, while Eden featured content of interest to heterosexual men.

Although Viewers Choice (and pay-per-view services in general) continued to be a main provider of big-ticket live events, much of their movie content had been duplicated by video on demand (VOD) services operated by cable and IPTV companies (and as noted below, Viewers Choice was not available on any Canadian satellite provider, from late 2007 to its closure in 2014). As a result, many cable systems had been slowly reducing the number of pay-per-view channels carried.

In an effort to compete with VOD, Viewers Choice launched "All Day Ticket," which allowed customers to purchase a movie for up to a 24-hour time period until 6:00 AM (local time) the next day, and view the movie as many times as they wished until the time period expired.

== History ==
=== Launch as monopoly provider ===
Logo until April 2004.

In March 1991, the Canadian Radio-television and Telecommunications Commission (CRTC) granted a broadcasting licence to Viewer's Choice Canada to operate a regional pay-per-view service serving Eastern Canada (Ontario, Quebec, and the Atlantic provinces). Viewer's Choice Canada was a partnership between Astral Communications with 50.1%, Rogers Pay Per View Inc. (a subsidiary of what is now called Rogers Media) with 24.95%, and TSN Enterprises (part of what is now known as CTV Specialty Television Inc.) with 24.95%.

The service launched on September 5, 1991. Originally, Viewer's Choice was the monopoly provider of pay-per-view service in Eastern Canada, while Western International Communications (WIC) was granted a similar monopoly for its Home Theatre service in Western Canada, mirroring the regions held by Astral and WIC for pay television service (The Movie Network and Superchannel, respectively). However, from 1993 until 2007, Home Theatre operated under the Viewers Choice name and used the same satellite feeds.

=== Entering competition ===
Viewers Choice's monopoly on pay-per-view service in Eastern Canada ended in 1999, when Bell ExpressVu (now Bell Satellite TV) was permitted to launch its own PPV service, Vu!, dropping Viewers Choice in the process. Shortly thereafter, Vu! also began offering pay-per-view service to other service providers, meaning that Viewers Choice was now competing with Vu! for the right to supply cable providers, though on any given service provider only one of these services would be made available to customers.

Shaw Communications purchased Home Theatre (the service branded as "Viewers Choice" in Western Canada) in 2001. By 2006, it was able to switch its licence to a national one; the transition was completed on December 27, 2007, when Shaw Broadcast Services replaced the Viewers Choice-originated feeds with a "PPV"-branded service. This displaced Viewers Choice from Shaw, Star Choice (now Shaw Direct), and any other system receiving its pay-per-view feeds via Shaw Broadcast. As a result of this change, and since the only other satellite distributor (Bell TV) was already offering Vu! instead, carriage of Viewers Choice was restricted to cable systems and other providers able to receive the feeds via terrestrial fibre.

Viewers Choice Canada Inc. was originally the largest shareholder and managing partner (40%) in the French language pay-per-view service Canal Indigo, launched in 1997. However, on March 20, 2008, Groupe TVA announced it would be purchasing the remaining shares in the service from all other shareholders, including Viewers Choice Canada Inc. The CRTC approved the sale later that year.

On March 6, 2012, the CRTC approved Viewers Choice's request to remove its regional restrictions and allow it to broadcast nationally.

=== Acquisition by Bell and shutdown ===
Following Bell Media's 2013 acquisition of Astral, it took control of Viewers Choice, owning a net interest of approximately 70% in the service (through the 50.1% previously owned by Astral, and through 80% ownership of CTV Specialty, which itself owns 24.95% of Viewers Choice). Bell simultaneously maintained full ownership of competing provider Vu!.

In July 2014, industry news website Cartt.ca reported that Bell Media was notifying cable providers that Viewers Choice would be shutting down on September 30, 2014. The notices were issued just after the CRTC renewed the licences for various PPV services, including Sportsnet PPV, a service wholly owned by Rogers (and carried by both Rogers and Cogeco alongside Viewers Choice) which was previously restricted to sports and special events. Under the renewed licences, all PPV providers would be subject to standard conditions of licence permitting a full range of PPV programming including movies, implying that Rogers could use the Sportsnet PPV licence to take full control of the pay-per-view lineup and corresponding revenues on its cable systems, much as Bell and Shaw have already done.

In a later press statement confirming the decision, Bell stated that "[t]he two co-owners of VCC, Bell and Rogers, both have their own pay-per-view services and thus feel there is no need to keep the service operating as a standalone entity", but will work with service providers to ensure a smooth transition to another PPV service.

The Viewers Choice channels left the air between 10:00pm and 12:00 midnight EDT on the evening of September 30, 2014. The final programs scheduled for the various channels included replays of the previous weekend's UFC 178 event; movies, including Winter's Tale, 300: Rise of an Empire, The Quiet Ones, The Grand Seduction, and The Other Woman; and various adult programs. The service's barker channel continued to air previews up until midnight EDT, at which point it began to air a loop of an animated Viewers Choice bumper until eventually shutting down entirely. On December 27, 2014, the channel's license was revoked, 2 months after the channel went off the air.

On that day, the Viewers Choice website was also shutdown, and was replaced with a shutdown message saying "Please note the Viewers Choice Pay Per View is no longer in service. Viewers seeking pay-per-view (PPV) options in Canada should contract their television provider. Thank you for using Viewers Choice Canada!". The shutdown message was used until the website was completely shut down sometime around June 2015.
