= Sportsnet One =

Canadian specialty sports channel

- Sportsnet One logo
- Country: Canada
- Broadcast area: National
- Headquarters: Toronto, Ontario

Programming
- Picture format: 4K (UHDTV); 1080i (HDTV); 480i (SDTV)

Ownership
- Owner: Rogers Sports & Media
- Sister channels: Sportsnet; Sportsnet 360; Sportsnet World

History
- Launched: August 14, 2010
- Former names: Rogers Sportsnet One (2010–2011)

Links
- Website: Sportsnet One

Sportsnet One (SN1 or SN One) is a Canadian English-language discretionary digital cable and satellite specialty channel owned by Rogers Sports & Media; it operates as a national sports channel complementing the Sportsnet group of regional sports networks. In addition to the national feed, the service operates a number of additional part-time "companion channels" which carry programming restricted to the local broadcast territories of the teams involved, such that the main feed remains available nationwide.

As of 2014, Sportsnet One is available in 6.1 million Canadian homes.

== History ==
Former logo as Rogers Sportsnet One, 2010–2011

Licensed by the Canadian Radio-television and Telecommunications Commission (CRTC) in March 2010 under the name Rogers' Mainstream Sports Specialty Service, it was launched at 12:00 p.m. ET on August 14, 2010, as Rogers Sportsnet One in standard definition and high definition. The service was renamed as simply Sportsnet One on October 3, 2011, as part of the rebranding of Rogers Media's Sportsnet-branded channels.

=== Current sports properties ===
When it launched, exclusive content promoted for broadcast on Sportsnet One included selected Toronto Blue Jays games and certain Premier League soccer games. Currently, the channel's featured programming is NBA programming including all 41 of Sportsnet's Toronto Raptors games in addition to other regular-season NBA games including simulcasts of TNT's Thursday-night doubleheader including Inside the NBA. Additionally, the channel serves as a secondary outlet for live events for which Sportsnet owns Canadian rights, but cannot air on its primary regional channels, as well as the main outlet for lower-rated sports such as cycling, as well encores of Sportsnet-produced highlight and studio programming. It is also occasionally used to simulcast national events that are only carried across some of the primary regional channels, due to scheduling conflicts with regional broadcasts.

Sportsnet One has acted as a linear specialty television partner for selected CBC Sports programming, including the Calgary Stampede and the Paralympics since 2014.

The Sportsnet One license is also used for a series of part-time multiplex channels which carry regional National Hockey League coverage, for selected Vancouver Canucks, Edmonton Oilers and Calgary Flames games. The channels themselves are only carried within the respective teams' territories.

== Channels ==
Where available under the NHL's regional broadcast rules (as per the territories listed below), one or more of the companion channels listed below are automatically included at no additional charge to Sportsnet One subscribers and are not available on a standalone basis. Since the revival of the Winnipeg Jets in 2011, regional Flames and Oilers games on Sportsnet Flames and Sportsnet Oilers have been blacked out in Manitoba; as such, cable providers in that province do not carry either channel.

Channel	Launch date	Description and programming
Sportsnet One	August 14, 2010	The primary channel of the Sportsnet One licence, and the national secondary channel of the Sportsnet family of channels.
Sportsnet Flames	October 2010	Part-time companion channel which carries selected regional broadcasts of the Calgary Flames. Available in Alberta, Saskatchewan, Northwest Territories and Nunavut.
Sportsnet Oilers	October 2010	Part-time companion channel which carries selected regional broadcasts of the Edmonton Oilers. Available in Alberta, Saskatchewan, Northwest Territories and Nunavut.

=== Former channels ===
Channel	First air date	Last air date	Description and programming
Sportsnet Sens	October 2010	April 2014	Part-time companion channel which carried selected regional broadcasts of the Ottawa Senators. Was available in eastern Ontario, Quebec and Atlantic Canada. Sportsnet lost rights to regional Senators broadcasts to TSN5 after the 2013–14 season. When Rogers owned the English-language Montreal Canadiens regional broadcast rights, it used its Citytv station CJNT-DT for overflow instead.
Sportsnet Canucks (Formerly Sportsnet Vancouver Hockey)	September 22, 2010	September 2025	Part-time companion channel which carried selected regional broadcasts of the Vancouver Canucks. Was available in British Columbia and the Yukon.

== Carriage ==
Rogers Cable exclusively carried Sportsnet One at launch. On September 15, 2010, Shaw Direct and Shaw Cable added Sportsnet One to their lineups, becoming the first major third-party distributors to do so. Telus Optik TV subsequently picked up the service two days later.

Fans of the Toronto Blue Jays baseball team were vocal in criticism of the choice by Rogers to move a number of games from the four regional Sportsnet channels to the new Sportsnet One. Of particular concern was the timing of the move considering the channel's lack of availability across Canada at its launch, and the perceived strong-arming of Blue Jays fans and the other regional cable companies by Rogers, which owns the team, their stadium, the Sportsnet channels, and Rogers Cable, the latter of which was the only major cable company carrying the channel at launch time. Some fans canceled Blue Jays ticket purchases in protest, but Paul Beeston, the team president, stated he was very happy to be going with Sportsnet One.
