= Viewer's Choice =

Viewer's Choice may refer to:

- In Demand, a US-based pay-per-view service formerly known as Viewer's Choice
- MTV Video Music Award - Viewer's Choice
- Viewers Choice, a Canadian-based pay-per-view service
