= Sportsnet World =

Canadian sport television channel

- Sportsnet World logo
- Country: Canada
- Broadcast area: National
- Headquarters: Toronto, Ontario

Programming
- Picture format: 480i (SDTV); 1080i (HDTV)

Ownership
- Owner: Rogers Sports & Media (Rogers Sportsnet, Inc.)
- Sister channels: Sportsnet; Sportsnet 360; Sportsnet One

History
- Launched: August 10, 2007
- Former names: Setanta Sports (2007–2011)

Links
- Website: Sportsnet World

Sportsnet World is a Canadian English language discretionary digital cable and satellite specialty channel owned by Rogers Sports & Media, a subsidiary of Rogers Communications operating as a national sports channel complementing the Sportsnet group of regional sports networks. The channel was launched on August 10, 2007, as a Canadian version of Setanta Sports as a joint venture between UK-based Setanta Sports and Rogers Media. In 2011, Rogers acquired the stake of Setanta relaunching the channel to its current name.

Sportsnet World primarily airs Rugby Union, Rugby league and association football.

== History ==
The channel was launched as Setanta Sports, in partnership with Ireland-based Setanta Sports, on August 10, 2007, in time for the 2007–08 Premier League season, as a dedicated channel within Rogers' sports pay-per-view service Sportsnet PPV. Although operating under a pay-per-view licence, Setanta acted as a pay television service, with a 24-hour commercial-free schedule, rather than a pay-per-view service where customers are prompted to pay a price for each individual event.

Original Setanta Sports logo, used from 2007 to 2011.

Rogers later applied to the Canadian Radio-television and Telecommunications Commission (CRTC) for a category 2 digital licence which was approved on July 15, 2008, under the name Sportsnet 2.

In mid-2009, Rogers swapped licences for Setanta Sports, from using the pay-per-view licence to the category 2 digital licence, without interrupting service; at which point, the Irish-based Setanta Sports company gained a 33.33% interest in the Rogers subsidiary that owns 80% of the channel, as well as a 20% interest in the channel itself.

In July 2011, Rogers announced that Setanta Sports would be rebranded as part of the Sportsnet family of networks on October 3, 2011, becoming Sportsnet World. The change was intended to allow the channel to be cross-promoted through other Sportsnet properties; the change came alongside a larger, overall rebranding of the Rogers Sportsnet group of channels launched the same day. In preparation for the relaunch, Setanta Sports' minority stake in the channel was sold to another company, MLM Management, and the rights to Setanta programming were maintained by the channel. Despite being branded as a Sportsnet service, it remained a premium channel separate from the Sportsnet regional networks and Sportsnet One. MLM Management's interest in the channel was sold to Rogers in early 2012, giving Rogers 100% interest in the service.

== Programming ==
Sportsnet World features live and recorded events from the following leagues and competitions:

=== Rugby League ===
- Australia: National Rugby League
- United Kingdom: Super League

=== Rugby Union ===
- England: Premiership Rugby

=== Soccer ===
- England: FA Cup, FA Community Shield, FA WSL
- Germany: Bundesliga, Bundesliga 2, DFB-Pokal, DFL-Supercup (2015–2023)

== Sportsnet World HD ==
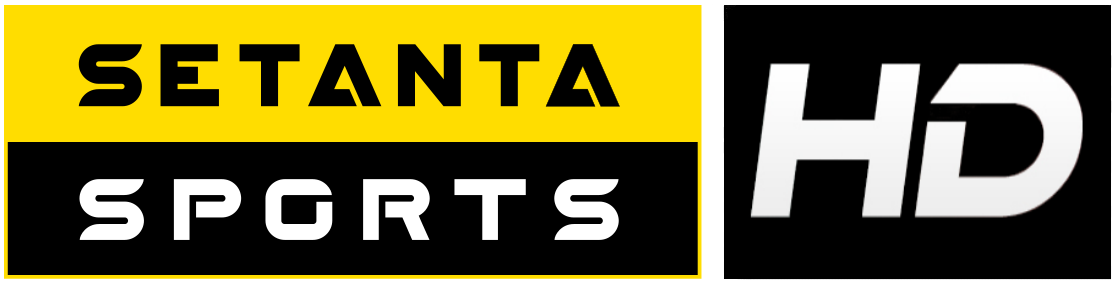
Original Setanta Sports HD logo, used from 2010 to 2011.

Sportsnet World HD logo, used since 2011.

Sportsnet World HD is a high definition simulcast of Sportsnet World's standard definition feed. It was launched on August 1, 2010, as Setanta Sports HD. It was renamed Sportsnet World HD on October 3, 2011, to coincide with the rebranding of Setanta Sports to Sportsnet World.

It is currently available on Bell Satellite TV, Bell Fibe TV, Shaw Cable, Rogers Cable, Eastlink, Bell MTS, Optik TV, SaskTel, Vmedia, Vidéotron and Telus.
