= Canal Indigo =

Canadian pay-per-view TV service

- Country: Canada
- Broadcast area: National
- Headquarters: Montreal, Quebec

Programming
- Picture format: 480i (SDTV); 1080i (HDTV)

Ownership
- Owner: Vidéotron (Quebecor Media)

History
- Launched: August 26, 1996

Links
- Website: canalindigo.com

Canal Indigo is a Canadian English and French language pay-per-view and Near Video on Demand provider owned by Vidéotron. The service was launched on August 26, 1996.

== Channels and content ==
Canal Indigo PPV service consists of 11 standard definition channels and two high definition channels. Programming on Canal Indigo includes movies, concerts, sports, and other special events. Adult content is also available through Canal Indigo's Olé! Télévision service.

== History ==
Logo from 1996 to 2011

Canal Indigo started on August 26, 1996 with eight analogue channels using the Videoway system on Videotron. A few months after the launch of Videotron's digital cable, Indigo was running 39 channels, until January 1, 2005 at 8:41 pm when Indigo experienced a technical bug, leaving nine working channels. On June 1, 2005, Canal Indigo came back with 24 channels. On August 1, 2007, due to the growing popularity of Video On Demand, Canal Indigo was reduced to 12 channels.

Canal Indigo was the monopoly provider of French-language pay-per-view programming in Canada until late 1999, when Bell ExpressVu (now Bell Satellite TV) launched its bilingual Vu! service, replacing Canal Indigo on that provider. On December 27, 2007 Shaw Broadcast switched all of its PPV feeds to its own proprietary PPV service displacing Canal Indigo from Shaw, Shaw Direct and any other system that receives their PPV feeds via Shaw Broadcast.

Viewers Choice Canada Inc., operator of the namesake English-language pay-per-view service, was originally the largest shareholder and managing partner (40%) in Canal Indigo, with Cogeco, Groupe TVA, and TQS Inc. holding minority interests at 20% each. However, on March 20, 2008, Groupe TVA announced it would be purchasing Viewers Choice and the remaining stakeholders interests in the service. The sale was approved by the Canadian Radio-television and Telecommunications Commission (CRTC) on July 18, giving Groupe TVA full ownership of the service. Groupe TVA launched a new 24/7 high-definition channel on November 1, 2008, and removed one SD channel.

On December 1, 2009, the CRTC approved a corporate reorganization that would transfer Canal Indigo from Groupe TVA to fellow Quebecor Media division and cable provider Vidéotron.

In July 2014, Videotron indicated to the CRTC that it intended to change Canal Indigo into a bilingual (English / French) service, due to the planned shutdown of English-language provider Viewers Choice at the end of September 2014. Due to new standard conditions of licence for PPV providers being introduced in 2014, CRTC approval is no longer required to convert from a single-language service to a bilingual one. However, since Videotron operates almost exclusively in French-language markets, the company requested an exemption from the standard requirement for bilingual PPV services which would otherwise require it to operate a minimum of 15 English-language channels and 5 French-language channels, plus a separate barker channel in each language. Under Videotron's original proposal, Canal Indigo would offer at least 8 French-language channels and 2 English-language channels, plus a bilingual barker channel. The application was approved on September 30, on condition that Canal Indigo maintain the same ratio but with a minimum of 3 English-language channels (and thus 12 French-language channels).
