= Fight of the Century (disambiguation) =

The Fight of the Century usually refers to the 1971 Joe Frazier vs. Muhammad Ali boxing match.

Fight of the Century may also refer to:

- the 1910 boxing match between James Jeffries and Jack Johnson
- the 1921 boxing match between Georges Carpentier and Jack Dempsey
- the 1938 boxing match between Joe Louis and Max Schmeling
- the 2009 boxing match between David Tua vs Shane Cameron
- the 2015 boxing match between Floyd Mayweather Jr. and Manny Pacquiao
