= Fibe (Bell Aliant) =

IPTV provider for Atlantic Canada

- Type: Subsidiary
- Industry: Telecommunications
- Area served: Atlantic Canada
- Parent: BCE
- Website: www.bellaliant.ca/bundles/fibreop-bundles

Fibe (formerly FibreOP) is the brand name used by Bell Aliant for its suite of fibre to the home (FTTH) unified communication services, including Internet access, IPTV, and home telephone service, available in much of Atlantic Canada and previously in some regions of Ontario and Quebec. The Fibe service covers an entire urban area with a fibre optic network.

== Fibe Internet ==
Fibe Internet service offers the following stand-alone unlimited speed options: 100 Mbit/s download and 100 Mbit/s upload (now available in a bundle with voice, voice and TV or TV only), 150 Mbit/s download and 150 Mbit/s upload, 300 Mbit/s download and 300 Mbit/s upload, and up to 1 Gbit/s download and 940 Mbit/s upload. In a bundle Bell Aliant offers the following unlimited speed options: 150 Mbit/s download and 150 Mbit/s upload, 500 Mbit/s download and 500 Mbit/s upload, 1 Gbit/s download and 940 Mbit/s upload, upgradable to 1.5 Gbit/s download and 940 Mbit/s upload .

== Fibe TV ==
Fibe TV service offers: 200 SD channels, over 200 HD channels, and over 98 music channels. Bell Aliant has upgraded the middleware of their Fibe TV product to Microsoft Mediaroom. Fibe TV now gives customers access to Whole Home HD and 4K, Whole Home PVR, an extensive Video on Demand library, Next Generation Interactive Program Guide, Restart - the ability to Restart shows aired in the past 30 hours, Wireless TV, A Remote App, GO Apps, and Amazing apps that include such apps as Netflix and Weather Network App.

Fibe TV Key services include:

- Whole Home PVR: a brand name also used by many of Bell Aliant's competitors. It describes a system where all receivers in a household are connected together via a local network. This allows viewers to record, pause and playback content from any room in the house. Fibe TV PVR's can store up to 150 hours of HD (300 hours of standard) content.
- Ability to search for programs by title, cast members, or a simple keyword search. The electronic program guide has 14 days worth of listings and allows viewers to customize the display to show their favourite channels.
- Picture in picture browsing and channel surfing: viewers can watch one channel and browse other channels or channel listings.
- Fibe TV App.
- Fibe TV on Demand: A VOD service with over 1000 titles, including movies & TV series.
- Changing channels happens with virtually no delay compared to satellite service.
- TV based apps such as Facebook, Twitter, Netflix, and The Weather Network
- Crave: A Canadian subscription video on demand service for cable and satellite subscribers.
- English-language premium movie channels: Crave, Super Channel and HBO Canada
- Super Écran: A French-language premium movie service.
- Vu!: pay-per-view
- Trending now.
- Several music stations and Radio Stations.

== Fibe Home Phone ==
Bell Aliant offers Fibe home phone service in much of Atlantic Canada.

== History ==
In late 2009, Bell Aliant launched its FibreOP services with deployment commencing in New Brunswick and was the first in Canada to cover an entire city with fibre to the home (FTTH) technology. Simultaneous deployments followed in Newfoundland and Labrador, Nova Scotia and Prince Edward Island in 2010–2011 with the services available to approximately 1,000,000 homes and businesses by end of 2014. This was an evolution of earlier efforts that saw Bell Aliant predecessor NBTel deploy television services in the Saint John, New Brunswick urban area in the 1990s, followed by a similar deployment in Halifax, Nova Scotia.

On April 15, 2016 Eastlink lost the lead to Bell Aliant for leading Internet Service Provider in Nova Scotia and Prince Edward Island.

On July 19, 2016 Bell Canada stated that its FibreOP TV service available in Atlantic Canada would be integrating with Bell Fibe TV in Ontario and Québec.

On September 6, 2016, Bell announced a change to their Fibe TV service. Beginning in 2017, the company said Fibe TV customers would no longer be required to also sign up for Fibe Internet service in order to access their Fibe TV service. "As we align our next-generation IPTV technologies, we’re bringing exclusive Fibe features to Atlantic Canada and new options for Fibe TV customers in Ontario and Québec," said Wade Oosterman, Bell Group President and Chief Brand Officer.

== Service areas ==
New Brunswick

On July 13, 2009, Bell Aliant announced the beginning of Fibe services in New Brunswick, focusing on Fredericton and Saint John. This was the inaugural deployment of the service in Canada. On February 8, 2010, Bell Aliant announced that it would expand its Fibe services to the following communities in New Brunswick throughout the remainder of 2010: Bathurst, Miramichi, Rothesay, Quispamsis, Grand Bay–Westfield, Moncton, Dieppe, and Riverview.

In June 2011, Shediac and Miramichi were added to the list of deployment communities for Fibe service. Installation to homes and businesses is currently rolling out.

Nova Scotia

On May 28, 2010, Bell Aliant announced the beginning of Fibe services in Nova Scotia, focusing on the following communities in the Cape Breton Regional Municipality with availability by the end of 2010: Sydney, Sydney River, North Sydney, Sydney Mines, Glace Bay and New Waterford. Total cost of this deployment was projected to be $15 million.

On Jan 20, 2011, Bell Aliant announced the continuation of its Nova Scotia Fibe services, focusing on the following communities in the Halifax Regional Municipality with availability by mid-2011: Halifax, Dartmouth, Eastern Passage, Cole Harbour, Lower Sackville, Hammonds Plains, Waverley, Timberlea, Spryfield, Bedford, Head of St. Margarets Bay, Upper Tantallon and Lake Echo. Total cost of this deployment was projected to be $55 million. Although not listed, Fibe is currently being deployed in the Fall River area, as of early November 2011. The service expanded to the Annapolis Valley in early 2022. In May 2023, Citywide Communications and Purple Cow began using Bell Aliant TV Following Eastlink’s loss of Corus channels.

Prince Edward Island

On September 29, 2010, Bell Aliant announced the beginning Fibe services in Prince Edward Island, focusing on availability in Charlottetown, Cornwall, Stratford and Summerside by the end of 2011.

Newfoundland and Labrador

On April 7, 2011, Bell Aliant announced the beginning of Fibe services in Newfoundland and Labrador, beginning with a $22 million build-out in the city of St. John's and surrounding communities on the northeast Avalon Peninsula. In addition to St. John's, Fibe service is available in many areas of the Province.

== Availability ==
As of the end of Q4 2014, Fibe is available to 1 million homes and businesses.

New Brunswick

- Balmoral (2015)
- Bathurst (2010)
- Campbellton (2012)
- Charlo (2015)
- Chipman (2014)
- Dalhousie (2013)
- Dieppe (2010)
- Edmundston (September, 2012)
- Fredericton (2009)
- Grand Bay–Westfield (2010)
- Grand Falls (June, 2012)
- Hanwell (2010)
- Harvey (2019)
- Lincoln (2010)
- Minto (2014)
- Miramichi (2010)
- Moncton (2010)
- Mcadam (2021)
- New Maryland (2010)
- Oromocto (2014)
- Quispamsis (2010)
- Riverview (2010)
- Rothesay (2010)
- Sackville (2022)
- Saint John (2009)
- Salisbury (2014)
- Shediac (June, 2011)
- St. Stephen (June, 2013)
- Sussex (June, 2012)
- Woodstock (July, 2012)

Newfoundland and Labrador

- Bay Roberts (2013)
- Bishop's Falls (2013)
- Carbonear (2013)
- Clarenville (2013)
- Conception Bay South (2011)
- Corner Brook (2012)
- Deer Lake (2014)
- Gander (2012)
- Goulds (2011)
- Harbour Grace (2014)
- Portugal Cove-St. Philip's (2013)
- Grand Falls-Windsor (2012)
- Logy Bay (2013)
- Mount Pearl (2011)
- Paradise (2012)
- St. John's (2011)
- Stephenville (2014)
- Torbay (2013)

Nova Scotia

- Bedford (2011)
- Cole Harbour (2012)
- Dartmouth (2011)
- Eastern Passage (2012)
- Fall River (2012)
- Glace Bay (2010)
- Greenwood (2022)
- Halifax (2011)
- Hammonds Plains (2011)
- Head of St. Margarets Bay (2012)
- Lake Echo (2012)
- Lower Sackville (2011)
- New Waterford (2010)
- New Glasgow (2011)
- New Minas (2022)
- North Sydney (2010)
- Spryfield (2011)
- Sydney (2010)
- Sydney Mines (2011)
- Sydney River (2011)
- Timberlea
- Trenton
- Truro (2011)
- Waverley (2012)
- Upper Tantallon

Prince Edward Island

- Charlottetown
- Cornwall
- Stratford
- Summerside
- Slemon Park
- Miscouche
- Kensington
- O'Leary
- Alberton
- Montague
- Georgetown
- Souris

== Former availability ==
Ontario

Service is no longer offered in Ontario, and is now Bell Fibe, but was previously available in regions such as:

- Cobalt (2013)
- Greater Sudbury (2012)
- North Bay (2013)
- Sault Ste. Marie (2014)
- Sturgeon Falls (2013)
- Temiskaming Shores (2013)
- Timmins (2013)

Quebec

Service is no longer offered in Quebec, and is now Bell Fibe, but was previously available in regions such as:

- Alma (2015)
- Chicoutimi (2015)
- Jonquière (2015)
- La Baie (2015)
- Saint-Felicien (2015)
- Roberval (2015)
- Riviere-du-Loup (2014)
- Thetford Mines (2014)
- Victoriaville (2014)
