= Shaw PPV =

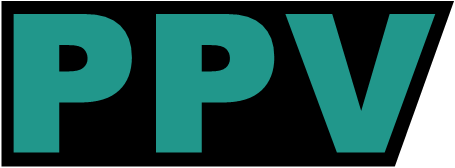
- Shaw PPV logo
- Country: Canada
- Broadcast area: National
- Headquarters: Calgary, Alberta

Programming
- Picture format: 480i (SDTV)

Ownership
- Owner: Shaw Communications

History
- Launched: 1990
- Replaced: Sportsnet PPV
- Closed: 2023
- Former names: Home Theatre (1990-1991); Viewers Choice (1991-2007)

Links
- Website: Shaw PPV

Shaw PPV was a Canadian English and French language pay-per-view service owned by Shaw Pay-Per-View Limited, a division of Shaw Communications. Shaw PPV was carried by Shaw Direct, Shaw Cable, and some other providers, mainly (but not exclusively) in Western Canada.

As the service was carried by a number of cable operators unaffiliated with Shaw, the service uses generic "PPV" branding and avoids references to its ownership on the service itself; however some print and Web advertising for PPV programming on Shaw's cable and satellite services does use the name "Shaw Pay Per View". The French-language channels use the brand TALC (télé à la carte, or "TV by order").

== History ==
The broadcast area (shaded in green) was Shaw PPV's broadcast area, while Viewers Choice operated in Eastern Canada at the time.

In February 1990, Allarcom Pay Television Limited, a subsidiary of Western International Communications (WIC), was issued a two-year experimental licence by the Canadian Radio-television and Telecommunications Commission (CRTC) for a pay-per-view (PPV) service serving Regina, Saskatoon, and Yorkton, Saskatchewan, under the provisional name "Superchannel Main Event". The service was launched later in 1990 under the name Home Theatre. At that time, PPV customers were required to also be subscribers to Allarcom's regional pay TV service, Superchannel (later rebranded as Movie Central).

In January 1992, Allarcom received CRTC approval for a regional general interest PPV licence serving British Columbia, Alberta, Saskatchewan, Manitoba, Yukon, and the Northwest Territories, replacing the expiring experimental licence; as part of the approval, the CRTC mandated that customers could no longer be required to also subscribe to Superchannel. The service later operated under the Viewers Choice name, licensing the name and sharing the same satellite feeds as the similar PPV service operating in Eastern Canada, Viewers Choice, which had launched in late 1991.

Logo used as Viewer's Choice.

In late 1999, plans were announced to sell the service's parent company, WIC, and its various assets in parts to Shaw Communications, CanWest Global, and Corus Entertainment. WIC's Viewers Choice service, and most of the company's other specialty and pay television services, were sold to Corus. In July 2000, the CRTC approved the transfer of ownership to Corus.

Soon after the Corus took ownership of the service, in March 2001, Corus announced that it would sell the service to Shaw Communications for $35 million. In December 2001, the CRTC approved the change in ownership.

On March 30, 2006, the CRTC amended the service's licence, allowing it to be distributed nationally, and to carry French-language programming for the first time. This took effect on December 27, 2007, when Shaw Direct dropped the Viewers Choice-branded feeds in favour of feeds with generic "PPV" branding. At about the same time, Shaw dropped Canal Indigo in favour of Shaw PPV's new French-language "TALC"-branded feeds.
