= Bell Fibe TV =

Canadian IPTV provider

- Type: Subsidiary
- Industry: Telecommunications
- Predecessor: Bell Entertainment Service
- Founded: September 13, 2010; 15 years ago
- Headquarters: Montreal, Quebec, Canada
- Area served: Ontario; Quebec
- Products: IPTV
- Parent: BCE
- Website: bell.ca/fibetv

Bell Fibe TV is an IPTV-based multichannel television service offered by Bell Canada, as part of fibre broadband services in parts of the Canadian provinces of Ontario, Quebec, Manitoba (as Bell MTS Fibe TV) and Atlantic Canada (as Bell Aliant Fibe TV).

After a pilot under the Bell Entertainment Service branding, Bell Fibe TV officially launched on September 13, 2010, in parts of Ontario and Quebec. In 2016, Bell Aliant FibreOP TV was merged into the Fibe brand, followed by Bell MTS TV.

== History ==
Bell began researching for a new television solution in 2004 in order to penetrate into urban markets where building owners restricted the installation of satellite dishes. The launch of Bell ExpressVu for Condos (VDSL service) proved to be ineffective since that service did not allow for customers to benefit from HD programming and PVR options. In 2006, after much research was done, Bell started testing IPTV technologies in Toronto, Quebec City, and Montréal with Bell employees using the ADSL platform. In October 2007, Bell finally launched a pilot project of IPTV branded as Bell Entertainment Service in select areas and buildings of Toronto. Most of the features that are now available with Fibe TV were offered with Bell Entertainment Service. Some key traits of Bell Entertainment Service were internet and TV charges being billed as one service, "White Glove" customer service and media sharing. After finalizing testing for the new IPTV service in the following years, Bell finally rolled out a contained launch in Toronto and Montreal under the "Bell Fibe TV" brand name in June 2010 followed by an official launch later that year in September.

On July 19, 2016 Bell Aliant announced that its previously-separate FibreOP services in Atlantic Canada, including FibreOP TV, would be brought under the Fibe brand beginning August 1. On September 6, 2016, Bell announced that beginning in 2017, Bell Fibe TV customers would no longer be required to also sign up for Fibe Internet service in order to receive Fibe TV service. MTS Premium TV was similarly integrated into the Fibe brand as Bell MTS Fibe TV in 2017.

== Availability ==
Bell Fibe TV is currently available in select areas of Ontario and Quebec. It is also available in Atlantic Canada and Manitoba via the Bell Aliant and Bell MTS subsidiaries respectively.

FibreOP has been rebranded as Fibe. There is constant ongoing expansion in provinces. Those noted being offered by Bell in Ontario and Quebec include:

Ontario	Quebec
Almonte^{1}	Alma
Amherstburg	Chicoutimi
Carleton Place^{1}	Gatineau
Guelph	Jonquière
Kingston	La Baie
Kitchener	Montreal
London	Quebec City
Mississauga	Rivière-du-Loup
Niagara	Roberval
Ottawa	Saint-Félicien
Sault Ste. Marie	Sherbrooke
Greater Sudbury	Thetford Mines
Toronto	Trois-Rivières
Waterloo	Victoriaville
Windsor	Laval

^{1}Fibe TV in Almonte and Carleton Place is only available in areas that are served by FTTH.

== Hardware ==
The Bell Fibe TV platform is based on MediaKind's Mediaroom platform. In 2022, Bell began to shift Fibe TV to Android TV-based digital media players as set-top boxes using Mediaroom Play; the new boxes feature cloud PVR functionality, universal search that aggregates television programming with internet video and over-the-top media services, access to Google Play Store, and a voice control remote control.

In October 2025, Bell announced plans to phase out the distribution of set-top boxes for new customers in January 2026, with users being directed to download the Bell Fibe TV app on a compatible device (such as a smart TV or existing digital media player) instead.

== Features ==
Features of Bell Fibe TV include the following:

- Whole Home PVR: a brand name also used by many of Bell's competitors. It describes a system where all receivers in a household are connected together via a local network. This allows viewers to record, pause and playback content from any room in the house.
  - Fibe TV PVRs can store up to 320 hours of HD content or 150 hours of 4K content with the 4K PVR (5662) or 160 hours of HD content with the 2262. Hours-capacity is doubled for SD (standard definition) 480p channels 1-999.
- Fibe TV On Demand: a VOD service with over 1000 titles, including movies & TV series
- Ability to search for programs by title, cast members, or a simple keyword search. The electronic program guide has 14 days worth of listings and allows viewers to customize the display to show their favourite channels.
- Picture in picture browsing and channel surfing: viewers can watch one channel and browse other channels or channel listings.
- Changing channels happens with virtually no delay compared to satellite service.
- For every standard definition channel subscribed to, customers receive the HD version (when available) at no extra charge in Ontario. Since the programming options are different in Québec, HD channels are included in "The Basic" package but need to be selected separately for any "A La Carte" option.
- TV based apps such as Netflix, Youtube (4K PVR only), Stingray Music, TSN Extra, or The Weather Network.

== Channels ==
Bell Fibe TV provides up to 500 channels (fewer in Atlantic Canada, about half the number available in Ontario) including all major Canadian and US networks, popular specialty services, PPV, sports packages, over 85 international services and over 115 high-definition channels. Key services include:

- Fibe TV on Demand: Crave, HBO, Treehouse, and YTV. Also providing rental movies from current releases to 2 decades back.
- Crave: A Canadian subscription video on demand service for cable and satellite subscribers.
- English-language premium movie channels: Crave, Super Channel, and HBO Canada
- Super Écran: A French-language premium movie service.
- Several sport-themed premium services: beIN Sports (HD & En Espanol HD), March Madness HD, MLB Extra Innings (SD & HD), NFL RedZone (SD & HD), NFL Sunday Ticket (SD & HD), NHL Centre Ice (SD & HD) and Sportsnet World (SD & HD)
- Vu!: pay-per-view featuring 50 English-language channels and 22 French-language channels
- Six adult pornography channels (Bell's thirteen Venus pornographic channels are unavailable on Fibe TV)
- Over 150 international channels in over 27 different languages including CPAC, TLN, Omni 2, TFC, GMA Pinoy TV, and Kapatid Channel International
- 68 radio channels; 47 Stingray Music digital music stations and 19 Canadian commercial radio stations, and Seattle's KUOW-FM

== Internet service ==
Bell Fibe TV used to require a Bell Internet subscription. It is now possible to subscribe to Fibe TV without also subscribing to internet (Bell references it as "Dark TV"), but it is not possible to do so via Bell's website at the moment. The speed listed for the Internet connection remains unused for the television service.

== Simultaneous streaming ==
=== with 4K ===
With the 4K PVR, it is possible to watch or record up to 10 different channels simultaneously, 4 of which can be at 4K resolution.

Up to 6 shows can be recorded simultaneously.

=== with HD ===
With the HD PVR, it is possible to watch or record up to 4 different channels simultaneously but only up to three in HD. So to view four different channels, one of them must be in standard definition. The HD PVR can record up to two shows simultaneously. Note that the same channel playing on two or more receivers only counts as one channel, as receivers that gets tuned to a channel already playing on another receiver will reuse the same video stream.

== See also ==
- List of United States television stations available in Canada
