= Shaw Broadcast Services =

Canadian cable services company

Shaw Satellite Services Inc.
- Formerly: Canadian Satellite Communications (1981-2006)
- Type: Division
- Industry: TV Service Provider
- Founded: 1981; 45 years ago
- Headquarters: Mississauga, Ontario, Canada
- Area served: Canada
- Parent: Shaw Communications (2000-2023); Rogers Communications (2023-present)
- Website: http://www.shawbroadcast.com/

Shaw Satellite Services Inc., dba Shaw Broadcast Services (French: Services de Radiodiffusion Shaw), is the division of Canadian telecommunications company Shaw Communications that is responsible for providing and managing the distribution of television channels to cable companies via satellite. Shaw Communications also operates Shaw Direct, a Canadian direct broadcast satellite service.

It was known as (Cancom) prior to its acquisition by Shaw. On October 5, 2006, Shaw announced that CANCOM would be renamed Shaw Satellite Services, with CANCOM Broadcast becoming Shaw Broadcast Services, and CANCOM Tracking becoming Shaw Tracking, in 2007.

As Cancom, the service was originally owned by a consortium of several Canadian broadcasting companies, but ownership changes eventually consolidated Shaw as the primary owner. The company was previously required by the CRTC to be operated independently of Shaw's cable holdings. However, in light of the name change, it is unclear if Shaw's satellite-based companies would remain independent from the cable division.

== Canadian Satellite Communications Ltd. (CANCOM) ==
In 1980, the CRTC began a proceeding to expand the choice of television and radio signals available to Canadians who were then regarded as underserved, often with only CBC Television and CBC Radio available to them. Several companies filed proposals, and early in 1981, the CRTC licensed the proposal by Canadian Satellite Communications Inc, a consortium of Canadian broadcasting companies including Allarcom of Edmonton, Western International Communications of Vancouver, Maclean Hunter and Selkirk Broadcasting of Toronto, Telemedia of Montreal, Philippe de Gaspe Beaubien, a Quebec broadcast executive, and Rolf Hougen, a businessman whose interests included CKRW radio and WHTV Cablevision of Whitehorse.

CANCOM began test broadcasts with three (CITV, CHCH, BCTV) of its four signals on 15 July 1981, swapped one of the three in November (CHCH for TCTV), and went into full operation on 1 January 1982 with all four signals: independent stations CITV Edmonton, CHCH-TV Hamilton, CTV affiliate BCTV Vancouver, and a French-language channel known as TCTV but which largely represented the programming of CFTM-TV Montreal. Initially, Cancom charged cable television companies anywhere from fifteen cents to sixty-five cents per TV channel per subscriber (channel subs) depending on the number of Cancom channels carried on the cable system and the number of subscribers receiving the channels. The company also was licensed to carry the signals of nine radio stations; eight as originally proposed, plus CKRW of Whitehorse (added during the hearings).

Through the 1970s, the CRTC had established the principle of allowing cable television companies to carry "three-plus-one" from a nearby American city: the three commercial networks plus PBS. Cable companies further from the border, if they could offer this, had to use microwave, while many more could not afford to do so at all. In 1982, CANCOM proposed adding additional radio signals and four additional television stations, originating in the United States, in order to bring the American "three-plus-one" package to all Canadians. The CRTC approved and, on 1 September 1983, CANCOM began transmitting the four Detroit affiliates of the three major commercial networks and PBS: WJBK-TV, WDIV-TV, WXYZ-TV and WTVS. Cancom was a world leader with its pioneering technical expertise (including the first commercial and consumer applications of digital encryption for satellite TV distribution), and the first carrier to offer consumers direct broadcast satellite (DBS) services.

Cancom's services proved popular in the US as well. In 1985, senior vice president Steven D. Comrie struck a controversial deal with US cable operators to deliver Cancom's Detroit signals to remote villages and communities across Alaska. Despite objections from various US copyright holders, Comrie and a group of Alaska cable operators led by Gordon Rock of Seattle, WA, won federal approval for statewide distribution of Cancom's Detroit channels. However, Cancom's foray into the US was stalled when Canadian trade officials were reportedly warned by US authorities that no such exemption would be considered for the lower 48 states. Comrie later left Cancom to join Rock and US cellular industry pioneer Craig McCaw to co-found Netlink USA, and the Kirkland WA-based company launched its DBS lineup of Denver's ABC, CBS, and NBC affiliates, plus PBS and independents at the Western Cable Show in Anaheim, CA in December 1986. In later years, Netlink was sold to the largest US cable operator at the time, TCI.

Cancom later picked up additional stations including Seattle's KING (NBC) and KOMO (ABC) to offer a greater diversity of time zone feeds for its primary Canadian market, as alternatives to WXYZ and WDIV.

== Shaw Broadcast ==
Shaw Broadcast (originally CANCOM Broadcast) distributes both specialty cable channels and regular broadcast network affiliates via one of North America's largest full-service commercial signal distribution networks. It distributes affiliates of all the major Canadian commercial networks, along with several independent services.

The company also distributes a limited number of American network affiliates from markets such as Boston, Rochester, Buffalo, Detroit, Minneapolis, Spokane and Seattle. Some Canadian cable companies use Shaw for these services where cost or technical issues prevent the use of a closer non-Shaw signal, even when the station is from a different time zone. (However, use of the Shaw feeds is not required for these services; cable companies are free to use any signal provider whose distribution is technically feasible.)

As well, Shaw distributes a number of Canadian radio stations, and a few American stations, for cable FM and digital distribution. In total, over 380 English, French and multilingual signals are offered via 49 Anik F1 and F2 transponders.

== Shaw Tracking ==
Shaw Tracking (originally CANCOM Tracking) provided commercial transportation and logistics solutions via satellite to the Canadian trucking industry, specifically tracking and two-way messaging.

Shaw Tracking was later acquired by Omnitracs, LLC on September 18, 2017 for an undisclosed sum.

== See also ==
- Orbita (TV system)
- Bell Satellite TV
- Satellite dish
