= Vu! =

Canadian pay-per-view and video-on-demand provider

- Country: Canada
- Broadcast area: National
- Headquarters: Toronto, Ontario

Programming
- Picture format: 480i (SDTV); 1080i (HDTV)

Ownership
- Owner: Bell Media

History
- Launched: October 1999; 26 years ago

Links
- Website: Vu!

Vu!, also operating as Bell TV On Demand, is a Canadian English and French language pay-per-view and Video on Demand provider that launched in October 1999 and is owned by Bell Media. Vu! is the largest PPV service provider in Canada and is available on Telus Satellite TV, Bell Satellite TV, Bell Fibe TV, and Bell Aliant FibreOP. It not only offers pay-per-view content but also features pay-per-day, pay-per-month and pay-per-year on select programming.

== History ==
Vu! started operations in October 1999.

On July 5, 2013, Bell Canada's media arm (and Bell TV's sister company), Bell Media, acquired control of a competing pay-per-view service, Viewers Choice, which served cable companies prior to its demise, as part of their takeover of Astral Media. A year later, in July 2014, industry website Cartt.ca reported that Viewers Choice would be shutting down on September 30, 2014. Vu! was directly unaffected by the shutdown except that it also began to serve Bell Aliant customers in place of Viewers Choice after the channel shut down.

== Programming ==
Vu!'s programming consists of films, concerts, live boxing, Ultimate Fighting Championship, WWE and Total Nonstop Action Wrestling, All Elite Wrestling, World Series of Poker and other special events. They also consist of select programming from AXS TV as well as various sports packages including NHL Centre Ice, NFL Sunday Ticket, NASCAR In Car, NCAA basketball, HPItv horse racing, and cricket.

== Red Carpet Vu! ==
In an effort to compete with the video on demand services offered by cable companies, Vu! has launched Red Carpet Vu!. This service features 8 channels with new releases and hit films playing all day with a film starting every 15 minutes.

== Venus ==
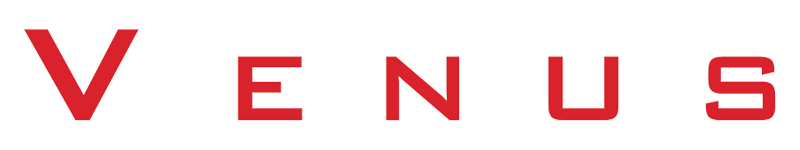
Venus logo

Venus is Bell Satellite TV's adult-oriented pornography pay-per-view service, operated separately from Vu! (but under the same licence by Bell) with more expensive prices. Bell receivers can access two channels, one in English and one in French, for information on how to block all adult oriented channels, including Venus. Currently, there are 14 main Venus pay-per-view channels and one info/preview channel, making up a total of 15. They consist of:

- 11 English language PPV channels.
- 3 French language PPV channels.
- 1 PPV channel featuring gay pornography.
- 1 info channel.
