= Sportsnet PPV =

- Country: Canada
- Broadcast area: National
- Headquarters: Toronto, Ontario

Programming
- Picture format: 480i (SDTV); 1080i (HDTV)

Ownership
- Owner: Rogers Communications (Rogers Communications Partnership)

History
- Launched: January 1996; 30 years ago
- Former names: Sports/Specials Pay-Per-View; Rogers Sportsnet PPV

Sportsnet PPV is a Canadian pay-per-view (PPV) service owned by Rogers Communications. It is the PPV service used by Rogers Cable, Cogeco Cable and Source Cable for offering out-of-market sports packages and occasionally other special events. Since October 1, 2014, Rogers and Source (potentially among others) have also used Sportsnet PPV as their main general-interest pay-per-view provider, replacing Viewers Choice which shut down the previous evening. The service is co-branded with Rogers' sports channel Sportsnet.

The "Sportsnet PPV" name (which stems from Rogers' Sportsnet channels) was not originally used on-air, as individual packages and programs were marketed directly by participating service providers. Following its expansion to general-interest programming, the service launched a barker channel which promotes special events under the Sportsnet PPV brand, as well as adult programming under the Adult4U brand. Unlike Viewers Choice and most other pay-per-view services in Canada, the service does not carry mass-market movies, though its barker channel shows previews of movies which are promoted as being available through individual cable companies' video on demand services.

== History ==
The service was first licensed in December 1995 as a direct-broadcast satellite-only PPV service under the name "Sports/Specials Pay-Per-View", and launched shortly thereafter in January 1996. At the time the service was 60% owned by CTV, 20% by Molson, and 20% by a subsidiary of Liberty Media (later transferred to Fox Sports Net). The partners were also three of the four partners in the regional sports service licensed a few months before which would become Sportsnet. At the time its planned programming was described as featuring "coverage of professional and amateur sports competitions" along with occasional coverage of non-sports special events, such as G7 summits or papal visits. An accompanying digital terrestrial PPV licence was issued in September 1996.

In February 2002, Molson transferred its ownership stake to CTV. One year later, CTV sold its 80% interest in the service to Rogers Media, which had previously acquired Sportsnet from CTV after the latter's acquisition of TSN. At that point the service became known as "Rogers Sportsnet PPV". By 2005, Rogers had bought out Fox's stake in the service, and responsibility was transferred from Rogers Media to Rogers Cable.

In June 2014, the CRTC renewed the service's licence under the commission's new standard conditions of licence for pay-per-view services, which allow all such services to offer a full lineup of pay-per-view programs. Shortly after that announcement, Viewers Choice, the general-interest PPV provider at that point co-owned by Bell Media and Rogers which had served as Rogers' primary PPV service since its launch in 1991, announced plans to shut down on September 30, 2014, specifically citing Rogers' (and Bell's) ownership of their own wholly owned PPV services. On October 1, 2014, Sportsnet PPV expanded its service on Rogers, Source, and potentially other providers to include the types of special events and adult programming previously carried on Viewers Choice.

== Programming ==
=== Out-of-market sports ===
As of the time its 2014 licence renewal application was filed, Sportsnet PPV offered the following programming / packages:

- NFL Sunday Ticket, including NFL RedZone
- NHL Centre Ice
- MLB Extra Innings
- NBA League Pass
- ESPN GamePlan (U.S. college football)
- ESPN Full Court (U.S. college basketball)
- OHL Action Pak – out-of-market OHL games produced by community channels including Rogers TV and TVCogeco
- Rogers TV Sports + – out-of-market local sports events produced by local Rogers TV channels; currently included with Digital Basic for all Rogers customers
- Selected Indian Premier League games
- Coverage of International Cricket Council championships

The above packages are available individually, and the North American sports league packages are also available as part of the "Super Sports Pak" bundle.

=== Other events / programming ===
Prior to October 2014, the Sportsnet PPV service was carried alongside Viewers Choice on Rogers, Cogeco, and Source. As a result of this and its licence restrictions, Sportsnet PPV did not offer any of the movies, adult programming, or special events such as boxing or professional wrestling which were offered by Viewers Choice.

On October 1, 2014, following the shutdown of Viewers Choice, most of that service's channels were replaced on Rogers Cable by new Sportsnet PPV channels carrying similar programming; however, at least on Rogers, the new channels solely feature live special events and adult programming. Several channels which aired general-interest movies were not replaced, though such content is now generally available through video on demand services operated directly by most service providers. In fact, the service's barker channel prominently promotes movies available on demand through Rogers and most other carrying providers, although neither Rogers nor any other service provider is explicitly named on that channel.

On July 31, 2014, Rogers announced an agreement with professional wrestling promotion WWE whereby Rogers would become the exclusive Canadian distribution partner for WWE's pay-per-view events as well as the WWE Network, which in most countries is distributed as an over-the-top streaming service. As part of the agreement, a "preview" version of WWE Network launched in Canada as a linear channel under the Sportsnet PPV licence on August 12, similar to how Sportsnet World was distributed when it was first launched, while Rogers seeks CRTC approval to add WWE Network to the CRTC's list of non-Canadian programming services authorized for distribution.

All of Sportsnet PPV's programming is currently broadcast in the English language, but it has the ability to carry French-language programming, and up to 15% of its programming in other languages.

=== Past programming ===
For approximately two years from mid-2007 to mid-2009, the Setanta Sports Canada service was offered as a dedicated channel within the Sportsnet PPV service, though for all intents and purposes it effectively acted as a pay channel subscribed to on a monthly basis. Sentanta (now Sportsnet World) was eventually converted to a specialty channel licence.
