= NHL Centre Ice =

Canadian television sports package

NHL Centre Ice is a Canadian digital cable subscription out-of-market sports package controlled and distributed by Rogers Communications through Rogers Cable as of 2014. It is offered by three national satellite television service providers, Bell Satellite TV, TELUS Optik TV, Telus Satellite TV, and Shaw Direct and many digital cable television providers such as Eastlink, Shaw, Cogeco and more.

It offers NHL regular season and select playoff games that are played outside the local viewing area using American local and national television networks such as ABC, ESPN, and TNT/TBS. It offers both standard and high definition games.

== Blackout restrictions ==
NHL Centre Ice does not black out any game based on attendance or mileage to said arena. All home teams are blacked out in their designated TV markets. For example, customers in Toronto cannot see Toronto Maple Leafs games on NHL Centre Ice; these local games are instead available on a local Toronto station.

This creates a significant problem in areas that lie within the blackout zone but are not served by the NHL team's regional sports network. Erie, Pennsylvania is an American example of this: Erie is in the Buffalo Sabres' blackout zone, but MSG Network is not carried in that section of Pennsylvania, thus resulting in a total blackout of all Sabres games not carried on a national provider. (When Empire Sports Network existed, that outlet did serve Erie.)

Blackouts can be lifted if one team is not televising the game and the other is, provided the non-broadcasting team grants permission. On some systems, WGN-TV Blackhawks games are not blacked out on WGN-TV in Canada even when they are playing a Canadian team even when it's the local team.

== Availability ==
NHL Centre Ice is available with these cable and satellite providers:

- TELUS Optik TV
- TELUS Satellite TV
- Bell Satellite TV
- Bell Aliant
- Access Communications
- Cogeco Cable
- Eastlink Cable
- Northwestel
- Rogers Cable
- Shaw Cable
- SaskTel maxTV
- Vianet
- Westman Communications

== See also ==
- NFL Sunday Ticket
- MLB Extra Innings
- NBA League Pass
- NASCAR Hot Pass
- ESPN College Extra
- MLS Direct Kick
