= Bell Satellite TV =

Canadian satellite TV provider

- Formerly: Bell ExpressVu
- Type: Subsidiary
- Industry: Satellite television
- Founded: January 1, 1997; 29 years ago
- Headquarters: Montreal, Quebec, Canada
- Area served: Canada
- Products: Direct broadcast satellite Pay television Pay-per-view
- Parent: BCE Inc.
- Website: bell.ca/tv

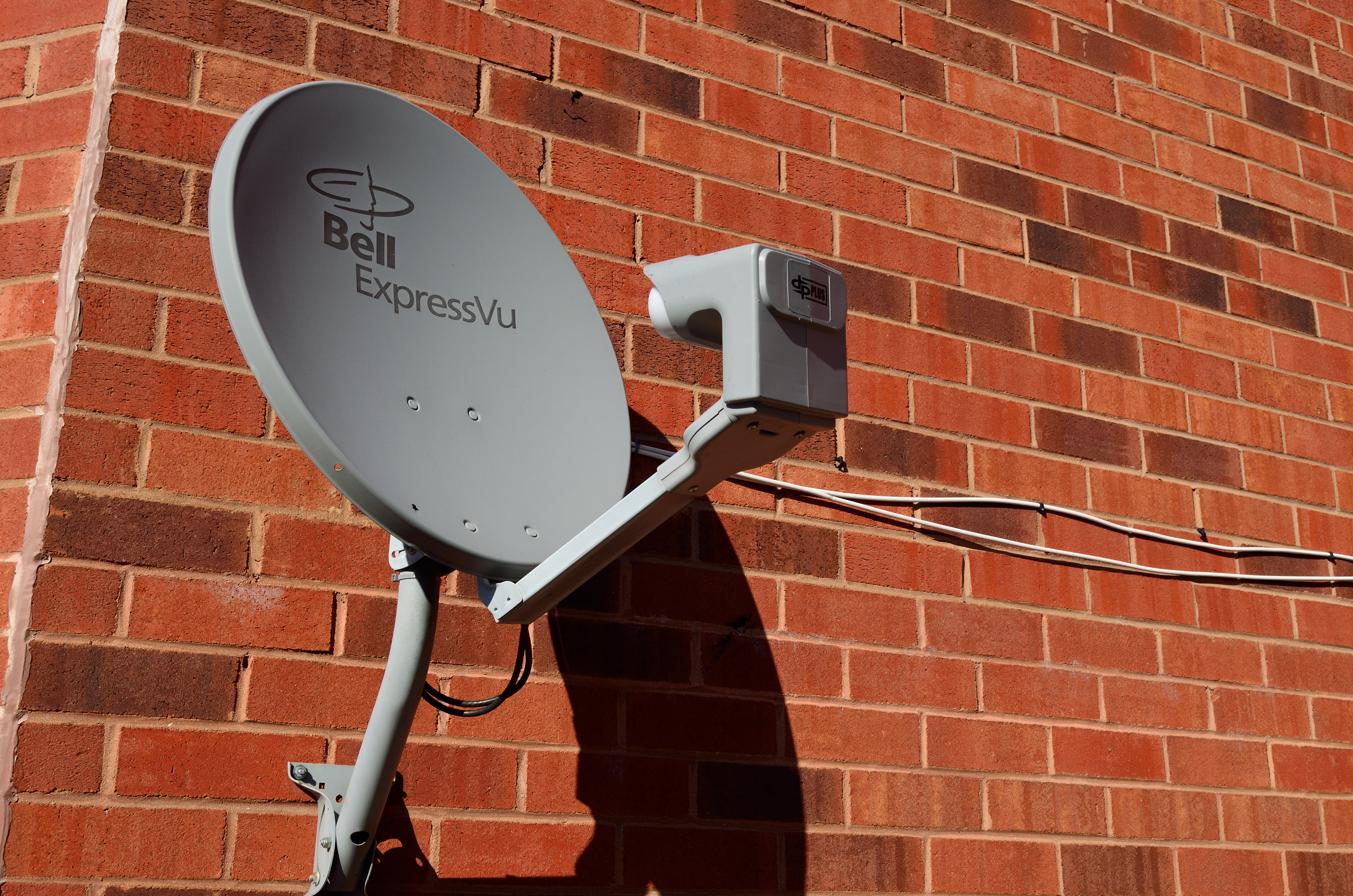
A Bell ExpressVu satellite dish

Bell Satellite TV (French: Bell Télé; formerly known as Bell ExpressVu, Dish Network Canada and ExpressVu Dish Network and not to be confused with Bell's IPTV Fibe TV service) is the division of BCE Inc. that provides satellite television service across Canada. It launched on September 10, 1997. As of April 2017, Bell Satellite TV provides over 700 channels (including over 430 SDTV, 200 HDTV and 80 audio channels) to over 1 million subscribers. Its major competitors include satellite service Shaw Direct, as well as various cable and communications companies across Canada.

Bell Satellite TV for Condos (French: Bell Télé pour copropriétés) launched as Bell ExpressVu for Condos in 2004. It was a VDSL service for select multidwelling units (condominiums and apartments) in Montreal, Ottawa and Toronto. It later evolved into an IPTV service. Since 2010, this service operates as Bell Fibe TV and is delivered over FTTN or FTTH technology. By the end of the decade, Fibe TV became Bell's main television service offering, with over 75% more subscribers compared to satellite TV.

Bell Satellite TV services were also repackaged and resold by Telus as Telus Satellite TV, in areas where the latter company's Optik IPTV services are unavailable.

== History ==
=== 1990s: inception as ExpressVu ===
ExpressVu was conceived in 1994, at the time of American DSS systems launch, as a consortium of Ontario-based Tee-Comm Electronics, Canadian Satellite Communications (Cancom), Vancouver-based Western International Communications (WIC) and Bell Canada Enterprises (BCE), with a projected startup date of late 1995. High technology development costs and delays placed Tee-Comm in a severe financial position, prompting the remaining partners to pull out in 1996. Instead, U.S. satellite-TV provider Echostar Dish Network was chosen to provide the receivers and uplink equipment. The Hughes DirecTV system had already been optioned to Power Broadcasting, in Canada; it has since been withdrawn. Tee-Comm on its own managed to launch the first DBS service in Canada, AlphaStar, in early 1997; however, in a matter of months the company went bankrupt and the service was discontinued, leaving thousands of consumers with useless receivers (although with some reconfiguration, could be used to receive unencrypted FTA channels). ExpressVu launched service in September 1997, initially as "Dish Network Canada", followed by "ExpressVu Dish Network", in both cases using the Echostar logo. On November 5, it launched an advertising campaign featuring couples wearing ExpressVu dishes on their heads telling about its benefits, ending with the slogan "get your head on our dish". The campaign targeted a wide consumer demographic in order to prove that they were "better than the cable monopolies", according to marketing director Stuart Morris.

=== 2000s: Bell purchases ExpressVu, later renames it Bell Satellite TV ===
Bell Satellite TV's former logo as Bell ExpressVu

Bell took over full ownership of ExpressVu by 2000.

The ExpressVu name was retired in August 2008 along with the Today Just Got Better advertising campaign. Bell's television services as a whole are now simply called Bell TV. When disambiguation is required, the satellite service is called Bell Satellite TV.

Plans have been shelved for any additional ExpressVu satellite expenditures assuming pending CRTC and Industry Canada approval for Dish Network to use all 32 transponders on Nimiq 5. As a result of this, SES has announced that they will not be replacing the ill-fated AMC-14 now that Dish Network has cut this deal with Telesat & BCE for Nimiq 5 usage.

In 2009, Telus reached a deal to resell a re-packaged version of the Bell Satellite TV service in parts of Alberta and British Columbia known as Telus Satellite TV. The agreement was designed to allow Telus the ability to "instantly" offer a quadruple play of services in markets where it has not yet deployed its IPTV services, while also allowing Bell to increase its television market share in Western Canada. The Telus-branded service co-exists with the Bell-branded version of Bell Satellite TV, which is still offered in the markets that Telus Satellite TV is offered. As of March 31, 2018 Telus Satellite TV is no longer available to new customers. Current subscribers can update their channels by calling 310-MYTV (6968).

=== 2010s: discontinuation of SDTV receivers and traditional theme packages ===
In 2012, Bell changed satellite plans in Ontario. They are now sold in packages called "Good", "Better" and "Best" similarly to its competitor Rogers Cable in that region. Channels in the "Best" tier can still be purchased in theme packages, and existing customers with older plans are grandfathered. This also does not affect other regions such as Quebec, where there are different types of plans. Along with these changes, Bell discontinued sales and rentals of its final standard-definition television (SDTV) receiver, the 4100 model. Customers who still have an older SDTV with an AV input (or peripheral modulator) can use an HD receiver, but the quality will be limited to 480i due to technical limitations.

== Satellites ==
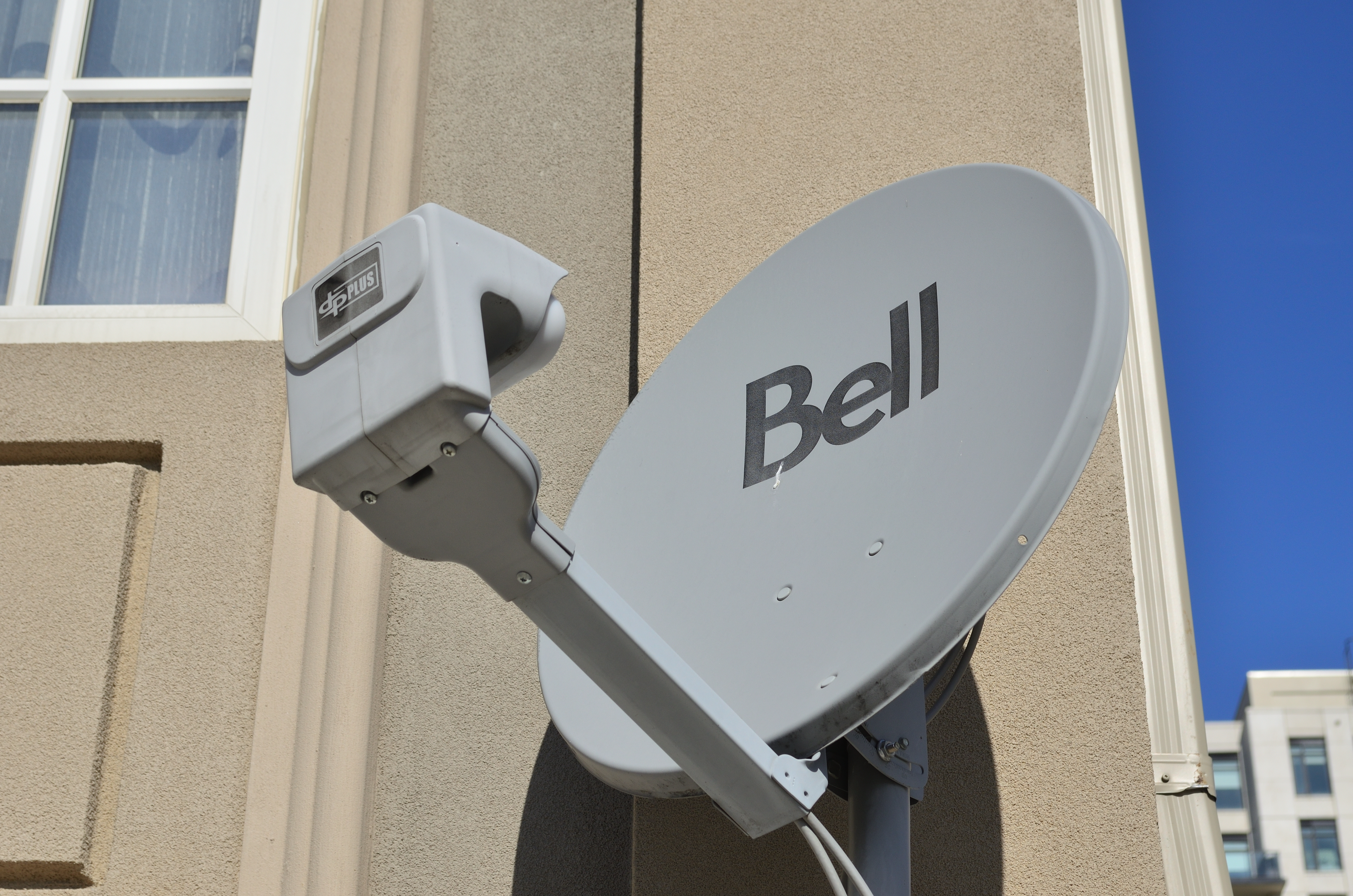
A Bell Satellite TV satellite dish

Bell Satellite TV broadcasts from two geostationary satellites: Nimiq 4 and 6. Nimiq 4 was launched on September 19, 2008, and Nimiq 6 was launched on May 17, 2012. Both satellites follow an equatorial path, giving coverage to most of Canada. Nimiq is an Inuktitut word for "that which unifies" and was chosen from a nationwide naming contest in 1998. The two satellites are owned and operated by Telesat Canada. Bell's uplink site is located in North York, Toronto, Ontario.

Nimiq 4, located at 82° W primarily serves Bell's high-definition television content. Nimiq 6, located at 91.1°W primarily serves Bell's standard-definition television and radio content. Each satellite has 32 Ku-band transponders. A transponder usually has enough bandwidth to broadcast approximately 10 channels. Because HDTV requires more bandwidth, some transponders typically broadcast only 4-5 channels. LyngSat provides a listing of channels on Nimiq 4 and Nimiq 6 broken down by transponder.

=== Past satellites ===
Nimiq 1 was launched on May 20, 1999 and contains 32 Ku-band transponders. at 91°W. (From the time of service launch in 1997 to the switch to Nimiq in 1999, ExpressVu used the already crowded Anik E2.) Nimiq 2, launched on December 29, 2002, also includes 32 K-band transponders. Nimiq 2 provides HDTV, international programming, and all newly released channels. It occupies the 82° W slot. Nimiq 3 went online on August 23, 2004. Originally called DirecTV3, it is an old DirecTV satellite moved to a new orbital slot near Nimiq 1 to offload some of the transmitting work from the original satellite. In February 2006, Nimiq 3 was moved behind Nimiq 2 to support it, while another satellite, Nimiq 4i (formerly DirecTV2), took Nimiq 3's spot behind Nimiq 1. Nimiq 4i was replaced with Nimiq 4iR as it ran out of fuel on April 28, 2007 and was de-orbited. Both Nimiq 3 and Nimiq 4iR feature 16 Ku-band transponders. Nimiq 4 was launched by a Proton rocket which lifted off on September 19, 2008 at 21:48 UTC.

== Services ==
=== Installation ===
One to four receivers are typically connected to a single satellite dish, with additional receivers unsupported by Bell. Bell has mostly focused on improving its satellite signal reception in Canada while seeking to prevent snowbirds from accessing this signal. The use of Bell Satellite TV services in the United States is not illegal, but it remains a controversial issue.

=== Interactive services ===
Current and many past receiver models support interactive services, branded as iTV, offering information services for weather and sports. When watching The Weather Network, for example, one can select their local city to receive detailed information about that city's weather conditions. For sports such as NFL Sunday Ticket or NHL Centre Ice, iTV allows fans to simultaneously keep track of multiple games. This means that when the watcher is concentrating on one single game, they will be notified if the score changes for other games.

Basic video games, lottery results and horoscopes were previously available as Bell Satellite TV interactive services, along with adult-only games, before being discontinued in 2008.

=== Pay-per-view ===
Pay-per-view (PPV) events may be ordered either via the receiver itself with a remote control and phone line connection, via Bell's website, or via an automated phone system. The telephone line is solely used for caller ID and ordering purposes, and is not used for firmware and programme guide updates.

== Alternative Bell TV offerings ==
Bell also offers IPTV and mobile television services where available.

=== Bell Fibe TV ===
The Bell Fibe TV service is an implementation of IPTV that uses VDSL to deliver television service via telephone lines. Early versions of this service was originally deployed as "Bell ExpressVu for Condos" to get around restrictions regarding the mounting of satellite dishes. The original service was trialled using "NextLevel Communications" (now part of Motorola) set-top boxes that receive television broadcasts over VDSL in ATM form. The network infrastructure can support large amounts of bandwidth (typically 25 Mbit/s, as of January 2012) and is available in certain cities, including Toronto, Ottawa, Montreal and Quebec City.

=== Bell Mobile TV ===
Since October 18, 2010, Bell Mobility allows smartphones and tablet computers on either its HSPA+ or LTE network to access Mobile TV. Virgin Mobile Canada customers can also access Mobile TV. Similar systems by Bell in the past used the phased-out CDMA network. Unlimited access via Wi-Fi was previously available, but has since been discontinued. The service is billed per hour, and customers do not pay any additional fees.

== Channels ==
Bell Satellite TV currently features over 500 channels including all major Canadian networks and several American TV stations (ABC, CBS, Fox, NBC and PBS affiliates), premium movie services, Vu! pay-per-view service, popular radio stations, sports, international and adult programming.
