= Shaw Direct =

Canadian satellite TV provider

Shaw Satellite G.P.
- Trade name: Shaw Direct
- Formerly: Star Choice
- Type: Subsidiary
- Industry: Satellite television
- Founded: 1996; 30 years ago
- Headquarters: Calgary, Alberta, Canada
- Area served: Canada
- Key people: Bradley Shaw (CEO); Paul Macleese (president); Cam Kernahan (Group vice president)
- Products: Direct broadcast satellite, Pay television, Pay-per-view
- Parent: Rogers Communications
- Website: shawdirect.ca

Shaw Direct G.P. is a direct broadcast satellite television distributor in Canada and a subsidiary of the telecommunications company Rogers Communications. As of 2010, Shaw Direct had over 900,000 subscribers. It broadcasts on K_{u} band from two communications satellites: Anik G1 at 107.3°W, and Anik F2 at 111.1°W. Anik F1R, which had been in service for 15 years, reached its end of life in the latter part of 2020, when the services on this satellite were migrated between the remaining two. These satellites are owned by Telesat Canada and otherwise are used primarily to distribute programming to various Canadian cable TV companies. The company was formerly known as Star Choice until April 15, 2009.

A full list of channels carried by these two satellites is available from satellite-related sites such as Lyngsat. The newer of the two satellites, Anik G1, was launched on April 15, 2013, and then later reached orbit on May 29, 2013.

Shaw Direct was founded in Lincoln, New Brunswick, but is now based in Calgary, Alberta. Its broadcast centre is in Mississauga, Ontario, and has call centres in Victoria, Vancouver, Winnipeg and Montreal.

== Technical information ==
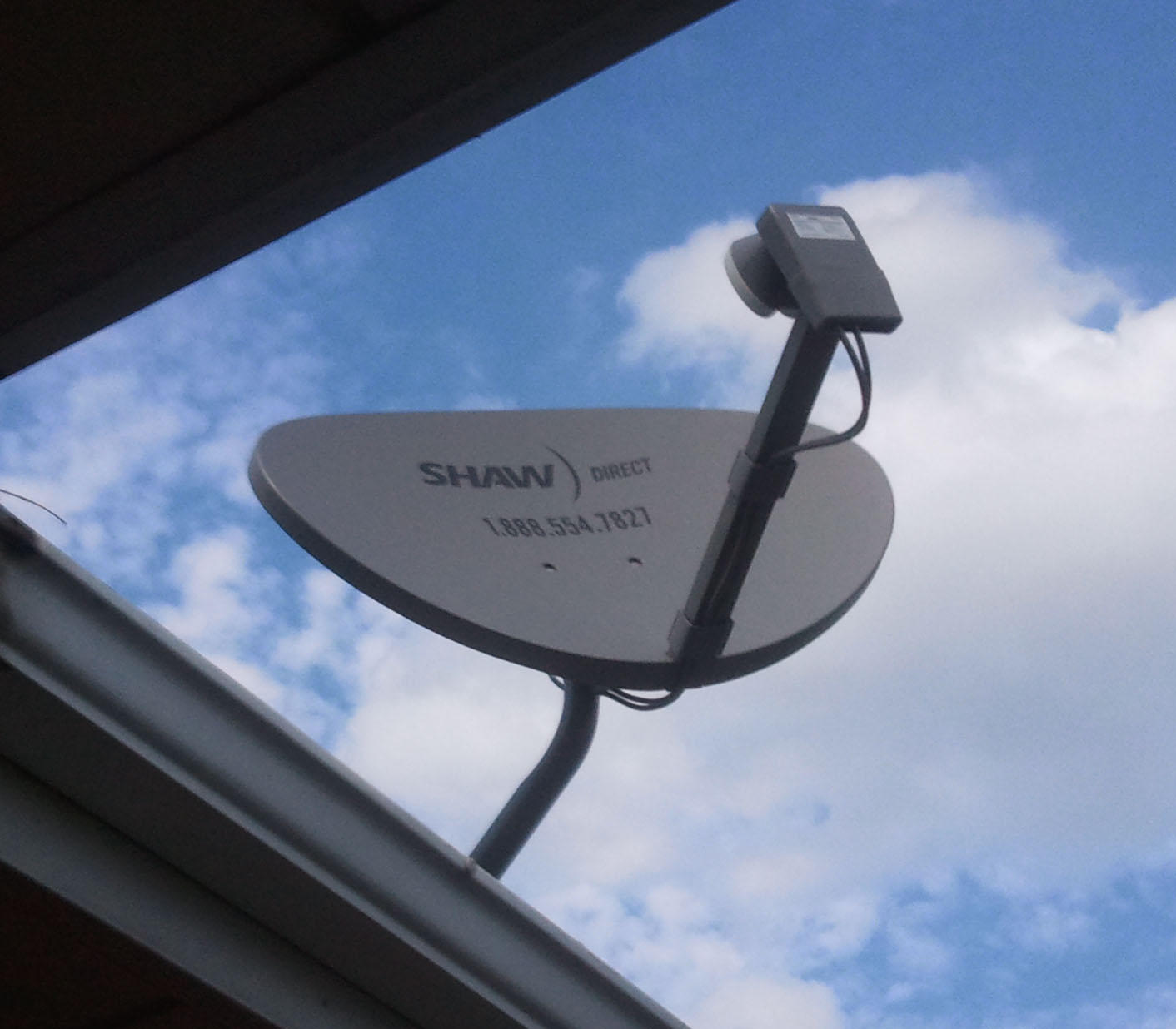
A Shaw Direct 45x60cm dish, with new triple satellite LNB compatible with Anik F1, Anik F2 and Anik G1

The system requires an elliptical antenna of at least 45x60cm in size with a special LNB pair built as one unit to accommodate the narrow 3.8° spacing between satellites; the receiver uses the Motorola-proprietary Digicipher II system which has so far been virtually free of the problems with pirate decryption that have plagued other providers such as rival Bell Satellite TV. The standard 18" DBS antennas used by other providers are not compatible with this system as the signals differ in both frequency and polarization. Shaw Direct is relayed via FSS satellites, Anik G1 and F2.

== Services and pricing ==
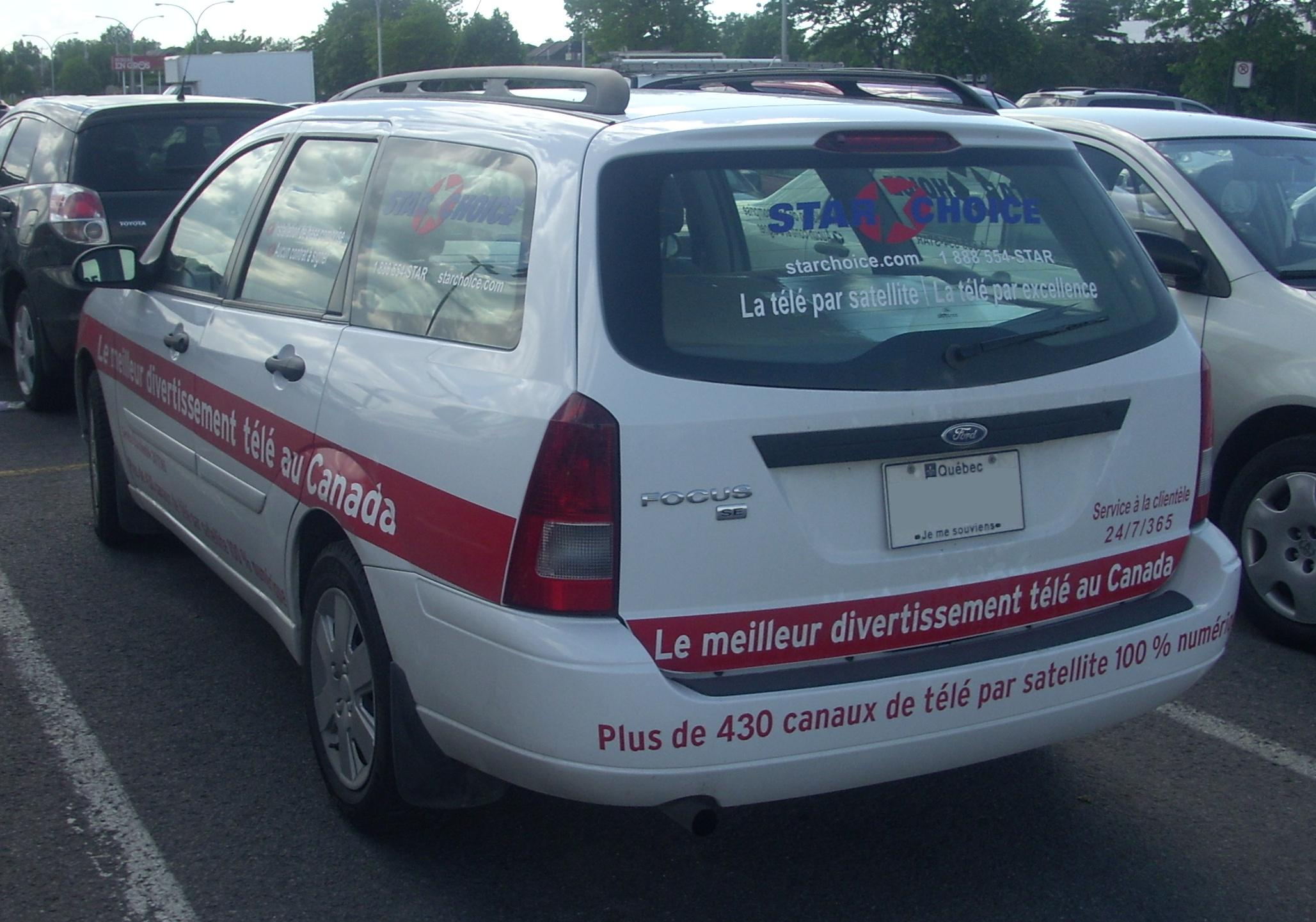
A 2005-07 Ford Focus wagon from Star Choice

Shaw Direct currently features over 500 channels including all major Canadian and American networks, popular specialty services, PPV, sports packages and over 350 HD channels. Key services include:

- Multiple feeds from various affiliate stations of U.S. networks, including ABC, CBS, Fox, NBC and PBS; these feeds come from Detroit (Fox excluded since 2009), Rochester (Fox only), Seattle, Spokane (PBS only since 2019), and Buffalo (PBS only since 2009).
- Crave and Super Channel (English-language premium movie services)
- Super Écran (French-language premium movie service)
- Pay Per View movies and events in standard and high definition from Shaw PPV
- NBA League Pass
- NFL Sunday Ticket
- NHL Centre Ice
- Sportsnet World (premium sports service airing soccer and rugby)
- Exxxtasy TV, Penthouse TV, Playboy TV and Red Hot TV (adult channels)
- 42 commercial-free digital music channels provided by Stingray Music
- 49 Canadian commercial radio stations

Monthly packages range from $30 for the basic service, up to $107.99 for specialty and movie channels. Individual premium and specialty channels can also be purchased. The receivers range from $99 for a basic system to $399 for a high-definition personal video recorder.

In addition, Shaw Direct provides specialty services

- 2nd Home: Allows for programming at a secondary location
- Seasonal Break: Allows you to temporarily suspend programming anywhere from 14 days and up to 180 days, with an automatic reconnect date
- Refer-A-Friend: When referring new customers to the service, you are eligible to receive up to a month of free programming

Starting in 2011, Shaw Direct offered a free satellite dish, receiver, installation and a handful of SD channels to Canadians who lost their over-the-air (OTA) access to television as a result of Canada's digital television transition. The offer was part of Shaw's little known Local Television Satellite Solution (LTSS) program approved by the CRTC as part of Shaw's purchase of Canwest Global in 2010. The period to apply to the program ended August 31, 2014, three months earlier than the original extended application deadline of November 30, 2014. On April 12, 2019, the CRTC opened a public call for comments regarding Shaw Direct's licence renewal request that included its plan to end the LTSS as of August 31, 2019. According to Shaw Direct, more than 31,500 Canadian households subscribed to the no-fee LTSS. While Shaw Direct did end up offering the LTSS beyond August 31, 2019, according to Shaw Direct customer service all remaining LTSS subscribers had been disconnected as of December 20, 2019.

== See also ==
- Shaw Broadcast Services (formerly CANCOM)
