= Telus Optik TV =

Canadian IPTV service

- Company type: Division
- Founded: 2006; 20 years ago
- Headquarters: Vancouver, British Columbia, Canada
- Parent: TELUS Communications
- Website: www.telus.com/tv

TELUS Optik TV is a product of TELUS Communications, a subsidiary of TELUS Corporation, that provides IPTV service in the Canadian provinces of British Columbia, Alberta, and Quebec. The service offers over 630 digital channels, including more than 100 in HD. Despite its name, the service is available to both Fibre To The Node (FTTN) or Fibre To The Home (FTTH) clients, with FTTN implementations using telephone lines instead of fibre optics for a portion of the connection. Telus launched IPTV service in November 2005 to customers in select Alberta communities. As of February 2017, over 1 million customers are subscribed to the Optik TV. Major competitors include satellite services Shaw Direct and Bell Satellite TV, as well as various cable and communications companies across British Columbia and Alberta, such as Rogers, Novus and Eastlink.

== Other television services ==
=== Pik TV ===
TELUS Pik TV was an internet television service that offered live TV and on demand video from 125 television networks. Pik TV was available as an add-on to residential Telus Internet customers. The service was named after the pick-and-pay television model, where customers purchase channels à la carte (pick and pay).

The service was available at two pricing points:

- Basic included up to 23 standard channels, plus the core Crave service or five free à la carte TV channels.
- Pik Max included up to 23 standard channels, plus Crave, ten free à la carte TV channels, three Sportsnet channels and five TSN channels. Pik Max promotions may have offered the Apple TV 4K on contract.

Pik TV service was available on iPhone, iPad, iPod Touch, Apple TV, Android, and web browsers.

The service was discontinued and instead new services called Stream+ and TELUS TV+ have been announced and introduced with similar features that bundles streaming apps like Netflix, Crave, Apple TV+, Prime Video, Crave, Hayu, discovery+, Shudder, Sundance Now, IFC Films Unlimited and Acorn TV.

=== Satellite TV ===
From June 2009 to April 2018, Telus resold BCE's satellite Bell Satellite TV service in parts of Alberta and British Columbia as Telus Satellite TV. The agreement was designed to allow Telus the ability to offer a quadruple play of services in markets where it had not yet deployed Optik TV, while also allowing Bell to increase its television market share in Western Canada. The Telus-branded service co-exists with the Bell-branded version of Bell TV, which is still offered in the markets that Telus Satellite TV is offered. With the resale agreement ending March 31, 2018, Telus continues to support existing subscribers, but no longer accepts new ones.

=== TELUS Presents ===
TELUS Presents is a collection of, as described by Telus, "hard-to-find" international programs available on demand at no additional charge to Optik TV and Pik TV subscribers in Alberta and B.C., introduced in October 2020. Programs available as part of the collection include I Hate Suzie and The Newsreader.

=== TELUS STORYHIVE ===
TELUS STORYHIVE is the community access channel for TELUS Optik TV under the CRTC guidelines for community television in Canada. As described by TELUS it gives underrepresented communities in British Columbia and Alberta an opportunity to share their stories on the Canadian Broadcasting System. Through various programs called Editions, Voices, Video Podcast, Summer Crew, On Location and Community Stories they provide production funding, training, mentorship and distribution on TELUS Optik TV towards short films, podcasts, web series, and live streams often by beginning filmmakers and content creators. They often partner with other Canadian media organizations like Creative BC and the National Screen Institute. STORYHIVE also recently celebrated its 10 year anniversary.

=== TELUS originals ===
TELUS originals according to TELUS supports the production of social purpose documentaries features and series by mid-career independent filmmakers in B.C. and Alberta. They contribute funds to local production in accordance with the same CRTC conditions of license, created seemingly as an off-shoot of STORYHIVE. This means that TELUS originals films are funded from the same community access pool, an allotment that allows them to commission local producers to produce content that TELUS' supports. This is a production fund, that does not acquire finished films. All their programming is distributed through TELUS Optik TV. TELUS originals has made films with local celebrities like physician Gabor Mate and celebrity chef Tojo.

== See also ==
- Telus
