= 1992 in American television =

In 1992, television in the United States saw a number of significant events, including the debuts, finales, and cancellations of television shows; the launch, closure, and rebranding of channels; changes and additions to network affiliations by stations; controversies, business transactions, and carriage disputes; and the deaths of individuals who had made notable contributions to the medium.

== Events ==
Date	Event
January 6	The weekly overnight news program World News Now debuts on ABC.
January 19	The World Wrestling Federation holds the fifth annual Royal Rumble event on pay-per-view. In the main event, Ric Flair wins the Royal Rumble match and the vacant WWF World Heavyweight Championship.
January 26	During halftime of CBS' telecast of Super Bowl XXVI, Fox counter-programs with a special live-edition of the sketch comedy program In Living Color.
January 26	In a 60 Minutes interview on CBS, Bill and Hillary Clinton deny the allegations made against Bill in an interview that was viewed by millions.
February 8	The opening ceremonies for the Winter Olympics from Albertville, France is broadcast on CBS. This is the first of three consecutive Olympic Winter Games that CBS will broadcast, concluding with the 1998 Winter Olympics from Nagano, Japan. It's also the first time that CBS would televise the Olympics (either Winter or Summer) since the 1960 Summer Games from Rome, Italy.
February 14	Green Bay Fox station WXGZ goes dark, and former Green Bay independent station WGBA-TV took the Fox affiliation.
February 22	Barbra Streisand makes a surprise cameo appearance during a "Coffee Talk" sketch with Mike Myers, Madonna, and Roseanne Barr on NBC's Saturday Night Live.
February 24	CBS acquires the assets of Midwest Communications, owners of the network's dominant affiliate in the Twin Cities, WCCO-TV. This also results in an affiliation swap in both Marquette, Michigan and Green Bay, Wisconsin: WJMN-TV, the Midwest-owned satellite station of Green Bay's ABC affiliate WFRV-TV, swaps its own ABC affiliation with primary CBS/secondary NBC affiliate WLUC-TV on this date, while WFRV-TV itself swaps with CBS affiliate WBAY-TV on March 15. (The delay in Green Bay occurs since WBAY-TV wanted to swap on or near March 17, the 39th anniversary of its first sign-on.)
February 29	Full Moon Over Miami, a one-off programming block of a three-way, two-hour crossover event airs on NBC. It involves three television sitcoms created by Susan Harris: The Golden Girls, Empty Nest and Nurses. The event depicts a fictional full moon on Leap Day storming into the storylines of the three series set in Miami, Florida.
March 28	CBS broadcasts the East Regional men's basketball final between Duke and Kentucky. With 2.1 seconds remaining in overtime, Christian Laettner hit a jumper as time expired to give Duke the 104–103 win. The game which was called by Verne Lundquist and Len Elmore, has since been considered by many to be the greatest college basketball game ever played.
April 4	TBS' Saturday afternoon/early evening World Championship Wrestling program is renamed WCW Saturday Night. The main event is Steve Austin defeating The Z-Man in a 2-out-of-3 falls match for the WCW World Television Title.
April 9	Joan Van Ark makes her final regular appearance as Valene Ewing on the CBS drama Knots Landing. Van Ark however, will return for the series finale. This also marks the final appearance of Larry Riley as Frank Williams prior to Riley's death on June 6, 1992.
April 18	Sean McDonough makes his debut as the new lead play–by–play announcer for Major League Baseball telecasts on CBS. Replacing Jack Buck, who was dismissed by the network following the 1991 World Series, McDonough would serve in that capacity alongside analyst Tim McCarver for the final two years of CBS' contract with Major League Baseball.
April 25	ABC broadcasts the series finales of Who's the Boss?, Growing Pains, and MacGyver.
April 29	Batman (1989 film) makes its broadcast television premiere on CBS.
April 30	The Nickelodeon time capsule was buried at Nickelodeon Studios in Orlando, Florida.
May 1	Sesame Street broadcasts its 3,000th episode.
May 19	Vice President of the United States Dan Quayle speaks at the Commonwealth Club in San Francisco. During his speech, he criticizes the Murphy Brown character for "mocking the importance of fathers by bearing a child alone".
May 22	After 30 years, 66-year-old Johnny Carson hosts The Tonight Show on NBC for the 4,531st and last time.
May 25	Jay Leno debuts as host of NBC's The Tonight Show.
May 26–June 1	SportsChannel America airs the last of four consecutive Stanley Cup Finals. ESPN would replace SportsChannel America as the primary American television home for the National Hockey League beginning in the 1992–93 season.
June 1	In New York City, NBC's flagship television station WNBC dropped the "-TV" suffix from its call letters (following the sale in 1988 of its sister radio station WNBC-AM by NBC's then-parent company General Electric) in favor of the new branding slogan "4 New York". The accompanying station image campaign was titled "We're 4 New York" and featured a musical theme composed by Edd Kalehoff. The campaign is revived two times, one is during the 2002 Winter Olympics and once again in 2007.
June 3	Presidential candidate Bill Clinton appears on The Arsenio Hall Show and sits in with the house band on saxophone.
June 6	The music video for Guns N' Roses' power ballad "November Rain" premieres on MTV's Headbangers Ball. November Rain is one of the most expensive music videos ever. In July 2018, the music video would become the first video created prior to YouTube to surpass one billion views. And in February 2023, the music video would reach another milestone after it surpassed two billion views and remaining the oldest song (from the early 1990s) to achieve that feat.
June 10	The first ever edition of the MTV Movie Awards is broadcast.
June 23	Another World broadcasts its first and only primetime episode on NBC, named Summer Desire, right before the Daytime Emmy Awards.
August 7	After Growing Pains actress Tracey Gold loses a massive amount of weight due to anorexia nervosa, she is placed in hospital care. As a result, she is written out of most of the ABC sitcom's final episodes.
August 15	Nickelodeon begins a Saturday night programming block called SNICK.
August 16	Ron Simmons defeats Big Van Vader for the WCW World Heavyweight Championship on TBS' WCW Main Event to become the first recognized black world champion in professional wrestling history.
August 31	The fifth annual SummerSlam event airs on pay-per-view. Taking place in Wembley Stadium, London, England, two days prior, this was the first major World Wrestling Federation pay-per-view to take place outside of North America. The main event saw The British Bulldog defeating Bret Hart to win the WWF Intercontinental Championship.
September 2	TBS airs World Championship Wrestling's Clash of the Champions XX from the Center Stage Theater in Atlanta. The event was not only the 20th time WCW held a Clash of the Champions show but also marked the 20th anniversary of professional wrestling being shown on TBS as Mid-Atlantic Wrestling in 1972. It also was the final wrestling TV appearance for André the Giant, who died several months later. The main event saw the team of Rick Rude, Jake Roberts, Super Invader, and Big Van Vader defeated the team of Sting, Nikita Koloff, and The Steiner Brothers.
September 4	Scared Silent: Ending and Exposing Child Abuse, a one-hour live special hosted by Oprah Winfrey, is simulcast on CBS and NBC. Two nights later, the special is rebroadcast on ABC.
September 4	After 25 years of legal battles, Titicut Follies— a 1967 direct cinema film portraying the treatment of occupants at the Bridgewater State Hospital— is premiered for the first time on PBS.
September 5	Batman: The Animated Series premieres on Fox Kids in a 4:30 p.m. afternoon timeslot. It's soon hailed as a groundbreaking superhero show receiving praise for its writing, art design, voice acting, orchestrated soundtrack, and modernization of its title character's source material. The acclaim led to multiple Daytime Emmy Awards, as well as the Primetime Emmy Award for Outstanding Animated Programming. In December, just three months after its debut, Fox also begins airing episodes of the series on prime-time Sunday evenings (followed by the live-action sitcom Shaky Ground); however, the TV ratings fell short (as the show aired opposite the perennial favorite 60 Minutes), and the series was removed from this time slot in March 1993.
September 12	NBC is the first network to cancel all their Saturday morning cartoons in favor of four shows, Saved by the Bell, California Dreams, NBA Inside Stuff, and Name Your Adventure under the TNBC banner. A weekend version of Today, which debuted on August 1, is also added. Animated programming would not return to NBC until 2006.
September 14	Pamela Anderson makes her first appearance as C. J. Parker on Baywatch in first-run syndication.
September 17	Univision broadcasts the final of the 15th National OTI Festival live from the Gusman Center for the Performing Arts in Miami.
September 27	Marlon Wayans and Alexandra Wentworth join the cast of the Fox sketch comedy show In Living Color. Wayans only joins the cast for 13 episodes, but Wentworth stays full-time for both this and the next season (which would turn out to be the show's fifth and final season).
October 1	Cartoon Network begins its broadcasts with a one-hour special titled Droopy's Guide to the Cartoon Network. The Merrie Melodies short Rhapsody Rabbit was the very first cartoon to be shown on the channel.
October 3	Sinéad O'Connor causes controversy when she rips up a picture of Pope John Paul II on NBC's Saturday Night Live.
October 10	Michael Jackson's concert Live in Bucharest: The Dangerous Tour airs on HBO.
October 11	George Bush, Bill Clinton, and Ross Perot participate in the first 1992 presidential debate hosted by Jim Lehrer of PBS.
October 12	In first-run syndication, James Doohan guest stars as Montgomery Scott in an episode of Star Trek: The Next Generation.
October 13	Hal Bruno of ABC News moderates the 1992 Vice Presidential debate at Georgia Tech.
October 15	Carole Simpson hosts the second of the 1992 presidential debates (becoming the first woman of color to do so). President George H. W. Bush is criticized for checking his watch on camera while being asked a question.
October 17	Kristy McNichol's last episode of Empty Nest, entitled "The Boomerang Affair", is broadcast on NBC. (McNichol would return for the series finale in 1995.)
October 17–24	The World Series is broadcast on CBS for the third consecutive year. The Toronto Blue Jays would ultimately defeat the Atlanta Braves in six games to claim their first ever world championship, as well as the first World Series title for a Canadian based Major League Baseball team.
October 19	The third and final presidential debate is held at Michigan State University.
October 31	The first part of the pilot episode for X-Men, "Night of the Sentinels", airs on Fox Kids as a "sneak preview". The second part would air on November 7. South Korean studio AKOM was hired to animate episodes. X-Men was originally set to premiere over Labor Day weekend in September; however, due to production delays, it was delayed to the end of October. When AKOM turned in the first episode, it contained several animation errors, which they refused to fix. Because of time constraints, the episode was aired in an unfinished form; when Fox re-aired the pilot in early 1993, the errors were corrected. The second episode was submitted just before the deadline, with 50 scenes missing and a single day reserved for editing.
November 1	Texas billionaire Ross Perot acquires blocks of TV time for his presidential campaign.
November 14	Nickelodeon broadcasts the Kids' Choice Awards live for the first time.
November 15–18	The five-hour miniseries, The Jacksons: An American Dream is broadcast in two halves on ABC. Part 1 of the miniseries would become the third highest-rated program broadcast during the week of November 9–15 with a 21.1 rating. Part 2 of the miniseries meanwhile, would become watched by 38.4 million viewers in 22.3 million households, becoming the highest-rated program broadcast during the week of November 16–22. Part 2 would also post a 23.9 rating, and 36 share. Overall, the miniseries is watched in 38.3 million households and posts a 22.3 rating and 33 share.
November 17	Dateline NBC airs an hour-long investigative report titled "Waiting to Explode," which focused on allegations that General Motors' Rounded-Line Chevrolet C/K-Series pickup trucks exploded upon impact when involved in collisions due to the poor design of the vehicle model's fuel tanks. It is also later revealed that the Dateline report had been dishonest about the fuel tanks rupturing and the alleged 30 miles per hour (48 km/h) speed at which the collision was conducted. The actual speed was found to be higher than stated, around 40 miles per hour (64 km/h), and after x-ray examination of the fuel tanks from the C/K pickups used in the televised collision, it was found that they had not ruptured and were intact. GM subsequently filed an anti-defamation/libel lawsuit against NBC after conducting an extensive investigation.
November 18	The Seinfeld episode "The Contest" is broadcast on NBC. Despite its controversy, the episode will win an Emmy Award and be named as the number one episode of all time by TV Guide.
November 21	On TBS, an episode of Captain Planet and the Planeteers titled "A Formula for Hate" becomes the first episode in an American children's animated series to directly deal with the HIV/AIDS pandemic.
November 25	On NBC, Jerry Orbach makes his first appearance as Detective Lennie Briscoe on Law & Order.
December 1	On CBS, The Young and the Restless broadcasts its 5,000th episode. In celebration of this, a Y&R-themed Showcase is presented on The Price is Right, which also airs on CBS.

== Television programs ==
=== Debuts ===
Date	Show	Network
January 4	Nick Arcade	Nickelodeon
January 6	World News Now	ABC
January 10	Hearts Are Wild	CBS
January 17	Tequila and Bonetti	CBS
January 20	The Dennis Miller Show	Syndication
January 25	MTV Sports	MTV
January 27	Inside Politics	CNN
January 29	Nightmare Cafe	NBC
January 31	Billy	ABC
January 31	Capitol Critters	ABC
February 23	I Witness Video	NBC
February 26	Bodies of Evidence	CBS
February 28	Scorch	CBS
February 28	Fish Police	CBS
February 29	The Boys of Twilight	CBS
March 4	The Young Indiana Jones Chronicles	ABC
March 7	The Powers That Be	NBC
March 24	Room for Two	ABC
March 31	Dateline NBC	NBC
April 5	Mann & Machine	NBC
April 5	Stand By Your Man	Fox
April 6	Barney & Friends	PBS
April 17	The Fifth Corner	NBC
April 18	Nick News W-5	Nickelodeon
May 21	The Real World	MTV
May 25	The Tonight Show with Jay Leno	NBC
May 30	Julie	ABC
May 30	Vinnie & Bobby	Fox
June 15	Doctor Dean	NBC
June 15	Grapevine	CBS
June 19	Raven	CBS
June 20	On the Air	ABC
June 21	Down the Shore	Fox
June 27	Red Shoe Diaries	Showtime
June 29	The Grind	MTV
July 1	Def Comedy Jam	HBO
July 8	Melrose Place	Fox
July 20	Human Target	ABC
August 11	Freshman Dorm	CBS
August 15	The Larry Sanders Show	HBO
August 15	Are You Afraid of the Dark?	Nickelodeon
August 15	Roundhouse	Nickelodeon
August 16	Secret Service	NBC
August 23	2000 Malibu Road	CBS
August 25	Covington Cross	ABC
August 27	The Heights	Fox
August 27	Martin	Fox
August 31	Vicki!	Syndication
September 1	Going to Extremes	ABC
September 5	Batman: The Animated Series	Fox Kids
September 5	Goof Troop	Syndication and ABC
September 10	Lamb Chop's Play-Along	PBS
September 11	Likely Suspects	Fox
September 11	The Little Mermaid	CBS Kid TV
September 12	Fievel's American Tails	CBS Kid TV
September 12	The Addams Family	ABC
September 12	Wild West C.O.W.-Boys of Moo Mesa	ABC
September 12	California Dreams	TNBC
September 12	Name Your Adventure	TNBC
September 12	Eek! The Cat	Fox Kids
September 12	Super Dave: Daredevil for Hire	Fox Kids
September 13	Flying Blind	Fox
September 13	Frannie's Turn	CBS
September 13	King Arthur and the Knights of Justice	Syndication
September 13	Conan the Adventurer	Syndication
September 14	Hearts Afire	CBS
September 14	Crossroads	ABC
September 14	That's Amore	Syndication
September 14	Rush Limbaugh: The Television Show	Syndication
September 14	The Whoopi Goldberg Show	Syndication
September 14	ComicView	BET
September 15	American Justice	A&E
September 15	Delta	ABC
September 16	The Hat Squad	CBS
September 16	Beakman's World	Syndication
September 18	Bob	CBS
September 18	The Golden Palace	CBS
September 18	Picket Fences	CBS
September 18	Camp Wilder	ABC
September 18	Final Appeal	NBC
September 18	The Round Table	NBC
September 19	The Amazing Live Sea Monkeys	CBS
September 19	Raw Toonage	CBS
September 19	Renegade	Syndication
September 19	Nickelodeon Guts	Nickelodeon
September 19	The Plucky Duck Show	Fox Kids
September 19	The Edge	Fox
September 19	Here and Now	NBC
September 19	Out All Night	NBC
September 21	Love & War	CBS
September 22	Hangin' with Mr. Cooper	ABC
September 23	Mad About You	NBC
September 24	Street Stories with Ed Bradley	CBS
September 24	Rhythm & Blues	NBC
September 25	What Happened?	NBC
September 26	Dog City	Fox Kids
September 27	Woops!	Fox
September 28	Stunt Dawgs	Syndication
September 30	Laurie Hill	ABC
October 1	ToonHeads	Cartoon Network
October 4	Ghostwriter	PBS
October 4	Great Scott!	Fox
October 5	Born Lucky	Lifetime
October 14	American Heroes & Legends	Showtime
October 31	X-Men	Fox Kids
December 1	The Jackie Thomas Show	ABC
December 27	Shaky Ground	Fox

=== Returning this year ===
Show	Last aired	Previous network	New title	New network	Returning
Barney & the Backyard Gang	1991	Direct-to-video	Barney & Friends	PBS	April 6
The Ben Stiller Show	1990	MTV	Same	Fox	September 27

=== Ending this year ===
Date	Show	Debut
January 3	Pacific Station	1991
January 4	P.S. I Luv U	1991
January 24	Best of the Worst	1991
March 2	James Bond Jr.	1991
March 5	Drexell's Class	1991
March 13	Candid Camera (returned in 1996)	1948
March 13	Hearts Are Wild	1992
March 13	Fish Police	1992
March 13	Scorch	1992
March 14	Capitol Critters	1992
April 3	Nightmare Cafe	1992
April 12	Eerie, Indiana	1991
April 17	Tequila and Bonetti	1992
April 25	Growing Pains	1985
April 25	Who's the Boss?	1984
April 30	The Cosby Show	1984
May 6	Jake and the Fatman	1987
May 6	Sibs	1991
May 9	The Golden Girls	1985
May 13	The Royal Family	1991
May 17	Superboy	1988
May 17	Stand By Your Man	1992
May 21	MacGyver (rebooted in 2016)	1985
May 22	The Tonight Show Starring Johnny Carson	1962
May 30	The Trials of Rosie O'Neill	1990
May 31	Night Court (returned in 2023)	1984
May 31	The Adventures of Mark & Brian	1991
June 1	NHL on SportsChannel America	1988
June 3	Anything but Love	1989
June 26	Club MTV	1987
July 4	Billy	1992
July 4	Julie	1992
July 13	Man of the People	1991
July 14	Mann & Machine	1992
July 22	Dear John	1988
July 24	The Dennis Miller Show	1992
August 8	The Howard Stern Show	1990
September 12	Salute Your Shorts	1991
October 24	Rhythm & Blues	1992
November 5	Saturday Night's Main Event (returned in 2006)	1985
November 6	Square One TV	1987
November 6	Nick Arcade	1992
November 26	The Heights	1992
November 28	Good Morning, Mickey!	1983
November 28	The Amazing Live Sea Monkeys	1992
November 29	Great Scott!	1992
December 1	Wild & Crazy Kids (returned in 2002)	1990
December 2	A Bunch of Munsch	1991
December 5	Fievel's American Tails	1992
December 5	Goof Troop	1992
December 5	Raw Toonage	1992
December 6	Woops!	1992
December 12	The Plucky Duck Show	1992
December 12	Darkwing Duck	1991
December 26	Back to the Future: The Animated Series	1991
December 26	Widget	1990

=== Entering syndication this year ===
A list of programs (current or canceled) that have accumulated enough episodes (between 65 and 100) or seasons (3 or more) to be eligible for off-network syndication and/or basic cable runs.

Show	Seasons	In production	Notes	Sources
American Gladiators	3	Yes	Cable syndication on USA Network.	
Life Goes On	3	Yes	Cable syndication on The Family Channel.	
Murphy Brown	4	Yes		
Quantum Leap	4	Yes	Cable syndication on USA Network.	
Roseanne	4	Yes		
Unsolved Mysteries	4	Yes	Cable syndication on Lifetime.	
The Young Riders	3	No	Cable syndication on The Family Channel.	
The Wonder Years	5	Yes		

=== Changes of network affiliation ===
The following shows aired new episodes on a different network than previous first-run episodes:

Show	Moved from	Moved to
Monday Night Baseball	ABC	ESPN
Hi Honey, I'm Home!	ABC	Nick at Nite
Davis Rules	ABC	CBS
In the Heat of the Night	NBC	CBS
Matlock	NBC	ABC
Tiny Toon Adventures	Syndication	Fox Kids
The Ben Stiller Show	MTV	Fox

=== Made-for-TV movies and miniseries ===
Premiere date	Title	Channel
January 12	Last Wish	ABC
March 2	Woman with a Past	NBC
March 16	Doing Time on Maple Drive	Fox
March 23	Broadway Bound	ABC
May 3	Day-O	NBC
May 31	Still Not Quite Human	Disney Channel
September 27	Obsessed	ABC
September 29	Child of Rage	CBS
November 15–18	The Jacksons: An American Dream	ABC
November 27	Saved by the Bell: Hawaiian Style	NBC
December 6	The Man Upstairs	CBS
December 6	To Grandmother's House We Go	ABC
December 13	Charles and Diana: Unhappily Ever After	ABC
December 26–27	Lincoln	ABC

== Networks and services ==
=== Launches ===
Network	Type	Launch date	Notes	Source
CNN Checkout Channel	Satellite television	February 20		
New England Cable News	Cable television	March 2		
Flix	Cable television	August 1		
VISN/ACTS	Cable television	September		
MOR Music TV	Cable television	September 1		
NY1	Cable television	September 8		
Sci-Fi Channel	Cable television	September 24	The Sci-Fi Channel launches with a broadcast of Star Wars.	
Cartoon Network	Cable television	October 1	The Merrie Melodies short, Rhapsody Rabbit, was the very first cartoon to be broadcast on the network.	

=== Closures ===
Network	Type	End date	Notes	Sources
SportsChannel Los Angeles	Cable and satellite	December 31		

== Television stations ==
=== Sign-ons ===
Date	City of License/Market	Station	Channel	Affiliation	Notes/Ref.
January	Lafayette, Louisiana	W40AV	40	Independent	
January 1	Flagstaff, Arizona	KKTM	13	Independent	
January 18	Twin Falls, Idaho	KIPT	13	PBS	Part of Idaho Public Television
February 21	Bristol, Virginia (Tri-Cities, TN/VA)	W56CT	56	America One	
February 22	Bullhead City, Arizona	K25HD	25	Cornerstone TV	
April 20	Fairbanks, Alaska	K07UU	7	Fox	
May 11	Ellendale, North Dakota	KJRE	19	PBS	Part of Prairie Public Television
June 30	Greenville, North Carolina (New Bern/Washington, North Carolina)	WYDO	14	Fox	
April 2	Providence, Rhode Island	WOST-TV	69	Independent	
April 3	Springfield, Missouri	K08LX	8	Classified ads The Box	
April 9	Sault Ste. Marie, Michigan	WFUP	45	Fox	Satellite of WFQX/Traverse City
May 6	Fresno, California	KKAK	61	Independent	
July 1	Tucson, Arizona	KHRR	40	Telemundo	
July 8	Rocky Mount, North Carolina (Raleigh/Durham, North Carolina)	WRMY	47	Independent	
August 3	Omaha, Nebraska	K65FL	65	HSN	
August 13	Philadelphia, Pennsylvania	WGTW-TV	48	Independent	
August 16	Philadelphia, Pennsylvania	W07CB	7	Channel America / Family Net	
September 11	Fresno, California	KGMC	43	The Box	
September 24	Utica, New York	W27BJ	27	Cornerstone Television	
September 24	Hendersonville/Nashville, Tennessee	WPGD-TV	50	TBN	
October 5	Charleston, South Carolina	WCTP	36	Independent	
October 12	McAllen, Texas (Brownsville/Harlingen, Texas, United States/Matamoros, Tamaulipas, Mexico)	KNVO	48	Univision	
October 15	Miami, Florida	WMLB-TV	35	Independent	
November 1	Indio/Palm Springs, California	K40DB	40	CBS	Translator of KECY/El Centro
November 1	Medford, Oregon	K49DH	49	Main Street TV; HomeNet	
December 12	Longview/Tyler, Texas	K10NT	10	Inspiration Channel	Now KLGV-LD channel 38
Unknown date	Abilene, Texas	K54DT	54	Fox	
Unknown date	Bozeman, Montana	KDBZ-CD	42	NBC	Translator of KTVM
Unknown date	Charlotte Amalie, U.S. Virgin Islands	WBIV-LP	38	Independent	
Unknown date	Colorado Springs, Colorado	K51CE	51	LeSEA	
Unknown date	Lafayette, Louisiana	K46DG	46	Channel America	
Unknown date	Madison, Wisconsin	W08CK	8	Independent	
Unknown date	Wichita, Kansas	K55FS	55	Independent	

=== Network affiliation changes ===
Date	City of License/Market	Station	Channel	Old affiliation	New affiliation	Notes/Ref.
February 24	Marquette, Michigan	WJMN-TV	3	ABC	CBS	
February 24	Marquette, Michigan	WLUC-TV	6	CBS	ABC	
March 15	Green Bay, Wisconsin	WBAY-TV	2	CBS	ABC	
March 15	Green Bay, Wisconsin	WFRV-TV	5	ABC	CBS	
April 2	Bowling Green, Kentucky	WKNT (recalled from WQQB)	40	Independent	Fox	
Unknown date	Auburn, Indiana	W07CL	7	Main Street TV	Network One	

== Births ==
Date	Name	Notability
January 1	Aaron James Murphy	Actor
January 17	Nate Hartley	Actor (Zeke and Luther)
January 19	Logan Lerman	Actor (Jack & Bobby)
January 19	Mac Miller	Rapper, reality television star (Mac Miller and the Most Dope Family). Performed on Late Night with Jimmy Fallon, Today, Late Show with Stephen Colbert, and The Nightly Show with Larry Wilmore (d. 2018)
January 22	James Newman	Actor
January 26	Mercedes Moné	Actress (The Mandalorian) and pro wrestler
January 31	Colby Minifie	Actress
February 1	Kelli Goss	Actress (Big Time Rush, The Young and the Restless, The Ranch)
February 6	Dylan Efron	Actor
February 8	Karle Warren	Actress (Judging Amy)
February 9	Avan Jogia	Canadian actor (Victorious, Twisted)
February 10	Lexi Atkins	Actress
February 10	Karen Fukuhara	Actress (Craig of the Creek, She-Ra and the Princesses of Power, The Boys)
February 11	Taylor Lautner	Actor (Danny Phantom, Cuckoo, Scream Queens, The Twilight Saga)
February 14	Freddie Highmore	Actor (Bates Motel, The Good Doctor)
February 15	Greer Grammer	Actress (Awkward.) and daughter of Kelsey Grammer
February 17	Meaghan Martin	Actress (10 Things I Hate About You, Awkward.) and singer
February 17	Laivan Greene	Actress (All of Us)
February 17	Ziwe Fumudoh	Writer
February 18	Logan Miller	Actor (I'm in the Band, Ultimate Spider-Man)
February 18	Melinda Shankar	Canadian actress
February 18	Juliana Canfield	Actress
February 18	Jacqueline Toboni	Actress
February 19	Kaili Thorne	Actress
February 19	Camille Kostek	Actress
February 19	Paulina Gaitán	Actress
February 26	Toby Sebastian	Actor
February 28	Annie Bovaird	Canadian voice actress (Caillou)
February 29	Caitlin EJ Meyer	Actress
February 29	James Cullen Bressack	Film producer
February 29	Majesty Rose	Singer
February 29	Jessie T. Usher	Actor (Level Up, The Boys)
March 2	Maisie Richardson-Sellers	English actress (Legends of Tomorrow, Of Kings and Prophets)
March 7	Justin Kelly	Canadian actress
March 9	Luis Armand Garcia	Actor (George Lopez)
March 10	Emily Osment	Actress (Hannah Montana, Cleaners, Young & Hungry, Mom, Kick Buttowski: Suburban Daredevil, Family Guy)
March 11	Austin Swift	Actor
March 13	Kaya Scodelario	English actress (Skins)
March 14	Shotzi Blackheart	Pro wrestler
March 14	Kailyn Lowry	TV personality
March 15	Anna Shaffer	English actress (Harry Potter)
March 15	Sosie Bacon	Actress
March 16	Brett Davern	Actress (Cold Case, Awkward)
March 17	John Boyega	Actor
March 23	Vanessa Morgan	Canadian actress
March 25	Elizabeth Lail	Actress (Once Upon a Time, Dead of Summer)
March 26	Haley Ramm	Actress (Without a Trace, Chasing Life)
March 28	Daisy Bevan	Actress
March 30	Caitlin Carver	Actress (The Fosters)
April 4	Alexa Nikolas	Actress (Zoey 101, The Walking Dead)
April 8	Shelby Young	Actress (Days of Our Lives)
April 10	Daisy Ridley	British actress
April 13	Emma Degerstedt	Actress (Unfabulous)
April 18	Chloe Bennet	Actress (Agents of S.H.I.E.L.D.)
April 18	Jacob Fatu	Pro wrestler
April 19	James Scully	Actor
April 24	Doc Shaw	Actor (Tyler Perry's House of Payne, The Suite Life on Deck, Pair of Kings)
April 24	Joe Keery	Actor (Stranger Things)
April 24	Jack Quaid	Actor (The Boys, My Adventures with Superman, Star Trek: Lower Decks, Harvey Girls Forever!)
April 28	Catherine Wayne	Actress
May 4	Courtney Jines	Actress
May 4	Grace Phipps	Actress (The Nine Lives of Chloe King, The Vampire Diaries, Baby Daddy, Scream Queens, Z Nation) and singer
May 4	Ashley Rickards	Actress (One Tree Hill, Awkward, The Flash)
May 7	Alexander Ludwig	Canadian actor (Vikings)
May 8	Ana Mulvoy-Ten	English actress (House of Anubis)
May 8	Olivia Culpo	Actress
May 12	Ali Sepasyar	Actor (Dude, What Would Happen)
May 12	Malcolm David Kelley	Actor (Lost) and rapper
May 15	Clark Beckham	Singer (American Idol)
May 18	Spencer Breslin	Actor (Teamo Supremo, Center of the Universe)
May 19	Sam Smith	English singer
May 20	Jack Gleeson	Irish actor (Game of Thrones)
May 20	Enes Kanter	Basketball player
May 21	Hutch Dano	Actor (Zeke and Luther)
May 21	Olivia Olson	Voice actress (Phineas and Ferb, Adventure Time, The Powerpuff Girls)
May 24	Travis T. Flory	Actor (Everybody Hates Chris)
May 29	Gregg Sulkin	British actor (Wizards of Waverly Place, Faking It, Runaways)
June 3	Jade Cargill	Pro wrestler
June 4	Lux Pascal	Actress
June 6	DeAndre Hopkins	Football player
June 7	Sara Lee	Contestant and winner of WWE Tough Enough (died 2022)
June 10	Kate Upton	Actress and model
June 11	Eugene Simon	English actor (House of Anubis)
June 12	Allie DiMeco	Actress (The Naked Brothers Band)
June 12	Ryan Malgarini	Actor (Gary Unmarried)
June 14	Daryl Sabara	Actor (Weeds, Wizards of Waverly Place, Generator Rex, Ultimate Spider-Man, Ben 10)
June 21	Max Schneider	Actor (How to Rock)
June 23	Kate Melton	Actress (Scooby-Doo)
June 24	Raven Goodwin	Actress (Just Jordan, Good Luck Charlie)
June 26	Jennette McCurdy	Actress (iCarly, Sam & Cat, Between)
July 3	Nathalia Ramos	Spanish actress (House of Anubis)
July 5	Ellen Tamaki	Actress
July 7	Toni Garrn	German model
July 10	Kelley Mack	Actress (The Walking Dead) (d. 2025)
July 13	Dylan Patton	Actor (Days of Our Lives)
July 17	Billie Lourd	Actress (Scream Queens) and daughter of Carrie Fisher
July 17	Harrison Chad	Voice actor (Dora the Explorer, Little Einsteins)
July 20	Jordan Rodrigues	Australian actor (Dance Academy, The Fosters)
July 20	Paige Hurd	Actress
July 22	Selena Gomez	Actress (Barney & Friends, Hannah Montana, Wizards of Waverly Place) and singer
July 28	Spencer Boldman	Actor (Lab Rats)
August 2	Hallie Eisenberg	Actress (Pepsi commercials)
August 2	Jelani Alladin	Actor
August 3	Karlie Kloss	Model
August 4	Dylan Sprouse	Actors (Grace Under Fire, Friends, The Suite Life of Zack & Cody, The Suite Life on Deck, Riverdale)
August 4	Cole Sprouse	Actors (Grace Under Fire, Friends, The Suite Life of Zack & Cody, The Suite Life on Deck, Riverdale)
August 8	Casey Cott	Actor (Riverdale)
August 9	Burkely Duffield	Canadian actor (House of Anubis)
August 11	Tomi Lahren	Host
August 12	Cara Delevingne	English actress, model
August 20	Demi Lovato	Actress (Barney & Friends, As the Bell Rings, Sonny with a Chance, Glee, The X Factor) and singer
August 20	Alex Newell	Actor (Glee) and singer
August 21	Brad Kavanagh	Actor (House of Anubis)
August 21	RJ Mitte	Actor (Breaking Bad) (d. 2026)
August 22	Ari Stidham	Actor (Scorpion)
August 22	Erin Unger	Actress
August 27	Blake Jenner	Actor (Glee)
August 31	Talon Warburton	Actor
September 12	Alexia Fast	Actress
September 14	Penelope Ford	Pro wrestler
September 16	Nick Jonas	Actor (Jonas, Scream Queens) and singer (Jonas Brothers)
September 22	Lauren Patten	Actress
September 27	Sam Lerner	Actor (The Secret Saturdays, Suburgatory, The Goldbergs, Trolls: The Beat Goes On!)
September 27	Jake Burbage	Actor (Dora the Explorer, Grounded for Life)
September 28	Keir Gilchrist	Actor (United States of Tara)
September 28	Skye McCole Bartusiak	Actress (died 2014)
September 30	Ezra Miller	Actor
October 1	Christopher O'Shea	Actor
October 6	Rhyon Nicole Brown	Actress
October 9	Tyler James Williams	Actor (Everybody Hates Chris, Abbott Elementary, Batman: The Brave and the Bold)
October 11	Cardi B	Rapper
October 12	Josh Hutcherson	Actor
October 15	Vincent Martella	Actor (Ned's Declassified School Survival Guide, Everybody Hates Chris, Phineas and Ferb, Milo Murphy's Law)
October 17	Jacob Artist	Actor (Glee)
October 18	Barry Keoghan	Actor
October 19	Taylor Masamitsu	Voice actor (Eubie on Higglytown Heroes)
October 22	Sofia Vassilieva	Actress (Medium)
October 26	Beulah Koale	Actor
October 27	Charles Cottier	Australian actor (Home and Away)
October 28	Lexi Ainsworth	Actress (General Hospital)
October 30	Tequan Richmond	Actor (Everybody Hates Chris, General Hospital) and rapper
October 31	Vanessa Marano	Actress (The Young and the Restless, Scoundrels, Switched at Birth)
November 2	London Elise Moore	Actress
November 4	Jessa Duggar Seewald	Actress (19 Kids and Counting, Counting On) and television personality
November 7	Christopher Tavarez	Actor
November 7	Andrea Londo	Actress
November 12	Macey Cruthird	Actress (Hope & Faith, Two and a Half Men)
November 18	John Karna	Actor (Scream Valley of the Boom)
November 18	Nathan Kress	Actor (iCarly, Star Wars Rebels, Pinky Malinky)
November 23	Miley Cyrus	Actress (Hannah Montana, The Emperor's New School), singer and daughter of Billy Ray Cyrus
November 25	Zack Shada	Actor
November 28	Adam Hicks	Actor (Titus, Zeke and Luther, Jonas, Pair of Kings, Texas Rising, Freakish)
November 28	Cameron Ansell	Canadian voice actor (The Save-Ums!, Arthur, Time Warp Trio)
December 14	Tori Kelly	American singer
December 18	Bridgit Mendler	Actress (Wizards of Waverly Place, Good Luck Charlie, Undateable) and singer
December 23	Spencer Daniels	Actor (Mom)
December 25	Rachel Keller	Actress (Fargo)
December 30	Michael Eric Reid	Actor (Victorious)

== Deaths ==
Date	Name	Age	Notability
January 7	Richard Hunt	40	Puppeteer (The Muppet Show)
January 26	José Ferrer	80	Actor (Newhart recurring role)
February 2	Bert Parks	77	Longtime host of the Miss America beauty pageant
February 20	Dick York	63	Actor (the 1st Darren Stephens on Bewitched)
March 6	Hugh Gibb	76	English drummer and bandleader
March 25	Nancy Walker	69	Actress (Ida on Rhoda, Rosie the Bounty lady)
April 10	Sam Kinison	38	Comedian and actor (Charlie Hoover)
May 12	Robert Reed	59	Actor (Mike Brady on The Brady Bunch)
May 17	Lawrence Welk	89	Accordionist and bandleader (The Lawrence Welk Show)
June 6	Larry Riley	38	Actor (Knots Landing)
June 15	Chuck Menville	52	Animator and writer (The Smurfs)
June 22	Chuck Mitchell	64	Actor (General Hospital)
June 26	Buddy Rogers	71	Professional wrestler
July 9	Eric Sevareid	79	News commentator
October 16	Shirley Booth	94	Actress (Hazel)
October 22	Cleavon Little	53	Actor (Temperatures Rising)
November 7	Jack Kelly	65	Actor (Bart Maverick on Maverick)
November 10	Chuck Connors	71	Actor (Lucas McCain on The Rifleman)
November 22	Sterling Holloway	87	Actor (original voice of Winnie-the-Pooh)
December 18	Mark Goodson	77	Producer of game shows (Match Game, Blockbusters, The Price Is Right)
December 24	Peyo	64	Also known as "Peyo"; Belgian creator of (The Smurfs)

== See also ==
- 1992 in the United States
- List of American films of 1992
