= List of The Tonight Show with Jay Leno episodes (1992–1995) =

Release
- Original network: NBC

Season chronology
- ← Previous Next → 1996–99 episodes

The Tonight Show with Jay Leno is an American late-night talk show hosted by Jay Leno that first aired from May 25, 1992, to May 29, 2009, and resumed its second production on March 1, 2010, until its ending on February 6, 2014, after Conan O'Brien's short tenure. This was the fourth incarnation of the Tonight Show series that began three days after Johnny Carson's tenure came to an end. This is a list of episodes for The Tonight Show with Jay Leno that aired from May 25, 1992, to December 29, 1995.

== 1992 ==
=== May ===
No.	Original release date	Guest(s)	Musical/entertainment guest(s)
1	May 25, 1992	Billy Crystal, Robert Krulwich	Shanice
2	May 26, 1992	Tom Cruise, Kathy Najimy	Simply Red
3	May 27, 1992	Emilio Estevez, Joe Pesci, Paula Poundstone	The Black Crowes
4	May 28, 1992	Don Francisco, Sigourney Weaver	Curtis Stigers
5	May 29, 1992	Mel Gibson, Molly Ivins	Kathleen Battle

=== June ===
No.	Original release date	Guest(s)	Musical/entertainment guest(s)
6	June 1, 1992	Bill Geist, Jean-Claude Van Damme, Ron Silver	Blue Man Group
7	June 2, 1992	Gabrielle Carteris, Christian Slater, Gene Siskel, Roger Ebert	Mr. Big
8	June 3, 1992	Louie Anderson, Harrison Ford, Star Jones	Jon Secada
9	June 4, 1992	Kadeem Hardison, Rene Russo, Vincent Spano	Rodney Crowell
10	June 5, 1992	Susan Dey, Bernard Shaw, Henry Cho	Celia Cruz, Tito Puente
11	June 8, 1992	Joe Mantegna, Spalding Gray, Vincent Spano	Jimmie Dale Gilmore
12	June 9, 1992	Katey Sagal, Sam Donaldson	The Smithereens
13	June 10, 1992	Goldie Hawn, Michael Chiklis	BeBe Winans and CeCe Winans
14	June 11, 1992	Patricia Brown, Lily Tomlin, Kurt Russell	Roy Hargrove
15	June 12, 1992	Bill Cosby, Nina Totenberg, Thora Birch	Joe Public
16	June 15, 1992	Beau Bridges, Jane Pratt	The cast of Guys and Dolls
17	June 16, 1992	Danny Glover, Jason Alexander, Jeff Rothpan	Tom Cochrane
18	June 17, 1992	Robert Altman, Gabrielle Carteris, Katherine Buckley	Tracy Chapman
19	June 18, 1992	Phil Donahue, David Lynch	Dr. John
20	June 19, 1992	Charles Osgood, Wesley Snipes	Richard Marx
21	June 22, 1992	Peter Onorati, Jeff Stilson	The Chieftains with Roger Daltrey and Nanci Griffith
22	June 23, 1992	Penny Marshall, P. J. O'Rourke	Marilyn Horne
23	June 24, 1992	Tim Burton, Pam Stone	Black Sheep
24	June 25, 1992	Ray Liotta, Kevin Nealon, Eric Mendelsohn	Ottmar Liebert
25	June 26, 1992	Helena Bonham Carter, John Chancellor	Toad the Wet Sprocket
26	June 29, 1992	Tom Hanks, Brian Ross	Delbert McClinton
27	June 30, 1992	Marlee Matlin, Margaret Smith	Kathy Troccoli

=== July ===
No.	Original release date	Guest(s)	Musical/entertainment guest(s)
28	July 1, 1992	Geena Davis, Darren E. Burrows	TBA
29	July 2, 1992	Stan Winston, Merrill Markoe	Cowboy Junkies
30	July 3, 1992	Kellie Martin, Michael Brandon	Melissa Etheridge
31	July 6, 1992	Cynthia Heimel, Grant Show, Christian Laettner	They Might Be Giants
32	July 7, 1992	Joey Lawrence, John McLaughlin	Gipsy Kings
33	July 8, 1992	Eddie Murphy, Paula Poundstone	En Vogue
34	July 9, 1992	Kim Basinger, Kathleen Hall Jamieson	James Taylor
35	July 10, 1992	D.B. Sweeney, Rosie O'Donnell	Delfeayo Marsalis
36	July 13, 1992	Ken Hakuta, Mary Wickes	Jodeci
37	July 14, 1992	Richard Dean Anderson, Warren Hutcherson	Céline Dion
Tom Brokaw and Paula Poundstone appear live from the 1992 Democratic National Convention
38	July 15, 1992	Robert Foxworth, Reginald Hudlin	Mary Chapin Carpenter
Tom Brokaw and Paula Poundstone appear live from the 1992 Democratic National Convention
39	July 16, 1992	Richard Jeni, Helen Hunt	Annie Lennox
Tom Brokaw and Paula Poundstone appear live from the 1992 Democratic National Convention
40	July 17, 1992	Paul Reiser, Michael Kinsley	Sounds of Blackness
41	July 20, 1992	Kelsey Grammer, Robert Zemeckis, Jeff Foxworthy	Marcus Roberts
42	July 21, 1992	James Woods, Marlon Wayans	The Cages
43	July 22, 1992	Dinah Manoff, Tommy Tune, Irving R. Levine	Gang Starr
44	July 23, 1992	Lily Tomlin, Rob Morrow, Mark Schiff	Wilson Phillips
45	July 24, 1992	Anne-Marie Johnson, Howard Stern	Lyle Lovett

=== August ===
No.	Original release date	Guest(s)	Musical/entertainment guest(s)
46	August 10, 1992	Clint Eastwood, Star Jones, Mark Lenzi	The B-52's
47	August 11, 1992	Paula Poundstone, Jamey Sheridan	The Neville Brothers
48	August 12, 1992	Kathleen Hall Jamieson, Dana Ashbrook	Joe Cocker
49	August 13, 1992	Oscar De La Hoya, Steven Weber	B.B. King, Dr. John, Buddy Guy, Fran Christina, Kim Wilson
50	August 14, 1992	Brian De Palma, kid reporter Sean Donahue, Mark Roberts	Bemshi
51	August 18, 1992	Ian McKellen, Osceola High School football coach Clinton Gore	Tevin Campbell, Shirley Horn
Jim Morris and Paula Poundstone appear live from the 1992 Republican National Convention
52	August 19, 1992	Ted Wass, Brandon Lee	Los Lobos
Tom Brokaw and Paula Poundstone appear live from the 1992 Republican National Convention
53	August 20, 1992	Kate Jackson, Sue Grafton	Yolanda Adams
Tom Brokaw and Paula Poundstone appear live from the 1992 Republican National Convention
54	August 21, 1992	Frances Fisher, Andrea Mitchell, Jim Edwards	Béla Fleck and the Flecktones
55	August 24, 1992	Kelly Coffield, Powers Boothe, teenage cookie entrepreneur Jill Shieman	Herbie Hancock, Wayne Shorter, Ron Carter, Wallace Roney, Tony Williams
56	August 25, 1992	Sarah Jessica Parker, Larry Miller, Eleanor Clift	R. Kelly and Public Announcement
57	August 26, 1992	Brian Dennehy, David Lynch, Norm Macdonald	Michael Feinstein
58	August 27, 1992	James Caan, Cathy Moriarty, Al Lubel	Eddie Palmieri
59	August 28, 1992	Nicolas Cage, Bob Costas, Regina Taylor	Curtis Stigers
60	August 31, 1992	Norman D. Golden II, Janine Turner, Paul Rodriguez	Herb Alpert

=== September ===
No.	Original release date	Guest(s)	Musical/entertainment guest(s)
61	September 1, 1992	Rutger Hauer, Miriam Margolyes	Cast of Forever Plaid, Fu-Schnickens
62	September 2, 1992	Edward Furlong, Jean Smart, Stu Trivax	Jon Secada
63	September 3, 1992	James Woods, Jennifer Grey	David Sanborn
64	September 4, 1992	Lily Tomlin, Andrew Shue	The Wailing Souls
65	September 7, 1992	Dana Carvey, Joanna Cassidy	Sophie B. Hawkins
66	September 8, 1992	Mary Tyler Moore, Peter Riegert	Joe Henderson
67	September 9, 1992	Patrick Duffy, Dermot Mulroney, Henry Cho	Waylon Jennings
68	September 10, 1992	Tim Daly, Jack Valenti, Michael Treanor, Max Elliott Slade, Chad Power	Dirty Dozen Brass Band
69	September 11, 1992	Matthew Modine, Tom Dreesen, Cokie Roberts	The Robert Cray Band
70	September 14, 1992	Delta Burke, Mark Curry, Brian Kelly	Joan Armatrading
71	September 15, 1992	Jerry Seinfeld, Kyle Chandler	David Byrne
72	September 16, 1992	Juliette Lewis, Jake Johannsen, Eric Alterman	Doug Stone
73	September 17, 1992	Martin Short, Morris Chestnut	Linda Ronstadt
74	September 18, 1992	Fred Savage, Paul Provenza, Amy Locane	Lincoln Center Jazz Orchestra featuring Wynton Marsalis
75	September 21, 1992	Paul Reiser, Scott Bakula	Blue Man Group
76	September 22, 1992	Tom Selleck, Roger Kabler	Garth Brooks
77	September 23, 1992	Will Smith, Steven Weber	The Cages
78	September 24, 1992	Billy Crystal, Kathryn Harrold	Linda Hopkins, Albert Collins
79	September 25, 1992	Julianne Phillips, Ron Richards, Madeleine Stowe	The Rembrandts
80	September 28, 1992	Jason Priestley, Judith Ivey, Dennis Wolfberg	Steve Wariner, Angélique Kidjo
81	September 29, 1992	Faye Dunaway, Kadeem Hardison, Ed Koch	CeCe Peniston
82	September 30, 1992	Dustin Hoffman, Fred Stoller	Graham Parker, Robben Ford

=== October ===
No.	Original release date	Guest(s)	Musical/entertainment guest(s)
83	October 1, 1992	Jack Lemmon, Bruce Davison	Michael Bolton
84	October 2, 1992	Norman Schwarzkopf Jr., Wendy Liebman	Lindsey Buckingham
85	October 5, 1992	Emilio Estevez, Tom Magliozzi, Ray Magliozzi, John Leguizamo	Collin Raye
86	October 6, 1992	Tom Skerritt, Anthony Griffith, Clark Duke	Michael Penn
87	October 7, 1992	Tim Robbins, Malcolm-Jamal Warner, Margaret Smith	Tony Bennett
88	October 8, 1992	Cindy Crawford, Kevin Spacey, Tim Russert	Gloria Estefan
89	October 9, 1992	Keenen Ivory Wayans, Jack Scalia	Morrissey
90	October 12, 1992	Neil Patrick Harris, Charlie Hill, Edie McClurg	Motörhead
91	October 13, 1992	Richard Dean Anderson, Margaret Smith, Quentin Tarantino	Pat Metheny
92	October 14, 1992	Jason Alexander, Brett Leake, Tabitha Soren	John Lee Hooker and John P. Hammond, Ottmar Liebert
93	October 15, 1992	Kirk Douglas, Ben Stiller	George Strait
94	October 16, 1992	Steven Seagal, Al Franken	Ramones
95	October 26, 1992	Alan King, Blair Brown, Jann Wenner, Michael Bolton	Mary's Danish
96	October 27, 1992	Kelly Coffield, Lesley Ann Warren, John McCririck	Steel Pulse
97	October 28, 1992	A Martinez, Chuck Martin, Mario Thomas, Joe Bob Briggs	Robert Palmer
98	October 29, 1992	P. J. O'Rourke, Dudley Moore, Tom Scott	Roxette
99	October 30, 1992	Kirstie Alley, Jimmy Connors, Stevie Ray Fromstein	Morris Day

=== November ===
No.	Original release date	Guest(s)	Musical/entertainment guest(s)
100	November 2, 1992	Bill Cosby, Luke Perry, John McLaughlin	Kenny Loggins
101	November 4, 1992	Marilu Henner, Paula Poundstone, Riddick Bowe	Al Jarreau
102	November 5, 1992	Jeff Goldblum, Robert Pastorelli, Fran Drescher	10,000 Maniacs
103	November 6, 1992	Paul Hogan, Rita Rudner, Mark Curry	Vince Gill
104	November 9, 1992	Mark Harmon, Cast of The Real Live Brady Bunch, Ed Koch	Mary J. Blige
105	November 10, 1992	Gene Hackman, Jim Belushi, Holly Robinson	Patty Smyth
106	November 11, 1992	Burt Reynolds, Catherine Deneuve	Ephraim Lewis
107	November 12, 1992	Andy García, Max Alexander, Kim Wayans	Billy Dean
108	November 13, 1992	Elle Macpherson, Phil Donahue	Patti LaBelle
109	November 16, 1992	Marlee Matlin, John Sununu, Geechy Guy	Sounds of Blackness
110	November 17, 1992	John Goodman, Jeff Rothpan	Liza Minnelli, Julian Joseph
111	November 18, 1992	George Carlin, Siegfried & Roy	Ricky Van Shelton
112	November 19, 1992	Jason Priestley, Jack Palance, Steven Wright	Youssou N'Dour
113	November 20, 1992	Virginia Madsen, Mark Roberts	Harry Connick Jr.
114	November 23, 1992	Michael Caine, Sara Gilbert	TLC
115	November 24, 1992	James Woods, Julia Louis-Dreyfus	Arc Angels
116	November 25, 1992	Joe Mantegna, Kristoff St. John	Richard Marx
117	November 26, 1992	Kelsey Grammer, Bob Bakker	Peter Himmelman, Sarah Chang
118	November 27, 1992	Bob Hope, Michael Tucker, John Wing	Darlene Love and Ronnie Spector
119	November 30, 1992	Jaleel White, Steve Kelley, Anna Nicole	EPMD and Das EFX

=== December ===
No.	Original release date	Guest(s)	Musical/entertainment guest(s)
120	December 1, 1992	Reba McEntire, Jay Thomas, Ann Magnuson	N/A
121	December 2, 1992	John Larroquette, Ben Stiller	Michael W. Smith, Charlie Haden Quartet West
122	December 3, 1992	Judge Reinhold, Jack Coen, Maria Sansone	Leon Redbone
123	December 4, 1992	Bill Cosby, Carol Leifer	After 7
124	December 7, 1992	Patricia Heaton, Mario Joyner	Neil Diamond
125	December 8, 1992	Billy Connolly, George Foreman	Céline Dion
126	December 9, 1992	Demi Moore, Ted Shackelford	Clint Black
127	December 10, 1992	Mel Gibson, Patrick Stewart	Bonnie Raitt and Charles Brown
128	December 11, 1992	Roseanne Arnold, Anthony Edwards	k.d. lang
129	December 14, 1992	Jeremy Irons, Joan Cusack	Randy Travis
130	December 15, 1992	5-year-old chess champion Cory Evans, Christine Lahti, David Alan Grier	Peter Cetera and Chaka Khan
131	December 16, 1992	Martin Lawrence, Kevin Pollak, Pam Stone, Lance Solo	EMF
132	December 17, 1992	Franklin Ajaye, Sheila Kelley	Barry Manilow
133	December 18, 1992	Charles S. Dutton, Bill Engvall	Amy Grant
134	December 21, 1992	Barry Levinson, Peg Phillips, Park Overall	The Jeff Healey Band
135	December 22, 1992	Kenneth Branagh	John Corbett, Tevin Campbell
136	December 23, 1992	Robin Williams, kid movie reviewer Paul Jones	Shirley Caesar
137	December 28, 1992	Phil Hartman, Elijah Wood	John Wesley Harding
138	December 29, 1992	Shirley MacLaine, Orestes Lorenzo Perez, Sandi Genova	Me Phi Me
139	December 30, 1992	Garry Shandling, Christy Turlington	Tom Cochrane
140	December 31, 1992	Phil Hartman, Barry Humphries, Cathy Ladman	Morris Day
"Welcome 1993" special

== 1993 ==
=== January ===
No.	Original release date	Guest(s)	Musical/entertainment guest(s)
141	January 4, 1993	Tom Selleck, Rita Rudner	Joe Satriani
142	January 5, 1993	Rob Lowe, Sue Kolinsky	G.E. Smith and The Saturday Night Live Band
143	January 6, 1993	Jack Lemmon, Mary McDonnell	Kenny G
144	January 7, 1993	Spike Lee, Dennis Wolfberg, Edie McClurg	Dixie Dregs
145	January 8, 1993	Carol Burnett, Meat Loaf	Itzhak Perlman
146	January 11, 1993	Tom Arnold, Halle Berry	Charles & Eddie
147	January 12, 1993	Peter Horton, Larry Miller	Tori Amos
148	January 13, 1993	Craig T. Nelson, Marisa Tomei	Faith No More
149	January 14, 1993	Steve Guttenberg, Mariel Hemingway, Ellen DeGeneres	Gary Lakes
150	January 15, 1993	Katie Couric, William Safire, Paula Poundstone	Neil Young
151	January 18, 1993	Faith Ford, Fisher Stevens	Shai
Paula Poundstone reports from the Clinton inauguration in Washington, DC
152	January 19, 1993	Penelope Ann Miller, Jack Coen	John Cale
Paula Poundstone reports from the Clinton inauguration in Washington, DC
153	January 20, 1993	Marcello Mastroianni, Cynthia Stevenson	Cirque du Soleil
Paula Poundstone reports from the Clinton inauguration in Washington, DC
154	January 21, 1993	Jean-Claude Van Damme, Michael Moore	Conway Twitty
155	January 22, 1993	Susan Sarandon, Chris O'Donnell	Soul Asylum
156	January 25, 1993	Marlee Matlin, Daniel Baldwin	Hank Williams Jr.
157	January 26, 1993	Harry Hamlin, Terry Bradshaw	Gloria Estefan
158	January 27, 1993	Tony Danza, Helen Shaver	Mitch Malloy
159	January 28, 1993	Bob Costas, Duff	Garth Brooks
160	January 29, 1993	Emilio Estevez, Richard Jeni	k.d. lang

=== February ===
No.	Original release date	Guest(s)	Musical/entertainment guest(s)
161	February 1, 1993	Troy Aikman, John McLaughlin	Shawn Colvin
162	February 2, 1993	Kiefer Sutherland, Perry King	Rachelle Ferrell
163	February 3, 1993	Jerry Seinfeld, Stephanie Seymour	Larry Gatlin
164	February 4, 1993	Jimmy Carter, Maxine Jeffries	Khaled and Don Was
165	February 5, 1993	Jodie Foster, Paul Reiser	Albert Collins
166	February 8, 1993	Bill Cosby, Marilu Henner	Guy Clark, Emmylou Harris, and Los Lobos
167	February 9, 1993	Tim Allen, Lucie Arnaz	Harry Connick Jr.
168	February 10, 1993	Julia Louis-Dreyfus, Margaret Smith	Tom Jones
169	February 11, 1993	Ross Perot, Roger Kabler	Marky Mark and the Funky Bunch with Donnie Wahlberg
170	February 12, 1993	Richard Gere, Richard Carter	Wynton Marsalis
171	February 15, 1993	Delta Burke, Dan Cortese	Duran Duran
172	February 16, 1993	Joan Embery, Harold Ramis	Tammy Wynette and Lyle Lovett
173	February 17, 1993	Jason Alexander, Lara Flynn Boyle	Orquesta de la Luz
174	February 18, 1993	Gene Siskel and Roger Ebert, Mark Pitta	Emerson, Lake & Palmer
175	February 19, 1993	Pat Sajak, champion prune eater Michael McCasland	Suzanne Vega
176	February 22, 1993	Jeff Daniels, Carrot Top	Brooks and Dunn
177	February 23, 1993	Martin Mull, Kennedy	Boyz II Men
178	February 24, 1993	James Woods, Michael Richards	Kevin Eubanks
179	February 25, 1993	David Lynch, Mimi Rogers	Peter Gabriel
180	February 26, 1993	Bob Saget, Julia Sweeney	Travis Tritt

=== March ===
No.	Original release date	Guest(s)	Musical/entertainment guest(s)
181	March 1, 1993	Stephen Rea, Michael Moore, good Samaritan law student John Leslie	Cirque de Soleil
182	March 2, 1993	Rosanna Arquette, Jeff Rothpan, Bill Duke	Alan Jackson
183	March 3, 1993	Michael Douglas, Ed Marinaro	Al Jarreau
184	March 4, 1993	Penny Marshall, D.B. Sweeney	Jude Cole
185	March 5, 1993	Tom Snyder, Gregg Rogell	Dolly Parton
186	March 15, 1993	Lee Iacocca, Mark Roberts	Michael Feinstein
187	March 16, 1993	Denzel Washington, Paula Poundstone	Elvis Costello and The Brodsky Quartet
188	March 17, 1993	Jane Seymour, Dermot Mulroney	Bon Jovi
189	March 18, 1993	Vendela Kirsebom, Jay Thomas	Kathy Mattea
190	March 19, 1993	James Garner, David Heil	Screaming Trees
191	March 22, 1993	Patrick Stewart, Lea Thompson, Jonathan Katz	Chanté Moore
192	March 23, 1993	Mark Harmon, Jake Johannsen	Willie Nelson
193	March 24, 1993	John Goodman, Tonight Show Comedy Challenge winner Hank McGill	Lyle Lovett
194	March 25, 1993	Don Johnson, Jane Pratt	Paul Weller
195	March 26, 1993	Anthony Hopkins, Henry Winkler	Dwight Yoakam
196	March 29, 1993	Tom Arnold, Duff	Michelle Wright
197	March 30, 1993	Andie MacDowell, Charlie Sheen, Carrot Top	The Samples
198	March 31, 1993	Cybill Shepherd, Phil Hartman	Lou Rawls with Phoebe Snow

=== April ===
No.	Original release date	Guest(s)	Musical/entertainment guest(s)
199	April 1, 1993	Katey Sagal	George Wallace
200	April 2, 1993	Rhea Perlman, Warren Hutcherson	Bryan Adams
Baseball Fans' Spring Training
201	April 5, 1993	Woody Harrelson, Holly Hunter	Brian May
Headlines
202	April 6, 1993	James Carville, Sam McMurray	Lorrie Morgan
Unknown Mysteries of the Unexplained
203	April 7, 1993	Michael Palin, Jack Coen	Wendy Moten
Take a Wild Guess
204	April 8, 1993	Bob Costas, Carl Reiner	Lauren Christy
The Crying Game
205	April 9, 1993	Chuck Norris, Victoria Jackson	Yolanda Adams
Politics Tonight
206	April 12, 1993	Alan Alda, Carol Leifer	Restless Heart
Ways to Cut Expenses at Euro Disney
207	April 13, 1993	Roseanne Arnold, A Martinez	Buddy Guy and Paul Rogers
Jay's body double, NBC Made-for-TV Movie of the Week
208	April 14, 1993	Dudley Moore, Mary Stuart Masterson	10,000 Maniacs
Headlines, Rules of the Senate Pool
209	April 15, 1993	Shelley Long, Eric Stoltz	Nanci Griffith
Last Minute Tax Tips
210	April 16, 1993	Ellen Barkin, Jeff Stilson	Leonard Cohen
Finish the TV Theme Song Lyrics
211	April 26, 1993	Danny Aiello, Ivan Reitman	The Modern Jazz Quartet
Headlines; Conan O'Brien is introduced as the next host of Late Night during the monologue
212	April 27, 1993	Jason Priestley, Dominick Dunne	Joe Diffie
The Tonight Show's Little Big Book of Romantic Phrases
213	April 28, 1993	Matthew Broderick, George Steinbrenner	Jethro Tull
What's Your Beef?
214	April 29, 1993	William Baldwin, Carol Siskind	Digable Planets
100 Days Ago vs. Today
215	April 30, 1993	Joey Lawrence, Ellen DeGeneres	Bryan Ferry
Take a Wild Guess

=== May ===
No.	Original release date	Guest(s)	Musical/entertainment guest(s)
216	May 3, 1993	Sigourney Weaver, P.J. O'Rourke	Bruce Hornsby
217	May 4, 1993	Kevin Kline, Louie Anderson	Suzy Bogguss
Regular College vs. Sex College
218	May 5, 1993	Ross Perot, Cuba Gooding Jr.	Silk
Tales From the Prom
219	May 6, 1993	Paul Reiser, 8-year-old iguana CPR performer Alex Shindel	Billy Ray Cyrus
Turn-ons and Turn-offs
220	May 7, 1993	Eric Idle, Paulina Porizkova	Poison
Mother's Day Cards
221	May 10, 1993	Keanu Reeves, Niki Taylor	David Bowie with Al B. Sure!
Headlines
222	May 11, 1993	Cindy Crawford, Fred Savage	Regina Belle
Wedding Insurance
223	May 12, 1993	Bob Hope, Mercedes Ruehl	Vince Gill
28th Annual Academy of Country Music Awards
224	May 13, 1993	Marilu Henner, Stephen Baldwin	Sting
Psychological Problems of Dogs
225	May 14, 1993	Tatum O'Neal, Michael E. Knight	Tina Turner
Items from The Duller Image
226	May 17, 1993	Paula Poundstone, Fred Roggin	Cast of The Who's Tommy
Headlines
227	May 18, 1993	Jaleel White, Mark Schiff	Chris Isaak
Bad Things vs. Good Things
228	May 19, 1993	Michael Richards, Valeria Golino	K.T. Oslin
Take a Wild Guess
229	May 20, 1993	Cast of Cheers (Ted Danson, Kelsey Grammer, Woody Harrelson, Rhea Perlman, John Ratzenberger, George Wendt), James Burrows, Glen Charles	Judy Hart Angelo and Gary Portnoy
Live from the Bull & Finch Pub in Boston; Cheers Trivia Quiz; Cheers vs. After Cheers
230	May 21, 1993	Jeff Bridges, Kathleen Madigan	Branford Marsalis
231	May 24, 1993	Walter Cronkite, Carrot Top	Cast of Jesus Christ Superstar
Headlines
232	May 25, 1993	Billy Crystal	The Kinks
233	May 26, 1993	James Woods, Gary Hart	Patty Loveless
Regular Woodstock vs. Conservative Woodstock
234	May 27, 1993	Sylvester Stallone, Charles Cozart	Tonto Tonto
Secrets of the Supreme Court
235	May 28, 1993	Kevin Pollak, Judy Woodruff	Jon Secada
Your Worst Nightmare
236	May 31, 1993	Carol Burnett, Kelly Macdonald	Hal Ketchum
Headlines

=== June ===
No.	Original release date	Guest(s)	Musical/entertainment guest(s)
237	June 1, 1993	Garry Shandling, Samantha Mathis	Gin Blossoms
Lofty Goals vs. Harsh Reality
238	June 2, 1993	Richard Benjamin, Jim Morris	Kenny G
Regular Government vs. Hollywood Government
239	June 3, 1993	Bob Dole, Pat Hazell	Guru's Jazzmatazz
Problems with New Military Recruits, Jay settles a bet with Tommy Lasorda
240	June 4, 1993	Maury Povich, James Wilder	P.M. Dawn
What's Your Excuse?
241	June 7, 1993	Laura Dern, Jeff Foxworthy	Mary Chapin Carpenter
Headlines
242	June 8, 1993	Jason Alexander, Mary Matalin	Suede
Good Impression vs. Bad Impression
243	June 9, 1993	John Lithgow, Stu Trivax	Betty Carter
244	June 10, 1993	Richard Dean Anderson, Ahmad Rashad	Janis Ian
245	June 11, 1993	Ted Danson, Leeza Gibbons	Johnny Mathis
New Children's Books
246	June 14, 1993	John Riggi, Michael Jeter	Barry Manilow
Pronunciation of Prince's New Name
247	June 15, 1993	Jeff Goldblum, Spam carving contest winner Russ Leno	X
Tonight Show Travel Tips
248	June 16, 1993	Gene Siskel and Roger Ebert, Laurence Fishburne	Billy Ocean
Cracker Jack Prize Contest, Other Things That Irritate Drivers
249	June 17, 1993	Arnold Schwarzenegger, Kathy Buckley	Kevin Welch
250	June 18, 1993	Drew Carey, Austin O'Brien	Natalie Cole
Regular Dad vs. Dysfunctional Dad, Excuses for Misdiagnosing a Living Person as Dead
251	June 21, 1993	Matthew Modine	Gloria Estefan, Marc Shaiman
Headlines
252	June 22, 1993	Patrick Duffy, Tommy Morrison	Kiri Te Kanawa
Other Politician Relatives
253	June 23, 1993	Deborah Norville, Chuck Martin	Michael Damian
Tonight Show's Most Wanted
254	June 24, 1993	Don Johnson, Pauly Shore	Chanté Moore
Lesser-Known Summer Movies
255	June 25, 1993	Victoria Jackson, pyro-barber Warren Lewis	Willie Nelson
Take a Wild Guess

=== July ===
No.	Original release date	Guest(s)	Musical/entertainment guest(s)
256	July 5, 1993	Terry Bradshaw, Steven Wright	Chris LeDoux
Jay addresses the death of his mother
257	July 6, 1993	Daniel Stern, George Foreman	Black 47
Jay's valet Charles, Headlines
258	July 7, 1993	Ally Sheedy, Dom Irrera	Cyndi Lauper
Jay's valet Charles, Ask Jay Anything
259	July 8, 1993	Sam Neill, Quentin Crisp	Aaron Neville
What Last Night's Audience Would Do with $110 Million
260	July 9, 1993	Tom Hanks, William Wegman	Sade
261	July 12, 1993	Richard Simmons, Kathryn Harrold	Radney Foster
Clinton's trip to Japan
262	July 13, 1993	Kenneth Branagh, Brian Kiley	Robert Hurst
Police Blotter
263	July 14, 1993	John Chancellor, Rita Wilson	Marc Cohn
Genius vs. Non-Genius
264	July 15, 1993	Sarah Jessica Parker, Spalding Gray	Bell Biv DeVoe
Strange Dreams
265	July 16, 1993	Jeanne Tripplehorn	Rod Stewart
Miracle Nose
266	July 19, 1993	Jane Curtin, Robert Sean Leonard	Joffrey Ballet
Headlines
267	July 20, 1993	Ron Reagan, Jimmie Walker	Wynonna Judd
Finish the TV Theme Song Lyrics
268	July 21, 1993	Rosie O'Donnell, Chris Farley	Maria McKee
NBC's Intellectual Property
269	July 22, 1993	Charles Grodin, Bill Maher	Rosanne Cash
Book Beat
270	July 23, 1993	Gene Hackman, Roberto Benigni	Living Colour
How Your Tonight Show Works
271	July 26, 1993	Richard Lewis, Cathy Guisewite	Exposé
Headlines
272	July 27, 1993	Sandra Bernhard, Anthony LaPaglia	B.B. King with Buddy Guy
Jay calls psychic hotlines to ask about the late night wars
273	July 28, 1993	Mel Brooks, Bertice Berry	Steve Miller Band
Ask Jay Anything
274	July 29, 1993	Jason Alexander, Merrill Markoe	Clannad
Fairy Tale vs. Real Life
275	July 30, 1993	Harrison Ford, Ed McMahon	Pete Townshend

=== August ===
No.	Original release date	Guest(s)	Musical/entertainment guest(s)
276	August 2, 1993	Mike Myers, Al Lubel	Michael McDonald
Headlines
277	August 3, 1993	Jean-Claude Van Damme, Rip Torn	Oleta Adams
Tonight Show's Most Wanted
278	August 4, 1993	Robert Downey Jr., Matthew Lesko	Clint Black
279	August 5, 1993	Kirk Douglas, Norm Macdonald	Taylor Dayne
Childhood Memories
280	August 6, 1993	Robert Townsend, Daisy Fuentes	Steve Vai
281	August 9, 1993	Anthony Young, Lisa Niemi	James Taylor
Headlines
282	August 10, 1993	Paula Poundstone, Fred Roggin	Céline Dion with Clive Griffin
Jay's Friends & Family
283	August 11, 1993	Rob Schneider, Mark Pitta	Ronny Cox
Take a Wild Guess
284	August 12, 1993	Phil Hartman, Norm Crosby	Billy Idol
Good Luck vs. Bad Luck
285	August 13, 1993	James Woods, Jimmy Brogan	Johnny Clegg & Savuka
New Pet Products
286	August 23, 1993	Mel Gibson, Martin Yan	Randy Travis
Headlines; Jay introduces the new set
287	August 24, 1993	Madeline Kahn, George Wallace	Daniel Lanois
Jay calls the police chief of Vinton, Louisiana
288	August 25, 1993	Joe Mantegna, Norm Crosby	Terence Trent D'Arby with Des'ree
Regular Dad vs. Hollywood Dad
289	August 26, 1993	Patrick Swayze, Ian McKellen	Patty Smyth
Super Hero Health Plan
290	August 27, 1993	Diane Keaton, Jack Coen	Tony! Toni! Toné!
Unknown Mysteries of the Unexplained
291	August 30, 1993	Luke Perry	Garth Brooks
Headlines
292	August 31, 1993	Christian Slater	Harry Connick Jr.
Rejected Tonight Show Openings; Jay's desk is spray painted with "Dave!" (referencing last night's Late Show with David Letterman premiere)

=== September ===
No.	Original release date	Guest(s)	Musical/entertainment guest(s)
293	September 1, 1993	Bill Cosby, John Mendoza	The Proclaimers
The Menendez Brothers Show
294	September 2, 1993	Ross Perot, Kevin Nealon	UB40
Classic TV vs. Updated Version
295	September 3, 1993	Jason Priestley, Penny Marshall, Mark Roberts	SWV
Edge Re-Caffeinated Coffee
296	September 6, 1993	John Larroquette, Pat Hazell	Jimmie Dale Gilmore with Natalie Merchant
Headlines
297	September 7, 1993	Jay Thomas, Andrei Codrescu	Diamond Rio
Jaywalking
298	September 8, 1993	Dennis Hopper, Barry Bonds	Pat Benatar
Finish the TV Theme Song Lyrics
299	September 9, 1993	Kathleen Turner, Pat Riley, Jack Coen	N/A
Magazine Collector's Issues
300	September 10, 1993	Roy Scheider, John Wing	Kenny Loggins
How Your Tonight Show Works
301	September 13, 1993	Burt Reynolds, Sinbad	Vince Gill
Edd announces the birth of his daughter
302	September 14, 1993	Tim Allen, The Mommies	Kris Kross
Back to School Items
303	September 15, 1993	Jerry Seinfeld, Halle Berry	Ray Charles
Police Blotter
304	September 16, 1993	Andy García, cabbie film critics Bucky and Vinny	George Benson
305	September 17, 1993	Will Smith, Gabriel Byrne	Toni Braxton
Fifteen Seconds of Fame
306	September 20, 1993	Dame Edna, Willard Scott	Elton John
The Tonight Show Department of Corrections
307	September 21, 1993	Jamie Lee Curtis	Michael Crawford
Childhood Memories
308	September 22, 1993	Robert De Niro, Chazz Palminteri, Steve Kelley	Rickie Lee Jones with Brian Setzer and Syd Straw
Jaywalking
309	September 23, 1993	Norman Schwarzkopf, Joey Lawrence	Darden Smith
Hairline
310	September 24, 1993	Michael Richards, Kathleen Madigan	PJ Harvey
New Supermarket Products
311	September 27, 1993	Lauren Hutton, Bob Golic	Jade
Jaywalking
312	September 28, 1993	Paul Reiser, Charley Putz-Lamport	Mark Collie
Headlines, The Burning Question
313	September 29, 1993	Michael J. Fox, Kate Jackson	Big Country
Tales of True Romance
314	September 30, 1993	Alec Baldwin, Riddick Bowe	Joshua Kadison
How Your Tonight Show Works

=== October ===
No.	Original release date	Guest(s)	Musical/entertainment guest(s)
315	October 1, 1993	Richard Gere, Valerie Bertinelli	Meat Loaf
Secret footage of baggage handlers
316	October 4, 1993	Pat Sajak, Elle Macpherson	Midnight Oil
Headlines
317	October 5, 1993	Al Michaels, Dennis Wolfberg	Bee Gees
President Clinton cruising
318	October 6, 1993	Kelsey Grammer, Debbie Reynolds	Boyz II Men
Jaywalking
319	October 7, 1993	Jeff Daniels, Fred Stoller, Hulk Hogan	N/A
Fifteen Seconds of Fame
320	October 8, 1993	Jack Lemmon, Jim Varney	Bruce Hornsby
Mid-Season Replacements
321	October 11, 1993	Paul Simon, Andrew Shue	A.J. Croce
Headlines
322	October 12, 1993	Patrick Stewart	Reba McEntire with Linda Davis
Jaywalking
323	October 13, 1993	George Foreman, Danny Aiello	Robert Plant
Strange Dreams
324	October 14, 1993	Emilio Estevez, Susan Powter	Billy Dean
Green Room Hidden Camera
325	October 15, 1993	Rob Schneider, Reggie Jackson	Donna Summer
Jay calls his personal psychic about the World Series
326	October 25, 1993	Anthony Hopkins, Kathy Baker	Trisha Yearwood
Headlines
327	October 26, 1993	Bob Costas, Charles Cozart	Katey Sagal
Halloween Memories
328	October 27, 1993	Sean Young, Blake Clark	Tim Finn
Jaywalking
329	October 28, 1993	Paula Poundstone, Bruce Campbell	Lea Salonga
Collector's Items
330	October 29, 1993	Ann Richards, Chi McBride	James
Finish the Halloween Song Lyrics

=== November ===
No.	Original release date	Guest(s)	Musical/entertainment guest(s)
331	November 1, 1993	Jaleel White, high school football player Cheryl Zimmerman	Lisa Keith
Headlines
332	November 2, 1993	Robert Wagner, John McCririck	Teddy Pendergrass with Patti LaBelle
Jaywalking
333	November 3, 1993	Julia Louis-Dreyfus	Phil Collins
Midnight Confessions
334	November 4, 1993	James Caan, Wayne Knight	Cyndi Lauper
How Your Tonight Show Works
335	November 5, 1993	Mario Cuomo, Bill Braudis	The Lemonheads
Commemorative Plates
336	November 8, 1993	Robert Stack, Brett Butler	Blue Man Group
Headlines
337	November 9, 1993	Roseanne Arnold, Barry Goldwater	John Hiatt
Mysteries of the Packwood Diaries
338	November 10, 1993	Dennis Quaid, Lily Tomlin	Bryan Adams
339	November 11, 1993	Nicole Kidman, Heather DeLoach	Lyle Lovett
Unsolved Mysteries Too Stupid to Be on Unsolved Mysteries
340	November 12, 1993	Rebecca De Mornay, Dennis Regan	dc Talk
This is Your Life: Angie Dickinson, Jimmy Brogan: Frugal Reporter
341	November 15, 1993	Danny Glover, Fran Drescher, Anita Wise	José Carreras
Gary Willner, Ventro-Impressionist
342	November 16, 1993	John Goodman, Terry Bradshaw	Boy George
Headlines
343	November 17, 1993	Jason Alexander, Heather Locklear	Nina Simone
New Male-Oriented Greeting Cards
344	November 18, 1993	Michael Keaton, Jeff Foxworthy, Billy West	N/A
Midnight Confessions
345	November 19, 1993	Andre Agassi	Michael Bolton
346	November 22, 1993	Mark Curry	Mariah Carey
347	November 23, 1993	Robin Williams	Harry Connick Jr.
Jaywalking
348	November 24, 1993	Brett Leake, Laura Dern, Richard Simmons	N/A
349	November 25, 1993	Brian Kiley, Richard Mulligan	Toni Braxton
First Annual Tonight Show Thanksgiving Day Parade
350	November 26, 1993	Troy Aikman, Penelope Ann Miller	Tony Bennett
351	November 29, 1993	Tim Daly	Ricky Van Shelton
352	November 30, 1993	Bobcat Goldthwait, Jane Seymour	Jackson Browne

=== December ===
No.	Original release date	Guest(s)	Musical/entertainment guest(s)
353	December 1, 1993	Tim Daly, Stevie Ray Fromstein	Linda Ronstadt
354	December 2, 1993	Christopher Reeve, Marsha Warfield	The Robert Cray Band
355	December 3, 1993	Whoopi Goldberg, Pierce Brosnan	Céline Dion
Jimmy Brogan reports from Melrose Avenue
356	December 6, 1993	Richard Harris, Wayne Gretzky	Johnny Mathis with David Foster
357	December 7, 1993	Greg Kinnear	Sammy Kershaw
358	December 8, 1993	Martin Scorsese, Rosie Perez	Aaron Neville
359	December 9, 1993	Tom Brokaw, Henry Cho, Anna Marie Goddard	N/A
360	December 10, 1993	Gene Siskel and Roger Ebert, Geechy Guy, Donald Sutherland	N/A
361	December 13, 1993	Chris O'Donnell, Kurt Russell, James DeAngelo, John Ritter	Carnie Wilson, Wendy Wilson
362	December 14, 1993	Henry Winkler, Bob Hope, Mike Myers	N/A
363	December 15, 1993	Holly Hunter, Ilana Kattan	Daryl Hall
364	December 16, 1993	Julia Roberts, Pierce Brosnan, Geechy Guy	N/A
365	December 17, 1993	Howard Stern	Belinda Carlisle
Santa for Adults, Dr. Kevorkian's Holiday Favorites
366	December 20, 1993	Christie Brinkley	Neil Diamond
367	December 21, 1993	Merv Griffin	Belinda Carlisle
368	December 22, 1993	Daniel Baldwin, Marilu Henner, Charles Lowe	N/A
369	December 23, 1993	Conan O'Brien, Sean Morey	Kenny G
370	December 27, 1993	Phil Hartman, Nastassja Kinski	Michael Feinstein
371	December 28, 1993	Charlie Sheen, Chi McBride	Marc Cohn
372	December 29, 1993	Kevin Nealon	John Anderson
373	December 30, 1993	Jack Lemmon, Carl LaBove, Story Musgrave	N/A
1993 Year in Review Jeopardy
374	December 31, 1993	Kevin Meaney	Michael McDonald
Bill Maher reports live from Times Square, Richard Simmons with Barbra Streisand report live from Las Vegas, First Annual Tonight Show New Year's Eve Parade

== 1994 ==
=== January ===
No.	Original release date	Guest(s)	Musical/entertainment guest(s)
375	January 3, 1994	George Hamilton, Larry Miller	Chris Isaak
Headlines
376	January 4, 1994	Kevin Bacon, Bobby Bowden	Brother Phelps
Electronic Tote Boards
377	January 5, 1994	Brian Dennehy, Richard Belzer	Melissa Etheridge
Upcoming Pay-per-view Specials
378	January 6, 1994	Shawn Bradley	Garth Brooks
Jay interviews Charlie Sheen via satellite, hidden camera footage of foreign leaders with American technology
379	January 7, 1994	Sharon Stone, Emma Thompson, Steven Weber	N/A
Live Views from the Hubble Space Telescope, Graceland Comedy Club
380	January 18, 1994	Mark Rydell, Will Smith	Dolly Parton and James Ingram
381	January 19, 1994	Robert Duvall	Kid 'n Play, Mark O'Connor, Pinchas Zukerman
382	January 20, 1994	Thomas Haden Church, Robert Klein	Heart
383	January 21, 1994	Liam Neeson, Ellen Cleghorne, Jimmy Aleck	N/A
New Fitness Products
384	January 24, 1994	Terry Bradshaw, Penelope Ann Miller	Collin Raye
Bill Maher reports live from Washington, DC on State of the Union preparations, Headlines
385	January 25, 1994	Val Kilmer, C.D. LaBove, Stockard Channing	N/A
On the Road with Publishers Clearing House, Football Quiz, Jimmy Brogan reports live from Atlanta on Super Bowl XXVIII preparations
386	January 26, 1994	Buddy Ryan	Liza Minnelli
Bob Costas and Jimmy Brogan report live from Atlanta on Super Bowl XXVIII preparations, Jay, Edd, and Branford play Clue
387	January 27, 1994	Joey Lawrence, Jim McMahon	Babyface
Bob Costas and Jimmy Brogan report live from Atlanta on Super Bowl XXVIII preparations, live footage of Tonya Harding's arrest, New Youth Fitness Standards
388	January 28, 1994	John Larroquette, Kathleen Madigan	Branford Marsalis and The Tonight Show Band
Bob Costas and Jimmy Brogan report live from Atlanta on Super Bowl XXVIII preparations
389	January 31, 1994	Maury Povich	Cowboy Junkies

=== February ===
No.	Original release date	Guest(s)	Musical/entertainment guest(s)
391	February 1, 1994	Brett Butler, Troy Aikman	Tears for Fears
Earthquake Preparedness
392	February 2, 1994	George Carlin, Lena Olin	Toni Braxton
Satellite Dish Repairs
393	February 3, 1994	James Garner, "Barking Dog" basketball player Jason Holt and coach Tim Nolan	Tony Bennett
Jay interviews Tonya Harding and her manager, assumptions vs. reality of studio employees/objects
394	February 4, 1994	Jeff Goldblum, Louie Anderson	Bruce Hornsby
Joke Run
395	February 7, 1994	Kim Basinger, Charles Barkley	Kenny Rogers
Headlines, an audience member swallows a dipstick
396	February 8, 1994	Paul Reiser, Jean Lindamood	Color Me Badd
Midnight Confessions, Suggestions on How Prince Charles Can Improve His Royal Image
397	February 9, 1994	Sinbad, Mark Roberts	Richard Marx
Doomsday Probabilities, Movies Based on True Stories That Weren't Nominated for Oscars
398	February 10, 1994	Jim Carrey, Apple the Knife-Swallowing Dog	Emmylou Harris
Bill Maher reports on Chinese New Year from Chinatown
399	February 11, 1994	Kelsey Grammer, Rachel Hunter, Kathy Ireland, Elle Macpherson	Tori Amos
Joke Run, What is Love?
400	February 14, 1994	Burt Reynolds, Hobson, Montana Mayor Harvey Peterson	Taylor Dayne
Bill Maher reports from Mardi Gras in New Orleans, Headlines
401	February 15, 1994	Tim Allen, Wayne Cotter	Tevin Campbell
402	February 16, 1994	Corbin Bernsen, Leonardo DiCaprio	Village People
403	February 17, 1994	Harvey Fierstein, Steven Seagal	Faith Hill
404	February 18, 1994	Jack Mayberry, Kid 'n Play	Cybill Shepherd
405	February 21, 1994	Charlie Sheen, Jim Morris	Lou Reed
Bill Maher reports from Washington, DC
406	February 22, 1994	Ben Stiller, Mario Joyner	The Band
407	February 23, 1994	Roseanne Arnold, Steven Weber, Bill Irwin and David Shiner	N/A
408	February 24, 1994	Bobcat Goldthwait, Luke Perry	Santana
409	February 25, 1994	Rush Limbaugh, Ann-Margret	Belly
410	February 28, 1994	Bonnie Blair, Phil Hartman	Terence Trent D'Arby

=== March ===
No.	Original release date	Guest(s)	Musical/entertainment guest(s)
411	March 1, 1994	Tom Arnold, Tommy Moe	Gipsy Kings
412	March 2, 1994	Glenn Close, George Foreman	CeCe Peniston
413	March 3, 1994	Angela Bassett, Tom Snyder	Iggy Pop
414	March 4, 1994	Jamie Lee Curtis, Tim Robbins	Tracy Lawrence
415	March 7, 1994	Charles Grodin, Susan Powter	Béla Fleck and the Flecktones
416	March 8, 1994	Paul Hogan, George Wallace, Lindsay Ridgeway	N/A
417	March 9, 1994	Meg Tilly, Rosie Perez	The Impressions
418	March 10, 1994	Geena Davis, Drew Carey	The Juliana Hatfield Three
Joke Run, FBI Dismissal Policies
419	March 11, 1994	Shirley MacLaine, Steven Wright	Martina McBride
Mark Roberts reports from the Bowling Hall of Fame in St. Louis, Jay calls Colin Powell
420	March 14, 1994	John Larroquette, Mort Sahl	Aaron Neville
Headlines
421	March 15, 1994	Terry Bradshaw, Marlon Wayans	John Hiatt
422	March 16, 1994	Richard Simmons, 12-year-old insect expert James Fujita	Jodeci
423	March 17, 1994	Jason Alexander, Bill Braudis, Gaby Hoffmann	N/A
Tonight Show Tavern, Jay calls Burt Reynolds
424	March 18, 1994	Gene Siskel and Roger Ebert, John Mendoza	The Knack
Jaywalking
425	March 21, 1994	Richard Belzer, Todd Hardwick	Marty Stuart and The Staple Singers
Bill Maher reports from the 66th Academy Awards, Headlines
426	March 22, 1994	Jason Priestley, John Caponera	James
427	March 23, 1994	Bill Maher, Vendela Kirsebom	Willie Nelson
428	March 24, 1994	Jean-Claude Van Damme, Kyle MacLachlan	Crowded House
429	March 25, 1994	John Ritter, Dennis Rodman	The Afghan Whigs
What Were They Thinking?

=== April ===
No.	Original release date	Guest(s)	Musical/entertainment guest(s)
430	April 4, 1994	Gilbert Gottfried, Jane Seymour, Montel Williams	N/A
431	April 5, 1994	Fran Drescher, Max Alexander	Barry Manilow
432	April 6, 1994	Michael Keaton	Richard Marx
433	April 7, 1994	Martin Short, Barry Bonds, Ray Romano	N/A
434	April 8, 1994	Katie Couric, Jim Everett	Cocteau Twins
435	April 11, 1994	Shelley Long, Billy Martin, turkey callers	N/A
436	April 12, 1994	Carrie Fisher, John Waters, John Goodman	N/A
437	April 13, 1994	Chevy Chase, Nicollette Sheridan	Patty Loveless
438	April 14, 1994	Kathleen Turner, Ken Olin	The Robert Cray Band
439	April 15, 1994	Arthur P. Bochner, Craig T. Nelson	Björk
440	April 18, 1994	Bill Cosby, 108-year old Sidney Amber	Boz Scaggs
441	April 19, 1994	Henry Kissinger, John Lithgow	Billy Porter
442	April 20, 1994	Marilu Henner, Ralph Macchio	Katey Sagal
443	April 21, 1994	Drew Barrymore, Harry Shearer	Pavement
444	April 22, 1994	Carol Siskind, Louis Gossett Jr., Tom Arnold	N/A
445	April 25, 1994	Jaleel White, Lenny Dykstra	Bruce Cockburn
446	April 26, 1994	Al Franken, Gerry Swallow	B.B. King and Diane Schuur
447	April 27, 1994	Gérard Depardieu, James Wilder, Wendy Liebman	N/A
448	April 28, 1994	Geraldo Rivera, Hugh Grant, escape artist Rick Maisel	N/A
449	April 29, 1994	Ellen DeGeneres	Cheap Trick

=== May ===
No.	Original release date	Guest(s)	Musical/entertainment guest(s)
450	May 2, 1994	Andie MacDowell, Suzanne Somers	John Michael Montgomery
451	May 3, 1994	Dana Carvey, Robert Reich	N/A
Tonight Show Audience Dating Service
452	May 4, 1994	Patrick Duffy, Anthony Clark	Celine Dion
Jay writes a letter to his Bulgarian pen pal
453	May 5, 1994	John Wing Jr., David McKelvey	Will Smith
454	May 6, 1994	Bobcat Goldthwait, Lauren Hutton	Clint Black
455	May 9, 1994	Jay Thomas, Laura San Giacomo	Cirque du Soleil
Headlines, Hollywood Entertainment Museum Preview
456	May 10, 1994	Michael Richards, Alan Alda, national whistling champions Chris Ullman and Suzanne Stafford	N/A
Jaywatch
457	May 11, 1994	George Carlin, Jack Palance, Fred Roggin	N/A
Midnight Confessions
458	May 12, 1994	Don Johnson, Pat Hazell	Huey Lewis and the News
Beachwear Fashion Show
459	May 13, 1994	Richard Dean Anderson	Tony! Toni! Toné!
460	May 16, 1994	Mike Myers, Spike Lee	James Taylor
From New York City: Jack Paar makes a walk-on appearance, Kathie Lee Gifford narrates Jay and Branford's tour of the city
461	May 17, 1994	Cindy Crawford, Bill Maher	Julio Iglesias
From New York City: Joke Run
462	May 18, 1994	Michael J. Fox, Bill Cosby	N/A
From New York City, Madonna makes a walk-on appearance
463	May 19, 1994	Farrah Fawcett	Kathie Lee Gifford
From New York City
464	May 20, 1994	Howard Stern, Paulina Porizkova	Blue Man Group
From New York City
465	May 23, 1994	Craig Kargas, Eddie Murphy	Jon Secada
466	May 24, 1994	Brett Butler, Carl Reiner	The Allman Brothers Band
467	May 25, 1994	A.J. Jamal, Ted Danson, Blake Clark	N/A
468	May 26, 1994	Helen Hunt, Tommy Lasorda, Richard Carter	N/A
469	May 27, 1994	Cody Shilts, Shelley Long	Gin Blossoms
470	May 30, 1994	Jeff Rothpan, Zelda Harris	N/A
471	May 31, 1994	Dennis Hopper, Penny Marshall	Crosby, Stills & Nash

=== June ===
No.	Original release date	Guest(s)	Musical/entertainment guest(s)
533	June 1, 1994	Charlie Cozart, Paula Zahn	Rodney Crowell
534	June 2, 1994	Danny DeVito, Ray Romano	All-4-One
535	June 3, 1994	Dennis Rodman, Tom Arnold	N/A
536	June 6, 1994	Kevin Nealon	David Cassidy
537	June 7, 1994	Michael Kearney, Kyle MacLachlan	N/A
538	June 8, 1994	Kathleen Madigan, Leila Kenzle	David Hasselhoff
539	June 9, 1994	Billy Crystal, David Robinson	Texas
540	June 10, 1994	Alexi Lalas, Matthew Broderick	Sheryl Crow
541	June 13, 1994	Charlton Heston, Ellen Cleghorne	Clay Walker
542	June 14, 1994	Patrick Stewart, Wayne Federman	Traffic
543	June 15, 1994	Daniel Stern, Henry Cho, Ned G. Andrews	N/A
544	June 16, 1994	Ali Wentworth, Kadeem Hardison	Michael Bolton
545	June 17, 1994	Alec Baldwin, Vinny Paz	Dale Turner
546	June 20, 1994	Mark Harmon	Henry Rollins
547	June 21, 1994	Sheila Phillips	Crash Test Dummies
548	June 22, 1994	Jimmy Johnson, Molly Ringwald	Iris DeMent
549	June 23, 1994	Chuck Martin, Whoopi Goldberg, Vicki Van Meter	N/A
550	June 24, 1994	Kirk Douglas	Oingo Boingo

=== July ===
No.	Original release date	Guest(s)	Musical/entertainment guest(s)
551	July 4, 1994	David Spade	Bonnie Raitt
552	July 5, 1994	Marv Albert, Paula Poundstone	Neal McCoy
553	July 6, 1994	Bernardo Bertolucci, Cybill Shepherd, Larry Miller	N/A
554	July 7, 1994	Nathan Lane, Penelope Ann Miller	Neville Brothers
555	July 8, 1994	Henrik Larsson, Jack Mayberry, Jeff Bridges, Jan Van Houselt, Martin Dahlin, Tim Van Houselt, Tomas Brolin, Tony Meola	N/A
556	July 11, 1994	Ed McMahon, Julie Walters	Sounds of Blackness
557	July 12, 1994	Franklyn Ajaye, Hulk Hogan, Jamie Lee Curtis	N/A
558	July 13, 1994	Bob Smith, Wendy Wasserstein	Garth Brooks
559	July 14, 1994	Arnold Schwarzenegger, Chi McBride, Fred Stachnik	N/A
560	July 15, 1994	Jennifer Connelly, Suzy Amis Cameron, Tony Danza	Billy Corgan, Tony Bennett, Ludacris
561	July 18, 1994	Patti LaBelle, Tom Arnold, Tom Guiry	N/A
562	July 19, 1994	Bill Braudis, John McLaughlin, Sandra Bullock	N/A
563	July 20, 1994	Danny Glover	Terence Blanchard
564	July 21, 1994	Arthur P. Bochner, Tom Hanks	The Smithereens
565	July 22, 1994	Ali Wentworth, Jack Coen, Keanu Reeves	N/A
566	July 25, 1994	Alan Lubell, Andy Garcia, Magic Johnson	Cachao
567	July 26, 1994	Bill Maher, Justin Elliot	Billy West
568	July 27, 1994	Bug Hall	William Shatner
569	July 28, 1994	Jerry Giles, Richard Jeni, Shelley Winters	Basia
570	July 29, 1994	Richard Simmons, Rolonda Watts	Kenny Loggins

=== August ===
No.	Original release date	Guest(s)	Musical/entertainment guest(s)
571	August 1, 1994	Mark Pitta, Sean Young	Marie Osmond
572	August 2, 1994	Don Rickles	Roger Daltrey
573	August 3, 1994	Ellen Cleghorne, Harrison Ford	Travis Tritt
574	August 4, 1994	Jim Carrey	Harry Connick Jr.
575	August 5, 1994	Michael Moore, Paulina Porizkova	David Hasselhoff
576	August 8, 1994	Graham Thomas Chipperfield, Harvey Korman, Terence Stamp	N/A
577	August 9, 1994	Whoopi Goldberg, Michael Kinsley	N/A
578	August 10, 1994	Jeff Foxworthy	Cyndi Lauper, Judge Reinhold, Micky Dolenz
579	August 11, 1994	Nicolas Cage	Phil Collins
580	August 12, 1994	Pauly Shore, Tommy Lasorda	Leon Redbone
581	August 15, 1994	Geraldo Rivera	Joe Williams
582	August 16, 1994	Linda Gray, George Wallace, Reggie Miller	N/A
583	August 17, 1994	Tim Conway, Ray Liotta	Tori Amos
584	August 22, 1994	Bo Jackson	Sandra Bernhard
585	August 23, 1994	Paul Reiser	Stevie Nicks
586	August 24, 1994	Richard Benjamin, Bridget Fonda	Aaron Hall
587	August 25, 1994	Susan Norfleet, Robert Downey Jr.	N/A
588	August 26, 1994	Cameron Diaz, Richard Lewis	N/A

=== September ===
No.	Original release date	Guest(s)	Musical/entertainment guest(s)
589	September 5, 1994	Terry Bradshaw, Amanda Plummer, Steve Starr	N/A
590	September 6, 1994	Jason Priestley, Julie Brown	Randy Travis
591	September 7, 1994	David Alan Grier, Melanie Griffith	Sarah McLachlan
592	September 8, 1994	Heather Locklear, Richard Dawson	Joe Cocker
593	September 9, 1994	Bill Maher, Susan Lucci	N/A
594	September 12, 1994	Dabney Coleman, Marc Summers	Kenneth Edmonds
595	September 13, 1994	John Larroquette, Suzanne Somers	Ms. Dynamite
596	September 14, 1994	John Henton	Dick Van Dyke
597	September 15, 1994	Thomas Haden Church, Will Smith	Chris Bliss
598	September 16, 1994	George Clooney, Rob Morrow	Trisha Yearwood
599	September 19, 1994	(FROM LAS VEGAS) Martin Short, Kimberly Clarice Aiken	Luther Vandross
600	September 20, 1994	(FROM LAS VEGAS) Brett Butler	Vince Gill
601	September 21, 1994	(FROM LAS VEGAS) Courteney Cox, Roseanne Barr	Eydie Gormé, Steve Lawrence
602	September 22, 1994	(FROM LAS VEGAS) Charlie Sheen, George Wallace	Wayne Newton
603	September 23, 1994	(FROM LAS VEGAS) Jean-Claude Van Damme, Howie Mandel	N/A
604	September 26, 1994	Howard Stern, Paulina Porizkova	Blue Man Group
605	September 27, 1994	Jon Evans, Phil Hartman	Steve Allen
606	September 28, 1994	Harvey Fierstein, Marilu Henner	Boz Scaggs
607	September 29, 1994	Jason Alexander, Wayne Gretzky	Shanice
608	September 30, 1994	Alexandra Wentworth, Kevin Bacon, Matt Lauer	N/A

=== October ===
No.	Original release date	Guest(s)	Musical/entertainment guest(s)
609	October 3, 1994	Charles Grodin, Jane Leeves	Robbie Robertson
610	October 4, 1994	Jerry Rice, Marlee Matlin	The Temptations
611	October 5, 1994	Brett Leake, James Carville, Jay Thomas, Mary Matalin	N/A
612	October 6, 1994	Dan Quayle, Gerry Swallow, Melissa Gilbert	N/A
613	October 7, 1994	Alan King, Claudia Shear, Mark Beeson	N/A
614	October 10, 1994	Pamela Anderson, Richard Dean Anderson	Jimmy Buffett
615	October 11, 1994	Arnold Palmer, Sarah Jessica Parker	Anita Baker
616	October 12, 1994	David Hyde Pierce, Paula Poundstone	Mark Chesnutt
617	October 13, 1994	Jane Pauley, John Ritter	Robert Palmer
618	October 14, 1994	Uma Thurman, Walter Cronkite	Stomp
619	October 17, 1994	Burt Reynolds, Marc Summers, Scott Thompson	N/A
620	October 18, 1994	Scott Thompson, Warren Beatty	Chet Atkins, Suzy Bogguss
621	October 19, 1994	Judith Light, Richard Belzer, Tim Robbins	N/A
622	October 20, 1994	Annette Bening, Gene Siskel, Roger Ebert	Waylon Jennings
623	October 21, 1994	Quentin Tarantino	Carol Burnett
624	October 31, 1994	Bill Maher, Jennifer Tilly, Matthew Broderick, Tiny Tim	Big Star

=== November ===
No.	Original release date	Guest(s)	Musical/entertainment guest(s)
625	November 1, 1994	Ellen Cleghorne, Kenneth Branagh, Junior Seau	N/A
626	November 2, 1994	George Carlin, Samuel L. Jackson	N/A
627	November 3, 1994	Henry Shearer, Julia Louis-Dreyfus	Lyle Lovett
628	November 4, 1994	Shannen Doherty, Steven Wright	Clint Black
629	November 7, 1994	John McLaughlin, Tim Allen	Amy Grant, Vince Gill
630	November 8, 1994	Brett Leake, Fran Drescher, Philip Casnoff	N/A
631	November 9, 1994	John Larroquette, Kurt Russell	N/A
632	November 10, 1994	Anthony Edwards, Jonathan Winters	Mary Chapin Carpenter
633	November 11, 1994	Bo Derek, Whoopi Goldberg	Al Green
634	November 14, 1994	Alex Trebek, Brett Butler, Morgan Fairchild	The Pretenders
635	November 15, 1994	Deion Sanders, Ellen DeGeneres	Reba McEntire
636	November 16, 1994	Bill Bellamy, James Garner	N/A
637	November 17, 1994	Patrick Stewart, Vendela Kirsebom	Sonny Bono
638	November 18, 1994	Barbara Bush, Cybill Shepherd	N/A
639	November 21, 1994	(FROM NEW YORK CITY) Bill Cosby, Richard Dean Anderson	Celine Dion
640	November 22, 1994	(FROM NEW YORK CITY) Katie Couric, Rosie Perez	Barry Manilow
641	November 23, 1994	(FROM NEW YORK CITY) David Hasselhoff, Elle Macpherson	Bon Jovi
642	November 24, 1994	(FROM NEW YORK CITY) George Clooney, George Wallace	David Copperfield
643	November 25, 1994	(FROM NEW YORK CITY) Brooke Shields	N/A
644	November 28, 1994	David Hyde Pierce	Dolly Parton
645	November 29, 1994	Gerry Swallow, Merv Griffin	William Shatner
646	November 30, 1994	Ralph Louis Harris, Rosalynn Carter	Kenny G

=== December ===
No.	Original release date	Guest(s)	Musical/entertainment guest(s)
647	December 1, 1994	George Foreman	Natalie Cole
648	December 2, 1994	Keenen Ivory Wayans	Neil Diamond
649	December 12, 1994	Mara Wilson, Lily Tomlin	Seal
650	December 13, 1994	Liam Neeson	Tom Jones
651	December 14, 1994	Jennifer Aniston, Michael Keaton	Des'ree
652	December 15, 1994	Julie Andrews, Louie Anderson	Bonnie Raitt
653	December 16, 1994	Dennis Franz, Denny Garver, Edward Clinton	Julie Brown
654	December 19, 1994	Paul Reiser	Garth Brooks
655	December 20, 1994	A.J. Jamal, Melissa Etheridge	Juliette Lewis
656	December 21, 1994	Al Gliniecki, Chi McBride, Susan Sarandon	N/A
657	December 22, 1994	Eric Lloyd	Mel Tormé
658	December 23, 1994	Frédérique Le Calvez, Jim Carrey	N/A
659	December 26, 1994	Judge Reinhold	N/A
660	December 27, 1994	Bill Maher, Lauren Bacall	Hootie & the Blowfish
661	December 28, 1994	Courtney Thorne-Smith, Jeff Daniels	Brandy Norwood
662	December 29, 1994	Jake Johannsen, Jean-Claude Van Damme, Noah Wyle	N/A
663	December 30, 1994	Forest Whitaker, Terry Bradshaw	Al Green

== 1995 ==
=== January ===
No.	Original release date	Guest(s)	Musical/entertainment guest(s)
3.231	January 2, 1995	Corbin Bernsen, Karen Duffy	Luciano Pavarotti
3.232	January 3, 1995	Joe Theismann, Kim Coles, Martin Landau	N/A
3.233	January 4, 1995	Brooke Shields, Henry Rollins	Boyz II Men
3.234	January 5, 1995	James DeAngelo, Quentin Tarantino, Suzanne Somers, Wayne Federman	Davy Jones
3.235	January 6, 1995	David Robinson, Willem Dafoe	Jon Secada
3.236	January 9, 1995	Barry White, Howie Long, Sinbad	N/A
3.237	January 10, 1995	Faye Dunaway, Marlon Wayans	Tony Bennett
3.238	January 11, 1995	Marilu Henner, Luke Tarsitano, Tim Russert	N/A
3.239	January 12, 1995	Richard Simmons	Patty Smyth
3.240	January 13, 1995	Charles Barkley, Phoenix Sun, Talia Seider	Alan Jackson
3.241	January 16, 1995	Charles Grodin, Lauren Holly	Pam Tillis
3.242	January 17, 1995	Ivan Lendl, Dee Dee Myers, John Travolta	N/A
3.243	January 18, 1995	Samuel L. Jackson, Wayne Gretzky	Nanci Griffith
3.244	January 19, 1995	Christian Slater, Janine Turner, Natrone Means	N/A
3.245	January 20, 1995	Kevin Bacon, Sophia Loren	Cirque du Soleil
3.246	January 23, 1995	Geraldo Rivera, Sigourney Weaver	Liz Phair
3.247	January 24, 1995	Troy Aikman, John Ritter	Etta James
3.248	January 25, 1995	Jennifer Aniston, Melanie Griffith, Anthony Griffith	N/A
3.249	January 26, 1995	Daniel Baldwin, Sharon Stone	The Go-Go's
3.250	January 27, 1995	Chazz Palminteri, Raquel Welch	Billy Martin
3.251	January 30, 1995	Jonathan Winters, Ricky Watters, Sydney Ambe	N/A
3.252	January 31, 1995	Aidan Quinn, Al Lubel, Fran Lebowitz	N/A

=== February ===
No.	Original release date	Guest(s)	Musical/entertainment guest(s)
3.253	February 1, 1995	George Seifert, Suzanne Somers	Dionne Farris
3.254	February 2, 1995	John Pankow, Robert Factor, Whoopi Goldberg	Travis Tritt
3.255	February 3, 1995	Alexandra Wentworth, Oprah Winfrey	Joni Mitchell
3.256	February 6, 1995	Brett Butler, Lindsay Regala	Vince Gill
3.257	February 7, 1995	Charlotte Leibel, Tom Arnold	N/A
3.258	February 8, 1995	David Hyde Pierce, Jimmy Carter, Nito Larioza	N/A
3.259	February 9, 1995	Cheryl Tiegs, Will Smith	Harry Connick, Jr.
3.260	February 10, 1995	Kareem Abdul-Jabbar, Don Rickles	Tom Jones
3.261	February 13, 1995	Alexandra Wentworth, Barry Goldwater, Shelley Long	N/A
3.262	February 14, 1995	Bucky and Vinnie, Phil Hartman	Take 6
3.263	February 15, 1995	Bob Costas, Daniela Peštová, Wayne Cotter	N/A
3.264	February 16, 1995	Jeffrey Tambor, Sally Field	Mary J. Blige
3.265	February 17, 1995	Bob Uecker, Mara Wilson	Joe Cocker
3.266	February 20, 1995	Kelsey Grammer, Patsy Kensit	The Moody Blues
3.267	February 21, 1995	David Hasselhoff, Margaret White	N/A
3.268	February 22, 1995	Uma Thurman, Victoria Jackson	Laurie Anderson
3.269	February 23, 1995	Magic Johnson	Willie Nelson
3.270	February 24, 1995	Harry Hamlin, Mike Myers	Tori Amos
3.271	February 27, 1995	Jennifer Tilly, Ted Danson	N/A
3.272	February 28, 1995	Roseanne Barr	All-4-One

=== March ===
No.	Original release date	Guest(s)	Musical/entertainment guest(s)
3.273	March 1, 1995	Don Johnson	Frankie Valli
3.274	March 2, 1995	Haley Joel Osment, Will Smith	Carly Simon
3.275	March 3, 1995	Kathy Ireland, Henry Rollins	Simple Minds
3.276	March 6, 1995	Alan Thicke, Gina Lollobrigida	Cirque du Soleil
3.277	March 7, 1995	John Goodman, Tori Spelling	The Mavericks
3.278	March 8, 1995	Dustin Hoffman	Martin Page
3.279	March 9, 1995	Jeff Fahey, Paul Reiser	N/A
3.280	March 10, 1995	Jeff Goldblum, Lauren Hutton	John Mayall, Vicki Randle
3.281	March 13, 1995	Jeff Cesario, George Wendt	Victoria Williams
3.282	March 14, 1995	N/A	N/A
3.283	March 15, 1995	Rene Russo	Anita Baker
3.284	March 16, 1995	Chevy Chase	Patti LaBelle
3.285	March 17, 1995	Sinbad, William Shatner	Toni Collette
3.286	March 20, 1995	Phil Hartman, Ice-T, Bradley Joseph	Sheena Easton
3.287	March 21, 1995	Clinton Elmore, Marc John Jefferies, Marilu Henner, Shelley Winters	Indigo Girls
3.288	March 22, 1995	Clinton Elmore, Patty Duke	N/A
3.289	March 23, 1995	Bo Derek, Damon Wayans	Donna Summer
3.290	March 24, 1995	Gene Siskel, Roger Ebert	Toni Collette

=== April ===
No.	Original release date	Guest(s)	Musical/entertainment guest(s)
3.291	April 3, 1995	Chris Farley, David Spade, Judith Light	Randy Travis
3.292	April 4, 1995	Brett Butler, Martin Landau	Jimmy Cliff, Lebo M
3.293	April 5, 1995	Brooke Shields, George Wallace, Omar Sharif	N/A
3.294	April 6, 1995	Jack Coen, Rob Lowe	Carlos Santana, John Lee Hooker Jr.
3.295	April 7, 1995	Orlando Brown	Nancy Sinatra
3.296	April 10, 1995	Hank Aaron, Mark Harmon, Margaret Cho	N/A
3.297	April 11, 1995	Bob Saget, Matthew Perry	N/A
3.298	April 12, 1995	Dan Hirschman, Fran Drescher, Leslie Nielsen	N/A
3.299	April 13, 1995	David Hasselhoff, George Wallace, Johnny Depp	The Notorious B.I.G.
3.1300	April 14, 1995	Martin Lawrence, Lisa Rinna	Salt-N-Pepa
3.300	April 18, 1995	Carol Kane, Dennis Franz, Matt Haton	N/A
3.301	April 19, 1995	Kevin Spacey, Minnie Driver	Mel Tormé
3.1302	April 20, 1995	Jack Jason, Marlee Matlin, Richard Simmons	Adam Ant
Yakety Yak
3.302	April 21, 1995	Al Franken, Kirstie Alley	Clint Black
3.303	April 24, 1995	Gordon Elliott, Olivia d'Abo, Tim Conway	N/A
3.304	April 25, 1995	Bill Pullman, Charles Barkley	Lari White
3.305	April 26, 1995	Jack Palance, Rachel Hunter, Tom Agna	N/A
3.1306	April 27, 1995	Anthony Edwards, Robin Quivers	Linda Ronstadt
3.306	April 28, 1995	Curtis Williams, Melanie Griffith	Stevie Wonder

=== May ===
No.	Original release date	Guest(s)	Musical/entertainment guest(s)
3.307	May 1, 1995	Ali Wentworth, Larry King, Oscar De La Hoya	N/A
3.308	May 2, 1995	Quentin Tarantino, Tori Spelling	Naomi Judd
3.309	May 3, 1995	Sandra Bernhard, Shirley MacLaine	Reba McEntire
3.310	May 4, 1995	George Atkins, Veronica Webb	N/A
3.311	May 5, 1995	Cybill Shepherd, Kadeem Hardison	George Thorogood
3.312	May 8, 1995	Jesse Jackson, Luke Tarsitano	Gipsy Kings
3.313	May 9, 1995	Jeff Foxworthy	Trisha Yearwood
3.314	May 10, 1995	Dennis Miller, Vlade Divac	Teri Hatcher
3.1315	May 11, 1995	Samuel L. Jackson, Vendela Kirsebom	Garth Brooks
Stayin' Awake
3.315	May 12, 1995	Traci Lords	Gary Wright, Stephen Stills
3.316	May 15, 1995	Bill Maher, Kathy Ireland	PJ Harvey
3.317	May 16, 1995	Plácido Domingo	Johnny Winter
3.318	May 17, 1995	Gene Hackman, John Ritter	Robert Cray
3.319	May 18, 1995	Billy Crystal, George Foreman	John Pizzarelli
3.320	May 19, 1995	Denzel Washington	Martin Short
3.321	May 22, 1995	Courtney Thorne-Smith, Don Rickles	Aaron Neville
3.1322	May 23, 1995	Elle Macpherson, Magic Johnson	N/A
If OJ Were a Poor Man
3.322	May 24, 1995	David Meek	Jerry Lee Lewis
3.323	May 25, 1995	Mel Gibson, Scott Thompson	Vince Gill
3.324	May 26, 1995	David Duchovny, James Woods	Jill Soble
3.325	May 29, 1995	Corbin Bernsen, Jason Kidd, Mark Roberts	N/A
3.326	May 30, 1995	George Hamilton	The Highwaymen
3.327	May 31, 1995	William Shatner	Peter Cetera

=== June ===
No.	Original release date	Guest(s)	Musical/entertainment guest(s)
3.328	June 1, 1995	Bill Pullman, Dina Meyer, Tom Agna	N/A
3.329	June 2, 1995	Cindy Crawford, Nancy Travis	Lyle Lovett
3.330	June 5, 1995	Bill Pullman	Joely Fisher
3.331	June 6, 1995	Kevin Nealon	Liza Minnelli
3.332	June 7, 1995	Peter Jacobsen, Jennifer Aniston	Anita Baker, James Ingram
3.333	June 8, 1995	Eric Idle, Mike Piazza	Brownstone (group)
3.334	June 9, 1995	Reggie Miller, Sandra Taylor, Val Kilmer	N/A
3.335	June 12, 1995	Geraldo Rivera, Michael Colangelo	Matthew Sweet
3.336	June 13, 1995	Courteney Cox, Jim Fowler, Louie Anderson	N/A
3.337	June 14, 1995	Gail O'Grady, Rodney Dangerfield	Collective Soul
3.338	June 15, 1995	Frédérique Le Calvez	Celine Dion
3.339	June 16, 1995	Christian Slater, Janine Turner, Natrone Means	N/A
3.340	June 19, 1995	Alexandra Paul, Jack Gallagher, Sean Connery	N/A
3.341	June 20, 1995	Clyde Drexler, Lisa Kudrow, Sylvester Stallone	Jon B., Kenneth Edmonds
3.342	June 21, 1995	Jimmy Carter, Terry Bradshaw	N/A
3.343	June 22, 1995	Amanda De Cadenet, Kevin Bacon	All-4-One
3.344	June 23, 1995	Ellen Cleghorne	Annie Lennox
3.345	June 26, 1995	Richard Jeni	John Goodman
3.346	June 27, 1995	Jack Gallagher, Victoria Principal	David Duchovny
3.347	June 28, 1995	Bill Bellamy, Carole Bouquet, Mary Hart	N/A
3.348	June 29, 1995	Carl Reiner, Richard Lewis	The Allman Brothers Band
3.1349	June 30, 1995	Kevin Pollak, Luke Tarsitano	Des'ree
OJ Half Time Show

=== July ===
No.	Original release date	Guest(s)	Musical/entertainment guest(s)
3.349	July 10, 1995	Hugh Grant, Jill Hennessy	The Doobie Brothers
3.350	July 11, 1995	Marian Kelly, Steven Seagal	Seal
3.351	July 12, 1995	Roseanne Barr, Natasha Henstridge	Shania Twain
3.352	July 13, 1995	Howie Mandel	Chris Isaak
3.353	July 14, 1995	Dennis Hopper, Paula Poundstone	N/A
3.354	July 17, 1995	Curtis Williams, Deborah Norville, Louie Anderson	N/A
3.355	July 18, 1995	Garry Shandling, Yasmine Bleeth	John Michael Montgomery
3.362	July 19, 1995	Bill Braudis, Chris O'Donnell, Irene Bedard	The Rembrandts
3.363	July 20, 1995	Carl LaBove, Janeane Garofalo, Mia Cottet	N/A
3.364	July 21, 1995	Patrick Swayze, Stephanie Miller	Hootie & the Blowfish
3.365	July 24, 1995	Doug E. Doug, Richard Simmons	Alison Krauss
3.366	July 25, 1995	Dennis Miller	Curtis Stigers
3.367	July 26, 1995	Danny Glover, Parker Posey	Björk
3.368	July 27, 1995	Arantxa Sánchez Vicario, Matt LeBlanc	N/A
3.369	July 28, 1995	Dean Cain, Tom Selleck	Jody Watley
3.370	July 31, 1995	Andre Agassi, Gerry Swallow, Irene Bedard	N/A

=== August ===
No.	Original release date	Guest(s)	Musical/entertainment guest(s)
3.371	August 1, 1995	Daniel Stern, Katherine Heigl, Orlando Ashley	John Tesh
3.372	August 2, 1995	Kelly Lynch, Ken Bannister	Brooks & Dunn
3.373	August 3, 1995	Jeffrey Tambor, Sandra Bullock	Diana King
3.374	August 4, 1995	Alicia Silverstone, Brody Buster, Jay Thomas	N/A
3.375	August 7, 1995	Cathy St. George, Joan Embery, Peter McNeeley, Tina Majorino	N/A
3.376	August 8, 1995	Bill Maher, Linda Evangelista	N/A
3.377	August 9, 1995	Judy Gold, Kathy Ireland, Keanu Reeves	N/A
3.378	August 10, 1995	Noah Wyle	Sophie B. Hawkins
3.379	August 11, 1995	Brian Williams, Jimmy Smits	George Jones, Tammy Wynette
3.380	August 14, 1995	Andrew Lawrence, David Spade	Dave Matthews Band
3.381	August 15, 1995	Bob Newhart	Michael Bolton
3.382	August 16, 1995	Dee Dee Myers, Dennis Regan, Kevin Costner	N/A
3.383	August 17, 1995	Christopher Lambert, John Lizzi, Sinbad	Terence Trent D'Arby
Sugartime
3.1384	August 18, 1995	Antonio Banderas, Evan Davis	Cyndi Lauper
3.384	August 28, 1995	Edward Burns, Ellen DeGeneres, Kevin Sorbo	N/A
3.385	August 29, 1995	Don Rickles, Kyra Sedgwick	Heart
3.386	August 30, 1995	Matthew Perry, Sandra Taylor	John Prine
3.387	August 31, 1995	Dan Finnerty, Parvin Farhoody, Scott Thompson	Dolly Parton

=== September ===
No.	Original release date	Guest(s)	Musical/entertainment guest(s)
4.1	September 4, 1995	David Alan Grier, Gary Sinise, Bridgette Wilson	N/A
4.2	September 5, 1995	Angela Lansbury, Ellen Cleghorne	Joan Osborne
4.3	September 6, 1995	Melissa Gilbert, Luke Tarsitano	Dr. John
4.4	September 7, 1995	Heather Locklear, Matt Frewer	Ty England
4.5	September 8, 1995	Chris Bliss, Gabriel Byrne, Julian Sanchez	N/A
4.8	September 11, 1995	Drew Carey, Dale Earnhardt, Cybill Shepherd	N/A
4.9	September 12, 1995	Brett Butler, Jeremy Piven, Jim Lehrer	N/A
4.10	September 13, 1995	James Woods, Lea Thompson	Little Feat
4.11	September 14, 1995	Bridget Hall, Dan Finnerty, David Hyde Pierce, Tony James	Aaron Neville
4.13	September 15, 1995	Courtney Thorne-Smith, Martin Lawrence	Stomp
4.14	September 18, 1995	Eric Karros, Phil Hartman, Shawntel Smith	N/A
4.15	September 19, 1995	George Clooney, Gena Lee Nolin, Harry Shearer	N/A
4.16	September 20, 1995	Jeff Greenfield, Jerry Seinfeld	Vince Gill
4.17	September 21, 1995	David Hasselhoff	Michael Bolton
4.18	September 22, 1995	Paul Reiser	Paula Abdul
4.10191	September 25, 1995	Jenny McCarthy, Tim Allen	Jerry Miller
Scenes from the O.J. Trial
4.10192	September 26, 1995	Colin Powell	Mary Chapin Carpenter
OJ: The Early Years
4.10193	September 27, 1995	Jonathan Silverman, Tori Spelling	Diana Ross
Scenes from the O.J. Trial: Part 2
4.19	September 28, 1995	Denzel Washington, Elizabeth Berkley	Bon Jovi
4.20	September 29, 1995	Dave Foley, Martin Short	Bruce Hornsby

=== October ===
No.	Original release date	Guest(s)	Musical/entertainment guest(s)
4.21	October 2, 1995	Harry Wu	Bette Midler
4.22	October 3, 1995	Joey Lawrence, The Wilsons	N/A
Lawyers
4.23	October 4, 1995	Frank Thomas, Marissa Patterson, Regis Philbin	N/A
4.24	October 5, 1995	Angie Everhart, Eriq La Salle	Randy Newman
4.25	October 6, 1995	David Caruso, Steve Guttenberg	Robert Cray
4.26	October 9, 1995	Mark Curry, Jamie Lee Curtis	Tim McGraw
4.27	October 10, 1995	Paula Poundstone, Robert Duvall	Chris Isaak
4.1028	October 11, 1995	Dana Carvey, Haley Joel Osment, Michael Pasternak	Tears for Fears
The Night OJ Was to Be Interviewed on NBC
4.28	October 12, 1995	John Travolta, Parker Posey	Jimmy Buffett
4.29	October 13, 1995	Conan O'Brien, Mark Schiff	Boy George
4.30	October 23, 1995	Rita Wilson, Patrick Swayze	Simply Red
4.31	October 24, 1995	Dean Cain, Dom Irrera, Joe Theismann	N/A
4.32	October 25, 1995	Lori Loughlin, Riddick Bowe, Rodney Dangerfield	N/A
4.33	October 26, 1995	Julianna Margulies	k.d. lang
4.34	October 27, 1995	Kadeem Hardison, Tiffani Thiessen	David Bowie
4.35	October 30, 1995	Debbie Allen, Roseanne Barr	N/A
4.37	October 31, 1995	Dennis Franz, Ivana Trump	N/A

=== November ===
No.	Original release date	Guest(s)	Musical/entertainment guest(s)
4.38	November 1, 1995	Alec Baldwin, Brooke Shields	Dwight Yoakam
4.39	November 2, 1995	Pamela Anderson, Rob Reiner	Björk
4.40	November 3, 1995	Will Smith	Tony Bennett
4.41	November 6, 1995	Dennis Miller, Seth Mumy (bumped), Téa Leoni, Harvey Korman, Tim Conway	N/A
4.42	November 7, 1995	Billy Crystal, Mira Sorvino (scheduled)	Alan Jackson
4.43	November 8, 1995	Julia Louis-Dreyfus, Marissa Patterson	Jon Secada
4.44	November 9, 1995	Jim Carrey	Tom Jones
4.45	November 10, 1995	Mira Sorvino, Pierce Brosnan, Steven Wright	N/A
4.46	November 13, 1995	(FROM LAS VEGAS) Robin Williams	David Lee Roth
4.47	November 14, 1995	(FROM LAS VEGAS) Famke Janssen, Mel Gibson	Penn Jillette
4.48	November 15, 1995	(FROM LAS VEGAS) Magic Johnson	Eydie Gormé, Steve Lawrence
4.49	November 16, 1995	(FROM LAS VEGAS) Michael Douglas, Scott O'Grady	Al Green
4.50	November 17, 1995	(FROM LAS VEGAS) Ali Wentworth, Rodney Dangerfield	Paula Abdul
4.51	November 20, 1995	Kathy Ireland, Johnny Depp	Garth Brooks
4.52	November 21, 1995	Amiri Baraka, Sharon Stone	Harry Connick Jr.
4.53	November 22, 1995	Cynthia Stevenson, Richard Simmons	Blues Traveler
4.54	November 23, 1995	Anna-Marie Goddard, Kevin Nealon	Vanessa-Mae
4.55	November 24, 1995	Markie Post	Natalie Merchant
4.10561	November 27, 1995	Tony Danza	Bruce Springsteen, Rot
4.10562	November 28, 1995	Gena Lee Nolin, Jeff Foxworthy	Clint Black
4.10563	November 29, 1995	Jason Alexander, Kelsey Grammer	N/A

=== December ===
No.	Original release date	Guest(s)	Musical/entertainment guest(s)
4.56	December 1, 1995	Gene Siskel, Howard Stern, Janine Lindemulder, Nikki Tyler, Roger Ebert	N/A
4.57	December 4, 1995	Andie MacDowell, Cal Ripken Jr.	Reba McEntire
4.58	December 5, 1995	Emma Thompson, John Waters	Patti LaBelle
4.59	December 6, 1995	Greg Kinnear, James Paul Roeske II, Rondell Sheridan	N/A
4.60	December 7, 1995	Jon Cryer, Martin Short	k.d. lang, Lyle Lovett, Randy Newman
4.61	December 8, 1995	Eric Esch, Teri Hatcher	Lenny Kravitz
4.62	December 11, 1995	Kevin Bacon	John Hiatt
4.63	December 12, 1995	Jennifer Beals, Sinbad	Jino Mitchell
4.64	December 13, 1995	Don Rickles	Meat Loaf, Rot the Terrible Band
4.65	December 14, 1995	Lea Thompson	Luther Vandross
4.66	December 15, 1995	Mike Myers, Blake Clark	N/A
4.67	December 18, 1995	David Alan Grier, John Larroquette	Mannheim Steamroller
4.68	December 19, 1995	Brian Williams, Luke Tarsitano	N/A
4.69	December 20, 1995	Art Donovan, Jake Johannsen	N/A
4.70	December 21, 1995	Ellen Cleghorne, Matthew Modine	Mel Tormé
4.71	December 22, 1995	Ashley Judd, Terry Bradshaw	N/A
4.72	December 25, 1995	Frédérique Le Calvez	N/A
4.73	December 26, 1995	Harrison Ford	Jewel Kilcher
4.74	December 27, 1995	Robert Downey Jr.	Martina McBride
4.75	December 28, 1995	Carl LaBove, Jean-Claude Van Damme	N/A
4.76	December 29, 1995	Gary Barnett, Gena Lee Nolin	Donna Summer
