= W21BF =

Television station in Fremont, Ohio (1989–1999)

Fremont, Ohio; United States
- Channels: Analog: 21 (UHF)

Programming
- Affiliations: Channel America, Main Street TV

Ownership
- Owner: TV 21, Inc.

History
- First air date: October 1989
- Last air date: October 5, 1999
- Former call signs: W02BY (1989–1993)
- Former channel numbers: 2 (VHF, 1989–1993)

Technical information
- Licensing authority: FCC
- Facility ID: 59613
- Class: TX
- ERP: 1 kW
- HAAT: 68 m (223 ft)
- Transmitter coordinates: 41°21′39.57″N 83°4′51.58″W

Links
- Public license information: Public file; LMS

W21BF (channel 21) was a low-power television station in Fremont, Ohio, United States. The station operated from studios in the Fremont Plaza Shopping Center on the city's east side.

== History ==
Seeway Broadcasters was granted a construction permit for a new low-power television station in Fremont on January 4, 1989, and the company announced plans to begin broadcasting in August. W02BY had signed on the air by October 14, when it aired its first local high school football telecast. It was broadcasting 24 hours a day by January 1990.

W02BY was removed by the local Fremont Cablevision cable system in April 1992 when three-quarters of subscribers surveyed preferred another station. The manager of the system said that channel 2 had provided only sporadic local programming and less than it had initially promised. The station responded by increasing its local programming and affiliating with the Main Street TV network, which provided a similar mix of classic shows to Channel America, previously carried on W02BY.

After seven months off the air, W02BY became W21BF and moved to channel 21 on October 29, 1993. As part of the channel change, the station bought a tower from Lucas County and relocated its transmitter and antenna there, while Sandusky County bought the land. The station continued as a local independent, complete with locally produced sports and news programming as well as programs from Main Street. It benefited from a 1995 FCC ruling that required the cable system serving some communities in the station's broadcast area to carry channel 21.

However, W21BF began to struggle financially in late 1996. It ceased paying the rent to Sandusky County for the tower, and at the start of 1998, it was warned that the station might only have nine months left on the air due to $5,000 of back rent; if the county were to buy the tower, it would order W21BF to remove its equipment from the site.

A station stockholder, Futronics, stepped up to pay what the station owed the county, becoming the owner of the tower. However, the reprieve was short-lived. In mid-1999, Futronics gave the station five days to purchase it or its equipment would be removed. In response, the station held an auction but only could raise $18,665 of the $20,000 necessary to purchase the structure. On October 5, 1999, with the station still $1,400 short, Futronics shut the power to the site, taking W21BF off the air. To make matters worse, the FCC had granted the cable company's petition to remove W21BF from its systems because it could not receive a strong enough signal at its headend in 1998.

The matter went to court, where W21BF, Futronics and land owner Sandusky County attempted to resolve the complicated legal situation that had arisen. The suit was dropped when Futronics revealed an embarrassing bombshell: that W21BF was operating on an expired license and had not filed for renewal. As station officials scrambled to rectify their omission, the county, which purchased the tower, refused to let channel 21 use it; the station never returned to the air.
