= Geechy Guy =

American stand-up comedian (1964–2023)

- Born: Michael Paul Cathers; May 12, 1964; Rochester, Michigan, U.S.
- Died: September 7, 2023 (aged 59); Las Vegas, Nevada, U.S.
- Spouse: Sharon Alta Cathers

Comedy career
- Years active: c. 1983–2023
- Medium: Stand-up

Michael Paul Cathers (May 12, 1964 – September 7, 2023), better known as Geechy Guy, was an American stand-up comedian.

== Early life ==
Geechy Guy was born in Rochester, Michigan. He began his career as a magician at age 6, followed by juggling and unicycling until taking up comedy at age 19. Guy began his career in the Detroit market, working comedy clubs and appearing on local comedy talk shows, such as "Some Semblance of Sanity" with comedian Gary Thison.

== Career ==
Guy was a contestant on Star Search during the 1990–1991 season; he defeated, among others, Ray Romano in the competition. On January 7, 2011, he appeared on The Late Late Show with Craig Ferguson. He also appeared at the 2011 NASCAR Newlyweds trivia game during Champions Week for a brief act before the drivers arrived. Also in 2011, he was a contestant on the sixth season of America's Got Talent. He reached the top 48 and was buzzed by Piers Morgan. Guy was eliminated from the show after that. He appeared three times in the past on The Tonight Show with Jay Leno. He was the opening act on Ron White's Comedy Salute to the Troops 2014, initially aired on March 14 of that year.

== Guinness World Records ==
Although often making the claim, Geechy Guy never held a Guinness World Record for most jokes told in an hour, at 676. The highest recorded offer is 550 Jokes made by Australian comedian Taylor Goodwin.

== Death ==
Cathers died in Las Vegas on September 7, 2023, at the age of 59. His cause of death remains undisclosed.
