= Travis T. Flory =

American actor

- Born: May 24, 1992 (age 33); Fontana, California, US
- Occupation(s): Actor, singer
- Years active: 1999–2015

Travis T. Flory (born May 24, 1992 in Fontana, California) is an American singer and actor best known for his role as Joey Caruso on Everybody Hates Chris. He has been a resident in a small city named Yucaipa, California.

== Filmography ==
=== Film ===
- The 12 Dogs of Christmas (2005) as Denny Doyle
- License to Wed (2007) as Church Kid Manny
- Mostly Ghostly: Who Let the Ghosts Out? (2008) as Billy
- Step Brothers (2008) as Red-head kid
- Little Boy (2015) as Soda Fountain Clerk

=== Television ===
- The Bernie Mac Show
- Becker (1999) as Kid on ice (1999, one episode)
- Band of Brothers (2001) as Dutch Resistance kid
- Zoey 101 (2005) as Jake (2005, one episode)
- Nip/Tuck (2006) as Morgan Thompson (2006, one episode)
- Everybody Hates Chris (2005–2009) as Joey Caruso (recurring role)
- Gary Unmarried (2009, one episode) as Wrestling coach's son (Gary's Big Mouth)
