= CNN Checkout Channel =

Out-of-home advertising service

- Country: United States
- Headquarters: Atlanta, Georgia, US

Programming
- Language: English

Ownership
- Owner: Turner Private Networks (Turner Broadcasting System); ActMedia
- Sister channels: CNN; CNN Headline News

History
- Launched: February 20, 1992
- Closed: March 31, 1993

CNN Checkout Channel was a satellite television network operated by ActMedia and Turner Broadcasting System through its CNN and Turner Private Networks subsidiaries. The network was a place-based out-of-home advertising service, fed via televisions installed in the checkout lines of participating supermarkets. The service carried a mixture of news programming provided by CNN, accompanied by national advertising sold by the network. Costs of installing the service's equipment were covered by Turner, and stores received a share of national advertising revenue.

By 1993, CNN Checkout Channel was carried in 840 stores. Reception to the service was mixed; some were neutral to the concept, while cashiers at its participating stores found the in-store televisions broadcasting its programming to be distracting. After believing that it would be too difficult to make the service profitable, Turner discontinued CNN Checkout Channel in March 1993, and took a write-down of $16 million.

== Background ==
CNN Checkout Channel was first announced in September 1990 as a joint venture between the marketing firm ActMedia, who provided a startup cost of nearly $70 million, and CNN, who provided content for the service. Turner Broadcasting System would have an option to acquire an equity stake. Turner operated Checkout Channel through its Turner Private Networks subsidiary, which also operated CNN Airport Network.

The service was conceptualized by Richard Larsen, an MIT professor of queueing theory; he explained that "waiting in a supermarket checkout line is something we all experience daily. We're hassled by high levels of stress and frustration. It's a subtle form of imprisonment, but the Checkout Channel changes empty time to informative and productive time." CNN Checkout Channel was initially trialed at a Kroger location in Detroit. For its wider roll-out, it was introduced at stores in markets such as Atlanta, Charlotte, Columbus, Los Angeles, New York City, Philadelphia, Providence, and San Jose. Acme Markets, A&P, Finast, and Kroger served as partner chains for the service.

The CNN Checkout Channel broadcast blocks of news programming, interspersed with commercial advertising. National advertising packages with exclusivity in certain product segments were sold in quarterly and yearly packages. ActMedia president Wayne LoCurto explained that advertising rates for CNN Checkout Channel were comparable to those of traditional daytime television. Among the launch advertisers were Coca-Cola, Campbell's, Ford Motor Company, Kraft, Kimberly Clark, and Walt Disney World. The service also covered the costs of installation and equipment (such as televisions and the satellite system), and participating stores received a cut of advertising revenue.

The launch of CNN Checkout Channel was meant to provide another platform for CNN content besides television at home; Turner Private Networks vice president Scott Weiss explained that "I think we are reacting to what we believe is an insatiable appetite in our generation for information. They want it live. They want it now, on an instant basis." ActMedia had predicted that CNN Checkout Channel would operate in at least 5,000 stores by 1992, offering at least 60 million impressions per-week. However, by 1993, CNN Checkout Channel was only available at a total of 840 stores covering 17 markets.

== Programming ==
The Philadelphia Inquirer likened CNN Checkout Channel to a "cut-down" version of CNN Headline News; its news programming consisted of summaries of headlines and short feature segments. Commercials, which last 15 to 30 seconds, took 40 percent of the airtime. The service's news content was tailored to different demographics based on two dayparts; the stories focused more on women by day and men by night. CNN held full editorial control over the content broadcast by the CNN Checkout Channel, and had a staff of 30 employees dedicated to the service.

The service broadcast programming in 8- to 10-minute blocks, with advertisements broadcast in between; 8 minutes was calculated as the average waiting time in a supermarket checkout line. News programming would be updated throughout the day, and the network would also be able to present "live in short form" coverage of breaking news events when warranted. Michael Rourke, then-vice president of A&P, explained that the televisions could also be used to display in-store content.

== Reception and demise ==
CNN Checkout Channel received mixed reviews; a representative of Acme Market reported that the service had received varying responses from its customers, stating that "some people love it, some people are oblivious to it, some people hate it. The predominant number don't respond to it at all." Similar responses to the service were also gauged in interviews of shoppers by the Philadelphia Inquirer at an Acme location.

Cashiers working at stores that had installed the CNN Checkout Channel found the service to be distracting; in an Associated Press report of CNN Checkout Channel's launch, a cashier told a reporter that the repeating commercials played by the television was "driving [her] crazy". In response to similar complaints, some stores turned down the volume on the televisions to nearly inaudible levels—which at the same time, defeated the purpose of the service by hindering the ability for customers to hear its commercials. Martin Sloane of The Daily Gazette felt that the concept of airing commercials in the checkout line was flawed, as CNN Checkout Channel programming "did not preempt the anxiety of waiting in the checkout line" and that "by the time shoppers glanced at the Checkout Channel, they had already decided what they were going to buy. And they weren't about to lose their place in line to make some last-minute impulse purchases."

In February 1993, Turner announced the discontinuation of the CNN Checkout Channel, taking a $16 million write-down. Turner cited difficulties in making the service profitable as justification for the shutdown. A further expansion, which would have added "several thousand" locations to the network at a cost of $35 million, was aborted by the shutdown. Stores that wished to keep the televisions were offered a feed of CNN Headline News as a replacement.
