= Al Lubel =

American stand-up comedian

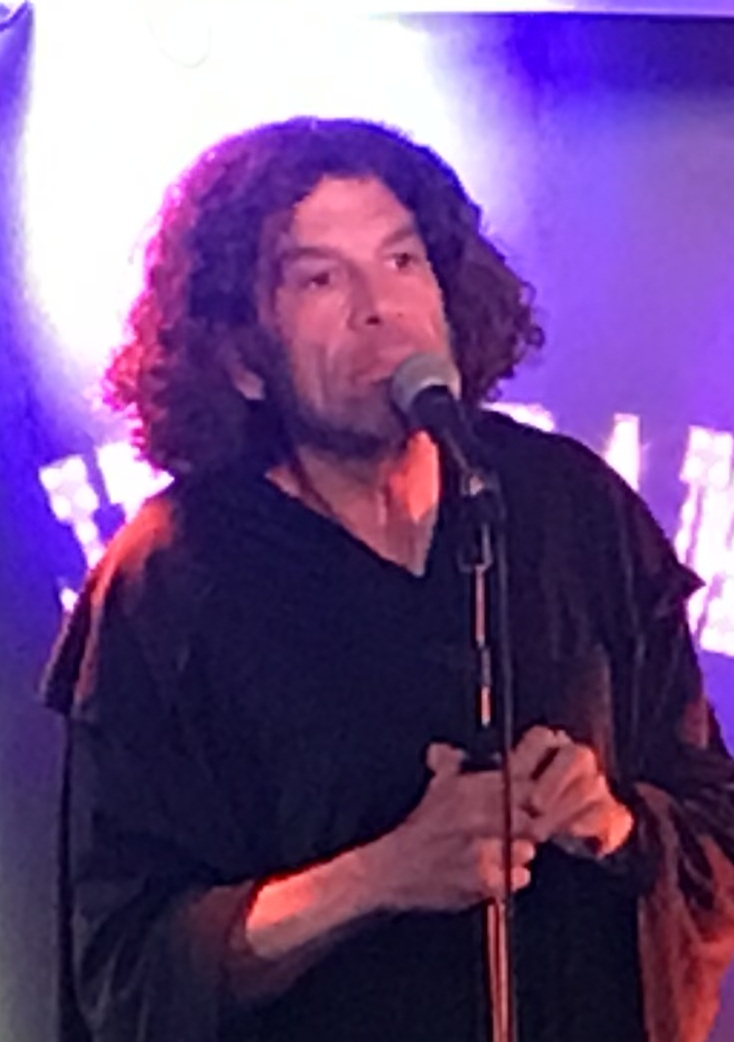
- Lubel in 2024
- Born: 1956 (age 69–70); Queens, New York, U.S.
- Occupations: Comedian, actor
- Website: allubel.com

Al Lubel (born 1956) is an American comedian and actor.

== Early life and education ==
Lubel was born in Queens to a Jewish family. He grew up in Florida. He went to college in Florida and graduated from the University of Miami School of Law and then moved to California where he passed the California Bar Exam. He practiced law for four years while moonlighting doing stand-up, and left the bar in 1986.

== Career ==
Lubel won Star Search in the comedian category in 1988, winning $100,000. He was the subject of an episode of the BBC series Funny Business in 1992. He appeared on The Tonight Show, one of the last comedians to perform while Johnny Carson was the host. He has appeared on the Late Show with David Letterman five times beginning in 2001; Letterman told him "There's something wrong with you Al." He won the Edinburgh Fringe Festival's Amused Moose Award in 2013.

A documentary, Mentally Al, was created by writer/director Joshua Edelman in 2020 that follows Lubel's life. In it, Sarah Silverman calls him one of the first alternative comedians. The film was named Best Comedy Documentary in the New York Times' comedy roundup in 2021.
