= David Meek =

American businessman (born 1963)

David Meek (born September 12, 1963) is an American businessman. He held various global executive positions in major pharmaceutical and biotechnology companies.

In July 2016, the board of directors of Ipsen (Euronext: IPN), a French pharmaceutical company, appointed Meek as chief executive officer. In December 2019, Meek announced his resignation from the position as CEO to take the roles of President and chief executive officer of FerGene in January 2020. In September 2021, he became the chief executive officer of Mirati Therapeutics.

== Early life ==
David Meek attended University of Cincinnati. There, he enrolled in the ROTC program, and after university, served in Operation Desert Storm as a second lieutenant. He served for five years.

== Career ==
In January 2001, he began his career as national field sales director CNS and primary care in Janssen Biotech, Pharmaceutical Companies of Johnson & Johnson (until December 2004 based in Titusville, New Jersey).

He later joined Novartis Pharmaceuticals ($NVS), where he ran the company's respiratory and dermatology franchise in Switzerland (January 2005 – June 2007) before heading up operations in Canada (CEO & president, June 2007 – January 2010) and later running its oncology business in Europe (January 2010 – August 2012).

He has not only been in the pharmaceutical industry, however, and before joining Baxter he was the COO of Endocyte ($ECYT) from August 2012 to July 2014, based in Indianapolis.

He later joined Baxter International Inc. as head of oncology division (July 2014 – June 2015, based in Cambridge, Massachusetts).

He was executive vice-president and president of the oncology division of Baxalta Inc., which was recently acquired by Shire (July 2015 – July 2016 based in Cambridge, Massachusetts).

In July 2016, the board of directors of Ipsen (Euronext: IPN; ADR: IPSEY) appointed Meek as chief executive officer, effective July 18, 2016.

In December 2019, Meek resigned as CEO of Ipsen to become president and CEO of the newly founded FerGene in January 2020, which is based in Cambridge, Massachusetts, and is a subsidiary of Ferring Pharmaceuticals which is a biopharmaceutical company based in Saint-Prex, Switzerland.

In April 2021, after FerGene's struggling performance, Meek left FerGene and would later become the CEO of Mirati Therapeutics in September 2021, which is based in San Diego, California.
