= List of United States pay television channels =

This article lists pay television networks or channels broadcasting or receivable in the United States, organized by broadcast area and genre.

Some television providers use one or more channel slots for east/west feeds, high definition services, secondary audio programming and access to video on demand. Not all channels are available on all providers and some are also available on free-to-air stations.

The scope of this list is limited to channels broadcast via cable, satellite or terrestrial providers only and does not include channels streamed exclusively online.

This list may be incomplete and uses limited sources relative to the 2,675 television providers in the United States.

== National channels ==
The following channels are available on pay television systems across the United States.

Key	Description
Launch Date	The date the channel first started broadcasting, not necessarily the date its founding company was created.
OTA	If Yes, this channel has affiliations with free-to-air terrestrial networks. See also; List of United States over-the-air television networks.
East/West	If Yes, this channel offers time-shifted feeds of its network.
HD	If Yes, this channel offers a High Definition feed. See also; High-definition television in the United States.
VOD	If Yes, this channel offers video on demand content to providers.
SAP	If Yes, this channel offers secondary audio programming to providers, this usually contains either audio description or a Spanish language dub.
Households	The total number of households with viewing access to the channel (not including households where the channel is available but not subscribed to).

=== English language ===
Genre	Name	Logo	Owner	Subsidiary	Launch Date	OTA	East/West	HD	VOD	SAP	Households	Notes
Variety	&TV		Zee Entertainment Enterprises		2016	-	-	Yes	-	-		
Variety	365BLK		Free TV Networks		2024	Yes						Launched as The365 on January 1, 2024. Became 365BLK on January 1, 2025.
Variety	A&E		Hearst Communications	A+E Global Media	1984	-	Yes			-	90,343,000	Formerly known as Arts & Entertainment Network and A&E Network. Formed by the merger of ARTS and The Entertainment Channel in 1984.
Variety	ABC		The Walt Disney Company	Disney Entertainment Television	1943	Yes			-	Yes	114,848,000	Major commercial network
Variety	Ace TV		Aspen Hill Media Group		2018	Yes						
Variety	AFN Prime		American Forces Network		1954	Yes						
Variety	American Forces Network		American Forces Network		1942							Owned by the United States Department of Defense
Variety	Antenna TV		Nexstar Media Group		2010	Yes	-	-	-	-	-	Classic television series
Variety	Aspire TV		Magic Johnson Enterprises		2012	-	-	Yes	-	-		
Variety	AWE		Herring Networks inc.		2004	-	-	Yes	-	-		Launched as Wealth TV
Variety	AXS TV		Anthem Sports & Entertainment (majority stake) /2929 Entertainment/AEG (AXS TV, LLC)		2001	-	Yes			-		Launched as HDNet
Variety	BBC America		AMC Global Media		1998	-	Yes			-	71,343,000	
Variety	BET		Skydance	BET Media Group	1980	-	Yes			-	83,897,000	Mainly aimed at African-American/Black people
Variety	Bounce TV		E. W. Scripps Company	Scripps Networks	2011	Yes	-	Yes	-	-	28,000,000	
Variety	Bravo		NBCUniversal	Media Group/Cable Entertainment Group	1980	-	Yes		-	-	87,213,000	
Variety	Buzzr		Fremantle North America		2015	Yes	-	-	-	-	-	Classic game shows
Variety	Catchy Comedy		Weigel Broadcasting		2015	Yes	-	-	-	-		Launched as Decades
Variety	CBS		Skydance	CBS Entertainment Group	1927	Yes			-	Yes	114,848,000	Major commercial network. Formerly known as Columbia Broadcasting System, Inc., and CBS, Inc.
Variety	Cleo TV		Urban One		2019	-	-	Yes	-	-		
Variety	CMT		Skydance	Skydance TV	1983	-	Yes			-	75,182,000	Originally Country Music Television, launched as CMTV
Variety	Confess by Nosey		Nosey Baxter, LLC		2021	Yes	-	Yes	-	-		
Variety	Cozi TV		NBC Owned Television Stations (NBCUniversal Television and Streaming)		2009	Yes		Yes			111,000,000	
Variety	The Florida Channel		Florida State University; Florida Legislature		1996	Yes						
Variety	Polsat 1		Telewizja Polsat		2015	-	-	-	-	-		
Variety	TVN International		TVN Group		2004	-	-	Yes	-	-		
Variety	TVN International Extra		TVN Group		2015	-	-	Yes	-	-		
Variety	Dabl		Skydance (operated by Weigel Broadcasting)		2019	Yes	-	-	-	-		
Variety	Discovery Channel		Skydance	Skydance TV	1985	-	Yes			-	91,388,000	Launched as The Discovery Channel
Variety	E!		Versant		1987	-	-	-	-	-	89,488,000	Launched as Movie Time
Variety	ES.TV		Entertainment Studios Networks		2009	-	-	Yes	-	-		
Variety	FETV		Family Broadcasting Corporation		2013	-	Yes			-	75,000	Classic television series
Variety	First Nations Experience (FNX)		San Bernardino Community College District		2011	-	Yes			-	75,000	
Variety	Fox		Fox Corporation	Fox Entertainment Media	1986	Yes			-	Yes	114,848,000	Major commercial network.
Variety	Fuse		Fuse Media, LLC		1994	-	-	Yes		-		Merged with NuvoTV in 2015.
Variety	Game Show Central		Sony Pictures Television		2020	Yes		Yes				
Variety	Game Show Network		Sony Pictures Television		1994	-	Yes	-				
Variety	Great		Sony Pictures Television		2013	Yes	-	-	-	-	78,144,000	Classic shows
Variety	Heroes & Icons		Weigel Broadcasting		2014	Yes	-	Yes	-	-		Airs reruns of classic action television series
Variety	Ion Television		E. W. Scripps Company		1998	Yes	Yes			-	85,248,000	Mainly airs recent procedural drama reruns. Formerly known as Pax TV and i: Independent Television
Variety	Ion Plus		E. W. Scripps Company		2007	Yes	Yes			Yes		
Variety	MeTV		Weigel Broadcasting		2005	Yes	-	Yes	Classic television series		99,456,000	
Variety	MeTV+		Weigel Broadcasting		2021	Yes	-	-	-	-	-	Classic television series
Variety	MeTV Toons		Weigel Broadcasting		2024	-	-	-	-	-	-	Classic animation
Variety	MTV		Skydance	Skydance TV	1981	-	Yes			-	87,573,000	Originally Music Television
Variety	MTV2		Skydance	Skydance TV	1996	-	Yes			-	75,412,000	Formerly known as M2 and The Box
Variety	Minnesota Channel		Twin Cities Public Television		2007	-	Yes			-	75,000	
Variety	MyNetworkTV		Fox Corporation	Fox Entertainment Media	2006	Yes			-	Yes	100,640,000	Commercial/syndication service
Variety	NBC		NBCUniversal	NBCUniversal Media Group	1926	Yes			-	Yes	114,848,000	Major commercial network
Variety	Nosey		Nosey Baxter, LLC		2022	Yes						
Variety	INFAST		Insight TV		2022			Yes				
Variety	Ovation		Hubbard Broadcasting		1996	-	-	Yes		-		Known as Ovation TV from 2007 to 2010.
Variety	PBS		Nonprofit organization		1969	Yes	-	Yes		Yes	113,664,000	Public television. Replaced National Educational Television (NET).
Variety	Pop		Skydance	Skydance TV	1981	-	Yes		-	-	72,820,000	Formerly known as Electronic Program Guide, Prevue Guide, Prevue Channel, TV Guide Channel, TV Guide Network and TVGN
Variety	Retro TV		Get After It Media		2005	-	-	Yes	-	-		
Variety	Rewind TV		Nexstar Media Group		2021	Yes	-	-	-	-	-	Classic television series
Variety	RFD-TV		Rural Media Group		2000	-	-	Yes	-	-		
Variety	Soul of the South Television		SSN Media Group, LP		2013	-	-	Yes	-	-		
Variety	TBS		Skydance	Skydance TV	1967	-	Yes		Yes		91,671,000	Formerly known as WJRJ-TV, WTCG-TV, SuperStation WTBS and TBS Superstation
Variety	The CW		Nexstar Media Group (81.1%)/Skydance (18.9%)		2006	Yes	Yes		-	Yes	114,848,000	Minor commercial network. Replaced UPN and The WB.
Variety	The CW Plus		Nexstar Media Group (81.1%)/Skydance (18.9%)		2006	Yes	Yes		-	Yes	73,120,898	Commercial/syndication service. Replaced The WB 100+ Stations Group.
Variety	TheGrio		Allen Media Group		2016	-	-	-	-	-	-	Formerly known as Light TV from 2016 to 2021.
Variety	TruTV		Skydance	Skydance TV	1991	-	-	-	-	-	86,832,000	Formerly known as Court TV from 1991 to December 31, 2007.
Variety	TVP Polonia		Telewizja Polska		1992 (trial); 1993 (regularly)			Yes				
Variety	TVP Wilno		Telewizja Polska		2019	-	-	Yes	-	-		
Variety	TV One		Urban One		2004	-	-	-	-	-	-	
Variety	USA Network		Versant		1977	-	-	-	-	-	91,429,000	Launched as Madison Square Garden Sports Network
Variety	WEST		Weigel Broadcasting		2025	Yes	-	Yes	-	-		
Variety	VH1		Skydance	Skydance TV	1985	-	-	-	-	-	87,568,000	Formerly known as VH-1/VH-1: Video Hits One and VH1: Music First
Variety	YTA TV		Invincible Entertainment Corp.		1985	Yes						
Variety	Zee TV		Zee Entertainment Enterprises		1992	-	-	Yes	-	-		
Lifestyle	Beauty Channel		United Global Media Group, Inc.		2012	-	-	-	-	-	-	Launched as Salon TV
Lifestyle	Cooking Channel		Skydance	Skydance TV	2010	-	-	Yes		-	63,756,000	Replaced Fine Living Network
Lifestyle	Craftsy TV		TN Marketing		2023							
Lifestyle	Create		American Public Television		2006	Yes	-	-	-	-	87,616,000	Public television/instructional
Lifestyle	Defy		Scripps Networks (2021–2024); Free TV Networks (50%, 2024–present); A+E Global Media (50%, 2024–present)		2021	Yes		Yes				
Lifestyle	FidoTV		Tad Walden		2015	Yes						
Lifestyle	Destination America		Skydance	Skydance TV	1996	-	Yes			-	52,687,000	Formerly known as Discovery Travel and Living, Discovery Home and Leisure, Discovery Home and Planet Green
Lifestyle	Discovery Life		Skydance	Skydance TV	2011	-	-	Yes		-	46,508,000	Replaced FitTV on February 1, 2011; formed by merger of Discovery Health and FitTV. Launched as Discovery Fit & Health
Lifestyle	Magnolia Network		Skydance	Skydance TV	1999	-	-	Yes		-	58,368,000	Formerly DIY Network
Lifestyle	Dog TV		PTV Media		2012	-	-	Yes	-	-		
Lifestyle	Fashion One		Bigfoot Entertainment		2010			Yes				
Lifestyle	FashionTV		Michel Adam Lisowski		1997			Yes				
Lifestyle	Food Network		Skydance	Skydance TV	1993	-	Yes			-	92,873,000	Launched as Television Food Network
Lifestyle	FYI		Hearst Communications	A+E Global Media	1999	-	Yes			-	63,338,000	Launched as The Biography Channel
Lifestyle	Great American Faith & Living		Great American Media		2014	-	Yes			-	-	Formerly known as Ride TV and Great American Living
Lifestyle	HGTV		Skydance	Skydance TV	1994	-	Yes			-	90,949,000	Launched as Home & Garden Television
Lifestyle	Lifetime		Hearst Communications	A+E Global Media	1984	-	Yes			Yes	90,296,000	
Lifestyle	LMN		Hearst Communications	A+E Global Media	1998	-	-	Yes	-	-	75,338,000	Formerly known as Lifetime Movie Network and Lifetime Movies
Lifestyle	LRW		Hearst Communications	A+E Global Media	2001	-	-	-	-	-	75,338,000	
Lifestyle	Localish		The Walt Disney Company	ABC Owned Television Stations	2009	Yes		Yes				Formerly known as Live Well Network
Lifestyle	Logo TV		Skydance	Skydance TV	2005	-	Yes			-	48,270,000	
Lifestyle	MyDestination.TV		Entertainment Studios Networks		2009	-	-	Yes	-	-		
Lifestyle	Oprah Winfrey Network		Skydance (95%)/Harpo Productions (5%)		2011	-	Yes			-	77,705,000	
Lifestyle	Pets.TV		Entertainment Studios Networks		2009	-	-	Yes	-	-		
Lifestyle	Recipe.TV		Entertainment Studios Networks		2009	-	-	Yes	-	-		
Lifestyle	Tastemade		Wonder Group		2018							
Lifestyle	Z Living		NIA Broadcasting, Inc.		2007							
Lifestyle	FNL Network		Rocco Leo Gaglioti		2015	Yes						
Lifestyle	Here TV		Here Media		2002	Yes						
Lifestyle	TLC		Skydance	Skydance TV	1980	-	Yes			-	89,764,000	Formerly known as Appalachian Community Service Network and The Learning Channel
Lifestyle	Travel Channel		Skydance	Skydance TV	1987	-	Yes			-	84,215,000	Launched as The Travel Channel
Lifestyle	We TV		AMC Global Media		1997	-	Yes			-	86,094,000	Formerly known as Romance Classics and WE: Women's Entertainment
Factual	American Heroes Channel		Skydance	Skydance TV	1998	-	-	-	-		53,890,000	Formerly known as Discovery Wings and Military Channel
Factual	Animal Planet		Skydance	Skydance TV	1996	-	Yes			-	88,859,000	
Factual	Busted		Free TV Networks		2025	Yes						
Factual	CGTN Documentary		China Global Television Network		2011			Yes				Formerly known as CCTV-9 Documentary
Factual	Crime & Investigation		Hearst Communications	A+E Global Media	2005	-	-	Yes		-		
Factual	EarthxTV		EarthX									
Factual	History		Hearst Communications	A+E Global Media	1995	-	Yes			-	90,888,000	Launched as The History Channel
Factual	Ion Mystery		E. W. Scripps Company		2014	Yes	-	-	-	-	-	Launched as Escape and rebranded as Court TV Mystery in 2019
Factual	Investigation Discovery		Skydance	Skydance TV	1996	-	Yes			-	84,732,000	Formerly known as Discovery Civilization Network: The World History and Geography Channel, Discovery Civilization Channel and Discovery Times
Factual	INWONDER		Insight TV		2022			Yes				
Factual	True Crime Network		Tegna Inc.		2014	Yes	-	-	-	-	92,936,000	True Crime/Investigation (formerly known as Justice Network)
Factual	Law & Crime Network		LawNewz, LLC		2018	Yes						
Factual	Military History		Hearst Communication	A+E Global Media	2005	-	-	-	-	-		Launched as Military History Channel
Factual	Discovery Turbo		Skydance/Source Interlink (Motor Trend Group)		2002	-	-	Yes	-	-	71,436,000	Formerly known as Discovery HD Theater, HD Theater, Velocity and Motor Trend
Factual	Nat Geo Wild		The Walt Disney Company (Walt Disney Television) (73%)/National Geographic Society (27%)		2010	-	-	Yes	Yes		58,124,000	
Factual	National Geographic		The Walt Disney Company (Walt Disney Television) (73%)/National Geographic Society (27%)		2001	-	Yes			-	89,348,000	Launched as National Geographic Channel
Factual	NBC True CRMZ		NBCUniversal Owned Television Stations		2024	Yes						
Factual	Oxygen		Versant		2000	Yes				-	75,298,000	
Factual	Science Channel		Skydance	Skydance TV	1996	-	-	Yes		-	68,258,000	Formerly known as Discovery Science, Discovery Science Channel, The Science Channel and Science
Factual	Smithsonian Channel		Skydance	Skydance TV	2007	-	Yes			-	36,830,000	
Factual	Story Television		Weigel Broadcasting		2022	Yes	-	-	-	-		
Factual	The Nest		Sinclair Broadcast Group		2023	Yes	-	-	-	-		Features content from A&E Television Networks, LLC
Factual	Vice TV		Hearst Communications (50%) (A+E Global Media)/Vice Media (50%)		2016	-	-	Yes	-		71,909,000	Formerly known as History International, H2 and Viceland
Factual	World Channel		American Public Television/The WNET Group/WGBH Educational Foundation/National Educational Telecommunications Association		2005	-	-	Yes	-	-		
Factual	Quest		Tegna Inc., a subsidiary of Nexstar Media Group		2018	Yes						
Scripted	AMC		AMC Networks		1984	-	-	Yes	-		90,552,000	Launched as American Movie Classics
Scripted	Binge TV		Cannella Media		2022	Yes						
Scripted	VET TV		John Acevedo (CEO) Justin Szerletich (CMO) Justice F. W. Pelton (VP of Production)		2017	Yes						
Scripted	Charge!		Sinclair Broadcast Group		2017	Yes	-	-	-			
Scripted	Comedy Central		Skydance	Skydance TV	1991	-	Yes			-	89,538,000	Launched as CTV: The Comedy Network; formed by merger of Viacom's HA! TV Comedy Network and The Comedy Channel
Scripted	Comedy.TV		Entertainment Studios Networks		2009	-	-	Yes	-	-		
Scripted	Comet		Sinclair Broadcast Group		2015	Yes	-	Yes	-	-	78,144,000	Sci-fi programming
Scripted	Freeform		The Walt Disney Company	Disney Entertainment Television	1977	-	Yes			-	89,117,000	Formerly known as CBN Satellite Service, CBN Cable Network, The CBN Family Channel, The Family Channel, Fox Family Channel, and ABC Family
Scripted	FX		The Walt Disney Company	Disney Entertainment Television	1994	-	Yes			Yes	90,060,000	Launched as fX
Scripted	FXX		The Walt Disney Company	Disney Entertainment Television	2013	-	Yes			-	85,573,000	Replaced Fox Soccer
Scripted	Grit		E. W. Scripps Company	Scripps Networks	2014	Yes	-	Yes	-	-	88,800,000	Action and westerns programming
Scripted	Hallmark Channel		Hallmark Cards	Hallmark Media	1992	-	Yes			-	121,400,000	Formerly known as VISN/ACTS, Faith and Values, and Odyssey
Scripted	Hallmark Family		Hallmark Cards	Hallmark Media	2017	-	-	Yes	-	-		Launched as Hallmark Drama
Scripted	Hallmark Mystery		Hallmark Cards	Hallmark Media	2004	-	-	Yes		-	63,900,000	Formerly known as Hallmark Movie Channel and Hallmark Movies & Mysteries
Scripted	IFC		AMC Networks		1994	-	Yes	Yes		-	71,343,000	Launched as Independent Film Channel
Scripted	Laff		E. W. Scripps Company	Scripps Networks	2015	Yes	-	-	-	-		
Scripted	Outlaw		Free TV Networks		2024	Yes						
Scripted	Paramount Network		Skydance	Skydance TV	1983	-	Yes	Yes		-	83,416,000	Formerly known as The Nashville Network, The National Network, and Spike
Scripted	Reelz		Hubbard Broadcasting		2006	-	-	Yes		Yes		Launched as ReelzChannel
Scripted	Roar		Sinclair Broadcast Group		2017	Yes	-	-	-	-		Launched as TBD
Scripted	Start TV		CBS News and Stations (50%) Weigel Broadcasting (50%)		2018	Yes	-	-	-	-		
Scripted	Syfy		Versant		1992	-	Yes			-	89,742,000	Formerly known as Sci-Fi Channel and Sci Fi
Scripted	TNT		Skydance	Skydance TV	1988	-	Yes				90,332,000	Launched as Turner Network Television. Airs drama programming.
Scripted	Toku		Olympusat, Inc.		2005	-	-	Yes	-	-		Launched as FUNimation Channel; Asian-Pacific programming. Anime, movies and series.
Scripted	Timeless TV		Cannella Media		2020	Yes						
Scripted	TV Land		Skydance	Skydance TV	1996	-	-	Yes		-	87,617,000	
Movies	Cinémoi		Cinemoi North America		2009	-	-	-	-	-		French-language movies
Movies	Family Movie Classics		Family Broadcasting Corporation		2021	-	-	Yes	-	-		Classic movies
Movies	FX Movie Channel		The Walt Disney Company	Disney Entertainment Television	1994	-	-	Yes		-	55,729,000	Launched as fXM – Movies from Fox; rebranded as Fox Movie Channel in 2000 and FXM on January 1, 2012.
Movies	HDNet Movies		Anthem Sports & Entertainment (majority stake) + 2929 Entertainment + AEG (AXS TV, LLC)		2003	-	-	Yes		-		
Movies	Magnificent Movies Network		Cannella Media		2019	Yes						
Movies	Miramax Movie Channel		Miramax		2021							
Movies	Movies!		Fox Corporation (through Fox Television Stations) (50%) / Weigel Broadcasting (50%)		2013	Yes						
Movies	MovieSphere Gold		Lionsgate Worldwide Television Distribution Group/ Debmar-Mercury		2025	-	-	Yes	-	-		
Movies	NOST		Classic Broadcasting, LLC.		2020	-	-	Yes	-	-		
Movies	PixL		PixL Inc.		2010			Yes				
Movies	ShortsTV		AMC Networks International (25%)/Shorts International (75%)		2010	-	-	-	Yes		-	
Movies	Sony Movies		Sony Pictures Television		2010	-	-	-	Yes			
Movies	Sundance TV		AMC Global Media		1996	-	Yes	-	Yes		65,505,000	Launched as Sundance Channel
Movies	Turner Classic Movies		Skydance	Skydance TV	1994	-	-	Yes	-	Yes		Also shortened as TCM
Music	BET Gospel		Skydance	Skydance TV	2002	-	-	Yes	-	-		
Music	BET Her		Skydance	Skydance TV	1996	-	-	Yes	-			Formerly known as BET on Jazz, BET Jazz, BET J, and Centric.
Music	BET Hip-Hop		Skydance	Skydance TV	2005	-	-	-	-			
Music	BET Jams		Skydance	Skydance TV	2002	-	-	-	-			Formerly known as MTVX and MTV Jams
Music	BET Soul		Skydance	Skydance TV	1998	-	-	-	-			Formerly known as VH1 Soul until 2015
Music	The Country Network		TCN Country, LLC		2009	Yes						
Music	Circle Country		Gray Media		2019							
Music	California Music Channel		California Music Channel		1982	Yes						
Music	Classic Arts Showcase		The Lloyd E. Rigler – Lawrence E. Deutsch Foundation		1994	Yes			-	Yes	114,848,000	Major commercial network
Music	CMT Music		Skydance	Skydance TV	1998	-	-	-				Formerly known as VH1 Country and CMT Pure Country
Music	FM		Fuse Media, LLC.		2015	-	-	Yes	-	-		
Music	Heartland		Get After It Media		2012	-	-	Yes	Yes	-	-	
Music	MTV Classic		Skydance	Skydance TV	1998	-	-	Yes	Yes		52,266,000	Formerly known as VH1 Smooth, VH1 Classic Rock and VH1 Classic
Music	MTV Live		Skydance	Skydance TV	2006	-	-	-	Yes		52,266,000	Formerly known as MHD and Palladia
Music	MTVU		Skydance	Skydance TV	2000	-	-	-	-	-		Launched as College Television Network
Music	Stingray Classica		Stingray Group		1995			Yes				
Music	Stingray CMusic		Stingray Group		2007			Yes				
Music	Stingray Djazz		Stingray Group		2012			Yes				
Music	Stingray iConcerts		Stingray Group		2003			Yes				
Music	Stingray Music		Stingray Group		1997			Yes				
Music	Revolt		Revolt Media & TV		2013	-	-	Yes	-	-		Features live concerts, documentaries, music videos and hip-hop themed feature films.
Children's and Family	3ABN Kids Network		Three Angels Broadcasting Network		2013	-	-	-	-	-		24/7 religious-based children's television network, formerly known as SonBeam Channel.
Children's and Family	Always Funny				2022							
Children's and Family	ANIME x HIDIVE		AMC Global Media	Sentai Filmworks	2023							
Children's and Family	BabyFirst		First Media		2006	-	-	Yes	-	Yes		
Children's and Family	BabyTV		The Walt Disney Company	Disney Entertainment Television	2003	-	Yes	Yes	-	Yes		
Children's and Family	Boomerang		Skydance	Cartoon Network Group	2000	-	-	Yes	Yes	Yes	42,585,000	
Children's and Family	Cartoon Network		Skydance	Cartoon Network Group	1992	-	Yes				90,788,000	The Cartoon Network portion of the network airs from 6 a.m. to 5 p.m. ET/PT on weekdays and Saturdays, 6 a.m. to 9 p.m. ET/PT on Sundays, during the daytime. The Adult Swim portion of the network airs from 5 p.m. to 6 a.m., during nighttime. In addition to this, on Adult Swim, Toonami airs English dubbed anime and action cartoons for mature audiences and currently airs every Saturday night through Sunday morning on a flexible late night schedule.
Children's and Family	Adult Swim		Skydance	Cartoon Network Group	2001	-	Yes				90,788,000	The Cartoon Network portion of the network airs from 6 a.m. to 5 p.m. ET/PT on weekdays and Saturdays, 6 a.m. to 9 p.m. ET/PT on Sundays, during the daytime. The Adult Swim portion of the network airs from 5 p.m. to 6 a.m., during nighttime. In addition to this, on Adult Swim, Toonami airs English dubbed anime and action cartoons for mature audiences and currently airs every Saturday night through Sunday morning on a flexible late night schedule.
Children's and Family	Crunchyroll Channel		Sony Pictures Entertainment Aniplex	Sony Music Entertainment Japan	2023	Yes						
Children's and Family	Discovery Family		Skydance (60%)/Hasbro (40%)	Cartoon Network Group	1996	-	-	Yes		-	62,169,000	Formerly known as Discovery Kids Channel, Discovery Channel Kids, Discovery Kids, The Hub and Hub Network
Children's and Family	Disney Channel		The Walt Disney Company	Disney Entertainment Television	1983	-	Yes				91,312,000	Launched as The Disney Channel
Children's and Family	Disney Jr.		The Walt Disney Company	Disney Entertainment Television	2012	-	Yes				72,167,000	Programming and branding also included in morning preschool block airing on Disney Channel
Children's and Family	Disney XD		The Walt Disney Company	Disney Entertainment Television	1998	-	Yes				74,710,000	Formerly known as Toon Disney and Jetix until February 13, 2009
Children's and Family	Duck TV		Mega Max Media s.r.o		2007	-	-	Yes	-	-	45,472,000	Formerly known as Bebe TV
Children's and Family	Great American Family		Great American Media		1995	-	-	Yes	-	-	56,352,000	Formerly known as Great American Country as an all-music channel
Children's and Family	Hasbro Legends		Get After It Media		2026	Yes		Yes				
Children's and Family	INSP		The Inspiration Networks		1978	-	-	-	-		67,400,00	Formerly known as PTL Network, PTL Satellite Network, PTL – The Inspirational Network and The Inspiration Network.
Children's and Family	Nick Jr. Channel		Skydance	Nickelodeon Group	2009	-	Yes			-	71,946,000	Replaced Noggin, which was later relaunched as a streaming app from 2015 to 2024.
Children's and Family	Nickelodeon/Nick at Nite		Skydance	Nickelodeon Group	1979 (Nickelodeon); 1985 (Nick at Nite)	-	Yes			Yes	89,108,000	Originally launched as a local channel on the QUBE system under the name as "Pinwheel". Nick at Nite is the primary nighttime programming block on Nickelodeon and is mainly aimed at adults and families.
Children's and Family	NickMusic		Skydance	Nickelodeon Group	2002	-	-	-	-	-		Launched as MTV Hits
Children's and Family	Nicktoons		Skydance	Nickelodeon Group	2002	-	Yes			-	62,095,000	Formerly known as Nicktoons TV and Nicktoons Network.
Children's and Family	PBS Kids		PBS		1999	Yes		Yes	-	-	98,272,000	Children's programming
Children's and Family	Primo TV		V-me Media		2017	-	-	Yes	-	-		
Children's and Family	TeenNick		Skydance	Nickelodeon Group	2009	-	Yes	Yes	Yes	-	68,472,000	Channel space formerly held by Nickelodeon Games and Sports for Kids from 1999 until December 31, 2007 (April 23, 2009 on Dish because of problematic unknown factors) and The N until September 28, 2009.
Children's and Family	Up TV		InterMedia Partners		2004	-	-	Yes	Yes	-		Formerly known as Gospel Music Channel and GMC TV
Children's and Family	ZooMoo		Blue Ant Media		2013	-	-	Yes	-	-		
News	ABC News Live		The Walt Disney Company	Disney Entertainment Television	2018	Yes		Yes				
News	Connecticut Network		Connecticut General Assembly		1999	Yes		Yes				
News	TVP World		Telewizja Polska		2021	Yes						
News	AccuWeather Network		AccuWeather		2015	-	-	Yes	-			
News	Al Jazeera English		Al Jazeera Media Network		2006			Yes				
News	BBC News		BBC Studios		1991	-	-	Yes		-		Formerly known as BBC World Service Television, BBC World, and BBC World News
News	Biz Television		Center Post Media, Inc.		2009	Yes						
News	Bloomberg Television		Bloomberg L.P.		1994	-	-	Yes	-	-		Launched as Bloomberg Information TV
News	CBS News 24/7		Skydance	CBS Entertainment Group	2014	Yes						
News	AFN News		American Forces Network		1997	Yes						
News	China Global Television Network		China Media Group		1997	-	-	-	-	-		
News	China Global Television Network Espanol		China Media Group		2007	-	-	-	-	-		
News	Cheddar		Archetype		2016	-	-	Yes	-	-		
News	CNBC		Versant		1989	-	-	Yes		-	87,947,000	Launched as Consumer News and Business Channel
News	CNBC World		Versant		2001	-	-	Yes	-	-		
News	CNN		Skydance	CNN Worldwide	1980	-	-	Yes			91,567,000	National news and opinion
News	CNN International		Skydance	CNN Worldwide	1985	-	-	Yes	-	-		World news and opinion
News	Court TV		E. W. Scripps Company	Scripps Networks	1990 (as pay television network); 2019 (as OTA multicast network)	Yes	-	Yes	-	-	95,300,160	True crime/court news
News	C-SPAN		National Cable Satellite Corporation		1979	-	-	Yes	-	Yes		Covers the United States House of Representatives
News	C-SPAN 2		National Cable Satellite Corporation		1986	-	-	Yes	-	-		Covers the United States Senate and airs Book TV on weekends
News	C-SPAN 3		National Cable Satellite Corporation		2001	-	-	Yes	-	-		Covers other live events and airs archived historical programming
News	Euronews				1993			Yes				
News	Fox Business Network		Fox Corporation	Fox News Media	2007	-	-	Yes	-	-	83,791,000	
News	Fox News Channel		Fox Corporation	Fox News Media	1996	-	-	Yes	-	-	89,433,000	National news and opinion
News	Fox Weather		Fox Corporation	Fox News Media	2021			Yes				
News	France 24		French Republic		2006	-	-	-	-	-	-	
News	Free Speech TV		Public Communicators Inc.		1995	-	-	-	-	-		Public, non-profit channel
News	HLN		Skydance	Skydance TV	1982	-	-	Yes		-	90,651,000	Launched as CNN2, and later known as Headline News, CNN Headline News and HLN: Headline News.
News	i24NEWS		i24News		2017	-	-	Yes	-	-		United States cut in channel of i24NEWS; an international news channel based in New York City.
News	Justice Central		Entertainment Studios Networks		2009	-	-	Yes	-	-		
News	LiveNow from Fox		Fox Corporation		2014							Formerly known as NewsNow from Fox and CoronavirusNow
News	Local Now		Entertainment Studios Networks		2016	-	-	Yes	-	-		Local news and weather, national news and sports (available through 207 localized feeds; localized content varies depending on market); distributed via over-the-top MVPD services
News	MS NOW		Versant		1996	-	Yes			-	85,317,000	Formerly known as MSNBC (1996–2025)
News	Newsmax TV		Newsmax Media		2014	Yes	-	Yes	-	-	14,208,000	News/Documentaries/Conservative Talk
News	Newsmax2		Newsmax Media		2023			Yes				
News	NewsNation		Nexstar Media Group		1978	-	-	Yes	-		-	Formerly known as WGN, WGN Superstation and Superstation WGN, rebranded as NewsNation on March 1, 2021.
News	NHK World Japan		NHK		1998	-	-	Yes	-	-		Replaced NHK World
News	One America News Network		Herring Networks inc.		2013	-	-	-	-	-		In cooperation with The Washington Times.
News	Real America's Voice		Performance One Media		2018	-	-	-	-	-		News and conservative opinion. Launched as America's Voice News
News	Salem News Channel		Salem Media Group		2021	Yes						
News	Scripps News		E.W. Scripps Company		2008	-	-	-	-	-		Formerly Newsy
News	TheBlaze		Blaze Media Inc.		2018	-	-	-	-	-		
News	The First		The First Digital, Inc.		2019							
News	TYT Network		The Young Turks, LLC									
News	The Weather Channel		Entertainment Studios Networks		1982	-	-	Yes	Yes	-		IntelliStar 2
News	TRT World		TRT		2015			Yes				
News	WeatherNation TV		WeatherNation TV Inc.		2011	Yes	-	Yes	-	-	19,788,000	Weather network
News	Yahoo Finance		Yahoo		2018							
Sports	ACC Network		The Walt Disney Company (80%)/Hearst Communications (20%)	ESPN, LLC	2019	-	-	Yes	-	-		
Sports	BeIN Sports		beIN Media Group		2012	-	-	Yes	-	Yes		
Sports	BeIN Sports Xtra		beIN Media Group		2019	-	-	-	-	-		
Sports	Stadium		Silver Chalice		2017							
Sports	AFN Sports		American Forces Network		2001	Yes						
Sports	Big Ten Network		Fox Corporation (Fox Sports Media Group) (51%)/Big Ten Conference (49%)		2007	-	-	Yes		-		Multiplex Channels
Sports	Cars.TV		Entertainment Studios Networks		2009	-	-	Yes	-	-		
Sports	Carz & Trax		Cannella Media		2021	Yes		Yes				
Sports	CW Sports		The CW		2023							
Sports	CBS Sports Golazo Network		Skydance	CBS Entertainment Group	2023							
Sports	CBS Sports HQ		Skydance	CBS Entertainment Group	2018							
Sports	CBS Sports Network		Skydance	CBS Entertainment Group	2002	-	-	Yes	-			Formerly known as National College Sports Network, CSTV and CBS College Sports Network
Sports	Cowboy Channel		Teton Ridge		1979	-	-	Yes	-	-		Formerly known as National Christian Network and FamilyNet
Sports	ESPN		The Walt Disney Company (80%)/Hearst Communications (20%)	ESPN, LLC	1979	-	-	Yes	Yes		87,437,000	Has a reverse mirror feed
Sports	ESPN2		The Walt Disney Company (80%)/Hearst Communications (20%)	ESPN, LLC	1993	-	-	Yes	-	-	87,349,000	Has a reverse mirror feed
Sports	ESPNews		The Walt Disney Company (80%)/Hearst Communications (20%)	ESPN, LLC	1996	-	-	Yes	-	-		
Sports	ESPNU		The Walt Disney Company (80%)/Hearst Communications (20%)	ESPN, LLC	2005	-	-	Yes	Yes	-	68,574,000	
Sports	FIFA+		FIFA		2022							
Sports	Altitude Sports and Entertainment		Kroenke Sports & Entertainment		2004	Yes						
Sports	Fox Soccer Plus		Fox Corporation	Fox Sports Media Group	2005	-	-	-	-			Launched as Fox Sports Digital Networks, Replaced Setanta Sports USA on March 1, 2010.
Sports	Fox Sports 1		Fox Corporation	Fox Sports Media Group	2013	-	-	Yes		-	84,159,000	Replaced Speed
Sports	Fox Sports 2		Fox Corporation	Fox Sports Media Group	2013	-	-	Yes		-	50,164,000	Launched as Fuel TV
Sports	Fubo Sports Network		FuboTV		2019	Yes		Yes				
Sports	Golf Channel		Versant		1995	-	-	-	-	-	75,678,000	Launched as The Golf Channel
Sports	HBCU Go		Allen Media Group		2021							
Sports	MLB Extra Innings		Major League Baseball		1996	-	-	Yes	-	-		Nineteen multiplex channels for indemand systems on game HD channels
Sports	MLB Network		Major League Baseball		2009	-	-	Yes	-	-		Has a reverse mirror feed
Sports	MLB Strike Zone		Major League Baseball		2012	-	-	Yes	-	-		
Sports	NBA League Pass		National Basketball Association		1995	-	-	Yes	-	-		Nineteen multiplex channels on indemand systems on team HD channels
Sports	NBA TV		National Basketball Association		1999	-	-	Yes	-	Yes		Launched as NBA.com TV; Turner Sports operates the channel in association with the NBA.
Sports	NBCSN		NBCUniversal	NBC Sports Group	1995 (original) 2025 (revival)	-	-	Yes	-	-		Formerly known as Outdoor Life Network and Versus.
Sports	Next Level Sports		Lax United Marketing, LLC		2017	-	-	-	-			Replaced ONE World Sports, formerly Eleven Sports
Sports	NFL Network		National Football League		2003	-	-	Yes	-	-		
Sports	NFL RedZone		National Football League		2009	-	-	Yes	-	-		NFL Football (airs 1-8PM Sundays only) NFL Network version of red zone
Sports	NHL Center Ice		National Hockey League		2009	-	-	-	Yes	-		Nineteen multiplex channels (indemand systems on game HD channels)
Sports	NHL Network		NBCUniversal (NBCUniversal Sports Group) (15.6%)/National Hockey League (84.4%)		2007	-	-	Yes	-	-		
Sports	Outdoor Channel		Kroenke Sports & Entertainment		1994	-	-	Yes		-		Launched as The Outdoor Channel
Sports	Outside TV		Mariah Media		1994	-	-	-	-	-		Launched as RSN Television
Sports	Pickleball''tv''		Sinclair Broadcast Group; United Pickleball Association		2023							
Sports	Pursuit Channel		Anthem Media Group		2008	Yes	-	Yes	-	-	716,644	Hunting and fishing adventure programming
Sports	Racer Network		Racer Media & Marketing		2004	-	-	Yes	-	-		Launched as Maverick Television
Sports	Rev'n Action		Get After It Media		2026	-	-	Yes	-	-		Launched by merging Rev'n and The Action Channel
Sports	RVTV		Cannella Media		2019	Yes						
Sports	Ryz Sports Network		Hammad Zaidi		2024							
Sports	Scripps Sports Network		Scripps Sports		2026							
Sports	SEC Network		The Walt Disney Company (80%)/Hearst Communications (20%)	ESPN, LLC	2014	-	-	Yes		-		
Sports	Sportsman Channel		Kroenke Sports & Entertainment		2003	-	-	Yes		-		
Sports	Tennis Channel		Sinclair Broadcast Group		2003	-	-	Yes	-	-		
Sports	FanDuel TV		Betfair		1999	-	-	Yes	-	-		The interactive horse racing network
Sports	FanDuel Racing		Betfair		2003	-	-	-	-	-		Launched as HRTV
Sports	Untamed Sports TV		Olympusat, Inc.		2008	Yes	-	-	-	-	4,021,177	Sports/outdoors
Sports	Vegas Stats & Information Network		Musburger Media		2017							
Sports	World Fishing Network		Keywest Marketing (80.1%)/Altitude Sports and Entertainment (19.9%)		2007	-	-	Yes	-	-		
Sports	Yahoo Sports Network		Yahoo		2025							
Premium	MGM+		Amazon MGM Studios		2009	-	Yes			-		Formerly Epix
Premium	MGM+ Hits		Amazon MGM Studios		2010	-	Yes			-		Formerly Epix 2
Premium	MGM+ Drive-in		Amazon MGM Studios		2011	-	Yes	-	Yes	-		Launched as The 3 from Epix, formerly Epix Drive-in
Premium	MGM+ Marquee		Amazon MGM Studios		2012	-	Yes			-		Launched as Epix 3, formerly Epix Hits
Premium	ScreenPix		Amazon MGM Studios		2019	-	-	Yes	-	-		
Premium	ScreenPix Action		Amazon MGM Studios		2019	-	-	Yes	-	-		
Premium	ScreenPix Westerns		Amazon MGM Studios		2019	-	-	-	-	-		
Premium	ScreenPix Voices		Amazon MGM Studios		2019	-	-	Yes	-	-		
Premium	HBO		Skydance	Home Box Office, Inc.	1972	-	Yes			-	38,700,000	
Premium	HBO Hits		Skydance	Home Box Office, Inc.	1991	-	Yes			-		Formerly known as HBO2, HBO Plus
Premium	HBO Comedy		Skydance	Home Box Office, Inc.	1999	-	Yes			-		
Premium	HBO Drama		Skydance	Home Box Office, Inc.	1991	-	Yes			-		Formerly known as HBO Signature, HBO 3
Premium	HBO Movies		Skydance	Home Box Office, Inc.	1999	-	Yes			-		Formerly knowna as HBO Zone
Premium	Cinemax		Skydance	Home Box Office, Inc.	1980	-	Yes			-		
Premium	Cinemax Action		Skydance	Home Box Office, Inc.	1995	-	Yes			-		Launched as Cinemax 3, then ActionMax
Premium	Cinemax Hits		Skydance	Home Box Office, Inc.	1991	-	Yes			-		Launched as Cinemax 2, then MoreMax
Premium	Cinemax Classics		Skydance	Home Box Office, Inc.	2001	-	Yes			-		Formerly 5StarMax
Premium	Flix		Skydance	Showtime Networks	1992	-	Yes			Yes	-	
Premium	Showtime		Skydance	Showtime Networks	1976	-	Yes			Yes		
Premium	Showtime 2		Skydance	Showtime Networks	1991	-	Yes					Formerly known as Showtime Too
Premium	SHO×BET		Skydance	Showtime Networks	1999	-	Yes					Launched as Showtime Beyond
Premium	Showtime Extreme		Skydance	Showtime Networks	1998	-						
Premium	Showtime Family Zone		Skydance	Showtime Networks	2001	-	Yes	-				
Premium	Showtime Next		Skydance	Showtime Networks	2001	-	Yes	-				
Premium	Showtime Showcase		Skydance	Showtime Networks	2001	-	Yes	Yes				
Premium	Showtime Women		Skydance	Showtime Networks	2001	-	Yes	-				
Premium	The Movie Channel		Skydance	Showtime Networks	1973	-	Yes	Yes				Launched as Warner Star Channel, and later known as Star Channel
Premium	The Movie Channel Xtra		Skydance	Showtime Networks	1997	-	Yes					Launched as The Movie Channel 2
Premium	Starz		Starz Entertainment	Starz Inc.	1994	-	Yes					
Premium	Starz Cinema		Starz Entertainment	Starz Inc.	1999	-	Yes					
Premium	Starz Comedy		Starz Entertainment	Starz Inc.	2005	-	Yes					
Premium	Starz Edge		Starz Entertainment	Starz Inc.	1996	-	Yes					Formerly known as Starz 2 and Starz Theater
Premium	Starz in Black		Starz Entertainment	Starz Inc.	1997	-	Yes					Formerly known as BET Movies: Starz and Black Starz
Premium	Starz Kids & Family		Starz Entertainment	Starz Inc.	1999	-	Yes					Formed from the merger of Starz Kids and Starz Family
Premium	Starz Encore		Starz Entertainment	Starz Inc.	1991	-	Yes					Launched as Encore
Premium	Starz Encore Action		Starz Entertainment	Starz Inc.	1994	-	Yes					Formerly known as Action and Encore Action
Premium	Starz Encore Black		Starz Entertainment	Starz Inc.	2005	-	Yes	-	Yes	-		Formerly known as True Stories & Drama, True Stories, Encore Drama and Encore Black
Premium	Starz Encore Classic		Starz Entertainment	Starz Inc.	2013	-	Yes	-	Yes	-		Formerly known as Love Stories, Encore Love and Encore Classic
Premium	Starz Encore Family		Starz Entertainment	Starz Inc.	1994	-	Yes	-	Yes	-		Formerly known as WAM!, Encore Wam and Encore Family
Premium	Starz Encore Suspense		Starz Entertainment	Starz Inc.	1994	-	Yes			-		Formerly known as Mystery, Encore Mystery and Encore Suspense
Premium	Starz Encore Westerns		Starz Entertainment	Starz Inc.	1994	-	Yes			-		Formerly known as Westerns and Encore Westerns
Premium	IndiePlex		Starz Entertainment	Starz Inc.	2006	-	Yes			-		
Premium	MoviePlex		Starz Entertainment	Starz Inc.	1997	-	Yes			-		Formerly Plex
Premium	RetroPlex		Starz Entertainment	Starz Inc.	2006	-	Yes			-		
Shopping	America's Auction Channel		Jeremiah Hartman		2002		-	-		-	-	
Shopping	Gem Shopping Network		Gem Shopping Network		1997		-	-		-	-	
Shopping	HSN		Qurate Retail Group		1982		-	Yes		-	-	Launched as Home Shopping Club
Shopping	HSN2		Qurate Retail Group		2010		-	-		-	-	
Shopping	In The Kitchen		Qurate Retail Group		2019			Yes				Formerly known as Beauty iQ and QVC Now
Shopping	Jewelry Television		Multimedia Commerce Group		1993		-	-		-		Launched as America's Collectibles Network
Shopping	OnTV4U		Cannella Media		2006	Yes						
Shopping	QVC		Qurate Retail Group		1986		-	-		Yes	68,204,000	
Shopping	QVC2		Qurate Retail Group		2013		-	-		-	36,704,000	Launched as QVC Plus
Shopping	QVC3		Qurate Retail Group		2016		-	-		-	5,920,000	Launched as Beauty iQ
Shopping	QVC 365		Qurate Retail Group		2025							
Shopping	Shop LC		Vaibhav Global		2007	-	Yes	-	-	Yes	9,472,000	Formerly known as The Jewelry Channel and Liquidation Channel
Faith	3ABN		Three Angels Broadcasting Network		1986	-	Yes	-	-	Yes	-	Christian programming on flagship network
Faith	3ABN International		Three Angels Broadcasting Network		2000	-	Yes	-	-	-	-	Programming as seen on 3ABN including other programming produced by 3ABN Australia
Faith	3ABN Praise Him Music Network		Three Angels Broadcasting Network		2019	-	-	-	-			Christian music videos and programming
Faith	3ABN Proclaim!		Three Angels Broadcasting Network		2010	Yes	-	-	-		15,392,000	Educational programming
Faith	Believer's Voice of Victory Network		Kenneth Copeland Ministries		2015	-	-	-	-	-		
Faith	BYU TV		Brigham Young University		2000	-	-	Yes	-	-		Aimed at Latter-day Saint audience
Faith	Catholic Faith Network		Roman Catholic Diocese of Rockville Centre		2018	-	-	-	-	-		Launched as known as Telecare
Faith	CatholicTV		iCatholic Media		1955	-	-	-	-	-		24/7 faith-based entertainment
Faith	CBN News Channel		Christian Broadcasting Network		2020	Yes						
Faith	Christian Television Network		Christian Television Network		1979	Yes	-	-	-	-	5,780,000	
Faith	Dare to Dream Network		Three Angels Broadcasting Network		2011	Yes	-	-	-	-		Christian programming for African-American viewers
Faith	Daystar Television Network		Word of God Fellowship		1993	-	-	Yes	-	-		
Faith	EWTN		Eternal Word Television Network		1981	Yes	-	Yes	-	-	10,928,781	Aimed at Catholic viewers
Faith	Family Broadcasting Corporation		Family Broadcasting Corporation		1972	Yes		Yes				
Faith	Fox Soul		Fox Corporation		2020	Yes						
Faith	GEB Network		Oral Roberts University		1996	-	-	-	-	-		
Faith	GOD TV		The Angel Foundation		1995	Yes	-	-	-	-	5,780,000	Worldwide broadcast licence is held by Angel Christian Television Trust Inc.
Faith	God's Learning Channel		Prime Time Christian Broadcasting		1982	-	-	-	-	-		
Faith	Hope Channel		Seventh-day Adventist Church		2003	Yes	-	-	-	-	21,058,587	-
Faith	Jewish Broadcasting Service		Mark S. Golub		2006	-	-	Yes	-	-		
Faith	Jewish Life Television		Jewish Life Television		2007	-	-	-	-	-		
Faith	LoveWorld TV		Believers Love World Inc		2017	-	-	-	-	-		
Faith	NRB TV		National Religious Broadcasters		2005	-	-	-	-	-		
Faith	Positiv		Trinity Broadcasting Network		2002	Yes	-	-	-	-		Formerly known as JCTV and JUCE TV.
Faith	Scientology Network		Church of Scientology		2018	-	-	Yes	-	-		
Faith	Sonlife Broadcasting Network (SBN)		Jimmy Swaggart Ministries		2010	-	-	Yes	-	Yes		
Faith	The Family Channel		Get After It Media		2008	-	-	Yes	Yes	-	-	
Faith	The Walk TV		TW Broadcasting, LLC		2010	Yes						
Faith	TBN		Trinity Broadcasting Network		1973	Yes	-	-	-	47,360,000		
Faith	TBN Inspire		Trinity Broadcasting Network		2002	Yes	Yes	-	-	-		Formerly The Church Channel (2002–2016) and Hillsong Channel (2016–2021)
Faith	TCT		Tri-State Christian Television		1977	Yes	-	-	-	-	27,992,924	
Faith	The Word Network		Adell Broadcasting Corporation		2000	-	-	-	-	-	1,734,000	
Faith	Total Living Network		TLN Media		1998	Yes						
Faith	Gospel Broadcasting Network		Southaven Church of Christ		2005	Yes						
Faith	Loma Linda Broadcasting Network		Loma Linda Broadcasting Network Inc		1996	Yes						
Faith	Amazing Facts		Joe Crews		1965	Yes						
Faith	Uplifting Entertainment		Pastor Greg Robbins		1999	-	-	-	-	-		
Adult	Playboy TV		Aylo		2007	-	-	-	-	-		PPV, three multiplex channels
Adult	Hustler TV		Pramer International Group		1995	-	-	-	Yes	-		
Adult	Penthouse TV		Penthouse Media		2007	-	-	-	Yes	-		
Adult	Spice Networks		Aylo		1994	-	-	-	Yes	-	-	
Adult	The Erotic Network		New Frontier Media		2007	-	-	-	-	-		
Pay-Per-View	DirecTV Cinema		DirecTV		1994	-	Yes			-		Formerly Direct Ticket, Blockbuster Ticket, Blockbuster Pay-Per-View Movies, and DirecTV Pay-Per-View

=== Spanish language ===
Genre	Name	Logo	Owner (Subsidiary)	Launch Date	OTA	East/West	HD	VOD	SAP	Households	Notes
Variety	Aplauso		Olympusat, Inc.	2019							
Variety	Atreseries		Atresmedia	2015	-	-	Yes	-	-		
Variety	Canal 6		Grupo Multimedios	1968	-	-	Yes	-	-		
Variety	Canal SUR		SUR, LLC	1992	-	-	Yes	-	-		
Variety	El Salvador 24		Hemisphere Media Group	2024	-	-	-	-	-		
Variety	Emoción Atres		Atresmedia Internacional	2024							
Variety	Estrella TV		Estrella Media (Liberman Broadcasting)	2009	Yes	-	Yes			Spanish commercial	
Variety	Estrella Clásico		Estrella TV	2021							
Variety	Estrella Games		Estrella TV	2021							
Variety	Galavisión		TelevisaUnivision	1979	-	Yes			-		
Variety	HTV		Skydance	1995	-	-	Yes	-	-		
Variety	La 1		Radiotelevisión Española	1956			Yes				
Variety	La 2		Radiotelevisión Española	1966			Yes				
Variety	Multimedios Televisión		Grupo Multimedios	1968	Yes	-	Yes	-	-	6,942,039	Spanish commercial
Variety	Universo		NBCUniversal (NBCUniversal Telemundo Enterprises)	1993	-	Yes				42,378,000	Launched as mun2, and later known as NBC Universo
Variety	SUR Perú		SUR, LLC	2005	-	-	-	-	-		
Variety	TDV		Vme Media	2007							
Variety	TeleCentro		Albavisión	2008							
Variety	TeleHit Música		TelevisaUnivision	2006	-	-	-	-	-		
Variety	Telemicro Internacional		Hemisphere Media Group	2016							
Variety	Televisión Dominicana		Hemisphere Media Group	2000							
Variety	Única TV		Atresmedia Internacional	2024							
Variety	UniMás		TelevisaUnivision	2002	Yes				-	59,600,000	Spanish commercial. Launched as TeleFutura
Variety	Univision		TelevisaUnivision	1962	Yes				-	94,100,000	Spanish commercial. Launched as Spanish International Network
Variety	V-me		V-me Media	2007			Yes				
Variety	WAPA América		Hemisphere Media Group (WAPA Media Group)	2004							
Variety	WAPA+		Hemisphere Media Group (WAPA Media Group)	2024	-	-	-	-	-		
Lifestyle	Ingles Para Todos		2042 Media	2018			Yes				
Lifestyle	Hogar de HGTV		Skydance	2020	-	-	Yes	-	-		An American-Spanish version of HGTV and Food Network
Factual	Discovery en Español		Skydance	1998	-	-	Yes	-	-	6,278,000	
Factual	History en Español		Hearst Communications(A+E Global Media)	2004	-	-	Yes	-	-		
Factual	HITN		Hispanic Information and Telecommunications Network Inc.	1981	-	-	-	-	-		
Factual	Nat Geo Mundo		The Walt Disney Company (Walt Disney Television) (73%)/National Geographic Society (27%)	2011	-	-	-	-	-		
Factual	Zona Investigación TV		Atresmedia Internacional	2024	-	-	-	-	-		
Scripted	Novelisima		Cisneros Media	2021	-	-	-	-	-		
Scripted	TeleHit		TelevisaUnivision	1993	-	-	-	-	-		
Scripted	Telemundo		NBCUniversal (NBCUniversal Telemundo Enterprises)	1984	Yes				-	92,476,422	Spanish commercial. Launched as NetSpan
Scripted	Todo Novelas Más Pasiones		Hemisphere Media Group	2026	-	-	-	-	-		
Scripted	Univision tlnovelas		TelevisaUnivision	2012	-	-	Yes	-	-		
Movies	Atrescine		Atresmedia	2018			Yes				
Movies	Cine Estelar		Carlos Vasallo	2012			Yes				
Movies	Cine Estrella TV		Estrella TV	2021			Yes				
Movies	Cine Mexicano		Olympusat, Inc.	2004	-	-	Yes	-	-		
Movies	Cine Nostalgia		Carlos Vasallo	2011			Yes				
Movies	Cinema Dinamita		América Móvil	2013			Yes				
Movies	Nuestra Visión		América Móvil	2017							
Movies	Sony Cine		Sony Pictures Television	2012	-	-	Yes	-	-		An American-Spanish language version of Sony Movie Channel
Movies	Cinelatino		MVS Comunicaciones	1993	-	-	-	-	-		
Movies	Cine y Series TV		Atresmedia Internacional	2024							
Movies	De Película		TelevisaUnivision	1991	-	-	-	-	-		
Movies	De Película Clásico		TelevisaUnivision	1991	-	-	-	-	-		
Movies	Gran Cine		Olympusat, Inc.	1996	-	-	Yes	-	-		
Movies	TeleXitos		NBCUniversal (NBCUniversal Telemundo Enterprises)	2012	Yes	-	-	-	-	32,661,468	Spanish commercial
Movies	Todo Cine		Hemisphere Media Group	2023	-	-	-	-	-		
Movies	ViendoMovies		SomosTV	2006	-	-	Yes	-	-		
Music	MTV Tres		Paramount Skydance (Paramount Media Networks)	1998	-	Yes	-	Yes	-		Launched as MTV en Español.
Music	Tarima		SPLEX One	2013	-	-	Yes	-	-		
Children's and Family	Always Funny en Español			2024							
Children's and Family	Clan		Radiotelevisión Española	2005	-	-	Yes	-	-		
Children's and Family	Discovery Familia		Skydance (60%)/Hasbro (40%)	2007	-	-	Yes	-	-	5,515,000	Launched as Discovery Kids en Español
Children's and Family	Semillitas		SomosTV	2007			Yes				
Children's and Family	Vme Kids		V-me Media	2010			Yes				
Children's and Family	Kids Street		2042 Media USA, LLC	2017	Yes						
News	24 Horas		Radiotelevisión Española	1997			Yes				
News	CNN en Español		Skydance (CNN Global)	1997	-	-	Yes	-			
News	Milenio Televisión		Grupo Multimedios	2008			Yes				
News	N+ Foro		TelevisaUnivision	2010	-	-	Yes	-	-		
News	Comercio		-	-	-	-	-	-	-		
News	Meganoticias MX		Megacable	1990	-	-	-	-	-		
News	Newsmax en Español		Newsmax Media	2024	-	-	-	-	-		
News	Estrella News		Estrella TV	2021							
News	TeleFórmula		Radio Fórmula	2000	-	-	-	-	-		
Sports	BeIN Sports en Español		beIN Media Group	2012	-	-	Yes	-	-		
Sports	BeIN Sports Xtra ñ		beIN Media Group	2019	-	-	-	-	-		
Sports	ESPN Deportes		ESPN Inc.	2004	-	-	Yes		-		Spanish-language sports network
Sports	Fox Deportes		Fox Corporation	2010	-	-	Yes		-	21,282,000	Formerly known as Fox Sports en Español until 2010
Sports	Real Madrid TV		Real Madrid CF	1999			Yes				
Sports	Teledeporte		Radiotelevisión Española	1994			Yes				
Sports	TUDN		TelevisaUnivision	2012	-	-	Yes	-			Launched as Univision Deportes Network
Sports	TyC Sports		Torneos y Competencias/Clarín Group	1994	-	-	Yes	-	-		
Sports	WAPA Deportes		Hemisphere Media Group (WAPA Media Group)	2004	-	-	-	-	-		
Sports	Zona TUDN		TelevisaUnivision	2022	-	-	Yes	-	-		
Premium	HBO Latino		Skydance (Home Box Office, Inc.)	2000	-	Yes			-		
Premium	Cinemáx		Skydance (Home Box Office, Inc.)	2001	-	Yes			-		Formerly known as @Max and MaxLatino
Premium	Starz Encore Español		Lionsgate (Starz Inc.)	2013	-	Yes	-	Yes	-		Launched as Encore Español
Premium	Ultra Banda		Olympusat, Inc.	2012	-	-	Yes (Ultra HD)	-	-		
Premium	Ultra Cine		Olympusat, Inc.	2012	-	-	Yes (Ultra HD)	-	-	-	
Premium	Ultra Clasico		Olympusat, Inc.	2012	-	-	Yes (Ultra HD)	-	-	-	
Premium	Ultra Docu		Olympusat, Inc.	2012	-	-	Yes (Ultra HD)	-	-	-	
Premium	Ultra Familia		Olympusat, Inc.	2012	-	-	Yes (Ultra HD)	-	-	-	
Premium	Ultra Fiesta		Olympusat, Inc.	2012	-	-	Yes (Ultra HD)	-	-	-	
Premium	Ultra Film		Olympusat, Inc.	2012	-	-	Yes (Ultra HD)	-	-	-	
Premium	Ultra Kidz		Olympusat, Inc.	2012	-	-	Yes (Ultra HD)	-	-	-	
Premium	Ultra Luna		Olympusat, Inc.	2012	-	-	Yes (Ultra HD)	-	-	-	
Premium	Ultra Macho		Olympusat, Inc.	2012	-	-	Yes (Ultra HD)	-	-	-	
Premium	Ultra Mex		Olympusat, Inc.	2012	-	-	Yes (Ultra HD)	-	-	-	
Premium	Ultratainment		Olympusat, Inc.	2012	-	-	Yes (Ultra HD)	-	-	-	
Faith	Almavision		Almavision Hispanic Network	2002	-	-	-	-	-		
Faith	3ABN Latino		Three Angels Broadcasting Network	2003	Yes	-	-	-	-	23,680,000	Bilingual Spanish and Portuguese television channel based in West Frankfort, Illinois
Faith	Daystar Español		Word of God Fellowship	2025			Yes				
Faith	EJTV		Enlace	2000			Yes				
Faith	Enlace		Trinity Broadcasting Network	1988	Yes	-	Yes	-	-		
Faith	ESNE TV		El Sembrador Ministries	2002							
Faith	Esperanza TV		Seventh-day Adventist Church	2003	-	-	-	-	-		
Faith	EWTN Español		Eternal Word Television Network	1992	-	-	-	-	-		
Faith	Maríavisión			1993							Formerly known as Claravisión
Faith	Visión Latina		Universal Church of the Kingdom of God	2022							
Faith	Tele Vida Abundante		Centro Cristiano Vida Abundante, Inc.	1985	-	-	-	-	-		
International	¡Sorpresa!		Olympusat, Inc.	2003	-	-	Yes	-	-		
International	Antena 3 Internacional		Atresmedia	1995	-	-	Yes	-	-		Spanish TV channel from Spain (Europe)
International	Bandamax		TelevisaUnivision	1996	-	-	Yes	-	-		
International	Beat Box		Megacable	2016	-	-	Yes	-	-		
International	Canal 22 Internacional		Secretariat of Culture	-	-	-	-	Yes	-		
International	Canal Once		Instituto Politécnico Nacional	1959	-	-	-	-	-		Spanish commercial
International	Canal Sur Internacional		Canal Sur	1998			Yes				
International	Caracol Internacional		Julio Mario Santo Domingo	1998	-	-	-	-	-		
International	Centroamérica TV		Hemisphere Media Group	2004	-	-	-	-	-		
International	Cinema Platino		Megacable	1997	-	-	Yes	-	-		
International	Cinema		TV Azteca	2015	-	-	Yes	-	-		
International	Corazón		TV Azteca	2008	-	-	Yes	-	-		
International	Clic		TV Azteca	2000	-	-	Yes	-	-		
International	CubaMAX		-	-	-	-	-			Available on Dish Network on channel 851	
International	CubaPlay+		Olympusat, Inc.	-	-	-	Yes	-	-		Available on VEMOX
International	Cubavisión International		ICRT	1986							
International	Ecuador TV Internacional		-	2007	-	-	-	-	-		Available on DirecTV on channel 457
International	Ecuavisa Internacional		-	-	-	-	-	-	-		
International	El Trece Internacional		Artear	2009			Yes				
International	¡Hola! TV		-	-	-	-	-	-	-		Available on DirecTV on channel 430
International	Las Estrellas Internacional		TelevisaUnivision	1988			Yes				
International	LATV		LATV Networks	2001	Yes	-	Yes	-	-	37,248,000	Bilingual (English/Spanish) entertainment
International	Mega TV		Spanish Broadcasting System	2006	Yes	-	Yes	Yes	-	6,984,000	Spanish commercial
International	Mega Sports		Megacable	2016	-	-	Yes	-	-		
International	Mexicanal		Castalia Communications & Cablecom	2005	-	-	-	-	-		Spanish commercial
International	NTN24		RCN Televisión	2008							
International	Pasiones		Hemisphere Media Group	2008	-	-	-	-	-		
International	Panico		Megacable	2011	-	-	Yes	-	-		
International	Perú Mágico		Movistar TV (Media Networks Latin America)	2004	-	-	-	-	-		
International	PX Sports		-	2011	-	-	-	-			
International	RCN Novelas		RCN Televisión	2009	-	-	-	-	-		
International	RCN Nuestra Tele		RCN Televisión	2003	-	-	-	-	-		Known as TV Colombia until October 8, 2012.
International	Super Canal		Supercanal, S.A.	2000			Yes				
International	Star TVE		Televisión Española	2015 (test); 2016 (regular)			Yes				
International	TC Internacional		CAEC Televisión; Comunica EP	2021	-	-	Yes	-	-		
International	TELE N		Olympusat, Inc.	-	-	-	Yes	-	-		Launched as Latele Novela.
International	Telefe Internacional		Telefe	1998	-	-	Yes	-	-		
International	Teleritmo		Grupo Multimedios	-	-	-	Yes	-	-		
International	Telesur		SiBCI	2005			Yes				
International	Todo Noticias		Clarín Group	1993			Yes				
International	TV Chile		Televisión Nacional de Chile	1989	-	-	Yes	-	-		
International	TV Venezuela		Globovisión/Canal Sur	2006	-	-	-	-	-		
International	TVC Deportes		Megacable	2007	-	-	Yes	-	-		
International	TVE Internacional		Televisión Española	1989	-	-	Yes	-	-		
International	VePlus		Cisneros Media	2000	-	-	-	-	-		Available in the United States, Latin America, Venezuela, Spain, and the Philippines
International	Video Rola		Megacable	1998							Formerly known as a programming block on Megacanal before expanding the block's hours to replace Megacanal
International	Video Rola Plus		Megacable	2014							Formerly known as an app
International	Win+ Fútbol		DirecTV; RCN Televisión	2019							
International	Zee Mundo		Zee Entertainment Enterprises	2016	-	-	Yes	-	-		
Promotions	Barker Channel		Megacable	-	-	-	-	-	-		
Adult	Playboy TV en Español		Aylo	1997	-	-	-	Yes	-		PPV

== Regional channels ==
The following channels are only available in certain regions as noted; they are all primarily broadcast in English.

Genre	Name	Location	Owner (Subsidiary)	Notes
News	News 12/ News 12+ Long Island	New York metropolitan area	Optimum Communications (Optimum News)	
News	News 12/ News 12+ New Jersey	New York metropolitan area	Optimum Communications (Optimum News)	
News	News 12/ News 12+ Westchester	New York metropolitan area	Optimum Communications (Optimum News)	
News	News 12/ News 12+ Connecticut	New York metropolitan area	Optimum Communications (Optimum News)	
News	News 12/ News 12+ The Bronx	New York metropolitan area	Optimum Communications (Optimum News)	
News	News 12/ News 12+ Brooklyn	New York metropolitan area	Optimum Communications (Optimum News)	
News	News 12/ News 12+ Hudson Valley	New York metropolitan area	Optimum Communications (Optimum News)	
News	WisconsinEye	Madison, Wisconsin	WisconsinEye Public Affairs Network	
News	Arizona Capitol Television	Phoenix, Arizona	Arizona State Legislature	Also called ACP
News	Cable 11 Northern Lancaster County	Eastern Pennsylvania	Blue Ridge Communications	
News	TV 13 The Poconos	Eastern Pennsylvania	Blue Ridge Communications	
News	Bay News 9	Tampa, Florida	Charter Communications	
News	News 13	Orlando, Florida	Charter Communications	Formerly Central Florida News 13
News	NY1	New York City	Charter Communications	
News	Spectrum News 1 Kansas City	Kansas City, Missouri	Charter Communications	Formerly Metro Sports, Time Warner Cable SportsChannel and Spectrum Sports (Kansas City)
News	Spectrum News 1 (Kentucky/Southwestern Ohio/Southern Indiana)	Louisville, Lexington, Paducah, and Owensboro, Kentucky, Evansville, Indiana, and Cincinnati, Ohio	Charter Communications	Formerly cn2
News	Spectrum News 1 (Massachusetts)	Pittsfield and Worcester, Massachusetts	Charter Communications	
News	Spectrum News 1 (Ohio)	Cleveland, Cincinnati, and Columbus, Ohio	Charter Communications	
News	Spectrum News 1 (Wisconsin)	Milwaukee, Madison, Green Bay and the Fox Cities, Wisconsin	Charter Communications	
News	Spectrum News 1 Austin	Austin, Texas	Charter Communications	Formerly known as News 8 Austin, YNN Austin, Time Warner Cable News Austin, and Spectrum News Austin
News	Spectrum News 1 Buffalo	Buffalo, New York	Charter Communications	Formerly known as YNN Buffalo, Time Warner Cable News Buffalo, and Spectrum News Buffalo
News	Spectrum News 1 Capital Region	Upstate New York	Charter Communications	Formerly known as Capital News 9, YNN Capital Region, Time Warner Cable News Capital Region, and Spectrum News Capital Region
News	Spectrum News 1 Central New York	Syracuse, New York	Charter Communications	Formerly known as News 10 Now, YNN Central New York, Time Warner Cable News Central New York, and Spectrum News Capital Region
News	Spectrum News 1 Dallas-Fort Worth	Dallas–Fort Worth metroplex	Charter Communications	
News	Spectrum News 1 North Carolina	Raleigh–Durham, Greensboro/Winston-Salem/High Point and Charlotte, North Carolina	Charter Communications	Formerly known as News 14 Carolina, Time Warner Cable News North Carolina, and Spectrum News North Carolina
News	Spectrum News 1 Rochester	Rochester, New York	Charter Communications	Original station of the Spectrum News 1 system; formerly known as WGRC-TV, GRC9News, R News, YNN Rochester, Time Warner Cable News Rochester, and Spectrum News Rochester
News	Pittsburgh Cable News Channel	Pittsburgh, Pennsylvania	Cox Media Group	Also known as PCNC; Uses resources from co-owned WPXI
News	News Channel Nebraska	Norfolk, South Sioux City, Columbus, Grand Island, Lincoln, Omaha and Beatrice, Nebraska	Flood Communications, LLC	
News	News 9 NowNews on 6 Now	Oklahoma City and Tulsa, Oklahoma	Griffin Communications	
News	New England Cable News	New England	NBCUniversal	Also known as NECN
News	WJLA 24/7 News	Washington, D.C. regional, Virginia and Maryland	Sinclair Broadcast Group	Formerly known as NewsChannel 8
News	Arizona NewsChannel	Phoenix, Arizona	Tegna	
News	Idaho's Very Own 24/7	Boise, Idaho	Tegna	
News	NewsWatch 15	New Orleans, Louisiana	Tegna/Cox Communications	
Sports	ABTV	Anaheim, California	Los Angeles Angels	
Sports	BravesVision	Alabama, Georgia, Mississippi, South Carolina, Tennessee, and western North Carolina	Atlanta Braves	Available on over-the-air affiliates
Sports	Mid-Atlantic Sports Network (MASN)		Baltimore Orioles/Washington Nationals	English and Spanish audio feed
Sports	Big Ten Network		Fox Corporation (Fox Sports Media Group)/Big Ten Conference	Big Ten Conference sports English and Spanish audio feed
Sports	NESN		Fenway Sports Group (80%)/Delaware North (20%)	
Sports	Spectrum OC16		Charter Communications	University of Hawaii Athletic programs
Sports	Spectrum SportsNet		Charter Communications	Formerly TWC SportsNet
Sports	Spectrum SportsNet LA		Charter Communications	
Sports	ACC Network		ESPN Inc.	
Sports	SEC Network		ESPN Inc.	
Sports	Altitude Sports and Entertainment		Kroenke Sports & Entertainment	Sports channel covering Denver sports teams
Sports	Marquee Sports Network	Chicago, Illinois	Sinclair Broadcast Group/Chicago Cubs	Covers Chicago Cubs games
Sports	MSG / MSG 2		MSG Entertainment	Formerly UA-Columbia/MSG and Madison Square Garden Network. English and Spanish audio feed
Sports	MSG Sportsnet / MSG Sportsnet 2 HD		MSG Entertainment	Formerly Cablevision Sports 3, SportsChannel New York, FSN New York and MSG Plus. English and Spanish audio feed
Sports	MSG Western New York		MSG Entertainment	Subfeed of MSG, programmed by Pegula Sports and Entertainment, formerly MSG Zone 3 or MSG Sabres. English and Spanish audio feed
Sports	NBC Sports Bay Area		Comcast (NBC Sports Regional Networks, NBC Sports Group, NBCUniversal)	formerly Pacific Sports Network, SportsChannel Bay Area, SportsChannel Pacific, FSN Bay Area and CSN Bay Area, sister channel of NBC Sports California
Sports	Monumental Sports Network		Comcast (NBC Sports Regional Networks, NBC Sports Group, NBCUniversal)	Formerly HTS: Home Team Sports, CSN Mid-Atlantic and NBC Sports Washington
Sports	NBC Sports Boston		Comcast (NBC Sports Regional Networks, NBC Sports Group, NBCUniversal)	Formerly PRISM New England, SportsChannel New England, FSN New England and CSN New England
Sports	NBC Sports Philadelphia		Comcast (NBC Sports Regional Networks, NBC Sports Group, NBCUniversal)	Formerly PRISM and CSN Philadelphia
Sports	NBC Sports California		Comcast (NBC Sports Regional Networks, NBC Sports Group, NBCUniversal)	Formerly CSN West, sister channel of NBC Sports Bay Area
Sports	SportsNet New York		Comcast (NBC Sports Regional Networks, NBC Sports Group, NBCUniversal)	New York Mets/Charter Communications/NBCUniversal. English and Spanish audio feed
Sports	Peachtree Sports Network		Gray Media	
Sports	Space City Home Network		Houston Astros (50%)/Houston Rockets (50%)	Formerly CSN Houston, Root Sports Southwest and AT&T SportsNet Southwest
Sports	SportsNet Pittsburgh		Fenway Sports Group	Formerly Pirates Cable Network, KBL Entertainment Network, Prime Sports KBL, FSN Pittsburgh, Root Sports Pittsburgh and AT&T SportsNet Pittsburgh
Sports	YES Network		Yankee Global Enterprises (26%)/Diamond Sports Group (20%)/Amazon (15%)/The Blackstone Group (13%)/Redbird Capital (13%)/Mubadala Investment Company (13%)	English and Spanish audio feed

== Distant locals ==
The following channels are distant locals, sold out-of-market to areas without a relevant affiliate. (O&O stations and major PBS member stations are bolded):

Affiliate	Call Sign	Logo	Location	Owner (Subsidiary or Operator)	Notes
ABC	**KABC-TV 7**		Los Angeles, California	The Walt Disney Company (ABC Owned Television Stations)	ABC West Coast flagship station
ABC	**KGO-TV 7**		San Francisco, California	The Walt Disney Company (ABC Owned Television Stations)	
ABC	**KFSN-TV 30**		Fresno, California	The Walt Disney Company (ABC Owned Television Stations)	
ABC	**KTRK-TV 13**		Houston, Texas	The Walt Disney Company (ABC Owned Television Stations)	
ABC	KMGH-TV 7		Denver, Colorado	E. W. Scripps Company	
ABC	KSTP-TV 5		Minneapolis–St. Paul, Minnesota	Hubbard Broadcasting	
ABC	**WABC-TV 7**		New York City, New York	The Walt Disney Company (ABC Owned Television Stations)	ABC network flagship station
ABC	WCVB-TV 5		Boston, Massachusetts	Hearst Communications (Hearst Television)	
ABC	WFAA 8		Dallas–Fort Worth, Texas	Tegna, Inc.	
ABC	WHAM-TV 13		Rochester, New York	Deerfield Media (Sinclair Broadcast Group)	
ABC	WHTM-TV 27		Harrisburg, Pennsylvania	Nexstar Media Group	
ABC	WJLA-TV 7		Washington, D.C.	Sinclair Broadcast Group	
ABC	WKBW-TV 7		Buffalo, New York	E. W. Scripps Company	
ABC	**WLS-TV 7**		Chicago, Illinois	The Walt Disney Company (ABC Owned Television Stations)	
ABC	**WTVD 11**		Raleigh, North Carolina	The Walt Disney Company (ABC Owned Television Stations)	
ABC	WMUR-TV 9		Manchester, New Hampshire	Hearst Communications (Hearst Television)	
ABC	WNEP-TV 16		Scranton, Pennsylvania	Tegna, Inc.	
ABC	**WPVI-TV 6**		Philadelphia, Pennsylvania	The Walt Disney Company (ABC Owned Television Stations)	
ABC	WSYX 6		Columbus, Ohio	Sinclair Broadcast Group	
ABC	WTAE-TV 4		Pittsburgh, Pennsylvania	Hearst Communications (Hearst Television)	
ABC	WXYZ-TV 7		Detroit, Michigan	E. W. Scripps Company	
CBS	**KCBS-TV 2**		Los Angeles, California	Skydance (CBS News and Stations)	CBS West Coast flagship station
CBS	**KCNC-TV 4**		Denver, Colorado	Skydance (CBS News and Stations)	
CBS	KCTV 5		Kansas City, Missouri	Gray Media	
CBS	**KDKA-TV 2**		Pittsburgh, Pennsylvania	Skydance (CBS News and Stations)	
CBS	KHOU 11		Houston, Texas	Tegna, Inc.	
CBS	**KOVR 13**		Sacramento, California	Skydance (CBS News and Stations)	
CBS	**KPIX-TV 5**		San Francisco, California	Skydance (CBS News and Stations)	
CBS	**KTVT 11**		Dallas–Fort Worth, Texas	Skydance (CBS News and Stations)	
CBS	**KYW-TV 3**		Philadelphia, Pennsylvania	Skydance (CBS News and Stations)	
CBS	**WBBM-TV 2**		Chicago, Illinois	Skydance (CBS News and Stations)	
CBS	WBTV 3		Charlotte, North Carolina	Gray Media	
CBS	**WBZ-TV 4**		Boston, Massachusetts	Skydance (CBS News and Stations)	
CBS	**WCBS-TV 2**		New York City, New York	Skydance (CBS News and Stations)	CBS network flagship station
CBS	**WCCO-TV 4**		Minneapolis–Saint Paul, Minnesota	Skydance (CBS News and Stations)	
CBS	WHP-TV 21		Harrisburg, Pennsylvania	Sinclair Broadcast Group	
CBS	WRGB 6		Schenectady–Albany, New York	Sinclair Broadcast Group	One of the first American television stations
CBS	WROC-TV 8		Rochester, New York	Nexstar Media Group	
CBS	WUSA 9		Washington, D.C.	Tegna, Inc.	
CBS	**WJZ-TV 13**		Baltimore, Maryland	Skydance (CBS News and Stations)	
CBS	**WFOR-TV 4**		Miami, Florida	Skydance (CBS News and Stations)	
CBS	**WUPA 69**		Atlanta, Georgia	Skydance (CBS News and Stations)	
CBS	**WWJ-TV 62**		Detroit, Michigan	Skydance (CBS News and Stations)	
CBS	WYOU 22		Scranton, Pennsylvania	Mission Broadcasting (Nexstar Media Group)	
The CW	**KRON-TV 4**		San Francisco, California	Nexstar Media Group (Nexstar Broadcasting)	
The CW	**KTLA 5**		Los Angeles, California	Nexstar Media Group (Nexstar Broadcasting)	CW West Coast flagship station
The CW	**KWGN-TV 2**		Denver, Colorado	Nexstar Media Group (Nexstar Broadcasting)	
The CW	**KAUT-TV 43**		Oklahoma City, Oklahoma	Nexstar Media Group (Nexstar Broadcasting)	
The CW	**WGN-TV 9**		Chicago, Illinois	Nexstar Media Group (Nexstar Broadcasting)	Superstation feed for markets without an independent station; also distributed in Canada
The CW	**WDCW 50**		Washington, D.C.	Nexstar Media Group (Nexstar Broadcasting)	
The CW	WBFS-TV 33		Miami–Fort Lauderdale, Florida	Skydance (CBS News and Stations)	
The CW	WKBD-TV 50		Detroit, Michigan	Skydance (CBS News and Stations)	
The CW	WLVI 56		Boston, Massachusetts	Sunbeam Television	
The CW	WNUV 54		Baltimore, Maryland	Cunningham Broadcasting (Sinclair Broadcast Group)	
The CW	**WPIX 11**		New York City, New York	Mission Broadcasting (Nexstar Media Group)	CW flagship station
The CW	**WPHL 17**		Philadelphia, Pennsylvania	Nexstar Media Group (Tribune Media Company)	
The CW	WSWB 38		Scranton, Pennsylvania	Sinclair Broadcast Group	
The CW	WCWN 15		Schenectady–Albany–Troy, New York	Sinclair Broadcast Group	
The CW	WUCW 23		Minneapolis-St. Paul, Minnesota	Sinclair Broadcast Group	
Fox	**KCPQ 13**		Seattle, Washington	Fox Corporation (Fox Television Stations)	
Fox	**KDFW-TV 4**		Dallas–Fort Worth, Texas	Fox Corporation (Fox Television Stations)	
Fox	KDVR 31		Denver, Colorado	Nexstar Media Group (Nexstar Broadcasting)	
Fox	**KMSP-TV 9**		Minneapolis-St. Paul, Minnesota	Fox Corporation (Fox Television Stations)	
Fox	**KRIV 26**		Houston, Texas	Fox Corporation (Fox Television Stations)	
Fox	**KSAZ-TV 10**		Phoenix, Arizona	Fox Corporation (Fox Television Stations)	
Fox	**KTBC 7**		Austin, Texas	Fox Corporation (Fox Television Stations)	
Fox	**KTTV 11**		Los Angeles, California	Fox Corporation (Fox Television Stations)	Fox West Coast flagship station
Fox	**KTVU 2**		Oakland–San Francisco, California	Fox Corporation (Fox Television Stations)	
Fox	**WAGA-TV 5**		Atlanta, Georgia	Fox Corporation (Fox Television Stations)	
Fox	WBFF 45		Baltimore, Maryland	Sinclair Broadcast Group	
Fox	**WFLD 32**		Chicago, Illinois	Fox Corporation (Fox Television Stations)	
Fox	WFXT 25		Boston, Massachusetts	Cox Media Group	
Fox	**WITI 6**		Milwaukee, Wisconsin	Fox Corporation (Fox Television Stations)	
Fox	**WJBK 2**		Detroit, Michigan	Fox Corporation (Fox Television Stations)	
Fox	**WNYW 5**		New York City, New York	Fox Corporation (Fox Television Stations)	Fox network flagship station
Fox	**WOFL 35**		Orlando–Daytona Beach–Melbourne, Florida	Fox Corporation (Fox Television Stations)	
Fox	WOGX 51		Ocala–Gainesville, Florida	Fox Corporation (Fox Television Stations)	Semi-satellite of WOFL, Orlando, Florida
Fox	WOLF-TV 56		Hazleton, Pennsylvania	Sinclair Broadcast Group	
Fox	WPMT 43		York, Pennsylvania	Tegna, Inc.	
Fox	**WTTG 5**		Washington, D.C.	Fox Corporation (Fox Television Stations)	
Fox	**WTVT 13**		Tampa–St. Petersburg, Florida	Fox Corporation (Fox Television Stations)	
Fox	**WTXF-TV 29**		Philadelphia, Pennsylvania	Fox Corporation (Fox Television Stations)	
Fox	WUHF 31		Rochester, New York	Sinclair Broadcast Group	
Independent	**KCAL-TV 9**		Los Angeles, California	Paramount Skydance (CBS News and Stations)	
Independent	**KPYX 44'**		San Francisco, California	Paramount Skydance (CBS News and Stations)	
Independent	**KMAX 31**		Sacramento–Stockton–Modesto, California	Paramount Skydance (CBS News and Stations)	
Independent	KMTP-TV 32	-	San Francisco, California	Minority Television Project	Non-commercial independent
Independent	KTSF 26		San Francisco, California	Lincoln Broadcasting Company	Multicultural independent
Independent	**KSTW 11**		Seattle, Washington	Paramount Skydance (CBS News and Stations)	
Independent	**KTXA 21**		Fort Worth–Dallas, Texas	Paramount Skydance (CBS News and Stations)	
Independent	KUEN 9		Salt Lake City, Utah	Utah State Board of Regents	Educational independent
Independent	WMYD 20		Detroit, Michigan	E. W. Scripps Company	
Independent	WBPH-TV 60		Bethlehem, Pennsylvania	Sonshine Family Television, Inc.	Religious independent
Independent	WDVM-TV 25		Hagerstown, Maryland	Nexstar Media Group	
Independent	WEFS 68	-	Cocoa Beach, Florida	Eastern Florida State College	Educational independent
Independent	WFMZ-TV 69		Allentown, Pennsylvania	Maranatha Broadcasting Company, Inc.	
Independent	**WSBK-TV 38**		Boston, Massachusetts	Paramount Skydance (CBS News and Stations)	
Independent	WCIU-TV 26		Chicago, Illinois	Weigel Broadcasting	
Independent	WMEU-CD 48		Chicago, Illinois	Weigel Broadcasting	
Independent	WHDH 7		Boston, Massachusetts	Sunbeam Television	
Independent	**WLNY-TV 55**		Riverhead, New York	Paramount Skydance (CBS News and Stations)	
Independent	**WPSG 57**		Philadelphia, Pennsylvania	Paramount Skydance (CBS News and Stations)	
Independent	WLYH 49		Red Lion, Pennsylvania	Sonshine Family Television, Inc.	Religious independent
Independent	WNYE-TV 25		New York City, New York	NYC Media (New York City Department of Information Technology & Telecommunications)	Educational independent
Independent	WPCH-TV 17		Atlanta, Georgia	Gray Media	Operated (as WTCG/WTBS) as the originating feed of TBS from December 1976 to September 2007
Independent	**WPKD-TV 19**		Pittsburgh, Pennsylvania	Paramount Skydance (CBS News and Stations)	
Independent	**WTOG 44**		St. Petersburg–Tampa, Florida	Paramount Skydance (CBS News and Stations)	
Independent	WTVE 51		Reading, Pennsylvania	WRNN-TV Associates (WRNN License Company, LLC)	
MeTV	WDPN-TV 2		Philadelphia, Pennsylvania	Maranatha Broadcasting Company Inc.	
MeTV	WJLP 3		Middletown Township, New Jersey	Weigel Broadcasting Company	
MyNetworkTV	**KCOP-TV 13**		Los Angeles, California	Fox Corporation (Fox Television Stations)	MyNetworkTV West Coast flagship station
MyNetworkTV	**KDFI 27**		Dallas–Fort Worth, Texas	Fox Corporation (Fox Television Stations)	
MyNetworkTV	**KICU-TV 36**		San Jose, California	Fox Corporation (Fox Television Stations)	
MyNetworkTV	**KTXH 20**		Houston, Texas	Fox Corporation (Fox Television Stations)	
MyNetworkTV	**KUTP 45**		Phoenix, Arizona	Fox Corporation (Fox Television Stations)	
MyNetworkTV	**KZJO 22**		Tacoma - Seattle, Washington	Fox Corporation (Fox Television Stations)	
MyNetworkTV	**WDCA 20**		Washington, D.C.	Fox Corporation (Fox Television Stations)	
MyNetworkTV	**WFTC 29**		Minneapolis–St. Paul, Minnesota	Fox Corporation (Fox Television Stations)	
MyNetworkTV	WADL 38		Detroit, Michigan	Adell Broadcasting Corporation	
MyNetworkTV	**WPWR-TV 50**		Chicago, Illinois	Fox Corporation (Fox Television Stations)	
MyNetworkTV	WBFF 45.2		Baltimore, Maryland	Sinclair Broadcast Group	
MyNetworkTV	**WRBW 65**		Orlando–Daytona Beach, Florida	Fox Corporation (Fox Television Stations)	
MyNetworkTV	WSNN-LD		Sarasota, Florida	Nexstar Media Group	
MyNetworkTV	**WWOR-TV 9**		Secaucus, New Jersey–New York City, New York	Fox Corporation (Fox Television Stations)	MyNetworkTV flagship station
NBC	KARE 11		Minneapolis–St. Paul, Minnesota	Tegna, Inc.	
NBC	KFOR-TV 4		Oklahoma City, Oklahoma	Nexstar Media Group	
NBC	**KNBC 4**		Los Angeles, California	Comcast (NBC Owned Television Stations)	NBC West Coast flagship station
NBC	**KNSD 39**		San Diego, California	Comcast (NBC Owned Television Stations)	
NBC	**KNTV 11**		San Jose–San Francisco, California	Comcast (NBC Owned Television Stations)	
NBC	KING-TV 5		Seattle, Washington	Tegna, Inc.	
NBC	KSDK 5		St. Louis, Missouri	Tegna, Inc.	
NBC	KSHB-TV 41		Kansas City, Missouri	E. W. Scripps Company	
NBC	KTVB 7		Boise, Idaho	Tegna, Inc.	
NBC	KUSA 9		Denver, Colorado	Tegna, Inc.	
NBC	**KXAS-TV 5**		Fort Worth–Dallas, Texas	Comcast (NBC Owned Television Stations)	
NBC	WBRE-TV 28		Wilkes–Barre, Pennsylvania	Nexstar Media Group (Nexstar Broadcasting)	
NBC	**WBTS-CD 15**		Boston, Massachusetts	Comcast (NBC Owned Television Stations)	
NBC	**WCAU 10**		Philadelphia, Pennsylvania	Comcast (NBC Owned Television Stations)	
NBC	WDIV-TV 4		Detroit, Michigan	Graham Media Group	
NBC	WFLA-TV 8		Tampa–St. Petersburg, Florida	Nexstar Media Group	
NBC	WGAL 8		Lancaster, Pennsylvania	Hearst Communications (Hearst Television)	
NBC	WHEC-TV 10		Rochester, New York	Hubbard Broadcasting	
NBC	WKYC 3		Cleveland, Ohio	Tegna, Inc.	
NBC	**WMAQ-TV 5**		Chicago, Illinois	Comcast (NBC Owned Television Stations)	
NBC	**WNBC 4**		New York City, New York	Comcast (NBC Owned Television Stations)	NBC network flagship station; one of the first American television stations
NBC	WPXI 11		Pittsburgh, Pennsylvania	Cox Media Group	
NBC	**WRC-TV 4**		Washington, D.C.	Comcast (NBC Owned Television Stations)	
NBC	**WTVJ 6**		Miami–Fort Lauderdale, Florida	Comcast (NBC Owned Television Stations)	
NBC	**WVIT 30**		Hartford–New Haven, Connecticut	Comcast (NBC Owned Television Stations)	
PBS	**KCET 28**		Los Angeles, California	Public Media Group of Southern California	
PBS	**KOCE-TV 50**		Huntington Beach, California	Public Media Group of Southern California	
PBS	**KQED 9**		San Francisco, California	KQED Inc.	
PBS	**KQET 25**		Watsonville, California	KQED Inc.	satellite of KQED 9
PBS	**KQEH 54**		San Jose, California	KQED Inc.	
PBS	KUHT 8		Houston, Texas	University of Houston (University of Houston System)	
PBS	**NJ PBS**		Trenton, New Jersey	New Jersey Public Broadcasting Authority (operated by the WNET Group)	Statewide simulcast on four stations
PBS	WEDW 49		Bridgeport, Connecticut	Connecticut Public Broadcasting, Inc.	Flagship station of Connecticut Public Television
PBS	**WETA-TV 26**		Washington, D.C.	Greater Washington Educational Telecommunications Association	
PBS	**WGBH-TV 2**		Boston, Massachusetts	WGBH Educational Foundation	
PBS	**WHYY-TV 12**		Wilmington, Delaware–Philadelphia, Pennsylvania	WHYY, Inc.	
PBS	**WITF-TV 33**		Harrisburg, Pennsylvania	WITF Inc.	
PBS	WLIW 21		Garden City, New York	WNET Group	
PBS	**WLVT-TV 39**		Allentown, Pennsylvania	Lehigh Valley Public Telecommunications Corporation	
PBS	WPPT 35		Philadelphia, Pennsylvania	Lehigh Valley Public Telecommunications Corporation	
PBS	WQED 13		Pittsburgh, Pennsylvania	WQED Multimedia	
PBS	**WNET 13**		Newark, New Jersey–New York City, New York	WNET Group	PBS flagship station
PBS	**WTTW 11**		Chicago, Illinois	Window to the World Communications, Inc.	
PBS	**WTVS 56**		Detroit, Michigan	Detroit Educational Television Foundation	
PBS	WVIA-TV 44		Scranton, Pennsylvania	Northeast Pennsylvania Educational Television Association	
Roar	WUTB 24	-	Baltimore, Maryland	Sinclair Broadcast Group	
Roar	WTTE 28	-	Columbus, Ohio	Sinclair Broadcast Group	
ShopHQ	WMCN-TV 44		Princeton, New Jersey	WRNN-TV Associates (WRNN License Company, LLC)	
ShopHQ	WRNN-TV 48		Kingston, New York	WRNN-TV Associates (WRNN License Company, LLC)	
TBN	WGTW-TV 48	-	Millville, New Jersey–Philadelphia, Pennsylvania	Trinity Broadcasting Network	
Telemundo	**WKAQ-TV 2**		San Juan, Puerto Rico	Comcast (Telemundo Station Group)	Spanish language station
Telemundo	**WNJU 47**		Linden, New Jersey–New York City, New York	Comcast (Telemundo Station Group)	Spanish language station
True Crime Network	WWJE-DT 50	-	Derry, New Hampshire	Univision Communications	
World	WNVT 53		Richmond, Virginia	VPM Media Corporation	Simulcast on WNVC 56, Charlottesville, Virginia
Cozi TV	WIWN 68		Fond du Lac, Wisconsin	Family Worship Center Church, Inc.	
Defy	WDWO-CD 18		Detroit, Michigan	Innovate Corp.	
Daystar Television Network	**WTCV 18**		San Juan, Puerto Rico	Daystar Television Network	
Daystar Television Network	**WUDT-LD 23**		Detroit, Michigan	Daystar Television Network	

== Multicultural ==
Name	Owner	Description
&TV	Zee Entertainment Enterprises	
3ABN Français	Three Angels Broadcasting Network	French television channel based in West Frankfort, Illinois
3ABN International	Three Angels Broadcasting Network	Programming as seen on 3ABN including other programming produced by 3ABN Australia
3ABN Russia	Three Angels Broadcasting Network	Russian television channel based in Nizhny Novgorod, Russia
The Africa Channel	Various Investors	African television channel based in North Hollywood, Los Angeles, California
Voice of America Persian News Network	Voice of America	
The Filipino Channel	ABS-CBN Corporation	
GMA Life TV	GMA Network Inc.	
GMA Pinoy TV	GMA Network Inc.	
Alhurra	Middle East Broadcasting Networks	
Phoenix North America Chinese Channel	Phoenix Television	
Front Row Channel	Jungo TV	
Hallypop	Jungo TV	
Kapatid Channel	MediaQuest Holdings	
Saigon Broadcasting Television Network	SBTN Inc.	
AMGA TV	Armenian Media Group of America	Armenian TV channel based in Glendale, California
The Arabic Channel	Allied Media	Arabic TV channel based in New York City, New York
Afrotainment	Soundview Africa	African TV channel based in New York City, New York
Afrotainment Music	Soundview Africa	African music channel based in New York City, New York
AABC TV	Armenian American Broadcasting Corporation	Armenian TV channel based in Glendale, California
ARTN	Armenian-Russian Television Network	Armenian TV channel based in Glendale, California
Animax	Sony Pictures Entertainment Japan	Southeastern Asian 24/7 anime channel.
Aniplus	Plus Media Networks Asia	Southeastern Asian 24/7 anime channel.
Arirang TV	Korea International Broadcasting Foundation	Korean television channel based in Seoul, South Korea
Asia Vision	AsiaVision, Inc.	
B4U Movies	B4U	
B4U Music	B4U	
Bonjour America	Bonjour America Media Group	TV channel in French based in Miami, Florida
Bostel	RTV Bostel	Bosnian TV channel based in Chicago
CaribVision Inc.	Caribbean Media Corporation (CMC)	CaribVision is a 24/7 English language Caribbean cable television channel based in Barbados, with affiliate studios in the United States.
DFH Network	DFH Network Inc.	Turkish pay television service based in Santa Ana, California comprising seven channels
Diya TV	Ravi Kapur	
Eleven Sports Network	Eleven Sports	International sports channel based in Stamford, Connecticut
German Kino Plus	FennFamLLC	German TV channel based in Marietta, Georgia
High Vision	HighVisionTV	Armenian TV channel based in Glendale, California
Horizon TV	Horizon Armenian TV	Armenian TV channel based in Glendale, California
ITV Gold	International Broadcasting Network	South Asian TV channel based in Long Island City, New York
Impact Television	Impact Television Network	Russian TV channel based in Sacramento, California
Jewish Broadcasting Service	English news and cultural Jewish TV channel	Jewish TV channel based in Fort Lee, New Jersey
Jewish Life Television	Jewish Life Television	Jewish TV channel based in Los Angeles, California
JUS One	JUS Broadcasting	Punjabi TV channel based in Long Island City, New York
JUS Punjabi	JUS Broadcasting	Punjabi TV channel based in Long Island City, New York
KBS America	Korean Broadcasting System	
KO-AM TV	KO_AM TV Inc.	Korean TV channel based in Seattle
The Korean Channel	The Korean Channel Inc.	Korean TV channel based in College Point, Queens, New York
MBC America	Munhwa Broadcasting Corporation	
MKTV	Media Korea Inc.	Korean TV channel based in Fort Lee, New Jersey
Myx TV	ABS-CBN Corporation	Asian-American TV channel based in the Los Angeles metropolitan area
New Greek TV	New Greek TV Inc.	Greek TV channel based in Astoria, Queens NY
New Tang Dynasty Television	Epoch Media Group	
PanArmenian TV	PanArmenian TV	Armenian TV channel based in Glendale, California
Peace TV	Zakir Naik	
Polvision	Walter Kotaba	Polish TV channel based in Chicago
RSC	Romanian Satellite Network	Romanian pay television service based in Rockville, Maryland, comprising five channels
TV503 Crossing TV	Lincoln Square Media	Russian TV channel based in New York City
Saigon Broadcasting Television Network	SBTN Inc.	Vietnamese TV channel based in Garden Grove, California
SBS America	Seoul Broadcasting System	
Sino TV	Multicultural Radio Broadcasting Inc.	Chinese channel based in New York City, New York
Sky Link TV	Sky Link TV Inc.	Chinese TV channel based in Rosemead, California
SPT TV	Seabra Portuguese Television	Portuguese TV channel based in Newark, New Jersey
Tai Seng Sat TV	Tai Seng Entertainment	Chinese TV channel based in San Francisco, California
Tapesh TV	Persian Broadcasting Company	Persian TV channel based in Los Angeles, California
Jadeworld	TVB USA Inc.	Chinese TV channel based in Norwalk, California
TV Asia	Asia Star Broadcasting Inc	South Asian TV channel, based in Edison, New Jersey
tvK	Television Korea24 Inc.	Korean TV channel based in Los Angeles, California
USArmenia TV	USATV LLC	Armenian TV channel based in Glendale, California
Viên Thao TV	Vien Thao Media	Vietnamese TV channel based in San Jose, California
VIETV	Kevin Ngo	
Zee TV	Zee Entertainment Enterprises	Hindi TV channel headquartered in Iselin, New Jersey

== Radio channels ==
The following are audio-only channels available to pay television users; some channels use freeze frame television to display information on screen:

Genre	Name	Number of Channels	Owner	Notes
Variety	SiriusXM	134	Sirius XM Holdings	Available on Dish Network channels 6002 to 6099/Hopper 99
Music	DMX (SongTap)	84	Mood Media	Digital audio service available to commercial establishments
Music	Music Choice	50	Comcast, Cox Communications, Charter Communications, Microsoft, Arris International and Verizon Communications	Digital audio service available through digital cable and Metal Choice on channel 822.
Music	Muzak	60	Muzak Holdings	Digital audio service available to commercial establishments. Available on Dish Network channels 920 to 979, and 981.
Music	Stingray Music	400	Stingray Group (Canada)	Available on AT&T U-verse channels 5100 to 5174.

== See also ==
- Cable television in the United States
- High-definition television in the United States
- Satellite television in the United States
- Television in the United States

Lists

- List of Canadian television stations available in the United States
- List of defunct television networks in the United States
- List of television stations in the United States
- List of United States over-the-air television networks
- List of United States stations available in Canada
- List of television stations in North America by media market
- Streaming service
