= High-definition television in the United States =

High-definition television (HDTV) in the United States was introduced in 1998 and has since become increasingly popular and dominant in the television market. Hundreds of HD channels are available in millions of homes and businesses both terrestrially and via subscription services such as satellite, cable and IPTV. HDTV has quickly become the standard, with about 85% of all TVs used being HD as of 2018. In the US, the 720p and 1080i formats are used for linear channels, while 1080p is available on a limited basis, mainly for pay-per-view and video on demand content. Some networks have also begun transmitting content at 1080p via ATSC 3.0 multiplex channels, with CBS and NBC affiliates being the main stations that transmit at 1080p.

== Proposals and introduction ==
The Federal Communications Commission (FCC) began soliciting proposals for a new television standard for the U.S. in the late 1980s and later decided to ask companies competing to create the standard to pool their resources and work together, forming what was known as the Grand Alliance in 1993.

On July 23, 1996, WRAL-TV (the then CBS affiliate in Raleigh, North Carolina; now affiliated with NBC) became the first television station in the United States to broadcast a digital television signal.

HDTV sets became available in the U.S. in 1998 and broadcasts began around November 1998. The first public HDTV broadcast was of the launch of the Space Shuttle Discovery and John Glenn's return to space; that broadcast was made possible in part by the Harris Corporation. The first commercial broadcast of a local sporting event in HD was during Major League Baseball's Opening Day on March 31, 1998, the Texas Rangers against the Chicago White Sox from The Ballpark in Arlington in Arlington, TX. The telecast was produced by LIN Productions, and overseen by LIN Productions president and Texas Rangers television executive producer Lee Spieckerman. The game was also the inaugural telecast on the digital channel of Dallas/Fort Worth, Texas NBC affiliate KXAS channel 5. The event was simultaneously shown via satellite at a reception attended by members of congress, the FCC and members of the industry in Washington, DC. This telecast was also the first commercial HD broadcast in the state of Texas. The first major sporting event broadcast nationwide in HD was Super Bowl XXXIV, broadcast by ABC on January 30, 2000. By the 2014–15 season every network show producing new episodes had transitioned to high definition.

== Satellite and cable ==
Satellite television companies in the United States, such as Dish Network and DirecTV, started to carry HD programming in 2003. Satellite transmissions in the U.S. use various forms of PSK modulation. A separate tuner is required to receive HD satellite broadcasts.

Cable television companies in the U.S. generally prefer to use 256-QAM to transmit HDTV. Many of the newer HDTVs with integrated digital tuners include support for decoding 256-QAM in addition to 8VSB for OTA digital. Cable television companies started carrying HDTV in 2003.

Currently, HD programming is carried by all major television networks in nearly all DMAs, including ABC, CBS, NBC, FOX, PBS, The CW, MyNetworkTV, Telemundo, Univision, and UniMás; and on many independent stations. All but a select few of cable networks offer an HD broadcast to cable and satellite companies.

HD programming on broadcast channels and premium content providers such as HBO and Showtime had Dolby Digital 5.1.

== List of current American high-definition channels ==
| Name | First-launched HD service | HD Format | Letterbox/Pillarbox | Category | Type |
|---|---|---|---|---|---|
| A&E | September 4, 2006 | 1080i | N/A | Entertainment | Cable |
| ABC | September 16, 2001 | 720p | Pillarbox (2001–2016); Letterbox (2016–present) | Broadcast | |
| AccuWeather Network | March 10, 2015 | 1080i | N/A | News | Cable |
| Adult Swim | October 15, 2007 | 1080i | Pillarbox (2007–2013); Letterbox (2013–present) | Entertainment | Cable |
| Altitude | N/A | 1080i | | Sports - Regional | Cable |
| AMC | 2008 | 1080i | | Entertainment | Cable |
| American Heroes Channel | N/A | 1080i | | Entertainment | Cable |
| Animal Planet | 2007 | 1080i | | Lifestyle | Cable |
| AT&T SportsNet | April 1, 2011 | 1080p | | Sports – Regional | Cable |
| ASPiRE | June 27, 2012 | 1080i | | Entertainment | Cable |
| AWE | June 1, 2004 | 1080i | | Lifestyle | Cable |
| AXS TV | September 6, 2001 | 1080i | | Entertainment | Cable |
| Azteca | July 16, 2012 | 1080i | | Broadcast – Spanish | Broadcast |
| BBC America | July 20, 2009 | 1080i | | Entertainment | Cable |
| BBC World News | August 5, 2013 | 1080i | | News | Cable |
| beIN Sports | June 1, 2012 | 720p | | Sports | Cable |
| beIN Sports en Español | June 1, 2012 | 720p | | Sports – Spanish | Cable |
| BET | 2008 | 1080i | | Entertainment | Cable |
| BET Her | March 23, 2011 | 1080i | | Entertainment | Cable |
| Big Ten Network | 2009 | 720p | | Sports - College | Cable |
| Bloomberg TV | May 9, 2011 | 1080i | | News | Cable |
| Boomerang (TV network) | March 4, 2019 | 720p | | Family | Cable |
| Bravo | 2007 | 1080i | | Lifestyle | Cable |
| Cars.TV | May 2009 | 1080i | | Sports | Cable |
| Cartoon Network | October 15, 2007 | 1080i | Pillarbox (2007–2013); Letterbox (2013–present) | Family | Cable |
| CBS | September 1998 | 1080i | Pillarbox (1998–2018); Letterbox (2018–present) | Broadcast | |
| CBS Sports Network | August 2008 | 1080i | | Sports | Cable |
| Cinemax (MoreMax, ActionMax, ThrillerMax, 5starMax, MovieMax, OuterMax, MaxLatino) | September 1, 2008 | 1080i | | Premium Movies | Premium |
| CMT | N/A | 1080i | | Entertainment | Cable |
| CNBC | October 10, 2007 | 1080i | Pillarbox (2007-2014) Letterbox (2014-present) | News | Cable |
| CNN | September 6, 2007 | 1080i | | News | Cable |
| Comedy Central | January 13, 2009 | 1080i | Pillarbox (2009-2018) Letterbox (2018-present) | Entertainment | Cable |
| Comedy.TV | May 2009 | 1080i | | Entertainment | Cable |
| Cooking Channel | March 31, 2008 | 1080i | | Lifestyle | Cable |
| Crime & Investigation Network | April 1, 2005 | 720p | Pillarbox | Entertainment | Cable |
| The CW | September 18, 2006 | 1080i | | Broadcast | |
| Daystar | N/A | 720p | | Religion | Cable |
| Destination America | March 31, 2008 | 1080i | | Lifestyle | Cable |
| Discovery Channel | June 2002 | 1080i | | Entertainment | Cable |
| Discovery en Español | July 2016 | 1080i | | Spanish | Cable |
| Discovery Familia | July 2016 | 1080i | | Spanish | Cable |
| Discovery Family | May 2010 | 1080i | | Family | Cable |
| Discovery Life | February 1, 2011 | 1080i | | Lifestyle | Cable |
| Disney Channel | April 2, 2008 | 720p | Pillarbox (2008–2017); Letterbox (2017–present) | Family | Cable |
| Disney Junior | March 23, 2012 | 720p | Pillarbox (2012–2017); Letterbox (2017–present) | Family | Cable |
| Disney XD | February 13, 2009 | 720p | Pillarbox (2009–2017); Letterbox (2017–present) | Family | Cable |
| E! | December 8, 2008 | 1080i | | Lifestyle | Cable |
| Epix (Epix 2, Epix Hits) | October 30, 2009 | 1080i | | Premium Movies | Cable |
| ES.TV | May 2009 | 1080i | | Entertainment | Cable |
| ESPN | March 30, 2003 | 720p | | Sports | Cable |
| ESPN2 | January 2005 | 720p | | Sports | Cable |
| ESPNews | March 30, 2008 | 720p | | Sports | Cable |
| ESPNU | March 23, 2010 | 720p | | Sports | Cable |
| ESPN Deportes | January 7, 2004 | 720p | | Sports – Spanish | Cable |
| EVINE Live | February 13, 2015 | 1080i | | Shopping | Cable |
| FM | September 30, 2015 | 1080i | | Music | Cable |
| Food Network | March 31, 2008 | 1080i | | Lifestyle | Cable |
| Fox | September 12, 2004 | 720p | Pillarbox (2004–2007); Letterbox (2007–present) | Broadcast | |
| Fox Business Network | October 15, 2007 | 720p | | News | Cable |
| Fox Deportes | N/A | 720p | | Sports – Spanish | Cable |
| Fox News Channel | April 29, 2008 | 720p | | News | Cable |
| FS1 | N/A | 720p | | Sports | Cable |
| FS2 | N/A | 720p | | Sports | Cable |
| Fox Soccer Plus | June 15, 2010 | 720p | | Sports | Cable |
| Fox Sports Networks (All Networks) | July 2010 | 720p | | Sports – Regional | Cable |
| Freeform | 2008 | 720p | | Family | Cable |
| Fuse | 2008 | 1080i | | Music | Cable |
| FX | 2007 | 720p | | Entertainment | Cable |
| FXM | 2007 | 720p | | Movies | Cable |
| FXX | September 2, 2013 | 720p | | Entertainment | Cable |
| FYI | January 1, 1999 | 720p | | Lifestyle | Cable |
| Great American Family | October 1, 2013 | 1080i | | Family | Cable |
| GAC Living | 2014 | 1080i | | Lifestyle | Cable |
| Galavisión | June 1, 2010 | 1080i | | Spanish | Cable |
| Gol TV | August 1, 2010 | 1080i | | Sports – Spanish | Cable |
| Golf Channel | January 2007 | 1080i | | Sports | Cable |
| Game Show Network | September 15, 2010 | 1080i | | Entertainment | Cable |
| Hallmark Channel | N/A | 1080i | | Family | Cable |
| Hallmark Movies & Mysteries | January 20, 2004 | 1080i | | Movies | Cable |
| HBO (HBO2, HBO Comedy, HBO Family, HBO Latino, HBO Signature, HBO Zone) | March 6, 1999 | 1080i | | Premium Movies | Premium |
| HDNet Movies | January 13, 2003 | 1080i | | Movies | Cable |
| HGTV | March 31, 2008 | 1080i | Pillarbox (2008-2013) Letterbox (2013-present) | Lifestyle | Cable |
| History | January 2008 | 1080i | | Entertainment | Cable |
| HLN | December 15, 2008 | 1080i | | News | Cable |
| HSN | August 2009 | 1080i | | Shopping | Cable |
| HSN 2 | August 2009 | 1080i | | Shopping | Cable |
| IFC | 2007 | 1080i | | Movies | Cable |
| Investigation Discovery | N/A | 1080i | | Entertainment | Cable |
| Ion | February 16, 2009 | 720p | | Broadcast | |
| Justice Central | N/A | 1080i | | News | Cable |
| Lifetime | April 16, 2008 | 1080i | | Lifestyle | Cable |
| LMN | 2007 | 1080i | | Lifestyle | Cable |
| Logo TV | June 30, 2005 | 1080i | | Lifestyle | Cable |
| Magnolia Network | May 1, 2010 | 1080i | | Lifestyle | Cable |
| MASN (MASN2) | September 16, 2008 | 1080i | | Sports – Regional | Cable |
| Racer Network | October 1, 2004 | 1080i | | Sports | Cable |
| Mega TV | March 1, 2006 | 1080i | | Broadcast – Spanish | Cable |
| MGM HD | October 10, 2007 | 1080i | | Movies | Premium |
| Midco Sports Network | N/A | 1080i | | Sports – Regional | Cable |
| Minnesota Channel | October 2012 | 1080i | | Entertainment | Broadcast |
| MLB Network | December 17, 2008 | 720p | | Sports | Cable |
| MLB StrikeZone | December 17, 2008 | 720p | | Sports | Cable |
| Motor Trend | June 17, 2002 | 1080i | | Sports | Cable |
| The Movie Channel (The Movie Channel Xtra) | December 1, 2003 | 1080i | | Premium Movies | Premium |
| MoviePlex (IndiePlex, RetroPlex) | February 11, 2010 | 1080i | | Premium Movies | Premium |
| MSG (MSG Plus, MSG Western New York) | January 22, 2009 | 1080i | | Sports – Regional | Cable |
| MS NOW | June 29, 2009 | 1080i | | News | Cable |
| MTV | December 2007 | 1080i | | Entertainment | Cable |
| MTV2 | 2012 | 1080i | | Entertainment | Cable |
| MTV Live | January 16, 2006 | 1080i | | Music | Cable |
| MyDestination.TV | N/A | 1080i | | Lifestyle | Cable |
| MyNetworkTV | September 5, 2006 | 720p | | Broadcast | |
| Nat Geo Wild | March 29, 2010 | 720p | | Lifestyle | Cable |
| National Geographic | January 2006 | 720p | | Entertainment | Cable |
| NBA TV | October 30, 2007 | 1080i | | Sports | Cable |
| NBC | April 26, 1999 | 1080i | Pillarbox (1999–2002); Letterbox (2002–present) | Broadcast | |
| NBC Sports Regional Networks | 2010 | 1080i | | Sports – Regional | Cable |
| Universo | February 1, 2015 | 1080i | | Spanish | Cable |
| NESN | April 2006 | 1080i | | Sports – Regional | Cable |
| Newsmax TV | June 16, 2014 | 1080i | | News | Cable |
| NewsNation | N/A | 1080i | | News | Cable |
| NFL Network | August 2004 | 1080i | | Sports | Cable |
| NFL RedZone | September 13, 2009 | 1080i | | Sports | Cable |
| NHL Network | October 1, 2007 | 1080i | | Sports | Cable |
| Nick at Nite | November 14, 2007 | 1080i | Pillarbox (2007-2020); Letterbox (2020-present) | Family | Cable |
| Nickelodeon | November 14, 2007 | 1080i | Pillarbox (2007-2020); Letterbox (2020-present) | Family | Cable |
| Nicktoons | August 13, 2013 | 1080i | Pillarbox (2013–2020); Letterbox (2020–present) | Family | Cable |
| Nick Jr. Channel | August 1, 2013 | 1080i | Pillarbox (2013–2020); Letterbox (2020–present) | Family | Cable |
| One America News Network | July 4, 2013 | 1080i | | News | Cable |
| Outdoor Channel | 2004 | 1080i | | Sports | Cable |
| Ovation | July 2010 | 1080i | | Lifestyle | Cable |
| OWN | January 1, 2011 | 1080i | | Lifestyle | Cable |
| Oxygen | March 2011 | 1080i | | Lifestyle | Cable |
| Pac-12 Network | August 15, 2012 | 1080i | | Sports – College | Cable |
| Paramount Network | January 2008 | 1080i | | Entertainment | Cable |
| PBS | March 1, 2004 | 1080i | Both | Broadcast | |
| Pets.TV | N/A | 1080i | | Lifestyle | Cable |
| Playboy TV | 2008 | 1080i | | Adult | Cable |
| Pop | N/A | 1080i | | Lifestyle | Cable |
| QVC | May 2009 | 1080i | | Shopping | Cable |
| Recipe.TV | N/A | 1080i | | Lifestyle | Cable |
| Reelz | August 1, 2010 | 720p | | Entertainment | Cable |
| Revolt | October 21, 2013 | 1080i | | Music | Cable |
| RFD-TV | July 26, 2007 | 1080i | | Lifestyle | Cable |
| Science | September 1, 2009 | 1080i | | Lifestyle | Cable |
| SEC Network | August 14, 2014 | 720p | | Sports - College | Cable |
| ShortsTV | February 17, 2010 | 1080i | | Movies | Cable |
| Showtime (Showtime 2, Showcase, Showtime Extreme, SHO×BET, Showtime Next, Showtime Women) | July 25, 2013 | 1080i | | Premium Movies | Premium |
| Smithsonian Channel | September 26, 2007 | 1080i | | Lifestyle | Cable |
| SNY | March 16, 2006 | 1080i | | Sports – Regional | Cable |
| Sony Movie Channel | October 1, 2010 | 1080i | | Movies | Cable |
| Spectrum SportsNet LA | February 25, 2014 | 1080i | | Sports – Regional | Cable |
| Spectrum SportsNet | N/A | 1080i | | Sports – Regional | Cable |
| Sportsman Channel | January 25, 2010 | 1080i | | Sports | Cable |
| Starz (Starz Comedy, Starz Edge, Starz Kids and Family, Starz InBlack, Starz Cinema) | December 2003 | 1080i | | Premium Movies | Premium |
| Starz Encore (Starz Encore, Starz Encore Action, Starz Encore Black, Starz Encore Classic, Starz Encore Suspense) | March 22, 2003 | 1080i | | Premium Movies | Premium |
| SundanceTV | July 1, 2011 | 1080i | | Movies | Cable |
| Syfy | October 3, 2007 | 1080i | | Entertainment | Cable |
| TBS | September 1, 2007 | 1080i | Pillarbox (2007–2010); Letterbox (2010–present) | Entertainment | Cable |
| TCM | June 2009 | 1080i | | Movies | Cable |
| Telemundo | April 23, 2009 | 1080i | | Broadcast – Spanish | Broadcast |
| TeenNick | 2016 | 1080i | | Family | Cable |
| Tennis Channel | December 31, 2007 | 1080i | | Sports | Cable |
| TLC | September 1, 2007 | 1080i | | Lifestyle | Cable |
| TNT | May 21, 2004 | 1080i | | Entertainment | Cable |
| Travel Channel | N/A | 1080i | | Lifestyle | Cable |
| truTV | March 2011 | 1080i | | Entertainment | Cable |
| TUDN | April 7, 2012 | 1080i | | Sports – Spanish | Cable |
| TV Land | November 2011 | 1080i | | Family | Cable |
| TV One | January 19, 2004 | 1080i | | Entertainment | Cable |
| UniMás | January 1, 2010 | 1080i | | Broadcast – Spanish | Broadcast |
| Univision | January 1, 2010 | 1080i | | Broadcast – Spanish | Broadcast |
| UP tv | N/A | 1080i | | Family | Cable |
| UPN | September 2005 | 1080i | | Family | Cable |
| USA Network | October 2007 | 1080i | | Entertainment | Cable |
| Viceland | February 29, 2016 | 1080i | | Lifestyle | Cable |
| VH1 | 2005 | 1080i | | Entertainment | Cable |
| The WB | September 2002 | 1080i | | Family | Cable |
| WE tv | N/A | 1080i | | Lifestyle | Cable |
| The Weather Channel | September 26, 2007 | 1080i | | News | Cable |
| WeatherNation TV | October 27, 2011 | 1080i | | News | Cable |
| World Fishing Network | November 2007 | 1080i | | Sports | Cable |
| YES | July 2004 | | Sports – Regional | | |

== See also ==
- Big Three television networks
- Cable television in the United States
- Communications in the United States
- Fourth television network
- List of television stations in the United States
- List of United States pay television channels
- List of United States over-the-air television networks
- List of United States television markets
- Satellite television in the United States
- Television in the United States
- Television news in the United States
- United States cable news
