= PX Sports =

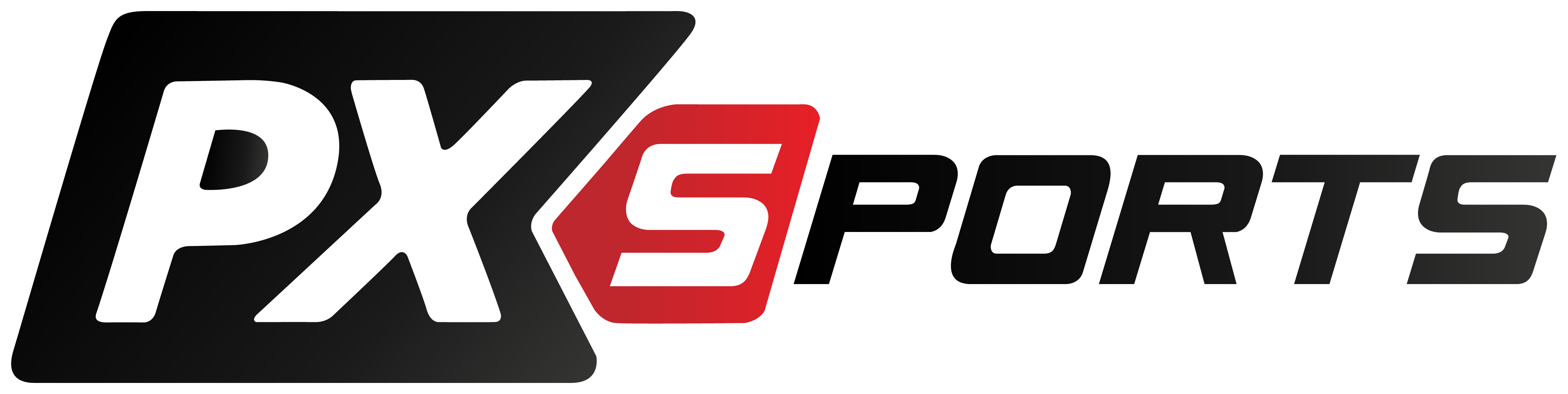
- Country: Mexico

Programming
- Language: Spanish

History
- Launched: April 1, 2011
- Former names: PXTV (2011–2017)

PX Sports (Primero Action Sports) is a Spanish-language pay television channel that focuses on music, lifestyle, and extreme action sports related programming including live and pre-recorded events such as surfing, skateboarding, mixed martial arts, motocross, drifting, and snowboarding.

PX Sports was founded in April 2011 and headquartered in Mexico City. The sports network has over 500 hours of original programming in collaboration with production houses such as Blue Print.

The network is currently broadcasting in Hispanic America in countries such as Mexico on Totalplay channel 528, Megacable channel 318, Cablecom channel 222, Ultravision channel 407, and Cablevision Monterrey on channel 310. PX Sports is available in the United States on DirecTV channel 471. PX Sports broadcasts in Colombia on TIGO channel 252, and on HV Multiplay channel 13. It also broadcasts in the United States with AT&T U-Verse on channel 3122 with a recent launch on TV Everywhere.

In July 2016, Olympusat added the channel to its OTT platform, VEMOX.

In January 2017, the channel was renamed to PX Sports.
