= Satellite television in the United States =

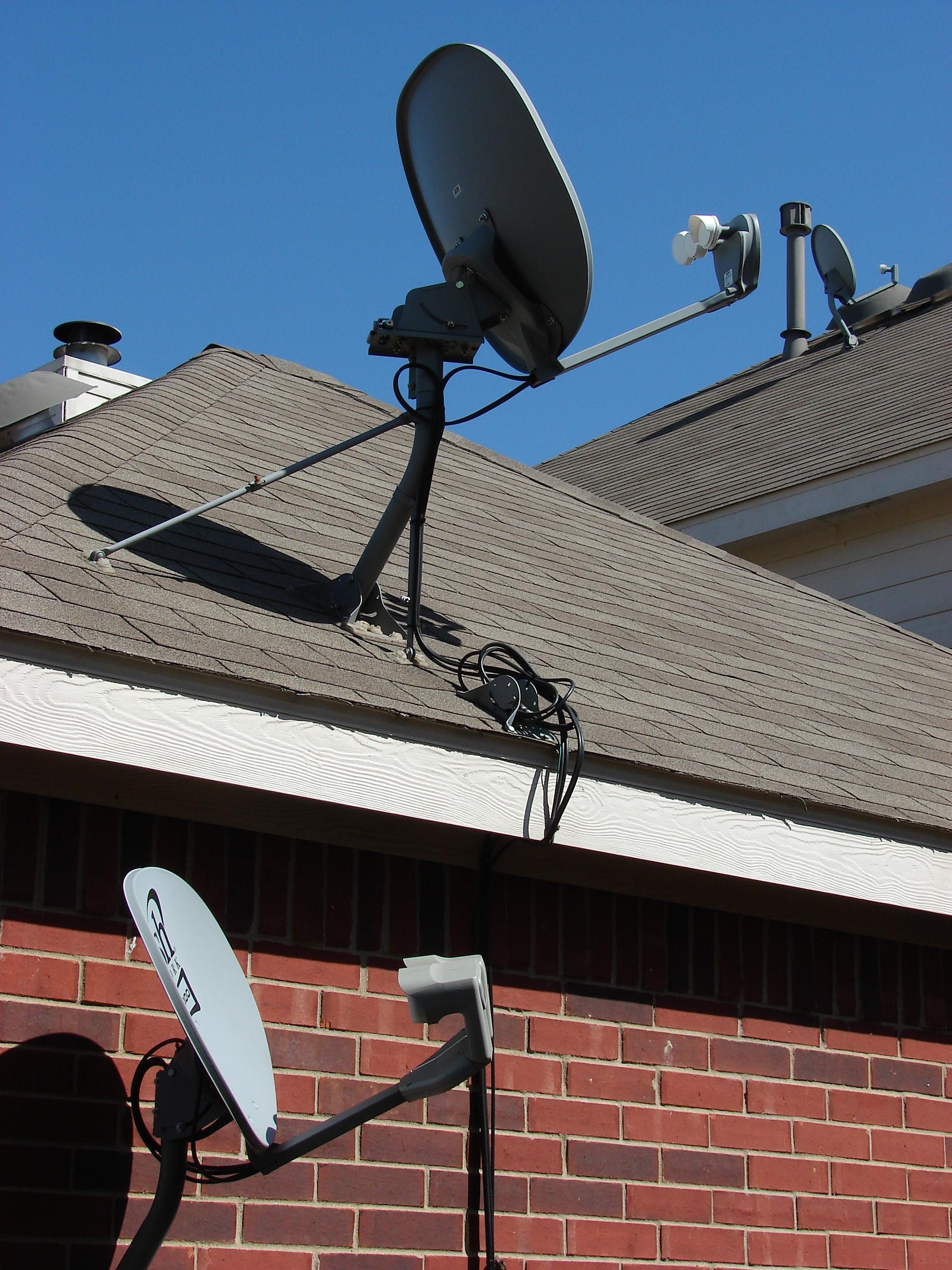
U.S. residential satellite TV receiver dishes

In 2017, there were two primary satellite television providers of subscription based service available to United States consumers: DirecTV and Dish Network, which have 21 and 10 million subscribers respectively. A 2021 Pew Research Center survey found that the percentage of American adults that reported having a cable or satellite television subscription fell from 76% in 2015 to 56% in 2021, while a 2025 Pew Research Center survey found that only 36% of American adults reported having a cable or satellite television subscription.

== 1970s ==
In December 1975, RCA created Satcom 1, the first satellite built especially for use by the then three national television networks (CBS, NBC, and ABC). Later that same year, HBO leased a transponder on Satcom 1 and began transmission of television programs via satellite to cable systems. Owners of cable systems paid $10,000 to install 3-meter dishes to receive TV signals in C band. In 1976 Taylor Howard built an amateur system, which consisted of a converted military surplus radar dish and a satellite receiver designed and built by Howard, for home satellite reception. Taylor's system could be used for receiving TV programs both from American and Soviet communication satellites. In 1977 Pat Robertson launched the first satellite-delivered basic cable service called the CBN Cable Network. In 1979, the Satellite Home Viewers Act allowed homeowners in the United States to both own and operate their own home satellite system, consisting of C-band equipment from a multitude of manufacturers who were making parts for systems such as Taylor Howard's, and began a large controversy of which channels could be received by whom.

== 1980s ==
USSB was a direct-to-home service founded in 1981. In the early 1990s, they partnered with Hughes and continued operation until purchased in 1998 by DirecTV.

== 1990s ==
In November 1990, Primestar launched as the first North American direct-broadcast satellite service. Hughes's DirecTV, the first national high-powered upper K_{u}-band satellite TV system, went online in 1994. The DirecTV system became the new delivery vehicle for USSB. In 1996, EchoStar's Dish Network went online in the United States and has gone on to similar success as DirecTV's primary competitor. The AlphaStar service launched in 1996 and went into bankruptcy in 1997. Primestar sold its assets to Hughes in 1999. Dominion Video Satellite Inc's Sky Angel also went online in the United States in 1996 with its satellite TV service geared towards "faith and family" until they sold the license to EchoStar Communications Corporation in 2008 and switched to an IPTV platform.

== 2000s ==
In 2004, Cablevision's Voom service went online, specifically catering to the emerging market of HDTV owners and aficionados, but folded in April 2005. The service's "exclusive" high-definition channels were migrated to the Dish Network system. Commercial satellite TV services are the primary competition to cable television service, although the two types of service have significantly different regulatory requirements (for example, cable television has public access requirements, and the two types of distribution have different regulations regarding carriage of local stations).

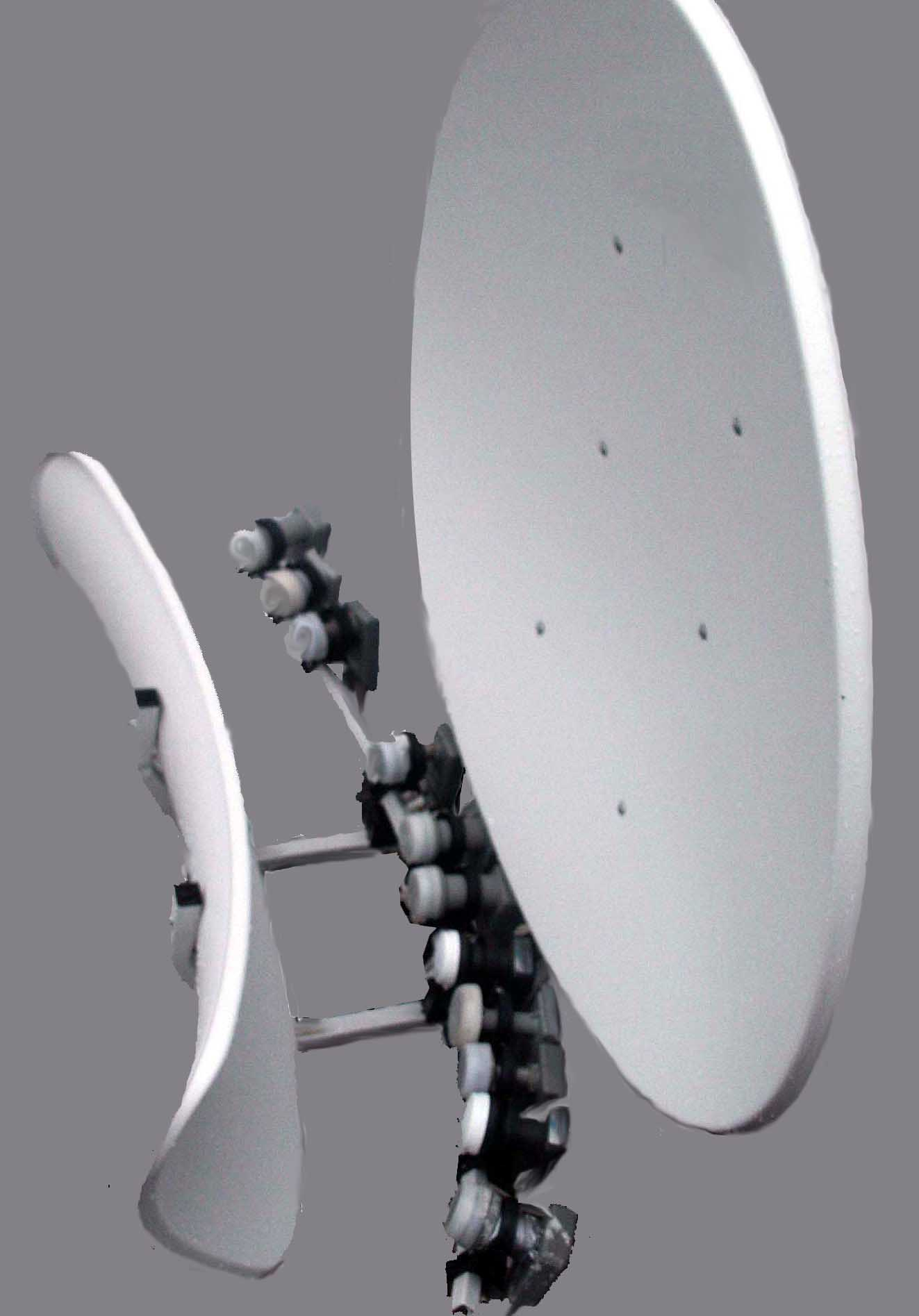
90cm multiple-LNA toroidal satellite dish

The majority of ethnic-language broadcasts in North America are carried on K_{u} band free-to-air. The largest concentration of free-to-air programming is on Galaxy 19 at 97° W. Pittsburgh International Telecommunications and GlobeCast World TV offers a mix of free and pay-TV ethnic channels in the internationally standard DVB-S and S2 formats, as do others. Home2US Communications Inc. also offers several ethnic channels on SES 1 at 101° W, as well as other free and pay-TV channels. Many religious broadcasters reach the DTH and distribution markets with unencrypted DVB-S television and radio channels on Galaxy 19. These channels are available as part of the Glorystar Satellite Service. Several U.S.-English language network affiliates (representing CBS, NBC, ABC, PBS, FOX, the CW (formerly the WB and UPN), ION Network and MyNetworkTV) are available as free-to-air broadcasts, as are the three U.S.-Spanish language networks (Univisión, Unimás and Telemundo). The number of free-to-air specialty channels is otherwise rather limited. Specific FTA offerings tend to appear and disappear rather often and typically with little or no notice, although sites such as LyngSat do track the changing availability of both free and pay channels worldwide.

On October 7, 2009, NAB TV Board chair Paul Karpowicz planned to testify before the Senate Communications Subcommittee that broadcasters would be willing to allow subscribers of distant signals to continue to do so even if the digital transition resulted in those subscribers receiving stations that they could not before. The NAB did oppose offering new distant signals if a digital signal was available. The Satellite TV Modernization Act had to be passed by the end of 2009. The House bill also allowed Dish Network to offer distant signals. On November 5, Senate Judiciary Committee chairman Patrick Leahy said he hoped for a "short-time agreement" on the bill passed out of committee September 24. If the Senate approves, the House will have to approve the bill, and if the two versions cannot be reconciled, the license to import signals that expires at the end of the year could be extended. The House version included an agreement with Echostar that, where possible, all 210 markets could receive signals, and Echostar could once again deliver distant signals.

On November 19, 2009, the Senate Commerce Committee approved a version of the bill, without an amendment requiring local signals in all markets in three years, though a study would be conducted on why 30 markets still had a problem. Before Senate approval, the two versions of the bill would have to be reconciled; the Judiciary Committee had a short market fix, while the Commerce committee bill required PBS in HD sooner.

On December 3, 2009, the House approved the Satellite Home Viewer Reauthorization Act. It included both the House Commerce Committee and House Judiciary Committee versions and renewed the ability to use distant signals for five years, allowed Dish Network to offer distant signals again, and required 28 markets to receive signals not available locally. The bill also dealt with some copyright issues and required Dish Network to offer HD non-commercial signals by 2011 instead of 2013.

One potential problem: determining who cannot receive a signal is still based on analog rather than digital TV.

== 2010s ==
On February 11, 2010, Senate Majority Leader Harry Reid said the satellite reauthorization was part of a jobs bill. Rick Boucher, House chairman for communications and the Internet, believed the bill would pass. The deadline is March, since it has been extended 60 days. Sen. Jim Bunning blocked the legislation in the Senate on Feb. 25, even though it passed the House. On March 1, 2010, The Satellite Television Extension and Localism Act of 2010, scheduled to expire in 2014, became part of a jobs bill with help from Sen. Patrick Leahy.

== See also ==
- Big Three television networks
- Cable television in the United States
- Communications in the United States
- Fourth television network
- High-definition television in the United States
- List of television stations in the United States
- List of United States pay television channels
- List of United States over-the-air television networks
- List of United States television markets
- Television in the United States
- Television news in the United States
- United States cable news
