= Nosey =

Nosy or nosey is an adjective for a person who is overly inquisitive about other people's affairs. It may also refer to:

== Arts and entertainment ==
- Nosy (album), a 2009 studio album by the Portuguese singer Gomo
- "Nosey", nickname of Aloysius Parker, a fictional character in the British mid-1960s television series Thunderbirds and several films
- Nosey Barbon, a character in the 1958 British film The Horse's Mouth
- Nosey, original name of Snitch, a character in The Numskulls comic strip
- Mr. Nosey, the protagonist and title of the fourth book in the Mr. Men children's series, by Roger Hargreaves
- Nosey, a TV series on children's programming block Milkshake! from 1997 to 2002
- Nosey (TV network), a television service offering reruns of tabloid talk shows

== Other uses ==
- Nosy, Piaseczno County, Poland, a village
- "Nosey", a nickname for Arthur Wellesley, 1st Duke of Wellington (1769-1852)
- "Nosey", nickname of Art Gauthier (1904-1977), Canadian ice hockey player
- Nosey, an elephant which lived in the Fresno Chaffee Zoo from 1949 to 1993

== See also ==
- Golden Nosey, an annual International Society of Caricature Artists award
