= The Korean Channel =

American Korean-language TV channel

The Korean Channel is the first Korean-speaking television channel in the United States. Based in College Point, Queens in New York City, it was a local cable station from launch until 2017, when it was made available nationwide on DirecTV. It airs programming syndicated from Korean television networks, as well as local programming.

== History ==
The channel started broadcasting on March 7, 1986, by initiative of founder Sam (Sang-ki) Han. Before its launch, Korean dramas, news and variety shows were broadcast on WNJU (currently a Telemundo O&O) on Sunday mornings in 1982 between 9am and 10:30am under the name Daehan Broadcast. When it started, it delivered a daily twelve-hour schedule from 12pm to 12am on the Brooklyn-Queens Cable System, as one of the first ethnic channels available.

The channel over time expanded its schedule to include live coverage of special events such as Korean presidential elections, the 1988 Summer Olympic Games held in Seoul, began carrying KBS news bulletins live by satellite in 1989 and provided Korean commentary of the 1990 FIFA World Cup to subscribers on a pay-per-view basis. The channel extended to 18 hours in 1990 and to 24 hours in 1991, after which a direct fiber link was established with the cable company. The channel broadcast from a converted warehouse in Flushing in its early years. As of 1991, the channel charged $12 per subscription and was reaching 4,000 households.

Since 2004, the channel has an agreement with SBS to provide content. In 2014, the channel was made available on DirecTV, enabling the channel to be available on a national scale for the first time.
