= Entertainment Studios Networks =

Group of TV channels

Entertainment Studios Networks Allen Media Group Networks
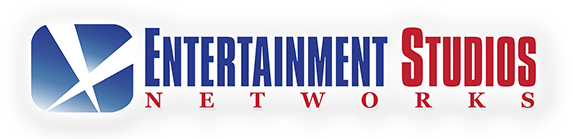
- Country: United States
- Broadcast area: United States
- Headquarters: Los Angeles, California

Programming
- Language: American English
- Picture format: 1080i (HDTV)

Ownership
- Owner: Allen Media Group

History
- Launched: May 2009; 17 years ago

Links
- Website: entertainmentstudios.com; smarttv.com; esnetworks.tv

Availability

Streaming media
- Roku & Amazon Fire TV: SmartTV.com channel (likely to transfer to platform-agnostic Weather Channel Plus service in late 2021)

Entertainment Studios Networks, alternatively known as Allen Media Group Networks, is a group of seven high-definition cable networks operated by Allen Media Group, a company owned by and featuring comedian Byron Allen.

The seven networks include Cars.TV, Comedy.TV, ES.TV, Justice Central, MyDestination.TV, Pets.TV and Recipe.TV. All the shows appearing on the networks are produced and distributed exclusively by Entertainment Studios, but are also distributed in traditional broadcast syndication, to some controversy by cable providers who have rejected carriage of the networks under those grounds as providing low customer value when those programs are all available on traditional television stations.

Allen acquired The Weather Channel in early 2018, which mainly remained under carriage agreements via its old management, along with its own separate corporate structure that now falls under the same carriage agreement with ESN and Allen Media, his broadcast station's group.

== History ==
The networks were launched in May 2009 through a deal with Verizon FIOS, and have since expanded to several other pay-TV services. The networks are also offered direct-to-consumer through a Roku/Amazon Fire TV channel known as SmartTV.com.

On March 22, 2018, Allen Media Group (alternatively known as Entertainment Studios) announced its intent to acquire The Weather Channel's television assets from an NBCUniversal/Blackstone Group partnership. The actual value is undisclosed, but was reported to be around $300 million. The channel's non-television assets, which were separately sold to IBM two years prior, were not included in the sale. Likewise, the regional sports networks Entertainment Studios is purchasing in conjunction with Sinclair Broadcast Group, Bally Sports (formerly Fox Sports Networks), will be operated in a separate venture, Diamond Sports Ventures.

=== Ratings ===
As of the end of 2017, only two of the channels in the suite, Justice Central and Comedy.TV, maintained a nightly Nielsen average high enough to tabulate a rating, while the others five had such a low sample size, they were unable to be rated. The two channels also are regularly among the lowest rated Nielsen-measured networks in the United States. ESN has since classed the other five networks together as one unit known as "ESN Lifestyle" for ratings purposes to allow Nielsen classification, though this has not been reflected on-air.

As of 2019, Comedy.TV was the lowest-rated network measured by Nielsen, with an average of 1,000 prime time viewers. Justice Central had the highest viewership among Allen networks, averaging 11,000 viewers. The remaining five channels have a combined average of 3,000 viewers.

== Channels ==
- Cars.TV – Dedicated to notable cars, showcasing the collectors, designers, innovators and ultimate car enthusiasts.
- Comedy.TV – Comedians performing live and taped, as well as hosted talk and variety shows, including Comics Unleashed with Byron Allen, Comedy.TV, Funny You Should Ask, The World's Funniest Weather and Weather Gone Viral.
- ES.TV – Entertainment news, variety shows and celebrity profiles.
- Justice Central.TV – Reruns of Entertainment Studios' court shows, including America's Court with Judge Ross, We the People With Judge Lauren Lake and Justice for All with Judge Cristina Perez and older legal dramas like Perry Mason, Matlock and In the Heat of the Night.
- MyDestination.TV – Dedicated to showcasing exotic destinations around the world, and Beautiful Homes & Great Estates.
- Pets.TV – Dedicated to pets and pet lovers, celebrating the best in show and the people who love them.
- Recipe.TV – Showcasing chefs, recipes, food and cuisine from around the world.

== Carriage lawsuits ==
On December 3, 2014, a $10 billion racial discrimination lawsuit was filed against AT&T's U-verse division and DirecTV by the National Association of African American Owned Media (NAAAOM) for allegedly violating the Civil Rights Act of 1866. NAAAOM is headed by Entertainment Studios Vice-President Mark DeVitre. The lawsuit claimed that Entertainment Studio Networks were denied carriage by the two providers on racial concerns. In December 2015, AT&T and DirecTV (by then part of AT&T) reached a settlement with Entertainment Studios to carry the networks, with Comedy and Justice Central carried on DirecTV, and Comedy, Recipe, ES, MyDestination, Cars and Pets added to U-verse, along with Justice Central's existing carriage.

The same type of lawsuit, again for $10 billion, was filed against Charter on January 28, 2016, which seeks carriage as part of Charter's merger with Time Warner Cable and Bright House Networks into the front-facing Spectrum brand. Charter and Comcast (which had a separate $20 billion suit filed against them by Entertainment Studios and NAAOM) filed an appeal to dismiss the lawsuit in the United States Court of Appeals for the Ninth Circuit on First Amendment grounds, which was dismissed by the 9th Circuit on November 19, 2018, allowing the two suits to go forward to trial.

Comcast successfully petitioned the Supreme Court of the United States for writ of certiorari to challenge the Ninth Circuit's decision, which the Court granted in June 2019. In March 2020, the Supreme Court issued a 9-0 unanimous decision agreeing with Comcast that Allen must meet the high bar under the 1866 Civil Rights Act and prove that Comcast would have carried his channel "but for" his race. The court sent the case back to the 9th Circuit of reconsideration. In June 2020, Comcast and Allen settled the lawsuit and came to a broader agreement to carry Allen's broadcast stations and the Weather Channel, along with three of the ESN networks.

Charter settled their lawsuit with Allen on February 4, 2021, out-of-court for undisclosed terms. Spectrum systems thus added four ESN networks (Pets, Cars, Recipe and Justice Central) at the start of May 2021.

== See also ==
- Entertainers with Byron Allen, ESN's flagship program
