= Arizona NewsChannel =

Cable news television channel

Arizona NewsChannel was a 24-hour regional cable news television channel based in Phoenix, Arizona. The service was owned by Meredith Corporation, and is operated as a joint venture with independent station KTVK. The channel first launched on November 4, 1996.

The Arizona NewsChannel rebroadcast KTVK's local newscasts in a 24-hour format with the ability to cut in for breaking news. The service broadcast primarily on Cox Communications channel 82 (formerly 14) to the Phoenix Metro Area.
