= Reverse mirror =

In television (typically sports broadcasting), a reverse mirror refers to a situation in which two national television channels have their signals split regionally, such that each of two programs will be available in all (or almost all) regions on one of the two channels, but will not air on the same channel in both regions.

As an example, consider the following situation:

- Two games, Game 1 and Game 2, are being played simultaneously. The broadcast rights to both games are owned by the same company, which also controls both Channel A and Channel B, and there are no restrictions on airing both games in the same location.
- Channel A reaches more viewers than Channel B (for example, Channel A may be a broadcast network whereas Channel B might be a cable channel). Alternatively, other considerations, such as Canadian simultaneous substitution regulations, may make it more advantageous for Channel A to carry a particular game in a particular region.
- In Region X, Game 1 is determined to be of greater interest to viewers (or more advantageous to air on Channel A), while in Region Y, the same applies to Game 2.

Then in Region X, Game 1 will air on Channel A, and Game 2 will air on Channel B. In Region Y, these will be reversed: Game 2 will air on Channel A, and Game 1 will air on Channel B. This is usually accomplished by sending different feeds to the individual stations or cable companies transmitting the signals of each channel.

Note that simply "splitting the network" between multiple regional games (e.g. Sunday afternoon NFL games in the U.S.) is not a reverse mirror, since there is no alternate channel on which a secondary game from the same network can air (apart from premium pay-per-view packages such as NFL Sunday Ticket).

== Examples ==
- Saturday afternoon college football broadcasts on ABC (broadcast) and ESPN2 (cable)
  - In some cases, the ABC network will be split between three or more games. In these cases, the "best" game not being broadcast locally on ABC will air on ESPN2, and the remaining game(s) will be limited to online streaming via ESPN3.
- "Late window" Sunday afternoon NFL broadcasts in Canada, on Citytv (broadcast) and Rogers Sportsnet (cable), from 2010 to 2013
- From 2001 to 2005, Major League Baseball scheduled the League Championship Series such that both series had games played simultaneously on a single night. The game deemed to be of greatest interest in a particular market (including, invariably, the home markets of the teams involved) would air on Fox (broadcast), while FX (cable) would air the remaining game in that market.
