= TDV =

TDV may refer to:

- TDV 2200, a 1980s computer
- TDV Encyclopedia of Islam, first published in 1988
- The Digital Village, the precursor to British website h2g2
- "Truth Duty Valour", the motto of the Royal Military College of Canada
- TDV (Ukrainian: Товариство з додатковою відповідальністю), a type of Ukrainian legal entity
