= Beatbox (disambiguation) =

A beatboxer is a person who performs beatboxing vocal percussion.

Beatbox or beat box may also refer to:

- "Beat Box" (Art of Noise song)
- "Beatbox" (NCT Dream song)
- "Beat Box" (SpotemGottem song)
- "Beatbox", a song from the album Crossing the Rubicon by The Sounds
- B/E/A/T/B/O/X, a 2007 album by Glass Candy
- The Beatbox, an Irish music radio and TV show

== See also ==
- Drum machine, an electric device that imitates the sounds of a drum kit
- Boombox, a portable cassette or CD player
- Stomp box, a particular percussion instrument operated by the foot
