= 1080i =

Video mode

In TV streaming, high-definition television (HDTV) and video display technology, 1080i is a video display format with 1080 lines of vertical resolution and interlaced scanning method. This format was once a standard in HDTV. It was particularly used for broadcast television because it can deliver high-resolution images without needing excessive bandwidth. This format is used in the SMPTE 292M standard.

== Definition ==
1080 in 1080i refers to the horizontal lines that make up the resolution of the display. Each of the lines make up the detail and clarity of the display. The i stands for interlaced, a technique where the image is not displayed all at once. Instead, the frame is split into two fields. One field contains the odd-numbered lines, and the second contains the even lines. These fields are displayed in rapid succession, giving the appearance of a full image to the eye. The interlacing technique was made to improve the motion of the images without doubling the required bandwidth. This is useful in broadcasting, where bandwidth efficiency is crucial. The frame rate is typically 50 or 60 fields per second, depending on the area. This means 25 or 30 frames per second when the fields are combined.

== Difference with 1080p ==
The difference between 1080i and 1080p is how the lines of resolution are displayed. Both offer 1920x1080 pixels, but the display method is different. In 1080p, each frame is drawn line by line, from top to bottom, creating a complete image in a single pass. This results in a sharper and more stable picture, especially in fast-moving scenes, but 1080i uses an interlaced method. The two fields that make up a frame are captured at different times, leading to a misalignment in fast-moving parts of the image. This can cause errors like combing, where fast-moving objects appear to have a serrated edge. However, 1080i has been preferred in broadcast television due to its lower bandwidth requirements, so it’s more efficient for over-the-air or cable transmission.

== Historical context ==
1080i is from Multiple sub-Nyquist sampling encoding, a Japanese analog high-definition television system. 1080i was quickly made as a leading standard for HDTV broadcasts. Many broadcasters worldwide used it. The ATSC (Advanced Television Systems Committee) standards and the DVB (Digital Video Broadcasting) standards allowed for the transmission of 1080i video signals. The adoption of 1080i was efficient in sports broadcasting. Higher resolution allowed for more detail, especially in large stadium shots and fast-paced action. The format's efficiency in using available bandwidth made it a practical choice for broadcasters. However, it required more complex processing on receiving end to the deinterlaceing images for the displays on progressive-scan screens. 1080i played a crucial role in the early days of HDTV. It made the gap from standard-definition broadcasts and the high-definition future that would soon become the norm. While its use has diminished with the rise of 1080p and 4K resolutions, 1080i remains important in the evolution of television technology.

== Technical overview ==
=== Signal transmission ===
The 1080i video signals can be carried by four main digital television broadcast systems: ATSC, DVB, ISDB and DTMB. In both ATSC and DVB systems, the 1080i signal is compressed using codecs like MPEG-2 or H.264 to reduce the bandwidth required for transmission.

In the United States, 1080i is the preferred format for most broadcasters, with Warner Bros. Discovery, Paramount Global, and Comcast owning networks broadcasting in the format, along with most smaller broadcasters. Only Fox- and Disney-owned television networks, along with MLB Network and other cable networks use 720p as the preferred format for their networks; A&E Networks channels converted from 720p to 1080i in 2013 due to acquired networks already transmitting in the 1080i format. Many ABC affiliates owned by Hearst Television and former Belo Corporation stations owned by Tegna, along with individual affiliates of the three networks air their signals in 1080i and upscale network programming for control and transmission purposes, as most syndicated programming and advertising is produced and distributed in 1080i/p, removing having to downscale to 720p. This also allows local newscasts on the ABC affiliates to be produced in that higher resolution to match the picture quality of their 1080i competitors.

== PAL speed-up ==
Left: 24fps film. Right: how the same clip would appear at 25fps.

Motion pictures shot on film to fit a 16:9 widescreen format (1.78:1) are typically intended to be played back at 24 frames per second. When telecined and played back at the PAL standard 25 frames per second, films run 4.16̅% faster than the original, and 4.27083̅% faster than the NTSC film standard (Note: For NTSC playback, 24 fps sources are generally slowed down to 23.9̅7̅6̅0̅2̅3̅9̅7̅6̅ fps, to be able to fit into a 29.9̅7̅0̅0̅2̅9̅9̅7̅ fps timebase with a 3:2 pulldown.) at 23.9̅7̅6̅0̅2̅3̅9̅7̅6̅ frames per second. High-definition television (HDTV) broadcast standards utilize 1080i (interlaced) or 720p (progressive) formats, typically offering 1920x1080 resolution. Region-specific formats include 1080i25 for PAL (50 fields per second), 1080i30 for NTSC (60 fields per second), and 1080i24 for film, often converted via telecine for 25 or 30 frames per second, 1080i50/60 broadcasts.

PAL speed-up does not occur on footage intended for playback at 25 frames per second.

== See also ==
- Field (video)
- High-definition television in the United States
- Interlaced video
- List of common display resolutions
- Sony HDVS Wideband Analog Video
- Telecine
