= Megacable =

Mexican cable television company

Megacable Holdings S. A. B. de C.V.
- Type: Public
- Traded as: BMV: MEGA
- Industry: Telecommunications
- Founded: 1983; 43 years ago
- Headquarters: Guadalajara, Jalisco, Mexico
- Products: Cable television; Broadband internet; VoIP; Wireless
- Website: www.megacable.com.mx

Megacable Holdings S. A. B. de C.V., doing business as Megacable Comunicaciones, is a Mexican cable operator and provider of internet and phone service. It has its headquarters in, Guadalajara, Jalisco.

Since June 2006, Megacable has been in direct competition with Telmex offering telephone service in the city of Guadalajara under Megafón.

Megacable provides service to 250 cities in 25 states in Mexico.

== History ==
Megacable has its origins in two small cable companies called VICASIN and VICASON serving a handful of cities in the states of Sinaloa and Sonora, around 1983. Soon after initiating operations, the companies were merged and began the process of acquiring rights to operate other cable systems on the Pacific coast. In 1996, the company relocated its headquarters to Guadalajara where Megacable then focused on technological improvements.

In 1997, Megacable become the second broadband internet operator in Latin America (after Intercable in Monterrey) when it launched MegaRed, Internet por Cable. The company produces its own advertising and buys national TV and radio spots to promote itself.

In June 2006, Megacable started to offer a "Megafón" telephone service, becoming an official "triple play" communications company. In 2009, Megacable began offering 10MB broadband service throughout most of its service area.
