= WFN =

WFN may refer to:

- World Fishing Network, a Canadian and American English language TV channel
- the proprietary font format supplied with versions 1 and 2 of Corel Draw
- World Federation of Neurology
- WFN, the National Rail station code for Watford North railway station, Hertfordshire, England
