= Gurian =

Gurian may refer to:

- Gurians, one of the ethnographical groups of Georgians, inhabiting Guria
- Gurian Republic, a short-lived (1903–1906) rebellion in Guria Province, Georgia (Caucasus)
- Ghurian, a town in western Afghanistan
- Gurian-e Gora, a village in Kermanshah Province, Iran
- Gurian Guitars, defunct instrument making company founded by luthier Michael Gurian

== People with the surname ==
- Eric Gurian, American film and television producer, director, and writer
- Jeffrey L. Gurian, American dentist and comedian
- Naomi Gurian (born 1933), California lawyer and entertainment industry executive
- Michael Gurian, American author, child development consultant and social philosopher
- Michael Gurian (luthier) (born 1943), American luthier, guitar manufacturer (1965–82) and musical instrument materials supplier

== Other uses ==
- All pages beginning with gurian
