= Buffalo Chip Campground =

Event venue in Meade County, South Dakota

- The Largest Music Festival in Motorcycling
- Buffalo Chip Campground Logo
- Interactive map of Buffalo Chip Campground
- Address: 20622 Fort Meade Way
- Location: Sturgis, South Dakota, United States
- Coordinates: 44.4139°N 103.413749°W
- Owner: Rod Woodruff
- Type: Campground, Concert Event
- Events: Rock, Country, Classic rock

Website
- buffalochip.com

The Buffalo Chip Campground, also known as Sturgis Buffalo Chip, is a music and motorcycle festival located in Meade County, South Dakota, United States. The campground is a place for motorcycle enthusiasts and music festival visitors each year, and has been since its founding in 1981. Host to a 10-day Concert Series and thousands of motorcyclists each August during the annual Sturgis Motorcycle Rally, the Buffalo Chip provides a music festival, various other forms of entertainment, and full service tent, RV and cabin camping on 600 acres. The motorcycle and music festival also features entertainment including multiple disciplines of racing, exhibits, beauty pageants, dance performances, bike shows, world-record-breaking stunts, and military tributes.

Historical population
Census	Pop.	Note	%±
2020	7		—
U.S. Decennial Census

== History ==
The Sturgis Buffalo Chip, located outside of Sturgis, SD, began in 1981 in response to the City of Sturgis closing city park to bikers attending the Sturgis Motorcycle Rally.

The Sturgis Buffalo Chip featured Susan Nelson as the first artist to perform at its inaugural event, followed by Johnny Paycheck.

In the early years, motorcyclists roughed it in tents in little more than a pasture, however over the years the Buffalo Chip Campground improved infrastructure by installing electricity, drilling wells, laying asphalt, and erecting flush toilet facilities, shower houses, and RV sites. Additional attractions and amenities sprung up around the property including cabins, a swimming hole called the "Bikini Beach", an award-winning PowerSports Complex, racetracks, multiple stages, numerous bars, a variety of food services, a convenience store, a gas station, and a motorcycle product retail and installation facility. Throughout the years, several landmarks have also been erected on the property, including the iron "Welcome Home Biker" entrance gates, the World's Largest V-Twin Engine sculpture, Freedom Field, and an 8-ton buffalo sculpture with the letters "CHIP" cut out of its center 30' above Hwy 34 at the northwest corner of the Sturgis Buffalo Chip's property.

The Buffalo Chip made notable national television news coverage in 2008 when John McCain visited the Buffalo Chip Campground on his 2008 campaign trail. McCain joked that he wanted his wife to enter the Miss Buffalo Chip beauty contest held on the venue's main stage. In 2009 the Buffalo Chip made additional notable national news coverage when Aerosmith lead singer, Steven Tyler, fell off the stage.

The Sturgis Buffalo Chip built a 7,000 sq. ft. exhibition hall in 2009 to house its annual Motorcycles as Art Exhibit. This annual revolving exhibit has been curated by Michael Lichter. Exhibits have featured the works of multiple builders of custom motorcycles, the works of photographer Michael Lichter, himself, and sculptor Jeff Decker.

In 2012, the Sturgis Buffalo Chip built CrossRoads, an outdoor free-access venue at the western edge of the property, featuring the Big Engine Bar and stage, Field of Flags military tribute, and open space for vendors, bike washes, motorcycle shows, and numerous other motorcycle rally-related activities. The area has continued to grow and now incorporates The Buffalo Chip Garage, the Wall of Death, and more.

South Dakota Governor, Dennis Daugaard proclaimed Thursday, Aug. 11, 2011, as the official Buffalo Chip Campground Day in South Dakota. The proclamation was read from the Wolfman Jack Stage by ABC TV news anchorman, Bob Woodruff, present to participate in the Buffalo Chip's Military Tribute Day and raise awareness for the Bob Woodruff Foundation's mission to put action into the saying "Support Our Troops."

Robbie Knievel made motorcycle jumps at the Buffalo Chip.

In 2013, The Buffalo Chip introduced Daredevil Wednesday, which was broadcast on CMT, where Guinness Book of World Records officiates were on site to substantiate Toby Baker and Clint Ewing's rival head-to-head goal of bringing back the title of Longest Motorcycle Ride Through the Tunnel of Fire. Clint Ewing exited the tunnel wall, on fire, thus the attempt was not successful.

The Buffalo Chip hosted TORC: The Off-Road Championship at its PowerSports Complex in 2014 and 2015.

The Buffalo Chip TT held in the venue's amphitheater was part of the American Flat Track Circuit in 2017, 2018, and 2019.

The Buffalo Chip developed Camp Zero in 2018.

Other entertainment and activities that have occurred at the Buffalo Chip includes racing, fire dancers, ziplines, roller derby, machine gun shooting, midget bowling, comedians, and more.

In 2023, the Buffalo Chip introduced the Deathwire Daredevil Spectacular, where highwire walker Blake Wallenda sky walked across the Buffalo Chip Amphitheater while motorcycle stuntman Kyle Ives jumped over him on his motorcycle.

In 2024, as a part of Daredevil Wednesday, Blake Wallenda returned with a highwire walk, Shawn Ives broke through a wall of fire while riding atop of a limo, and a Monster Wall was smashed.

In 2025, as a part of the expanded Daredevil Wednesday and Thursday, Chuck Biddles broke the world record of the breaking through the most walls that are on fire, making it 22.

The Sturgis Buffalo Chip has been featured in multiple television specials on the Discovery, Travel Channel, Fox Sports Network, CMT, HISTORY, and NBC Sports. The venue has also been featured in Rolling Stone, The New York Times, Forbes, Billboard, Pollstar, who referred to the Buffalo Chip as "a Beacon of Freedom", CNN, Time, USA Today, and Fox TV who credited Rod Woodruff and the Buffalo Chip for saving the Sturgis Motorcycle Rally.

== Ownership and operation ==
The Buffalo Chip Campground was founded by Rod Woodruff. He remains the CEO. His son, Daymon Woodruff, serves as president. His daughter, Toni Woodruff, serves as the VP of Communication and Compliance. Carol, Rod's wife, manages the box office. Toni and Daymon's mother, Meri Remick, manages personnel and the bar.

Rod and his family run and prepare for each August music festival with the help of a small staff employed full-time year round. A few hundred seasonal employees help staff the grounds for the event.

== Charity support ==
The Buffalo Chip has and continues to support many charities. To date it has raised over $2.8 million for charity through its various endeavors.

Its most notable charitable efforts are The Legends Ride, The Biker Belles Ride, and the Rusty Wallace Ride. All three charity rides were founded and are promoted by the Buffalo Chip.

The annual Legends Ride features some of the celebrities that attend the Sturgis Buffalo Chip's events. Hundreds of thousands of dollars have been passed to local charities. Current beneficiaries are the Sturgis Motorcycle Museum and Hall of Fame and the Special Olympics South Dakota - Rapid City Flame.

The annual Biker Belles ride features and emphasizes women in motorcycling, though men are included in the ride. One hundred percent of riders' contributions are passed to three charities, the Sturgis Motorcycle Museum and Hall of Fame, the Jessi Combs Foundation, and Helping With Horsepower.

The Rusty Wallace Ride allows attendees to meet and ride alongside NASCAR racers including ride namesake Rusty Wallace. Funds raised by the event have benefitted charities including the NASCAR Foundation, All Kids Bike, and Special Olympics South Dakota – Rapid City Flame.

== Attempt at incorporation ==
In 2015, the geographic area on which the Buffalo Chip Campground resides attempted to incorporate as the Town of Buffalo Chip. The legality of the incorporation was challenged in court, an appeal was made to the South Dakota Supreme Court which, on January 25, 2018, ruled that only the state—and not another municipality—can challenge incorporation. The State of South Dakota brought that challenge to Meade County Court in summer 2018 and on November 12, 2020, the South Dakota Supreme Court ruled that Buffalo Chip's incorporation was unlawful and void, because the area does not contain the required 100 legal residents.

== Music performers ==
1982 – Susan Nelson, Johnny Paycheck, Foggy Notion Band

1983 – Foggy Notion Band, Kenny Miller Band, Burnt River Band

1984 – 69 Band, Burnt River Band, Foggy Notion, Bill Dawg Band, Z Band

1985 – 69 Band, Burnt River Band, Foggy Notion, Bill Dawg Band, Z Band

1986 – 69 Band, Burnt River Band, Foggy Notion, Group W

1987 – Canned Heat, Black Oak Arkansas, Mitch Ryder, Foggy Notion, Group W, Country Joe McDonald, Biker Joe Warren

1988 – Foggy Notion, Biker Joe Warren, Nick St. Nicholas & The Wolf, Hoyt Axton, Burnt River Band, Jerry Jeff Walker, The Kingsmen

1989 – Mitch Ryder, Iron Butterfly, The Kingsmen, Nick St. Nicholas & The Wolf, Hoyt Axton, Commander Cody and His Lost Planet Airmen, Foggy Notion, Burnt River Band, Bill Dawg & The Extraordinaires, The Backsliders

1990 – Bachman-Turner Overdrive, Marshall Tucker Band, Joe Walsh, Joan Jett, Tanya Tucker, Lita Ford, The Georgia Satellites, Robbie Krieger, Sam Kinison, Nighthawks, John Kay & Steppenwolf, Wolfman Jack, Eric Burdon, Foghat, Billy Gordon, Crow, The Backsliders, Little Caesar, Nick St. Nicholas, Bill Dawg Esquire

1991 – The Doobie Brothers, Kentucky Headhunters, The Marshall Tucker Band, John Kay & Steppenwolf, Charlie Daniels Band, Billy Gordon & The Blue Rockers

1992 – Stray Cats, Edgar Winter, Foghat, Arc Angels, Commander Cody, Tinsley Ellis, Paul Rodriguez, Savoy Brown

1993 – Foghat, Molly Hatchet, Jim Dandy, Delbert McClinton

1994 – Mötley Crüe, Great White, Blue Öyster Cult, Delbert McClinton, Confederate Railroad, Black Oak Arkansas, Zwarte

1995 – The Doobie Brothers, Iron Butterfly, Nancy Sinatra, Great White, Pat Travers Band, Mountain, Lee Hazlewood, Zwarte, Sunset Heights

1996 – Tim McGraw, John Kay & Steppenwolf, Eric Burdon, Big Brother and the Holding Company, Mitch Ryder, Carolyn Wonderland & The Imperial Monkeys

1997 – The Guess Who, The Marshall Tucker Band, Ted Nugent

1998 – Lynyrd Skynyrd, John Kay & Steppenwolf, Blue Öyster Cult, Pat Travers, Nazareth, Black Oak Arkansas, Winter Trout Band, Carolyn Wonderland, Squeeze Play, Dana Lyons

1999 – Def Leppard, Lynyrd Skynyrd, Montgomery Gentry, 38 Special, Jackyl, Paul Rodgers, Soulmotor, Burnt River Band, Zwarte, Section 30

2000 – Montgomery Gentry, Kenny Wayne Shepherd, Cheap Trick, Styx, REO Speedwagon, Jonny Lang, and Cher, Blue Öyster Cult, The Marshall Tucker Band, Dalton Adams

2001 – Sheryl Crow, The Allman Brothers Band, Grand Funk Railroad, Smash Mouth, Poison, Steppenwolf, Montgomery Gentry, Buddy Miles, Slaughter, Paul Revere & The Raiders, Roy Rogers & The Delta Rhythm Kings

2002 – Billy Idol, Smash Mouth, Foreigner, Blues Traveler, Poison, John Kay & Steppenwolf, The Guess Who, Cinderella, Paul Revere & the Raiders

2003 – Alice Cooper, Travis Tritt, Joe Bonamassa, Jethro Tull, Tesla, Our Lady Peace, 3 Doors Down, Blue Öyster Cult, Seether, Slaughter, Warrant, Kip Winger, Night Ranger, Whitesnake

2004 – ZZ Top, Heart, The Beach Boys, Kid Rock, Styx, George Thorogood & The Destroyers, Nickelback, Blue Öyster Cult, REO Speedwagon, Montgomery Gentry, Tantric

2005 – Journey, Shinedown, Tim McGraw, Steve Miller Band, Toby Keith, Creedence Clearwater Revisited, Dicky Betts, Disturbed, Queensrÿche, Twisted Sister, Dustin Evans, Keith Anderson

2006 – Billy Idol, Lynyrd Skynyrd, Foreigner, Kid Rock, Alice in Chains, Nickelback, George Thorogood, James Gang with Joe Walsh, Blue Öyster Cult, David Lee Roth, Montgomery Gentry, Buckcherry, Gretchen Wilson

2007 – ZZ Top, Toby Keith, Foreigner, Poison, Kenny Wayne Shepherd, Ratt, Buckcherry, Papa Roach, Velvet Revolver, Daughtry, Edgar Winter, Grand Funk Railroad, Seether

2008 – ZZ Top, Kid Rock, Lynyrd Skynyrd, Alice Cooper, Staind, Puddle of Mudd, Theory of a Deadman, Sugarland, Dierks Bentley, The Guess Who, Blind Melon, Fog Hat, 3 Doors Down, Saving Abel, Kellie Pickler, Finger Eleven, Mitch Ryder, Frankie Moreno

2009 – Aerosmith, Toby Keith, Billy Squier, George Thorogood, Tesla, Lita Ford, Creedence Clearwater Revisited, The Guess Who, Hinder, Buckcherry, Cheech & Chong, The Family Stone Project, Red, Larry McCray, Mark Famer

2010 – Bob Dylan, Ozzy Osbourne, ZZ Top, Mötley Crüe, Kid Rock, The Doobie Brothers, Credence Clearwater Revisited, Jason Aldean, Scorpions, The Guess Who, Buckcherry, Stone Sour, Guns N' Roses, Disturbed, Drowning Pool, Orianthi, Dave Mason, Williams and Ree

2011 – Def Leppard, Alice Cooper, Toby Keith, Gregg Allman, Stevie Nicks, Styx, George Thorogood, John Fogerty, Poison, Edgar Winter, Tesla, Bachman & Turner, Buckcherry, Puddle of Mudd, Pop Evil, Jeff Bridges, Lukas Nelson, Saving Abel, Williams and Ree

2012 – Lynyrd Skynyrd, Journey, Boston, Slash, Shinedown, Zac Brown Band, Sugarland, Sublime with Rome, Skid Row, Loverboy, Aaron Lewis, WAR, Candlebox, Saving Abel, Buckcherry, Adelitas Way, Lukas Nelson

2013 – Kid Rock, ZZ Top, Lynyrd Skynyrd, Toby Keith, The Doobie Brothers, Rob Zombie, Brantley Gilbert, The Cult, Sublime with Rome, Halestorm, Queensrÿche, Filter, Mastodon, Robbie Krieger, Buckcherry, TESLA, Fuel, Pop Evil, Alien Ant Farm, Machine Head, Madison Rising

2014 – Mötley Crüe, ZZ Top, Lynyrd Skynyrd, Zac Brown Band, Cheap Trick, Alice Cooper, Florida Georgia Line, Train, Collective Soul, The Cult, Queensrÿche, Loverboy, Buckcherry, The Pretty Reckless, Sevendust, Pop Evil, John Mayall

2015 – Def Leppard, Lynyrd Skynyrd, Alice Cooper, Godsmack, John Fogerty, Brantley Gilbert, Shinedown, Dee Snider, Five Finger Death Punch, Social Distortion, The Guess Who, 38 Special, WAR, Texas Hippie Coalition, Nazareth, Lukas Nelson & Promise of the Real

2016 – Miranda Lambert, Willie Nelson, Lynyrd Skynyrd, Kid Rock, Cheap Trick, Five Finger Death Punch, Weird Al Yankovic, 3 Doors Down, Buckcherry, Lita Ford, Elle King, Texas Hippie Coalition, Pop Evil, Ratt, Reverend Horton Heat, ONE: The Only Tribute to Metallica, and Drake White and the Big Fire.

2017 – Ozzy Osbourne, Blink-182, Shinedown, Lynyrd Skynyrd, The Doobie Brothers, Justin Moore, George Thorogood and the Destroyers, Blue Öyster Cult, Alter Bridge, Pop Evil, All That Remains, Blackberry Smoke, Ratt, Night Ranger, Drowning Pool, and Trapt

2018 – Kid Rock, Eric Church, Foreigner, Lynyrd Skynyrd, John Kay & Steppenwolf, Aaron Lewis, Theory of a Deadman, Chevelle, Phil Vassar, Queensrÿche, Pop Evil, Yelawolf, Red Sun Rising, The Marshall Tucker Band and Reverend Horton Heat

2019 – Keith Urban, Toby Keith, Disturbed, Snoop Dogg, Godsmack, Styx, Volbeat, George Thorogood and the Destroyers, Dee Snider, Theory of a Deadman, Collective Soul, Pop Evil, Zakk Sabbath, Skid Row, Red Fang, Reverend Horton Heat, The Supersuckers

2020 – Smash Mouth, Night Ranger, Buckcherry, Quiet Riot, Drowning Pool, The Guess Who, Molly Hatchet, Saving Abel, Trapt, Lit, Adelitas Way, Reverend Horton Heat

2021 – Kid Rock, ZZ Top, Clint Black, Shinedown, Stone Temple Pilots, Corey Taylor, REO Speedwagon, Anthrax, P.O.D., Puddle of Mudd, Black Label Society, Buckcherry, Black Stone Cherry, Drowning Pool, Matt Stell, From Ashes to New, Reverend Horton Heat, Blacklite District

2022 – Lynyrd Skynyrd, Rob Zombie, Jon Pardi, Travis Tritt, Papa Roach, Bush, Pop Evil, Lita Ford, Aaron Lewis & The Stateliners, Buckcherry, Puddle of Mudd, Falling in Reverse, Hollywood Undead, Bad Wolves, Quiet Riot, Back in Black, Blacklite District, Williams & Ree, Judd Hoos, Devon Worley Band, Big Skillet, Foundry

2023 – The Death Wire Daredevil Spectacular, Def Leppard, Lynyrd Skynyrd, Limp Bizkit, ZZ Top, Styx, REO Speedwagon, Koe Wetzel, Whiskey Myers, George Thorogood & The Destroyers, Buckcherry, Puddle of Mudd, Pop Evil, Lita Ford, Steel Panther, Tim Montana, Tommy Howell, Back in Black, Petty & The Heartshakers

2024 – Kid Rock, Jelly Roll, Aaron Lewis, Bret Michaels, Theory of a Deadman, Travis Tritt, Bad Wolves, Buckcherry, Dasha, Great White, Hinder, Quiet Riot, Big Skillet, Cody Lee Meece, Cordell Winter, Cory Marks, DJ Hulio, The Downboys, Goodfire, Leaving Hope, Mini Kiss, ThundHerStruck, Van Zeppelin, War Hippies

2025 – Nickelback, Jason Aldean, Five Finger Death Punch, Marilyn Manson, ZZ Top, Stone Temple Pilots, Bare Knuckle Fighting, Kiss’ Gene Simmons, Buckcherry, Hinder, Josh Ross, Saliva, Pop Evil, Citizen Soldier, ArenaCross, Ultra4 USA, Scotty Hasting, Peach Street Revival, Stil Runnin, Cordell Winter, Cody Lee Meece, Krysten Knievel, Goodfire, Big Skillet, Cönaxx, Van Zeppelin

2026 – Lainey Wilson, YUNGBLUD, Megadeth, Lynyrd Skynyrd, David Lee Roth, Halestorm, Skillet, P.O.D., Bare Knuckle Fighting, Buckcherry, Drowning Pool, Fuel, Hairball, The Iron Maidens, Ultra4 USA, New Damage, Cordell Winter, Cönaxx, Van Zeppelin, Devon Worley Band, STIL RUNNIN, Big Skillet, Jake Stringer, Rat Salad

== Education ==
It is in Meade School District 46-1.
