= Brigade (disambiguation) =

A brigade is a military unit.

Brigade may also refer to:

- Brigade (album), a 1990 album by Heart
- Brigade (band), an English rock band
- Brigade (comics), a comic book series published by Image Comics
- Brigade (Marvel Comics), a video game character in Marvel Nemesis: Rise of the Imperfects
- Brigade (pejorative), a mild term of collective contempt
- Brigade (Soviet collective farm), a labor-force division
- Brigade de cuisine, the hierarchy of the apprentice system in a professional kitchen
- The Brigade: Race to the Hudson, a 2019 American reality television series
- The Brigade, part of St. John Ambulance Canada
- The Brigade, modified name of the California band Youth Brigade (band), used from 1986 to 1987
- The Brigade, a 2007 novel by neo-Nazi Harold Covington
- "Brigade," a 2022 episode of the TV show The Bear

== Online ==
- Brigade Media, a former civic technology platform
- Brigading (or swarming), coordinated online harassment subject to Twitter suspensions
- Russian web brigades, teams using sockpuppets to promote pro-Putin and pro-Russian propaganda
- Vote brigading, coordinated online action to manipulate debate, reviews etc.

== See also ==
- Youth Brigade (disambiguation)
- Abdullah Azzam Brigades, Arab Sunni Islamist militant group affiliated with Al-Qaeda and the global jihad movement
- Church Lads' and Church Girls' Brigade, Church of England youth organisation with branches in the United Kingdom and many countries
- Fire brigade, British term for a fire department
- International Brigades, military units of foreigners in the Spanish Civil War
- Jewish Brigade, a Jewish Infantry Brigade Group of the British Army that served in Europe during the Second World War
- Kansas City Brigade, an Arena Football League team
- Baltimore Brigade, an Arena Football League team, unrelated to the aforementioned Kansas City team
- Red Brigades, Marxist–Leninist vanguard paramilitary organization, based in Italy
- Tank Brigade, a 1955 Czechoslovak film
- Brigade de cuisine, a hierarchical system of organization for kitchen staff
