= Lunkerville =

- Real People, Real Fish Stories
- Genre: Fishing
- Created by: Michael de Avila; Shannon Goldman
- Directed by: Michael de Avila; Shannon Goldman
- Starring: Michael de Avila
- Country of origin: United States
- Original language: English
- No. of seasons: 14
- No. of episodes: 182

Production
- Producers: Michael de Avila; Shannon Goldman
- Editors: Michael de Avila; Shannon Goldman
- Running time: 30 minutes
- Production companies: Rockville Pictures, Inc.

Original release
- Network: Sportsman Channel (2004-2007); Water Channel (2006); World Fishing Network (2008–present); NBC Sports Network (2012–2016)CBS Sports Network (2017–2020)Discovery Channel (2015–present)
- Release: April 2004 – present

Lunkerville is a television series dedicated to bass fishing enthusiasts across the US and Canada. The host, Michael de Avila, referred to on the show simply as "Mike D," travels around the country fishing with local experts learning their secrets for fishing in their favorite spots.

The show was created in 2004 by its host and independent filmmaker, Michael de Avila. In contrast to the many other shows in the genre that rely on a host-as-the-expert format, Lunkerville instead highlights everyday, recreational fishermen traveling to their own secret spots and sharing their techniques. Lunkerville was voted “Favorite Fishing Show” three years in a row by viewers of The Sportsman Channel and awarded a CINE Golden Eagle.

As of 2021, Lunkerville broadcasts on television on the Discovery Channel, the World Fishing Network, and can be streamed on Amazon Prime Video and FishingTV.
