= Michael de Avila =

American television personality

Michael de Avila (also known as Mike D) is an American television personality, filmmaker, and producer from New York, New York. He is the host of the fishing television show Lunkerville, which airs on the World Fishing Network. and NBC Sports Network.

Lunkerville is a CINE Golden Eagle award winner and Mike was chosen Viewer Favorite Host in 2004 by Sportsman Channel Viewers.

Mike D is also a filmmaker who has directed two feature-length dramatic films: the theatrically released "Lost Prophet" and the Sundance Channel premiere film "Burnzy's Last Call".
