= National Voter Registration Day =

Voter registration

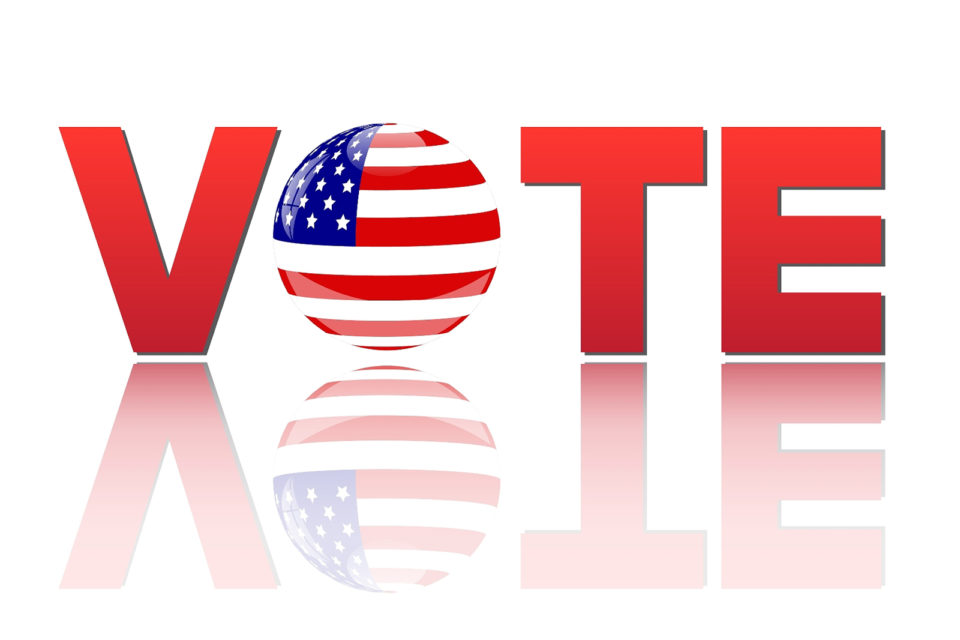
San Diego County News Center

National Voter Registration Day, observed on a Tuesday in September, is a nonpartisan civic holiday in the U.S. creating broad awareness of voter registration opportunities and celebrating democracy.

== Background ==
About 2000 civic organizations around the country, including League of Women Voters, Voto Latino, HeadCount, The Bus Federation (currently Alliance for Youth Organizing), Rock the Vote and Nonprofit VOTE helped launch the first National Voter Registration Day on September 25, 2012. Many celebrity actors and musicians added their voices to the thousands of volunteers to encourage voter registration.

By 2022, the National Association of Secretaries of State (NASS), the National Association of State Election Directors (NASED), the U.S. Election Assistance Commission (EAC), and the National Association of Election Officials (The Election Center) had endorsed National Voter Registration Day. National Voter Registration Day is also a program of Nonprofit VOTE. The program provides national communications support, sample graphics for social media posts, field organizing resources, logo merchandise, and a centralized organization to coordinate fundraising and volunteer efforts.

National Voter Registration Day has received several U.S. presidential proclamations and agreed by unanimous consent in the U.S. Senate.

== Ongoing Activities ==
Besides White House declarations, National Voter Registration Day received annual recognitions.

=== 2025 ===
In 2025, National Voter Registration Day is recognized for the 16th of September

=== 2024 ===
In 2024, National Voter Registration Day was proclaimed by Presidential proclamation to be recognized on the 17th of September |https://www.federalregister.gov/documents/2024/09/19/2024-21566/national-voter-registration-day-2024].

=== 2023 ===
In 2023, National Voter Registration Day was celebrated on the 19th of September.

Governor Josh Shapiro announced Tuesday that Pennsylvania has become the latest state to implement automatic voter registration. When a qualified citizen acquires a new or renewed drivers license or state ID, they will also be registered to vote.

On National Voter Registration Day 2023, the U.S. Department of Veterans Affairs and the office of the Michigan Secretary of State announced an agreement to designate three VA facilities as voter registration sites. This agreement will enable VA to provide voter registration information and assistance to Veterans and their families.

World renown singer Taylor Swift leveraged her celebrity status to promote voter registration. It was estimated that she influenced 35,000 people to register to vote.

The North Carolina State Board of Elections utilized National Voter Registration Day as an occasion to communicate methods for voting registration within North Carolina through a press release. Other government organizations promote the day to inform citizens of recent changes to voting registration laws including Minneapolis, Croton-on-Hudson, Oregon, and Citizens Clean Elections Commission. California television station KSBW shared information on how qualifying citizens could register to vote. Stations Fox News, KTTC, WNDU, WEVV, WIBW, WEAU, CBS, KXAN, Fox 5 Atlanta, ABC27, KXLY, 13NEWSNOW, WIFR, WVNS, KDRV, NBC Right Now, KBMT, WFAA, KKTV, WJHG, KQTV, KVLY, WBRC FOX6, WTMJ, KENS5, NEWSCHANNEL6, WGRZ, WWSB, FOX2Now, 2news, PHL17, WXII, WNEM, ABC57, FOX19, WKYT, Eagle Country 99.3, WIProud, Local3News, KAAL, KSTP, WUSF, CBS19, NBC29, Click2Houston, PBS and news publishers Wisconsin Examiner, Milwaukee Journal Sentinel, Idaho Capital Sun, NewsPressNow, Kentucky Today reported on National Voter Registration Day. Universities, associations, libraries, civic groups, businesses, churches, and other organizations including Johns Hopkins University, National Association of Secretaries of State, United Church of Christ, League of Women Voters, Boston Public Library, LinkedIn, Civic Nebraska, NETWORK Lobby for Catholic Social Justice, Texas College, NAACP, and Alachua County Library District supported the civic holiday.

=== 2024 ===
In 2024, National Voter Registration Day was celebrated on September 17.

=== 2025 ===
National Voter Registration Day 2025 has been scheduled for September 16.

== Individual Supporters ==
Since 2012, the following people provided their support of National Voter Registration Day through personal appearances, social media posts, and other means.

=== Actors, Entertainers and Notable Figures ===
Amy Schumer, Aron Ralston, Aubrey Plaza, Aziz Ansari, Barry Sobel, Blythe Danner, Bobby Slayton, Craig Ferguson, Craig Newmark, David Cross, David Wain, Demetri Martin, Doug Benson, Ed Asner, Edward Norton, Eva Amurri Martino, Frances Fisher, Gary Gulman, Gary Owen, George Lopez, Jason Biggs, Jeff Garlin, Jeffrey Gurian, Jen Kirkman, Jennifer Aniston, Jenny Mollen, Jim Gaffigan, Jim Norton, Jimmi Simpson, Jon Stewart, Laurie Holden, Lewis Black, Lisa Lampanelli, Malin Akerman, Margaret Cho, Marlon Wayans, Matt Walsh, Michael Ian Black, Mike Vecchione, Norman Reedus, Patton Oswalt, Paul Tompkins, Rob Delaney, Rob Huebel, Rosario Dawson, Roseanne Barr, Sarah Silverman, Serinda Swan, Shay Mitchell, Stephen Colbert, Steven Wright, Steve-O, Susan Sarandon, Ted Alexandro, Tenacious D (Jack Black), Tim Heidecker, Todd Barry, W. Kamau Bell and cast and writers of Totally Biased, Wavy Gravy, Wendy Malick.

=== Musicians ===
3Oh3!, 50 Cent, A Loss For Words, Aloe Blacc, Amanda Palmer, Anders Osborne, Andrew Bird, Ani DiFranco, Antibalas, B-52s, Ballyhoo!, Bassnectar, B.B. King, Big Boi, Big Gigantic, Billie Eilish, Blind Pilot, Blitzen Trapper, Bob Weir, Bonnie Raitt, Brandi Carlile, Brown Birds, CAKE, Calexico, Common (rapper), Cyndi Lauper, Dave Matthews, Dawes, Death Cab for Cutie, Delta Spirit, Derek Trucks and Susan Tedeschi, Dispatch, Dr. Dog, Elephant Revival, Eve 6, Fitz and the Tantrums, Flobots, fun, G. Love, Galactic, Girl Talk, Grace Potter, Greensky Bluegrass, Grizzly Bear, Guster, Herbie Hancock, Ivan Neville, Jackson Browne, Jason Mraz, Joe Russo, John Legend, John Mayer, Jonathan Wilson, Ke$ha, Keller Williams, Lady Gaga, Linkin Park, Madison Rising, Matt and Kim, Matt Butler (Everyone Orchestra), Metric, Michael Franti and Spearhead, Miike Snow, moe, My Morning Jacket, New Mastersounds, O.A.R., OK Go!, Patterson Hood (Drive-By-Truckers), Phish, Portugal The Man, Primus, Revivalists, Rise Against, Robert Ellis, Rubblebucket, Russ Irwin (Aerosmith), Santigold, Sharon Jones, Slightly Stoopid, SOJA, Soulive, Spirit Family Reunion, St. Vincent, Steel Pulse, String Cheese Incident, STS9, Takka Takka, Taylor Swift, Tenacious D, Thao and the Get Down Stay Down, The Disco Biscuits, The Head and the Heart, The Lee Boys, Punch Brothers, The Walkmen, Trampled by Turtles, tUnE-yArDs, TV on the Radio, Umphrey’s McGee, Vernon Reid, War on Drugs, Warren Haynes (Allman Brothers Band, Gov’t Mule), Weird Al Yankovic, Widespread Panic, Wilco, Will Johnson (Centro-matic), Yacht, Yellow Ostrich, Zola Jesus.

== Graphics Examples ==
American Library Association NVRD
