= Zveno (disambiguation) =

Zveno may refer to:

- Zveno, a Bulgarian military and political organization
- Zveno (Soviet collective farming), a Soviet agricultural working unit
- Zveno (art), a Ukrainian group of artists
- Zveno project, a Soviet parasite fighter
- Zveno, a sub-sub-unit of the "Young Pioneers" (Vladimir Lenin All-Union Pioneer Organization)
