= Joe Veillette =

Luthier

- Born: March 13, 1946 (age 80); Brooklyn, New York
- Occupation: Luthier
- Website: http://www.veilletteguitars.com/

Joe Veillette (born March 13, 1946), is a luthier and the owner of Veillette Guitars. He specializes in the crafting of unusual and innovative handmade guitars, basses, and other stringed instruments.

== Early life ==
Veillette is originally from Brooklyn, New York. He earned a Bachelor of Architecture degree at City College of New York, and was subsequently employed as an architectural designer on Park Avenue.

== "Woodstock Music Products" and "Veillette Guitars" ==
He took a class in guitar-making, taught by luthier Michael Gurian in 1971, to learn how to repair the broken headstock on his Gibson J-45. He became interested in guitar building and teamed up with fellow architectural student Harvey Citron, and formed Veillette-Citron in 1976. Veillette-Citron collaborated with John Sebastian to develop and market the first production baritone guitar. Veillette-Citron pioneered neck-thru-body construction, made innovations in instrument electronics, and set new trends in modern electric bass design. Early Veillete-Citron instruments are rare and highly sought after as a result of their excellence in craftsmanship and innovative designs. The company moved from Brooklyn to Kingston NY in 1976. The partnership lasted until 1983.

Veillette formed Woodstock Music Products in 1991, in partnership with bass-maker Stuart Spector. One of Veillette's innovations developed during the partnership was the Deep-6 neck, which allowed a baritone conversion for Fender-style instruments. Veillette, in conjunction with bass-maker Michael Tobias, developed the Avante line of instruments for Alvarez. The Veillette/Spector partnership ended in 1994.

Veillette then established Veillette Guitars, in Woodstock NY. He has focused on making unusual instruments, rather than trying to compete in a saturated market of OEM clone-makers. One of his most notable guitars is the Gryphon - a short (18.5.1”) scale 12 string guitar tuned D-D in unison courses, almost a full octave above standard tuning. This instrument can be played to sound like a mandolin, bouzouki, cuatro, and other traditional folk instruments. Veillette licensed production of his acoustic Gryphon model as a high quality import from Korea, and revived the Avante name to market this instrument as well as versions of the acoustic baritone 6 and 12 string he is also known for.
