= Ultimate Match Fishing =

- Genre: Sports
- Starring: Joe Thomas, Fish Fishburne
- Country of origin: United States

Production
- Running time: 30 minutes

Original release
- Network: Outdoor Channel
- Release: July 4, 2005 – present

Ultimate Match Fishing is a sport fishing television series airing on the Outdoor Channel since 2005. It is hosted by Joe Thomas. While Mark Randolph was the referee. It has successfully completed 14 seasons and 15th is currently in on air.
