= Brigadier (disambiguation) =

Brigadier is a military rank in many countries.

Brigadier or The Brigadier may also refer to:

- Brigadier general, a military rank
- Brigadier Lethbridge-Stewart, a fictional character in the television series Doctor Who
- GMC Brigadier, a series of heavy-duty trucks
- ST Brigadier, originally Empire Frank, a tug in service with Steel & Bennie Ltd, 1946-1960
- The Brigadier (newspaper), a student newspaper at The Citadel, Charleston, South Carolina, US
- The Brigadier (painting), a 2004 portrait of Andrew Parker Bowles by Lucian Freud

== See also ==
- Brigade (disambiguation)
