= Outdoor Sportsman Group =

Media company with an outdoors focus

Outdoor Sportsman Group, Inc. (a.k.a. Outdoor Sportsman), a subsidiary of Kroenke Sports & Entertainment (KSE), is an outdoors media group in the United States. They publish 19 hunting, fishing and shooting magazines, and own the Sportsman & Outdoor Channels, and World Fishing Network specialty channels, as well as the MyOutdoorTV.com internet TV network, and 19.9% of the Canadian Sportsman Channel having purchased the Sportsman Channel from its founders in June 2007. In 2014, KSE acquired Outdoor Sportsman Group (then known as InterMedia Outdoor Holdings) from InterMedia Partners. InterMedia acquired the magazines from Primedia (now Rent Group) in 2006.

In addition to traditional magazine publishing, Outdoor Sportsman Group is also involved with 11 top-rated TV series, syndicated radio, consumer events, and brand-driven merchandising businesses.

Mike Carney was named president and CEO of the company in April 2024.

== Publications ==
- Bass Fan
- Bowhunter
- Firearms News
- Florida Sportsman
- Fly Fisherman
- Game & Fish
- Gun Dog
- Guns & Ammo
- Guns & Ammo: Handguns
- In-Fisherman
- North American Whitetail
- Petersen's Bowhunting
- Petersen's Hunting
- Rifle Shooter
- Shallow Water Angler
- Shooting Times
- Walleye In-Sider
- Wildfowl

== TV Networks ==
- Sportsman Channel (US & Canada (19.9%))
- Outdoor Channel
- World Fishing Network
- MyOutdoorTV.com (internet-based)
