= Lost Prophet =

- Promotional film poster
- Directed by: Michael de Avila
- Screenplay by: Michael de Avila; Shannon Goldman; Drew Morone; Lawrence O'Neil
- Produced by: Michael de Avila
- Starring: James Burton; Zandra Huston; Drew Morone; James Tucker
- Cinematography: Michael De Avila
- Edited by: Michael De Avila
- Music by: Michael De Avila
- Production company: Rockville Pictures Inc.
- Distributed by: JFiveOne Films
- Release date: June 8, 1992 (New York City)
- Running time: 75 minutes
- Country: United States
- Language: English

Lost Prophet (alternately titled: The Lost Prophet) is a 1992 American experimental horror film directed by Michael de Avila and starring James Burton, Zandra Huston, Drew Morone and James Tucker.

== Plot ==
An unstable man named Jim (James Burton) spends the summer in an empty mansion. There he meets a mystical woman (Zandra Huston), a real estate agent, and a man called Mick Prophet (Drew Morone). Over the course of time, a series of strange and disturbing events occur as punks, serial killers and witches cross his path

== Cast ==
- James Burton as Jim
- Zandra Huston as Kym
- Drew Morone as Real Estate Agent/Mick Prophet
- James Tucker as Kid
- Steven Tucker as Kid's Brother
- Shannon Goldman as Park Patrolman
- Larry O'Neil as Punk No. 1
- Christian Urich as Punk No. 2
- Sophia Ramos as Punk No. 3

== Production ==
Lost Prophet was produced, edited, and directed by Michael de Avila, who co-wrote it with production designer and later filmmaker Lawrence O'Neil. Filming took place in Lake George, New York.

== Release ==
=== Home media ===
Lost Prophet was released on Blu-ray July 1, 2024. Produced by Vinegar Syndrome partner label, VHShitfest, the release contains a 4k transfer from the original 16 mm film camera negative, and new interviews with de Avila and Burton.

== Reception ==
Upon its release, Lost Prophet received limited reviews from mainstream critics, with the few reviews that exist being mixed to positive. Stephen Holden of The New York Times commended the film for its atmosphere, and cinematography, further praising the film for "evoking childhood memories of feeling alone in a strange old house where unnameable dangers lurk in every shadow and behind every creaking door."

While commending the film for its use of imagery, Lawrence Cohn of Variety criticized it for lacking a sufficient narrative or explanation to sustain any interest, also criticizing the performances as "unimpressive".

== Bibliography ==
- Cinematographers, Production Designers, Costume Designers & Film Editors Guide (7th ed.). Lone Eagle. 1999. ISBN 978-1-58065-017-5.
- Roberts, Jerry (June 5, 2009). Encyclopedia of Television Film Directors. Scarecrow Press. ISBN 978-0-8108-6378-1 – via Google Books.
- Weldon, Michael (1996). The Psychotronic Video Guide To Film. Macmillan. ISBN 978-0-3121-3149-4 – via Google Books.
- Young, R.G. (2000). The Encyclopedia of Fantastic Film: Ali Baba to Zombies. Hal Leonard Corporation. ISBN 978-1-5578-3269-6 – via Google Books.
