= InterMedia Partners =

American private equity investment firm

InterMedia Advisors LLC
- Type: Private
- Industry: Private equity
- Founded: 1988; 38 years ago
- Founder: Leo Hindery
- Headquarters: 48th floor on the Chrysler Building; New York, New York, United States
- Key people: Tom Daschle, Alan Sokol
- Products: Leveraged buyout, Growth capital
- Total assets: $1 billion
- Website: www.intermediaadvisors.com

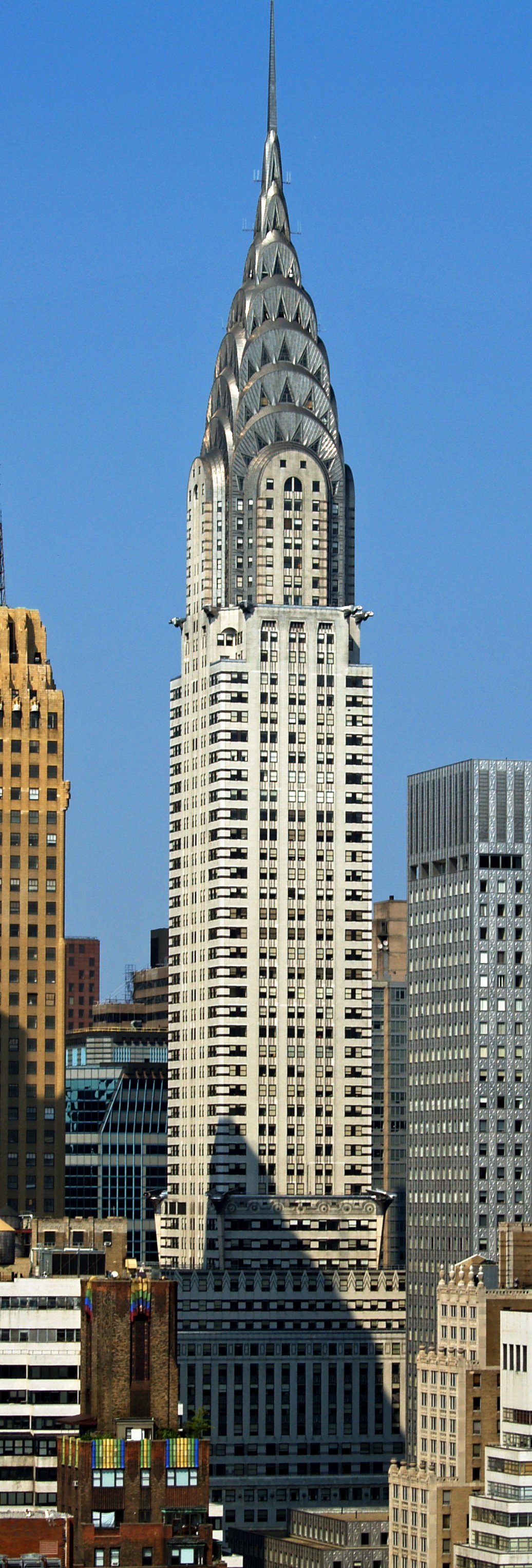
The Chrysler Building, the location of the headquarters

InterMedia Advisors, LLC (a..k.a. InterMedia Partners), is a private equity investment firm focused on leveraged buyout and growth capital investments in the media sector.

The firm, which was founded in 1988 by notable private equity investor Leo Hindery, is based on the 48th floor of the Chrysler Building in Midtown Manhattan, New York City.

Until 1996, the firm's most notable investments were through its InterMedia Outdoor Holdings media company subsidiary which included Thomas Nelson, Hemisphere Media Group, NBCUniversal, Universal Sports, Control Room, Aspire, BlackBook Media, @Home Network, Sportsman Channel, Soul Train Holdings, Vibe Lifestyle Network, Up, Cinelatino, Pececitas, Comedias TV, Azteca Latino, Sudamerica Television, Pasiones, Televisión Dominicana, Telemicro Internacional, Pantallazo, MegaMix TV, TVN Internacional, Ecuadorvision, CentroAmerica TV, WAPA América, and Puerto Rican station WAPA-TV. The firm sold the division to Kroenke Sports & Entertainment which renamed the company Outdoor Sportsman Group.

== Tom Daschle ==
In 2005, former U.S. Senator Tom Daschle joined the firm as a senior adviser. It was during his time at InterMedia that Daschle reportedly had the use of a limousine and chauffeur that he did not report in his income taxes.

== Sources ==
- Forbes Faces: Leo Hindery. Forbes, October 12, 2000
