= Ole Alcumbrac =

Wildlife veterinarian and television host

Dr. Ole Alcumbrac, DMV is a wildlife veterinarian known for hosting The Wild Life of Dr. Ole on Nat Geo Wild and Wild Ops on The Outdoor Channel. He is recipient of an Emmy Award (from the National Academy of Television Arts and Sciences, Rocky Mountain Southwest Chapter) for his production and hosting work on The Jaguar Project.

== Veterinary and wildlife conservation work ==
Since 1994, Alcumbrac has owned and operated White Mountain Animal Hospital, a mixed animal and exotic practice in northern Arizona, providing treatment to any animal that comes through the door. The practice has overseen several zoological operations, including patients from the prestigious Arizona Sonora Desert Museum, the Phoenix Zoo, and Bearizona Wildlife Park. Alcumbrac is a recipient of the Award of Excellence from the Arizona Game and Fish Commission. He also serves as an adjunct faculty member at Texas Tech University where he teaches formal classes and practicals internationally on wildlife capture; he previously taught at Northland Pioneer College, where he was an instructor of Veterinary Sciences.

== Personal Information ==
Ole was born and raised in Phoenix, AZ into a family of 6, with 2 sisters and 1 brother. He attended Arizona State University where he was president of the pre-veterinary club as well as Colorado State University where he earned his Doctor of Veterinary Medicine degree. Dr. Ole began his career as a kennel assistant, and over the course of 25 years has consulted with the California Condors and Black Footed Ferret Program and dedicated time to disease research for Desert Bighorn Sheep.

== Television ==
In 2021 Alcumbrac starred in Nat Geo Wild's, The Wild Life of Dr. Ole. He also has television experience from 2019 as the host of the Outdoor Channel original series Wild Ops. He has also made several appearances in Arizona Game and Fish Department's Wildlife Views.
