= On Your Own Adventures =

- Logo of the On Your Own Adventures TV Show
- Created by: Randy Newberg and Marc Pierce
- Country of origin: United States
- No. of seasons: 1
- No. of episodes: 13 (Not all have aired)

Production
- Running time: 22 minutes

Original release
- Network: Outdoor Channel
- Release: July 3, 2009 – present

On Your Own Adventures is a hunting television show in the United States produced by Randy Newberg and Will Holmes in conjunction with Warm Springs Productions and Outdoor Channel. The show airs on Outdoor Channel and CarbonTV and documents the non-guided hunting adventures of Randy Newberg and his circle of non-guided hunting friends. The show host is Marc Pierce, former host of Ducks Unlimited TV and Escape to the Wild.

== Background ==
On Your Own Adventures is based in Bozeman, Montana. All production is completed at Warm Springs Productions in Montana or Colorado. Videographers for all episodes are Troy Batzler and Loren Moulton.

The first season of "On Your Own Adventures" was filmed in 2008 and aired starting July, 2009. All episodes are based in the United States, with most of them on public lands in the Western United States. The first season has 12 episodes, in locations including Montana, Colorado, New Mexico, and Iowa. Species hunted are elk, mule deer, whitetail deer, antelope, bear, and turkey.

== Format ==
On Your Own Adventures is the first live coverage hunting TV show that documents non-guided hunting. It focuses on fair chase hunting without guides or outfitters on land accessible to all hunters. No other outdoor TV show has focused exclusively on the non-guided hunter, who represents 97% of big game hunters in the United States. All episodes require that hunters demonstrate ethical hunting, and are designed to articulate the three main conflicts of hunting: man versus man, man versus nature, and man versus himself. Camping is a common theme of all episodes; hunters sleep in tents, cook their own meals, build their own fires, and provide for themselves.

== Production ==
All episodes consist of two videographers on every hunt. Cameras used are the Canon XH-A1 and XL-H1S, and point of view shots are taken with Canon VIXIA HG-21. Audio is captured via wireless mics and shotgun mics for natural sound. All hunters are wired with multiple mics.

Hunting is often stopped for interviews of hunters to "capture the moment." Extensive interviewing of all participants is conducted, to gather the perspective of hunting as it occurs for average Americans, and gain perspective of how hunters view their activities in the larger context of wildlife conservation.

Production is finalized by Warm Springs Production. Production coordinator is Nathan Charlan. Editors are Greg Davis and Lin Brummett.

== Production Company ==
Warm Springs Production company was founded in 2007. It is owned by Marc Pierce and Chris Richardson and is based in Missoula, MT. Warm Springs produces outdoor entertainment for all sporting networks. Current productions are OYOA and the Duck Commander series airing on Outdoor Channel, Benelli on Assignment airing on Versus Network, and the Buck Commander airing on ESPN. The editing supervisor Greg Davis, the senior editor is Lin Brummet, the supervising producer is Nathan Charlan, and the associate producer is Bridger Pierce.

== Hosts ==
On Your Own Adventures has two main hosts. The field host is Randy Newberg and the studio host is Marc Pierce.

=== Randy Newberg ===
Randy was raised hunting and fishing in Big Falls, MN. He moved to Bozeman, MT in 1991, where he continued his outdoor activities. He still lives there with his wife, Kimberly, and son, Matthew. He is an accountant at Guza, Newberg, & Hubley. Randy was the Chairman of the Gallatin-Madison chapter of Ducks Unlimited for five years, has served on the board of directors of Orion The Hunter’s Institute, since 1995, served as president from 1998 to 2003, and has been the treasurer from 2003 to the present.

=== Marc Pierce ===
Marc grew up in Illinois and lived in Manhattan, MT for 30 years. He is the owner of Big Sky Carvers, also in Manhattan, MT. He lives with his wife Sherrie and their four children. Marc was the television host of Ducks Unlimited TV for 10 years. He was also the host of Escape to the Wild television show for two years. Marc serves on the board of directors of Ducks Unlimited and the Theodore Roosevelt Conservation Partnership.

== Episodes ==
=== Episode 1 – Elk Hunting on the Big Horn National Forest of Wyoming ===
Randy Newberg and his uncle Larry Sticker hunt public land in pursuit of elk in October 2008. One elk is harvested, at which time a blizzard chases the pair to lower country. There they hunt forty acres of BLM ground for 5 days, watching for elk crossing from private land. In spite of their efforts the extreme conditions prevail and no other elk is taken.

=== Episode 2 – New Mexico Archery Elk ===
Randy and friends Scott Jones and Joe Sehulster archery hunt on the Gila National Forest. They are joined by friends Jerry Pritchard and Wade Zarlingo, who are not hunting. This public land hunt occurs in late September 2008. On the fifth day of the hunt, Joe harvests a nice elk, later that evening, Randy also harvests an elk. Scott spends much of his season helping his fellow hunters pack out their elk, and ends his season without an animal of his own, but with memories of the hunt.

=== Episode 3 - New Mexico Pronghorn Antelope ===
Randy and his uncle Larry Stickler head to New Mexico chasing pronghorn near the Very Large Array in early October 2008. They scouted the area for two days and then harvested an antelope on New Mexico State Trust Land during the first day of hunting.

=== Episode 4 - Colorado Mule Deer ===
Randy hunts mule deer in the Rocky Mountains.
