= Firearms News =

- Categories: Shooting sports
- Frequency: Thrice-Monthly
- Circulation: 71,833
- Founded: 1946
- Company: Outdoor Sportsman Group
- Country: United States
- Language: English
- Website: www.firearmsnews.com
- ISSN: 0049-0415

Firearms News, formerly Shotgun News, is an American shooting and firearms interest publication owned by Outdoor Sportsman Group. The magazine was called Shotgun News until December 2015.

== History and profile ==
Shotgun News was established in 1946. By page count, the magazine consists predominantly of advertisements, similar to fashion magazines such as Vogue. Generally speaking, Shotgun News' format contains a featured review, a historical or handgun-related article, an article on amateur gunsmithing, and columns by Clayton Cramer, Chris Knox, Jeff Knox, and Vin Suprynowicz. Classified ads are also accepted, and unsold space is filled with historical quotations by the Founders.

"Fred," founder of Project Appleseed, whose real name is Jack Dailey, has been writing a column—actually a portion of ad space for Fred's M14 Stocks—since 1999.

There are 36 issues of Shotgun News published annually. Nominally the issues are printed in black-and-white on newsprint-quality paper. Every year, issues 3, 9, 12, 21, 27, and 33 also contain a full-color cover, a section of glossy color pages, and additional feature articles.

In December 2015 the magazine was renamed as Firearms News.

== Contributors ==
Field editors include Reid Coffield, David Fortier, James Grant, Tom Gaylord, Frank James, and Paul Scarlata. Regular columnists include Clayton Cramer, Chris Knox, Jeff Knox, and Vin Suprynowicz. Master armorer Peter G. Kokalis was also a regular contributor.

== External resources ==
- Official Website
