= Extreme Angler TV =

Canadian TV documentary series

Extreme Angler TV is a Canadian HD documentary series. It educates viewers about high-impact fishing and shows techniques of hardcore fishing using fast-paced editing and unique camera angles. It is hosted by Karl Kalonka. Extreme Angler is produced by Extreme Angler Media, Inc., and distributed by Picture Box Distribution. It airs on WFN.

== Production company ==
Extreme Angler Media, Inc. is the company that makes Extreme Angler Television. It also publishes a magazine called Extreme Angler Annual and publishes DVDs.
