= Burnzy's Last Call =

- Directed by: Michael de Avila
- Screenplay by: George Gilmore
- Story by: Michael de Avila
- Produced by: Michael de Avila
- Starring: Sherry Stringfield; Jamie Walters; Carolyn McCormick
- Cinematography: Scott St. John
- Edited by: Shannon Goldman
- Music by: Crispin Cioe
- Production company: Rockville Pictures Inc.
- Release date: 1995
- Running time: 85 minutes
- Country: United States
- Language: English

Burnzy's Last Call is a 1995 American comedy-drama film directed by Michael de Avila and starring Sherry Stringfield, Jamie Walters and Carolyn McCormick.

== Cast ==
- Sam Gray as "Burnzy" Burns
- David Johansen as Andre
- James McCaffrey as Sal
- Carolyn McCormick as Danielle
- Chris Noth as Kevin
- Michael Rispoli as Chris, The Cop
- Roger Robinson as Russell
- Sherry Stringfield as Jackie
- Tony Todd as Mistress Marla
- Jamie Walters as Shannon
- Michael Massee as Luke
- Eddie Brill as Eugene
