= Sportsman Channel (Canadian TV channel) =

- Country: Canada
- Broadcast area: National
- Headquarters: Vancouver, British Columbia

Programming
- Picture format: 480i (SDTV); 1080i (HDTV)

Ownership
- Owner: Keywest Marketing (80.1%); Outdoor Sportsman Group (Kroenke Sports and Entertainment) (19.9%)

History
- Launched: December 2, 2005
- Former names: World Fishing Network (2005-2019)

Links
- Website: sportsmancanada.ca

Sportsman Channel is a Canadian English language Category B specialty channel owned by Keywest Marketing Ltd. and the Outdoor Sportsman Group subsidiary of Kroenke Sports and Entertainment. It primarily airs informative programming that showcases outdoor lifestyle & adventure, hunting and fishing.

== History ==
In April 2005, Insight Sports, through its subsidiary Global Fishing Network Ltd., was granted approval by the Canadian Radio-television and Telecommunications Commission (CRTC) to launch a channel called Global Fishing Network, described as "a national English-language Category 2 specialty programming undertaking devoted to fishing and fishing enthusiasts."

The channel was launched on December 2, 2005 as World Fishing Network in standard definition on Rogers Cable.

In November 2007, World Fishing Network first launched internationally in the United States on Verizon FiOS. A few months later, the channel launched its first high definition channel, in the United States, on Dish Network. The Canadian channel launched its HD feed on September 2, 2010 on Rogers Cable. Despite the many firsts with Rogers Cable, the distributor dropped both the SD and HD channels on June 1, 2017.

Since the channel's initial launch internationally in the United States, the American feed had also launched with several other American television providers such as Charter Communications, and television providers in the Caribbean, including Flow Cable in Jamaica. The American channel's affiliation with the Canadian channel has since been discontinued when, after Insight Sports sold a 50% stake in the American operations to Altitude Sports and Entertainment (ASE) in January 2011, Insight Sports sold its remaining interest in the channel to ASE's parent company Kroenke Sports Enterprises, in July 2015. However, ASE took a 19.9% interest in the Canadian channel through its division Altitude WFN ULC in 2011.

On January 19, 2017, the CRTC approved the sale of Insight Sports' interest in the Canadian channel to Keywest Marketing Ltd., a company with assets in both publishing and television productions relating to hunting and fishing, among others. The sale of the channel to Keywest Marketing marked Insight Sports' exit from the broadcasting industry, after selling off or shuttering its previous broadcasting assets, including GameTV and NHL Network Canada.

On January 14, 2019, World Fishing Network in Canada officially relaunched as Sportsman Channel.

== See also ==
- World Fishing Network
- Sportsman Channel
