= Amazing America with Sarah Palin =

- Starring: Sarah Palin
- Opening theme: "Amazing America" by Madison Rising
- Country of origin: United States
- Original language: English
- No. of seasons: 2
- No. of episodes: 16

Production
- Running time: 43 minutes

Original release
- Network: Sportsman Channel
- Release: April 4, 2014 – February 12, 2015

Amazing America with Sarah Palin is an outdoors-themed reality television series starring Sarah Palin. Co-hosts for the first season included Jerry Carroll and actor Mark Christopher Lawrence. The show is produced by Pilgrim Films and Television. The Sportsman Channel, which aired Amazing America, bought twelve episodes for the first and second seasons. The channel said that the show had "triple-digit year-over-year growth in households and key demographics" and renewed it for 2015. The second season premiered on January 15, 2015 and wrapped up with the fifth episode on February 12.
