= Pasiones (TV channel) =

American Spanish-language television channel

- Country: United States
- Broadcast area: Latin America; United States; Canada
- Headquarters: Miami, Florida

Programming
- Language: Spanish
- Picture format: 480i (SDTV)

Ownership
- Owner: Hemisphere Media Group (InterMedia Partners, 99.9%)
- Sister channels: WAPA-TV; Cinelatino; Centroamérica TV; WAPA América; Ecuadorvisión; TVN Internacional; Televisión Dominicana; Telemicro Internacional; Azteca Latino; Sudamérica Televisión; Pececitas; Comedias TV; Pantallazo; MegaMix TV

History
- Launched: July 1, 2008 (18 years ago)
- Former names: Pasiones TV (2008–2015)

Links
- Website: tvpasiones.com

Availability

Streaming media
- FuboTV: IPTV
- Sling TV: IPTV
- Vidgo: IPTV
- YouTube TV: IPTV

Pasiones is an American pay television channel owned by Florida-based Hemisphere Media Group (99.9% owned by InterMedia Partners) which was launched on July 1, 2008. The channel airs Spanish-language and dubbed telenovelas and series 24 hours a day.

== Operating channels ==
- Pasiones USA - Available in the mainland United States, Puerto Rico and Canada.
- Pasiones Latin America - Available in Argentina, Bolivia, Central America, Chile, Colombia, Cuba, Dominican Republic, Ecuador, Mexico, Paraguay, Peru, Spain, Uruguay and Venezuela.
