= Kroenke Sports & Entertainment =

American sports and entertainment company

- Type: Private
- Industry: Professional sports; property management; entertainment
- Founded: 1999; 27 years ago
- Founder: Stan Kroenke
- Headquarters: Denver, Colorado, U.S.
- Key people: Stan Kroenke; Ann Walton Kroenke; Josh Kroenke
- Products: Sports teams Los Angeles Rams; Denver Nuggets; Colorado Avalanche; Colorado Rapids; Colorado Mammoth; Arsenal F.C. Arsenal W.F.C. Real estate SoFi Stadium; YouTube Theater; Rams Village at Warner Center; Emirates Stadium; Arsenal Training Centre; Highbury Square; Ball Arena; Dick's Sporting Goods Park; Paramount Theatre; 1stBank Center; Elitch Gardens Theme Park; Media; Altitude Sports and Entertainment; Outdoor Sportsman Group; Skycam

Kroenke Sports and Entertainment is an American sports and entertainment holding company based in Denver. Originally known as Kroenke Sports Enterprises, it was started in 1999 by businessman Stan Kroenke as the parent company of his sports holdings. Today, the company has control of five American professional sport franchises, an English football club (with two teams), four stadiums, two professional esports franchised teams, four television channels, an internet TV channel, 19 magazines which operate under the badge Outdoor Sportsman Group, four radio stations which operate under the badge KSE Radio Ventures, LLC, and Elitch Gardens Theme Park, an amusement park in downtown Denver.

== History ==
=== Sports teams ===
In 1995, KSE bought a stake in the National Football League's St. Louis Rams and Stan Kroenke became the team's vice-chairman. In 2000, KSE became full owner of both the National Basketball Association's Denver Nuggets and the National Hockey League's Colorado Avalanche, purchasing the teams from Charlie Lyons' Ascent Entertainment Group. In 2002, KSE partnered with Denver Broncos owner Pat Bowlen and former Bronco quarterback John Elway to become part-owners of the Arena Football League's Colorado Crush. KSE continued to acquire sports teams purchasing the National Lacrosse League's Colorado Mammoth in 2002 and Major League Soccer's Colorado Rapids from Phil Anschutz in 2003. From 2002 to 2006, KSE owned the Grand Prix of Denver.

In 2010, KSE exercised its right of first refusal to buy the remaining interest in the Rams from the estate of the late-owner Georgia Frontiere. On August 25, 2010, KSE became full owner of the Rams by unanimous consent of the NFL. In order to gain the approval of the NFL owners, KSE, with Stan Kroenke listed as the owner, agreed to turn over control of the Denver Nuggets and Colorado Avalanche to Josh Kroenke by the end of 2010, and Stan Kroenke also to give up his personal majority stakes in both teams in December 2014. The NFL does not allow its owners to hold majority control of major league teams in other NFL markets. On October 7, 2015, the NFL approved transfer of his ownership stake of the Avalanche and Nuggets to his wife, Ann Walton Kroenke, one of the Waltons, Walmart heirs.

KSE is the owner shareholder of soccer club Arsenal. In April 2007, Granada Ventures, a subsidiary of ITV plc, had sold its 9.9% stake in Arsenal Holdings plc to KSE. KSE went on to buy further shares in the club, taking the total stake to 12.19%. The club's board initially expressed skepticism that a bid would be in its best interests, By June 2008, the board had prepared to facilitate KSE take over the club, and on September 19, 2008, it was officially announced that Stan Kroenke had joined the Arsenal board of directors. KSE had a beneficial interest in, and controlled voting rights, over 18,594 shares, representing 29.9% of the issued shares. Thus, he was nearing the maximum 29.99% threshold, beyond which a compulsory offer for all remaining shares must be made.

On April 10, 2011, it was reported that KSE was in advanced talks to complete the takeover of Arsenal. The next day, it was announced that KSE increased its shares in Arsenal to 62.89% by purchasing the stakes of Danny Fiszman and Lady Nina Bracewell-Smith, and agreed to make an offer for the rest of the club at £11,750 per share, valuing the club at £731M. In August 2018, KSE completed the purchase of Arsenal Holdings after buying the remaining shares held by Alisher Usmanov. This took KSE's shareholding above 90% which necessitated de-listing the club from stock exchanges and initiating compulsory purchase of all remaining shares in the club. Upon completion of the compulsory purchase KSE owned the Premier League and FA Women's Super League teams and associated real estate, including the Emirates Stadium.

In September 2026, KSE announced its agreement to acquire the Los Angeles Angels from Arte Moreno. The deal is expected to close in 2027.

=== Esports ===
In late 2017, KSE developed an esports team franchise in the newly founded Overwatch League, named the Los Angeles Gladiators, that began their inaugural season later that year on December 6. In August 2019, Activision Blizzard announced that KSE had bought a franchise slot in the upcoming Call of Duty League (a franchise league). Like the company's Overwatch League franchise, the franchise was based in Los Angeles and known as the Los Angeles Guerrillas.

In November 2021, KSE rebranded their esports division as "The Guard", fielding a roster in the first-person shooter game, VALORANT. On February 22, 2023, "The Guard" laid off all employees in their content, social, talent, and creative teams. On August 29, 2023, "The Guard" parted ways with their Valorant team, marking their exit from competitive Valorant esports. The Los Angeles Gladiators later folded after the end of the 2023 Overwatch League season, along with the league itself. In September 2024, the Los Angeles Guerrillas were sold to French esports organization Gentle Mates, with the announcement of the sale made on December 4 prior to the start of the 2025 Call of Duty League season.

=== Real estate ===
Kroenke Sports & Entertainment owns Ball Arena in downtown Denver, home of the Nuggets and Avalanche, and co-owns Dick's Sporting Goods Park in Commerce City, home of the Rapids. Both venues were built by his development company. In 2002, Kroenke bought the historic Paramount Theatre in Denver. He established TicketHorse, a ticket company which provides in-house sales. Operations of 1stBank Center in Broomfield, Colorado, were taken over by Peak Entertainment—a joint venture between KSE and AEG Live Rocky Mountain, in June 2009, for 28 years.

As part of moving the Rams back to Los Angeles, Kroenke spearheaded the construction of a new billion dollar NFL stadium in Inglewood, California called SoFi Stadium. The stadium is a component of Hollywood Park, a mixed-use commercial and residential development project on the site of the former Hollywood Park Racetrack. On January 5, 2015, it was announced that Kroenke, the owner of the St. Louis Rams (now Los Angeles Rams) had partnered with Stockbridge Capital Group (owners of the Hollywood Park Land Company), to build an NFL stadium and complex on the existing Hollywood Park development and on a parcel of land owned by Kroenke. The stadium itself is owned and operated by KSE subsidiary StadCo LA, LLC. in partnership with the Los Angeles Chargers owners and opened in 2020 as the home to the Rams and the Chargers. As part of his ownership of Arsenal, Kroenke has control over the team's stadium Emirates Stadium in Holloway, London.

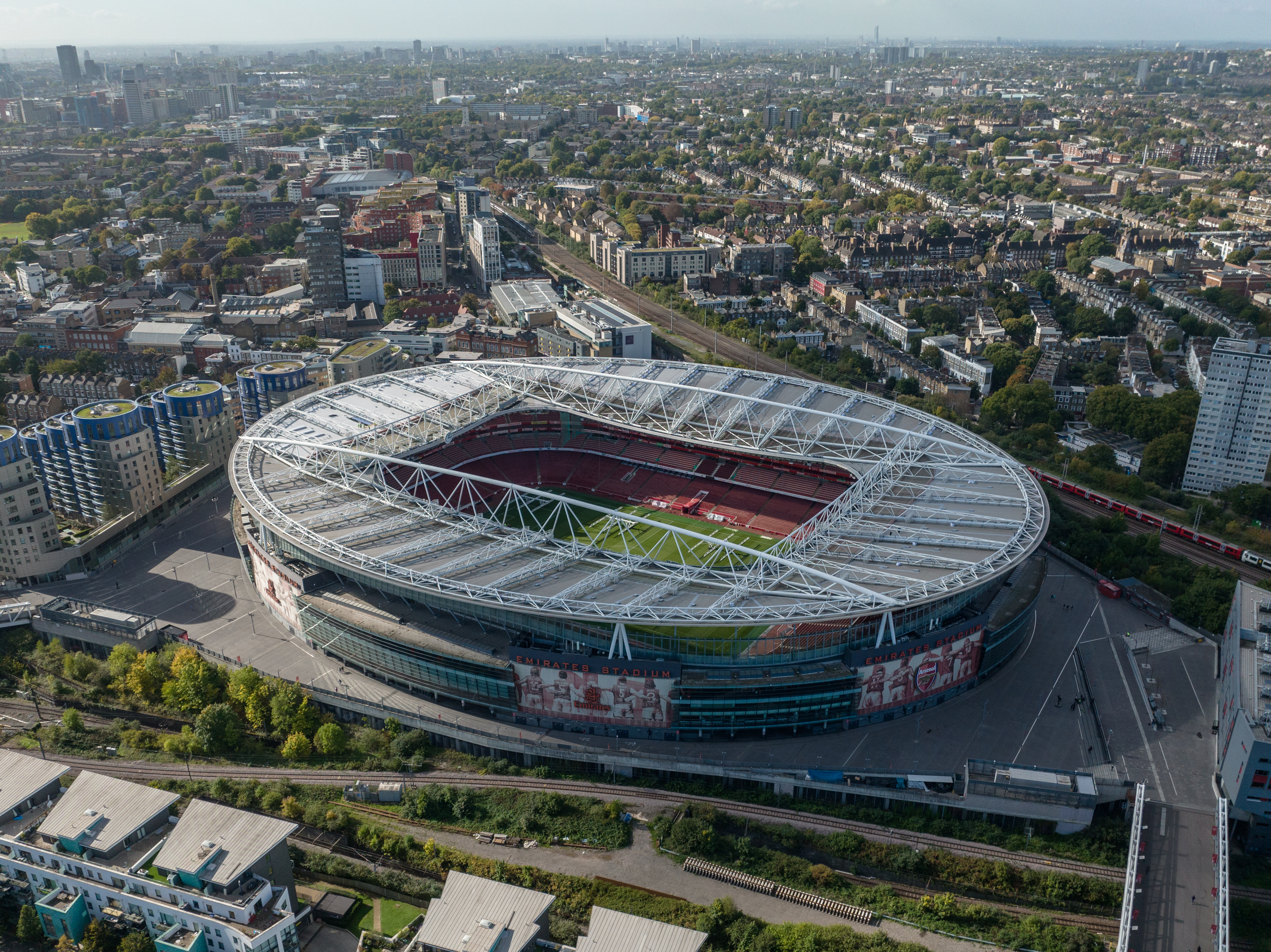
Emirates Stadium

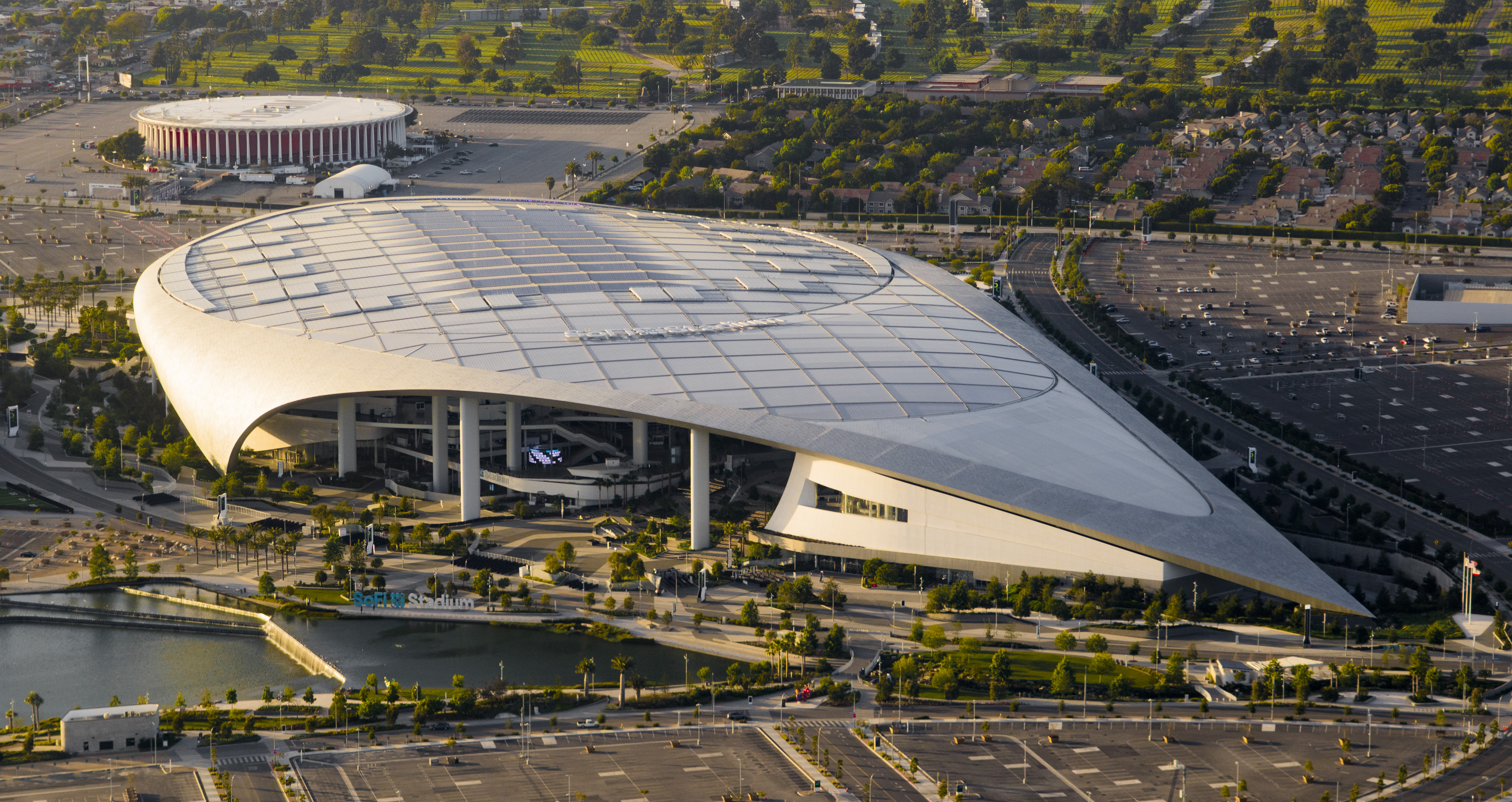
SoFi Stadium

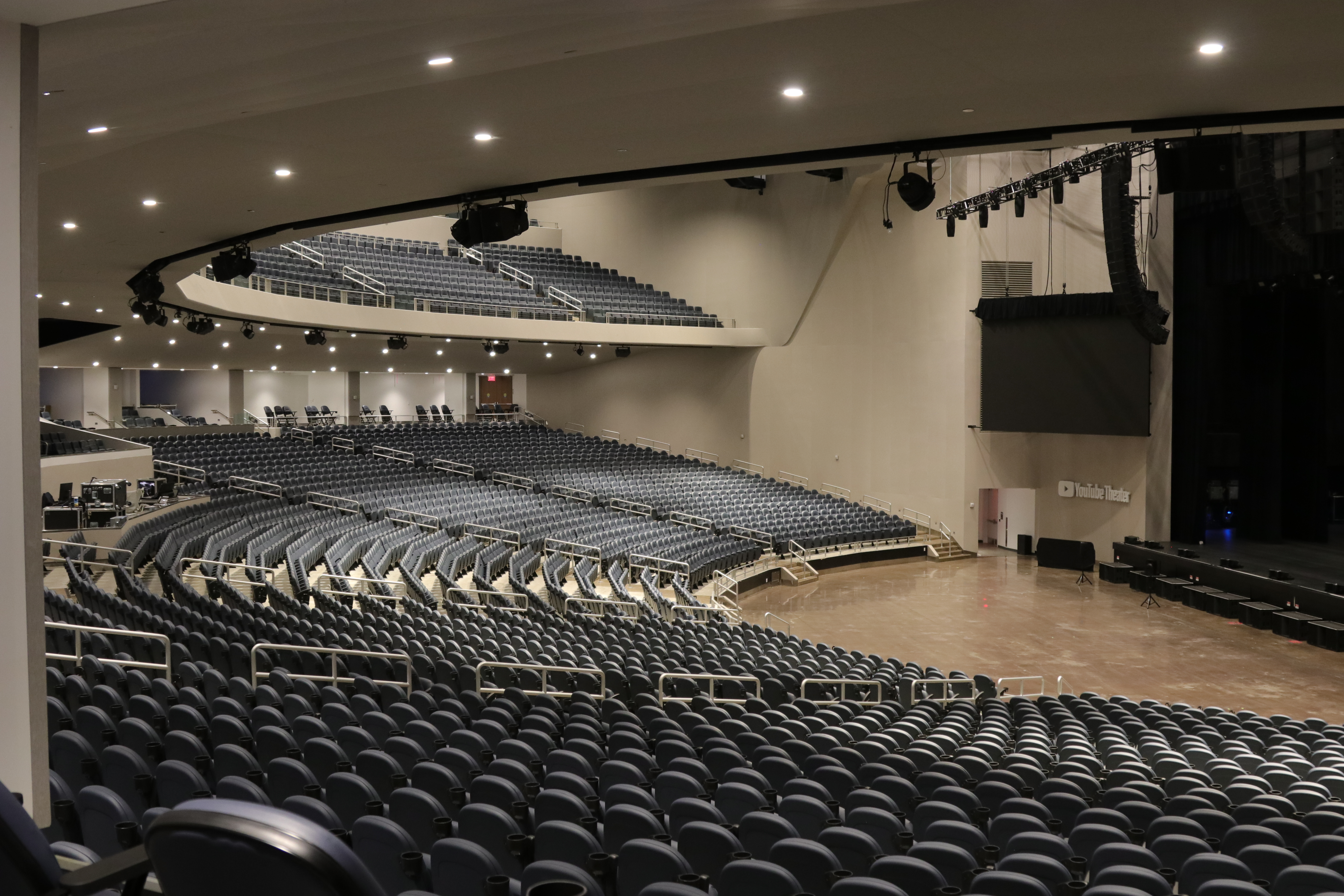
YouTube Theater

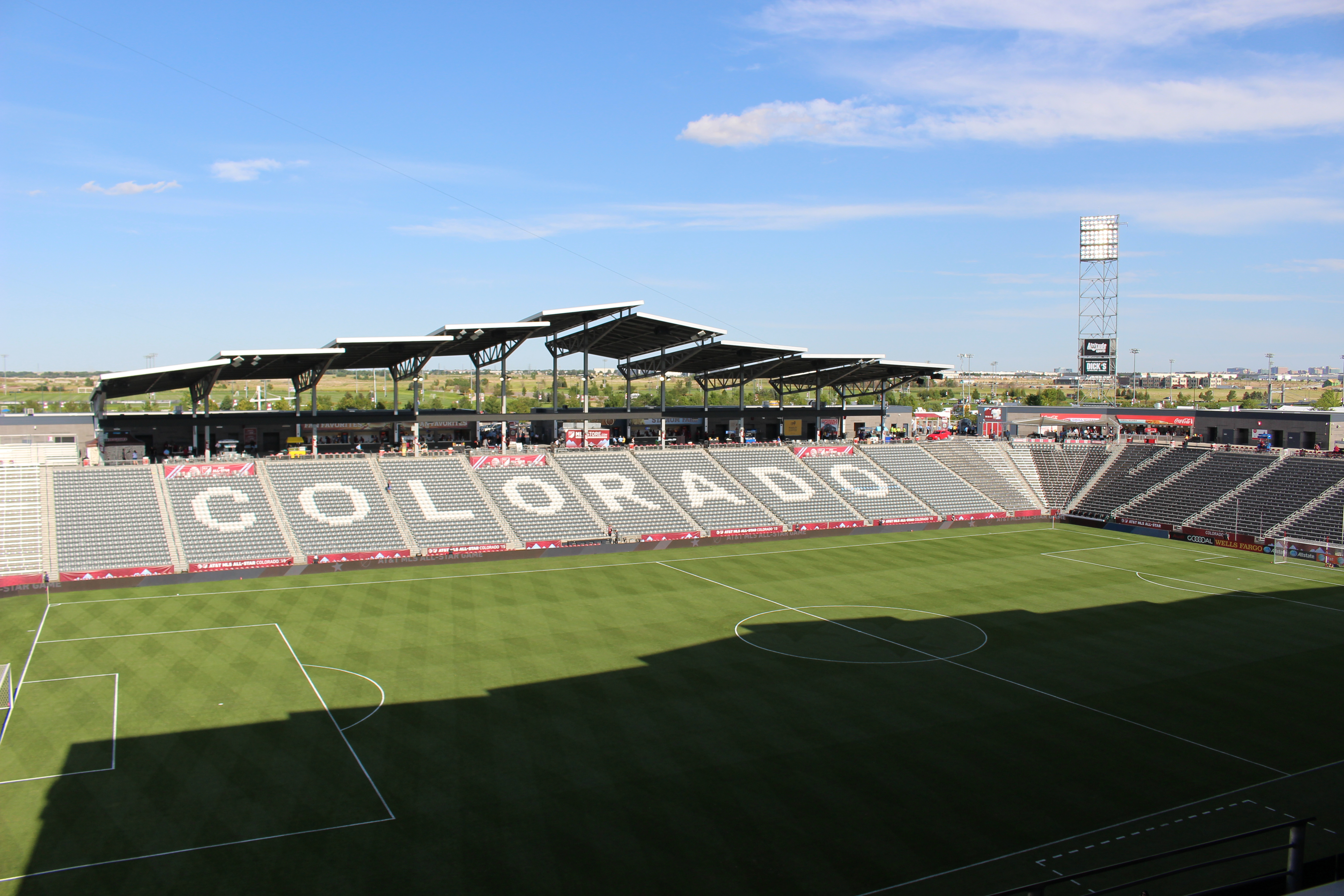
Dick's Sporting Goods Park

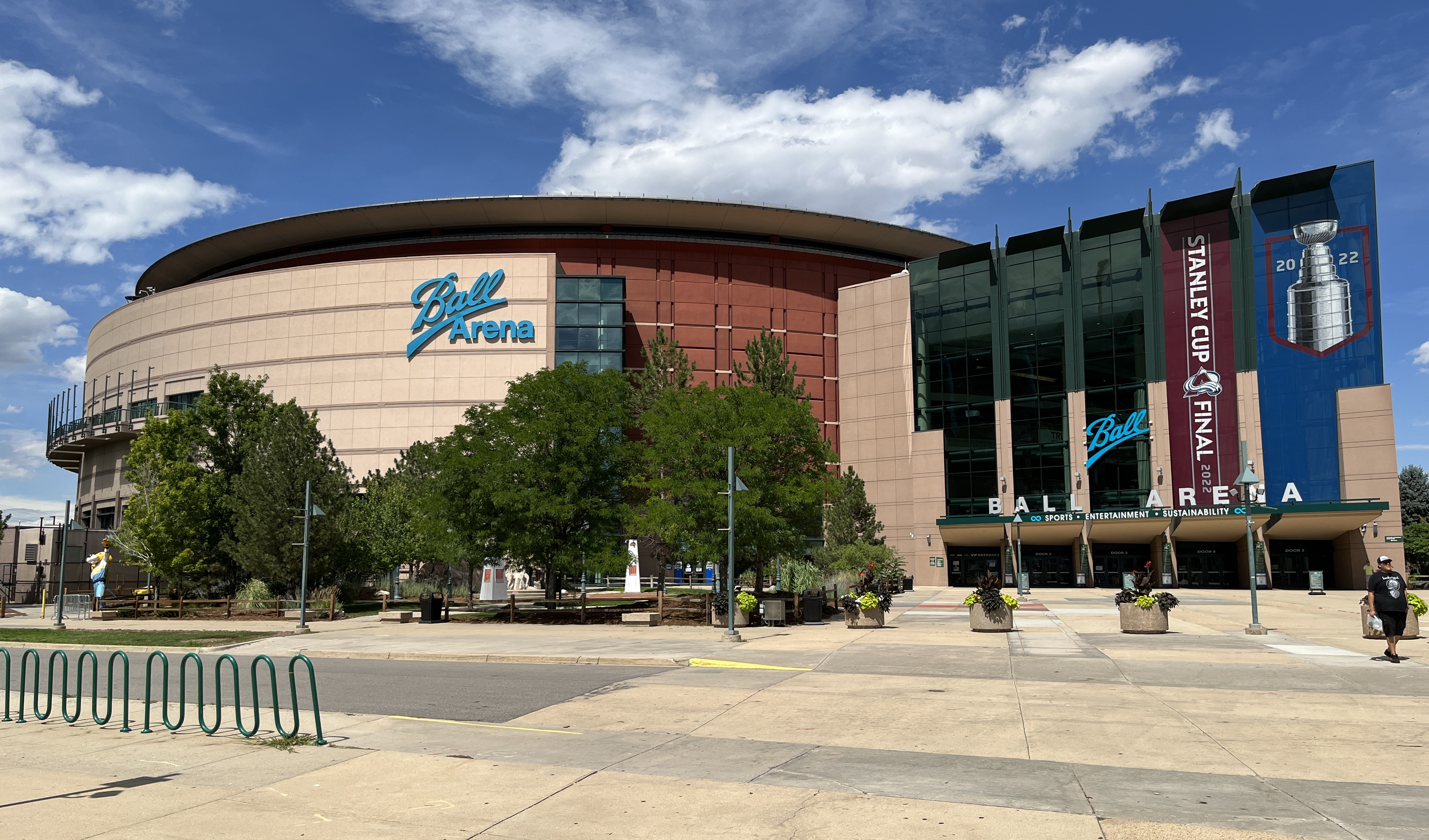
Ball Arena

=== Media ===
In 2004, Kroenke launched his own competitor to FSN Rocky Mountain (now known as AT&T SportsNet Rocky Mountain), Altitude, a new regional sports network which became the official broadcaster for both of Kroenke's teams on launch. On January 10, 2011, World Fishing Network announced that it had sold a 50% stake in its U.S. operations to KSE under the Altitude Sports and Entertainment brand. Also, in 2011, Altitude Sports and Entertainment purchased a 19.9% interest in the Canadian channel through its division Altitude WFN ULC. Altitude would later purchase the remaining 50% interest in the channel it did not already own. In 2013, Outdoor Channel was acquired by KSE. As part of the acquisition of Outdoor Channel's parent company by KSE it also acquired MyOutdoorTV.com, Cablecam and Skycam which Outdoor Channel Holdings Inc. acquired in 2011 and 2009 respectively.

In 2014, KSE acquired InterMedia Outdoor Holdings from InterMedia Partners which included Sportsman Channel, 15 market leading outdoor magazines, and 17 top websites, as well as television production operations. The company was later renamed Outdoor Sportsman Group. On October 12, 2015, Kroenke Sports Enterprises, announced they would acquire Wilks Broadcasting's Denver properties, including KXKL-FM, Country KWOF, and Adult Top 40 KIMN. Once the sale was approved by the FCC, KSE was expected to flip one of the three outlets to Sports and the Denver Nuggets, Colorado Avalanche, and Colorado Rapids would then move from their radio home in Denver, which was KKFN. The transaction was consummated on December 31, 2015, at a purchase price of $54 million.

On December 17, 2015, Entercom announced that it would sell KRWZ to KSE Radio Ventures (a division of Kroenke Sports & Entertainment), who would add the station to its three recently acquired FM properties in the Denver market. KSE also announced that KRWZ would flip to a new format when the sale closed, as Entercom moved the Oldies format to KEZW on December 27. After the change of ownership, KRWZ would adopt the new KKSE call letters. Furthermore, KSE announced that the station would return to sports talk and become "Altitude Sports 950" (named after KSE's Altitude cable channel). That was followed by the flipping of country formatted KWOF to sports KKSE-FM.
