= MyOutdoorTV =

Internet television channel

- Website type: Sports broadcasting
- Available in: English
- Owner: Kroenke Sports & Entertainment
- Website: www.myoutdoortv.com
- Launched: 2006
- Current status: Active

MyOutdoorTV is an internet television channel that provides streaming TV shows and product demonstrations to hunters, shooting sports enthusiasts, anglers, campers, boaters, and hikers. It is the largest online video network catering to outdoor programming.

MyOutdoorTV carries many outdoor-related cable shows that air on Outdoor Channel and Sportsman Channel, both in the form of subscription video on demand and through linear, genre-specific feeds.

Access is $9.99 per month to all programming, with select episodes and a single free linear streaming channel, available for free.

== History ==
The channel was launched in 2006 by David Hall and Chris Moise, former programming executives from TNN and CMT and at launch featured programming hosted by Hank Parker, Mark Sosin, Jimmy Houston, Larry Csonka, Roland Martin, Babe Winkelman, and others as well as a dozen radio shows and links to more than 150 outdoor blogs including a viewer created encyclopedia called "MyOutdoorWiki". It was acquired by Outdoor Channel in 2011. Outdoor Channel was later acquired by Kroenke Sports & Entertainment where the channel was made part of its Outdoor Sportsman Group collection.

MyOutdoorTV which was originally headquartered in Tennessee is now headquartered in Denver, Colorado, part of the Kroenke Sports & Entertainment family of companies.

== Controversy ==
The channel stirred controversy upon launch in the United Kingdom on 31 July 2017, where Kroenke owns part of the Premier League team Arsenal for its showing of "blood sports". The channel was condemned by British animal rights groups. MyOutdoorTV defended its programming "MOTV will present ethical, fair chase hunting and as long as it's legal it will be on there." "If you like hunting elephants, there will be legal elephant hunts, ethical elephant hunts, shown in that context."
