= Outdoor Channel =

American cable channel

- Country: United States; Canada
- Broadcast area: United States; Canada; Europe; Middle East; Asia; Africa; Australia
- Headquarters: Denver, Colorado

Programming
- Picture format: 1080i HDTV (downscaled to letterboxed 480i for the SDTV feed)

Ownership
- Owner: Outdoor Sportsman Group (Kroenke Sports & Entertainment); Rock Entertainment Holdings; AMC Networks International (EMEA region distributor)
- Sister channels: Sportsman Channel; World Fishing Network; Altitude

History
- Launched: 1 April 1994; 32 years ago
- Closed: 1 January 2019; 7 years ago (Malaysia); 1 July 2021; 4 years ago (Turkey); 1 August 2021; 4 years ago (EMEA); 1 June 2024; 23 months ago (Thailand)
- Former names: The Outdoor Channel (1994–2007)

Links
- Website: outdoorchannel.com

Availability

Terrestrial
- Digital terrestrial television (United States): Channel 6.7 (Alexandria, Minnesota)

Streaming media
- Service(s): 7plus, DirecTV Stream, Frndly TV, FuboTV, Sling TV

Previous Outdoor Channel logo

Outdoor Channel is an American pay television channel focused on the outdoors, offering programming that includes hunting, fishing, western lifestyle, off-road motorsports and adventure. It was launched on April Fool's Day (April 1) 1994. The network can be viewed on multiple platforms including high definition, video on demand as well as on its own website. In 2013, Outdoor Channel was acquired by Kroenke Sports Enterprises.

As of November 2023, Outdoor Channel is available to approximately 17,000,000 pay television households in the United States-down from its 2016 peak of 40,000,000 households. In December 2013, the Outdoor Channel was planned to relocate to Colorado from its current location of Temecula, California, supported by Colorado Economic Development Commission.

In March 2019, the channel became available in Australia via the ad-supported streaming service 7plus.

== Content ==
The network's primetime lineup is themed with each evening; fishing is featured on Mondays, with hunting on Tuesdays, Thursdays and Sundays, gun-specific programming on Wednesdays, and Hollywood films on Friday and Saturday nights.

- American Archer with Tom Nelson
- Benelli's American Birdhunter with Tom Knapp
- The Brigade: Race to the Hudson
- Carter's W.A.R. Wild Animal Response
- Duck Dynasty (reruns)
- Flying Wild Alaska
- Gold Fever with George and Tom Massie
- Gun Stories hosted by Joe Mantegna
- GunnyTime with R. Lee Ermey
- The Hunt for Monster Bass
- Jim Shockey's Hunting Adventures
- Jim Shockey's Uncharted
- Major League Fishing
- Midway USA's Rapid Fire with Iain Harrison and Mike Seeklander
- Mossy Oak's Hunting the Country
- On Your Own Adventures Hosted by Randy Newberg
- Realtree Road Trips with Michael Waddell
- Rubber Foot Buffalo Adventures with Mark Holt
- Shawn Michaels' MacMillan River Adventures with Shawn Michaels and Keith Mark
- Shooting Gallery hosted and produced by Michael Bane
- Shooting USA hosted by Jim Scoutten
- Steve's Outdoor Adventures with Steve West
- Ted Nugent's Spirit of the Wild hosted by Ted Nugent
- Trev Gowdy's Monster Fish
- Western Extreme with Jim Burnworth
- Wild Ops hosted by Ole Alcumbrac
- Winchester's World of Whitetail hosted by Rom Spomer

== High-definition channel ==
An HD feed of the channel was launched in 2004, with the name of Outdoor Channel 2 HD; it used to broadcast different programming in contrast with the SD channel, until it turned into a simulcast feed and rebranded simply to "Outdoor Channel HD". It currently broadcasts at 1080i and it is carried by most subscription providers. It was the first outdoor pay-TV network in June 2010 to offer a schedule solely made up of HD-filmed content.

== Conservation ==
Outdoor Channel mobilized 2,500 volunteers in September 2010 as part of its Conservation Tour of Duty for its Outdoor Channel Corps initiative. It is a philanthropic program that aims to improve public lands and spaces in order to ensure that the outdoor lifestyle thrives in America. Timed around National Public Lands Day, Outdoor Channel Corps deployed volunteers to a total of eight sites, where the network worked on restoration and improvement projects with partners and affiliates like Comcast, Time Warner, Boy Scouts of America, and the National Park Service.

== See also ==
=== Similar networks ===
- Sportsman Channel
- NBC Sports Outdoors (segment on NBCSN)
- MyOutdoorTV.com
