= Brigade (Soviet collective farm) =

Labor force division

The brigade (Russian: brigada) was a labor force division within the Soviet collective farm (kolkhoz).

== The 1930s ==
The mass collectivization drive of the late 1920s and early 1930s pushed the peasantry from individual household production into an archipelago of collective farms. The question of internal organization was important in the new kolkhozes. The most basic measure was to divide the workforce into a number of groups, generally known as brigades, for working purposes. `By July 1929 it was already normal practice for the large kolkhoz of 200-400 households to be divided into temporary or permanent work units of 15-30 households.'

The authorities gradually came down in favour of the fixed, combined brigade, that is the brigade with its personnel, land, equipment and draught horses fixed to it for the whole period of agricultural operations, and taking responsibility for all relevant tasks during that period.

The brigade was headed by a brigade leader (brigadir). He was usually a local man (few were women).

=== Land allotment ===
The authorities resolved that each brigade was to have a fixed plot in every field of the crop rotation. A Communist Party resolution of 4 February 1932 said the brigade's land should be fixed for the agricultural year, but some kolkhozes found that it helped forward planning to fix it for the whole period of the crop-rotation, and this practice was formally adopted in the kolkhoz Model Statute of 1935. In the central Asian cotton-growing kolkhozes, each brigade might hold its land as an integral unit, its members living within this unit.

=== Extent ===
Almost two-thirds of kolkhozes (65.1%) had two or more field brigades in 1937. (Presumably it was the smaller kolkhozes, in northern Russia and elsewhere, that were not divided into brigades.) Brigades varied in size from 200 workers in the north, north-west and parts of the non-black-earth centre, to about 100 in the Lower and Middle Volga. The average, in 1937, was 62 people. A brigade in the black-earth had about 10 hectares of land per member; thus a brigade of 50, for example, had 500 hectares.

== See also ==
- Zveno (Soviet collective farming)
