= Williams and Ree =

American comedy duo

Bruce Williams and Terry Ree, alternately billed as both "Williams and Ree" and "The Indian and the White Guy", were a pair of American comedians. From the late 1960s until 2024, they performed throughout the United States.

Williams and Ree met in 1968 at Black Hills State University in Spearfish, South Dakota, as members of a band who filled time between songs with comedy sketches. Their humor soon became more popular than their music. Much of the duo's banter plays upon the stereotypes held of Native Americans. Ree was a member of the Crow Creek Sioux.

Williams and Ree performed with Garth Brooks, The Oak Ridge Boys and Tim McGraw, and made television appearances on The Nashville Network. Their comedy albums include The Best of Williams and Ree, Taking Reservations and Way Up Norsk. They also made two independent films in South Dakota, Williams and Ree: The Movie and Totem Ree-Call.

Williams and Ree performed throughout the United States and Canada at Native American gaming venues and fairs. They were regulars at the Norsk Høstfest in Minot, ND. They were the regular hosts of the Craven Country Jamboree in Craven, Saskatchewan, and Country Thunder festivals in Wisconsin and Arizona. In 2019, Federation of Sovereign Indigenous Nations chief Bobby Cameron unsuccessfully called for them to be banned from Country Thunder events due to "racist material" at their Craven performance.

They were inducted into the South Dakota Rock Hall of Fame in 2018.

In the spring of 2024, Williams and Ree announced their retirement from touring.

Ree died on December 21, 2024, at the age of 75.
