= Altitude Sports and Entertainment =

American regional sports network

- Altitude logo
- Type: Regional sports network
- Country: United States
- Broadcast area: Colorado; Arizona; Idaho; Kansas; Montana; Nebraska northeastern Nevada; New Mexico western South Dakota; Wyoming; Nationwide (USA) Canada (via satellite)
- Headquarters: Centennial, Colorado

Programming
- Language: English
- Picture format: 1080i (HDTV)

Ownership
- Owner: Kroenke Sports & Entertainment
- Sister channels: Outdoor Channel; Sportsman Channel; World Fishing Network

History
- Launched: September 4, 2004
- Founder: Stan Kroenke

Links
- Website: www.altitude.tv

Availability

Streaming media
- AltitudeNOW: www.altitudenow.com (U.S. cable internet subscribers only; requires login from participating providers to stream content; some events may not be available due to league rights restrictions)
- DirecTV Stream: Internet Protocol Television
- FuboTV: Internet Protocol Television

Altitude Sports and Entertainment (usually referred to as simply Altitude or Altitude TV) is an American regional sports cable and satellite television channel owned by Stan Kroenke's Kroenke Sports & Entertainment. The channel, which serves the Rocky Mountain region of the United States (specifically the Denver metropolitan area), features a mix of professional, collegiate, and high school sporting events as well as some entertainment-based programming.

Launched on September 4, 2004, Altitude is headquartered in the Denver suburb of Centennial, Colorado. Altitude also operates Altitude 2, a secondary overflow channel that is used in the event of scheduling conflicts with games simultaneously set to air on the main Altitude channel.

== History ==
Altitude Sports and Entertainment was launched on September 4, 2004. The channel was launched as a team-owned competitor to FSN Rocky Mountain (now known as AT&T SportsNet Rocky Mountain). It became the official broadcaster for both of Kroenke's teams on launch.

Altitude agreed to carry some games from the first season of the Fall Experimental Football League in October and November 2014.

Beginning with the 2024–25 NBA season and the 2024–25 NHL season, Altitude Sports reached an agreement with Tegna Inc. to simulcast 20 Denver Nuggets games and 20 Colorado Avalanche games over-the-air. Half of the games will be simulcast on KTVD, with the remaining games on KUSA. Altitude Sports also launched a direct-to-consumer streaming service, Altitude+, which will stream all games on Altitude Sports for $19.95 per month.

== Programming ==
The channel holds broadcast rights to the three Denver-based professional sports teams that are owned by Kroenke – the NBA's Denver Nuggets, the NHL's Colorado Avalanche, and the National Lacrosse League's Colorado Mammoth. Altitude features in-depth coverage of the three teams, including holding broadcast rights to the majority of Avalanche, Mammoth and Nuggets games. The channel's logo bug changes colors depending on the team being broadcast (powder blue and gold for the Nuggets, burgundy and dark blue for the Avalanche and maroon and black for the Mammoth).

Altitude also holds television rights to Major League Lacrosse's Denver Outlaws and college athletics from the Rocky Mountain Athletic Conference. They also simulcast select college football games from Montana, Montana State, New Mexico State and the Southland Conference. The channel previously broadcast Southeastern Conference, Western Athletic Conference, Big East Conference, Big 12 Conference games from ESPN+, and the American Hockey League's Colorado Eagles from 2004 to 2015.

It also airs entertainment programming including live theatrical productions and concerts, as well as a simulcast of veteran basketball referee Irv Brown's weekdaily radio program. Former Colorado governor Bill Owens hosted a talk show on the network during the final two years of his administration.

Altitude serves as a production partner for the preseason games of the Los Angeles Rams of the National Football League, which are also principally owned by Kroenke.

On August 10, 2022, Altitude signed a two-year agreement with the Air Force Academy to air college football, men's and women's college basketball and college ice hockey events hosted by the Academy.

=== Broadcast regions ===
Altitude covers a ten-state area. Due to restrictions imposed by the NBA and NHL, Avalanche and Nuggets games are not available in all areas. To comply with these restrictions, Altitude divides its broadcast area into multiple zones.

Area covered	Avalanche	Nuggets
Colorado, Idaho (Central Idaho, Eastern Idaho), Kansas (except Johnson and Wyandotte counties), Nebraska, Northern New Mexico, Wyoming	†	†
Western South Dakota, Johnson and Wyandotte counties in Kansas	No	Yes
Arizona, Idaho (Magic Valley, Southwestern Idaho, and northern Idaho Panhandle), Montana, Northeastern Nevada, southern New Mexico	†	No
† Since the establishment of the Utah Mammoth in 2024–25, Avalanche and Mammoth games are not available in northeastern Nevada and southwestern Wyoming.

== Distribution ==
On August 28, 2019, Altitude was dropped by Dish Network. Three days later, the channel was dropped by Comcast and DirecTV. All three providers are accusing Altitude of demanding significant annual price increases for the channel's content, which they deemed unacceptable. On October 31, 2019, Altitude was restored by DirecTV after the two sides reached a multi-year agreement. Altitude would sue Comcast in November 2019, alleging that the cable provider was attempting to drive Altitude out of business and take over its broadcast rights for itself. The two parties settled their lawsuit in March 2023, but a deal that would return Altitude to Comcast systems would not come until February 2025. During the dispute, Altitude became one of a few major regional sports networks that Comcast did not carry. As Comcast is the largest cable provider in the Denver area, this meant that from 2019 through 2025, most Nuggets and Avalanche games were unavailable in Denver without a DirecTV subscription. The dispute with Dish Network remains unresolved.

On June 1, 2021, Altitude waived its exclusive local rights to broadcast game 5 of the NBA playoff series between the Denver Nuggets and the Portland Trail Blazers so that Comcast and Dish Network subscribers could watch the game on NBA TV (which would normally be subject to blackout restrictions).

On October 6, 2022, Altitude and FuboTV announced an agreement that will allow the streaming service to carry the network, including Avalanche and Nuggets games throughout the ten-state region in time for the start of the 2022-23 NBA and NHL seasons. In September 2024, Altitude announced a deal with Tegna, operators of Denver's NBC affiliate KUSA and KTVD, to simulcast a limited schedule of Nuggets and Avalanche games on the stations.

== On-air staff ==
=== Current on-air staff ===
- Kyle Keefe – host

=== Colorado Avalanche ===
- Marc Moser – TV play-by-play
- Mark Rycroft – TV studio analyst (rotating), TV analyst and radio analyst
- John-Michael Liles - TV analyst
- Kyle Keefe – TV studio host
- Rachel Tos - TV rink-side reporter (rotating)
- Vic Lombardi - TV rink-side reporter (rotating)
- Conor McGahey – Radio play-by-play/analyst
- Mark Bertagnolli – Radio studio host
- Alan Roach – Public address

=== Denver Nuggets ===
- Noah Reed – play-by-play
- Bill Hanzlik – studio analyst
- Jason Richardson – studio analyst
- Todd Romero – host
- Katy Winge – analyst
- Lauren Gardner – host/reporter [rotating]
- Vic Lombardi – host

== Altitude HD ==
Altitude HD is a high definition simulcast feed of Altitude Sports and Entertainment, that broadcasts in the 1080i resolution format. The HD feed broadcasts Denver Nuggets and Colorado Avalanche games in HD. The channel also operates a high definition simulcast feed of Altitude 2.
