= Zveno (Soviet collective farming) =

The zveno (Russian: звено, IPA: [zʲvʲɪˈno]; Ukrainian: ланка, romanized: lanka) was a small grassroots work-group within Soviet collective farms. It was, or became, a subunit within the collective-farm brigade.

== Evolution during the 1930s ==
From the earliest times, brigades had been subdivided into groups for carrying out some or all of their tasks. These subgroups were originally known by a variety of names, but by 1933, the label zveno had become standard in fieldwork brigades. Like the early brigades themselves, the zvenya could be temporary, specializing in one particular job (ploughing, harrowing, sowing, harvesting, etc.), or fixed for some period of time. The latter would embrace several related tasks, and probably have land plots fixed for the period of their work. They could also specialize in a single crop or handle a number of cultures.

The mass methods of work favoured at the beginning of collectivization were rapidly found to be inefficient. A huge column of ploughs simultaneously tilling a field might appear a glamorous example of large-scale socialist agriculture. But if just one plough broke down, the work pattern of the whole column was disrupted. Also, in large brigades, accounting was complicated and supervision difficult. The favoured size of the primary working unit progressively shrank. As early as March 1930, columns of 15-20 ploughs were acknowledged to be more efficient than those with 70. By the beginning of 1933, even this scale of work was a rarity. By this time, "mass work" came in the shape of zvenya of 3-5 horse-drawn "machines". In the 1932 harvest, in large collective farms, the typical zveno was composed of just one reaping machine, with 6-8 people binding the grain behind it.

During 1933-4, the authorities began to come down in favour of the more stable kinds of zveno. This was to ensure the responsibility and accountability of the zveno's members for their work. At the beginning of 1933, the agricultural writer Samarina considered that, in the drier steppe areas, task-combined zvenya would ensure that all related jobs in spring work (ploughing, harrowing, sowing) would be carried out in quick succession before the soil dried out. (Task-specialised were still regarded as useful in non-black earth areas.) A year later, another writer, Kayurova, extended the idea of fixity to the whole season of "early work".

The zveno was headed by a zveno leader or zvene'voi (feminine zvene'vaya). The zvene'voi usually held the key job in the zveno, e.g. the sowing or reaping machine operator. Zvenya had varying sizes, though they were generally fairly small, and they could have a substructure. Samarina's recommended zveno was composed of two subunits consisting of a harrow and two ploughs each, and a sowing machine. Kayurova suggested a ploughing-harrowing zveno corresponding to just one of these subunits. Samarina's zveno would have had eight personnel, including two for the sowing machine. Samarina's had three workers; an additional worker was needed when the zveno switched to work involving sowing. The zveno needed to be of this size to preserve its stability in switching from one "complex" of tasks to another.

At the end of 1933, a USSR-wide conference of collective farms decided that stability was best served by preserving a nucleus of workers who had achieved work-harmony. Thus, the zveno would have stability as opposed to an inflexible fixing of all personnel. The conference also recognized the fundamental importance of the zveno, calling it "the executive cell of the brigade".

A task-combined zveno, wrote Kayurova, had or should have plots of land fixed to it for the whole period of its work cycle. Task-specialized zvenya (e.g. of harrowers or sowers) bore no fixed responsibility for particular plots, but worked in all their brigade's plots. It was consequently very difficult to pin down responsibility for bad work. A fixed plot ensured "timely and high-quality execution" of work.

=== "Permanent" zvenya ===
Fully fixed or permanent zvenya (of one year's duration or more) were first set up in individual specialist crops. In May 1933, a central Communist Party and government resolution recommended that a zvenya of 5-7 workers, responsible for all agricultural operations in the year, be widely adopted for sugar-beet. A similar resolution was issued for potatoes and vegetables in June 1933. In cotton, it was argued, the continuous and continually fluctuating labour demand during the year necessitated a system both stable and flexible throughout the year. Labour demand for a 10-hectare plot of cotton varied between 1 and 14 workers in the year. For the sake of stability, there should be a basic skeleton of zvene'voi and skilled workers, and the plot should be fixed for the year. Some cotton zvenya were set up in 1934, and a central resolution for their proliferation was issued in June 1935. Fixed zvenya in flax also began to be set up, for example, in Leningrad oblast, where there were in 1937 19,458 flax zvenya, covering 105,000 hectares or about three-quarters of all flax crops. In 1938, about 50,000 flax zvenya were organized in Smolensk oblast {*including 7,500 Stakhanovites}; over two-thirds of all flax sowings were attached to them. A central decree for their promulgation was issued in April 1938.

In grain, the position lagged. Even in the mid-1930s, writers were arguing that (in contrast to specialist crops) the cultivation of cereals fell into two distinct and separate phases, {*early and late,} and thus there was no basis for fixed zvenya for the whole year. However, it was in the mid-1930s that fixed zvenya of Stakhanovites (elitist shock workers) began to be set up for grain. This was in the interests of responsibility. These zvenya too adhered to the principle of a fixed skeleton of skilled personnel during the year, with a fluctuating periphery of labourers.

Some zvenya existed in permanence from the mid-1930s onwards, and can be traced from year to year. These, however, were award-winning zvenya and may not have been typical.

Fixed zvenya varied in size, having 4, 8, 12 or exceptionally even 18 members (this latter figure corresponding in size to the smallest brigades). But small zvenya were both more efficient and stable than larger ones. A study of Stakhanovite sugar-beet zvenya in 1938 showed that zvenya of 4-6 people were the most efficient and stable. Larger Zvenya shrank in size.

=== Overall extent and numbers ===
Fixed zvenya had at first only been established in certain crop cultures and certain brigades of a collective farm. But by the end of the 1930s, the dominant trend, at least in the southern grain-surplus areas, was to assign all collective-farm personnel, cultures and land plots to zvenya. Some zvenya were assigned representative proportions of the cultures of their region (i.e. they were completely unspecialized). A sample survey of zvenya in the late 1930s showed that, while 68% of zvenya had from 3-6 cultures, only 4% specialized in a single culture.

Overall figures for the extent of zvenya first appear in the late 1930s. This is presumably because fixed zvenya were then becoming more widely established. Shorter-lived zvenya would have been more difficult to keep track of. In 1938, there were 542,200 (fixed) zvenya in the USSR as a whole, to which were attached 12.9 million hectares of sowings, including 5.4 million hectares of grain. Thus, fixed zvenya were limited in extent at this stage, especially in grain. In March 1939, a Party congress resolution called for the "wide adoption of zvenya in collective farms". Zvenya thereafter spread rapidly. A survey of mid-1939 showed that 65.6% of investigated collective farms had zvenya, and that 37.4% of their cropped ploughland was assigned to zvenya. In 1945, there were 984,000 in the USSR (but slightly fewer at the beginning of 1950). (These figures, however, greatly overstate the effective numbers of zvenya. They presumably apply to zvenya when set up at the beginning of a year, but many subsequently disintegrated. In 1949, for example, only 48.8% of zvenya set up in the USSR survived to the end of the harvest.)

== After World War II ==
Many kolkhozy required reconstruction after the Second World War. In the late 1940s zvenya independent of brigades began to be set up in some areas. Kursk Oblast was at the forefront of this movement. In 1947, 96% of the grain area in the province (excluding maize) was assigned to such zvenya. The zvenya were responsible for the whole work cycle, including threshing and delivery to the State grain-collecting centre. These developments ultimately proved too much for the regime to tolerate. In February 1950, Pravda published a blanket condemnation of general-purpose zvenya, mainly because (it stated) the small-scale plots of the "independent" zvenya inhibited the use of machinery. (For the same reason, row- and industrial-crop zvenya were acceptable in so far as mechanization was not yet sufficiently developed in these areas.) However, a still more important reason would seem to have been that zvenya, independent of brigades, fell outside the State's imposed structure for the economic exploitation of the peasantry. Kursk Oblast fell seriously behind in its delivery obligations as a result of the system it had practised.

== The post-Stalin era ==
Zvenya seem to have survived in some shape or form, whether `underground' or overtly, in the early 1950s. Row- and industrial-crop zvenya continued to be reported favourably in the press. After Stalin's death, the `underestimation' of zvenya in row and industrial crops was condemned.

In the late 1950s, a new breed of zvenya, the mechanized zvenya, began to arise. Though these zvenya were employed intermittently in place of the more usual brigades over the next thirty years, they never became widespread. (Eight percent of agriculture overall was under "assignmentless zvenya" (beznaryadnaya zvenya) in the 1960s/1970s.)
