= The Brigade: Race to the Hudson =

- Country of origin: United States
- Original language: English
- No. of seasons: 1
- No. of episodes: 8

Production
- Executive producer: Robert Cohen
- Running time: 60 minutes (incl. ads)
- Production company: Media Headquarters

Original release
- Network: Outdoor Channel
- Release: 22 April 2019 – present

The Brigade: Race to the Hudson (or simply The Brigade) is an American reality television series which debuted on 22 April 2019, on the Outdoor Channel. The series sees 10 strangers cooperate to travel via part of the York Factory Express through Canada to reach York Factory, Manitoba, on Hudson Bay within 28 days, to share in US$500,000. Differentiating itself from other survival reality shows such as Survivor, there were no eliminations or structured challenges along the route, though food and other supplies were provided at predetermined points.

The original premise for the program, when first announced in 2018, was a US$1 million prize to cover the full 2,600-mile (4,200 km) York Factory Express route in 10 weeks. However production determined the unfeasibility of contestants being able to achieve this goal and shortened the course. A crew of 35 worked on the program.

The program is sponsored by Bass Pro Shops, produced by Media Headquarters, and distributed by Kew Media Distribution. The distributor hoped to sell the format to European, Australian, New Zealand and Asian broadcasters.

== Contestants ==
Name	Occupation	Hometown
Austin Metheny	Landscaper and hunting-fishing guide	Hurst, Texas
Carley Julien	Nurse	Port Hardy, BC
Don Mann	Retired Navy Seal/author	Cape Charles, Virginia
Dylan Applebaum	Accounting student	Montreal, Quebec
Kaleb Summers	Self-employed subcontractor	Claremore, Oklahoma
Leroy Fontaine	Firefighter paramedic	Hammonds Plains, Nova Scotia
Matthew Aird	Paramedic/whitewater rafting guide	Rossland, BC
Traci Kroupa	Retired military veteran	Yorkville, IL
Tracyn Thayer	Festival manager	Mason Township, Maine
Vincent Coulombe	General contractor/canoe guide	Langley, BC

== Episodes ==
No. in season	Title	Original release date	U.S. viewers (millions)
1	"A Boat Called Wanda-er"	22 April 2019	N/A
2	"Paralysis By Overanalysis"	30 April 2019	N/A
3	"Against The Current"	6 May 2019	N/A
4	"The Way Down From Here"	13 May 2019	N/A
5	"No Time For Breaks"	20 May 2019	N/A
6	"Risks and Trepidations"	27 May 2019	N/A
7	"Before We Sink"	3 June 2019	N/A
8	"All Or Nothing"	10 June 2019	N/A
