= Youth Brigade =

Youth Brigade may refer to:

- Youth Brigade (band), a punk band from Los Angeles, California
- Youth Brigade (Washington, D.C. band), a punk band
- National Youth Service (Zimbabwe), a government program, colloquially known as the Youth Brigade
