= Made 2 Rise =

American patriotic post-grunge and hard rock band

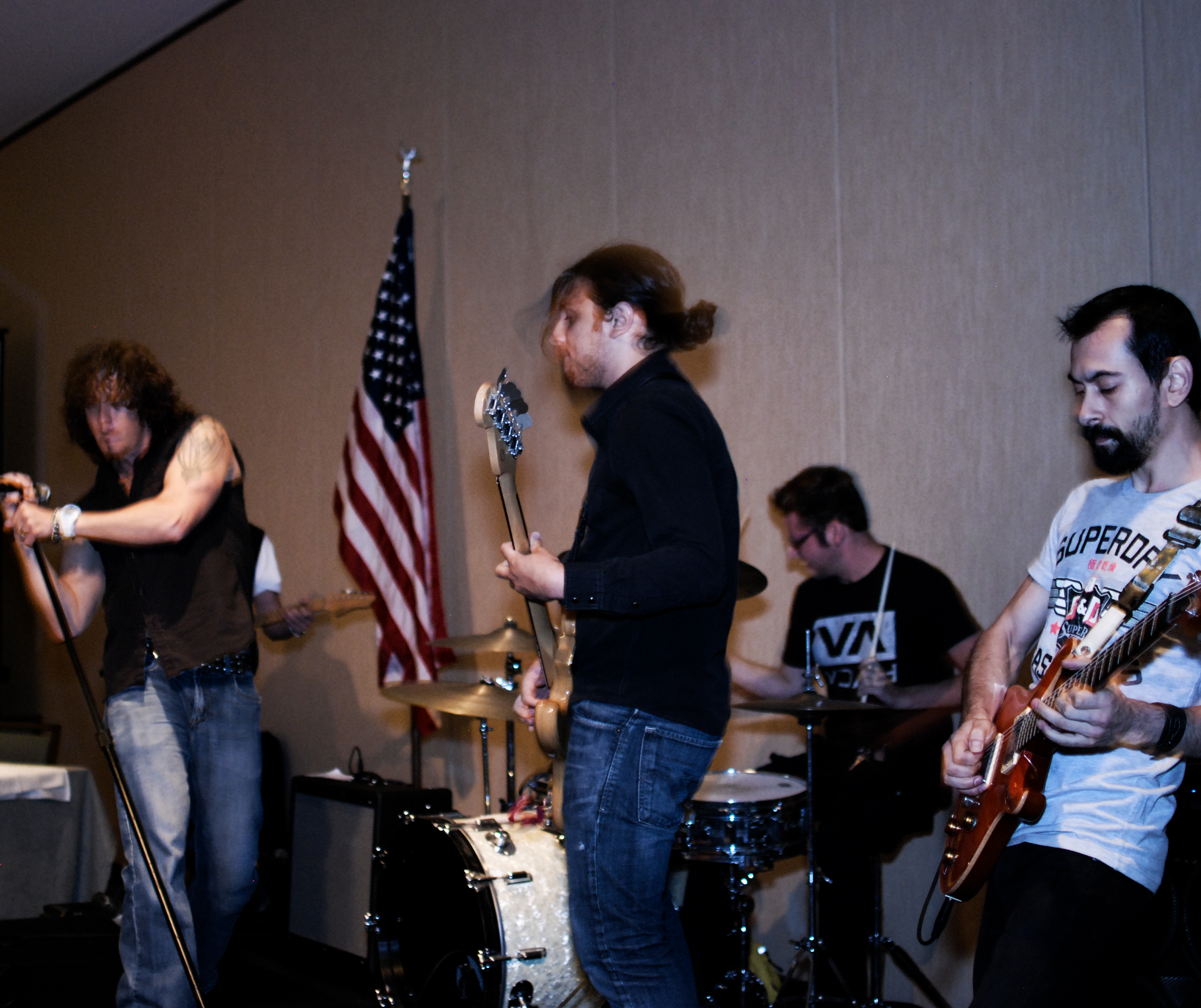
- Performing in Virginia as Madison Rising in 2012

Background information
- Genres: Post-grunge, hard rock
- Years active: 2011–present
- Label: No label association
- Members: Rio Hiett; Ted Hile; Adam Lefevre
- Website: made2risemusic.com

Made 2 Rise is an American patriotic post-grunge and hard rock band, formed in 2011 as Madison Rising by Rick Mgrdechian and Dave Bray. The band's original name came from the street in Hoboken, New Jersey where their recording studio was located, but the band later considered it to also be in reference to former president James Madison.

As Madison Rising, the band described themselves as being "constitutional" and "America's most patriotic rock band" — having frequently invoked themes of conservatism in their lyrics, and having conducted initiatives in support of first responders and the United States Armed Forces. The band has cited groups such as Creed as an influence on their style.

Madison Rising gained some prominence in 2014, following the band's performance of the U.S. national anthem at a NASCAR event in February, and the announcement that it would perform the theme song for Amazing America with Sarah Palin, a television program starring former Governor of Alaska and 2008 Republican vice presidential candidate Sarah Palin.

== History ==
Madison Rising was the creation of New York City entrepreneur Richard Mgrdechian, who chose the members of the band by placing ads on Craigslist and YouTube, and then holding "endless" auditions in 2011. Dave Bray, the original lead singer for the band, enlisted in the United States Navy at the age of 18. Before being shipped off, Dave found an interest in music, and formed a band in his garage his senior year of high school. According to Bray, "It was my last-ditch effort at rebellion before signing my life away." The band was first named after Madison Street in Hoboken, New Jersey, where their studio, Water Music Recorders, was located. Later on, the band also acknowledged its name as being in honor of U.S. Founding Father James Madison, because they wanted to "bring back patriotism and the belief system from a time when the Constitution was being written". While other names such as "Authors of Liberty" and "Soldiers for Freedom" were considered, Madison Rising felt the most "rock and roll" of them all, evoking imagery of him "rising from the grave".

Madison Rising, the band's self-titled debut album, was released in October 2011 via CD Baby. In early December 2011, the band attempted to procure a permit for a live "Take Back Wall Street" performance in Manhattan’s Zuccotti Park, in response to the Occupy Wall Street protests. The permit was ultimately denied by the park's ownership, Brookfield Properties. Two months later, the band played a short show for Occupy Congress in January 2012. Lead singer Dave Bray said that, to his shock, they were "met with a warm welcome" during the band's five-song set before several hundred Occupy demonstrators. Their second album, American Hero, was released via CD Baby in November 2013 and is dedicated to military members, police, firefighters, and other first responders.

In March 2014, the band announced they had been chosen to provide the theme song for Amazing America, a Sarah Palin-hosted program on the US cable network Sportsman Channel. In keeping with the show's subject matter, the theme song's lyrics contain references to nature, flags, glory, dogs, horses, trucks, and guns.

In early April 2014, former band member Alex Bodnar initiated a civil lawsuit in Brooklyn against band manager Richard Mgrdechian for owed "wages, royalties and [production] credit". The band performed a "Patriot Party" concert in Anderson, South Carolina on April 5, 2014, for the Rocky Mountain Elk Foundation. They played another "Patriot Party" on April 18 in Bunkerville, Nevada, for supporters of controversial rancher Cliven Bundy.

== Musical style and themes ==
Bray noted that bands such as Creed and Nickelback "were the soundtrack of our generation for a while", and that he was not ashamed by the comparisons. The band describes themselves as being "constitutional" and "pro-patriotic", and have even referred to themselves as being "America's most patriotic rock band" in promotion. The band has also paid tribute to the United States Armed Forces in its albums, going as far as recording a music video for its arrangement of the "Marines' Hymn" for the 239th birthday of the United States Marine Corps.

Madison Rising's original songs incorporated political themes, with a particular emphasis on conservatism; "Come to the Ready" contains lyrics critical of Barack Obama, alluding to the "re-election of an antichrist" and describing him as a "liar". Mgrdechian explained that the "antichrist" lyric was meant to "highlight our belief that he doesn't have our country’s best interests in mind and is in fact doing a lot to hurt us in the long run, in particular turning Americans against one another, which is the last thing we need right now", rather than from a religious standpoint.

Jonathan Widran of Allmusic described their "socially conscious aesthetic" as being "reminiscent of the pointed folk music of the '60s—even though they are presumably on the other side of the political fence".

=== National anthem ===
Madison Rising received prominent attention for their arrangement of the U.S. national anthem; considering it a contrast to Jimi Hendrix's rendition, lead singer Dave Bray explained that he "took the words and formatted them so that they feel more like a modern day rock song" and "took liberties with the melodies to make it a little more singable."

The band has performed the anthem at various sporting events, including the PBR World Finals in Las Vegas, Nevada, the opening ceremonies for the 2014 Special Olympics USA in Newark, New Jersey, the Military Bowl, and was also included on the soundtrack for Dinesh D'Souza's 2014 documentary film America: Imagine the World Without Her.

The band's performance of the anthem at the DRIVE4COPD 300, the opening event of the 2014 NASCAR Nationwide Series season at Daytona International Speedway in February 2014, was poorly received by critics and those in attendance, attracting significant media attention. The Huffington Post characterized it as being "cringeworthy", and a writer for USA Today's sports blog For The Win described it as being "spectacularly awful". The performance also received poor reception from those involved in the race itself; driver Brad Keselowski remarked that he wanted the band to "just sing the damn song". Track president Joie Chitwood III defended his decision to bring in Madison Rising based on past performances but noted that "[...] our fans are very opinionated and they make sure that they comment, and that's their right."

== Charity performances and partnerships ==
On August 8, 2013, the band played a free concert, opening for Lynyrd Skynyrd and Brantley Gilbert at the 2013 Sturgis Rally.

On April 14, 2015, the Young Marines, a national youth organization, announced a partnership with Madison Rising, kicking off as the band began their Concerned Veterans for America-sponsored "Defend Freedom" Tour.

On November 11, 2015, Madison Rising performed as part of the inaugural Vets Rock concert and expo at Mohegan Sun Arena in Connecticut. Vets Rock is hosted by Til Duty is Done, a Veteran Support foundation focused on assisting veterans with job training, housing and basic life support needs.

On December 8, 2015, Madison Rising performed for an event as part of Wreaths Across America, an organization known for supporting American veterans and fallen warriors, at Saint Bernard School in Connecticut.

== Dave Bray firing and lawsuit ==
In February 2016, Dave Bray was fired as lead singer. A lawsuit filed by the band's management company Purple Eagle Entertainment in November 2016 alleged that Bray "began exhibiting extremely aggressive and violent behavior behind the scenes, including binge drinking, becoming significantly more confrontational with other band members, and with Mgrdechian in particular", including physically assaulting Mgrdechian after Bray became angry that Madison Rising was not invited to perform at the Super Bowl. The lawsuit also accused Bray of exploiting Madison Rising's patriotic image to steal scheduled band performances for himself.

Retired Air Force Master Sergeant Rio Hiett was named Madison Rising's new lead singer in 2018.

== Made 2 Rise ==
Following Richard Mgrdechian's death in 2020, Madison Rising announced in a Facebook post that they would be changing their name to Made 2 Rise. Hiett described the change as "like cooking a hamburger but just a little bit differently ... still the same meaning behind the music, but the way that it's presented is a little different." Made 2 Rise released the EP EP.I.DEMIC in 2021, followed by the full-length album Anomaly in 2022.

In October 2023, Made 2 Rise announced on social media that guitarist Tracy Weller had taken an "indefinite hiatus from the band due to personal reasons".

== Lineup ==
=== Current members ===
- Rio Hiett - lead vocals (2018–present)
- Ted Hile - drums (2019–present)
- Adam Lefevre - bass

=== Former members ===
- Dave Bray - lead vocals (2011-2016)
- Alex Bodnar - guitar/bass
- Chris Schreiner - guitar
- Sam Fishman - drums
- Tom DiPietro - bass
- AJ Larsen - guitar
- Rob Turulli - guitar/bass
- Tracy Weller - guitar

== Discography ==
=== Studio albums ===
- Madison Rising (October 2011)
- American Hero (November 2013)
- Battered Not Broken (February 2017)
- Battered Not Broken, Remastered and Reloaded (September 2018)
- Boots and Roots (July 2020) "Country EP"

=== Singles ===
- "Walking Through That Door"
- "Mirror Don't Lie"
- "Men of Steel"
- "Rebel Yell"
- "War"
- "Where Are You Now"
- "Heaven's Seas"
- "Dangerous"
- "The Star-Spangled Banner"
- "God Bless America"
- "America the Beautiful"

=== EPs ===
- EP.I.DEMIC (2021)

=== Studio albums ===
- Anomaly (2022)
