= Gurian Guitars =

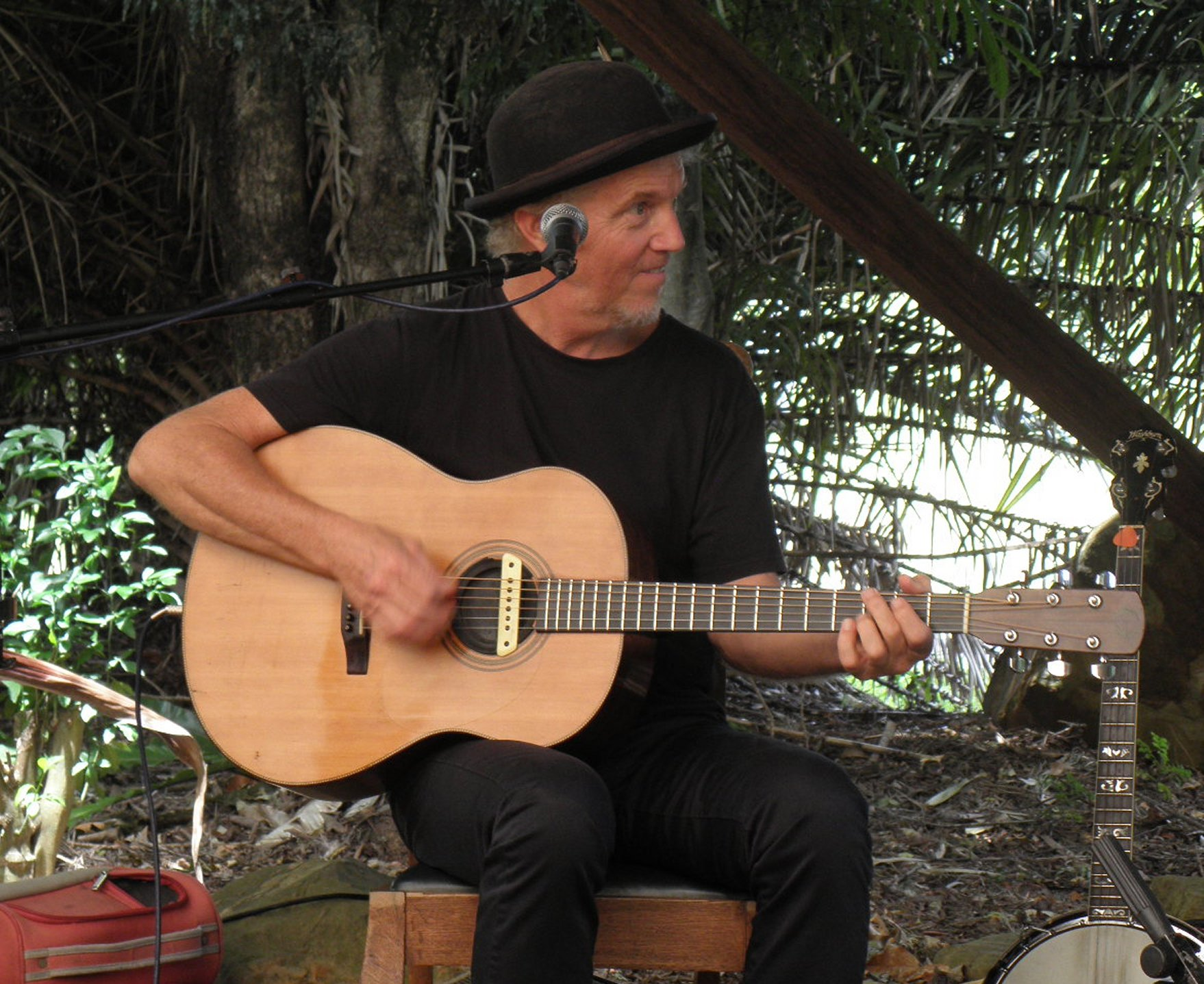
Bill Jacobi (Australian roots musician) on stage with his well travelled Gurian guitar in New South Wales, Australia, January 2018

Gurian Guitars was a manufacturer of high quality acoustic guitars based in New York City, then Hinsdale, New Hampshire and finally West Swanzey, New Hampshire, from the 1960s to 1981. The instruments were designed by luthier Michael Gurian who also supervised production of the instruments bearing his name. The company was one of the earliest "boutique" acoustic guitar makers in the United States, offering an alternative product to those of the larger, factory-based makers of the day, with instruments characterized by a distinctive shape, features and sound.

== History ==
The Gurian Guitar company was founded in around 1965 by luthier Michael Gurian who built first classical then steel string instruments with a number of unique design features including a more rounded body shape than those of other manufacturers, a long scale length, narrow "electric"-style neck (in later years a few instruments were built with a wider fingerboard), and an unusual fan-derived bracing system for the top of the guitar. The earliest guitars were built in various small workshops in New York City, followed by a move to larger premises in Hinsdale, New Hampshire in 1973 where the majority of guitars were built. The company suffered a disastrous fire in its Hinsdale factory in 1979 which resulted in the loss of most of the instrument stock and associated tools, but rebuilt in a new location in West Swanzey, New Hampshire until 1981-2 when it was forced to close due to prevailing economic conditions. Following the cessation of his instrument making operation, Michael Gurian returned to the supply of quality wood supplies and components for other makers, the area in which he originally started.

== Instruments and Dating ==
The main models offered were the Size 2, the Size 3 and the Jumbo steel-string instruments, as well as classical and flamenco models, with back and sides made either in mahogany (suffix "M") or rosewood (suffix "R") (the flamenco model had back and sides of cypress), or more rarely of Brazilian rosewood ("B"), maple ("M") or koa ("K"). Instruments with more deluxe herringbone trim were also denoted by an additional "H" in the model number. Gurian was also one of the first makers to offer a cutaway on an otherwise full size acoustic instrument, to provide enhanced access to the higher frets, a precursor of a very popular trend in later decades.

Gurian instruments were constructed in series as indicated by the prefix to the serial number which can be used to indicate an approximate date. Series A were built in New York City from approximately 1965–1971; series B in Grand Street, New York City from 1972 to 1973; series C in Hinsdale, New Hampshire from 1973 to 1979; and series D in West Swanzey, New Hampshire in 1980–1981, post- the 1979 fire in the Hinsdale factory, until the close of the company. For each series the starting serial number was reset to 1100, thus A1100 - A1471 cover the period approximately 1965–1971; B1100 - B1540 cover the period approximately 1972–1973; C1100 - C4156 cover the period approximately 1973–1979; and D1100 - D2518 cover the period approximately 1980–1981.

== Reputation ==
Gurians were favored at one time by several well-known acoustic players including songwriters Paul Simon and Jackson Browne, also fingerstyle guitar players like Pierre Bensusan, John Renbourn and Ralf Illenberger used Gurian instruments at various times.

Today, with the rise of a large number of alternative/more recent "boutique" brands, they are less frequently seen on stage. They had/have a reputation for good clarity and a distinctive sound, especially for fingerstyle playing. Gurian guitars are comparatively rare. Production totals from the "Gurian Guitars Identification & Registry" indicate that only around 5,000 reached the market (5,283 less approximately 231 lost in the fire), and those that were sold have something of a niche following in the present used guitar market, albeit without the high prices of some of today's top "boutique" brands.

Gurian guitars have a reputation for being challenging with regard to neck resets. The pinned neck joint was designed to be less laborious to construct compared to a traditional dovetail joint, and ironically, thought to be easier to reset. Unfortunately the joint creates several challenges for a repair person; from the specific knowledge of how the joint was put together, the offset as well as a specialised tool.
