= Jeffrey L. Gurian =

American film producer

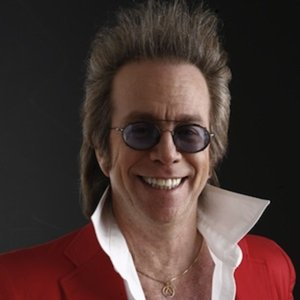
- Born: New York City
- Education: Hunter College and Temple University
- Occupations: Dentist, comedian
- Years active: 1975 to present
- Website: https://comedymatterstv.com/

Jeffrey L. Gurian is an American dentist and comedian.

== Early life ==
Jeffrey Gurian was born on December 29, 1946 in the Bronx borough of New York City to parents Raymond Gurian, a liquor salesman, and Marjorie Gurian. Gurian attended William Taft High School and Hunter College for post-secondary school. After college, Gurian graduated from the Maurice H. Kornberg School of Dentistry at Temple University. There, according to The New York Times, he was "in constant trouble over his coiffure, his clothes and his laid-back lifestyle".

== Dental career ==
After graduation, Gurian became a practicing dentist in the field of cosmetic dentistry, specializing in correcting misshapen teeth caused by birth defects, drugs such as tetracycline or conditions like obsessive teeth grinding. Until 1996, Gurian maintained a dental practice in New York City, in the neighborhood of Marble Hill.

== Comedy career ==
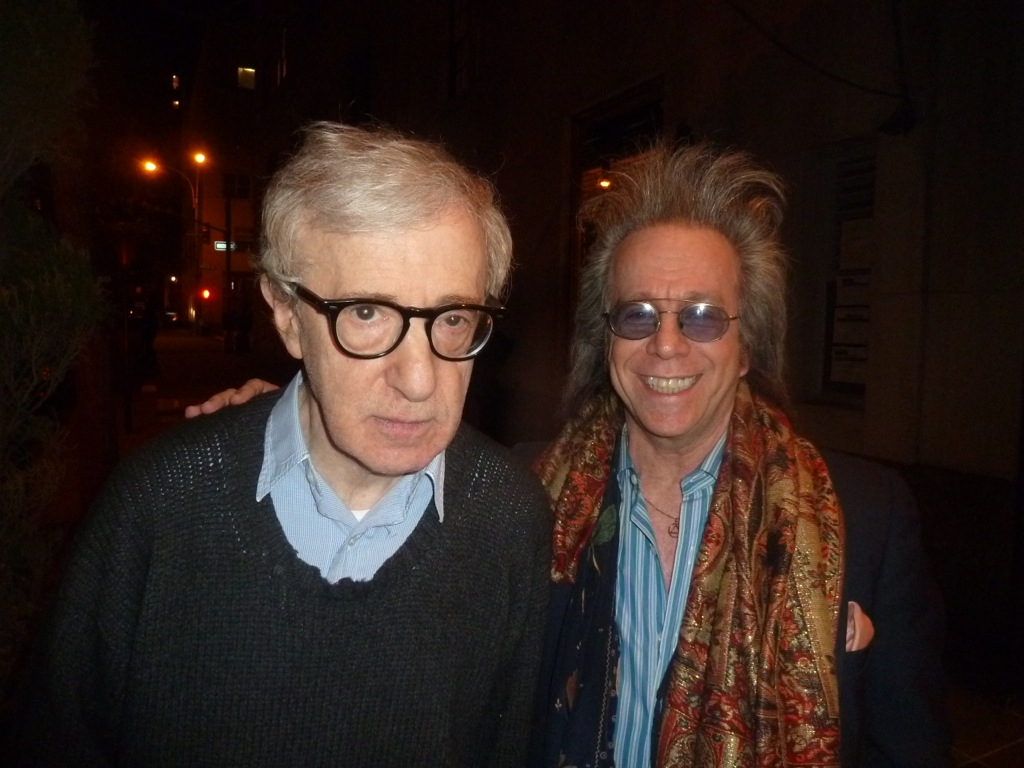
Jeff Gurian with Woody Allen at the Make Em Laugh book release

Gurian has stated that: "From the age of 12, I wanted to be both a dentist and a comedy writer ... No one knows why, not even me, but it might have something to do with my parents who were the only Jewish couple in the Bronx who didn't want a doctor in the family." As a dentist he has toured the United States lecturing on the subject since the 1980s. When asked in 1992 about the balance of his two careers, he wrote: "I am indeed a serious dentist and a serious comedy writer." Early in his career, Gurian wrote jokes performed by comedians including, Dick Capri, Freddie Roman, Dick Shawn, Jerry Lewis, Richard Belzer, Robin Williams, David N. Dinkins and Milton Berle. Berle believed that Gurian has a "great comic sense ... He knows what's funny and what's not, most of the time. I took him under my wing, and gave him the dos and don'ts of what to write and what not to write." Berle also sponsored Gurian's membership in the New York Friars Club. Gurian was introduced to Berle by Rodney Dangerfield, Gurian's employer. Gurian met Dangerfield through his connection to Alan Zweibel of Saturday Night Live, after which Dangerfield used jokes from Gurian on several of Dangerfield's appearances on The Tonight Show Starring Johnny Carson and one of Dangerfield's comedy albums. Gurian has provided jokes the Mayor of New York City, and wrote jokes for stage scripts for Jackie Mason. He also claims to have worked with Phil Hartman and Joan Rivers. In 2013, Gurian was a guest on the comedy talk show Oh, Hello!.

== Publishing ==
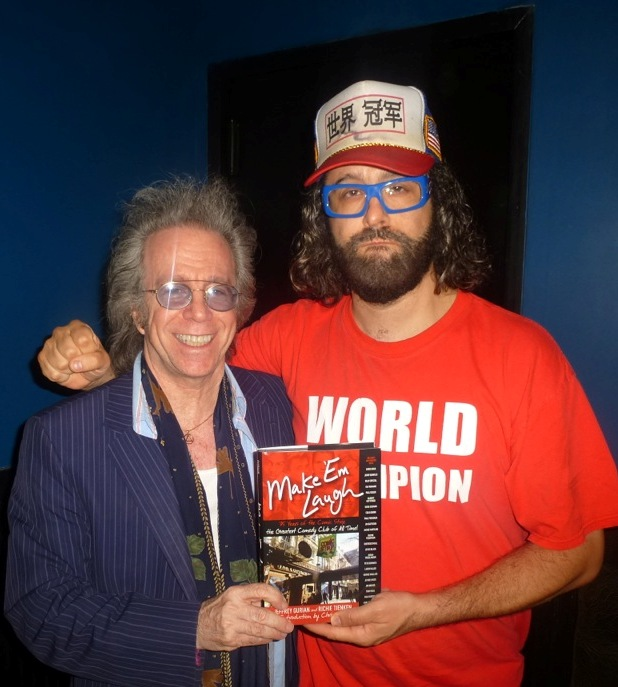
Jeff Gurian with his book Make Em Laugh

Gurian is a former contributor to New York Comedy World, Laugh Spin and Punchline Magazine. He is also the co-author of the book Filthy, Funny and Totally Offensive. In 2013, Gurian released a book entitled Make 'Em Laugh: 35 Years of the Comic Strip, the Greatest Comedy Club of All Time. The book traces the history of the Comic Strip Live comedy club in New York City, from its opening in 1976.

== Film career ==
In 2003, Gurian wrote the short comedy film I Am Woody about a mob boss who survives an attempted assassination, then wakes with amnesia and the believes he is Woody Allen. The film won the Best Short Film award at the 2003 New York International Independent Film and Video Festival and best actor, going to John Glenn Hoyt. In 2012, Gurian co-produced a documentary called The Business of Comedy, which was shown at festivals including the Gold Coast International Film Festival. He has also been a writer for the New York Friars Club roasts of Jerry Stiller, Hugh Hefner and Rob Reiner broadcast on Comedy Central. Gurian is the host of ComedyMatters.TV, a web-series featuring interviews with comedians and film stars at red carpet events. Many of the episodes use the Comedy Strip as the backdrop for the interviews.

== Other work ==
Jeffrey Gurian has served as the head of live comedy programming for the Gold Coast International Film Festival. Gurian has also been interviewed regarding current events in the comedy world by news outlets including ABC News. He appeared on CNN, WPIX News and other TV stations discussing the passing of both Robin Williams and Joan Rivers.
