= Sportsman Channel =

- Country: United States
- Broadcast area: Nationwide
- Headquarters: New Berlin, Wisconsin

Programming
- Language: English
- Picture format: 1080i (HDTV); 480i (SDTV)

Ownership
- Owner: Outdoor Sportsman Group (Kroenke Sports & Entertainment)
- Sister channels: Outdoor Channel; World Fishing Network; Altitude

History
- Launched: April 1, 2003; 23 years ago

Links
- Website: thesportsmanchannel.com

Availability

Terrestrial
- RaiPlay: Channel 1 (SD)

Streaming media
- Service(s): DirecTV Stream, FuboTV, Hulu + Live TV

Sportsman Channel is an American sports-oriented digital cable and satellite television network owned by the Outdoor Sportsman Group subsidiary of Kroenke Sports & Entertainment. The channel is dedicated to programming about outdoor sports, including hunting, shooting and fishing.

As of November 2023, Sportsman is available to approximately 12,000,000 pay television households in the United States-down from its 2015 peak of 34,000,000 households.

== History ==
The channel was launched on April 1, 2003, and was founded by Muskego, Wisconsin businessmen C. Michael Cooley and Todd D. Hansen. In June 2007, the channel was purchased by the InterMedia Outdoor Holdings group, a division of private equity group InterMedia Partners.

Sportsman Channel logo used from 2009 to 2011.

In March 2009, Sportsman Channel appointed InterMedia Outdoor Executive Vice President Willy Burkhardt as the channel's president.

Then, in 2014, Sportsman Channel & its parent company, InterMedia Outdoor Holdings, were acquired by Kroenke Sports & Entertainment, resulting in the company's rename to Outdoor Sportsman Group.

== Programming ==
Programming on Sportsman Channel as of 2014 includes various shows pertaining to hunting (both by archery and through firearms), fishing and firearms. An hour-long condensed version of Cam & Co., a news magazine/talk radio program produced by the National Rifle Association of America for SiriusXM Patriot, airs each weeknight. Most other shows on the channel air in half-hour timeslots. Sportsman Channel also airs infomercials during the overnight hours.

In September 2009, the channel announced it would carry up to 100 original programs on its schedule starting in the fourth quarter of 2009. In March 2014, the channel premiered Amazing America with Sarah Palin, an outdoor program hosted by the former Alaska governor and 2008 Republican vice presidential candidate; the program was renewed for a second season slated to air in early 2015.

== Sportsman Channel HD ==
Sportsman Channel HD is a high definition simulcast feed of Sportsman Channel, that broadcasts in the 1080i resolution format. On January 19, 2010, the channel announced it would launch an HD simulcast feed the following week on January 25 of that year. In February 2010, Dish Network became the first provider to carry the channel's HD feed. The HD feed is now available on various providers including AT&T, Cablevision, and Comcast.

== Carriage ==
DirecTV began carrying the channel on January 21, 2009. AT&T U-verse added it on April 8, 2009. Dish Network started carrying Sportsman Channel on February 10, 2010.

On September 1, 2015, Verizon FiOS removed the channel from the lineup. Spectrum removed the channel from their lineup nationwide on October 30, 2017.

== Former broadcast television affiliates ==
The Sportsman Channel was once available on some broadcast stations. However, when it reached a carriage agreement deal with DirecTV in January 2009, giving it national coverage, it became a cable and satellite only channel.

Call-sign	Channel (analog/digital)	City of license/Market	Owner	Current affiliation	Notes
WLLZ-LP	12/none	Traverse City, Michigan	P & P Cable Holdings	MyNetworkTV (primary) / America One (secondary)	TSC programming formerly aired during the overnight hours, was replaced with Retro Television Network
WMKG-CA	38/none	Muskegon, Michigan	Kelley Enterprises	FamilyNet (primary) / Pursuit Channel (secondary)	Now affiliate of My Family TV
WHSV-DT2 and -DT4	none/3.2 and 3.4	Harrisonburg, Virginia	Gray Television	Fox	Removed, formerly aired overnight
KJLR-LP	28/none	Little Rock, Arkansas	Cowsert Family, LLC	AMGTV	Removed, formerly carried as a secondary affiliation
KDCG-LP	none/22.1	Opelousas, Louisiana	Acadiana Cable Advertising	Retro Television Network	Removed, formerly maintained a dual affiliation with America One; also operates as a Class A digital signal
KSDI-LP	33/none	Fresno, California	Cocola Broadcasting	Pursuit Channel/AMGTV	Removed, replaced with Pursuit Channel
KXGN-TV	none/5	Glendive, Montana	The Marks Group	CBS (primary) / NBC (secondary)	Removed, formerly aired during the overnight hours
KXII-DT2	none/12.2	Sherman, Texas	Gray Television	MyNetworkTV	Formerly carried as a secondary affiliation, removed
KXPX-CA	14/none	Corpus Christi, Texas	GH Broadcasting	Retro Television Network	Former affiliate, replaced with Retro Television Network
WONS-LP	25/none	Olean, New York	Choice Television	America One	Primary affiliation after 2006. The station became WVTT-CA in 2012.
W43BR	43/none	Baraboo, Wisconsin	Baraboo Broadcasting	America One	Former TSC/America One dual-affiliate, now full-time America One affiliate

== See also ==
- Sportsman Channel (Canadian TV channel)
- Pursuit Channel
- NBCSN - general sports network that originated as the Outdoor Life Network (OLN), in association with Outdoor Life magazine
- Outdoor Channel
- MyOutdoorTV.com
