= World Fishing Network =

Cable television channel geared at fishing

- Country: United States; Caribbean
- Broadcast area: National
- Headquarters: Denver, Colorado, U.S.

Programming
- Picture format: 480i (SDTV); 1080i (HDTV)

Ownership
- Owner: Altitude WFN ULC (Kroenke Sports & Entertainment)
- Sister channels: Outdoor Channel; Sportsman Channel; Altitude

History
- Launched: November 2007

Links
- Website: worldfishingnetwork.com

Availability

Streaming media
- Service(s): FuboTV

World Fishing Network (WFN) is an American television network that offers an online and mobile platform dedicated to fishing. It offers a diverse range of programming that includes instruction, tips, tournaments, travel, food boating and outdoor lifestyle content. The network is accessible to viewers in the United States and the Caribbean through cable, satellite, and telecommunication subscriptions.

== History ==
The channel's roots began in Canada on December 2, 2005, when it was launched under the ownership of Insight Sports. The company expanded the channel in the United States in November 2007 with its launch on Verizon FiOS as a standard definition channel. A few months later, in May 2008, WFN launched a high definition (HD) channel on Dish Network, called "World Fishing Network HD", a channel with a separate schedule from its standard definition counterpart. The HD channel was added to Verizon FiOS that year. Since WFN's launch on Verizon and Dish Network, it has been added to several other television providers such as Charter Communications, and television providers in the Caribbean, including Flow Cable in Jamaica.

On January 10, 2011, WFN announced that it had sold a 50% stake in its U.S. operations to Altitude Sports and Entertainment. In 2011, Altitude purchased a 19.9% interest in the Canadian channel through its division Altitude WFN ULC. Altitude would later purchase the remaining 50% interest in the channel.

On January 14, 2019, World Fishing Network in Canada officially relaunched as Sportsman Channel.

== See also ==
- Sportsman Channel (Canadian TV channel)
- Extreme Angler TV
