= Electra (disambiguation) =

Electra, also spelt Elektra, was a daughter of Agamemnon and Clytemnestra in Greek mythology.

Electra or Elektra may also refer to:

== Animals ==
- Electra (bryozoan), a genus of aquatic invertebrates
- Elektra (bug), a genus of insects in the tribe Mirini
- Electra (horse), a Thoroughbred racehorse

== Arts and entertainment ==
=== Comics ===
- Elektra: Assassin (1986), miniseries dedicated to the Marvel character

=== Film ===
- Electra (1962 film), based on the Euripides play
- Elektra (Wednesday Theatre), a 1967 episode of the Australian Anthology series Wednesday Theatre
- Electra, a 1996 Shannon Tweed film
- Elektra (2005 film), based on the Marvel character
- Elektra (2010 film), a Malayalam psychological drama
- Electra (2023 film), a Czech short film by Daria Kashcheeva
- Electra (2024 film), an American and Italian independent film

=== Music ===
==== Groups ====
- Electra (German band), a German prog-rock band
- Electra (band), an electronic musical band from the UK
- Electra (Israeli band), an Israeli rock'n'roll band
- Elektra (band), a pop rock band from Iceland

==== Albums ====
- Electra (album), by Alice Caymmi
- Electra (Arild Andersen album)
- Elektra (Suspekt album), 2011
- Elektra: The Album, the soundtrack to the 2005 film

==== Songs ====
- "Electra" (song), 2009, by heavy metal band Dio
- "Electra", 2024, by British art rock group Public Service Broadcasting

=== Operas ===
- Elektra (opera), by Richard Strauss
- Electra, by Johann Christian Friedrich Hæffner
- Elektra, by Mikis Theodorakis

=== Plays ===
- Electra (Euripides play)
- Electra (Sophocles play)
- Electra (Giraudoux play), 1930
- Electra (Wijesinha play), 1986
- Elektra, by Hugo von Hofmannsthal after Sophocles
- Elektra (started in 1949, first performed 1987), by Ezra Pound and Rudd Fleming
- Electra, 1901, by Benito Pérez Galdós

== Buildings ==
- Electra Building, Vancouver, Canada, a skyscraper
- Electra House, at 84 Moorgate, London, England
- Electra Tower, an office skyscraper in Tel Aviv, Israel
- Electra (San Diego), a condominium tower in downtown San Diego, California, US

== Businesses and brands ==
- Electra (company), an electricity and water company in Cape Verde
- Electra Airways, a Bulgarian airline
- Electra Bicycle Company, an American bicycle company
- Electra Guitars, a brand of imported electric guitar of the '70s and 80s
- Electra Partners Europe, former name of European private equity firm Motion Equity Partners
- Elektra Records, an American record label
- Elektra (stores), a Mexican retail chain
- Grupo Elektra, a Mexican corporation
- Unbound Group, formerly Electra Private Equity, a London-based listed investment trust

== People and fictional and mythological characters ==
- Elektra (name), people and fictional characters with the given name or surname Elektra or variations thereof
- Electra (mythology), several figures from Greek mythology
- Carmen Electra, American actress, model and singer born Tara Leigh Patrick (born 1972)
- Dorian Electra, American singer and songwriter born Dorian Electra Fridkin Gomberg (born 1992)
- Justine Electra, Australian musician born Justine Beatty (born c. 1978)

== Places ==
=== Terrestrial features ===
- Mount Electra
- Electra Lake
- Electra Peak

=== Outer space ===
- Electra (star), 17 Tauri
- 130 Elektra, an asteroid

=== Municipalities ===
- Electra, Texas
- Electra, Queensland, a locality in the Bundaberg Region, Queensland, Australia

== Technology ==
- Electra, an iOS jailbreak app
- Electra (radio), a telecommunications transceiver for Mars spacecraft
- Electra (satellite), a project for a communications satellite with all-electric propulsion
- Electra (teletext), a teletext service from the early 1980s to the early 1990s
- Electra, a satellite also known as Explorer-1 Prime
- ELECTRA, a variant of the language model BERT
- Elektra, a navigation system developed from the Lorenz beam
- Elektra (layout engine)

== Transportation ==
=== Aircraft ===
- Lockheed L-188 Electra, an American turboprop airliner built by Lockheed
- Lockheed Model 10 Electra, a twin-engine, all-metal monoplane airliner from the 1930s
- Lockheed Model 12 Electra Junior, an eight-seat, six-passenger all-metal twin-engine transport aircraft of the late 1930s
- Lockheed Model 14 Super Electra, a civil cargo and passenger aircraft

=== Motor vehicles ===
- Buick Electra, full-size premium automobiles built by the Buick division of General Motors
- Harley-Davidson Electra Glide, a motorcycle in the FL model series since 1965

=== Rail ===
- Electra, an express electric locomotive of the type British Rail Class 77 built in 1953 for the Woodhead Line
- British Rail Class 91 electric locomotive (early codename "Electra")
- Electra, a Great Western Railway Firefly class 2-2-2 locomotive

=== Ships ===
- HMS Electra, five ships of the UK Royal Navy
- SS Electra, a cargo ship which was renamed USS Keresan
- USS Electra, two ships of the U.S. Navy
- HS Elektra, a Hungarian steamship

== Other uses ==
- Elektra Berlin, a German association football club
- Electra High School
- Electra (arts organisation), a London-based non-profit arts organisation
- Electra (typeface), a serif typeface

== See also ==
- Electra complex, a psychiatric concept
- Electra-Afikim, an Israeli bus company
- Elecktra, drag performer
- Électre, a 1782 opera by Jean-Baptiste Lemoyne on the myth of Electra
