= Elektra (stores) =

Mexican retail chain

Elektra, S.A.B. de C.V.
- Type: Private
- Industry: Retail
- Founded: 1950
- Founder: Hugo Salinas Price
- Headquarters: Mexico, Mexico City
- Key people: Hugo Salinas Price (founder); Ricardo Salinas Pliego (president)
- Products: Mobile Devices, Appliances, Toys, Motorcycles, Forniture
- Brands: Italika; Banco Azteca
- Website: Official website

Elektra is a Mexican retail chain founded in 1950 by Hugo Salinas Price in Mexico City. The company is part of Grupo Elektra and has nearly 1,300 locations across Mexico, Guatemala, and Honduras. Elektra offers a variety of products, including household appliances, computer systems, consumer electronics, mobile phones, motorcycles, furniture, toys, and money transfer services.

== History ==
=== Origins ===
The company was founded in 1950 by businessman Hugo Salinas Price as a small appliance store in Monterrey, Nuevo León. Elektra became the first company to produce televisions for the Mexican market. Later, it introduced a monthly-payment plan as part of its service offerings.

In 1956, the company opened its first retail store. Over time, new locations for public access began to open, and additional products like furniture and home accessories were added to its catalog. Due to the decrease of wholesale sale, the company shifted its focus to a retail model.

=== Expansion ===
After applying for credit from foreign banks in the early 1960s, the company increased its sales by 40%, expanded the variety of products in its catalog, and extended its operations nationwide. By 1964, the company already operated sixteen stores. Under Hugo Salinas Price's leadership, Elektra grew to 59 points of sale in Mexico.

In the mid-1980s, Hugo Salinas Price passed the management of the company to his son, Ricardo Salinas Pliego, who became Elektra's president in 1987. Since then, the company has expanded internationally, opening branches in several Central and South American countries (which later closed). In 1999, Elektra acquired 94.3% of the capital of Salinas y Rocha, a store chain founded in 1906 by Benjamín Salinas Westrup, through an auction.

To capitalize on the e-commerce sector, Elektra restructured its online store in 2017, transforming it into an e-commerce platform. A year later, the company was awarded the title of e-commerce leader in retail in Mexico by the Mexican Association of Online Sales (AMVO) and the Latin American Institute of Electronic Commerce (eCommerce Institute).

=== Present ===
In 2022, Elektra ranked 73rd on Expansión magazine's list of the 500 most important companies in Mexico. A year later, it was included in Time magazine's ranking of the best companies in the world, compiled in partnership with the data provider Statista.

According to the 2022 annual report, the company operates 1,275 points of contact, with 1,167 located in Mexico and 108 in Guatemala and Honduras. It also has twelve distribution centers in Mexico and seven in Central America.

== Products and services ==
Elektra initially focused on the sale of radio and television equipment, but over time, it expanded its product and service portfolio. At the present, it specializes in household appliances, consumer electronics, furniture, motorcycles, mobile phones, toys, computer systems, bicycles, electronic funds transfers, extended warranties, and more. According to official company data, Elektra sells nearly 1 in 4 televisions, 1 in 5 refrigerators, and 7 out of 10 motorcycles in Mexico.

Elektra's products primarily target the C and D+ segments of the population, representing middle to lower-income groups, while the products offered by the Salinas & Rocha chain target the C+ and C socioeconomic levels.

== Sustainability and ethical values ==
As part of Grupo Salinas, in 2018, Elektra joined the United Nations Global Compact, committing to its ten principles in areas such as human rights, labor, the environment, and anti-corruption. According to official data, the company has invested 113 million Mexican pesos in environmental management, with 35% of the energy used in its processes coming from renewable sources. Elektra also adopted the recommendations of the Task Force on Climate-related Financial Disclosures for the "analysis of climate change risks and opportunities". In 2022, Elektra was recognized with the Socially Responsible Company (ESR, by its Spanish acronym) distinction, awarded by the Mexican Center for Philanthropy (CEMEFI, by its Spanish acronym).

Elektra has worked closely with the Fundación Azteca campaign, a corporate social responsibility organization founded in 1997 by Grupo Salinas, on various social outreach and environmental protection programs in Mexico and Central America.

== Rankings ==
=== MERCO (2024) ===
- Elektra entered the list of the 100 companies with the best corporate reputation in Mexico for the first time, ranking 98th, in the Corporate Reputation Business Monitor (in Spanish: MERCO-Monitor Empresarial de Reputación Corporativa).

=== FXC Intelligence ===
- Elektra, as part of Grupo Elektra, was recognized for its global leadership in remittances with its inclusion in FXC Intelligence's Top 100.

== Awards and Distinctions ==
Year	Award and/or Organizer	Category	Ref.
2018	eCommerce Awards Mexico	Leading eCommerce retailer in Mexico	
2020	Great Place to Work	Part of the list of the best companies to work for in Mexico	
2022	ESR Distinctive	Part of the list of the leading companies in sustainability	
2022	Expansión Magazine	Part of the list of the most important companies in Mexico	
2023	Time (magazine) and Statista	Part of the list of the World's Best Companies in 2023	
2023	Merco Talent Ranking	Part of the list of companies with the greatest ability to attract and retain talent	
2023	Merco Companies and Leaders Ranking	Part of the list of the top 10 self-service and departmental companies	
2024	AMCO	Elektra received the AMCO Award in the Communication Strategy category for the campaign “Y fuimos felices”.	
2024	AMCO	Elektra received the AMCO Award in the Communication Execution category for the campaign “Y fuimos felices”.	
2024	AMCO	Elektra received the AMCO Award in the Internal Communication Strategy category for the campaign “Capitalízate de elektra.mx”.	
