= Panama Papers and North America =

Countries with politicians, public officials or close associates implicated in the leak on April 15, 2016 (As of May 19, 2016)

The Panama Papers are 11.5 million leaked documents that detail financial and attorney–client information for more than 214,488 offshore entities. The files were uncovered and exposed by the International Consortium of Investigative Journalists, the German newspaper Süddeutsche Zeitung and other news organizations. The documents, some dating back to the 1970s, were created by, and taken from, Panamanian law firm and corporate service provider Mossack Fonseca, and were leaked in 2015 by an anonymous source.

This page details related allegations, reactions, and investigations, in North America.

== Canada ==
Former Canadian prime minister Justin Trudeau has denied any involvement in the affair, saying he had "entirely and completely been transparent about mine and my family's finances. That is something I learned early on that Canadians expect from their leaders." Canada Revenue Agency said in a statement that its current tax evasion audits include "some Canadian clients associated with law firm Mossack Fonseca," and added that it would "communicate" with its treaty partners to obtain any further information that may not currently be in its possession." The CRA has tax treaties with 92 different countries and 22 Tax Information Exchange Agreements. The CRA has begun or completed 116 audits and 234 more are planned. These investigations are expected to recoup at least $11 million in taxes and fines. Fewer than 10 related criminal investigations are in progress.

The Royal Bank of Canada (RBC) denied any wrongdoing associated with the 370+ clients it had referred to Mossack Fonseca over the years."We have an extensive due diligence process... RBC works within the legal and regulatory framework of every country in which we operate," said a bank spokesman. CEO David McKay said the bank will review the four decades of documentation for any problems. CEO Bill Downe of the Bank of Montreal said "Canadian banks have 'dramatically' beefed up anti-money laundering control over the last seven to 10 years," and added that any link between Canadian businesses and the Panama Papers companies would have originated a long time ago, before Canadian banks took action to stop money laundering.

Some individuals did surface in the leaked documents, according to ICIJ partner in the investigation Toronto Star.

- John Mark Wright, a mutual fund broker, had three shell companies in the British Virgin Islands for handling profits from a mine in the Democratic Republic of Congo.
- Eric Van Nguyen, a Montreal resident with registered companies in Samoa and another in the British Virgin Islands. He also faces fraud charges in the New York state in a penny stock scheme.
- Brian Shamess, a sports physician from Sault Ste Marie, used a Mossack Fonseca company to buy a condo on Panama Bay in 2011.
- Eric Marc Levine operates fitness clubs in Asia and has registered at least 15 companies in the British Virgin Islands through Mossack Fonseca. The Thai Anti-Money Laundering Office froze some of his business assets following fraud allegations; Levine responded with a defamation suit.
- Former Newfoundland Cabinet minister Chuck Furey incorporated in Panama to buy a condo in 2008. He said no longer has overseas holdings.

Canadians for Tax Fairness had calculated that legal tax avoidance by corporations alone cost the Canadian treasury almost $8 billion Canadian a year. When it calculated the 2015 numbers, they found that corporations and individuals combined sent CAN$40 billion of declared assets to tax havens, and the ten most popular alone now held $270 billion Canadian in assets.

== Costa Rica ==
The administration of President Luis Guillermo Solís suggested that some of the activity unveiled by the leaked documents points to attempts to evade taxes. His administration's effort to implement tax increases and reforms has met strong resistance from opposition and business figures.

Leaked documents suggest that Mossack Fonseca helped tuna export company Borda Azul set up a shell company in the British Virgin Islands in order to avoid Costa Rican taxes. The firm, now out of business, was headed by Hermes Navarro, president of the Costa Rican Football Federation from 1999 to 2006. In the late 1990s the Finance Ministry and Prosecutor's Office investigated Borda Azul and other export companies for allegedly misusing tax credit certificates; in 1997 dozens of companies had been accused of using the certificates for fraud and to launder drug profits.

According to ICIJ investigative partners DataBaseAR and Seminario Universidad, Mossack Fonseca helped Borda Azul fabricate invoices to allow it to report both inflated costs—to reduce its taxes—and inflated exports, to allow it to continue to qualify for the tax credit certificates. In a letter dated October 19, 1998, a Mossack Fonseca lawyer explained the investigation to the Panama City office and concluded:

In the worst of circumstances, being very fatalistic, the Costa Rican government could, after years of investigation, suspend the transfer of CATs to Borda Azul for irregularities but never send anyone to jail.

— a Mossack Fonseca lawyer

More than thirty Costa Rican law firms are mentioned in the Panama Papers as referring clients to Mossack Fonseca, resulting in the creation of more than 360 shell companies. in particular Gonzalo Fajardo & Asociados, founded by former Finance Ministry official and later Economy Minister Gonzalo Fajardo Salas, and over nearly two decades helped Costa Rican companies set up 82 offshore corporations in tax havens, according to DataBaseAR.

Finance Vice Minister Fernando Rodríguez said Costa Rica will push to sign a Tax Information Exchange Agreement with Panama. Legislators from several parties are trying to line up political consensus to seek approval of the administration's tax fraud bill and to form a legislative commission to investigate those named in the Panama Papers, according to Emilia Molina Cruz of the Citizens' Action Party. While opposition parties have maintained that the country's financial problems stem from excess spending, according to the Finance Department, the sums Costa Rica loses to tax evasion equal about 8% of the country's gross domestic product, while its deficits have run at about 6%.

== Mexico ==
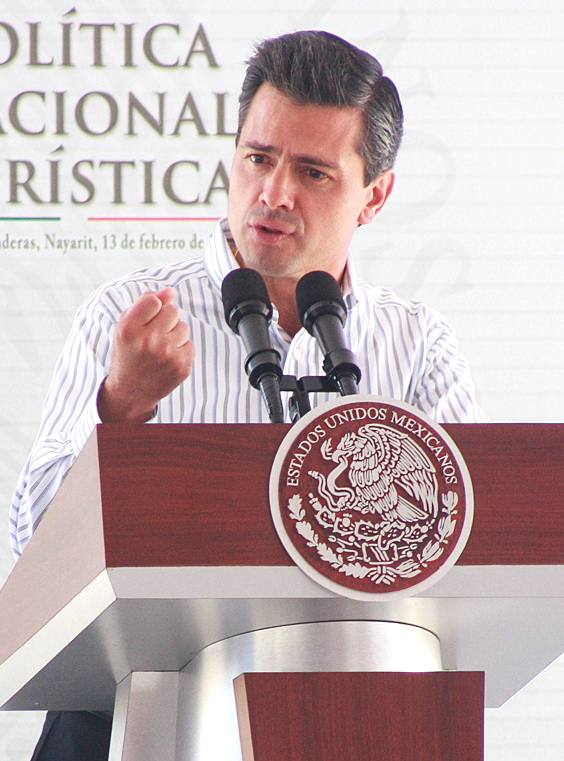
The leaked files identified the "favourite contractor" of former Mexican President Enrique Peña Nieto.

Aristóteles Núñez, in charge at the time of the government's tax administration, Servicio de Administración Tributaria, said that people involved in the Panama Papers case can still make tax declarations and pay taxes on their investments. Being Mexican and having foreign investments or bank accounts is not a crime, but having income and not declaring it is illegal. If investments are categorized as tax evasion, fines of up to 100% of the omitted tax payment can result, as well as three months to nine years imprisonment.

- Mexican actress Edith González is linked to the scandal through her husband Lorenzo Lazo Margáin.
- Ricardo Salinas Pliego, president of Grupo Salinas, which includes Azteca, Banco Azteca and Azteca Foundation among others, used an offshore company set up in the Virgin Islands to purchase a yacht, Azteca II, flagged in the Cayman Islands. Felicitas Holdings Limited, registered in the British Virgin Islands, spent £261 million in 2014 on art by Francisco de Goya and also bought works by Mexican painter Manuel Serrano; the press director of Grupo Salinas told Forbes that all of Pliego's transactions complied with the law.
- Juan Armando Hinojosa Cantú, a close friend of former Mexican president Enrique Peña Nieto, enlisted Mossack Fonseca to create trusts for accounts worth US$100 million after he was investigated for allegedly giving special favours to the former Mexican president and his wife, according to an analysis by ICIJ, who said that the documents showed "a complex offshore network" of nine companies in New Zealand, the United Kingdom, and the Netherlands. Described as Peña Nieto's "favorite contractor", Hinojosa's companies have won more than eighty government contracts and received at least US$2.8 billion in state money, The New York Times reported last year.

According to Forbes, "Hinojosa and other prominent Mexicans, mostly businessmen with close ties to the government, including at least one member of the Forbes billionaires list, were the subject of extensive articles published online by ICIJ investigation partners Proceso and Aristegui Noticias Sunday." Proceso also said that the Mexicans mentioned in the leaked documents included individuals linked to drug cartels.

== Trinidad and Tobago ==
The Panama Papers linked Ken Emrith, a member of the opposition United National Congress (UNC), to a bribery scandal in Brazil using Panamanian shell companies that were used to transfer millions of US dollars to offshore bank accounts. The Brazilian construction company Grupo OAS was awarded a contract in 2011 through the National Infrastructure Development Company (NIDCO) by the People's Partnership administration to build a highway in Trinidad for TT$5.2 billion. (Note: TT$1~US$0.16 as of April 15, 2016.) The highway is 49% complete, but it is now estimated that the highway will cost TT$8 billion when done. Investigators have found that Emirth's companies received $6 million from NIDCO and that Emirth was also a director of Pembury Consultants (Trinidad and Tobago) Limited, which OAS hired on the highway project as a consultant at $44,800 a month. Through May 2013 OAS paid Pembury at least TT$896,000; totals beyond that date are not currently available.

Emrith, described as a low-level UNC party official, had a second Mossack Fonseca company, Pendrey Associates. Speaking in Parliament, Attorney General Faris Al-Rawi said the leaked documents tied this offshore company to key players in the Petrobras scandal in Brazil, including the convicted Joao Procopio, and Jose Luiz Pires of Queluz, who had dealings with Swiss PKB Privatbank AG. Pires is under investigation, he said.

According to ICIJ investigative partner Trinidad Express, Emrith was a close associate of Jack Warner and also owns half the shares in Proteus Holding SA, an investment he declines to answer questions about because he says he has a responsibility of confidentiality to fellow shareholders. The Express also says that OAS used a Namibian port development project as camouflage for a $1 million payment from Procopio shell company Santa Tereza Services Ltd to Emirth.

== United States ==
President Barack Obama was critical of Caribbean tax havens in his 2008 election campaign. In 2010, the United States implemented the Foreign Account Tax Compliance Act, which required financial firms around the world to report accounts held by US citizens to the Internal Revenue Service.

The US is not a signatory to the Common Reporting Standard set up by the Organisation for Economic Co-operation and Development, alongside Vanuatu and Bahrain.

At least 2,400 US-based clients were documented in the papers; while many of their transactions were legal, Mossack Fonseca offered advice to many of its US clients on how to evade US tax and financial disclosure laws. On 7 February 2020, federal prosecutors announced that they would get their first conviction in relation to the disclosures. On 18 February 2020, Harald Joachim von der Goltz, an 82-year-old former businessman and former U.S. resident who was a client for Mossack Fonseca, pleaded guilty to nine counts, including charges of conspiracy to evade taxes and commit money laundering and wire fraud. He was the first person to plead guilty in the US in connection to the Panama Papers leak. On February 28, 2020, a Massachusetts accountant, Richard Gaffey, became the second person to plead guilty to charges related to the Panama Papers. Judgments against both von der Goltz and Gaffey were delivered in September 2020 in the United States District Court for the Southern District of New York, resulting in 87 months imprisonment and over $17.7 million in asset forfeitures, restitutions, and fines between the two defendants.

=== Panama Free Trade Agreement ===
The Panama Free Trade Agreement, supported by President Obama and then-Secretary of State Clinton, has been criticized by watchdog groups for enabling the practices detailed within the Panama Papers through regulatory oversight. However, an Obama administration official said the argument has "zero merit". John Cassidy of The New Yorker, said the Panama Free Trade Agreement actually forced Panama to release information to the American regulatory authorities on "the ownership of companies, partnerships, trusts, foundations, and other persons".

=== After the leak ===
President Barack Obama addressed the overseas shell companies listed by the leak in a press conference: "It's not that they're breaking the laws," he said, "it's that the laws are so poorly designed that they allow people, if they've got enough lawyers and enough accountants, to wiggle out of responsibilities that ordinary citizens are having to abide by." Although no leader in the US was mentioned in the Panama Papers, Obama said that "Frankly, folks in America are taking advantage of the same stuff."

Senators Sherrod Brown and Elizabeth Warren have requested that the Treasury Department investigate any US-linked companies that appeared in the leaks, in addition to the Justice Department, given its role in the financial markets.

Former Secretary of State and 2016 Democratic presidential candidate Hillary Clinton condemned "outrageous tax havens and loopholes ... in Panama and elsewhere" at a Pennsylvania AFL–CIO event. Clinton added that "some of this behavior is clearly against the law, and everyone who violates the law anywhere should be held accountable", but it was "scandalous how much is actually legal". Clinton promised that "We are going after all these scams and make sure everyone pays their fair share here in America."

Manhattan US Attorney Preet Bharara opened a criminal investigation on matters related to the Panama Papers and sent a letter April 3 to the International Consortium of Investigative Journalists (ICIJ) saying his office "would greatly appreciate the opportunity to speak as soon as possible." The ICIJ received many such requests from many countries and ICIJ Director Gerard Ryle has said its policy is not to turn over any materials.

New York's Department of Financial Services has asked 13 foreign banks, including Deutsche Bank AG, Credit Suisse Group AG, Commerzbank AG, ABN Amro Group NV and Societe Generale SA, for information about their dealings with Mossack Fonseca. The banks are not accused of wrongdoing but must provide telephone logs and records of other transactions between their New York branches and the law firm.

=== Americans ===
McClatchy Newspapers initially found four Americans with offshore shell companies named in the documents. All had previously been either accused or convicted of financial crimes such as fraud or tax evasion. An article by BBC provides three reasons to explain the scarcity of Americans in the leak:

- Shell companies can be created in the United States.
- Major international banks based in America tend to have offshore accounts in the Cayman Islands instead.
- US laws like the Foreign Account Tax Compliance Act (FATCA) and the Tax Information Exchange Agreements (TIEAs) of 2010 have meant that the "tax evasion game [was] principally over for American taxpayers".

Asked about the paucity of American individuals in the documents, digital editor of Süddeutsche Zeitung, Stefan Plöchinger, said via Twitter: "Just wait for what is coming next." Plöchinger later clarified that he was just advocating not jumping to conclusions. Copies of at least 200 American passports – indicating that their owners applied for banking services – have been discovered in the Papers, but no US politicians have yet been named in the leak. Some Americans mentioned include:

- Puerto Rican recording artist Ramón Luis Ayala, better known as Daddy Yankee, appears in the leaked documents.
- CEO and then Chairman of Citibank (1998–2006) Sanford I. Weill appears in the documents as sole shareholder of April Fool, a company based in the British Virgin Islands that managed a yacht of the same name from 2001 to 2005. Weill's second company, Brightao, includes Chinese and American investors and holds share in a Chinese insurance and risk-management firm, Mingya Insurance Brokers.
- Jerry Slusser, a fundraiser for Republican Mitt Romney, initially said he did not recall opening an offshore company, but then called his accountant and said it was for an investment in Hong Kong that eventually showed a loss.
- Donors to former US President Bill Clinton and former Secretary of State Hillary Clinton, including Marc Rich and Ng Lap Seng.
- Central Intelligence Agency operatives. A number of "front" companies and contractors for the CIA used "offshore companies for personal and private gain," as well as employing them as instruments for their official work as "spy chiefs, secret agents, or operatives."

== See also ==
- Bank secrecy
- Bank Secrecy Act
- Tax shelter
- The Laundromat (2019)
