= Elettra (disambiguation) =

ELETTRA is a research centre in Italy.

Elettra may also refer to:

- Elettra (album), 2009 album by Carmen Consoli
- Italian ship Elettra (A5340)
- Elettra (1904 ship)

People

- Elettra de Col (born 1987), Italian curler
- Elettra Lamborghini (born 1994), Italian TV personality in Geordie Shore and Super Shore
- Elettra Rossellini Wiedemann (born 1983), American food writer
- Elettra Stamboulis (born 1969), writer and educator
- Elettra, character in Mozart's opera Idomeneo

== See also ==
- Electra (disambiguation) and Electra (Greek mythology)
