= Movil@ccess =

Mexican company

Movil@ccess logo

Movil@access was a Mexican company owned by Grupo Salinas that offered two-way paging services. The company was listed on the Bolsa Mexicana de Valores (BMV: MOVILAB) and its chief executive officer was Gustavo Guzmán.

Movil@ccess paging service covered Mexico and, through Arch Wireless, the United States by roaming. It also offered telemarketing services and Premium-rate telephone numbers.
