= Heather Tom =

American actress and director (born 1975)

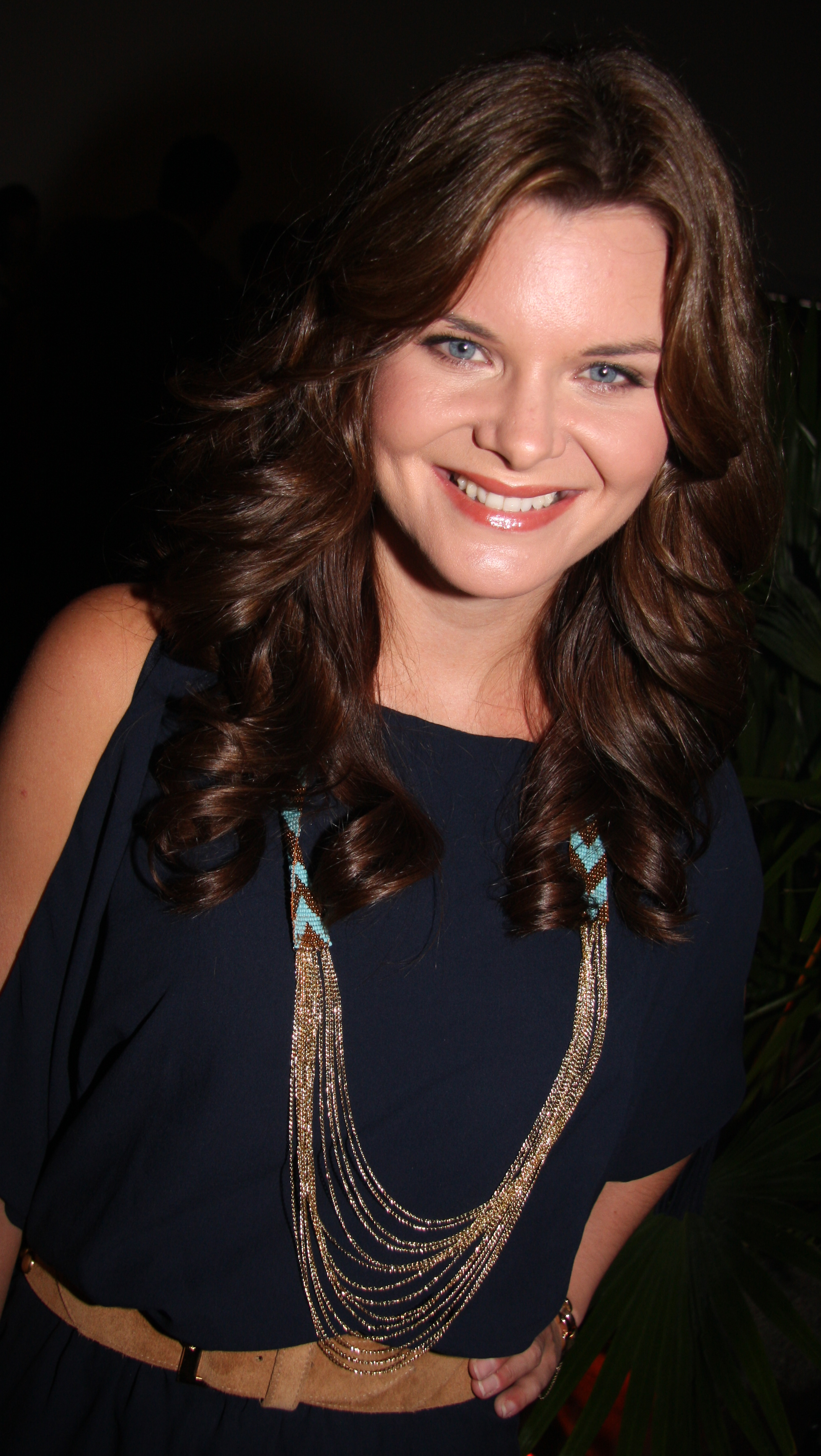
- Tom in June 2009
- Born: November 4, 1975 (age 50); Hinsdale, Illinois, U.S.
- Occupations: Actress; television director
- Years active: 1989–present
- Spouse: James Achor (m. 2011)
- Children: 1
- Relatives: David Tom (brother); Nicholle Tom (sister)
- Website: heathertom.com

Heather Tom (born November 4, 1975) is an American actress and director. She is best known for her roles as Victoria Newman on The Young and the Restless (1990 to 2003), Kelly Cramer on One Life to Live and All My Children (2003 to 2006), and Katie Logan on The Bold and the Beautiful (2007 to present). On The Bold and the Beautiful she has earned four Daytime Emmy Awards and a total of six in her career, tying her for the most wins by a soap actress. In addition to her acting work, she has directed episodes of The Bold and the Beautiful, The Young and the Restless, Dynasty, and Good Trouble.

== Early life ==
Tom was born in Hinsdale, Illinois. She is the oldest of three children. Her younger siblings are twins David Tom and Nicholle Tom, who are also actors. Her brother played Billy Abbott on The Young and the Restless and also co-starred with her on One Life to Live as her half brother, Paul Cramer. In 2000, she and David became the first brother and sister nominated for Daytime Emmy Awards in the same year. Tom guest-starred with her sister on The Wedding Bells in 2007 and Hollywood Darlings in 2017.

When Tom was eleven, her family moved from Chicago, Illinois to Seattle, Washington, because her father's work transferred him. A year later, her mother brought the three children to Los Angeles for pilot season. They decided to stay there permanently, with Tom's father remaining in Seattle and her parents divorcing. Her mother got a job as a speech therapist for the Pasadena school system, while the children auditioned for acting roles.

While in Seattle, Tom performed at the Seattle Children's Theatre and the Pacific Northwest Ballet and studied piano at the Academy of Music and Dance. After moving to California, she studied at the Lee Strasberg Theatre and Film Institute and the Young Actors Space. At age fourteen, she took a part time job baking cookies at a store in Los Angeles called Hungry Bear Cookies. She became emancipated from her parents while she was a teen.

== Career ==
=== 1977–1996: Early work and The Young and the Restless ===
Tom's acting career began at the age of two with television commercials and modeling. On stage, she spent a summer performing in a West Coast tour of Pinocchio II for Center Stage USA. After moving to Los Angeles, she landed guest-starring roles on Who's the Boss?, Kids Incorporated, Divorce Court, and Trial by Jury. Tom played Caroline in the ABC movie She'll Take Romance.

She debuted as Victoria Newman on the CBS soap opera The Young and the Restless in December 1990. Tom won her first Daytime Emmy Award for Outstanding Younger Actress in a Drama Series in 1993. She was also nominated in the same category in 1994. She received Young Artist Award nominations in 1993 and 1994.

In 1995, she guest starred as herself in an episode of Diagnosis: Murder. She starred as Kathy Acton in the CBS movie Deadly Whispers, co-starring with Tony Danza and Ving Rhames. For her role on The Young and the Restless, she received Daytime Emmy Award nominations for Outstanding Younger Actress in 1995 and also 1996.

=== 1996–2001: Theatre work ===
Tom co-founded the Creative Outlet Theater in Los Angeles with actor Chad Allen, producing and starring in Out of Gas on Lover's Leap and Vanities. She also produced the play Scooter Thomas Makes it to the Top of the World. In 1996, Tom and Allen produced Biloxi Blues for the theater. She starred as Daisy in the play, alternating the role with her sister, Nicholle Tom. The production earned five Drama-Logue Awards.

Tom briefly left The Young and the Restless in February 1997 and returned several months later, with the role temporarily recast with Sarah Aldrich during her absence. Tom won a Soap Opera Digest Award for Outstanding Younger Lead Actress in 1997. She received Daytime Emmy Award nominations for Outstanding Younger Actress in 1997 and 1998.

On July 31, 1998, she began a one-month run in The Glass Menagerie at The Stella Adler Theatre in Los Angeles. Tom starred as Laura, with Barbara Babcock co-starring as Amanda. From September 9-November 15, 1998, she starred in Gila at The Odyssey Theater in Los Angeles, co-starring with Phyllis Frelich. She received a Robbie Theatre LA Award nomination for Best Actress for her role in the play. Tom won her second Daytime Emmy Award for Outstanding Younger Actress for her role on The Young and the Restless in 1999. She received a nomination in the same category in 2000.

In August 2001, Tom starred on stage as Betsy in Lemonade, a four-person comedy, at the Tamarind Theater in Los Angeles. She co-starred with Maxwell Caulfield.

=== 2003–2006: One Life to Live ===
Tom decided to leave The Young and the Restless, airing for the last time on December 17, 2003. She cited creative differences as her reason for leaving. Tom joined the cast of the ABC soap opera One Life to Live as Kelly Cramer, first airing December 11, 2003. She was involved in a crossover storyline with All My Children, making appearances on that show.

In May 2004, Tom made her Broadway debut in Prymate (previously titled Gila). The play opened at the Longacre Theatre for a brief run in May 2004. She starred in a stage production of Proof at Montclair State University's TheatreFest. Tom also had a role in Moonchild at the Access Theater, as part of New York International Fringe Festival in August 2004. She played Chrysothemis in a free staged reading of Electra at the New York Public Library for the Performing Arts. In October 2004, Tom starred in a production of Hecuba at 45 Bleecker Theatre.

On television, Tom made a guest appearance on Law & Order: Special Victims Unit. She starred on stage as Jenn in Happy Hour at 12 Miles West in Bloomfield, New Jersey. The play opened in May 2005. She appeared in the short films Beyond the Ladies Room Door and Delusion.

Tom received a Daytime Emmy Award nomination for Outstanding Supporting Actress for her role on One Life to Live in 2005. She appeared in the film Undone, produced by her One Life to Live co-star Kassie DePaiva and directed by James DePaiva. The film co-starred Timothy D. Stickney, Forbes March, and Ricky Paull Goldin. In November and December 2006, she starred on stage as Marilyn Monroe in The Secret Letters of Jackie and Marilyn at the Pittsburgh Public Theater.

Tom decided to leave One Life to Live, last airing December 14, 2006. She received a Daytime Emmy Award nomination for Outstanding Supporting Actress for her role on OLTL in 2007.

=== 2006–2013: The Bold and the Beautiful ===
Tom appeared in the short film When We're Old and Love Means Nothing. She played Jennifer Adams in the 2006 thriller film The Rival, co-starring with Tracy Nelson. In 2007, Tom guest starred on The Wedding Bells with her sister Nicholle Tom. She also guest starred on Monk. Tom played Marsha in the film City Teacher.

In 2007, it was announced that she would be joining The Bold and the Beautiful as Katie Logan. Her first airdate was August 30, 2007. Tom had a recurring role on Ugly Betty in 2008. She played Lexi in the 2010 film Suicide Dolls. She also appeared in the films Stiffs and The Putt Putt Syndrome. She guest starred on The Mentalist, Criminal Minds, and Rizzoli & Isles.

For her role on The Bold and the Beautiful, Tom won a Daytime Emmy Award for Outstanding Supporting Actress in a Drama Series in 2011, after being nominated in the same category in 2008. She won the Daytime Emmy Award for Outstanding Lead Actress in a Drama Series in 2012 and 2013. Tom starred on stage as Catherine in The Heiress at the Pasadena Playhouse in April and May 2012. She co-starred with Richard Chamberlain.

=== 2013–present: Directing and other work ===
Tom and husband James Achor started a design business, Tight Rope Designs, redecorating several homes in the Los Angeles area. Their work was featured in InStyle and Elle Decor magazines. In the summer of 2013, they starred in a reality TV miniseries for HGTV, Renovation Unscripted. In 2014, Tom co-starred with her sister, Nicholle Tom, and Sonia Satra in a national tour of the play Vanities. For her role on The Bold and the Beautiful, she received another Daytime Emmy Award nomination for Outstanding Lead Actress.

She played Officer Victoria in the 2016 horror film Little Dead Rotting Hood. She had a recurring role on Lucifer and guest starred on Unforgettable. Tom played Anna Garrett in the 2017 Lifetime film Mommy, I Didn't Do It. She guest starred with her sister, Nicholle Tom, on Hollywood Darlings. In 2019, Tom played Marilyn Bishop in the horror film Animal Among Us.

Tom received Daytime Emmy Award nominations in the Outstanding Lead Actress category for The Bold and the Beautiful in 2017 and 2019. She won the Daytime Emmy Award for Outstanding Lead Actress in a Drama Series in 2020.

While working on The Bold and the Beautiful, she began shadowing directors and eventually directed the show herself. She has since directed episodes of The Young and the Restless, Good Trouble and Dynasty. She has also directed the video short Bigfoot's Love Slave and the short films Blink and Serenity.

== Personal life ==
Tom met musician James Achor when she saw his band perform, but he had a girlfriend at the time. They reconnected five years later, when both were single, and started a relationship. After fifteen years together, they announced their engagement in August 2011. They were married on September 17, 2011. Their son, Zane Alexander Achor, was born on October 28, 2012 in Los Angeles. Tom chose to have a drug-free birth. Zane appeared occasionally on The Bold and the Beautiful as her on-screen son, Will Spencer, until he was old enough to attend kindergarten.

Tom announced in February 2024 that her mother had died. She and her siblings were at their mother's bedside during her last moments.

She is a regular competitor in the Nautica Malibu Triathlon, raising money for Children's Hospital Los Angeles. She has also competed in the Miami Triathlon in Miami, Florida.

Tom is a supporter of LGBT equality and abortion rights. She is on the board of advocates for Planned Parenthood and she founded Daytime for Planned Parenthood. She has worked with the non-partisan Get out the vote organization She Votes.

== Filmography ==
=== Film ===
Year	Title	Role	Notes
2004	Delusion	Veronica Farrow	Short film
2005	Beyond the Ladies Room Door	Jody	Short film
2006	When We're Old and Love Means Nothing	Sarah	Short film
2006	Undone		
2007	City Teacher	Marsha	
2008	This is Not a Test	Herself	
2010	Stiffs	Lauren	
2010	Suicide Dolls	Lexi	
2010	The Putt Putt Syndrome	Vicki	
2011	Mamitas	Casandra	
2015	The Adventures of Sam Wolf	Dianne	Short film
2016	Little Dead Rotting Hood	Officer Victoria	Straight-to-DVD
2019	Animal Among Us	Marilyn Bishop	
2020	The Billionaire	The Woman	

=== Television ===
Year	Title	Role	Notes
1989	Who's the Boss?	Heather	Episode: "Heather Can Wait"
1989	Kids Incorporated	Not Listed	Episode: "Elementary, My Dear Kids"
1990	She'll Take Romance	Caroline	Television film
1990–2003	The Young and the Restless	Victoria Newman	Contract role
1995	Deadly Whispers	Kathy Acton	Television film
1995	Diagnosis: Murder	Herself	Episode: "Death in the Daytime"
2003–2006	One Life to Live	Kelly Cramer	Contract role
2004–2005	All My Children	Kelly Cramer	Recurring role
2004	Law & Order: Special Victims Unit	Dr. Solwey's Assistant	Episode: "Painless"
2006	The Rival	Jennifer Adams	Television film
2007	Monk	Linda Riggs	Episode: "Mr. Monk is on the Air"
2007	The Wedding Bells	Laurie Hill	2 episodes
2007–present	The Bold and the Beautiful	Katie Logan	Contract role
2008	Ugly Betty	Holly Wright	2 episodes
2010	The Mentalist	Marva	Episode: "Red Moon"
2011	Rizzoli & Isles	Mrs. Tolliver	Episode: "Living Proof"
2011	Criminal Minds	Connie Barton	Episode: "From Childhood's Hour"
2012	Imaginary Friend	Grace	Television film
2013	Renovation Unscripted	Herself	Television miniseries
2016	Unforgettable	Lt. Shanna Coates	Episode: "Bad Company"
2016	Lucifer	Mel Graham	2 episodes
2017	Mommy, I Didn't Do It	Anna Garrett	Television film
2017	Hollywood Darlings	Herself	Episode: "The Bev Witch Project"

=== Director ===
Year	Title	Notes
2016–2024	The Bold and the Beautiful	34 episodes
2017	Bigfoot's Love Slave	Video short film
2017	Serenity	Short film Also executive producer
2018	Blink	Short film Also executive producer
2019	The Young and the Restless	Episode: "11731"
2020-2021	Good Trouble	2 episodes
2020-2022	Dynasty	6 episodes

== Awards and nominations ==
List of acting awards and nominations for Heather Tom
Year	Award	Category	Title	Result	Ref.
1993	Daytime Emmy Award	Outstanding Younger Actress in a Drama Series	The Young and the Restless	Won	
1993	Soap Opera Digest Award	Outstanding Younger Leading Actress in a Drama Series	The Young and the Restless	Nominated	
1993	Young Artist Award	Best Young Actress in a Daytime Series	The Young and the Restless	Nominated	
1994	Daytime Emmy Award	Outstanding Younger Actress in a Drama Series	The Young and the Restless	Nominated	
1994	Soap Opera Digest Award	Outstanding Younger Leading Actress in a Drama Series	The Young and the Restless	Nominated	
1994	Young Artist Award	Best Youth Actress in a Soap Opera	The Young and the Restless	Nominated	
1995	Daytime Emmy Award	Outstanding Younger Actress in a Drama Series	The Young and the Restless	Nominated	
1996	Daytime Emmy Award	Outstanding Younger Actress in a Drama Series	The Young and the Restless	Nominated	
1996	Young Artist Award	Best Performance by a Young Actress: TV Drama Series	The Young and the Restless	Nominated	
1997	Daytime Emmy Award	Outstanding Younger Actress in a Drama Series	The Young and the Restless	Nominated	
1997	Soap Opera Digest Award	Outstanding Younger Leading Actress	The Young and the Restless	Won	
1998	Daytime Emmy Award	Outstanding Younger Actress in a Drama Series	The Young and the Restless	Nominated	
1999	Daytime Emmy Award	Outstanding Younger Actress in a Drama Series	The Young and the Restless	Won	
2000	Daytime Emmy Award	Outstanding Younger Actress in a Drama Series	The Young and the Restless	Nominated	
2004	Daytime Emmy Award	Outstanding Supporting Actress in a Drama Series	The Young and the Restless	Nominated	
2005	Daytime Emmy Award	Outstanding Supporting Actress in a Drama Series	One Life to Live	Nominated	
2005	Soap Opera Digest Award	Outstanding Supporting Actress	One Life to Live	Nominated	
2007	Daytime Emmy Award	Outstanding Supporting Actress in a Drama Series	One Life to Live	Nominated	
2008	Daytime Emmy Award	Outstanding Supporting Actress in a Drama Series	The Bold and the Beautiful	Nominated	
2011	Daytime Emmy Award	Outstanding Supporting Actress in a Drama Series	The Bold and the Beautiful	Won	
2012	Daytime Emmy Award	Outstanding Lead Actress in a Drama Series	The Bold and the Beautiful	Won	
2013	Daytime Emmy Award	Outstanding Lead Actress in a Drama Series	The Bold and the Beautiful	Won	
2014	Daytime Emmy Award	Outstanding Lead Actress in a Drama Series	The Bold and the Beautiful	Nominated	
2017	Daytime Emmy Award	Outstanding Lead Actress in a Drama Series	The Bold and the Beautiful	Nominated	
2019	Daytime Emmy Award	Outstanding Lead Actress in a Drama Series	The Bold and the Beautiful	Nominated	
2020	Daytime Emmy Award	Outstanding Lead Actress in a Drama Series	The Bold and the Beautiful	Won	
2026	Daytime Emmy Award	Outstanding Lead Actress in a Drama Series	The Bold and the Beautiful	Nominated	

Preceded by Ashley Nicole Millan	Victoria Newman (role); 1990–2003	Succeeded by Amelia Heinle
Preceded by Tracy Melchior	Kelly Cramer (role); 2003–06	Succeeded by Gina Tognoni
Preceded by Nancy Sloan	Katie Logan (role); 2007–present	Incumbent
