= Banco Azteca =

Mexican banking chain

Banco Azteca S.A. Institución de Banca Multiple
- Type: Private
- Traded as: ELEKTRA, MX
- Industry: Financial services
- Founded: 26 October 2002; 24 years ago
- Founder: Ricardo Salinas Pliego
- Headquarters: Mexico City, Mexico
- Key people: Tonatiuh Rodríguez Gómez (CEO), Alejandro Valenzuela del Río (Chairman of the Board)
- Products: Banking, Financial
- Number of employees: 42,747 (2023)
- Parent: Grupo Elektra (subsidiary of Grupo Salinas)
- Divisions: Banco Azteca Insurance
- Website: www.bancoazteca.com

Banco Azteca is a financial institution headquartered in Mexico and is part of Grupo Elektra, which is part of Grupo Salinas, a Mexican conglomerate with interests in banking, media, retail and telecommunications. Founded in October 2002 by businessman Ricardo Salinas Pliego, Banco Azteca's focus has been to promote financial inclusion by serving the segments of the population most neglected by traditional banking, providing financial services to middle and lower income groups.

Grupo Elektra has more than four thousand points of contact in Mexico, the United States and Central America. Banco Azteca has 22.854 million clients until 2025, according to CNBV.

== History ==
=== Early years and the 2000s ===
In 2002, Mexican businessman Ricardo Salinas Pliego decided to create a banking institution focused on the country's underbanked segment. A year earlier, he had applied to the Ministry of Finance and Public Credit for an operating license, which was finally granted in March 2002. Banco Azteca officially began operations on 30 October of that year.

The institution was created using the geographical presence of the group, thanks to the Elektra stores, a retail chain of Grupo Elektra. By 2003, Banco Azteca had more than 800 branches in these stores, eight independent contact points and 96 modules in various third-party channels. In the same year, the bank signed an agreement with the National Workers' Housing Fund Institute (INFONAVIT) to provide mortgage services.

In 2004, Banco Azteca entered the insurance sector with the creation of Seguros Azteca. In the same year, it began offering bank loans to small farmers and launched the Empresario Azteca initiative to finance small and medium-sized enterprises. In 2005, it became the first Mexican bank to operate internationally, opening branches in Panama and launching the Azteca Card.

After sponsoring the Mexico national football team in 2007, it ventured into the markets of Guatemala, Honduras and Argentina, and opened branches in Brazil and Peru the following year. In 2009, it began operations in El Salvador.

=== The 2010s ===
The institution began the decade by launching the prepaid card Monedero Azteca aimed at popular markets. In 2014 it developed its mobile application to enter the digital market and a year later it implemented the "Learn and Grow" educational program in Guatemala.

In 2015 banking executive Alejandro Valenzuela del Río took over as the institution's director. The bank celebrated its fifteenth anniversary in 2017 at an event at Campo Marte in Mexico City. In 2018 the institution ranked thirteenth on the BrandZTop 30 list of Mexico's most valuable brands compiled by the global data company Kantar Millward Brown with a value of 1.167 billion dollars. In 2019 the bank participated in financial inclusion forums such as the Women's Economic Forum and the Women's Forum Americas in Mexico City. The same year it inaugurated the "Space Academy of Savernauts" a financial culture exhibition aimed at children and young people. It was exhibited for two years at the Interactive Museum of Economics.

=== The 2020s and the present ===
In 2020, the institution launched a new financial product called Mobile Azteca Business Banking and reached the milestone of 10 million registered users of its mobile application. According to a report presented by Grupo Salinas, around 70% of the bank's transactions were carried out through mobile digital channels that year.

The launch of ApiLAB, a new digital platform aimed at offering Banco Azteca's products and services through third parties, was announced by Juan Carlos Arroyo, general director of Grupo Elektra Digital, at the "APIs in the Transformation of Mexico" forum held in November 2020. Arroyo also stated that the platform will be launched in 2021. The bank allocated 11 billion pesos to optimize its digitalization system.

In 2023, Banco Azteca reinforced its commitment to sport by sponsoring the Mexican Olympic team. The bank supported Mexican athletes participating in the Paris 2024 Olympic Games and on their way to Los Angeles 2028.

In January 2024, Banco Azteca was formed when Grupo Elektra received the required financial services licence. The bank began operating on January 7, 2024. In February 2024, Francisco Tonatiuh Rodríguez Gómez was appointed CEO and Alejandro Valenzuela became Chairman of the Board.

== Business model ==
Banco Azteca's business focus has been to serve the most underserved segments of the population, providing financial services to middle and lower income groups. According to Alejandro Valenzuela, CEO of Banco Azteca, the bank was "born as a popular institution" and "uses financial inclusion not as a rhetorical issue, but as a business model". The executive also stated that the bank's vocation is to create opportunities for its clients to join the financial system, "reaching the lagging areas of the country".

The study, "From Pawn Shops to Banks: The Impact of Formal Credit on Informal Households" by the University of California, in Los Angeles, mentions Banco Azteca as the first bank in Mexico to target informal sector households and states that these households have experienced several changes in their savings, credit and consumption patterns. The study "The Economic Impact of Banking the Unbanked: Evidence from Mexico', published by the World Bank, mentions that the institution has contributed to improving access to credit and formal financial services with for low-income populations by focusing on previously underserved areas.

Banco Azteca is the leading issuer of personal loans in Mexico. AFORE Azteca is the largest retirement fund administrator by account volume. As of mid-2025, Banco Azteca operates 2,029 branches and 2,675 ATMs in 813 municipalities and is the only private bank present in 178 of them and is the leading issuer of personal loans in Mexico (AFORE Azteca is the largest retirement fund administrator by account volume).

== Alliances ==
=== 2021 ===
- Banco Azteca signed a collaboration agreement with the United Nations Population Fund (UNFPA) in Mexico, aiming to promote human rights, gender equality, and financial education, particularly for women, girls, and adolescents.

=== 2024 ===
- Banco Azteca signed a collaboration agreement with the United Nations' International Organization for Migration in Mexico (IOM), aimed at promoting the financial inclusion of migrants.

== Awards and recognition ==
- 2017-2024: Centro Mexicano para la Filantropía and Alianza por la Responsabilidad Social Empresarial - ESR Award for the integration of corporate social responsibility policies.
- 2020: Effie Awards Mexico - Bronze Effie Award for the "Payday Friday" advertising campaign.
- 2023: Innovators in Finance Awards in the Americas - Platinum Award in Blockchain for the Retail Currency Transaction Traceability Project and Best Disruptive Project in the Americas 2023.

== Rankings ==
=== Kantar Millward Brown BrandZ Top 30 (2018) ===
- Thirteenth in the Top 30 of the most valuable brands in Mexico.

=== The Banker's Top 1000 World Banks (2023) ===
- Banco Azteca climbed 121 positions from the previous year to rank 622 in the world. It ranked sixth in the Highest Movers category in the region and was recognized as the fifth best performing bank in Mexico in the national ranking.

=== Fitch Ratings (2023) ===
- Fifth in the category of consumer loans in Mexico, with a market share of 8.6%, and eighth in deposits, with a market share of 3.1%.

=== The Banker's Top 1000 World Banks (2024) ===
- Banco Azteca climbed 65 places from the previous year to rank 557 globally. It ranked fifth in the Best Performing Bank in Mexico category and ninth in the country list. Finally, it was ranked 21st in the top 25 banks in Latin America and the Caribbean.

=== MERCO (2024) ===
- Banco Azteca ranked 67th in the list of the 100 companies with the best corporate reputation in Mexico, in the Corporate Reputation Business Monitor (in Spanish: MERCO-Monitor Empresarial de Reputación Corporativa).

=== CFI.co-Capital Finance International (2024) ===
- Banco Azteca was recognized as the Best Financial Inclusion Bank in Mexico for 2024.

=== FXC Intelligence (2024) ===
- Banco Azteca, as the financial arm of Grupo Elektra, was recognized for its global leadership in remittances with its inclusion in FXC Intelligence's Top 100.
