= Suicide Dolls =

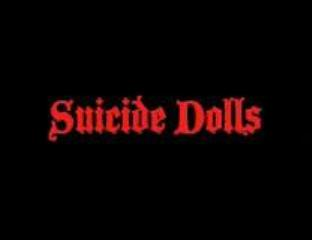
- Directed by: Keith Shaw
- Written by: Charissa Gracyk; Gillian Perdeau
- Produced by: Keith Shaw; LaQuita Cleare; Tom Costa; Tom Barton; Joanna Stancil; Todd Slater
- Starring: Christy Carlson Romano; Heather Tom; Steven Bauer; Joanna Stancil; Anne-Marie Johnson; LaQuita Cleare; Ryan Carnes; Whitmer Thomas; Ayo Sorrells; Gillian Perdeau; Jonah Wharton; Akeem Smith
- Cinematography: Keith L. Smith
- Edited by: Shawn P. Mitchell
- Music by: Norman Brown
- Production companies: Prop Blast Films; Salsera Productions; On the River Productions
- Release date: June 17, 2010 (San Francisco Black Film Festival)
- Country: United States
- Language: English

Suicide Dolls is a 2010 American film directed by Keith Shaw and starring LaQuita Cleare, Christy Carlson Romano, Heather Tom and Steven Bauer.

== Plot ==
Desperate for someone to notice them, high school seniors Amber and Jade have always wanted to do something really killer with their lives. One week before graduation, they decide to make a suicide pact and record the last 24 hours of their lives. As they live out their last day, the girls face past demons and reveal secrets that led them down the path of self-destruction. From drugs to abuse to death, they've lived in a warped world that has propelled them into a downward spiral.

== Cast ==
- LaQuita Cleare as Jade
- Christy Carlson Romano as Amber
- Heather Tom as Lexi
- Steven Bauer as Hank
- Ryan Carnes as Tyler
- Joanna Stancil as Sheila, Amber's Mother
