= Secretariat for Coordinating the Peace Process =

Sri Lankan government agency

The Secretariat for Coordinating the Peace Process (SCOPP) was established on 6 February 2002 by the Government of Sri Lanka (GOSL) to facilitate the peace process during a break in hostilities in the Sri Lankan Civil War. Heading the Secretariat were Bernard Goonetilleke (2002–2004), Dr. Jayantha Dhanapala (2004–2005), Dr. Palitha Kohona (2006–2007) and Prof. Rajiva Wijesinha (2007–2009). On 19 May 2009, Mahinda Rajapakse, then President of Sri Lanka, declared the end of the insurgency and the defeat of the Liberation Tigers of Tamil Eelam (LTTE), and the SCOPP was shut down on 31 July 2009.

SCOPP employees were drawn from both the private and public sectors in Sri Lanka and included specialists in communications, diplomacy, economics, and law.

In its first two years, SCOPP was under the authority of the Prime Minister of Sri Lanka. After that it came under the authority of the President of Sri Lanka.

During its existence, the SCOPP's mission was to coordinate, facilitate, and strengthen the peace process. SCOPP officials engaged in extensive talks with all the parties involved, which included representatives of the public and private sectors of the economy, civil society, charitable organizations, and line agencies.

== The SCOPP Mandate ==
The SCOPP was created with the following goals: to help implement government decisions, monitor the ceasefire agreement between the government and the LTTE, provide research and logical support to the government during political negotiations and to the National Advisory Council on Peace and Reconciliation, coordinate with local and international organizations on matters pertaining to the peace process, monitor the free movement of people and goods to and from uncleared areas, and communicate information about the peace process to media organizations and the public.

== Policy Division ==
The SCOPP was directly involved in updating policy issues pertaining to SCOPP and the overall peace process, including consulting with the political leadership about negotiation strategies. It kept records of government policies, media, and terrorism incidents; served as the link between the general public and civil society, political initiatives, and the government through awareness and educational programs on peace building and reconciliation; served as coordinator for government agencies, the security sector, ministries, the diplomatic sphere, and the civil society in relation to policy issues; shared information, such as that gained while monitoring peace and human rights organizations and analysing LTTE strategy in relation to the peace process, with the political leadership and other divisions of SCOPP; and compiled into reports expert knowledge gained through terrorism research initiatives conducted by government agencies.

== SCOPP Units ==
The SCOPP was divided into several divisions to handle the various tasks. These divisions were: Ceasefire Agreement (CFA) Affairs, Communications, Economics, Legal, and Operations and Logistics.

=== Ceasefire Agreement Affairs ===
The office of Ceasefire Agreement Affairs (CFAA) handled tasks that pertained to the Ceasefire Agreement (CFA). These included: monitoring the CFA and dealing with issues pertaining to it; examining LTTE violations of the CFA and preparing recommendations to the SLMM; preparing government responses to allegations of government violations of the CFA; preparing reports based on the SLMM monthly statistics on ceasefire violations; and coordinating with relevant ministries, civil society groups, and government local monitors to the SLMM on ceasefire-related issues.

=== Communications ===
The tasks of the Communications Department were: to monitor and coordinate with local and foreign media organizations in dispersing information about the peace process; guide and assist non-governmental organisations (NGOs) and international non-governmental organisations (INGOs) in communications-related programs; and support other SCOPP divisions in communications-related matters.

=== Economics ===
The tasks of the Economics Department were to promote private sector trade and investment in the northern and eastern parts of Sri Lanka; provide logistical and technical support to the North East Donor Coordination Cluster of the National Council for Economic Development (NCED); identify and resolve policy and implementation issues affecting donor-funded projects in the north and east; coordinate with government agencies, donors, and NGOs on peace-related development and reconciliation issues, especially in the north and east; and research the economic dimensions of governance and peace-related issues.

=== Legal ===
The tasks of the Legal Department were: to handle legal aspects relating to the political, economic, and social dimensions of the peace process; address issues of domestic and international law, including human rights and constitutional law; prepare and review position papers, aides-memoires, and other documents; correspond and meet with concerned parties, including civil society organizations, to obtain input on aspects of the peace process; and coordinate with government entities, foreign embassies, and NGOs on legal matters related to the peace process.

=== Operations and Logistics ===
The tasks of the Operations and Logistics Department were: to coordinate with security forces and police on peace and security-related issues; monitor the current security situation on the ground; analyze national security-related incidents; and facilitate the land, air, and sea movements of the ceasefire monitors, facilitators, and the LTTE to and from uncleared areas.
