= Grupo Elektra =

Mexican financial and retailing corporation

Grupo Elektra S.A.B. de C.V.

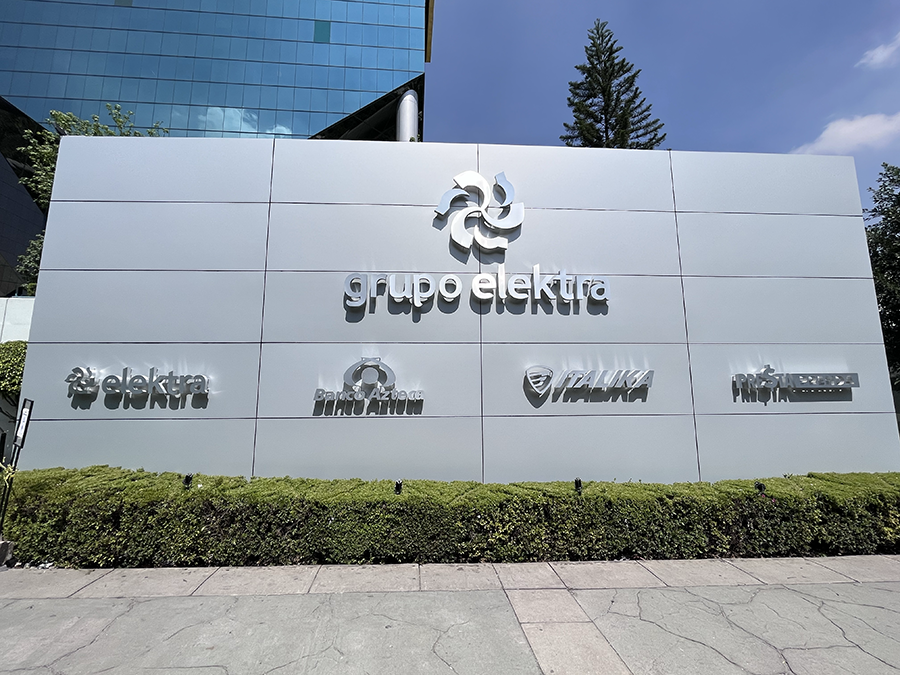
- Headquarters in Mexico City
- Formerly: Grupo Elektra S.A. De C.V. (1993–2006)
- Type: Sociedad Anónima de Capital Variable
- Traded as: BMV: ELEKTRA; BMAD: XEKT
- ISIN: MX01EL000003
- Industry: Retail; Financial services
- Founded: 1993; 33 years ago
- Founder: Hugo Salinas Price
- Headquarters: Mexico City, Mexico
- Area served: Mexico, United States, Latin America
- Key people: Ricardo B. Salinas, (Chairman); Fabrice Deceliere Márquez, (CEO Elektra Stores); Tonatiuh Rodríguez Gómez, (CEO Banco Azteca); Alejandro Valenzuela del Río, (Chairman Banco Azteca); Álvaro A. Calderón Jiménez, (CFO)
- Products: Home appliance, Mobile phones, Computers, Consumer electronics, Furniture, Extended Warranties, E-commerce, Money transfers, Deposits, Personal and business loans, Credit cards, Life insurance, Liability insurance, Pension funds.
- Revenue: $ 51.768 million (2015)
- Operating income: $ 6.939 billion (2015)
- Net income: $ 1.865 billion (2015)
- Number of employees: 74,643 (2025)
- Parent: Grupo Salinas
- Subsidiaries: Elektra; Banco Azteca; Afore Azteca; Seguros Azteca; Italika; Purpose Financial; Punto Casa de Bolsa; Presta Prenda.
- Website: https://www.grupoelektra.com.mx

Grupo Elektra is a Mexican financial and retail corporation conglomerate founded in 1950 by Hugo Salinas Price and owned by Ricardo Salinas Pliego. The company currently operates over seven thousand points of contact across Mexico, United States, and Central America, through two business divisions: commercial and financial. Its parent company, Grupo Salinas, is a corporate group with interests across various economic sectors.

Grupo Elektra's commercial division includes Elektra, Italika, and Salinas y Rocha, while its financial division comprises Banco Azteca, Seguros Azteca, Punto Casa de Bolsa, Purpose Financial, and Afore Azteca. Also, Elektra is listed on the Bolsa Mexicana de Valores and on the Spanish Stock Market Latibex (XEKT).

As of March 2025, Grupo Elektra reported a customer base of 23 million clients, over 7,700 service points, and presence in more than 730 municipalities in Mexico, as well as operations in Guatemala, Honduras and Panama. Its financial services division includes Banco Azteca, Seguros Azteca, and Afore Azteca, while the commercial division comprises Elektra (stores), Salinas y Rocha, and Italika motorcycles.

== History ==
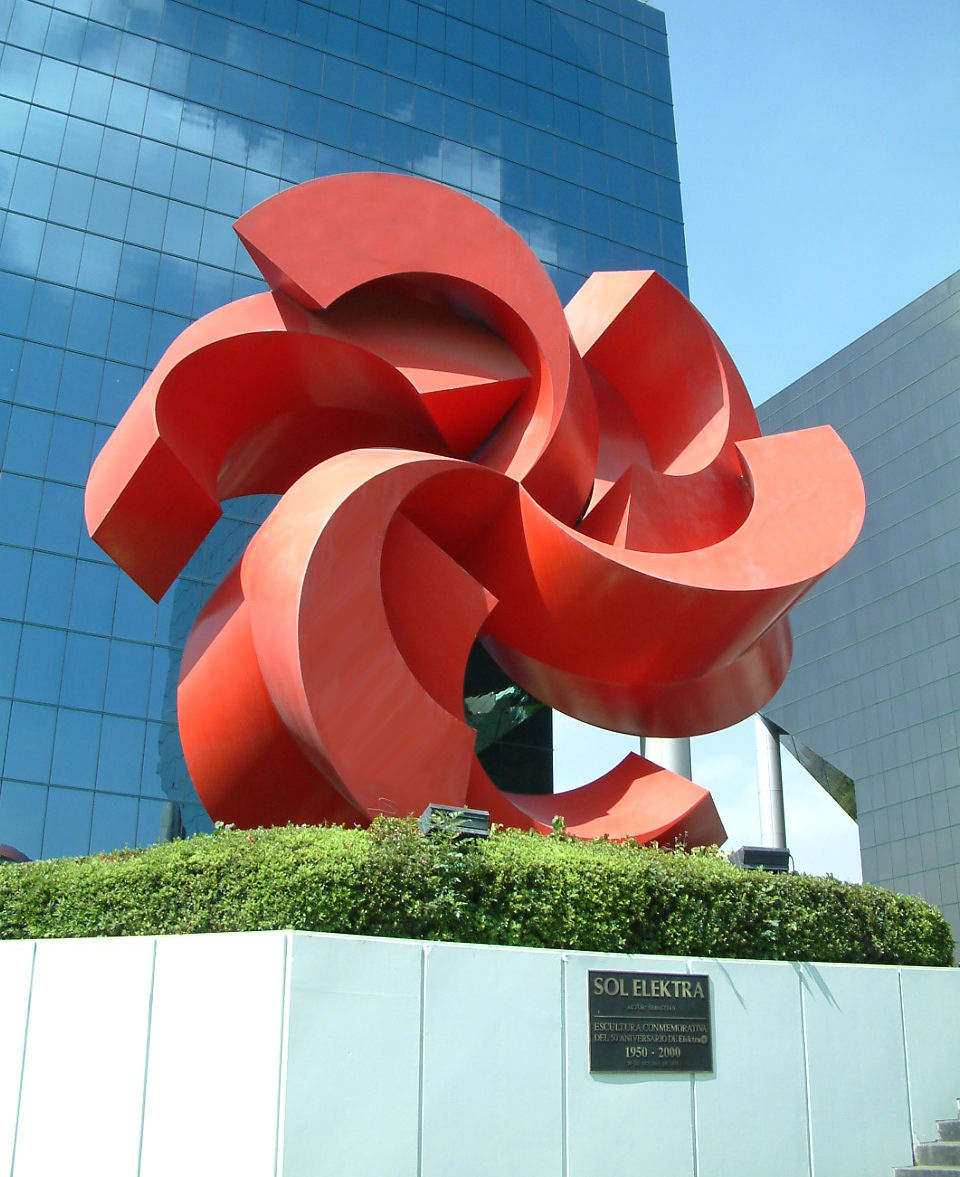
Sol Elektra by Sebastián

The origins of Grupo Elektra date back to 1950, when entrepreneur Hugo Salinas Price launched a small appliance store in Monterrey, Nuevo León. Although the company initially specialized in radio equipment, over time it added other products to its catalog, such as furniture, televisions, and home accessories, enabling it to establish new locations across the country.

Initially, Elektra served only wholesalers; however, as this model declined, Salinas Price shifted the company's focus to retail and credit sales. In the mid-1980s, he passed the management of the company to his son, Ricardo Salinas Pliego, who assumed the role of president in 1987. After achieving international expansion, the company made its debut on the Mexican Stock Exchange (Bolsa Mexicana de Valores, in Spanish) in 1993.

That same year, the company acquired the state-owned Mexican broadcaster known as Imevisión, which later became TV Azteca. Six years later, the company acquired a 94.3% share in the Salinas y Rocha store chain, and in 2002, founded Banco Azteca, a financial institution aimed at serving segments of the population underserved by traditional banks.

In 2004, the company launched Seguros Azteca and entered the motorcycle market with the introduction of the Italika brand. In early 2012, the group announced that it had reached an agreement to acquire the non-bank lender Advance America (now known as Purpose Financial) to expand its operations in the United States. Also in 2012, Punto Casa de Bolsa, an investment institution focused on small and medium-sized enterprises, began operations.

On 27 December 2024, shareholders approved the delisting of Grupo Elektra from the Mexican Stock Exchange (BMV), transitioning into a private company. This decision was approved by over 95% of its shareholders during an extraordinary meeting held on the same day. The company stated that this move was part of a strategy to strengthen its financial, digital, and international capabilities while maximizing its real value.

As part of the delisting process, Grupo Elektra appointed a new Board of Directors, with Pedro Padilla Longoria as Chairman and Gabriel Alfonso Roqueñí Rello as CEO.

== Commercial Division ==
=== Elektra Stores ===
Elektra is the Grupo Azteca’s most significant retail format, with over 1,200 points of contact across Mexico, Honduras, and Guatemala. It offers a range of products, including household appliances, consumer electronics, computer systems, mobile phones and furniture. These products primarily target the C and D+ population segments, representing middle- and lower-income groups. According to company data, Elektra sells, on average, 1 in every 4 televisions, 1 in every 5 refrigerators, and 7 out of every 10 motorcycles in Mexico.

=== Italika ===
Italika is Grupo Elektra’s motorcycle brand, focused on urban and work-related mobility. This motorcycle brand was launched in November 2004 in partnership with South Korean manufacturer Hyosung. In 2008, Italika opened an assembly plant in Toluca, State of Mexico, and by 2011, had already sold one million units in the country. By 2014, the brand had successfully sold two million motorcycles. According to Forbes magazine, Italika "is marketed in 1,000 Elektra stores and 2,500 third-party points of sale".

Italika maintained leadership in the Mexican motorcycle market, with over 50% market share, consolidating its position as the country’s top-selling motorcycle brand.

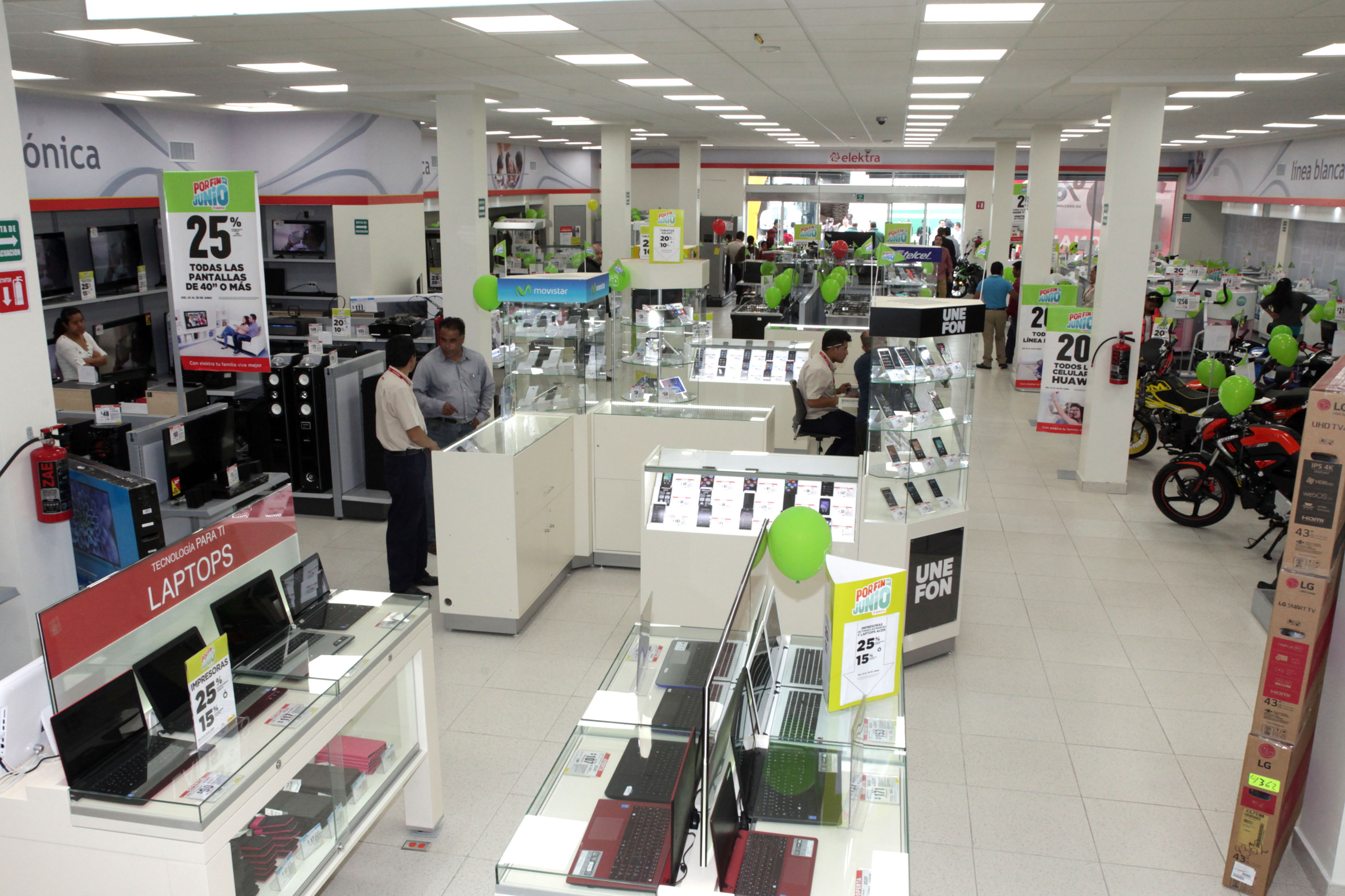
Elektra store in Villa Victoria, Edo Mex.

=== Salinas y Rocha ===
Salinas y Rocha is a retail chain founded in 1906 by Benjamín Salas Westrup and acquired by the Group in 1999 through an auction. Unlike Elektra stores, Salinas y Rocha’s products target the C+ and C socioeconomic segments.

== Financial Division ==
=== Banco Azteca ===
Banco Azteca is a banking institution that began operations in 2002, primarily serving middle and lower-income populations. According to official sources, the bank operated nearly two thousand branches by 2022, located throughout Mexico and Central America. Seguros Azteca, a Banco Azteca subsidiary, provides life and risk insurance for the same target audience. Additionally, Afore Azteca offers retirement fund management services, supported by the Group's extensive geographic reach.

Banco Azteca operates in Mexico, Guatemala, Honduras, El Salvador, Panama and Peru, and is the largest bank in Mexico in geographical coverage with more than 3,500 points of contact. Banco Azteca Mexico has more than 13 million of deposit accounts and a similar numbers of loan accounts. Banco Azteca offers consumer and personal loans, credit cards, pawn lending, and group and commercial loans.

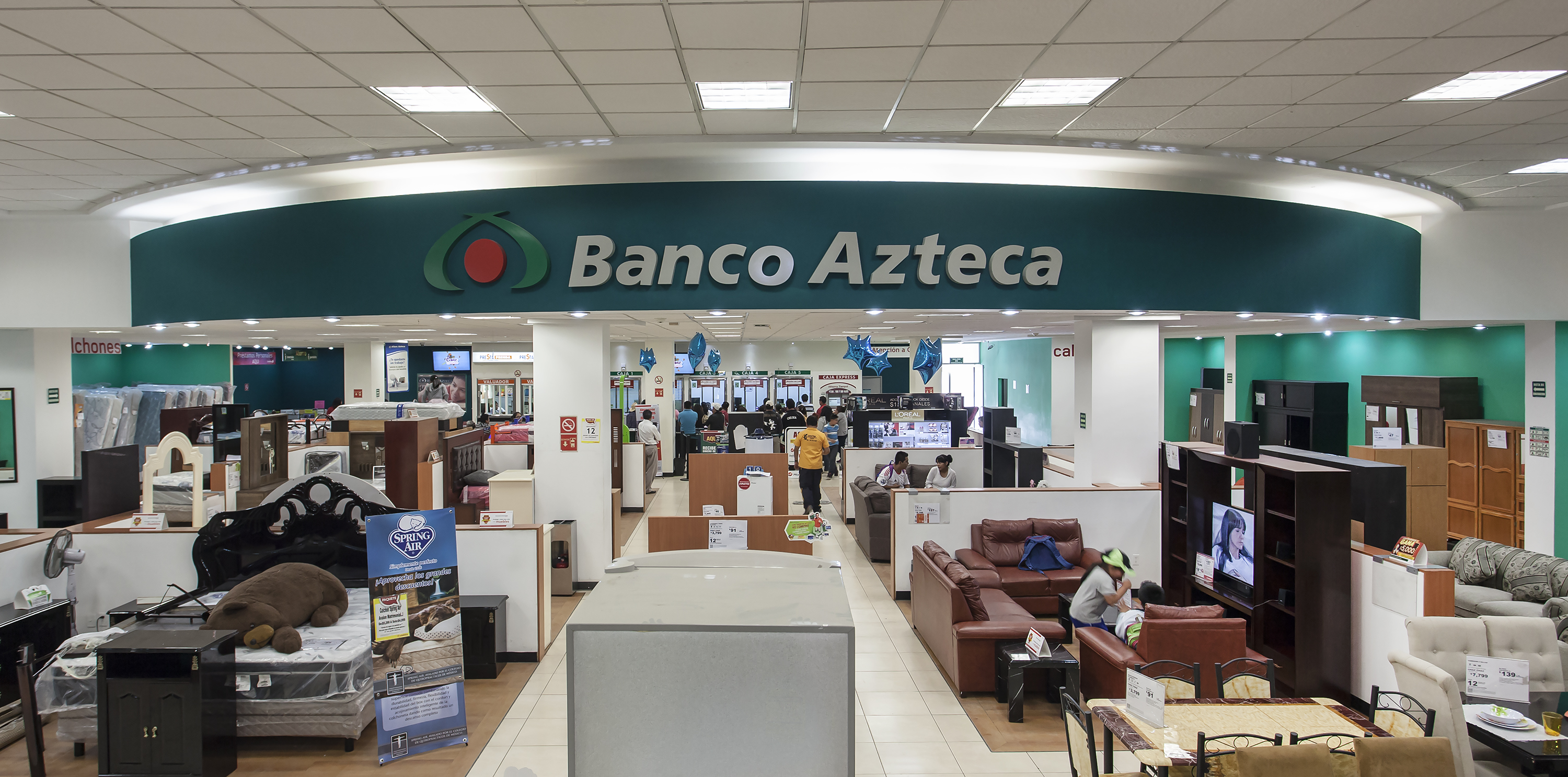
Entry into the Banco Azteca

On the deposit side, the bank offers a variety of savings products for its target market, with interest-bearing accounts that can be opened with one peso and do not generate commissions.

According to the World Bank, Banco Azteca has a positive impact on the development of numerous communities through micro financing. In the Global Financial Development Report of 2014, about Financial Inclusion, the World Bank indicated that after two years from the start of operations of Banco Azteca in 2002, personal income increased 7% in areas where branches were established, and unemployment decreased 1.4%, due to the increased access to credit, with lower interest rates, compared to other local and microfinance loan providers.

As of 2025, over 60% of Banco Azteca loans were originated through its mobile app, making it the bank’s primary credit origination channel.

=== Punto Casa de Bolsa ===
Punto Casa de Bolsa is a stock market subsidiary that focuses on serving small and medium-sized enterprises as well as individual investors. After obtaining authorization from the National Banking and Securities Commission of Mexico (CNBV by its Spanish acronym) in 2011, the company began operations in 2012, initially providing institutional promotion services. In 2013, it expanded into investment banking services, and by 2015, it had formed a strategic alliance with South Korean conglomerate Samsung to launch its mobile app, called Punto Trader. In January 2020, the company received authorization to operate as an investment fund distributor from the CNBV.

=== Purpose Financial ===
Founded in 1997 as Advance America, which was a payday loan provider in the United States, was acquired by Grupo Elektra in 2012 to expand its operations in the United States. The company offers credit options to consumers without banking intermediation and is a founding member of the Community Choice Financial Incorporated (CCFI).

=== Others ===
Seguros Azteca offers life and liability microinsurance that can be acquired at affordable prices in Mexico and Latin America. Afore Azteca offers pension fund management with the support of the extensive geographical coverage of Grupo Elektra.

== Sustainability and Corporate Values ==
As part of Grupo Salinas, Grupo Elektra joined the United Nations Global Compact in 2018, committing to its ten principles in the areas of human rights, labor, environment, and anti-corruption. According to company reported data, Elektra has invested 113 million Mexican pesos in environmental management, with 35% of the energy used in its operations coming from renewable sources. The company also adopted the recommendations of the Task Force on Climate-related Financial Disclosures for analyzing climate change risks and opportunities. In 2022, Banco Azteca, Elektra and Italika received the Socially Responsible Company (ESR, by its Spanish acronym) distinction, awarded by the Mexican Center for Philanthropy (CEMEFI, by its Spanish acronym).

== Rankings ==
=== FXC Intelligence (2024) ===
- Grupo Elektra was recognized as a global leader in remittances with its inclusion in FXC Intelligence's Top 100.

== Awards and Distinctions ==
Year	Award and/or Organizer	Category	Ref.
2018	eCommerce Awards Mexico	Leading eCommerce retailer in Mexico	
2022	ESR Distinctive	Part of the list of the leading companies in sustainability	
2023	Time Magazine and Statista	Part of the list of the World's Best Companies in 2023	
2024	AMCO	Grupo Elektra was recognized as the most awarded brand of 2024 by AMCO.	

== Finances ==
The figures presented in the table below are extracted from one of Grupo Elektra's quarterly reports for 2015.

	2014	2015	Growth
Consolidated Revenue	$73,629	$75,902	3%
EBITDA	$9,479	$10,734	13%
Consolidated Fund Gathering	$93,147	$100,573	8%
Consolidated Late Payments Rate	9%	6.1%	
