= She'll Take Romance =

1990 television film directed by Piers Haggard

- Genre: Comedy
- Written by: James S. Henerson; James G. Hirsch
- Directed by: Piers Haggard
- Starring: Linda Evans; Tom Skerritt
- Music by: Yanni
- Country of origin: United States
- Original language: English

Production
- Producer: Harry R. Sherman
- Production location: Seattle
- Cinematography: Paul Murphy
- Editor: Pamela Malouf-Cundy
- Running time: 100 minutes
- Production company: New World Television

Original release
- Network: ABC
- Release: November 25, 1990

She'll Take Romance (alternate title: I'll Take Romance) is a 1990 American made-for-television comedy film starring Linda Evans, Tom Skerritt and Larry Poindexter. It was broadcast on ABC on November 25, 1990.

== Synopsis ==
Linda Evans plays Jane McMillan, a Seattle TV meteorologist. Jane is assigned to host a contest to find the most romantic man in Puget Sound. Her boyfriend, played by Tom Skerritt, is a nice but boring judge, who spends most of the time on the sidelines. Heather Tom plays Caroline, Jane's romance novel-obsessed daughter, who urges her mother to find someone more "dynamic".

She'll Take Romance was filmed on location in Seattle, Washington.

== Cast ==
- Linda Evans – Jane McMillan
- Tom Skerritt – Judge Warren Danvers
- Larry Poindexter – Mike Heller
- DeLane Matthews – April August
- Heather Tom – Caroline McMillan
