= Rajiva Wijesinha =

Sri Lankan writer

Hon. Rajiva Wijesinha රජීව විජේසිංහ MP
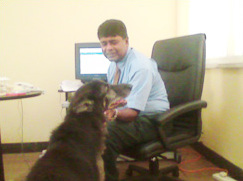
- Rajiva Wijesinha in 2007

Member of Parliament for National List
- In office 2010–2015

State Minister of Higher Education
- In office 12 January 2015 – 17 February 2015
- President: Maithripala Sirisena
- Prime Minister: Ranil Wickremesinghe

Personal details
- Born: 16 May 1954 (age 72) Sri Lanka
- Party: Liberal
- Education: University College, Oxford; Corpus Christi College, Oxford
- Occupation: Author
- Website: rajivawijesinha.wordpress.com

Rajiva Wijesinha, M.A., DPhil (Sinhala: රජීව විජේසිංහ; born 16 May 1954) is a Sri Lankan writer in English, distinguished for his political analysis as well as creative and critical work. An academic by profession for much of his working career, he was most recently Senior Professor of Languages at the University of Sabaragamuwa, Sri Lanka.

In June 2007, Sri Lanka President Mahinda Rajapaksa appointed Wijesinha as the Secretary General of the Sri Lankan Government Secretariat for Coordinating the Peace Process (SCOPP) and in June 2008 he also became concurrently the Secretary to the Ministry of Disaster Management and Human Rights (Sri Lanka). The Peace Secretariat wound up in July 2009, and in February 2010 he resigned from the Ministry as well as the University, and became a member of parliament on the National List of the United People's Freedom Alliance following the General Election held in April 2010, following which he was appointed a member of parliament.

Wijesinha belongs to the Liberal Party of Sri Lanka, and has served as its President and leader, and also as a Vice-President of Liberal International. He is currently Chair of the Council of Asian Liberals and Democrats and was re-elected leader of the Liberal Party Sri Lanka on the proposal of the previous leader following the Liberal Party Annual Congress of 2011. He has travelled widely, including as a visiting professor on the Semester at Sea programme of the University of Pittsburgh, and has published Beyond the First Circle: Travels in the Second and Third Worlds.

== Education and career ==
Rajiva Wijesinha was educated at S. Thomas' College, Mount Lavinia and University College, Oxford, before studying at Corpus Christi College, Oxford. He completed a BPhil in English Studies and a DPhil in English Literature at Oxford. His doctoral thesis, Marriage and the position of women, as presented by some of the early Victorian novelists, was completed in 1979 and is held in the University of Oxford Research Archive.

Wijesinha subsequently worked in higher education and at the British Council in Colombo. During his time at the British Council he was involved in programmes relating to literature, English-language education and the development of Sri Lankan writing in English. The British Council has described his contribution to its literary activities in Sri Lanka, including his role in promoting the work of local writers.

He later became a professor at Sabaragamuwa University of Sri Lanka, where he was associated with the university's language and literature programmes. A university publication records him as Professor of Languages and describes his academic and administrative work in English language and literature, including involvement with the Sri Lanka Military Academy's degree programme and the National Institute of Education. He is now Professor Emeritus of Sabaragamuwa University, where he is associated with English literature.

Wijesinha has also been involved in English-language education in Sri Lanka. His academic and professional work included programmes concerned with English teaching and teacher education, and he served as an academic coordinator for the Sri Lanka Military Academy's degree programme and as a consultant to the Ministry of Education.

In the literary field, Wijesinha has written fiction, literary criticism, political works and books on education. His short-story cycle Servants won the Gratiaen Prize in 1995. His literary work has also been the subject of academic criticism. Yasmine Gooneratne, for example, published a critical review of his novel Acts of Faith in the CRNLE Reviews Journal in 1986.

Wijesinha has served on the editorial board of the Journal of Commonwealth Literature and contributed to the journal. In 1998, he wrote a guest editorial for the journal to mark the fiftieth anniversary of Sri Lankan independence.

His publications include The Androgynous Trollope: Women in the Victorian Novel, Political Principles and their Practice in Sri Lanka, The Foundations of Modern Society, A Handbook of English Grammar and Declining Sri Lanka. Declining Sri Lanka was published by Foundation Books and is catalogued by Cambridge University Press.

In June 2007, Mahinda Rajapaksa, then President of Sri Lanka, appointed Wijesinha Secretary General of the Secretariat for Coordinating the Peace Process (SCOPP). In June 2008 he also became Secretary to the Ministry of Disaster Management and Human Rights. His work in this period included public engagement on Sri Lanka's ethnic conflict and reconciliation efforts.

The SCOPP was wound up in July 2009. Wijesinha subsequently entered parliament as a National List member following the 2010 Sri Lankan general election.

His later literary work has continued to receive coverage in the Sri Lankan press. Daily Mirror reviewed his novel The Limits of Love in 2025, discussing the work and its relationship to his earlier writing.

== Work ==
=== Fiction ===
- Acts of Faith, 1985
- Electra (A play in three Acts)
- Days of Despair, 1989
- The Lady Hippopotamus and Other Stories, 1991
- Servants: A Cycle, 1995
- An English Education, 1996
- The Limits of Love, 2005
- Servi, 2002 (Italian translation of Servants: A Cycle, 1995)
- Atti di fede, 2006 (Italian translation of Acts of Faith, 1985)
- The Terrorist Trilogy, 2008.
- Acts of Faith, 2016
- Servants(2nd Expanded Edition), 2020

=== Non-Fiction ===
- The Androgynous Trollope: Women in the Victorian Novel (1982)

==== Education ====
- English and Education: in search of equity and excellence?, 2016
- A City of Acquatint (Letters from Oxford to Colombo 1971-79), 2018
- George Cawkwell of Univ. Colombo, Sri Lanka: S. Godage & Brothers, 2019 (edited)

===== English Language =====
- Aspects of Teaching and Learning English as a Second Language, 1991 (edited with James Drury)
- A Guide to Studying and Thinking, 1998 (with Priyantha Kulatunge and Ralf Starkloff)
- A Handbook of English Grammar, 2004
- Building Career Skills, 2016 (with Shashikala Assella, B. M. C. N. Balasooriya, Noel Jayamanne, Darshana Sanjeewa, Ravi Pratap Singh, Neomal Weerakoon)
- Developing Career Skills, 2016 (with Thilanka Ariyathilaka, Shashikala Assella, B. M. C. N. Balasooriya, Noel Jayamanne, Darshana Sanjeewa, Ravi Pratap Singh, Neomal Weerakoon)

===== Literature =====
- Breaking Bounds: Essays on Sri Lankan Writing in English, 1998
- Inside Limits: Identity and Repression in Post- Colonial Fiction, 1998
- A Selection of Modern Sri Lankan Short Stories in English, edited (with Dinali Fernando), 2005
- A Selection of Modern Sri Lankan Poetry in English, 2006
- Bridging Connections (An Anthology of Sri Lankan Short Stories), 2007
- Poets and their Visions, 2015
- An Anthology of English Poetry and Prose, 2016

===== Travel and Social History =====
- Beyond the First Circle: Travels in the Second and Third Worlds, 1993
- Fact and Fable: Aspects of East West Interaction (proceedings of a conference held at Sabaragamuwa University in August 1999), 2000
- Richard de Zoysa: his life, some work ... a death, 2000
- Across Cultures: Issues of Identity in Contemporary British and Sri Lankan Writing, 2001 (edited with Neluka Silva)
- Gilding the Lily: Celebrating Ena de Silva, 2002
- All Experience: Essays and Reflections (edited essays of Sam Wijesinha), 2001.
- The Foundations of Modern Society, 2004
- Endgames and Excursions: Lakmahal, Sri Lanka and a wider world, 2017
- Lakmahal Justified: Taking English to The People, 2018
- Lakmahal in War for Peace, 2019

==== Politics ====
- Current Crisis in Sri Lanka, 1986
- Liberal Values for South Asia Liberal Values for South Asia (edited with Friedrich Naumann Stiftung), Colombo, 1997
- Conflict: Causes and Consequences (proceedings of a Seminar Series conducted by the CLD), (edited with Priyantha Kulatunge), 2001
- Political Principles and Their Practice in Sri Lanka Political Principles and their Practice in Sri Lanka, 2005
- Enemies of Pluralism: Assaults on Diversity, Democracy and the Rule of Law, by JR Jayewardene & Velupillai Prabhakaran, 2006
- Ideas for Constitutional Reform, 2007 (revised/abridged from the original publication as edited by Dr Chanaka Amaratunga, 1989)
- Declining Sri Lanka, 2007
- Pursuing Peace, Fighting Falsehood, 2008
- Reform, Rights and Good Governance, 2015
- Triumph and Disaster: the Rajapaksa Years. Part 1 – Success in War, 2015
- Triumph and Disaster: the Rajapaksa Years. Part 2 - Failure in Reconciliation, 2016
- The Mango Tree: Inclusivity and Integrity in International Relations, 2016

=== Articles in books & major journals ===
- Interview in Configurations of Exile: South Asian Writers and their World, edited by Chelva Kanaganayakam, TSAR, Toronto, 1995
- Teaching Post-Colonial Literature in Sri Lanka' in Dolphin 27 – Teaching Post-Colonialism and Post-Colonial Literatures, edited by Anne Collett, Lars Jensen & Anna Rutherford, Aarhus, 1997
- "Aberrations and Excesses: Sri Lanka substantiated by the Funny Boy", Miscelanea vol. 18, Universidad de Zaragoza, 1997
- "Cutting through Territories: Naipaul's 'A Way in the World'", Translating Cultures, KRK/Dangaroo, 1999
- "Sex and the Single Girl: Scott's recommendations for the Raj", Gladly wolde she teche and lerne: Essays in honour of Yasmine Gooneratne, London 1999
- Why are we afraid of Secularism in Pakistan?, Christian Study Centre, Rawalpindi, 1999
- "Travesties: Romance and Reality in the Raj Quartet", Journal of Comparative Literature and Aesthetics, Orissa, 2000
- "Spices and Sandcastles: the exotic historians of Sri Lanka", Across Cultures: Issues of Identity in Contemporary British and Sri Lankan Writing (proceedings of the Conference held at the British Council Sri Lanka in 2000; British Council, Colombo, 2001)
- "A deeper communion: the older women of The Raj Quartet", Missions of Interdependence, the publication of the proceedings of the 1999 Tübingen EACLALS Conference (Rhodopi, 2002)
- "Richard de Zoysa: his life, some work ... and a death", Towards a Transcultural Future: Literature and Human Rights in a ‘Post’-Colonial World, the publication of the proceedings of the 2000 ASNEL Conference held in Aachen (Rhodopi 2005)
- "Bringing back the bathwater: new initiatives in English policy in Sri Lanka", The Politics of English as a World Language, the publication of the proceedings of the 2001 ASNEL Conference held in Freiburg (Rhodopi, 2003)
- "Religion and Culture in the Liberal State", Liberal Values for South Asia, edited by Wijesinha, CLD, Colombo 1997
- "Education in Sri Lanka – the failure of good intentions and little learning", Protection of Minority Rights and Diversity, edited by Nanda Wanasundara, International Centre for Ethnic Studies, 2004
- "Agendas of Oppression", I want to speak of tenderness: 50 writers for Anne Ranasinghe, edited by Gerard Robuchon, ICES 2004
- "Travels in the United States", Excursions and Explorations: Cultural Encounters between Sri Lanka and the United States, edited by Tissa Jayatilaka, Colombo, 2002
- "A Refuge", Gilding the Lily: Celebrating Ena de Silva, edited by Wijesinha, Colombo, 2002
- "Entries on Bapsi Sidhwa and Sri Lankan Literature", Encyclopaedia of Postcolonial Studies, edited by John C Hawley, USA, 2001
- Entry on Sri Lankan Literature in English in the Encyclopaedia of South Asian Literature in English, edited by Jaina Sanga, USA, 2004

== See also ==
- List of Sri Lankan non-career Permanent Secretaries
