= USS Electra =

Two ships of the United States Navy have been named USS Electra, after the star Electra, which in turn is named after the Greek mythological figure, Electra:

- USS Electra (1843), a barque purchased by the navy in 1847
- USS Electra (AKA-4), an Arcturus-class attack cargo ship launched in 1941
