= Interactive Museum of Economics =

Mexican museum dedicated to economics and finance

Coordinates: 19°26′07.5″N 99°08′18.3″W

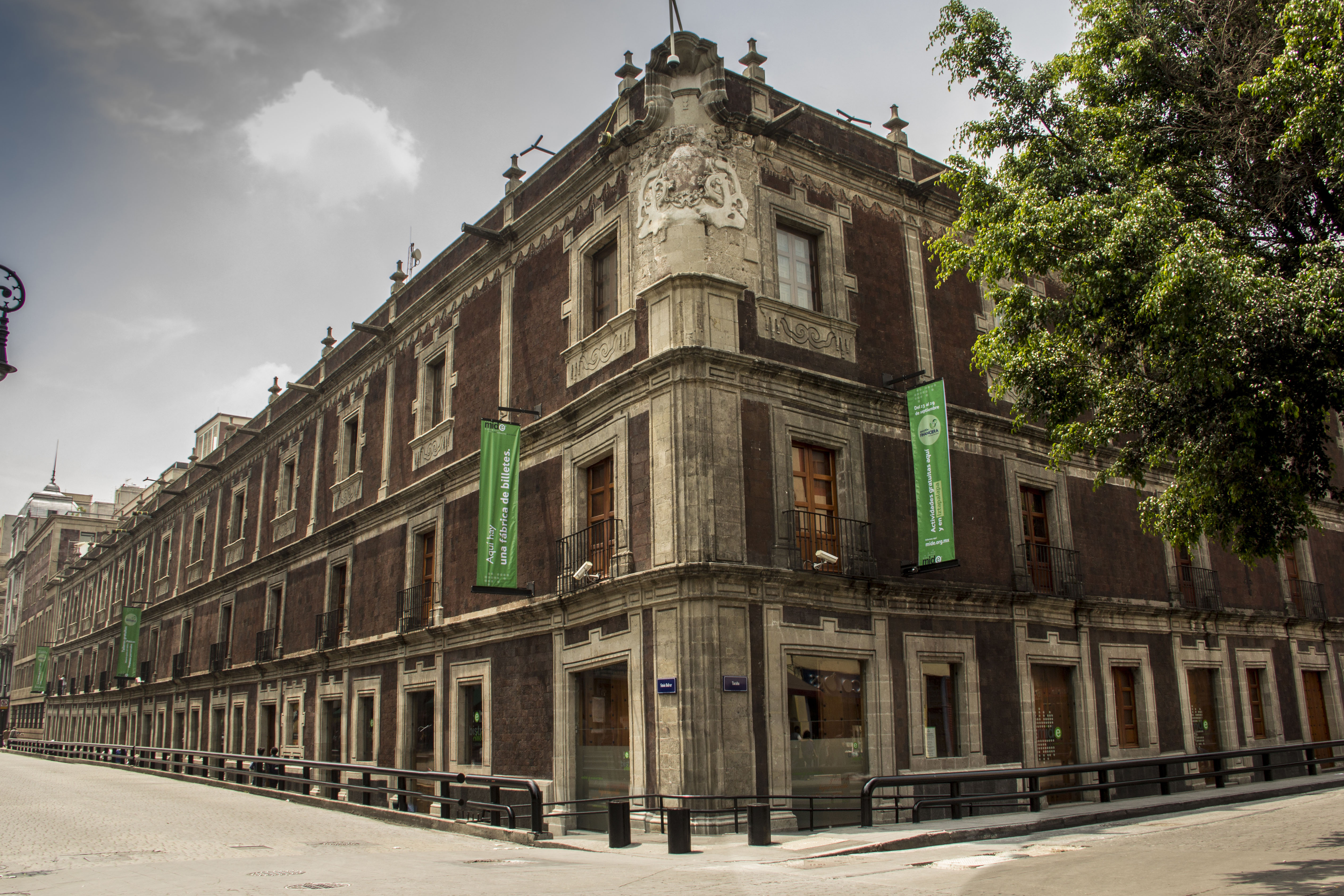
Facade of the former convent and current museum on Tacuba Street

Interactive Museum of Economics (Museo Interactivo de Economía) is the first museum in the world dedicated exclusively to economics. The museum was opened in 2006 and is located on Tacuba Street in the historic center of Mexico City. The museum is open to the public and features hands-on exhibits meant to make the basic concepts of economics fun and engaging. The museum is housed in the old Bethlehemite convent and hospital. Before the Bank of Mexico acquired the building in 1990, it was in ruins and filled with debris. It took fifteen years to restore the building to what it probably looked like in the 19th century.

== The building ==
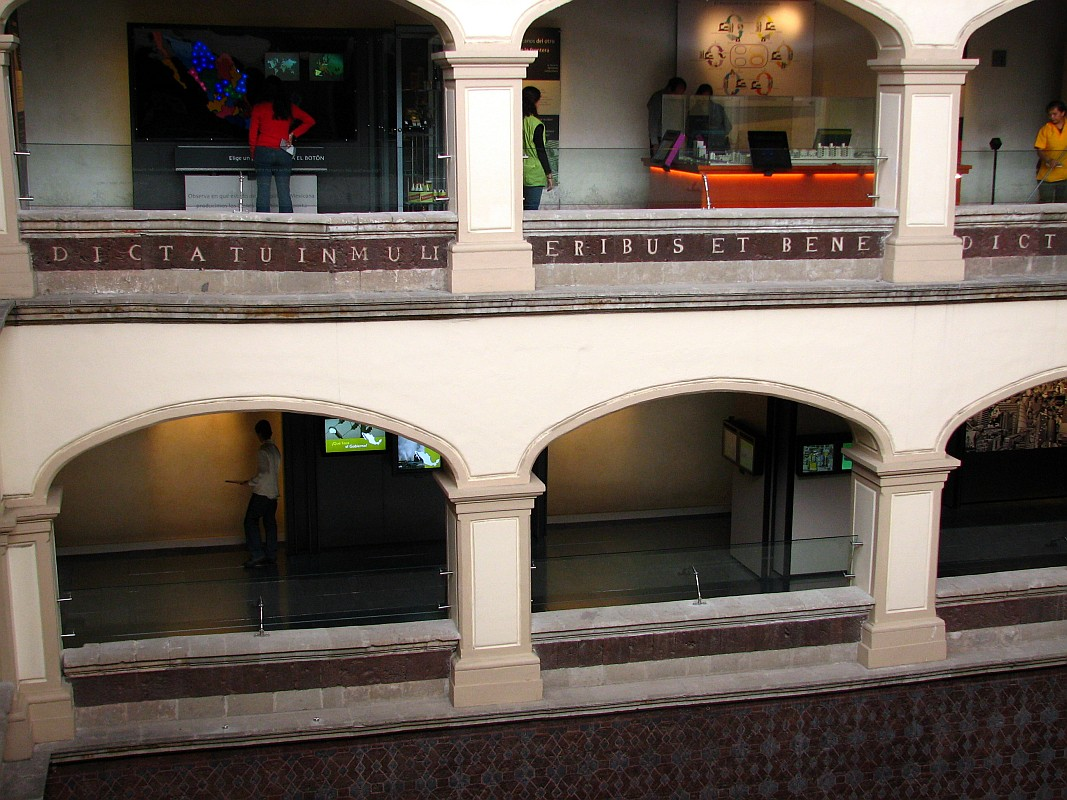
Inside the courtyard area

It is located in the restored building that belonged to the old Convent of the Bethlehemites on Tacuba Street. The building was constructed as a hospital in the 18th century by the Bethlehemites, which was the only religious order founded in the Americas. This religious order was later disbanded by the Spanish Crown for supporting insurgents during the Mexican War of Independence. The building covers half of a city block on Tacuba Street between Bolivar and Filomeno Mata. Before it was completely abandoned, the building was used as a tenement with frozen rents and a cheap hotel. The owners decided to cover the inside courtyard in order to construct more rooms. The Bank of Mexico acquired the building in 1990. The building was restored completely to the way is most likely looked two centuries ago.

Before restoration, the building was in ruins and only contained a large quantity of debris. The convent was restored by the Bank of Mexico in cooperation with the Instituto Nacional de Antropología e Historia (INAH). The entities state that the restoration project was difficult but was one of the most important undertaken in the past decades in the historic center. The building has four levels: ground floor, mezzanine, second and third floors, with an area of 3,700m^{2}. The restoration took fifteen years to complete and was concluded in 2004 at a cost of 1.6 million US dollars. In some areas, colonial era tiles were covered in fifteen layers of paint.

== The museum ==
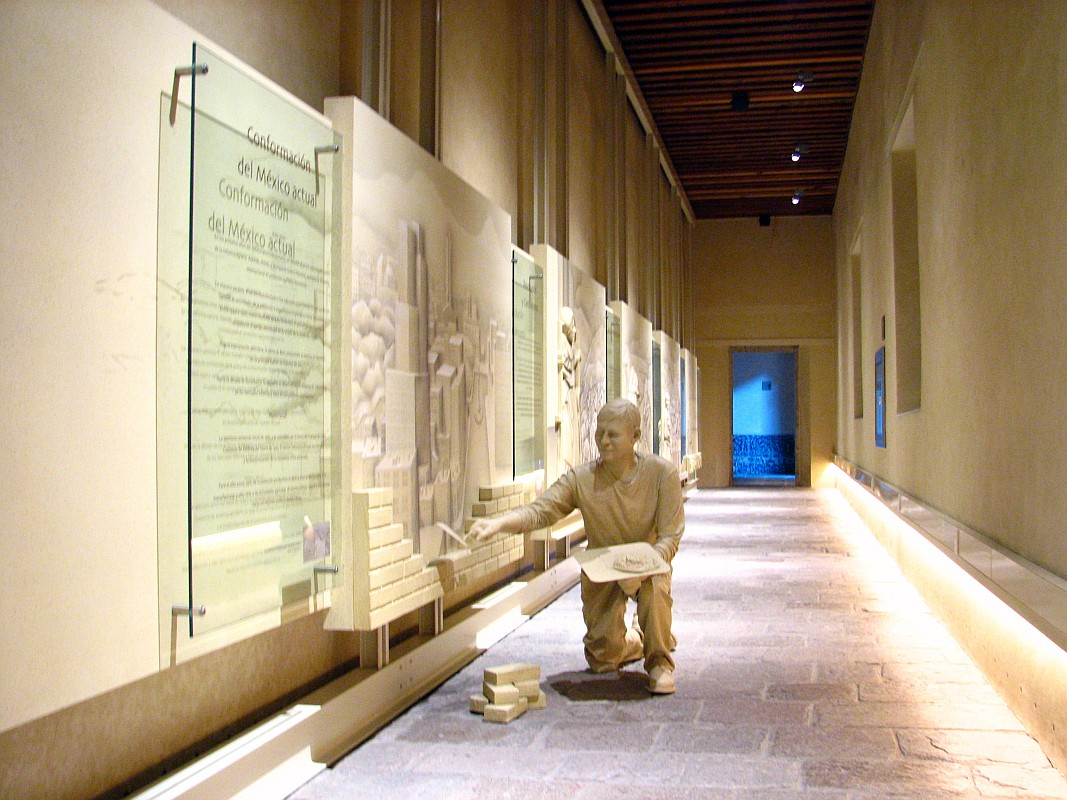
Entrance hall

The Interactive Museum of Economics is the first museum in the world dedicated exclusively to economics. The museum was opened in 2006 with the sponsorship of the Bank of Mexico, the Nacional Financiera and other government organizations. The museum is open to the public but its focus is on students, teachers and economic professional providing hands-on exhibits meant to be fun and engaging.

One reason for the museum is to promote economic education, which is not taught in public schools. The exhibits are aimed at breaking down basic economic concepts in demonstrating how every Mexican affects and is affected by the economy. One conception that the museum seeks to overcome is that economics is boring and only for experts and politicians. The museum's director also stresses that the museum only serves to educate and promote critical thinking about the science of economics, not a particular political point of view. The museum was awarded the Miguel Covarrubias Prize for the planning of the museum and restoration of the colonial era building. In 2007, the museum had 160,000 visitors and with the number of visitors to the museum growing each month.

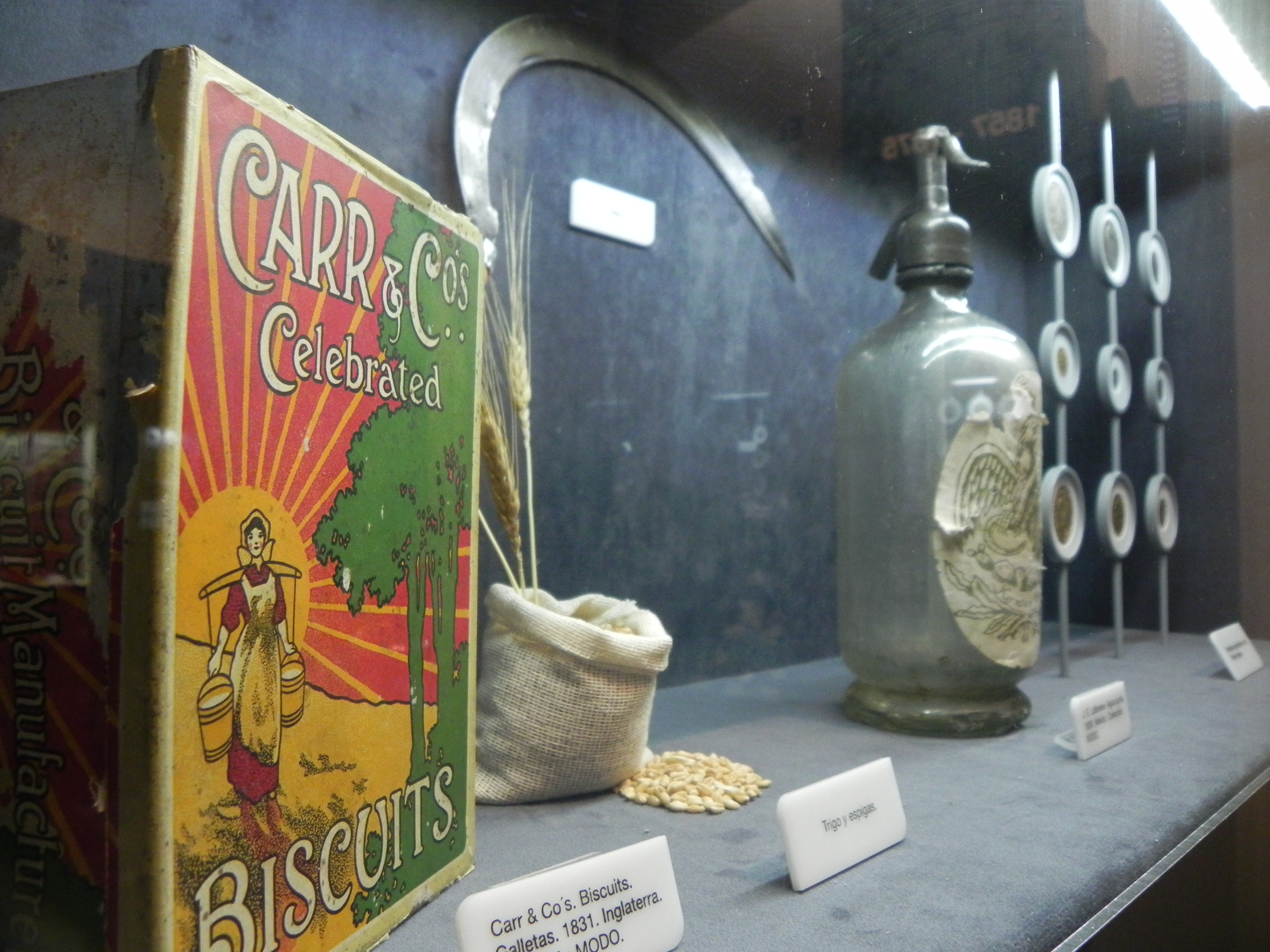
Objects in the museum

The museum has five areas "individual economics," "social economics," "economics and money," "government" and "welfare and development," containing more than fifty interactive exhibits which are distributed on three floors of the building. Visitors can visit a simulated market, observe how money is printed, start a corporation, design their own currency and observe governmental functions such as banking and regulation. It has databanks with educational resources, financial and consumer information and more. Unfortunately, only a few of the exhibits provide English descriptions.

MIDE added a new room to the museum called "The Future of Money." This area deals with electronic and other forms of payment. Technical issues covered include creating a digital identity and experimenting with different ways to pay electronically. One possible future innovation explored is the ability to print one's own credit card.

The museum also contains a large numismatic collection from the Bank of Mexico. The coin collection includes the most valuable collection of colonial era coins from Latin America.

The Foro Education portion of the museum foundation promotes courses, workshops, seminars and other activities to organizations outside the museum. These events can cover topics such as personal finance, consumer information as well as scholarly topics for professors and other professionals.

== Awards ==
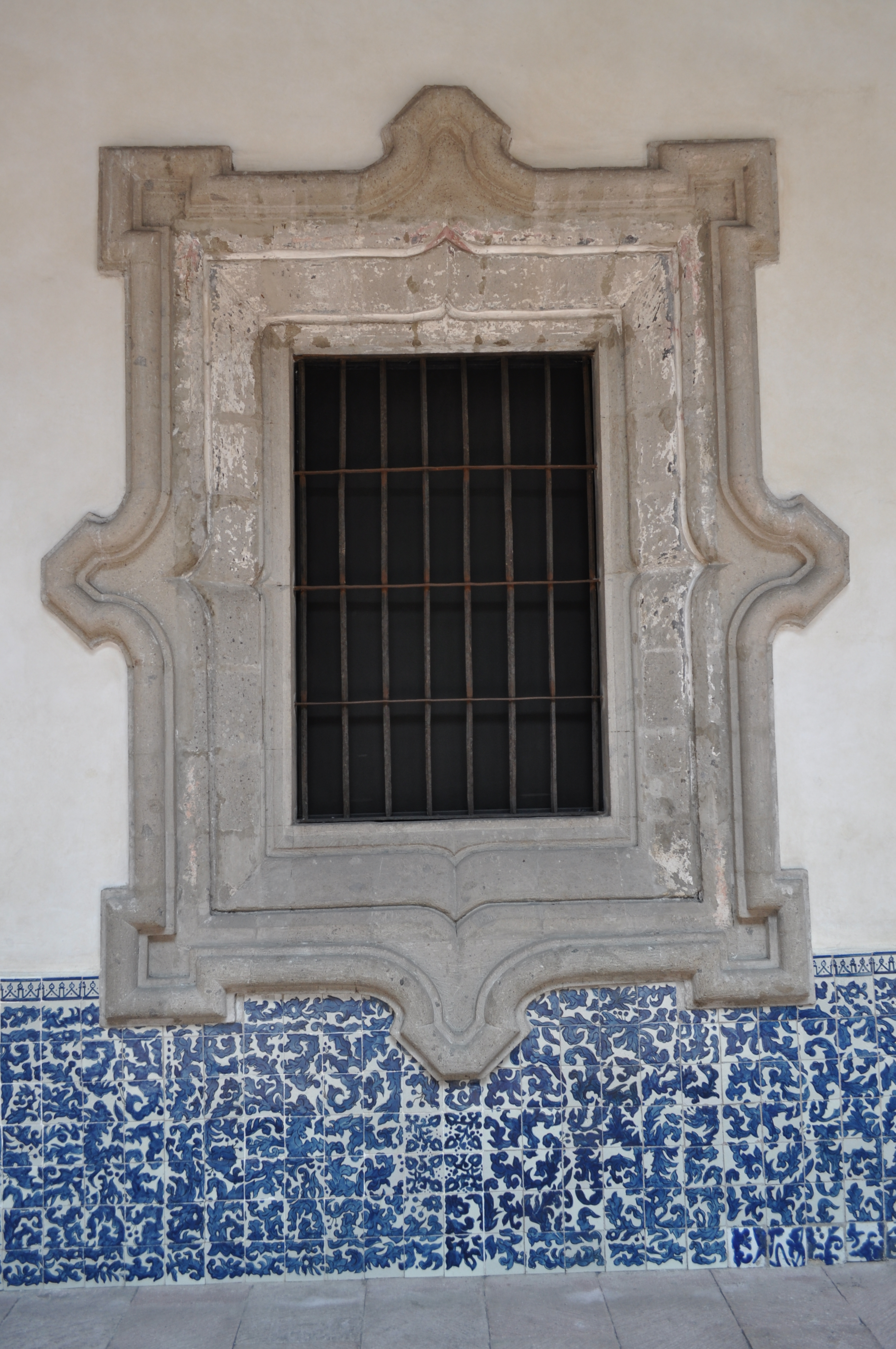
Colonial azulejo and window within the convent

- National Award Miguel Covarrubias, from Instituto Nacional de Antropología, INAH, best work on planning and design for museum open to the public in 2007.
- Gold Muse Award in 2007 by the American Association of Museums for the sección El simulador del mercado.
- Roy L. Shafer Leading Edge Award, in 2007 by the Association of Science and Technology Centers (ASTC), in the category for leadership and experience for the patrons.
- ID Iconos del Diseño in the category for architectural restoration and new use (entasis arquitectos, Alejandro de la Vega Zulueta y Ricardo Warman), by Conde Nast / Architectural Digest en 2007.
- Award by the International Council of museums AVICOM in the category for interactive stations in 2007.
- The Bank Interamericano de Desarrollo gave two awards to the program Adelante con tu futuro de BBVA Bancomer developed by MIDE in the categories LearnBanking y People’s Choice in 2010.
- Honorary mention Best Interiors of Latin America 2012 for the architectural and interior design (entasis arquitectos, Alejandro de la Vega Zulueta y Ricardo Warman) for the Sustainable Development wing: Economy, Society and nature given by IIDA International Interior Design Association y Bang&Olufsen

== See also ==
- List of colonial churches in Mexico City
