= HS Elektra =

Hungarian steamship

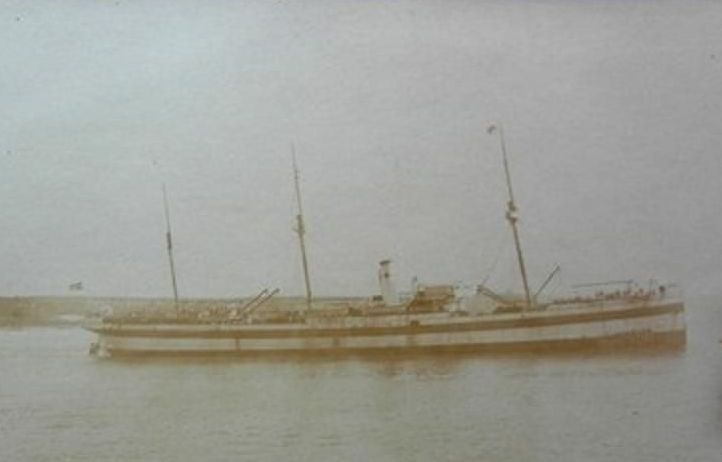
- HS Elektra

History

Austria-Hungary
- Name: Elektra
- Owner: 1883-1892-Lloyd Austro-Ungarico; 1892-1920-Lloyd Austriaco; 1920-1923-SA di Armamento Oceania
- Builder: Lloyd Austro-Ungarico, Trieste
- Laid down: April 1883
- Launched: November 1883
- Completed: April 1884
- Fate: Scrapped in 1923

General characteristics
- Type: Steamship
- Tonnage: 3,199 GRT
- Length: 116.3m
- Beam: 11.5m

HS Elektra, formerly known as SS Elektra, was a Hungarian steamship launched in 1883. In 1914, she was requisitioned into the Austrian-Hungarian Army to be used as a hospital ship. She was from then on called HS Elektra

== Construction ==
Elektra was built in Trieste for Lloyd Austro-Ungarico. She was laid down in April 1883, launched in November of the same year and completed in April 1884. She was assessed at 3,199 gross register tons with a length of 116.3m and a beam of 11.5m.

== Torpedoing ==
On 18 March 1916 Elektra was sailing through the Adriatic sea off Cape Planka, when the French Navy submarine Ampère spotted her. Ampère fired a torpedo which hit and damaged Elektra. Elektra was beached and re-entered service after repairs in September 1916.
