= HMS Electra =

Five ships of the Royal Navy have been named HMS Electra, after the Greek mythological figure, Electra:

- HMS Electra (1806) was a 16-gun brig-sloop launched in 1806 and wrecked in 1808.
- HMS Electra (1808) was a 16-gun brig-sloop, previously the French Espiegle. She was captured in 1808 by HMS Sybille and was sold in 1816.
- HMS Electra (1837) was an 18-gun sloop launched in 1837 and sold in 1862.
- HMS Electra (1896) was a Brazen-class destroyer launched in 1896 and reclassified as a C-class destroyer in 1913. She was sold for scrapping in 1920.
- HMS Electra (H27) was an E-class destroyer launched in 1934 and sunk in 1942.
