= Juan Armando Hinojosa =

Mexican contractor and business tycoon (born 1956)

- Born: January 3, 1956 (age 70); Reynosa, Tamaulipas, Mexico
- Occupations: Construction contractor and business tycoon
- Known for: Closely connected to the President, Enrique Peña Nieto

Juan Armando Hinojosa Cantú (born 3 January 1956) is a Mexican construction contractor and business tycoon.

He is closely connected to President Enrique Peña Nieto, who serves as his son's godfather. He was named in the Panama Papers in 2016 and the Pandora Papers in 2021.

A native of Reynosa, he moved to the State of Mexico in the 1980s and founded Grupo Higa.
