= Salinas y Rocha =

Salinas y Rocha (acronym: SYR) was a chain of Mexican department stores primarily selling appliances.

The history of the Salinas y Rocha chain dates back to 1906, when 22-year-old Benjamín Ricardo Salinas Westrup, a young entrepreneur from Monterrey, and his brother-in-law Joel Rocha decided to create "Benjamín Salinas y Compañía", manufacturing brass and iron beds and wooden furniture. Due to the Mexican Revolution the factory had to closed but in the 1920s, the company resurfaced. In downtown Monterrey, on Padre Mier Street near the corner of Zaragoza, they open the first Salinas y Rocha store. The strategy was to sell a lot, in small installments, with small profits. A few years later, the firm began its first expansion plan with the manufacturing of mattresses, and some time later, it implemented a new formula in the country: sales on credit: allowing customers to pay for the merchandise in installments. Salinas y Rocha and later the Elektra chain that emerged from it, become well-known most of all for their easy payment terms, thus allowing the working and lower-middle classes of Mexico to acquire home appliances.

Abandoned Salinas y Rocha Store in Roma Norte, Avenida de los Insurgentes Sur 171, Dec. 2014. Now Demolished.

In 1943, already in the hands of Hugo Salinas Rocha, son of Benjamín Salinas and grandfather of Ricardo Salinas Pliego, the firm entered the department store business, opening a store in Monterrey; The success was such that within two years there was a second store, this one in Mexico City. Sensing that the moment was favorable to start other businesses, in 1950 he started a new company named Elektra.

The brand new company, which over the years would become Salinas flagship business, showed that within the company things were not going as well. The creation of Elektra dented the alliance between the Salinas and the Rochas; In 1961, Hugo Salinas left the joint venture to dedicate himself full-time to Elektra – which was said to overshadow Salinas y Rocha – although he remained a shareholder.

Although on separate paths, both chains remained firm in their decision to continue with the same store format, so that for decades, Salinas y Rocha and Elektra went from being quite literally family, to being competitors.

En 1996 the El Puerto de Liverpool group bought Grupo Salinas y Rocha, then sold it in March 1999 to Grupo Elektra, part of Grupo Salinas and the 86 Salinas y Rochas format stores were largely folded into Elektra chain,. However, the Salinas group had owned 11 department stores, and Elektra sold these and some other assets back to El Puerto de Liverpool the next month (April 1999). Salinas y Rocha still exists as a product brand sold by Elektra stores and online.
