= Italika =

Mexican motorcycle company

- Type: Public Corporation
- Industry: Manufacturing
- Founded: 2005; 21 years ago
- Headquarters: Toluca, Mexico
- Area served: Mexico, Guatemala, Brazil, Honduras, Peru, Panama, El Salvador and Argentina
- Key people: Ricardo B. Salinas
- Products: motorcycles
- Parent: Grupo Salinas
- Website: https://www.italika.mx/

Comercializadora de Motocicletas de Calidad, S.A. de C.V., commonly known as Italika, is a Mexican motorcycle brand established on November 1, 2004, by Ricardo Salinas Pliego. Italika operates two assembly plants —one in Tlalpan, Mexico City, and another in Toluca, State of Mexico—and distributes products across Mexico, Guatemala, and Honduras. With over eight million customers, Italika is the top-selling motorcycle brand in Mexico.

The company markets its products through Elektra stores, its own agencies, self-service channels, Elektra Motos stores, official distributors and its online platform. Italika offers a diverse range of product lines and models, and in 2016, launched Italika Racing, a platform dedicated to promoting new talent in motorcycling sports.

== History ==
Italika began operations in 2004 under the initiative of businessman Ricardo Salinas Pliego. In 2008, it established an assembly plant in Toluca, State of Mexico, with a production capacity of 760,000 motorcycles annually. The company sold its millionth motorcycle on March 23, 2011, reaching two million units by 2014.

In 2015, Italika earned recognition as a Socially Responsible Company and, the following year, launched its first fully electric model along with the Italika Racing sports platform. The company opened its fifth production line in 2018, and by 2019, had reached five million customers.

In 2020, Italika introduced its second generation of electric vehicles, expanded its production capacity to 800,000 units annually in 2021, and surpassed seven million customers by 2022, earning its eighth consecutive Socially Responsible Company award.

In 2023, Italika reached eight million customers and partnered with the delivery company Rappi to provide road safety education for delivery drivers. According to Infobae, Italika now operates approximately 1,000 service centers.

== Assembly Plant ==
Italika's assembly plant, known as Ensamblika, is situated in the Toluca 2000 Industrial Park, State of Mexico. The facility comprises six assembly lines, achieving an annual production capacity of 850,000 motorcycles, with a maximum installed capacity of 1.2 million. On average, one motorcycle is assembled every sixty seconds on each line.

== Products ==
Italika offers a wide range of products divided into categories such as Motorcycles, Work, Z-Line, Sport, Dual Purpose, ATVs, Chopper, Vort-X, Crossover, Cafe Racer and Electric models. Additionally, Italika sells accessories and spare parts and operates a riding evaluation center in Mexico City, where customers can obtain their riding certificates. The company also provides after-sales support through its service centers, with all models carrying a two-year or 20,000-kilometer warranty.

=== Models ===
Italika makes models of street legal motorcycles.

- 90 cc (90 cm^{3}; 5.5 cu in) Underbone moped, or step-through motorcycle
- 125 cc (125 cm^{3}; 7.6 cu in) Standard Vespa-style scooter
- 125 cc (125 cm^{3}; 7.6 cu in) Motorcycle
- 150 cc (150 cm^{3}; 9.2 cu in) Standard Motorcycle and a scooter
- 175 cc (175 cm^{3}; 10.7 cu in) Standard Vespa-style scooter
- 180 cc (180 cm^{3}; 11 cu in) Motorcycle
- 200 cc (200 cm^{3}; 12.2 cu in) Motorcycle
- 250 cc (250 cm^{3}; 15.3 cu in) Standard and Sportbikes, and ATV's

Italika also makes a variety of offroad ATVs

== Italika Racing ==
In partnership with Lorenzo Competición México, Italika launched Italika Racing in 2016 to promote sport motorcycling and develop emerging talent, according to Business Insider. Italika Racing competitions use Italika models without modification, allowing for consistent tracking of new talent. Italika Racing has pioneered several initiatives, including the first children's electric motorcycle cup and participation in the Women's Circuit Racing World Championship, organized by Dorna Sports. This global event includes eight riders trained through Italika Racing, with Mexican Astrid Madrigal marking history as the first Mexican rider in this championship.

=== Championships ===
==== Talento Italika Junior ====
This youth-focused series, certified as a Road to MotoGP program and endorsed by the Mexican Motorcycling Federation, is aimed at riders up to 17 years old. The championship includes the DM 125 Cup, Vort-X 200 Cup, and RT 250 Cup, with its first event held in September 2017 in Querétaro.

==== Talento Italika ====
Targeted at riders aged 12-21 with prior competitive experience, this series, certified as a Road to MotoGP and endorsed by the Mexican Motorcycling Federation, currently features the Vort-X 300 Cup. Like the Junior Championship, it launched its inaugural season in 2017.

==== Italika Women’s International Cup ====
The Italika Women's International Cup is a Latin American women’s championship certified as a Road to MotoGP event and endorsed by FIMLA. Notable champions include Astrid Madrigal and rider Sara Varón. Other championships organized by Italika include the Ibero-American Women's Championship, featuring the Vort-X 500 model in a single-event format, and the Latin American Youth Championship, a mixed competition for riders aged 12 to 20 using Vort-X 300 motorcycles.

=== Featured Riders ===
Prominent riders include Mexican Astrid Madrigal, a two-time champion of the Italika Women's International Cup and Latin American champion, and Colombian rider Sara Varón, who competed as part of the first Latin American team in Spain’s ESBK Supersport 300 Championship. Both riders trained in Italika’s high-performance centers, representing Latin America in international championships.

=== High Performance Centers (CIAR) ===
Italika's High-Performance Centers (in Spanish, Centros Italika de Alto Rendimiento or CIAR) were established to promote motorcycling sports across all socioeconomic levels and develop talent from a young age. Italika operates three CIAR facilities: in Sierra Esmeralda and Villa del Carbón in the State of Mexico, and in Guadalajara, Jalisco.
