= Electra Lake =

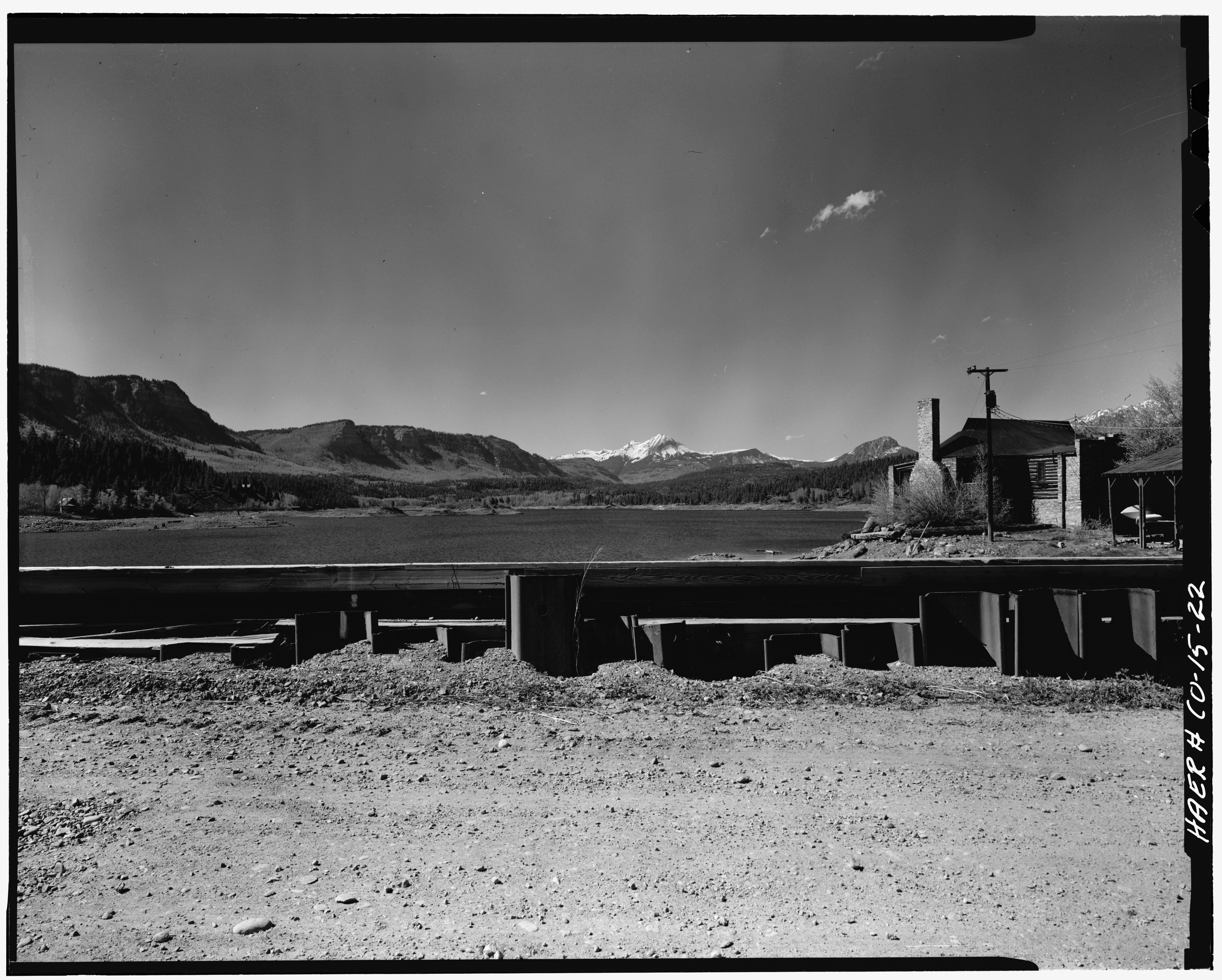

- Location within Colorado Location within the United States
- Location: La Plata County, Colorado
- Coordinates: 37°34′08″N 107°48′32″W
- Type: reservoir
- Primary inflows: Cascade Creek
- Primary outflows: Tacoma Generating Station
- Basin countries: United States
- Water volume: 22,000 acre⋅ft (27 hm^{3})
- Surface elevation: 2,544 m (8,346 ft)

Electra Lake is a privately owned reservoir in La Plata County Colorado. Owned by Xcel Energy, Electra Lake provides water storage for the Tacoma Hydro Generating Station. The reservoir's maximum capacity is 29,800 acre⋅ft (9.7 billion US gal; 36.8 billion L).

== History ==
Electra Lake Dam, also known as Terminal Dam or Cascade #2, is a rockfill structure with a height of 103 ft (31 m) and a length of 1,275 ft (389 m) at its crest, completed in 1902. The lake was named after Electra, a character in mythology. It has a normal surface area of 1.3 sq mi (3.4 km^{2}).

No hydroelectric energy is produced at the dam; water is channeled 18 mi (29 km) offsite to the Tacoma Hydro Generating Station via a 4,400 ft (1,300 m) open wooden flume, "one of only two wooden flumes still operating on hydro projects in the United States." The Tacoma powerhouse stands in the Animas River Canyon and is accessible only by the Durango and Silverton Narrow Gauge Railroad.

Owned and operated by Xcel Energy, the dam was rebuilt in 1980.

== Recreation and marinas ==
The lake is open to the public for fee use during the summer months.
