= Hugo Salinas Price =

Mexican business magnate and investor (born 1932)

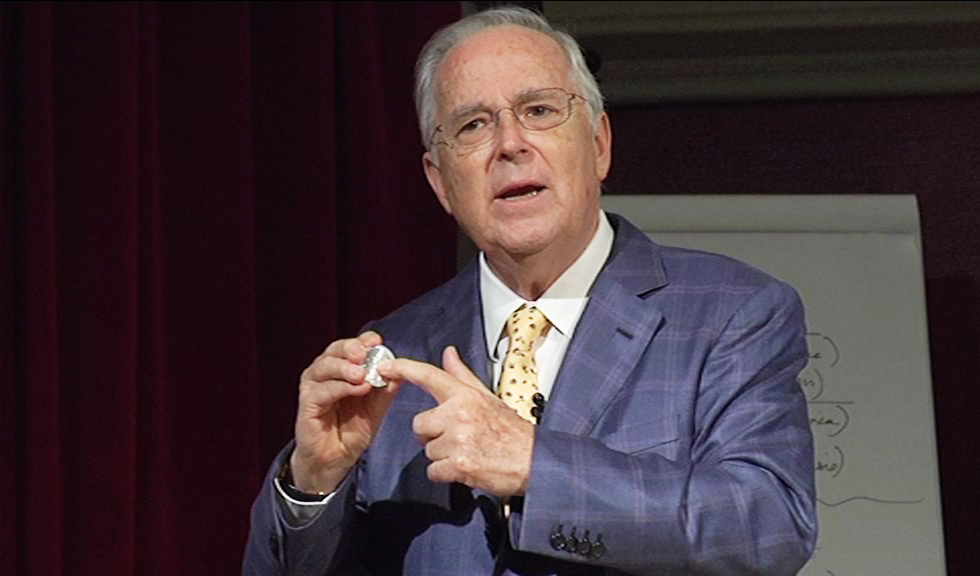
- Hugo Salinas Price in 2009
- Born: March 11, 1932 (age 94); Bryn Athyn, Pennsylvania, U.S.
- Other name: Hugo Benjamin Salinas
- Education: Wharton School, University of Pennsylvania; Instituto Tecnológico y de Estudios Superiores de Monterrey (ITESM); Universidad Nacional Autónoma de México (UNAM)
- Occupation: Electronics Retailer (Retired)
- Spouse: Esther Pliego de Salinas
- Children: Ricardo Salinas Pliego; Esther Salinas Pliego; Guillermo Salinas Pliego; Rebeca Salinas Pliego; Norah Emilia Salinas Pliego
- Parent(s): Hugo Salinas Rocha; Norah Price

Hugo Salinas Price (born March 11, 1932) is a Mexican business magnate, investor, and philanthropist. He is the founder of Mexico's Elektra retail chain.

He also owns the second largest gold mine and silver mines in the state of Durango.

== Biography ==
Salinas was born on March 11, 1932 in Bryn Athyn, Pennsylvania, his mother's home town. His uncle Benjamin Salinas Westrup, along with his step-brother Joel Rocha, founded the furniture company Salinas y Rocha, which grew rapidly thanks to the possibility to pay with credit.

He graduated from the Academy of the New Church Secondary Schools in 1949. He studied at the Wharton School from University of Pennsylvania, at the Instituto Tecnológico y de Estudios Superiores de Monterrey (ITESM) and law from the Universidad Nacional Autónoma de México (UNAM).

Elektra began as a factory assembling electronic appliances for the Salinas y Rocha chain, a national retailer of appliances. Hugo Salinas Price became director of the company in 1952, and opened its first store Elektra in 1959. Elektra then set up a direct sales operation offering appliances on installments. By 1968, Elektra had opened 12 stores nationwide. Hugo Salinas Price retired from the company in 1987, leaving the 59-store retail network to his son Ricardo Salinas Pliego.

== Other roles ==
- Since 1997: founder and president of Mexican Civic Association Pro Silver, A.C.
- Since 1993: Honorary president of Grupo Elektra

== Books ==
- Salinas Price, Hugo (1996). La plata: El camino para México (in Mexican Spanish). Diana. ISBN 978-9681329426.
- Salinas Price, Hugo (2000). Mis años con Elektra (in Mexican Spanish). Diana. ISBN 978-9681332563.
