= Electra (mythology) =

Set of mythological Greek characters

In Greek mythology, Electra or Elektra (/ɪˈlɛktrə/; Greek: Ἠλέκτρα, Ēlektra, "amber") was the name of the following women:

- Electra (Oceanid), one of the Oceanids who was the wife of Thaumas and mother of Iris and the Harpies.
- Electra (Pleiad), one of the Pleiades.
- Electra, one of the Danaids, daughter of Danaus, king of Libya and the naiad Polyxo. She married and later killed her husband Peristhenes or Hyperantus following the commands of her father.
- Electra, daughter of Agamemnon and Clytemnestra.
- Electra, handmaiden of Helen who fastened her mistress' sandals when she went to the walls of Troy.
- Electra, sister of Cadmus, of whom he named after the Electran gate at Thebes. She might be instead the mother of Cadmus because later writers noted that the other name for his mother Telephassa was Electra.
