= Fundación Azteca =

Mexican non-profit organization

Fundación Azteca logo

Fundación Azteca is a Mexican non-profit organization that promotes social responsibility founded in 1997 and owned by Grupo Salinas.

It attempts to match social needs with organizations or individual willing to commit to satisfy them. Its chief executive officer (CEO) is Esteban Moctezuma, former cabinet member during the presidency of Ernesto Zedillo.

Fundación Azteca has organized education, health, environment and sports programs. I has also collaborated with other organizations, private companies and individuals as a medium of awareness of their projects.

This organization is registered with manosalaobra.org, a registry of more than 450 non-profit social organizations. Fundación Azteca has awarded 12,900 scholarships for low-income secondary and high school students through its educational project Plantel Azteca.

== Programs ==
=== Juguetón ===
More than 13 million toys have also been given to children through the annual Juguetón ("Toy marathon").

=== A Quien Corresponda ===
The TV Azteca show A Quien Corresponda ("To Whom It May concern") its part of the effort by Fundación Azteca of assistance to the community.

=== Rompiendo el Silencio ===
The campaign Rompiendo el Silencio ("Breaking the silence") has assisted more than 300 children by providing them with hearing aids and costly cochlear implants throughout the country.

== Awards ==
- Vienna Civil Society Award by the United Nations for its efforts in the prevention of drug use with the campaign Vive Sin Drogas.
