= Electra (Wijesinha play) =

1970 play by Rajiva Wijesinha

Electra (A play in three Acts)
- Author: Rajiva Wijesinha
- Language: English
- Publisher: Literary Publications
- Publication date: 1986
- Publication place: Sri Lanka
- Media type: Print

Electra is a play by Rajiva Wijesinha. It is based on the Oresteia by Aeschylus, Electra by Sophocles, Electra by Euripides and The Flies by Jean-Paul Sartre. It was written in 1970, but a radio production in early 1971 was banned because of political sensitivity. The play was finally presented on radio by the Sri Lanka Broadcasting Corporation in 1985, at which time a public reading was also held at the British Council in Colombo.
