= Ricardo Salinas Pliego =

Mexican billionaire businessman

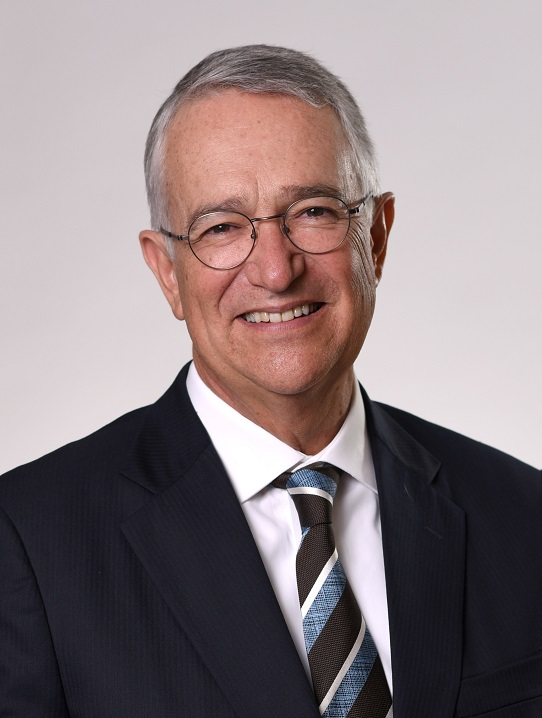
- Ricardo Salinas Pliego
- Born: Ricardo Benjamín Salinas Pliego; 19 October 1955 (age 70); Mexico City, Mexico
- Education: Tecnológico de Monterrey; Tulane University (MBA)
- Occupation: Business magnate
- Known for: Founder of Grupo Salinas
- Title: Chairman, CEO of Grupo Salinas and TV Azteca
- Spouses: Ninfa Sada Garza; María Laura Medina
- Children: 6, including Ninfa
- Parent(s): Hugo Salinas Price; Esther Pliego
- Website: www.ricardosalinas.com

Ricardo Benjamín Salinas Pliego (born 19 October 1955) is a Mexican business magnate, founder and chairman of Grupo Salinas, a corporate conglomerate with interests in telecommunications, media, financial services, and retail.

An outspoken supporter of libertarianism, he is the third richest person in Mexico and the 172nd richest person in the world with an estimated net worth of US$13.6 billion in February 2021. He is the 7th wealthiest person in Latin America.

== Career ==
Ricardo Salinas Pliego is a CPA graduate of the Instituto Tecnológico y de Estudios Superiores de Monterrey (ITESM). After earning an MBA at Tulane University, he joined Elektra in 1981 as import manager. Between 1981 and 1986, Salinas experimented with other businesses such as a restaurant in Monterrey, satellite dishes and the sale of systems multi communication.

In 1987, Salinas succeeded his father, Hugo Salinas Price, as chief executive officer of Grupo Elektra. The company originated as a family-owned furniture manufacturer, Salinas & Rocha, founded in 1906 by his great-grandfather, Benjamín Salinas.

Salinas is also chairman of TV Azteca, one of the world's two largest producers of Spanish-language television programming. Under his leadership, TV Azteca broke Mexico's long-standing television monopoly through the successful privatization of a media package offered by the government.

In 2003, Salinas bought Iusacell (the first cell phone company in Mexico) and four years later, merged it with Unefon, another cell phone company, founded by him in 1999. However, in early 2015, Grupo Salinas announced the sale of Iusacell to AT&T

Salinas has participated and addressed The World Economic Forum, The Economist Roundtable on Mexico, the Young Presidents' Organization, UCLA, the Institute of the Americas, Harvard Business School and TED, where he discussed issues related to globalization, education, entrepreneurship, freedom and opportunity in the BOP. He also has a blog where he publishes his business, political, economic and cultural ideas. His articles have been published in The New York Times, The Boston Globe, The Hill, Newsweek in Spanish, La Opinión, and regularly writes in the Mexican press. Mr. Salinas was the first Mexican to elect the board of trustees of the Aspen Institute.

It was announced in 2020 that Salinas had 10% of his liquid portfolio invested in Bitcoin.

On 15 September 2025, Salinas launched his own political party, the Anti-Crime and Anti-Corruption Movement (MAAC), intended to compete in the 2030 Mexican general election.

== Philanthropy ==
In 1997, Salinas founded Fundación Azteca, a nonprofit organization that supports programs in healthcare, nutrition, education, and environmental protection. The foundation provides funding to other charitable organizations.

In April 2021, the Ricardo B. Salinas Pliego Center was inaugurated. The center promotes discussion and initiatives related to six areas: freedom, rule of law, education, leadership, art and culture, and innovation and entrepreneurship.

== See also ==
- List of Mexican billionaires
- List of people named in the Panama Papers
