= Grupo Salinas =

Mexican corporate conglomerate

- Type: Mexican conglomerate
- Industry: Sports, automobiles, internet, media
- Founded: 1906 (as Salinas y Rocha)
- Founder: Benjamín Ricardo Salinas Westrup; Joel Rocha
- Headquarters: Tlalpan, Mexico City, Mexico.
- Area served: Worldwide
- Key people: (CEO); Ricardo Salinas Pliego
- Number of employees: 110,000 (2020)
- Website: www.gruposalinas.com

Grupo Salinas is a corporate conglomerate formed in 2001 by several Mexican companies. The group consists of TV Azteca, Grupo Elektra, Telecosmo, and Italika. Each of these companies operates independently with its own management and board of directors.

== History ==
The origin of Grupo Salinas begins with a store called Salinas y Rocha founded in 1906 in Monterrey. It was founded by businessmen Benjamín Ricardo Salinas Westrup and Joel Rocha.

In 1950, Grupo Elektra began as a radio factory. Two years later, the company began manufacturing television sets and increased its workforce to 70 employees. Elektra began selling products directly to consumers in 1954. In 1957, Elektra retail stores incorporated credit programs. By 1968, Elektra had 12 stores in the region and by 1987, 59 stores. Elektra Group was listed on the Bolsa Mexicana de Valores, the Mexican Stock Exchange, in 1993.

In 1993, Grupo Elektra bought the Imevisión government television network and renamed it as TV Azteca. The network went public with an initial public offering on the Mexican and New York stock exchanges in 1997.

In 2012, Grupo Elektra acquired payday lender Advance America for an estimated US$780 million.

In 2003, Grupo Salinas purchased the telecommunications company Iusacell and the mobile phone company Unefón. Iusacell was sold to AT&T in 2014, and was later rebranded as AT&T Mexico. Unefón was also sold to AT&T Mexico.

In March 2019, Grupo Salinas made an investment of an undisclosed amount in OneWeb, a company developing and fielding a satellite internet constellation to deliver broadband internet services. The total raise was US$1.25 billion to help build out the operational system following a successful first launch of technology that had been under development since 2015.

== See also ==
- Hugo Salinas Price
- Ricardo Salinas Pliego
