= List of Spanish-language television networks in the United States =

The following is a list of Spanish-language television networks in the United States. As of 2026, the largest Hispanic/Latino television audiences in the U.S. are in California (Los Angeles, Bakersfield, San Diego, Sacramento, San Francisco area), New York (New York City), Washington, D.C., Florida (Miami area, Orlando, Tampa/St. Petersburg area), Texas (Houston, Dallas, Austin, Ft. Worth, San Antonio, Rio Grande Valley), Illinois (Chicago), Georgia (Atlanta), Pennsylvania (Philadelphia), Colorado (Denver), Utah (Salt Lake City), Ohio (Cleveland, Columbus), Indiana (Indianapolis), Massachusetts (Boston), Connecticut (Hartford), Minnesota (Minneapolis/St. Paul), Wisconsin (Milwaukee), Louisiana (New Orleans), Tennessee (Nashville), Michigan (Detroit), North Carolina (Raleigh/Durham), Virginia (Richmond), Nevada (Las Vegas), and Arizona (Phoenix).

== Major networks ==
TV network	Founded	Owner	% of U.S. households reached	# of households viewable	# of Full-power affiliates	# of Low-power/Class-A affiliates and transmitters
Univision	1987	TelevisaUnivision	49%	94,100,000	62	26
Estrella TV	2009	MediaCo (owned by HPS Investment Partners & Standard General)	46%	64,232,000	38	29
Telemundo	1984	NBCUniversal	61.6%	192,476,422	54	46

== Specialty networks ==
Title	Launch date	Owner	Notes
3ABN Latino	2003	Three Angels Broadcasting Network	
24 Horas	1997	Radiotelevisión Española (RTVE)	Available in Puerto Rico on ABC affiliated station WORA
América Tevé	1995	America CV Network	
Antena 3 Internacional	1996	Atresmedia	The international version of the spanish channel
Almavision	2002	Almavision Hispanic Network	
América Internacional		Plural TV	
Aplauso	2019	Olympusat Inc.	
Atrescine	2018	Atresmedia	
Atreseries	2015	Atresmedia	The international version of the spanish channel of the same name. The international version launched before the spanish channel
Bandamax	1996	TelevisaUnivision	
Beat Box	2016	Megacable	
BeIN Sports en Español	2012	beIN Media Group	
BeIN Sports Xtra en Español	2019	beIN Media Group	Available on OTA affiliates
Canal 6	1968	Grupo Multimedios	
Canal 22 Internacional	2004	Secretariat of Culture	
Canal Once	1959	Instituto Politécnico Nacional	
Canal SUR	1992	SUR, LLC	
Caracol Internacional	2003	Caracol Televisión	
CentroAmerica TV	2004	Hemisphere Media Group	
CGTN Spanish	2007	China Central Television	
CNN en Español	1997	Skydance Corporation	
Cinema Dinamita	2013	América Móvil	
Cinemáx	2001	Skydance Corporation	Spanish-language premium television channel that broadcasts movies dubbed in spanish
Cine Estelar	2012	Carlos Vasallo	
Cinelatino	1993	MVS Comunicaciones	
Cinema	2015	TV Azteca	
Cine Mexicano	2005	Olympusat Inc.	
Cine Nostalgia	2011	Carlos Vasallo	
Clan	2005	Radiotelevisión Española (RTVE)	
Clic	2000	TV Azteca	
Corazón	2008	TV Azteca	
Cubamax TV			Available on Dish Network channel 851
Cubaplay+	2011	Olympusat Inc.	
Cubavisión International	1986	ICRT	
Daystar Español	2025	Daystar Television Network	
De Película	1991	TelevisaUnivision	Movie channel that has a classic version
De Película Clásico	1994	TelevisaUnivision	Classic version of De Película
Discovery en Español	1998	Skydance Corporation	
Discovery Familia	2007	Skydance Corporation	
Dominican View		Supercanal, S.A.	
Ecuador TV International	2007		
Ecuavisa International			
EJTV	2000	TBN Enlace USA	
El Trece Internacional	2009	Artear	International feed of El Trece
ESNE TV	2002	El Sembrador Ministries	
Estrella News	2021	Estrella TV	Available on Estrella TV affiliates
ESPN Deportes	2004	The Walt Disney Company	
Esperanza TV	2003	Hope Channel	
EWTN Español	2023	EWTN	
Fox Deportes	1997	Fox Corporation	
Galavisión	1979	TelevisaUnivision	
Gran Cine	2008	Olympusat Inc.	
HBO Latino	2000	Skydance Corporation	Spanish-language premium television channel
HITN	1983	Hispanic Information and Telecommunications Network	
History en Español	2004	The Walt Disney Company(50%) Hearst Communications(50%)(A&E Networks)	
Hogar de HGTV	2020	Skydance Corporation	
¡Hola! TV		Atresmedia	
HTV	1995	Skydance Corporation	
Ingles Para Todos	2018	2042 Media	
Inmigrante TV	2010	Manuel Solis	
La 1	1956	Radiotelevisión Española (RTVE)	
La 2	1966	Radiotelevisión Española (RTVE)	
Las Estrellas Internacional	1988	TelevisaUnivision	
LATV	2007	LATV Networks	Bilingual English/Spanish
Maríavisión	1993		
Mexicanal	2005	Castalia Communications, Innokap	
Meganoticias MX	1990	Megacable	
Mega TV	2006	Spanish Broadcasting System	
MTV Tres	1998	Skydance Corporation	
MiCasa Network			
Milenio Televisión	2008	Grupo Multimedios	
Mira TV			
Multimedios Televisión		Grupo Multimedios	
Nat Geo Mundo	2011	The Walt Disney Company	Spanish-language version of National Geographic
Newsmax en Español	2024	Newsmax Media	
NTN24	2008	RCN Televisión	
Nuestra Visión	2017	América Móvil	
N+ Foro	2010	TelevisaUnivision	Univision’s news network
Novelisima	2021		
Pasiones	2008	Hemisphere Media Group	
Perú Mágico	2004	Movistar TV (Media Networks Latin America)	
Playboy TV en Español		Aylo	PPV
PX Sports	2011		
Real Madrid TV	1999	Real Madrid CF	
RCN Novelas	2009	RCN Televisión	
RCN Nuestra Tele	2003	RCN Televisión	
Semillitas	2007	SOMOSTV	
¡Sorpresa!	2003	Olympusat Inc.	
Sony Cine	2012	Sony Pictures Television	Spanish-language version of Sony Movies
Star TVE	2015	Radiotelevisión Española	
Starz Encore Español	2011	Lionsgate Television (Starz Inc.)	
Super Canal	2000	Supercanal, S.A.	
SUR Perú	2005	SUR, LLC	
Tarima	2013	SPLEX One	
TBN Enlace USA	2002	Trinity Broadcasting Network	
TC Internacional	2021	Comunica EP, CAEC Televisión	
TDV	2007	V-Me Media	
TeleCentro	2008	Albavisión	
Teledeporte	1994	Radiotelevisión Española (RTVE)	
TeleFórmula	2000	Radio Fórmula	
Tele El Salvador		Supercanal, S.A.	
Telemicro Internacional	2016	Hemisphere Media Group	
Tele N	2014	Olympusat Inc.	
Telefe Internacional	2000	Grupo Televisión Litoral	
TeleHit	1993	TelevisaUnivision	
TeleHit Música	1993	TelevisaUnivision	
TeleXitos	2012	NBCUniversal	
Teleritmo		Grupo Multimedios	
TeLe-Romántica	2012		
Telesur	2005	SiBCI	
Telemicro Internacional	2016	Hemisphere Media Group	
Teleritmo		Grupo Multimedios	Also known as TLR
Televisión Dominicana	2000	Hemisphere Media Group	
Tele Vida Abundante	1985	Centro Christiano Vida Abundante	
Teveo	2013	America CV Network	
Todo Noticias	1993	Clarín Group	
TUDN	2012	TelevisaUnivision	Univision’s sports network
TV Chile	1989	Televisión Nacional de Chile	
TVE Internacional	1989	Radiotelevisión Española (RTVE)	International feed of TVE
TV Perú Internacional	2017	Ministerio de Cultura	
TV Venezuela	2006		Also known as TVV
TyC Sports	1994	Torneos y Competencias/Clárin Group	
Ultra HD Plex	2012	Olympusat Inc.	12 Spanish-language premium channels
UniMás	2013	TelevisaUnivision	Sister TV network to Univision
Universo	2015	NBCUniversal	Began as GEMS Television in 1993 and Mun2 in 2005
Univision Tlnovelas	2012	TelevisaUnivision	
VePlus			
Video Rola	1998	Megacable	
Video Rola Plus	2014	Megacable	
ViendoMovies	2006	SOMOSTV	
Vision Latina	2022	Iglesia Universal	
V-me	2007	V-Me Media	
Vme Kids	2010	V-Me Media	V-me’s Kids channel
WAPA America	2004	Hemisphere Media Group (WAPA Media Group)	
WAPA Deportes	2004	Hemisphere Media Group (WAPA Media Group)	
Win+ Fútbol	2020	DirecTV, RCN Televisión	Sports channel owned by DirecTV And RCN Televisión
Zee Mundo	2016	Zee Entertainment Enterprises	

== Defunct networks ==
Title	Year est.	Year ceased	Notes
América CV	2007	2015	Began as CaribeVisiòn in 2007; rebranded CV Network in 2009
Azteca América	2001	2022	Azteca name and branding was licensed from TV Azteca and Grupo Salinas.
GEMS Television	1993	2001	Currently Universo
Hispanic Television Network	2000	2003	
LAT TV	2006	2008	
La Familia	1994	2015	
La Familia Cosmovision	1979	2014	
MundoFox	2012	2015	Became MundoMax in 2015
MundoMax	2015	2016	
NuvoTV	2004	2015	
NetSpan	1984	1987	Became Telemundo circa 1987
Spanish International Network	1962	1987	Became Univision circa 1987
Soi TV	2011	2013	
TeleFutura	2002	2013	became UniMás on January 7, 2013
TuVisión	2007	2009	
VasalloVision	2009	2012	

== See also ==
- List of Spanish-language newspapers published in the United States
- List of Spanish-language magazines in the United States
- Category:Spanish-language radio in the United States

== Bibliography ==
- "Spanish-Language TV Undergoing Growth Spurt", The New York Times, September 10, 1986
- Steve Beale (December 1986), "New Ownership Transforms Spanish-language TV", Hispanic Business, ISSN 0199-0349
- "Media Business: Spanish-Language TV Grows Up", The New York Times, July 7, 1988
- Federico A. Subervi-Velez (1994). "Mass Communication and Hispanics: Television". Handbook of Hispanic Cultures in the United States: Sociology. Houston, Texas: Arte Público Press. pp. 334+. ISBN 1558851011 – via Google Books.
- America Rodriguez (1997). "Creating an Audience and Remapping a Nation: A Brief History of U.S. Spanish Language Broadcasting, 1930—1980". Quarterly Review of Film and Video. 16: 357–374. doi:10.1080/10509209709361470.
- Margaret A. Blanchard, ed. (2013) [1998]. "Hispanic Media". History of the Mass Media in the United States: An Encyclopedia. Routledge. ISBN 978-1-135-91749-4.
- America Rodriguez (1999). Making Latino News: Race, Language, Class. Sage. ISBN 978-0-7619-1552-2. (Includes discussion of Spanish language TV)
- Alan Albarran, ed. (2009). Handbook of Spanish Language Media. Routledge.
- Rocío Rivadeneyra (2011). "Gender and Race Portrayals on Spanish-Language Television". Sex Roles. 65.
- "Guide to Hispanic Networks" (PDF), Broadcasting & Cable, October 1, 2012, ISSN 1068-6827, "Special Report in Multichannel News and Broadcasting & Cable"
- "Spate of Rebranding for Spanish-Language TV", The New York Times, December 2, 2012
- Dale Kunkel; et al. (2013). "Food Marketing to Children on U.S. Spanish-Language Television". Journal of Health Communication. 18.
- Matthew Eshbaugh-Soha; Christine Balarezo (2014). "The President on Spanish-Language Television News". Social Science Quarterly. 95.
- Charles M. Tatum, ed. (2014). "Spanish-Language Television". Encyclopedia of Latino Culture. ABC-CLIO. pp. 835–848. ISBN 978-1-4408-0099-3.
- Dana Mastro; et al. (2015). "Latinos' Perceptions of Intergroup Relations in the United States: The Cultivation of Group-Based Attitudes and Beliefs from English- and Spanish-Language Television". Journal of Social Issues. 71.
- Kenton T. Wilkinson (2016). Spanish-Language Television in the United States: Fifty Years of Development. Routledge. ISBN 978-1-317-68859-4.
