= European News Exchange =

International television broadcast association

The European News Exchange (short: ENEX) is an association of commercial TV broadcasters. Coordinated by the ENEX Centre in Luxembourg, ENEX members share their news content and news production resources to gain competitive advantages in newsgathering. ENEX began as a technical service platform and has developed into a news provider that gathers daily news video stories from its members in a news pool. All ENEX content is available to its members for free. To ensure exclusivity, usually only one channel per territory is allowed to join.

== History and Membership ==
On 14 December 1993, managers from RTL Television, RTL Belgium, RTL Nederland, M6 in France, and corporate parent of the latter CLT (Compagnie Luxembourgeoise de Télédiffusion, later to become RTL Group) met in Luxembourg to found the European News Exchange. The initial goal was to combine the resources of the different TV channels and to reduce costs by sharing news footage, technical facilities, and satellite space. ENEX started operating in 1994.

In 1996, ENEX merged with the "News Consortium" consisting of CBS, Sky News, VTM Belgium, and TBS Japan. The members of the News Consortium joined ENEX, then operating one digital and one analogue satellite channel. Ten years after its inception, 30 ENEX members were making tens of thousands of bookings on 10 satellite channels and exchanging more than 5,000 news stories per year.

In 2003, ENEX digitised the picture exchange; all news stories were now recorded on a server. The following year, the number of items nearly doubled when footage from CBS Newspath was added. In 2005, ENEX introduced News Link, a system for the transmission and exchange of content via the internet on a file-sharing basis.

In 2022 ENEX had 55 members with more than 75 channels operating globally. ENEX maintains 8 digital satellite channels on Eutelsat 16A. All ENEX members contribute and receive content from all over the world via the News Exchange Platform (NEP), successor to News Link. In 2022, ENEX members delivered more than 35,000 items of video content and 3,000 live signals.

ENEX cooperates with the Alianza Informativa Latinoamericana (AIL), a similar collaborative news organization in Latin America. ENEX, in 2018, had 14 Latin American partners. In 2015 ENEX began to expand into the Middle East, where the partnership has four members.

ENEX operates an MCR interconnected with partners and major institutions via IP, fiber, and satellite. LiveU Matrix technology is used for live news content streaming.

One of the most recent members is LNK, one of the major commercial TV channels in Lithuania.

== Full list of ENEX members ==
=== Current ===
List of ENEX members
Channel	Country
Artear	Argentina
Telearuba	Aruba
Sky News Australia	Australia
Servus TV	Austria
N1	Balkan Peninsula
RTL-TVI	Belgium
VTM	Belgium
Grupo Bandeirantes	Brazil
bTV	Bulgaria
SMG	China
ANT1 Cyprus	Cyprus
Caracol Televisión	Colombia
RTL Televizija	Croatia
TeleCuraçao	Curaçao
TV Nova	Czech Republic
TV 2	Denmark
Grupo SIN	Dominican Republic
Ecuavisa	Ecuador
Delfi	Estonia
MTV3	Finland
BFM TV	France
M6	France
RTL Television	Germany
ANT1	Greece
TV Azteca Guate	Guatemala
RTL Klub	Hungary
Rudaw	Iraq
The Journal	Ireland
Sýn	Iceland
Canal 12	Israel
TBS	Japan
LNK	Lithuania
RTL Lëtzebuerg	Luxembourg
Telma TV	North Macedonia
Map TV News	Morocco
TV Azteca	Mexico
TV Vijesti	Montenegro
TVC News	Nigeria
TV 2	Norway
RTL 4	Netherlands
Eco TV	Panama
Telefuturo	Paraguay
TVN	Poland
SIC	Portugal
TeleOnce	Puerto Rico
Pro TV	Romania
Markiza	Slovakia
POP TV	Slovenia
Telecinco	Spain
TV4	Sweden
TVBS	Republic of China
NTV	Turkey
1+1	Ukraine
Al Arabiya	United Arab Emirates
Sky News	United Kingdom
CBS	United States

=== Former ===
Channel	Country
Telefe	Argentina
ATV	Aruba
ANS TV	Azerbaijan
Real TV	Azerbaijan
Unitel	Bolivia
Canal 13	Chile
Mega	Chile
Teletica	Costa Rica
Canal 6	El Salvador
Azteca Honduras	Honduras
Canal 11	Honduras
Canal 2	Israel
Sky TG24	Italy
TVN	Panama
Latina Televisión	Peru
WAPA-TV	Puerto Rico
Canal 4	Uruguay
Venevisión	Venezuela

=== Suspended ===
Channel	Country	Cause
NTV	Russia	Suspended due to the Russian invasion of Ukraine.

== Business model ==
All ENEX members pay a yearly membership fee – the amount depends on the size of the channel, the size of its market, its contribution to the ENEX content pool, and the use of satellite time. Each member submits material from their own-produced news programmes to the ENEX content pool without receiving any financial compensation. In return, they can use material from this pool for their programmes, free of charge.

== Live operations ==
ENEX organises live stand-up coverage of major planned and breaking news events on behalf of partners. The Greek financial crisis of summer 2015 saw ENEX deploying satellite trucks to Athens but also to each of the long-running string of governmental meetings in Brussels, Strasbourg, and Luxembourg City such as Eurogroup, Ecofin and full council.

The Germanwings plane crash saw ENEX have live camera positions in Seyne Les Alpes, France, Dusseldorf Airport and Haltern Am See in Germany. Over the course of the Charlie Hebdo shooting, ENEX used three SNGs to provide positions in five locations, including the magazine's offices on the first day and the Paris supermarket for the final hostage-freeing.

Pre-planned events have included the British royal wedding of the Duke and Duchess of Cambridge, the birth of their children and the election of Pope Francis in 2013.
