= SOMOS Distribution =

SOMOS Distribution, LLC
- Headquarters: Miami, Florida

Programming
- Language: Spanish

Ownership
- Owner: SOMOS Group

History
- Launched: September 2009

Links
- Website: www.somosdistribution.net

SOMOS Distribution, LLC, is a global audiovisual content distribution company serving broadcasters and Internet delivery services worldwide. The company is headquartered in Miami, Florida with offices in Spain and Chile. According to TTV Media News, Somos Distribution has sales associates in each of the major regions of the Western Hemisphere and in Europe. The company is part of Somos Group and headed by Luis Villanueva.

== History ==
Somos Distribution was founded in 2009 by Luis Villanueva and it is part of SOMOS Group (together with SomosTV, SOMOS Productions, SOMOS Next, SOMOS Films) and SOMOS Fast. The company represents more than 10,000 hours of programming from around the world including various major European, Turkish, Latin American and Asian broadcasters and content producers. The company features popular Turkish dramas, telenovelas, biopics and television series from Latin America, Spain and Asia. The firm's catalogue includes movies (feature films) from distributors of independent films, series such as "Hasta Que Te Conocí", "Súbete a Mi Moto", @Gina Yei: WithAllMyHeartAndMore and sports like Mixed Martial Arts (MMA) . In addition it licenses and sells telenovela scripts and concepts as television format from rights holders from Latin America, Turkey and Asia.

Somos Distribution distributes content in all windows: Free TV (Terrestrial television), Pay TV, Video on Demand, Pay-Per-View, mobile television and Internet television.

Recently the company licensed its youth series "Lucy es el 7" to HBO Max in Latin America.

== Distribution and content ==
Somos Distribution distributes various types of programming including dramas, movies, television formats, programs (such as episodic series), telenovelas, variety shows, documentaries, sports and news, among others. The content is produced by related companies such as SOMOS Productions as well as produced by in-house production organizations as well as by European and American companies.

Somos Distribution represents the following companies: Corporació Catalana de Mitjans Audiovisuals., 2B/Enchufe.tv., Antena Group, SA / TV3 Catalunya, Novocomedy, and People Guiding Media. In the year 2020 started to distribute RCTV International content catalog.

== See also ==
- SOMOSTV
- SOMOS Films
- FlixLatino
