= SOMOS Films =

American film production company

- Industry: Entertainment
- Founded: 2018
- Headquarters: Miami, Florida
- Key people: Luis Villanueva
- Parent: SOMOS Group
- Website: somosfilms.com

SOMOS Films LLC is a Miami based company that produces feature films in Spanish for theatrical wide release, television, internet and other distribution means. SOMOS Films is part of the SOMOS Group(SOMOSTV, SOMOS Productions, SOMOS Distribution, SOMOS Next, SOMOS Fast, and SOMOS Films). SOMOS Films produces its own projects and participates in co-production with international partnering companies. In its coproduction projects the company works with local talent at creative, technical and artistic levels.

== History ==
In 2018, Somos Films produced its first film Muerte en Berruecos, a movie about the assassination of South America's independence hero Antonio Jose de Sucre, together with Digivision Producciones, premiered in Venezuela in the month of April. Muerte en Berruecos was nominated to the Goya Awards for Best Ibero-American Film at the 35th edition. In 2019, The company produced Voy Por Ti, which depicts bullying in schools, co-produced with Cnac, Xenon Films and Zona Filmica, which premiered at the Miami International Film Festival. and winner of Special Jury Award at the Festival del Cinema Latino Americano di Trieste.

The company completed the production of Especial (starred by Ruper Vásquez and Greyber Rengifo), a story about a child with Down syndrome, in co-production with El Dorado Films and Divarte Cine and El Paraiso de La Serpiente, with Biznaga Films, Cine Provincia, Bibi Film and La Maroma Producciones (Mexico). Both films are participated in international film festivals. Especial won the award "Best Fiction Film" at The Venezuelan Film Festival in July, 2021. and also the Silver Hugo award in the New Directors category in the Chicago International Film Festival.

In 2021, SOMOS Films finished the production of Hotel Providencia, filmed in Margarita Island, together with 58 Films, Sghettisawz and Digivisión Producciones, as well as the Venezuelan production with Divarte Producciones Un Cupido sin puntería (starred by Luis Geronimo Abreu and Claudia La Gatta) and "One Way" (filmed in Caracas), with Rodando Films C.A. The company also produced "El Quinceanero de mi abuela" (starred by Mónica Pastrana, Johanna Rosaly, Linette Torres and Jorge Luis Ramos) y "Al Reves" (with Angelique Burgos and Obie Bermúdez) en la isla de Puerto Rico in co-production with Pinolywood Studios. SOMOS Films and Rodando Films finished the comedy "Amor en el Aire" in Colombia and the company finished in 2023 the film "Julia tiene Sugar" with Divarte Films, directed by Jose Antonio Varela.

More recently, in 2024, SOMOS Films and Rodando Films produced the comedy "Tres Dias para Reconquistarla" in Colombia. The comedy was directed by Carlos Daniel Malave and starred by Guillermo García (Alberto), Carolina Piedrahita (Clara), Gabriela Mezone (Julia) and Andres Castaneda (G y C)

== Productions ==
Year	Títle	Film Director	Genre
2018	Muerte en Berruecos	Caupolican Ovalles	History, Thriller
2018	El paraíso de la serpiente	Bernardo Arellano	Fiction
2019	Voy por ti	Carmen La Roche	Drama
2019	Especial	Ignacio Márquez	Drama
2021	Al revés	Eduardo Ortiz	Comedy
2021	Hotel Providencia	Caupolican Ovalles	Thriller
2021	Un Cupido sin puntería	José Antonio Varela	Comedy
2021	Quinceañero de mi abuela	Eduardo Ortíz	Comedy
2021	One Way	Carlos Malavé	Drama
2022	Amor en el Aire	Carlos Malavé	Comedy
2022	Angels Inc	José María Pumarino	Drama
2022	La Chica del Alquiler	Carlos Caridad Montero	Comedy
2022	Un Retiro para Enamorarse	Jesus Alvarez Betancourt	Comedy
2023	Julia Tiene Sugar	Jose Antonio Varela	Comedy
2024	Tres Dias para Reconquistarla	Carlos Daniel Malave	Comedy
