= Caupolicán Ovalles =

Caupolicán Ovalles may refer to:

- Caupolicán Ovalles (writer)
- Caupolicán Ovalles (filmmaker)
