= Sábado Chiquito =

TV dominican program for kids

- Also known as: Sábado Chiquito de Corporán
- Genre: Variety show
- Created by: Rafael Corporán
- Presented by: Rafael Corporán
- Theme music composer: Alfio Lora
- Country of origin: Dominican Republic

Production
- Executive producers: Angel Puello, Edilenia Tactuk, Carlen Espinal, Dio Lluberes, Elizabeth Crespo, Geisha Rivas, Emma Caro, Katty Cocco, Sheila Cotes, Giordano Landron, Eugenio Ricardo
- Producer: Carlos Reyes
- Production company: Color Visión

Original release
- Release: 1990 – 2011

Sabado Chiquito, or Sabado Chiquito de Corporan (Sábado Chiquito de Corporán in Spanish) is a children's variety show in the Dominican Republic between 1988 and 2011, for children from the ages of 6 to 12. It was a division of Sabado de Corporan, a show dedicated to adults which included an entire morning segment on the Color Visión network. The shows were produced and headed by the same company; both studios were located in Santo Domingo.

== Overview ==
The show was aired in front of a live studio audience which participated in competitions and sketches throughout the show. Originally a segment of Sabado de Corporan in 1990, it became a weekly morning show in 1991.

It included informative segments, dancing, singing, sketches, and contests. The show has been often ridiculed because of its campy and childish style.

The show, targeted to child audiences, might also appealed to preteen audiences and some teenagers. It changes hosts and cast members as they mature or decide to leave. Paloma Rodriguez was an example of this, having left the show after deciding to focus more on school than on acting.

Cast members include hostess Isabel Aracena (known as Isha), Linda García, Mabel Martínez, Zeny Leyva Scarlet Mejia, and correspondent Paloma Rodriguez, a Santo Domingo socialite who currently attends 11th Grade in Santo Domingo, Dominican Republic.

Numerous hosts and communications professionals were mentored on this show, such as Chiquii Hadad, Edilenia Tactuck, Angel Puello, Sheyla Cotes, Giordano Landrón, and Wendy Th.

Due to financial issues during its latest season, Sabado Chiquito was cancelled in June 2011.

== Producers ==
- Angel Puello
- Edilenia Tactuk
- Carlen Espinal
- Dio Lluberes
- Elizabeth Crespo
- Carlos Reyes
- Geisha Rivas
- Emma Caro
- Katty Cocco
- Sheila Cotes
- Giordano Landron
- Eugenio Ricardo
