= SOMOS Next =

American Spanish-language media company

- Type: Private (limited liability company)
- Industry: Streaming media
- Headquarters: Miami, Florida, United States
- Area served: United States (main 50 states) and Puerto Rico (FlixLatino); Mexico (Pingüinitos)
- Key people: Luis Villanueva (CEO); Luis Guillermo Villanueva (COO)
- Products: FlixLatino, Pingüinitos
- Parent: SOMOS Group
- Website: www.somosnext.net

SOMOS Next, LLC is an American digital media entertainment company based in Miami, Florida, that distributes Spanish-language films, series, and children's programming. It owns FlixLatino, a streaming service (subscription video-on-demand) for Hispanic audiences in the United States and Puerto Rico that launched in 2015, and Pingüinitos, a brand of Spanish-language animation for young children. SOMOS Next, which also distributes its content in online platforms (Amazon and others), began as a subsidiary of SomosTV and is part of SOMOS Group, a group of Miami-based entertainment companies.

== History ==
SOMOS Next introduced FlixLatino in February 2015 as the brand for the distribution of a catalog of more than 400 Spanish-language films that had been released theatrically in Latin America and Spain. The catalog was initially offered through DirecTV's Yaveo platform and as rentals on a YouTube channel. The launch on DirecTV was announced in February of that year. Luis Guillermo Villanueva led the initiative and day-to-day operations as the chief operating officer.

By October 2015, the company was also running Pingüinitos, a YouTube channel of short animated series in neutral Spanish for children up to five years old. In March 2016, it relaunched Pingüinitos as a brand for internet and over-the-top (OTT) distribution.

In February 2017, FlixLatino, then known as FlixLatino Go, expanded from a subscription channel on YouTube to a standalone service on its own website, iOS and Android apps, and Roku. In June 2017, SOMOS Next was grouped with SOMOSTV, SOMOS Productions, SOMOS Distribution, SOMOS Fast and SOMOS Films under a new umbrella, SOMOS Group.

FlixLatino became available to Sprint customers in April 2018, as an à la carte channel on Sling TV in May 2019, and on Amazon Prime Video Channels in February 2020.

In February 2021, FlixLatino added two linear channels to its subscription: FlixLatino Live, for adults, and Flix Kids, inside the service's children's section. In October 2021, it launched on Comcast's Xfinity X1 and Xfinity Flex platforms. The service was added to Google TV in December 2022, and to Verizon's +play subscription platform in March 2023. In February 2023, Pingüinitos launched in Mexico as a channel on Prime Video Channels.

FlixLatino marked its tenth anniversary in February 2025. In December 2025, it announced distribution agreements with The Roku Channel, Vizio, and Claro Puerto Rico, and added free ad-supported (FAST) channels alongside its subscription tiers.

== Services ==
FlixLatino carries films, series, documentaries, and children's animation originally produced in Spanish, mainly from Latin America and Spain, with English subtitles on most titles. It is available in the United States and Puerto Rico.

Pingüinitos is a catalog of non-violent animated programming in neutral Spanish for toddlers and preschoolers, distributed online and, in Mexico, through Prime Video Channels.
