= Color Visión =

Dominican television network

- Type: Free-to-air commercial television network
- Country: Dominican Republic
- Headquarters: Santo Domingo, Dominican Republic

Programming
- Language: Spanish
- Picture format: 1080i HDTV (downscaled to 480i for the SDTV feed)

Ownership
- Owner: Bermúdez family
- Key people: Domingo Bermúdez (owner); Angel Laureano (director)

History
- Founded: 25 July 1968; 58 years ago
- Launched: 30 November 1969; 56 years ago
- Founder: José Armando Múdez; Manolo Quiroz

Links
- Website: colorvision.com.do (in Spanish)

Availability

Terrestrial
- Analog VHF: Channel 9
- Digital VHF: Channel 9.1

Color Visión is a television network based in the Dominican Republic. It is one of the largest television channels in that country. Color Visión is channel 9 in the Dominican Republic's television dial.

== History ==
Color Visión was founded on July 25, 1968 as the first color television station in the Dominican Republic and the third such company in Latin America as a whole and began regularly scheduled programming on November 30, 1969, in the city of Santiago de los Caballeros. The first transmissions were from the Matum hotel, in Santiago.

In 1970, Color Visión moved its daily transmissions to Santo Domingo. There, Color Visión used the famous Hotel Jaragua's areas as television sets. One of the first show hosts was Manolo Quiroz.

Later on, Dominican businessman Poppy Bermudez put a large amount of money into helping Color Visión open its own studio.

The 1970s were times of growth for the company, as many locally produced programs were shown, and people such as Jack Veneno found work at the station, and a niche among Dominican television viewers.

During the 1980s, Color Visión contracted such stars as Freddy Beras-Goico (cousin of Charytín Goico) and Miledys Cabral.

For the next twenty years, the channel continued growing nationally. Color Visión became the first Dominican channel to have live internet telecasts, and, in 2003, it began to air its programs in the United States, through the DirecTV system, on NDTV, operated by the US company Nexus International Broadcasting. Color Visión's programming made up the bulk of its output.

In 2019, the year of its fiftieth anniversary, the channel premiered Dominica's Got Talent, based on the Got Talent international franchise. The network was also conducting technological improvements in its four studios, had the arrival of Jochy Santos and an output deal with Sony Pictures Entertainment.

An agreement with NBCUniversal was reached in December 2024, enabling the network to air content from its catalog from January 2025, especially Telemundo's telenovelas. It also announced that it would start broadcasting in 4K in 2025. On March 8, 2025, the channel started broadcasting in the new format, the first in the country to do so.

== Programs ==
Color Visión offers variety and news shows, as well as telenovelas, among other types of programming. As of 2023, its telenovelas were sourced from Turkey and the Philippines, as well as titles from Caracol Televisión.

Monday to Friday

- Hoy Mismo (2000–present)
- El Despertador (2014–present)
- Hablando De Salud (20??-20??)
- ENTRANDO POR LA COCINA (2007–2012)
- El Show Del Mediodia (1977–Present)
- Mundo Vision (1969–2014)
- Noticias SIN (2014–present)
- Con Los Famosos (1998–Present)
- Noti Espetaculos (2005–2011)
- ACERCATE A LOS ASTROS (2005–2012)
- La Super Revista (1990–2014)
- Piedra, Papel & Tijera (2001–2011)
- Happy Team (2009-2014)
- Con Freddy Y Punto (2003–2010)
- Perdone La Hora (2000–2012)
- Te Estan Facturando (1993–20??)
- Sigue la noche (2011–present)

Saturdays

- LA POLICIA T.V (2004–Present)
- Sentido Comun (19??-Present)
- Sabado Chiquito (1989–2011)
- Sabado De Corporan (1988–2012)
- La Vida Misma (2000–Present)
- Nuria (1987–Present)
- De La Semana (2004–Present)
- Encuentro (2008–Present)
- Gerardo De Fiesta (2009–Present)

Sundays

- El Mundo De La Fauna
- Entrevista Mundo Vision (19??-20??)
- Punto De Vista
- Lucha Libre Internacional (1970s-20??)
- Lideres (2003–Present)
- Aeromundo (1967–Present)
- 9 X 9 Roberto (1999–2010)
- Formula One Racing (2009–Present)
- Fashion TV (19??-Presente)
- Sabrina De Fin De Semana (1990–Present)
- Estaciones Sociales (2002–Present)
- Con Jatnna (2000–Present)
- Mi Pueblo Por Dentro (2008–Present)
- Foro Legislativo
- Diario Del Domingo (2006–Present)
