= TV Azteca Honduras =

Honduras television network

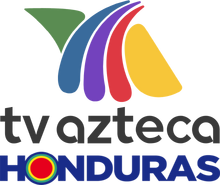
- Country: Honduras
- Broadcast area: Honduras
- Headquarters: Tegucigalpa

Programming
- Picture format: 16:9 480i SDTV

Ownership
- Owner: TV Azteca Honduras, S.A. (TV Azteca)
- Key people: Benjamín Salinas Sada (vice-president of Televisión Azteca)

History
- Launched: September 1, 2013

Links
- Website: www.tvazteca.com/honduras/

Availability

Terrestrial
- Analog UHF: Channel 60

TV Azteca Honduras is a Mexican-owned Honduran broadcast television channel owned by TV Azteca.

== History ==
On September 5, 2013, CONATEL (Comisión Nacional de Telecomunicaciones: i.e.: National Telecommunications Commission) put television channel 60 and other channels up for sale, several of them with local coverage and one with full coverage. TV Azteca offered 61 million lempiras for the acquisition of the 60 UHF signal and would be awarded a 15-year concession.

== See also ==
- Azteca América
- TV Azteca Guate
- TV Azteca
