= Sid the Science Kid =

American animated children's television series

- Also known as: Jim Henson's Sid the Science Kid
- Genre: Children's television series Education; Cartoon series
- Created by: The Jim Henson Company
- Written by: Bradley Zweig
- Voices of: Drew Massey; Julianne Buescher; Victor Yerrid; Alice Dinnean; Donna Kimball
- Theme music composer: Dena Diamond; Mike Himelstein
- Opening theme: "Sid the Science Kid"
- Ending theme: "Sid the Science Kid" (instrumental)
- Composers: Michael Turner; Mike Himelstein
- Country of origin: United States
- Original language: English
- No. of seasons: 2
- No. of episodes: 67 (list of episodes)

Production
- Executive producers: Brian Henson (season 1); Lisa Henson; Halle Stanford; Bradley Zweig
- Producer: Chris Plourde
- Running time: 30 minutes
- Production companies: KCET Los Angeles; The Jim Henson Company

Original release
- Network: PBS Kids
- Release: September 1, 2008 – March 25, 2013

Sid the Science Kid, also known as Jim Henson's Sid the Science Kid, is an American animated educational children's television series produced by The Jim Henson Company in association with PBS affiliate KCET, that aired on PBS Kids from September 1, 2008 to March 25, 2013. Created using digital puppetry, the series centers on Sid, a preschool-aged boy who loves science, as he and his friends at school learn about scientific topics through experiments and play.

Reruns of the show aired on PBS Kids Sprout until October 3, 2014. It was the last PBS show added to Sprout's lineup before NBCUniversal (via its acquisition by Comcast) took full ownership of the network in November 2013. Since the series' cancellation, reruns continued on the PBS Kids Channel until June 25, 2023.

A reboot is currently in the works at the Jim Henson Company, alongside Dinosaur Train.

== Premise ==
The series revolves around Sid, a young boy who uses comedy to tackle questions about basic scientific principles and why things work the way they do. He tries to answer questions and solve problems with the help of his classmates (May, Gerald, and Gabriela), his teacher Susie, and his family.

The show encourages children to think, talk and work the way scientists do by building on preschoolers' natural curiosity about the world.

== Characters ==
=== Main ===
- Sid (performed by Misty Rosas and voiced by Drew Massey) is a preschool-aged boy who dreams of being a scientist when he grows up. Sid is the most practical character on the show and is often portrayed as a very supportive friend and leading scientist in his group. He ponders many questions every day while at his school, sometimes after thinking of them the night before. His special item is a toy microphone with four different colored buttons. When pressed, the blue button plays the recorded laughter of people, the yellow button plays the recorded applause, the red button makes a cow noise, and the white button records echoes. Sid's mother is of African-American descent and mainly does research as noted in every episode and his father grew up Jewish as noted in the Hanukkah/Christmas/Kwanzaa episode.
- May (performed by Dana Michael Woods and voiced by Julianne Buescher) is one of Sid's best friends; she is known for her friendliness and politeness, and is considerably smarter than her other three friends. She is of Chinese descent and has a cat named Mushu. May wears glasses due to nearsightedness, which is proven in the episode "Grandma's Glasses" when she has trouble seeing the eye chart. She is the friendliest of the four, characterized by her charm and courtesy.
- Gerald (performed by Alon Williams and voiced by Victor Yerrid) is one of Sid's best friends. Although often a straggler at the start of Rug Time, he is very enthusiastic, rambunctious, imaginative, and known for his creative entrances into the school, during which he often pretends to be something other than himself. He is perhaps the most vivid character of the group, often being the life and soul of activities. When Sid usually arrives at school, he always wants to show off his cool dance moves. A running gag is that he is always trying to be funny, but almost never succeeds. He also has a dog named Chester.
- Gabriela Córdova (performed by John Munro Cameron and voiced by Alice Dinnean) is one of Sid's best friends. Unlike her friends, Gabriela is the most sensible character and often comes up with the best jokes during Good Laughternoon. She is Hispanic, has an older brother named Mateo, and is the most authoritative figure of the quartet, often being second-in-command of the group activities. She likes playing Pretend, always opting to be a "mother" parent. She sometimes has playdates with Sid after school. She can speak in both English and Spanish.

=== Supporting ===
- Susie, called "Teacher Susie" by Sid before "Rug Time", (performed by Sonya Leslie and voiced by Donna Kimball), is the teacher at Sid's school. She begins the day with "Rug Time", where she calls her students over to sit in a circle and ask them if they have anything to share with the class. Usually, the theme that gets everyone's attention is what was discussed during "Sid's Survey", and what Sid was thinking about earlier in the day. She demonstrates the experiments with her class each school day, following Sid's main question theme during Super Fab Lab; she also sings a song about the episode's topic before she sends Sid and his friends home.
- Mort (performed by John Munro Cameron and voiced by Victor Yerrid) is Sid's father. He works in construction and often relates Sid's observations to his work experiences. In the holiday special, it is revealed that he has a sister named Irene who lives in Minnesota.
- Alice (performed by Sonya Leslie and voiced by Alice Dinnean) is Sid's mother. She is a website designer and children's computer game developer. She also frequently searches the web to help Sid find information about his questions before dropping him off for school.
- Zeke (performed by Alon Williams and voiced by Donna Kimball) is Sid's baby brother. He is almost a year old, does not know anything yet, and is mostly shown sitting at the kitchen table in a high chair.
- Rose (performed by Dana Woods and voiced by Julianne Buescher) is Sid's grandmother and Mort's mother. She likes to tell Sid stories about herself when she was younger while driving Sid home from school. She has a dog named Philbert.
- Dr. Rosalinda Córdova (performed by Michelan Sisti and voiced by America Ferrera) is a marine biologist and Gabriela's mother from Mexico. Her job is working at the Science Center that Sid and his friends often visit during some episodes of Season 2. She helps to explain the various exhibits at the center and how they relate to the school lessons Sid and his friends are having. She is fluent in both English and Spanish.
- Philbert (performed by Daisy the dog, voiced by Bruce Lanoil) is a purple Great Dane who is who was adopted by Grandma in the episode "Hello Doggie" and helps Sid in his investigation of animal communication. Philbert was also featured in several other episodes of the show, including "How Did My Dog Do That?" where he helps Sid learn about the different skeletal systems.

== Episodes ==
Season	Episodes	Originally released	
Season	Episodes	First released	Last released
1	41	September 1, 2008	October 26, 2009
2	26	June 21, 2010	November 15, 2012
Sid the Science Kid: The Movie		March 25, 2013	

=== Sid the Science Kid: The Movie (2013) ===
Sid the Science Kid: The Movie is an animated film premiered on PBS Kids on March 25, 2013. It featured the original voice cast of the series alongside special guest voice Christopher Lloyd as Dr. Bonanodon.

In the film, Sid and his friends enter a contest and win a trip to a new science museum in town. Sid and Gabriela win the contest and are allowed inside the museum before it officially opens to the public. Along the way, they meet some new friends; such as Yangyang, Niuniu, and BobbyBot. However, BobbyBot malfunctions, causing the museum to be in total chaos and havoc, putting the grand opening of the museum in jeopardy. It's up to Sid and his friends to save the museum before it opens up. This also serves as the series finale of Sid the Science Kid.

== Development ==
Development began in early 2007 under the original working title of "What's the Big Idea?" and with the title-character being originally named Josh. In the fall of 2007, the show was retitled "Sid the Science Kid", and the original Josh was renamed to Sid. In mid-November 2007, the title-character was altered and, by the end of the month, Gerald, May and Gabriella joined the series as main characters, bringing the total to four. In early December 2007, Susie joined the character list as the only adult, bringing the total to five. Production began in January 2008 with 40 half-hour episodes (in addition to a special) being ordered for the first season as a two-year on-air commitment.

The show is created using digital puppetry. Each character required two puppeteers working in concert, one performing the face and mouth using a remote manipulator or Waldo, and the other performing the body using motion capture.

On May 17, 2010, the series was renewed for a second season with 20 episodes (in addition to six specials) that premiered on June 21, 2010, with the "No School Sing-Along Special" and later aired the season's first episode on October 4, 2010.

=== Where Did I Come From? ===
Sid wants to know where he came from, and when he asked his parents about it, they tell him to walk through the wall so he can find out. Sid thinks his parents are going insane, but they prove him wrong once Mort shows him. Sid then walks through the wall and enters the real life studio filming the show, the crew explains Sid about digital puppetry. Sid goes back to his world and decides he doesn't want to go back to real life again. Afterwords, his parents erase his memory. Sid then asks his parents if he can go play with his friends. When they tell him yes, Sid nearly runs into the counter before leaving the kitchen.

== Reception ==
=== Critical response ===
Sid the Science Kid generally received positive reviews and currently has a four out of five stars from Common Sense Media.

Emily Ashby stated "It's so entertaining that parents might find themselves drawn to watch [the show] as well -- and those who do may well learn a few things, too."

== Broadcast ==
Sid the Science Kid aired on PBS Kids from September 1, 2008 to March 25, 2013, with reruns airing until June 25, 2023. Due to Sid the Science Kid's popularity, the show was broadcast in many channels like Discovery Kids (Latin America), CBeebies, Al Jazeera Media Network, and the American Forces Network.

=== Streaming ===
Sid the Science Kid is available to watch on Semillitas, Edye, and the official PBS Kids website.

== Merchandise and Live Show ==
The success of Sid the Science Kid has also generated multiple products like shirts, toys, DVDs, and a live show in 2014 called Sid the Science Kid Live: Let's Play!.

== Awards ==
"Save the Stump!" won in the Children's Programming category Saturday at the 26th Genesis Awards, presented by the Humane Society of the United States. Additionally, the series has received a total of six Daytime Emmy Award nominations and a TCA Award nomination.

== See also ==
- Bill Nye the Science Guy
