= SOMOSTV =

SOMOSTV LLC
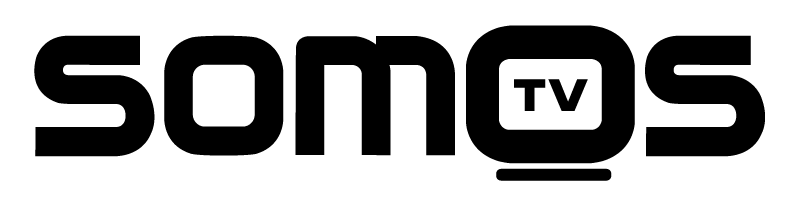
- Country: United States; Puerto Rico; Mexico; Panama; Dominican Republic; Honduras; Guatemala; Nicaragua; El Salvador
- Headquarters: Miami, Florida

Programming
- Language: Spanish

Ownership
- Owner: SOMOS Group

History
- Launched: September 2006

Links
- Website: www.somostv.com

Networks
- ViendoMovies Semillitas: .

SOMOSTV LLC, is an American Pay TV entertainment company engaged in the production, distribution, and marketing of Pay TV channels in the U.S. Hispanic market, Puerto Rico, Mexico, Panama, Central America, and the Caribbean. Headquartered in Miami, Florida, the company owns and operates two networks: ViendoMovies and Semillitas. SOMOSTV is headed by Luis Villanueva, an executive in the Hispanic media and entertainment industry, President and CEO of SOMOS Group.

== History ==
SOMOSTV started operations in 2006 with the launch of ViendoMovies, a 24-hour movie channel which features exclusive, theatrical wide release, commercial-free movies (feature film) produced in Spanish. SOMOSTV is part of SOMOS Group (together with SOMOS Distribution, Somos Productions, SOMOS Next, SOMOS Films) and SOMOS Fast. ViendoMovies, has distribution agreements with all major cable television, telcos, and satellite television distribution companies in the United States and Puerto Rico. ViendoMovies programing is a mix of feature film genres from Spain and Latin America, packaged with promotional material targeting the U.S. Hispanic Market including coverage of Film Festivals .In 2010, SomosTV expanded its services by launching its second channel, “Semillitas. “Semillitas” is an animation network oriented to Hispanic toddlers and pre-teens and preschool aged children with the objective to entertain and helping preserve the language and cultural heritage.^{[3].} From its initial launch in the United States and Puerto Rico, “Semillitas” expanded internationally, being distributed today in Central America, Mexico and the Caribbean.

== Television content ==
The company is considered an aggregator or bundler of licensed content but it often produces and edits content in-house.

SOMOSTV has developed, manages and distributes two television networks, “ViendoMovies” and “Semillitas".^{[12]} Luis Villanueva also oversees SOMOS Distribution LLC (an independent distributor of audiovisual programming worldwide), Somos Productions LLC (an independent programming producer) and SOMOS Films (production of feature films), together known as SOMOS Group. In 2014, Luis Villanueva added to SOMOS Group with SOMOS Next LLC, an Internet "OTT" (Over-the-top media service) content distributor, with a catalog of films under the brand FlixLatino (for the US and Puerto Rico) and children's animation under the brand "Pingüinitos" (for Mexico, Central America and The Caribbean). ^{[13]}. In 2023 SOMOS Group further expanded with the addition of SOMOS Fast, a company that produces Free ad-supported streaming television (Fast) channels (initially "Cine en Espanol" and "Cine de Horror", followed by a telenovela channel called "Novelas de Siempre").
