= List of Sid the Science Kid episodes =

This is a list of episodes of the TV series Sid the Science Kid. Sid the Science Kid aired a total of 67 half-hour episodes from September 1, 2008 until November 15, 2012.

On March 25, 2013, a film titled Sid the Science Kid: The Movie, premiered on PBS.

== Series overview ==
Season	Episodes	Originally released	
Season	Episodes	First released	Last released
1	41	September 1, 2008	October 26, 2009
2	26	June 21, 2010	November 15, 2012
Sid the Science Kid: The Movie		March 25, 2013	

== Episodes ==
=== Season 1 (2008–09) ===
No. overall	No. in season	Title	Directed by	Written by	Original release date	Prod. code
1	1	"The Sticker Chart"	Brian Henson	Craig Bartlett^{a}	September 1, 2008	101
When Sid is assigned a chore chart in order to get a "turbo robot mega-ship", he learns the purpose of charts. Subject: Charts Songs: Looking for My Friends (debut), Rug Time, Checking Out Charts Sid's Super Duper Ooper Shmooper Big Idea: The Whole-World Chart
2	2	"The Rolie Polie"	Hugh Martin	Jim Lewis	September 2, 2008	102
Sid introduces his rolie polies and learns about them while also learning about magnify glasses. Subject: Magnification Song: I Magnify Sid's Super Duper Ooper Shmooper Big Idea: The Magno-Hat
3	3	"Enough With the Seashells!"	Hugh Martin	Joe Purdy	September 3, 2008	103
When Sid has an estimation jar at school, he can't guess how many seashells there are and learns a new strategy to estimate. Subject: Estimation Song: My Best Guess Sid's Super Duper Ooper Shmooper Big Idea: The Gigantic Estimation Jar
4	4	"The Whale Episode"	Brian Henson	Eric Shaw	September 4, 2008	104
Sid learns how to use non-standard measurement to measure a huge whale. Subject: Measurement Song: A Pirate's Tale Sid's Super Duper Ooper Shmooper Big Idea: The Whale Ruler
5	5	"Super Science Tools"	Brian Henson and Hugh Martin	Craig Bartlett, Joe Purdy, Jim Lewis and Eric Shaw	September 5, 2008	105
Sid learns about science tools. Subject: Science Tools Sid's Super Duper Ooper Shmooper Big Idea: Same Idea as in "The Sticker Chart"
6	6	"My Mushy Banana"	Brian Henson	Bradley Zweig	September 8, 2008	106
Sid's banana turns brown and mushy and he wants to know why. Subject: Decay Song: It's Not Scary, It's Decayed Sid's Super Duper Ooper Shmooper Big Idea: The World's Biggest Banana Peel Slide
7	7	"My Shrinking Shoes"	Brian Henson	Jim Lewis	September 9, 2008	107
When Sid's feet can't fit into his favorite shoes, he thinks that his shoes are shrinking, until he learns that he's growing up. Subject: Growing Song: You Look Different Sid's Super Duper Ooper Shmooper Big Idea: Super-Duper Stretchy Growing Shoes
8	8	"My Ice Pops!"	Hugh Martin	Eric Shaw	September 10, 2008	108
Sid finds out that his frozen ice pop melted during the night and learns about the transformation of matter stages between liquid and solids. Subject: Transformations caused by Cold Song: On Penguin Pond Sid's Super Duper Ooper Shmooper Big Idea: The Biggest Juice Pop in the World
9	9	"The Perfect Pancake"	Brian Henson	Corey Powell	September 11, 2008	109
Sid learns about the changes of heat when his grandma teaches him how to cook pancakes. Subject: Transformations caused be Heat Song: Cooking Is Chemistry Sid's Super Duper Ooper Shmooper Big Idea: A Giant Frying Pan Chocolate Pool
10	10	"No More Changes!"	Brian Henson; Hugh Martin	Bradley Zweig, Jim Lewis, Eric Shaw and Corey Powell	September 12, 2008	110
Sid gets mad because of every change in his house. Subject: How Things Change Sid's Super Duper Ooper Shmooper Big Idea: Same Idea as in "My Shrinking Shoes"
11	11	"The Itchy Tag"	Hugh Martin	Corey Powell	September 22, 2008	111
When Sid has an itchy tag in his shirt, he learns about different textures. Subject: The Sense - Touch Song: Feeling The World On My Belly, It Feels Good To Be A Snake or The Snake Song Sid's Super Duper Ooper Shmooper Big Idea: Super Soft Wrap
12	12	"What's That Smell?"	Brian Henson	Joe Purdy	September 23, 2008	112
Sid learns about the sense of smelling. Subject: The Sense - Smell Song: "Detective Story" Sid's Super Duper Ooper Shmooper Big Idea: The Smellinator Machine
13	13	"Grandma's Glasses"	Allan Trautman	Will Shepard	September 24, 2008	113
Sid knows why his grandmother has to wear glasses, but learns why when he puts on the glasses, it looks distorted and blurry. Subject: The Sense - Sight Song: Do The Look Around Sid's Super Duper Ooper Shmooper Big Idea: Super Everything Glasses
14	14	"Too Much Noise!"	Hugh Martin	Elise Allen	September 25, 2008	114
Sid learns about sound when he hears three sounds at his house. Subject: The Sense - Hearing Song: Waves Of Sound Sid's Super Duper Ooper Shmooper Big Idea: Sound Wave Surfboard
15	15	"All My Senses"	Allan Trautman, Brian Henson and Hugh Martin	Corey Powell, Joe Purdy, Will Shepard, Elise Allen	September 26, 2008	115
Sid learns about all the human senses. Subject: The Five Senses Sid's Super Duper Ooper Shmooper Big Idea: Same Idea as in "What's That Smell?"
16	16	"A Brush With Teeth"	Hugh Martin	Joe Purdy	October 20, 2008	116
Sid learns about teeth and why he has to brush them. Subject: Teeth Song: What Happened To The Tooth? Sid's Super Duper Ooper Shmooper Big Idea: The Pop-In Pop-Out Teeth Changer
17	17	"I Want Cake"	Katy Garretson	Bradley Zweig	October 21, 2008	117
On Sid's birthday, Sid wonders why he can't eat cake everyday, but learns that eating nutritious foods is the key to being healthy. Subject: Nutrition Song: The Delicious Nutritious Band Sid's Super Duper Ooper Shmooper Big Idea: The Automatic Nutritious Meal Maker
18	18	"The Big Sneeze"	Hugh Martin	Craig Bartlett	October 22, 2008	118
Sid's father, Mort, has a cold and Sid learns that washing his hands will protect his hands from getting germs. Subject: Germs Song: Journey Of A Germ Sid's Super Duper Ooper Shmooper Big Idea: The Detecto-Sneeze
19	19	"Must See TV!"	Katy Garretson	Elise Allen	October 23, 2008	119
Sid wants to stay in bed and watch TV all weekend long until he learns that he must get some exercise everyday. Subject: Exercise Song: Work That Body Sid's Super Duper Ooper Shmooper Big Idea: The Keep-Moving Television
20	20	"Sid's Health Day"	Hugh Martin and Katy Garretson	Joe Purdy, Craig Bartlett, Bradley Zweig and Elise Allen	October 24, 2008	120
Sid and his friends learn several methods in order to stay healthy. Subject: Healthiness Sid's Super Duper Ooper Shmooper Big Idea: Same Idea as in "Must See TV!"
21	21	"The Broken Wheel"	Dean Gordon	Corey Powell	February 9, 2009	121
When one of Sid's toy truck wheels comes off, he learns about the functions of wheels and that just using tape to fix the toy truck doesn't make it functional. Subject: Wheels Song: A World Without Wheels Sid's Super Duper Ooper Shmooper Big Idea: Super Change-O Wheels
22	22	"My Slide"	Hugh Martin	Will Shepard	February 10, 2009	122
When Sid can't lift his stuffed dinosaur, Arnie, up on his bed for his pretend trip to the moon, he learns about inclined planes such as a slide and uses it to get Arnie up onto his bed. Subject: The Inclined Plane Song: Push It Up The Inclined Plane Sid's Super Duper Ooper Shmooper Big Idea: Giant Inclined Plane to make the World's Biggest Sandwich
23	23	"Sid's Amazing Invention!"	Dean Gordon	Keith Kaczorek	February 11, 2009	123
When Sid accidentally steps on a shovel and his toy lands in his box, he learns about levers and their purposes. Subject: Levers Song: Never Without My Levers Sid's Super Duper Ooper Shmooper Big Idea: Humungo-Lever
24	24	"The Tree House"	Hugh Martin	Joe Ansolabehere	February 12, 2009	124
Sid learns about pulleys and uses one to get all of his toys into his new tree house. Subject: Pulleys Song: Up To The Tree House Sid's Super Duper Ooper Shmooper Big Idea: Friend-O Pulley
25	25	"Climb, Ignatz, Climb!"	Dean Gordon and Hugh Martin	Joe Purdy, Keith Kaczorek, Corey Powell, Will Shepard and Joe Ansolabehere	February 13, 2009	125
Sid brings his stuffed panda, Ignatz Semmelweis, to school to make him climb a pretend mountain, so they use many basic machines to help him climb. Subject: Simple Machines Sid's Super Duper Ooper Shmooper Big Idea: Same Idea as in "My Slide"
26	26	"Hello Doggie!"	Hugh Martin	Craig Bartlett	February 16, 2009	126
Sid learns that animals communicate to each other in several styles and gets a dog after school. Subject: Animal Communication Song: Honey Bits Sid's Super Duper Ooper Shmooper Big Idea: Animal-Chat Hat
27	27	"Home Tweet Home"	Hugh Martin	Jim Lewis	February 17, 2009	127
Sid begins to wonder why no birds are living in his birdhouse he built with his dad. He soon learns that animals can create their own homes. Subject: Animal Homes Song: Lots of Little Things To Do Sid's Super Duper Ooper Shmooper Big Idea: Animal-Building Company
28	28	"The Dirt on Dirt"	Katy Garretson	Elise Allen	February 18, 2009	128
Sid learns that dirt can be useful, but it also contains germs. Subject: Soil Song: Dig This Town Sid's Super Duper Ooper Shmooper Big Idea: Super Soil-Recycler
29	29	"Don't Forget the Leaves!"	Hugh Martin	Bradley Zweig	February 19, 2009	129
Sid learns about leaves. Subject: Leaves Song: Bistro Le Leaf Sid's Super Duper Ooper Shmooper Big Idea: Jumbo Leaf-O Collector
30	30	"The Bug Club"	Hugh Martin; Katy Garretson	Joe Purdy; Bradley Zweig; Elise Allen; Jim Lewis	February 20, 2009	130
Sid and his friends create a club called "The Bug Club", and at school they have a special day where they observe insects. Subject: Animal Places Sid's Super Duper Ooper Shmooper Big Idea: Same Idea as in "Home Tweet Home"
31	31	"Sid's Rainy Play Date"	Katy Garretson	Craig Bartlett	May 4, 2009	131
When the rain ruins Sid's outdoor playdate with Gabriella, he learns how rain is good for us. Subject: Rain Song: The Little Rain Cloud Sid's Super Duper Ooper Shmooper Big Idea: The Unbelievable Umbrella
32	32	"Special Sunny Dad Day" "Sid's Special Dad Day"	David Gumpel	Michael Foulke	May 5, 2009	132
Sid is excited when he gets to play soccer with his dad after school, but dislikes sunblock. He soon learns about sunblock. Subject: Sun Song: Super Sun Sid's Super Duper Ooper Shmooper Big Idea: Super Sunblock Blaster
33	33	"Sid's Holiday Adventure"	David Gumpel	Corey Powell	September 16, 2009	133
Sid is excited for the holidays and learns that temperatures are different around the planet. Subject: Cold Temperatures Song: One Day In December Sid's Super Duper Ooper Shmooper Big Idea: The Winter Room
34	34	"The Wind Did It!"	Hugh Martin	Bradley Zweig	September 17, 2009	134
Sid discovers that the pile of leaves he raked up before is gone. He and his friends learn about wind. Subject: Wind Song: I Am The Wind Sid's Super Duper Ooper Shmooper Big Idea: The Wonder Wind-Tool
35	35	"Sid the Weatherman"	Katy Garretson; David Gumpel; Hugh Martin	Joe Purdy; Craig Bartlett; Bradley Zweig; Corey Powell	September 18, 2009	135
Sid and his friends learn about being a weathermen. Subject: Weather Sid's Super Duper Ooper Shmooper Big Idea: Same Idea as in "Sid's Holiday Adventure"
36	36	"Special Mom Day Meal"	Hugh Martin	Joe Purdy; Craig Bartlett	May 6, 2009	136
Sid claims that it's a special day called "Mom Day", and he smells cooking French toast and his stomach growls. He then learns that it's a signal for getting ready to process food. Subject: The Digestive System Song: Break It Down Sid's Super Duper Ooper Shmooper Big Idea: Super Stomach Symphony
37	37	"I Have Muscles Where?" "Muscle Boy Sid"	Allen Trautman	Elise Allen	May 7, 2009	137
Sid's father tells him a joke, and Sid laughs so hard that his face begins to feel injury. He learns that there are muscles in every part of the body. Subject: The Muscular System Song: Moving Muscles Sid's Super Duper Ooper Shmooper Big Idea: Muscles in A Box
38	38	"Sid's Amazing Lungs"	Hugh Martin	Sascha Paladino	May 8, 2009	138
When Sid runs around his room, he pants quickly. He then learns that oxygen goes into the lungs. Subject: The Respiratory System Song: Breathe In, Breathe Out Sid's Super Duper Ooper Shmooper Big Idea: The Exhale Whale Waterpark
39	39	"How Did My Dog Do That?"	Katy Garretson	Bradley Zweig	September 14, 2009	139
When Sid's dog, Philbert, does an action that Sid can't perform, Sid learns about the differences between the movements and bodies of various animals. Subject: The Skeletal System Song: The Skeleton I Got Sid's Super Duper Ooper Shmooper Big Idea: The Super-Bone Bot
40	40	"Now That's Using Your Brain!"	Hugh Martin; Allen Trautman; Katy Garretson (uncredited)	Bradley Zweig; Elise Allen; Craig Bartlett; Joe Purdy; Sascha Paladino	September 15, 2009	140
Sid learns about the brain. Subject: The Human Body Sid's Super Duper Ooper Shmooper Big Idea: Same Idea as in "I Have Muscles Where?"
41	41	"Getting a Shot: You Can Do It!"	Brian Henson	Bradley Zweig	October 26, 2009	141
Sid gets a flu shot. Note: This marked the first special episode of the show.

=== Season 2 (2010–12) ===
No. overall	No. in season	Title	Directed by	Written by	Original release date	Prod. code
42	1	"No School Sing-Along Special!"	Brian Henson	Bradley Zweig	June 21, 2010	201
Sid and his friends perform their favorite songs in front of their parents and Susie in Sid's backyard on their day off from school.
43	2	"Slide to the Side"	Hugh Martin	Bradley Zweig	October 4, 2010	202
Sid invents a new dance called "Slide to the Side", and learns about friction. Subject: Friction Song: Grip the Road! Sid's Super Duper Ooper Shmooper Big Idea: Friction Flip-Flops
44	3	"That's the Way the Ball Bounces"	Kirk Thatcher	Elise Allen	October 5, 2010	203
Sid learns about elasticity. Subject: Elasticity Song: Bounce It, Baby! Sid's Super Duper Ooper Shmooper Big Idea: Super Springy Shoes
45	4	"Ignatz's Inertia"	Hugh Martin	Joe Purdy	October 6, 2010	204
When Ignatz goes through inertia, Sid learns about it. Subject: Inertia Song: Skateboard Inertia! Sid's Super Duper Ooper Shmooper Big Idea: The Everywhere Belt
46	5	"Sid's Super Kick"	Hugh Martin	Bradley Zweig	October 7, 2010	205
Sid and his friends learn about force. Subject: Force Song: Game Time! Sid's Super Duper Ooper Shmooper Big Idea: The Fun-Force Rocket Ride
47	6	"Where Did the Water Go?"	Katy Garretson	Joe Purdy	April 18, 2011	206
Sid learns where all the water goes in the sink and learns to not waste water. Subject: Water Song: The Water Song Sid's Super Duper Ooper Shmooper Big Idea: The Super Duper Fresh Water Machine
48	7	"Clean Air!"	Hugh Martin	Corey Powell	April 19, 2011	207
Sid learns about air pollution and makes an effort to keep air clean. Subject: Clean Air Song: Beautiful Trees Sid's Super Duper Ooper Shmooper Big Idea: The Instant Tree-A-Go-Grow
49	8	"Reused Robot!"	Katy Garretson	Bradley Zweig	April 20, 2011	208
When Sid nearly throws one of his favorite toys away, Flip, he learns about trash and recycling. Subject: Recycling Song: Jelly Jar Blues Sid's Super Duper Ooper Shmooper Big Idea: The Trash Troop Building Company
50	9	"Save the Stump!"	Greg Fera	Bradley Zweig	April 21, 2011	209
When Sid is getting a basketball court in his backyard, he notices a stump with insects on it. He learns about animal habitats. Subject: Habitats Song: Get Into the Habit Sid's Super Duper Ooper Shmooper Big Idea: Sid Signal Animal Habitat Savers
51	10	"Let There Be Light"	Hugh Martin	Elise Allen	November 8, 2010	210
Sid learns about light. Subject: Light Song: Country Lights, City Lights Sid's Super Duper Ooper Shmooper Big Idea: The Amazing Bright Light Shirt
52	11	"Discovering Darkness"	Kirk Thatcher	Corey Powell	November 9, 2010	211
Sid learns about darkness. Subject: Darkness Song: In a World of Darkness Sid's Super Duper Ooper Shmooper Big Idea: Flash-Dark
53	12	"Shadow Smile!"	Katy Garretson	Bradley Zweig	November 10, 2010	212
Sid learns about shadows. Subject: Shadows Song: Cool in the Shade Sid's Super Duper Ooper Shmooper Big Idea: The Shadow-Switch Place
54	13	"A Rainbow Every Day!"	Katy Garretson	Jim Lewis	November 11, 2010	213
After a storm, Sid notices a rainbow and learns about them. Subject: Rainbows Song: The Colors of the Rainbow Sid's Super Duper Ooper Shmooper Big Idea: The Super Jumbo Power Prism
55	14	"Sid's Backyard Campout"	Brian Henson	Bradley Zweig	June 20, 2011	214
Gerald, Sid, and Mort go camping in Sid's backyard, and they learn about camping.
56	15	"Rock & Roll Easter "	Hugh Martin	Jim Lewis	April 3, 2011	215
Sid hunts all the Easter Eggs in the backyard but comes across a big rock. At school, Sid and his friends investigate the rock. Subject: Rocks Song: I'm A Rocker; This is A Rock Song Sid's Super Duper Ooper Shmooper Big Idea: The Insta-Rock Museum
57	16	"I Want to Be a Scientist!"	Katy Garretson	Bradley Zweig	December 5, 2011	216
Sid learns about different types of scientists. Song: Ology Means the Study Of
58	17	"Get Up and Move!"	Hugh Martin	Joe Purdy	January 6, 2012	217
Susie targets several healthy surprises at school. Song: Take A Walk, Take A Walk Sid's Super Duper Ooper Shmooper Big Idea: The Walking Wonder
59	18	"Halloween Spooky Science Special!"	Kirk Thatcher	Bradley Zweig	October 17, 2011	218
Sid and his friends dress up for Halloween, and they learn that the spooky holiday is scientific as well. Song: What's So Scary about Me? Sid's Super Duper Ooper Shmooper Big Idea: The Not-So-Scary Haunted House
60	19	"Sid's Pet Project"	Joe Purdy	Hugh Martin	November 12, 2012	219
Sid is tasked with taking care of his grandma's dog for a weekend, and he learns about taking care of pets. Subject: Taking Care of Animals Song: Love Your Pet Sid's Super Duper Ooper Shmooper Big Idea: The Power Pet-Center
61	20	"Sleep? Who Needs It?!"	Katy Garretson	Jim Lewis	November 13, 2012	220
Sid has a plan to stay up all night, but learns about the importance of sleep. Subject: Sleep Song: We All Need Our Sleep Sid's Super Duper Ooper Shmooper Big Idea: The Insta-Bed
62	21	"Seed the Science Kid"	Katy Garretson	Sascha Paladino	November 14, 2012	221
When Sid finds seeds in his apple and oranges, he learns about seeds. Subject: Life Cycles Song: Tiny Turtle from Turtle Bay Sid's Super Duper Ooper Shmooper Big Idea: The Life Cycle Super Speedster Machine
63	22	"The Reason Sid's Sneezin'"	Kirk Thatcher	Joe Purdy	November 15, 2012	222
Sid learns about allergies. Subject: Allergies Song: Susie Sneeze the Allergy Detective Sid's Super Duper Ooper Shmooper Big Idea: The Super-Duper Allergy Vacuum Machine
64	23	"The Amazing Computer Science Tool!"	Katy Garretson	Jim Lewis	December 6, 2011	223
Sid's mother, Alice, volunteers to demonstrate how a computer works in school. Subject: Computers Song: Computers Sid's Super Duper Ooper Shmooper Big Idea: Teeny-Tiny Ring Computer
65	24	"The Big Cheese!"	Kirk Thatcher	Alice Dinnean	December 7, 2011	224
The episode begins with Sid and his Mom using the computer, where they find a funny picture and some text claiming that the Moon is made of green, glowing cheese. Sid is amazed and believes this information. Sid excitedly shares his newfound "fact" with his friends at school. His friends are also initially enthralled by the idea of a cheese moon. Subject: Research Song: Put a Man on the Moon Sid's Super Duper Ooper Shmooper Big Idea: Team Super Researcher
66	25	"Sid Wings It!"	Kirk Thatcher	Bradley Zweig	December 8, 2011	225
When Sid attempts to fly, he learns about flying. Subject: Flight Song: People Wanted to Fly Sid's Super Duper Ooper Shmooper Big Idea: Super-Duper Wing Pack
67	26	"Sid Engineers a Solution"	Hugh Martin	Adam Rudman	December 9, 2011	226
Sid tries to get his cereal box, but he can't reach it. At school, he and his friends try to get a ball down from a tree. Subject: Engineering Song: Need an Engineer Sid's Super Duper Ooper Shmooper Big Idea: Octo-Grabber Note: This is the last regular-length episode.

== Film (2013) ==
Sid the Science Kid: The Movie premiered on March 25, 2013 on PBS, and it was released on DVD and iTunes on April 2, 2013.

Title	Directed by	Written by	DVD region	Original release date
"Sid the Science Kid: The Movie"	Kirk Thatcher	Bradley Zweig	Region 1	March 25, 2013 (PBS Kids); April 2, 2013 (DVD and iTunes)
Sid and Gabriella win a competition and take a field trip to a grand opening of a science museum in town and meet winners from China; Yang Yang and Niu Niu. All four of them meet a scientist, Dr. Bonanodon, but a robot malfunctions and Sid and Gabriela save the trip by reprogramming all of its settings.

== Notes ==
^a The information for the writer and the director are collected from the opening credits of each episode.
