= Death in Berruecos =

- Directed by: Caupolicán Ovalles
- Screenplay by: Édgar Narváez; Caupolicán Ovalles
- Starring: Luis Gerónimo Abreu
- Cinematography: Cezary Jaworski
- Music by: Waldemar D'Lima
- Distributed by: Cines Unidos
- Release date: 13 April 2018 (Venezuela)
- Running time: 145 minutes
- Country: Venezuela
- Language: Spanish

Death in Berruecos (Spanish: Muerte en Berruecos) is a 2018 Venezuelan police drama film created and directed by Caupolicán Ovalles. It is a Venezuelan co-production with Panama through the Ibermedia Program, the Centro Nacional Autónomo de Cinematografía, the Villa del Cine Foundation and SOMOS Films. It was filmed in different locations in countries such as Venezuela, Panama and Ecuador. The film is based on the murder of General Antonio José de Sucre, and revolves around the investigation of Captain Alejandro Godoy (Luis Gerónimo Abreu), who ten years after the murder of General Antonio José de Sucre, reopens the process of his death and finds that part of the previous file that has been destroyed. The film premiered in Venezuelan cinemas on 13 April 2018.

== Cast ==
- Luis Gerónimo Abreu as Alejandro Godoy
- Augusto Nitti as Antonio José de Sucre
- Ignacio Márquez as García Telles
- Gerardo Luongo as José María Obando
- Laureano Olivares as Apolinar Morillo
- José Roberto Díaz as Juan José Flores
- Rafael Gil
- Malena González
- Antonio Delli
- Rosalinda Serfaty as Remedios
- Claudia La Gatta as Marquesa de Solanda
- Manuel Salazar
- Alexandra Scull as Consuelo
- Vito Lonardo as Aguirre
