= Zee Mundo =

Television Channel

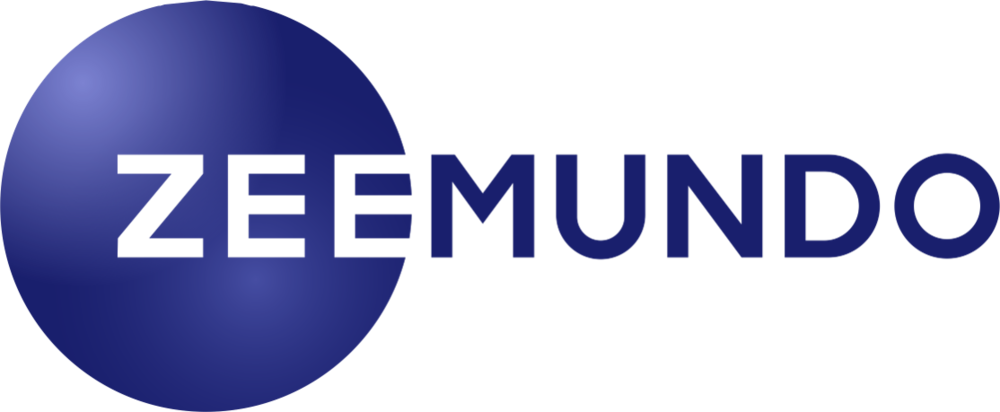
- Logo used since 2018
- Headquarters: Miami

Programming
- Language: Spanish
- Picture format: 1080p HDTV

Ownership
- Owner: Zee Entertainment Enterprises
- Parent: Zee Entertainment Enterprises

History
- Launched: 13 September 2016; 10 years ago

Links
- Website: zeemundo.com

Availability

Streaming media
- Sling TV: IPTV

Zee Mundo is a 24-hour Spanish-language Bollywood movie pay television channel. It is part of Zee Entertainment Enterprises.

Launched in September 2016, Zee Mundo brings HD Bollywood movies to Latino audiences, dubbed in Spanish.

As of 2021, Zee Mundo is available within the United States of America on Xumo and VEMOX, and has planned to expand to more US and Latin American affiliates and consumers.
