= ViendoMovies =

American pay television channel

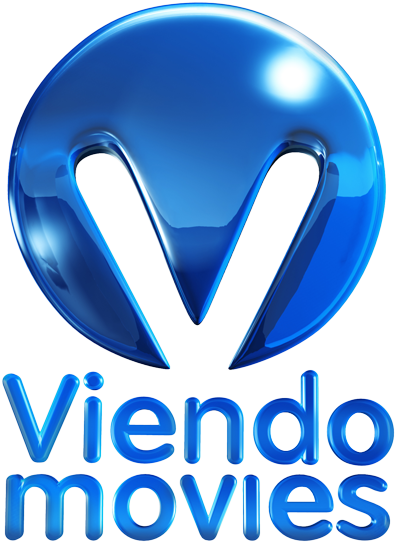
- Country: United States
- Broadcast area: United States and Puerto Rico
- Headquarters: Miami, Florida

Programming
- Language: Spanish
- Picture format: 1080i (HDTV)

Ownership
- Owner: SomosTV, LLC
- Sister channels: Semillitas

History
- Launched: September 6, 2006
- Former names: VeneMovies (2006–2011)

Links
- Website: ViendoMovies.com

ViendoMovies is an American Spanish-language pay television film channel, distributed in High Definition and available in cable television, Telcos and satellite television companies. The channel is owned by SomosTV, company headed by Luis Villanueva (President & CEO of SOMOS Group). ViendoMovies runs 24-hours a day featuring movies originally produced in Spanish in a commercial free format (without television advertisement). ViendoMovies' programming reaches subscribers in the United States and Puerto Rico.

== History ==
In 2006 SomosTV, a Pay TV entertainment company based in Miami, Fl announced the launch of ViendoMovies, then under the name VeneMovies. ViendoMovies was created based on the Hispanic market's affinity for Spanish language films. U.S. Hispanics are avid consumers of films. According to Hispanics Business Magazine, Hispanics eagerly attend film openings, accounting for over 17% of tickets sold, and watch more movies (DVDs, Blu-ray, and Digital Streaming) per year than any other segment of the U.S. population. On July 4, 2011, VeneMovies was renamed ViendoMovies.

== Current events ==
ViendoMovies is currently distributed by cable television, satellite television and streaming media companies such as Comcast Xfinity, Altice, Charter Spectrum, Astound Broadband, Verizon FiOS, Mediacom, Breezeline and Claro Puerto Rico, Innovative Cable U.S.(Viya) Virgin Islands and other cable companies. The channel announced in 2014 National Satellite Television Distribution.

== Programming ==
ViendoMovies offers a selection of theatrical wide release movies from Spain, Mexico, Colombia, Peru, Chile, Argentina, Venezuela, Puerto Rico, among others. The channel includes feature film genres such as action, drama, comedies, romance, etc. and include movies in a free VOD (Video on Demand) offering for its subscribers. The channel covers national and international film festivals where Spanish language movies participate. ViendoMovies includes close captioning in English and Spanish.

ViendoMovies is distributed as well by NCTC (National Cable Television Cooperative) for affiliated cable operators. NCTC is responsible for acquiring programming and hardware for almost 1000 affiliated companies that own and operate cable television systems in the U.S.
