= Corazón (TV channel) =

Spanish-language Mexican pay television channel

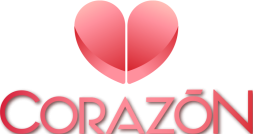
- Logo used from 2021 to 2023
- Country: Mexico
- Broadcast area: Latin America; United States

Programming
- Language: Spanish
- Picture format: 1080i HDTV (downscaled to 480i/576i for the SD feed)

Ownership
- Owner: TV Azteca Internacional TV de Paga (TV Azteca)
- Sister channels: Azteca Internacional; Cinema; Clic; Azteca Deportes Network

History
- Launched: July 1, 2008
- Former names: Azteca Novelas (2008–2014); Az Corazón (2014–2019)

Links
- Website: tvazteca.com/tvpaga/videos/corazon

Corazón (formerly Azteca Novelas and Az Corazón) is a Mexican pay television channel owned by TV Azteca Internacional TV de Paga (TV Azteca), was founded as Azteca Novelas in 2008, as a channel that would retransmit telenovelas previously broadcast on Azteca Uno.

== Availability ==
Corazón is available in Mexico under the providers Totalplay, Megacable and Star TV, Peru on Movistar TV, Chile on VTR, Brazil on Guigo TV, Guatemala, El Salvador, Nicaragua, Costa Rica and Panama on Claro TV, and in the United States under the FAST channels (Free ad-supported Streaming Television).
