= Noticias SIN =

Dominican news program

Noticias SIN is a Dominican news service broadcast by Color Visión (canal 9). It is one of the country's main sources for television news, with emphasis on national and international happenings. The name comes from the initials for Servicios Informativos Nacionales, and its work has focused on offering journalistic coverage with an investigative approach, analysis and monitoring of social, economic and political issues in the Dominican Republic.

The service is produced by Grupo SIN, a communication conglomerate founded by journalist Fernando Hasbún, and whose prominent figure is the renowned communicator Alicia Ortega.

== History ==
Noticias SIN emerged in 2005 as an independent news source, following the exit of Noticias Univisión's team from Canal 13. Its creation was led by Fernando Hasbún and Alicia Ortega, who founded Grupo SIN with the intention of offering more in-depth, investigative journalism focused on issues of social interest. The project found a slot on Color Visión's line-up, one of the most watched television channels in the country, thus allowing rapid penetration into the national audience. Until 2014, it aired on Antena Latina, where it remained until the channel's sale to Albavisión, causing it to move to Color Visión.

Since its inception, the news program was differentiated by the quality of its reports, the seriousness of its editorial line and its commitment to transparency and journalistic ethics. Programs such as El Informe con Alicia Ortega have received recognition for investigations that have exposed cases of corruption, abuse of power and institutional deficiencies. These investigations have had repercussions at the judicial level and have influenced the public agenda.
