= Cinema (Mexican TV channel) =

Spanish-language pay television channel

- Current logo since 2021
- Country: Mexico
- Broadcast area: Latin America; United States; Puerto Rico

Programming
- Language: Spanish
- Picture format: 1080i HDTV (downscaled to 480i/576i for the SD feed)

Ownership
- Owner: TV Azteca Internacional TV de Paga (TV Azteca)
- Sister channels: Azteca Internacional; Corazón; Clic; Azteca Deportes Network

History
- Launched: May 5, 2015
- Former names: Az Cinema (2015–2019)

Links
- Website: www.tvazteca.com/internacional/tv-de-paga/cinema-peliculas

Cinema (formerly: Az Cinema) is a Spanish-language pay television channel owned by TV Azteca Internacional TV de Paga (TV Azteca), the channel is specialized in transmitting films from the Mexican Golden Cinema, it competes mainly with the Televisa Networks' channel De Película.
