= Semillitas =

American pay TV network

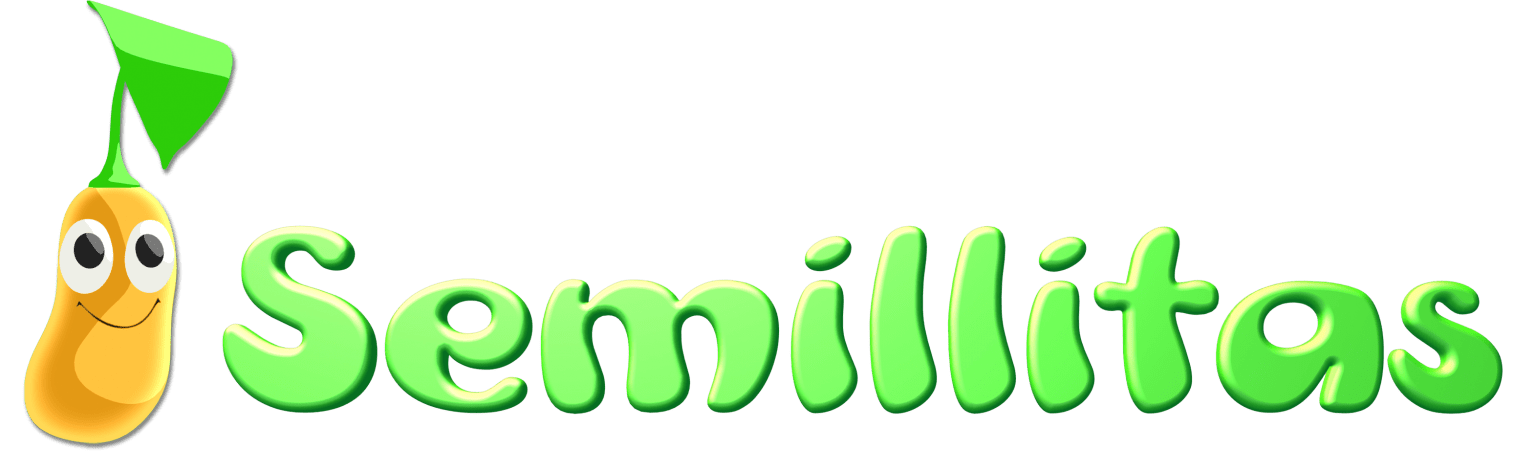
- Country: United States
- Broadcast area: United States, Puerto Rico, Dominican Republic, Panama, Mexico, Belize, Caribbean and Central America.
- Headquarters: Miami, Florida

Programming
- Language: Spanish
- Picture format: 1080i (HDTV) (standard-definition version downscaled by individual provider)

Ownership
- Owner: SomosTV
- Sister channels: ViendoMovies

History
- Launched: December 7, 2009

Links
- Website: www.semillitas.com

Semillitas is an American Spanish-language children’s pay television channel, owned by the media company SomosTV, headed by Luis Villanueva (President & CEO of SOMOS Group). The channel targets children 0–10 years of age with the objective of preserving Hispanic cultural roots and language through entertaining and violence-free programming, specifically animation and is distributed in a format without traditional television advertisement. Semillitas, produced in High Definition, programs animation in Spanish 24-hours a day, with closed captioning and video description, utilizing Standard Spanish dialogue.

== History ==
In 2009, Semillitas was launched by Somos TV initially in The United States. Semillitas targets Hispanic toddlers, preschool and kids aged children with the objective to entertain, educate and help preserve the language and cultural heritage. Semillitas programs violence-free and stop-motion animation content from Latin America and international markets. In October of 2011, Verizon FiOS added the SD version of the channel to their lineup as channel 1723. In September of 2020, the HD version of the channel was added as channel 1721, and subsequently the SD version was removed October of 2020. Semillitas has expanded its coverage internationally, with distribution to Central America, Panama and The Caribbean. in companies such as Claro and Millicom.

In 2019, Semillitas was nominated to the PROMAX Awards in the Total Package Design category.

In 2023, the channel won the prestigious award "Outstanding Achievement: Spanish Media (USA)", presented by The American Council of the Blind, for its support of children with special needs with its inclusion of Audio description in the channel's content.

In 2024, Semillitas celebrated its 15-year Anniversary.

== Programming ==
The programs shown on this channel include: Dr. Panda, Louie, Franny's Feet, Claymotions, Bubu and the Little Owls, Book Hungry Bears, Monkey See Monkey Do, Chuggington, Quiz Time, Tickety Toc, Sid the Science Kid, Doodleboo, Rockoons, Dumper & Skoop, Thomas and Friends, Caillou, Mini Heroes of the Forest, Angelina Ballerina, Franklin and Friends, Babar and the Adventures of Badou, Maya the Bee, P. King Duckling, Strawberry Shortcake, Pocoyo Songs, and Little People.

Semillitas produces a significant amount of hours of in-house produced content to emphasize its cultural relevance. This content complements the educational and Latino family orientation of the channel.

Semillitas includes multi-platform rights The channel is carried by cable television and Telco companies in the U.S., Panama, and Central America and also affiliates part of the NCTC's (National Cable Television Cooperative). NCTC is responsible for acquiring programming and hardware for almost 1000 affiliated companies that own and operate cable television systems in the U.S. Semillitas offers its subscribers a Free VOD Service available in all its carriers.

== Market ==
Semillitas is currently available in the United States, Puerto Rico, Panama, Central America. and The Caribbean. The content of Semillitas has been selected within range of educational and entertaining programming for this age group. The programming emphasizes the relevance of culture and importance of family ties within the Hispanic community. Semillitas is currently available on RCN, Verizon FiOS, Blue Stream, Coyote Cable, Hargray, Tigo (Panama), Incateco, Tigo (Costa Rica, El Salvador, Honduras, and Guatemala) and Claro, among other Pay Television providers.
