= Clic (TV channel) =

Spanish-language Mexican pay television channel

clic
- Final logo used from 2021 to 2025
- Country: Mexico
- Broadcast area: Latin America; United States; Puerto Rico; European Union

Programming
- Language: Spanish
- Picture format: 1080i HDTV (downscaled to 480i/576i for the SD feed)

Ownership
- Owner: TV Azteca Internacional TV de Paga (TV Azteca)
- Sister channels: Azteca Internacional; Corazón; Cinema; Azteca Deportes Network

History
- Launched: 2000 (as Azteca Música)

Links
- Website: www.tvazteca.com/tvpaga/notas/clic

Clic! (formerly: Azteca Música; Az Mix; Az Clic) is a Spanish-language pay television channel owned by TV Azteca Internacional TV de Paga (TV Azteca), specialized in entertainment and lifestyles.

== History ==
It was launched in 2000 as Azteca Musica, a channel mainly dedicated to Music. In September 2014, TV Azteca announced that the channel would be relaunched as Az Mix, a change that occurred on September 14, 2015. A year later, it was announced that the channel would be relaunched as Az Clic. On May 23, 2019, Az Clic would be renamed TV Aztec Clic.

== Programming ==
Program	Description
VideoMatch	Program that analyzes music videos according to their relationship, theme, location or recording circumstances.
Celebrity al descubierto	Celebrity Secrets Reporting Program.
Suena Latam	Music video program featuring artist information or production details for their videos.
Super Hit M3	Behind-the-scenes program of the program Hasta Mañana es Lunes, show the behind-the-scenes process of the program.
El Tribate	Controversial topics debate program about artists.
El Hormiguero MX	Late Night Show where several celebrities are interviewed, and they do various activities based on the homonymous Spanish program.
Conexión	Program that shows the funny, hidden and irrelevant side of music and its representatives.
Mundo Pop	Program Showcasing Iconic Pop Culture Sites.
Rockoleros	Program that presents classic video clips, cult and hits of the moment.
Zona Show	Program that presents advances in theater, cinema, music, shows and culture.
Los 25 más	Program that presents 25 events that have occurred in the world of entertainment, presenting the artists involved.
Be	Program dedicated to the male audience, showing lifestyle tips.
Uncut	Program that shows the internal processes for the production of culture and entertainment events.
Solo Hits	Music program in Spanish and shows data of the artists.
