= FlixLatino =

Spanish-language streaming service based in Miami

- Website type: Subscription video on demand
- Available in: Spanish
- Area served: United States (50 states), Puerto Rico
- Owner: SOMOS Next
- Key people: Luis Guillermo Villanueva (COO, SOMOS Next)
- Website: www.flixlatino.com
- Launched: 2015; 11 years ago
- Current status: Active

FlixLatino is a Spanish-language subscription video on demand streaming service based in Miami, Florida, United States. It is operated by SOMOS Next, a Spanish-language media company. The service was launched in 2015. It offers films, series, and documentaries produced mainly in Latin America and Spain, and is available in the United States and Puerto Rico.

== Overview ==
FlixLatino's catalog consists mainly of Spanish-language films, series, and documentaries in Latin America and Spain. It also carries series from other countries, including Turkey. Most of its films were released in theaters in their countries of origin, and most titles have English subtitles.

SOMOS Next developed the service's streaming technology in-house. FlixLatino is also available through platforms such as Amazon Prime Video channels, The Roku Channel, Vizio, Google TV, Xfinity, Sling TV, Verizon, Apple, Android, Fire TV, and Samsung.

== History ==
SOMOS Next launched FlixLatino in February 2015. It initially included a catalog of several hundred Spanish-language feature films that had been released in theaters throughout Spain and Latin America. At first, viewers in the United States could rent the films through FlixLatino's YouTube channel. The catalog was also distributed through DirecTV's Yaveo platform.

In early 2017, SOMOS Next launched FlixLatino Go, a subscription service offering more than 200 films from Spanish-speaking countries. It was available through the FlixLatino website, iOS, and Android devices, and Roku.

FlixLatino became available on Sling TV as a premium add-on in May 2019. Sling users could buy it with or without a base subscription. At that time, its catalog included more than 250 films, series, and documentaries.

In February 2020, FlixLatino became available on Amazon Prime Video channels.

In February 2021, the service added two linear channels, FlixLatino Live and Flix Kids. Both channels were offered for an additional fee on top of the base subscription. The FlixLatino app also launched on Comcast's Xfinity X1 and Xfinity Flex platforms in October 2021.

In December 2022, the service launched on Google TV. It became available through Verizon's +play in March 2023.

The company signed distribution agreements with The Roku Channel, Vizio, and Claro Puerto Rico in December 2025.
