= Caupolicán Ovalles (filmmaker) =

Venezuelan film director

Caupolicán Ylich Ovalles Sequera
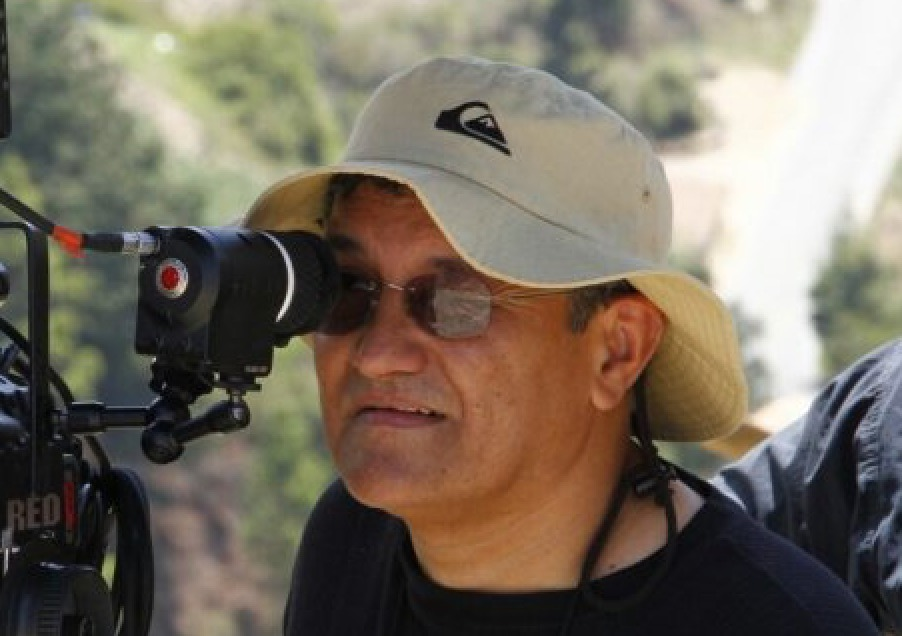
- Born: March 3, 1960 (age 66); Caracas, Venezuela
- Education: Universidad Nacional Experimental Simón Rodríguez
- Occupations: Director, screenwriter, producer.
- Children: 2
- Parent(s): Caupolicán Ovalles and Ana Teresa Sequera

Caupolicán Ylich Ovalles Sequera, (Caracas, March 3, 1960), is a Venezuelan film director, producer and screenwriter. He was president of the Venezuelan Chamber of Feature Film Producers, being a member of the Board of Directors of the Premios Platino del Cine Iberoamericano, and Venezuela’s representative before the Ibero-American Federation of Film and Audiovisual Producers, between the years 2013 - 2018.

He was the scriptwriter, director and executive producer of the series for television Archivo Criminal (Criminal Archive) broadcast by Radio Caracas Televisión (RCTV), and winner of two awards "Dos de Oro". He was also the creator and producer of the Archivos del más Allá (Afterlife Archives) series, nominated in the category of Best International Television Series at the 2003 International Emmy Awards.

Within his role as a filmmaker, he was director, screenwriter and producer of the film Memorias de un Soldado (Memoirs of a Soldier), his debut feature film, winner of 12 awards at the mayor film festivals in Venezuela and showcased at the XV Shanghai International Film Festival.

In 2018 he premiered in Venezuela his second feature film, Muerte en Berruecos (Death in Berruecos) a thriller that goes deep into investigations of the murder of the "Grand Marshal of Ayacucho" Antonio José de Sucre, which occurred in June 1830. Later in 2019, the film was premiered in Ecuador and USA. In 2021, the film was a candidate for Best Ibero-American Film at the 35th edition of the Goya Awards.

== Biography ==
=== Early life ===
Caupolicán is the second of five siblings, born from the union between the venezuelan author, Rafael Honorio Caupolicán Ovalles Colmenares and founder of the Athenaeum of Barquisimeto and the Venezuelan Federation of Athenaeums, Ana Teresa Sequera.

From an early age, he was raised surrounded by contrasts between political ideals, art, literature and culture in general. Thanks to the social circle in which his parents worked, Ovalles Sequera was always in touch with prominent figures, including directors, actors, writers, plastic artists and novelists, who were a relevant influence for his future career.

=== Studies ===
During his teenage years, he spend his life living between different countries in Europe and Venezuela, studying high school in Spain and then returning to Caracas.

After reaching adulthood, in 1979 he decided to move to Milan (Italy) captivated by the great cultural, artistic and cinematographic movement going on during those times. In this city he began photography studies at the Istituto Europeo di Design, and later enrolled in the Centro di Formazione Professionale per la Técnica Cinetelevisiva, where he studied film and television direction and production, making his first documentaries, one of them about the La Scala Theater and another dedicated to Venice.

When he was 23 years old he completed his training in Italy and returns to Venezuela where he films Los Caminos de Hierro (The Iron Roads), a documentary about the history of the railways in Venezuela. This work was awarded as the Best Cultural Documentary by the National Short Film Festival Manuel Trujillo Durán, in 1985.

While living in his country, he continued his professional training at the Universidad Nacional Experimental Simón Rodríguez, where he earned an Audiovisual Education’s degree and began a career by working in emblematic television documentaries produced by the oil company Lagoven, and working as an independent filmmaker for Radio Caracas Televisión.

In 1993 he traveled to Los Angeles to conduct various workshops at the University of California on scripts writing, programming and budgeting. In 2005 he joined the RCTV Film and Television Academy, where he studied "Effective management skills" and "Project definition, planning and monitoring". Subsequently, in 2009 he joined the Film Media Business School in Rio de Janeiro, in 2012 he completed a Master's Degree as a Digital Cinema Director and Producer at the University of La Laguna de Tenerife (Spain).

=== Career ===
In the early stages of his career, he worked as documentaries director and producer for the television series Cuadernos Lagoven en la pantalla, of which two episodes won awards at national film festivals: Los caminos de hierro (The Iron Roads) at the Manuel Trujillo Durán Festival (1985) and El llanero, at the Festival Nacional de Cine de Mérida (National Film Festival of Mérida) (1995).

In 1990 he joined PRISMAVISION C.A. as executive producer of international feature films, where he produced in Venezuela the following productions:

• American ninja V para Cannon Pictures (USA) / International Movie Services (Italy)

• Le gorille for Dolly Films y RAI (Italy)

• Wins for Cannon Pictures (USA) / International Movie Services (Italy)

From 1995 to 2002, he worked as an independent producer at Radio Caracas Televisión (RCTV) and in 2003 he joined the network as production manager. In 2005 he was promoted to Independent & External Productions and Co-productions Manager, being responsible for the compliance of the Law on Social Responsibility on Radio and Television by the network, as well as for the development of the production of different drama series and telefilms, including hits such as La rumba del fin del mundo (2005), María Lionza (2006) and Señor Presidente (2007).

=== Guild Activity ===
Ovalles has been involved in the training and diffusion of productions, and activities related to the national and international cinematographic guild, being a member of the board of directors of the Asociación Nacional de Autores Cinematográficos - ANAC (National Association of Cinematic Authors) and President of the Venezuelan Chamber of Feature Films Producers (CAVEPROL) from 2011 to 2016.

Likewise, he was president and is a member of the Committee responsible for selecting the Venezuelan film nominated for the Oscar Awards. He also is the representative of Venezuela before the Ibero-American Federation of Cinematographic and Audiovisual Producers (Federación Iberoamericana de Productores Cinematográficos y Audiovisuales - FIPCA), was a member of its board of directors, and is currently a Jury of the Platinum Awards of Ibero-American Cinema.

Caupolicán is also one of the founders of the Venezuelan Film Academy (Academia de Cine de Venezuela - ACACV), in which he acts as president. He is a founding member of the Ibero-American Federation of Film Academies (Federación Iberoamericana de Academias de Cine - FIACINE) and President of the Hispanic Independent Producers of America (HIPA)

== Filmography ==
=== Short films ===
Year	Title	Role	Note
1998-2001	Venezuela temática (shorts: Quirpa, Memorias de un soldado, Boda en el barrio y Valle de Quibor)	Director, producer	90 sec micro-shorts for the CONAC Venezuela temática series. Format: 35mm
2001	Alto esa patria hasta segunda orden	Director, producer	8 min. Short. Format: 35mm

=== Feature films ===
Year	Title	Role	Nota
1988	La collina del diavolo	Assistant Director	Director: Vittorio Sindoni. Format: 35mm
1991	Il gorilla in Amazzonia	Executive Producer	Director: Duccio Tessari. Format: 35mm
1992	American Ninja V	Executive Producer	Director: Bobby Jean L. Format: 35 mm
1992	Roraima	Assistant Director	Director: Carlos Oteyza. Format: 35mm
2007	Señor Presidente	Executive Producer	Director: Rómulo Guardia
2008	Cuidado con lo que sueñas	Executive Producer	Director: Geyka Urdaneta. Format: S - 16mm
2011	Memorias de un soldado	Director, producer	Format: HD – 35mm
2018	Muerte en Berruecos	Director, screenwriter, producer	Format: HD – 35mm

=== TV films ===
Year	Title	Role	Note
2003	El chupacabras	Executive producer, director with Luisa de la Ville	Format: Betacam digital 90 min.
2004	La Sayona	Executive Producer, director with Pablo de la Barra	
2005	La rumba de fin de mundo	Executive Producer	Director: Rómulo Guardia. Format: 16mm
2006	María Lionza	Executive Producer	Director: Luis Gaitán. Format: Betacam digital 90 min.

=== Documentaries, shows and TV series ===
Year	Title	Role	Note
1985	Los caminos de hierro/El ferrocarril Bolívar	Director, producer	Best Cultural Documentary at the National Short Film Festival Manuel Trujillo Durán (Maracaibo, 1985). Documentary for Cuadernos Lagoven en la pantalla series.
1990	Gli italiani nel Venezuela	Screenwriter, Executive Producer	Format: Betacam SP, 30 min. Network: RAI 3 (Italia), TF (France).
1992	Relatos del taita Páez	Director, producer	Docudrama for Cuadernos Lagoven en la pantalla series.
1992 – 2002	Archivo criminal	Screenwriter, general producer, one of several directors	Director and wrote 40 episodes and produced other 160 episodes. Awarded as the Best Reality Show by “Dos de Oro” in 1999 and 2001.
1994	Las cuatro repúblicas	Produces, assistant director	Docudrama of 13 episodes for the Cuadernos Lagoven en la pantalla series. Director: Sergio Sierra
1995	El llanero	Director, producer	Awarded as the Best Cultural Documentary at Festival Nacional de Cine de Mérida (1995). Cuadernos Lagoven en la pantalla series.
1995 – 1998	Un Ángel en su cocina	General Producer	Director and producer of 600 30 minutes shows. RCTV
2000 -2002	Archivos del más allá	Executive Producer	Short listed as the Best TV series of Latin America, and Best Reality Show at the International Emmy Awards, 2003.
2014	Tribu races	Director, producer	Reality Show and Web-episodes DeLand, Florida. GOTV (Miami, Florida)
2017	Especial show: IV Premios Platino del Cine Iberoamericano	Director	Produced in Madrid and broadcast in the US by Galavisión and in Mexico by Televisa.

=== Awards and nominations ===
Year	Country	Festival / Award	Category	Show / Film	Result
1985	(Venezuela)	Festival Nacional de Cortometrajes Manuel Trujillo Durán (Maracaibo, Venezuela)	Best Cultural Documentary	Los caminos de hierro	Won
1995	(Venezuela)	Festival Nacional de Cine y Vídeo de Mérida	Best Cultural and informative Documentary	El llanero	Won
1999	(Venezuela)	Dos de Oro (Caracas, Venezuela)	Best Reality Show	Archivo Criminal	Won
2001	(Venezuela)	Dos de Oro (Caracas, Venezuela)	Best Reality Show	Archivo criminal	Won
2003	(United States)	Emmy International (USA)	Best Latin American TV Series Best reality show	Archivo del más allá	Shortlist
2007		IBERMEDIA	Support in the development of a Film project	Memorias de un soldado	Won
2009	(Venezuela)	CNAC	Debut Feature Film	Memorias de un soldado	Won
2011	(Venezuela)	CNAC	Script development	Muerte en Berruecos	Won
2012	(China)	Shanghai International Film Festival (Shanghai, China)	Spectrum	Memorias de un soldado	Official selection
2012	(Venezuela)	Festival Entre Largos y Cortos (Pto. La Cruz, Venezuela)	Best script / Best production	Memorias de un soldado	Awarded
2012	(Venezuela)	Festival de Cine Latinoamericano y Caribeño (Margarita, Venezuela)	Official Selection "Debut Feature Film"	Memorias de un soldado	Official selection
2012	(Cuba)	Festival del Nuevo Cine Latinoamericano (La Havana, Cuba)	Latin America Panorama	Memorias de un soldado	Official selection
2013		El universo del espectáculo	Best Staging, Best Art Direction, Best general production	Memorias de un soldado	Awarded
2013	(Venezuela)	CNAC	Project development	Muerte en Berruecos	Awarded
2014		IBERMEDIA	Coproduction	Muerte en Berruecos	Awarded
2018	(Ecuador)	Festival Internacional de Cine de Guayaquil (Guayaquil, Ecuador)	Best Art Direction	Muerte en Berruecos	Awarded
2018		Platino Awards	Best Fiction film / Best Direction	Muerte en Berruecos	Official preselection
2019	(Venezuela)	ACACV Awards	Best Art Direction Best Make up Best wardrobe Best Sound	Muerte en Berruecos	Awarded
2021	(Spain)	Goya Awards	Best Ibero-American Film	Muerte en Berruecos	Candidate
