= TV Azteca Guate =

Guatemalan television network

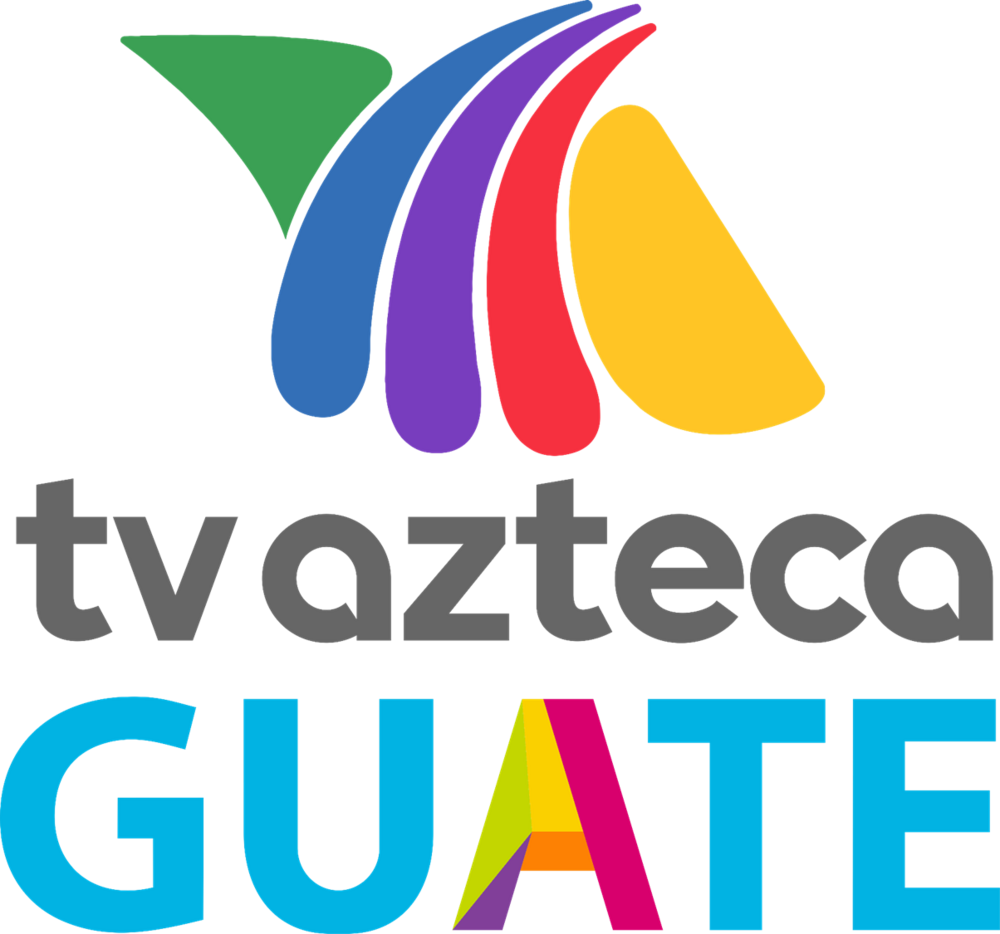
- Country: Guatemala
- Headquarters: Zone 3, Mixco, Guatemala Department

Programming
- Language: Spanish
- Picture format: 16:9 1080i HDTV

Ownership
- Owner: TV Azteca (70%); Latitud Televisión (30%)
- Key people: Benjamín Salinas Sada (vice-president of Televisión Azteca); José Eduardo Valdizán (CEO of Latitud Televisión)
- Sister channels: A Más Guate

History
- Launched: June 5, 2006 (as Latitud Televisión); September 29, 2008 (as TV Azteca)
- Former names: Latitud Televisión (2006–2008); Azteca 31 [Treinta y Uno] (2008–2011); Azteca Guatemala (2011–2015)

Links
- Website: tvaztecaguate.com

Availability

Terrestrial
- Analog UHF: Channel 31

TV Azteca Guate is a Guatemalan free-to-air television channel owned by TV Azteca. It broadcasts on two analog frequencies in Guatemala City, channel 31 as its main station, under the name TV Azteca Guate, and channel 35, under the name A Más Guate. Its facilities and studios are located in Zone 3 of Mixco, within the Guatemala Department.

== History ==
The channel began operations on March 5, 2006, under the television company Latitud Televisión, operating channels 31 and 35 UHF in Guatemala City, they were owned by the Botrán family (owners of the liquor company Industrias Licoreras de Guatemala). In 2007, Grupo Salinas—the parent company of TV Azteca—acquired a 70% stake in Latitud Televisión and began operating UHF channels 31 and 35 in Guatemala City.

On September 6, 2013, a fire broke out at the TV Azteca Guatemala studios, completely destroying the filming sets. Preliminary reports indicated the blaze started in one of the soundstages, where highly flammable production materials caused the flames to spread rapidly, following the incident, the network implemented cost-cutting measures, shifting to the use of chroma key backgrounds for the majority of its programming.

Throughout June and July 2018, TV Azteca Guate aired all 64 matches of the FIFA World Cup in Russia for the first time. This was made possible through an agreement with Tigo Sports Guatemala, resulting in a 31.5-point rating that surpassed other local networks. In March 2021, the two companies renewed their partnership, granting TV Azteca free-to-air rights for several FIFA events, including the 2021 FIFA Futsal World Cup and 2021 FIFA Beach Soccer World Cup World Cups, as well as full coverage of the 64 matches of the 2022 FIFA World Cup in Qatar.

Starting in May 2022, TV Azteca Guate significantly expanded its reach by moving to channel 8 on most national cable providers. This strategic move aimed to broaden its domestic household coverage. By early 2024, the network reported a 47.8% audience growth within the first seven weeks of the year. In the first week of July 2024 alone, the channel reached 5.3 million viewers, establishing itself as the fastest-growing network with the highest ratings in Guatemala.

== A Más Guate ==
A Más Guate
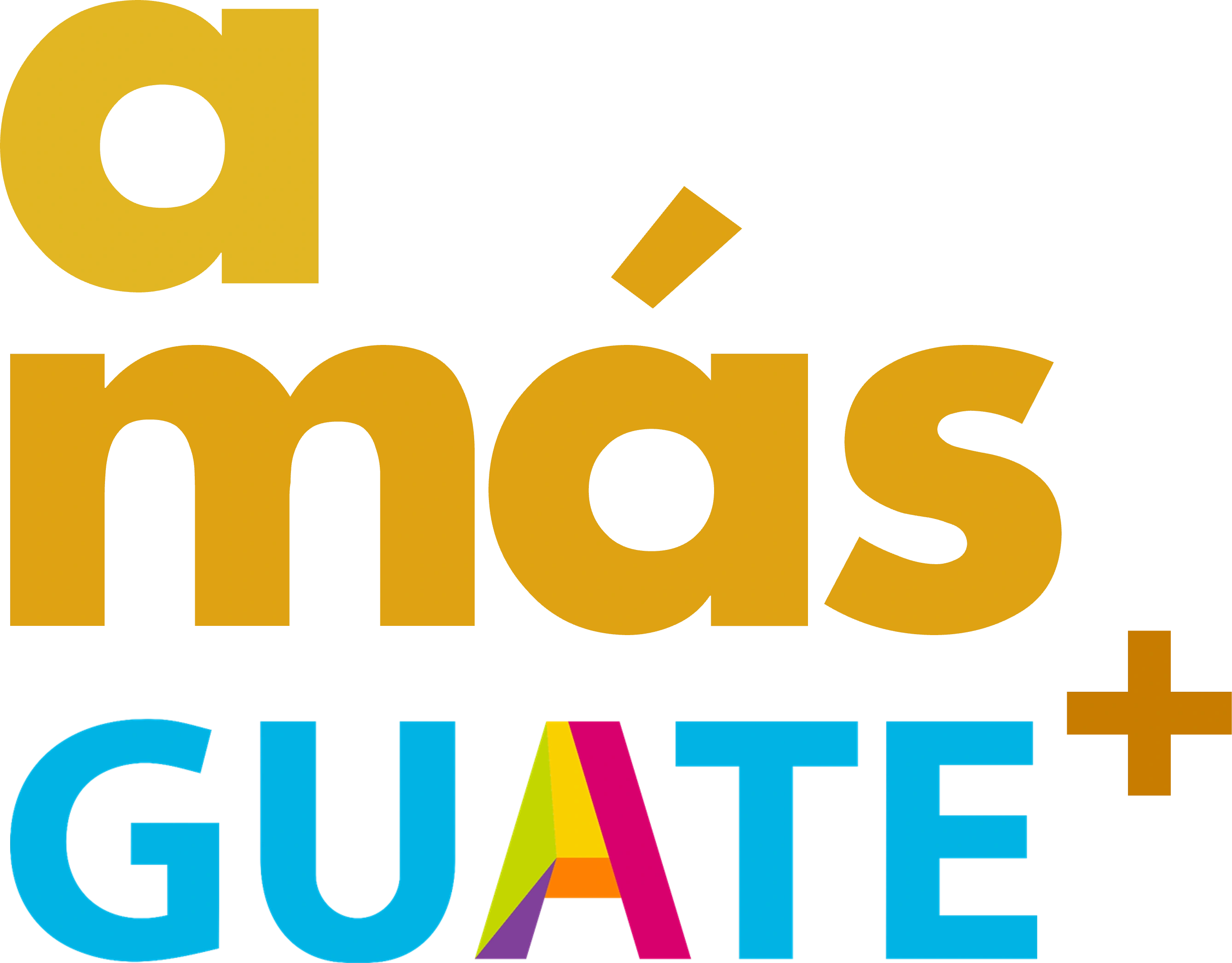
- Type: Free-to-air
- Country: Guatemala

Programming
- Language: Spanish
- Picture format: 16:9 1080i HDTV

Ownership
- Owner: TV Azteca

History
- Former names: Azteca 35 (2008-2017); A+ Guate (2020-2022)

Availability

Terrestrial
- Analog UHF: Channel 35

A Más Guate is a free-to-air television station operated by TV Azteca Guatemala, broadcasting on UHF channel 35 in Guatemala City. The frequency originally operated under Latitud Televisión from 2006 until March 2008, when Grupo Salinas acquired a 70% stake in the broadcaster. Under its former branding as Azteca 35, the station's reach was primarily limited to the capital city, and its lineup consisted mostly of tape-delayed programming from the network’s main signal.

In October 2020, the channel underwent a major rebranding to become A Más Guate, adopting the visual identity of Mexico’s A Más network. Since this transition, the station has expanded its availability through various cable providers. Currently, the channel does not produce original local content; instead, its schedule features a mix of syndicated entertainment, children's programming, classic cinema, and music videos. Its lineup also includes telenovelas produced by TV Azteca, alongside occasional live broadcasts and sporting events.
