= TV Azteca =

Mexican multimedia conglomerate

Televisión Azteca, S.A.B. de C.V.
- Trade name: TV Azteca
- Formerly: Televisión Azteca, S.A. de C.V. (1993–2006)
- Type: Sociedad Anónima de Capital Variable
- Traded as: BMV: AZTECACPO; BMAD: XTZA
- ISIN: MX01AZ060013
- Industry: Mass media
- Predecessor: Imevisión (1983-1993)
- Founded: August 2, 1993; 33 years ago
- Founder: Hugo Salinas Price
- Headquarters: Mexico City, Mexico
- Area served: Worldwide
- Key people: (CEO); Benjamín Salinas Sada (President); Ricardo Salinas Pliego
- Products: Television broadcasting, radio and multimedia
- Revenue: ▲US$ 3.9 Billion (2012)
- Net income: ▲US$ 2 Billion (2012)
- Number of employees: 6,000
- Parent: Grupo Salinas
- Website: www.tvazteca.com

Televisión Azteca, commonly known as TV Azteca, is a Mexican multimedia conglomerate owned by Grupo Salinas. It is the second-largest mass media company in Mexico after Televisa. It primarily competes with Televisa as well as some local operators. It owns two national television networks, Azteca Uno and Azteca 7, and operates two other nationally distributed services, adn40 and A Más+. All three of these networks have transmitters in most major and minor cities. Alongside this, TV Azteca also runs a collection of pay TV networks.

== History ==
=== Formation ===
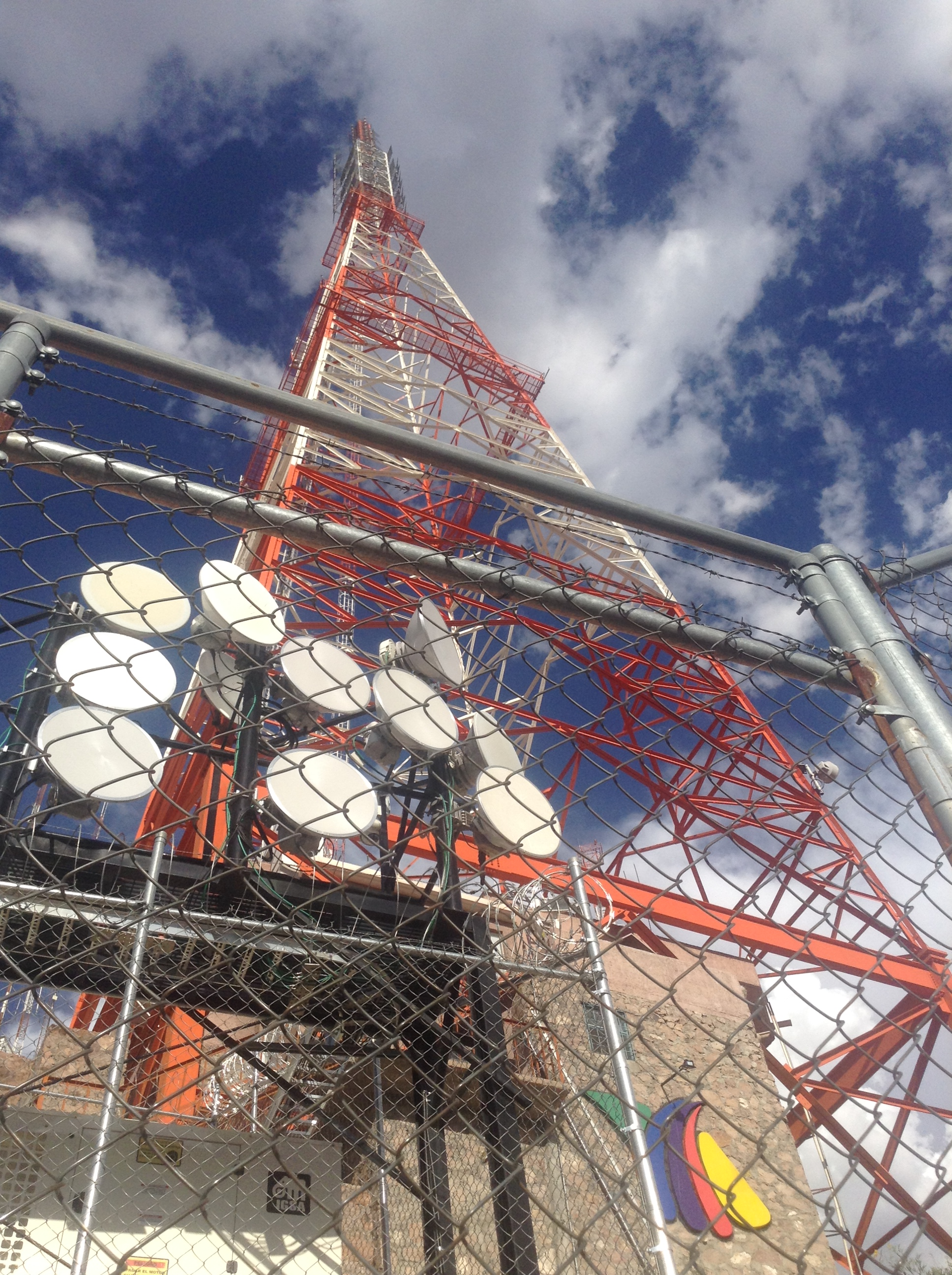
TV Azteca, Chihuahua City, Chihuahua.

In the early 1990s, the presidency of Carlos Salinas de Gortari privatized many government assets. Among them was the Instituto Mexicano de la Televisión, known as Imevisión, which owned two national television networks (Red Nacional 7 and Red Nacional 13) and three local TV stations. In preparation for the privatization, the Imevisión stations were parceled into a variety of newly created companies, the largest of which was named Televisión Azteca, S.A. de C.V.

With the exception of Canal 22, which was spun off to Conaculta, one bidder won all of the stations. On July 18, 1993, Mexico's Finance Ministry, the Secretaría de Hacienda y Crédito Público (SHCP), announced that Radio Televisora del Centro, a group controlled by Ricardo Salinas Pliego, was the winner of the auction to acquire the "state-owned media package", which also included Imevisión's studios in the Ajusco area of Mexico City. The winning bid amounted to US$645 million. The new group soon took on the Televisión Azteca name for the entire operation and soon challenged Televisa, turning what had been a television monopoly into a television duopoly. The two conglomerates held 97 percent of the commercial television concessions in the country.

=== Expansion ===
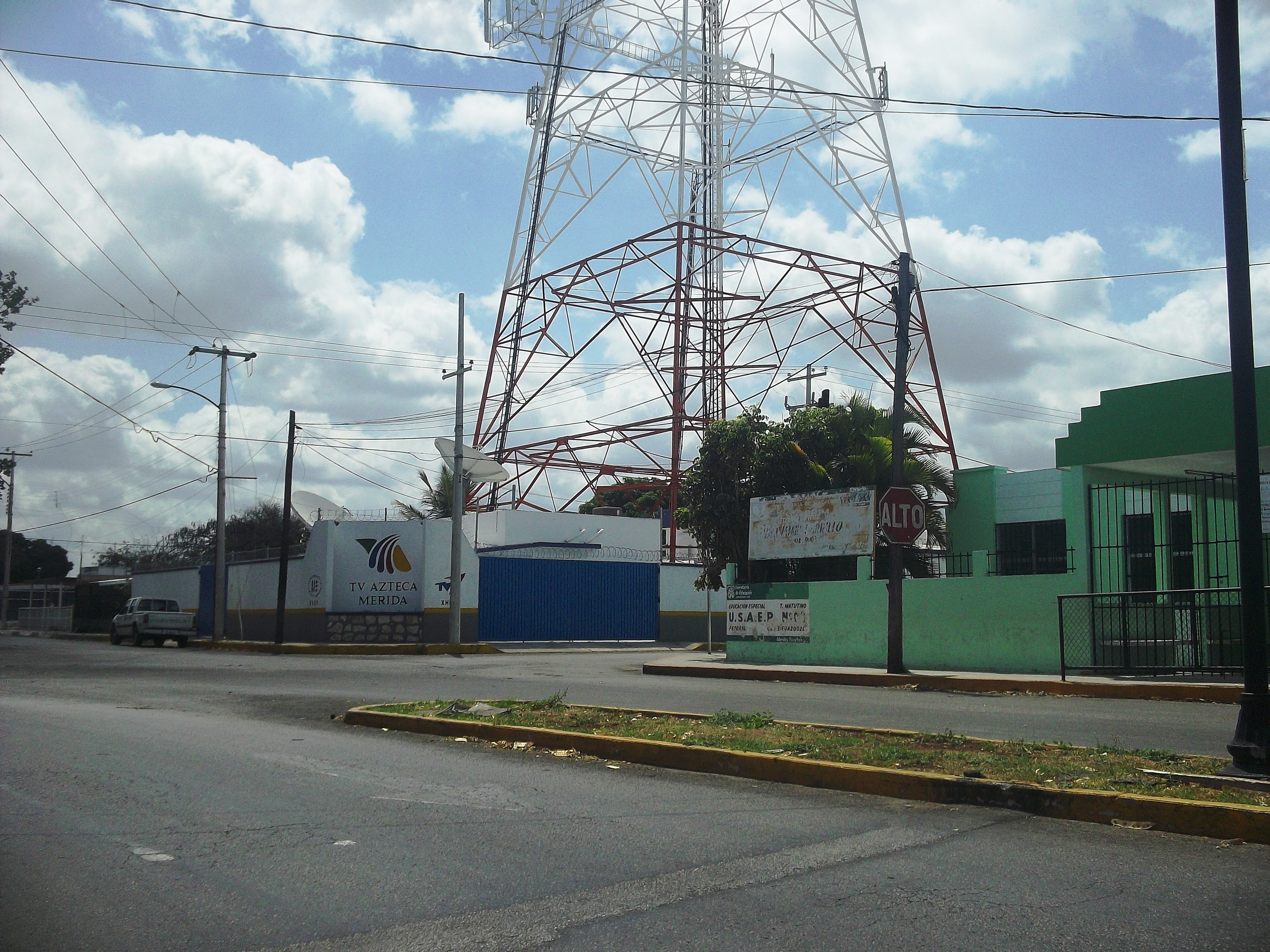
TV Azteca, Mérida, Yucatán.

In 1998, TV Azteca announced an investment of US$25 million in XHTVM-TV, which was owned by Javier Moreno Valle through concessionaire Televisora del Valle de México, S.A. de C.V. Under the deal, Azteca restructured TVM and took control of ad sales and most programming duties, while Moreno Valle's CNI news service retained some primetime space. However, in 2000, Moreno Valle broke the contract with Azteca, alleging Azteca of filling up time allotted to CNI and not fulfilling the obligations in the contract. In December 2002, Azteca used private security guards to retake control of the XHTVM facilities on Cerro del Chiquihuite in Mexico City. However, the Mexican government stepped into the dispute and forced Azteca to relinquish control of XHTVM. In 2005, an employee strike that crippled CNI, Moreno Valle's mounting legal troubles, and a deal with the 5% owner of the concessionaire allowed Azteca to buy the remainder of the station and retake control of XHTVM, under the name Proyecto 40, in 2006.

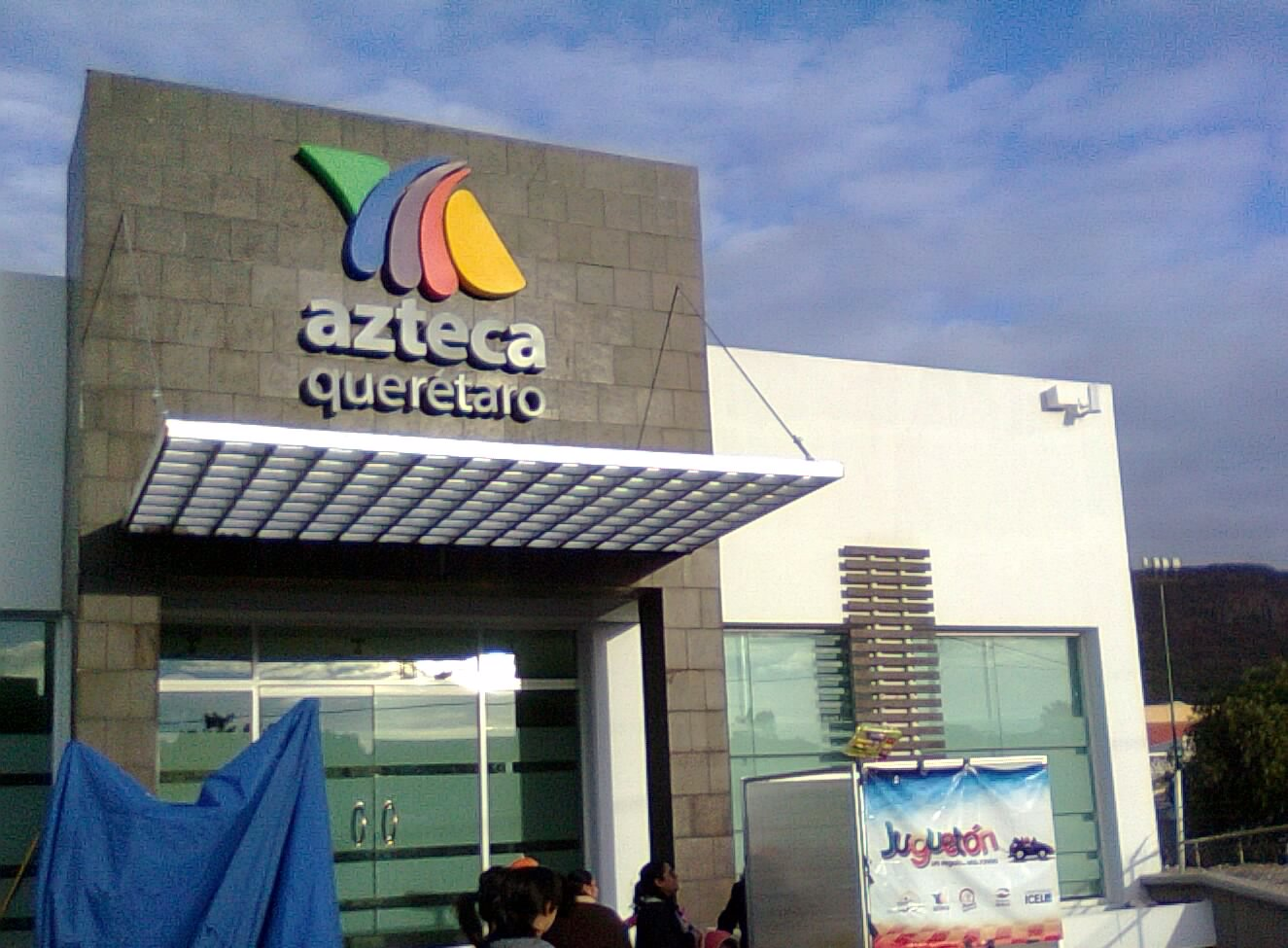
TV Azteca, Querétaro City, Querétaro.

On March 7, 2011, TV Azteca changed its name to Azteca, reflecting its growth into a multimedia company. However, in May 2016, the TV Azteca name was restored.

TV Azteca is the second largest mass media company in México after Televisa. These two big organizations control the 97% of mass media in Mexico. TV Azteca was funded in 1993 by Ricardo Salinas Pliego. TV Azteca has 31% of the 465 television concessions in México. The auction of the state channels and the granting of further concessions to TV Azteca further strengthen their connection. It also owns Azteca banks, Azteca insurance, Iusacell, programing pay television, cinemas, live theater, news channels, newspapers, Azteca music, an acting school, Azteca consumer products, Azteca internet, Azteca series, Azteca sports, stadiums, etc. TV Azteca is another company which also serves the government however to a much lesser extent than Televisa. TV Azteca also receives lucrative contracts from the Mexican government, and therefore the information that emits is also controlled by the actual government. The news that is normally emitted by TV Azteca is 25% news bulletins that come from advertising, and infotainment relying on celebrities and biased editorials.

On March 21, 2023, creditors for the company pushed the company into an involuntary Chapter 11 bankruptcy petition in the U.S. However, on April 26, TV Azteca asked the New York bankruptcy judge to dismiss its Chapter 11 case due to it being pointless to start reorganization proceedings for the company anywhere but Mexico. On June 1, 2023, TV Azteca was suspended from the Mexico Stock Exchange.

On February 26, 2026, TV Azteca applied for bankruptcy proceedings in Mexico in an effort to strengthen finances and liabilities. The company blamed several factors contributing to its decision, including a $2 billion payment in back taxes to Mexican authorities, license payment impacts and the overall impact the company faced as a result of the COVID-19 pandemic.

== Services ==
=== Terrestrial networks ===
In Mexico

Network	Flagship	Programming
Azteca Uno	XHDF 1	general programming and news and first-run telenovelas
Azteca 7	XHIMT 7	general programming, sports, and series
adn Noticias	XHTVM 40	news and informational shows
a Más	XHIMT 7.2	network of several television channels with local programming

Outside Mexico

Network	Flagship	Programming
TV Azteca Guate	N/A	Guatemalan channel with programming from TV Azteca's three television national networks in Mexico and local news
TV Azteca Honduras	N/A	Honduran channel with programming from TV Azteca's three television national networks in Mexico and local news

=== Formerly owned ===
- Azteca América: American broadcast network with programming from TV Azteca's three television national networks in Mexico and local news. The owner, HC2 Holdings, continued to use the Azteca branding under license. Ceased operations on December 31, 2022.
- KAZA-TV used to be the flagship of Azteca América from 2001 to 2018 but was sold to Chicago-based Weigel Broadcasting, which stripped KAZA of its flagship status, and was replaced by MeTV as an O&O.

=== Cable ===
- TV Azteca Clic! (also broadcast)
- Azteca Internacional
- TV Azteca Corazón (also broadcast)
- TV Azteca Cinema
- Azteca Uno -1 hora
- Azteca Uno -2 horas
- Azteca Deportes Network
- Romanza+ África - African channel

== Disputes and controversies ==
On 5 January 2005, the U.S. Securities and Exchange Commission (SEC) accused TV Azteca executives (including chairman Ricardo Salinas Pliego) of having personally profited from a multimillion-dollar debt fraud committed by TV Azteca and another company in which they held stock. The charges were among the first brought under the provisions of the Sarbanes-Oxley Act of 2002, introduced in the wake of the corporate financial scandals of that year.

The Federal Radio and Television Law (known as the Ley Televisa) was a bill concerning the licensing and regulation of the electromagnetic spectrum. The LFRT was favorable to both TV Azteca and Televisa (who together control 95 percent of all television frequencies) because it allowed them to renew their licenses without paying for them. According to The Economist, the Ley Federal de Radio y Televisión "raced through Congress confirming the country's longstanding television duopoly" and constituted a "giveaway of radio spectrum and a provision that allows broadcasting licenses to be renewed more or less automatically".

In February 2012, TV Azteca networks (Azteca 7, Azteca 13, and Proyecto 40) were dropped by Mexican cable-TV carriers representing more than 4 million subscribers in a carriage dispute over terms. Cable operators claimed that Azteca wanted to charge a fee by packaging its over-the-air stations with cable networks, such as news and soap opera channels, which potentially represented a higher cost to subscribers. After a nine-month absence, TV Azteca returned gradually to cable operators.

In August 2018, American Tower's Mexican Unit, MATC Infraestructura sued TV Azteca for $97 Million in a New York court for defaulting on a loan from the company.

== Holdings ==
TV Azteca is part of the conglomerate Grupo Salinas, which includes the Grupo Elektra franchise of department stores, the Banco Azteca bank, and Seguros Azteca life insurance. TV Azteca also owns Liga MX soccer club, Mazatlán F.C.

=== Acting school ===
The network has set up an acting school, Centro de Estudios y Formación Actoral (CEFAT). Alumni include Iliana Fox, Luis Ernesto Franco, Adriana Louvier, Fran Meric, Bárbara Mori, Laura Palma and Adrián Rubio.

=== Record label ===
The network also owns a record label, Azteca Music, which was founded in 1996.

== Logos ==
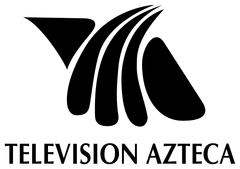
1993

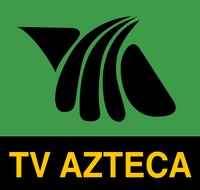
1993-1994

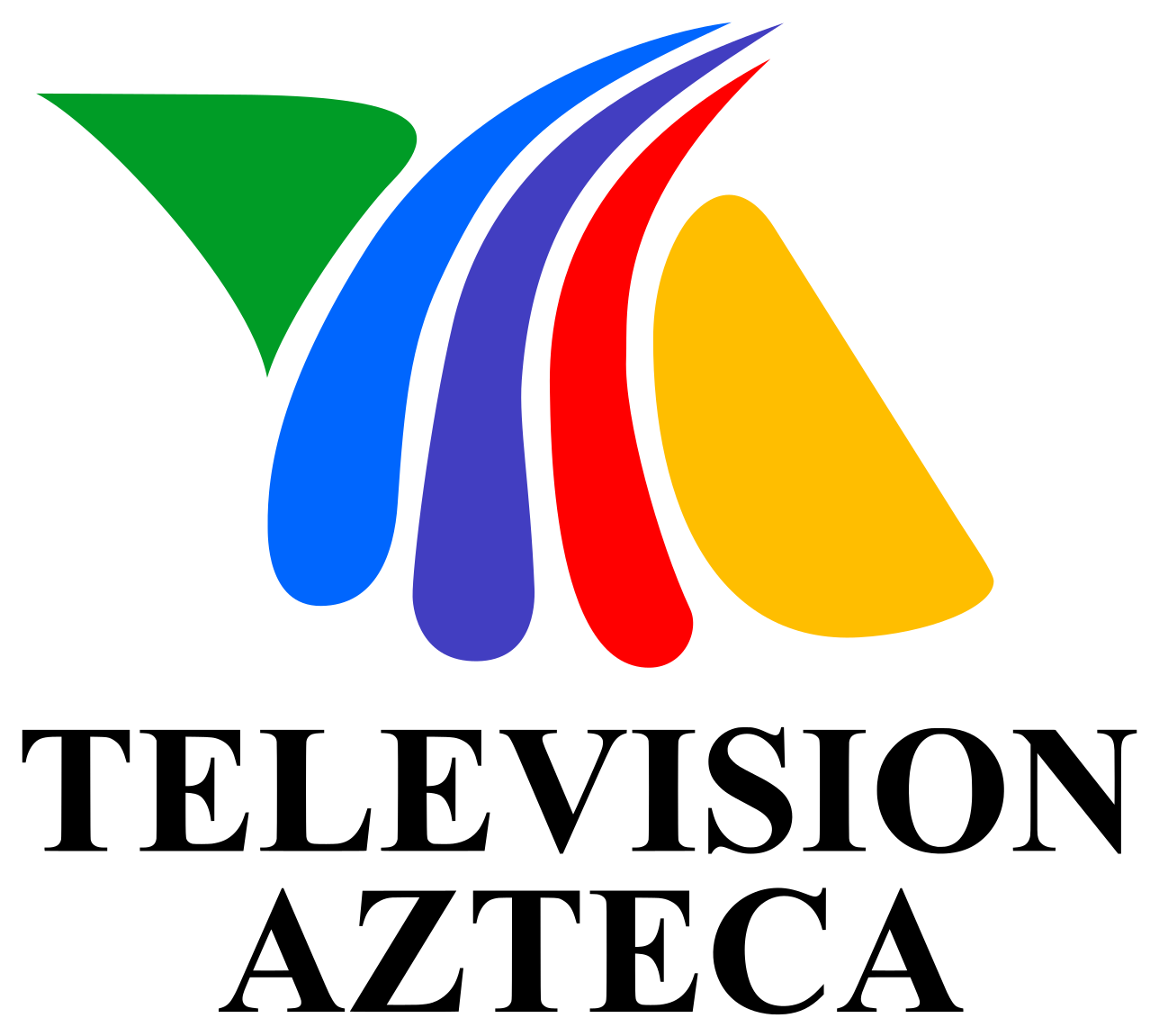
1994-1996

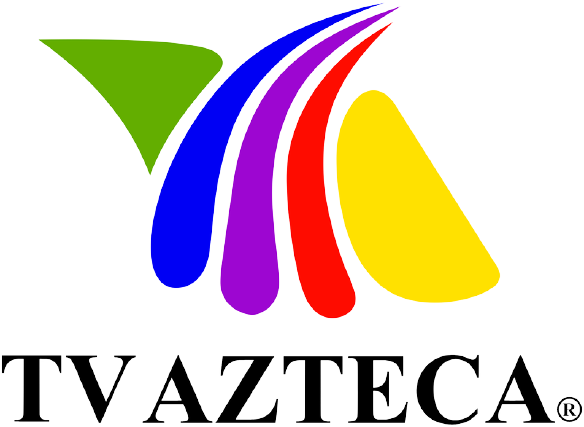
1996-2011

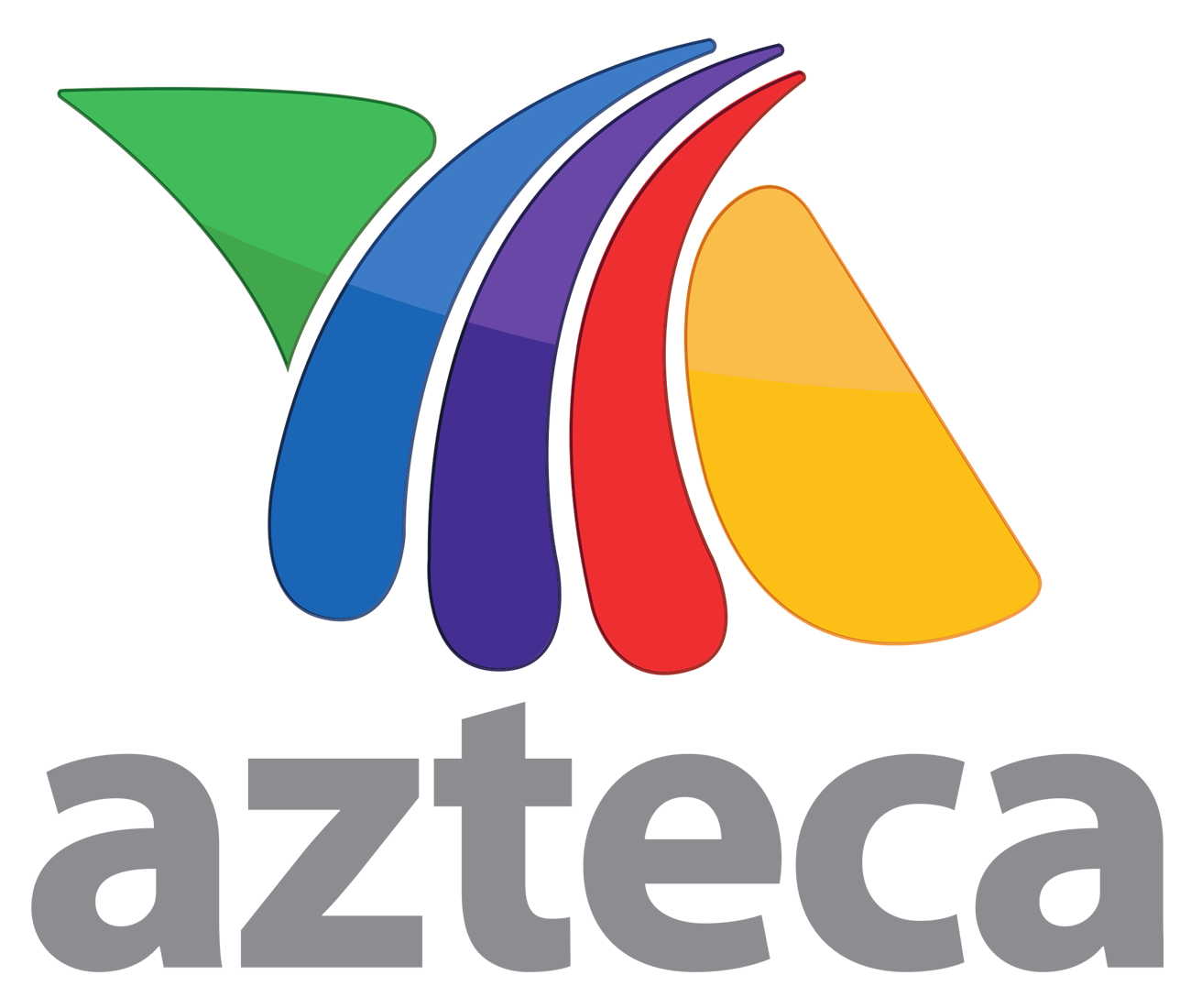
2011-2016

2016-present

== See also ==
- Televisa
- List of Broadcasting Companies in Latin America
