= Life or Something Like It =

2002 film by Stephen Herek

- Theatrical release poster
- Directed by: Stephen Herek
- Screenplay by: John Scott Shepherd; Dana Stevens
- Story by: John Scott Shepherd
- Produced by: John Davis; Arnon Milchan; Toby Jaffe; Chi-Li Wong
- Starring: Angelina Jolie; Edward Burns; Tony Shalhoub; Stockard Channing
- Cinematography: Stephen H. Burum
- Edited by: Trudy Ship
- Music by: David Newman
- Production companies: Davis Entertainment; New Regency
- Distributed by: Regency Enterprises (through 20th Century Fox) (Note: Fox distributed the film in the United States and all territories except Italy (Medusa Film).)
- Release date: April 26, 2002
- Running time: 103 minutes
- Country: United States
- Language: English
- Budget: $40 million
- Box office: $16.9 million

Life or Something Like It is a 2002 American romantic comedy-drama film directed by Stephen Herek. Starring Angelina Jolie, most of the film was shot in the Seattle area. The original music score was composed by David Newman.

The plot focuses on television reporter Lanie Kerrigan and her quest to find meaning in her life. The film was released by 20th Century Fox on April 26, 2002, received mostly negative reviews and was a box office bomb, grossing $16.9 million against a $40 million budget.

== Plot ==
Lanie Kerrigan, a successful reporter for a Seattle television station, interviews self-proclaimed prophet Jack to find out if he really can predict football scores. He not only predicts the exact score and that it will hail the next morning, but also that Lanie will die in seven days, on the following Thursday.

When Jack's first two prophecies come true, Lanie panics and again meets with him to ask for another prophecy to test him again. Jack tells her that there will be a relatively significant earthquake in San Francisco at 9:06 am, which also happens. Now Lanie is convinced that she is going to die, so reevaluates her life.

Lanie tries to find consolation in her famous baseball player boyfriend Cal Cooper and in her family, but there is little there. Her lifelong ambition of appearing on network television begins to look like a distant dream. In her desperation, she commits professional blunders but ends up finding support in an unlikely source: her archenemy, the cameraman Pete Scanlon, with whom she once had casual sex.

Pete introduces Lanie to a new approach to life: to live every moment of life to the fullest and to do whatever she had always wanted to do. She spends a day with him and his son Tommy, who lives with his mother.

That night Lanie and Pete sleep together for the second time. The next day Lanie receives an opportunity for her dream job in New York. She asks Pete to come with her, but he declines, telling her that her appetite for success and fame will never end. Lanie leaves for New York.

Pete finds Jack to tell him how wrong he is, as Lanie got the job which he foretold she would not get. However, Jack explains that he was right, as Lanie will never be able to do the job because she will die before it begins. He also gives a prophecy of an angel falling from the sky. When Pete hears a famous former Angels baseball player died in a plane crash, he tries to call Lanie to warn her. Then, when he cannot reach her, he flies to New York.

Lanie - unconcerned with Jack's prophecy - interviews her idol, famous media personality Deborah Connors. Realizing how petty the opening set questions are, she improvises, sharing a heartfelt moment with Deborah live on air. The interview receives huge ratings. The network immediately offers her a position, but Lanie declines, realizing she wants a life with Pete in Seattle.

As Lanie leaves the studio, a police officer gets into a conflict with a man nearby, who shoots a bullet into the air. Pete tries to warn her from across the street, but she is caught in the crossfire. Lanie dies in the operating theater but is revived. When she wakes up, Pete confesses he has loved her since the first time he saw her, and Lanie tells him she loves him too.

Later, Pete, Lanie, and Tommy watch Cal's baseball game, while Lanie (in a voiceover) says that one part of her has died — the part that did not know how to live life.

== Cast ==
- Angelina Jolie as Lanie Kerrigan
  - Amy Esterle as 15-year-old Lanie Kerrigan (uncredited)
  - Marika Anuik as 10-year-old Lanie Kerrigan
  - Ashlyn Morgan Williams as 5-year-old Lanie Kerrigan
- Edward Burns as Pete Scanlon
- Tony Shalhoub as Prophet Jack
- Christian Kane as Cal Cooper
- Melissa Errico as Andrea
- James Gammon as Pat Kerrigan
- Stockard Channing as Deborah Connors
- Lisa Thornhill as Gwen
  - Kasey Stevens as 5-years-old Gwen
- Greg Itzin as Dennis
- Max Baker as Vin
- Veena Sood as Doctor
- Jesse James Rutherford as Tommy
- Amanda Tapping as Carrie Maddox

== Home media ==
- Life or Something Like It released October 15, 2002 on videocassette and DVD.

== Production ==
The majority of the movie was shot on location in Seattle, Washington, although portions were also filmed in downtown Vancouver, British Columbia. The television station in the movie, KQMO, was actually real-life Seattle television station KOMO-TV (the KOMO logo was altered on the set of KOMO 4 News and on several of KOMO's news vehicles, in addition to a few mic flags).

Several KOMO personalities make cameo appearances; among them are longtime anchors Dan Lewis and Margo Myers (the latter moved to KIRO-TV in January 2005), weather anchor and Front Runners host Steve Pool, and weekend weather anchor Theron Zahn. Other KOMO personalities who made brief cameo appearances include People Helper John Sharify and reporter Michelle Esteban.

Additionally, Vancouver news anchors Pamela Martin and Jill Krop, at the time both employed with BCTV, appeared briefly in scenes shot in the BCTV studios.

== Reception ==
The film received generally unfavorable reviews. On review aggregator website Rotten Tomatoes, Life or Something Like It has an overall rating of 28% based on 120 reviews. The site's critics consensus reads: "Though Jolie is appealing, Life or Something Like It is too contrived and predictable to convincingly convey its message of stopping to smell the roses." Metacritic assigned the film a weighted average score of 31 out of 100 based on 32 critics, indicating "generally unfavorable" reviews. Audiences polled by CinemaScore gave the film an average grade of "B+" on an A+ to F scale.

Jolie's performance in the film earned her a Golden Raspberry Award nomination for Worst Actress.

=== Box office ===
The film was a commercial and financial loss, grossing only $16,872,671 against its $40,000,000 budget. It had an estimated opening weekend gross of $6.7 million, ranking third at the box office but being the biggest opener, however, the final numbers reduced to $6.2 million putting it in fifth place, behind fellow opener Jason X. 65% of the opening weekend audience were female and 53% over 24 and Fox hoped that the film would attract female audiences the following weekend when Spider-Man was released, however, its gross fell 49% following Spider-Man's record opening.
