= Dan Lewis (newsreader) =

American journalist

- Born: December 19, 1949 (age 76)
- Occupation: Journalist
- Known for: News reporting

Dan Lewis (born December 19, 1949) is a former long-time co-anchor and reporter for KOMO-TV in Seattle, Washington.

He came to KOMO-TV in 1987 after working at WJLA-TV in Washington, D.C. Before that, he had worked at WISN-TV, WITI-TV, WLKY-TV, KTBS-TV and KWKH. His career began at WBIG (AM) after graduating from Southern Illinois University Carbondale.

Alongside his co-anchor and reporter Kathi Goertzen, weather forecaster Steve Pool and sports reporter Eric Johnson, they were the third longest-running tenure out of any anchor team in the United States west of the Mississippi River. Until his retirement in 2014, Lewis served as co-anchor for the weekday editions of KOMO 4 News at 6:00 p.m. and 11:00 p.m. with Mary Nam. After multiple surgeries for aggressive recurring meningiomas, Goertzen died on August 13, 2012.

In 2002, Lewis and several other KOMO-TV staff members made cameo appearances in the movie Life or Something Like It, which starred Angelina Jolie and Edward Burns. He also briefly appeared in the 2012 remake of the 1984 film Red Dawn starring Chris Hemsworth, Josh Peck, Josh Hutcherson, Adrianne Palicki, Isabel Lucas, and Jeffrey Dean Morgan.

== Personal life ==
Lewis has three children: Dan Jr., Kristian, and Tim. Tim is the only child to go into broadcasting school and he was formerly weekend sports anchor for KIMA 29 – KEPR 19 in Yakima/Tri-Cities from 2004 to 2006. Tim was formerly also weekend sports anchor for KREM 2 in Spokane from September 2006 – December 2008, then sports director from January 2009 – May 2012, which Lewis's co-worker Eric Johnson held from 1987 to 1989. From May 2012 to June 2016, Tim was the weekend sports anchor/weekday reporter for KOMO-TV, which made him and his dad Dan the second father/son duo on the same TV station, after rival station KIRO-TV former chief meteorologists Harry and Andy Wappler, before Dan retired from the KOMO 4 anchor desk in May 2014.
