= Ken Schram =

American radio personality (1947–2014)

- Born: Kenneth George Schram; December 17, 1947; The Bronx, New York, U.S.
- Died: May 29, 2014 (aged 66); Kirkland, Washington, U.S.
- Education: California State University, Northridge
- Occupation: News/radio broadcaster
- Employer: KOMO 4 (former)
- Spouse: Sandi Schram

Kenneth George Schram (December 17, 1947 – May 29, 2014) was an American news and radio broadcaster. He was based in Seattle, Washington and was the former host of local-affairs show Town Meeting and KOMO 4’s evening news segments called "Schram on the Street." For several years he hosted a radio show, The Commentators, on KOMO Newsradio with conservative John Carlson.

That show was discontinued in September 2010. Starting September 20, 2010, Schram and Carlson each began hosting new, separate shows on the same station, with Carlson on from 9:00AM to Noon and Schram from Noon to 3:00PM. Schram is also known for his personal award, the "Schrammie", which he gave out on the air to "underscore what I think are among the worst of bone-headed decision, and/or the most appalling of asinine behavior", usually to local or regional newsmakers.

After a 35-year career, Ken Schram was laid off from KOMO 4 and Radio on December 7, 2012, citing cutbacks to full-time employees.

On May 28, 2014, Schram's long-time colleague John Carlson announced on the radio that Schram was gravely ill with kidney failure. He died at a hospice in Kirkland, Washington the next day of an infection, aged 66.
