= KNWN =

KNWN may refer to:

- KNWN (AM), a radio station (1000 AM) licensed to Seattle, Washington, United States
- KNWN-FM, a radio station (97.7 FM) licensed to Oakville, Washington
