= 2000 Washington gubernatorial election =

- November 7, 2000
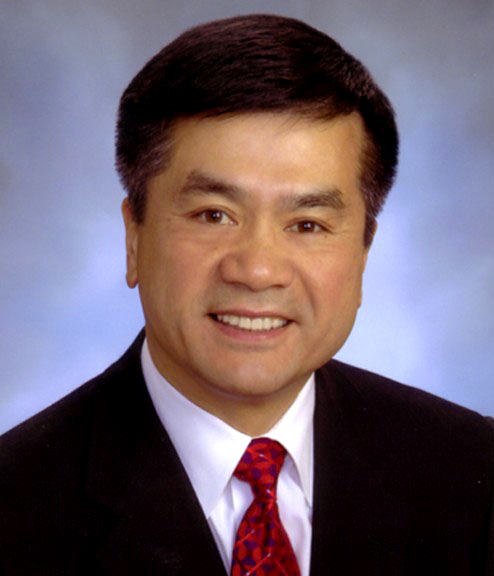

Nominee	Gary Locke	John Carlson
Party	Democratic	Republican
Popular vote	1,441,973	980,060
Percentage	58.38%	39.68%
- County results Locke: 40–50% 50–60% 60–70% Carlson: 40–50% 50–60%
Governor before election
Gary Locke
Democratic
Elected Governor
Gary Locke
Democratic

The 2000 Washington gubernatorial election was held on November 7, 2000. Democratic incumbent Gary Locke was re-elected to a second term in office in a landslide over John Carlson.

As of 2026, this was the earliest gubernatorial election in Washington in which both candidates are currently still living and the most recent election in which the Democratic nominee for governor outperformed the Democratic nominee for president in Washington. Until 2020, it was the last Washington gubernatorial election decided by a double-digit margin or in which any Eastern Washington counties voted for the Democratic nominee.

== Primary election ==
=== Candidates ===
- John Carlson, talk radio host on KVI (Republican)
- Meta Heller (Democratic)
- Harold Hochstatter, state senator from Moses Lake (Republican)
- Gary Locke, incumbent governor of Washington since 1997 (Democratic)
- Steve W. LePage (Libertarian)

=== Results ===
Results by county Locke: 40–50%; 50–60%; 60–70%; Carlson: 40–50%; Hochstatter: 40–50%

Blanket primary results
Party	Candidate	Votes	%
Democratic	Gary Locke	701,929	54.32%
Republican	John Carlson	446,142	34.52%
Republican	Harold Hochstatter	93,467	7.23%
Democratic	Meta Heller	28,578	2.21%
Libertarian	Steve W. LePage	22,186	1.72%
Total votes		1,292,302	100.00%

== General election ==
=== Candidates ===
- John Carlson, talk radio host on KVI (Republican)
- Gary Locke, incumbent governor of Washington since 1997 (Democratic)
- Steve W. LePage (Libertarian)

=== Debates ===
- Complete video of debate, September 28, 2000 - C-SPAN
- Complete video of debate, October 11, 2000 - C-SPAN
- Complete video of debate, October 23, 2000 - C-SPAN

=== Polling ===
Poll source	Date(s)	Sample size	Margin of error	Gary Locke (D)	John Carlson (R)	Other / undecided (Note: Calculated by taking the difference of 100% and all other candidates combined.)
Harris Insights & Analytics	November 3, 2000	6,545	—	56%	43%	1%
SurveyUSA	November 1, 2000	500	—	55%	40%	5%
EMC Research (D) (Note: Poll conducted for an unspecified Democratic sponsor.)	October 21, 2000	500	—	56%	32%	12%
Elway Research	October 19, 2000	400 (RV)	—	56%	31%	13%

=== Results ===
2000 Washington gubernatorial election
Party	Candidate	Votes	%	±%
Democratic	Gary Locke (incumbent)	1,441,973	58.38%	+0.42%
Republican	John Carlson	980,060	39.68%	−2.36%
Libertarian	Steve W. LePage	47,819	1.94%	N/A
Total votes		2,469,852	100.00%	N/A
Democratic hold				

==== By county ====

Kittitas County voted for the losing candidate for the first time since 1948.

As of 2026, this is the most recent election in which any of Asotin, Klickitat, Mason, Pend Oreille, Skamania, Spokane, Wahkiakum and Walla Walla counties voted for the Democratic candidate, and in which the winning candidate won a majority of the counties in the state. Whitman County would not vote Democratic again until 2020. Clallam County would not vote Democratic again until 2024.

County	Gary Locke Democratic		John Carlson Republican		Steve W. LePage Libertarian		Margin		Total votes cast
County	#	%	#	%	#	%	#	%	Total votes cast
Adams	2,250	45.49%	2,629	53.15%	67	1.35%	-379	-7.66%	4,946
Asotin	4,718	59.64%	3,070	38.81%	123	1.55%	1,648	20.83%	7,911
Benton	28,892	48.72%	29,245	49.32%	1,165	1.96%	-353	-0.60%	59,302
Chelan	10,984	41.69%	14,970	56.82%	391	1.48%	-3,986	-15.13%	26,345
Clallam	17,128	53.93%	13,795	43.43%	839	2.64%	3,333	10.49%	31,762
Clark	71,998	54.20%	57,464	43.26%	3,382	2.55%	14,534	10.94%	132,844
Columbia	950	45.28%	1,116	53.19%	32	1.53%	-166	-7.91%	2,098
Cowlitz	20,919	57.28%	14,589	39.95%	1,010	2.77%	6,330	17.33%	36,518
Douglas	5,149	40.12%	7,454	58.08%	232	1.81%	-2,305	-17.96%	12,835
Ferry	1,254	41.62%	1,624	53.90%	135	4.48%	-370	-12.28%	3,013
Franklin	6,757	48.53%	6,832	49.07%	333	2.39%	-75	-0.54%	13,922
Garfield	644	48.42%	646	48.57%	40	3.01%	-2	-0.15%	1,330
Grant	9,491	40.05%	13,673	57.70%	531	2.24%	-4,182	-17.65%	23,695
Grays Harbor	15,817	60.93%	9,566	36.85%	578	2.23%	6,251	24.08%	25,961
Island	17,736	54.31%	14,381	44.04%	541	1.66%	3,355	10.27%	32,658
Jefferson	9,712	61.71%	5,628	35.76%	398	2.53%	4,084	25.95%	15,738
King	522,229	66.46%	250,103	31.83%	13,475	1.71%	272,126	34.63%	785,807
Kitsap	58,603	56.94%	42,358	41.15%	1,966	1.91%	16,245	15.78%	102,927
Kittitas	6,423	45.88%	7,262	51.87%	315	2.25%	-839	-5.99%	14,000
Klickitat	4,278	53.48%	3,468	43.36%	253	3.16%	810	10.13%	7,999
Lewis	12,545	42.18%	16,422	55.21%	777	2.61%	-3,877	-13.03%	29,744
Lincoln	2,083	40.20%	2,984	57.58%	115	2.22%	-901	-17.39%	5,182
Mason	12,319	55.27%	9,473	42.50%	497	2.23%	2,846	12.77%	22,289
Okanogan	5,626	38.36%	8,559	58.36%	481	3.28%	-2,933	-20.00%	14,666
Pacific	5,519	58.68%	3,643	38.73%	244	2.59%	1,876	19.94%	9,406
Pend Oreille	2,621	48.76%	2,590	48.19%	164	3.05%	31	0.58%	5,375
Pierce	148,450	55.60%	113,633	42.56%	4,900	1.84%	34,817	13.04%	266,983
San Juan	5,385	64.83%	2,684	32.31%	237	2.85%	2,701	32.52%	8,306
Skagit	24,191	53.70%	19,990	44.37%	871	1.93%	4,201	9.32%	45,052
Skamania	2,148	53.25%	1,656	41.05%	230	5.70%	492	12.20%	4,034
Snohomish	142,196	56.89%	102,993	41.21%	4,756	1.90%	39,203	15.68%	249,945
Spokane	99,492	57.85%	69,848	40.61%	2,652	1.54%	29,644	17.24%	171,992
Stevens	7,426	41.64%	9,871	55.35%	536	3.01%	-2,445	-13.71%	17,833
Thurston	58,915	61.07%	35,404	36.70%	2,147	2.23%	23,511	24.37%	96,466
Wahkiakum	1,112	57.00%	770	39.47%	69	3.54%	342	17.53%	1,951
Walla Walla	10,869	51.31%	9,936	46.90%	380	1.79%	933	4.40%	21,185
Whatcom	42,313	58.22%	28,861	39.71%	1,500	2.06%	13,452	18.51%	72,674
Whitman	9,113	56.75%	6,676	41.57%	269	1.68%	2,437	15.18%	16,058
Yakima	33,718	48.80%	34,194	49.48%	1,188	1.72%	-476	-0.69%	69,100
Totals	1,441,973	58.38%	980,060	39.68%	47,819	1.94%	461,913	18.70%	2,469,852

==== Counties that flipped from Republican to Democratic ====
- Clallam (largest city: Port Angeles)
- Klickitat (largest city: Goldendale)
- Pend Oreille (largest city: Newport)

==== Counties that flipped from Democratic to Republican ====
- Kittitas (largest city: Ellensburg)
