= Shannon O'Donnell (meteorologist) =

American meteorologist and news anchor

- Born: Shannon Kay O'Donnell; September 27, 1973 (age 53); Redmond, Washington
- Education: University of Washington
- Occupations: News Anchor, Meteorologist

Shannon Kay O'Donnell (born September 27, 1973) is an American meteorologist and news anchor.

O'Donnell was born in Redmond, Washington and attended Redmond High School where she was valedictorian. After graduation, she attended University of Washington, studying meteorology and graduating with a degree in atmospheric sciences. O'Donnell also spent seven years at the NOAA as a marine biologist.

O'Donnell began work for KOMO in Seattle in 1994 where she was mentored by Chief Meteorologist Steve Pool. Two years later, she joined KING in Seattle as the weekend morning meteorologist as well as her concurrent duties for Northwest Cable News. In 1997, she was awarded the AMS Seal of Approval. She held that position until 2000.

O'Donnell joined KNTV, the NBC affiliate for the San Francisco Bay Area in 2001. She won an Emmy award as a meteorologist in 2004, and was named Best TV Weather Anchor in 2005 and 2006. She also reported weather for Early Today, and was a weather substitute for MSNBC from 2003–2006. In 2007, O'Donnell announced that she was leaving KNTV in order to join her husband, who had already returned to their hometown of Seattle to attend graduate school.

O'Donnell returned to KING/NWCN as the weeknight 10pm anchor as well as meteorologist in December 2007. In February 2009, O'Donnell was laid off from KING 5 after massive cuts at that station, including her position on sister station KONG 6/16, and returned to KOMO 4 as a freelance weekend weather anchor. In August 2009, she officially took the role as the weekend weather anchor at KOMO 4.

She is now the chief meteorologist at KOMO 4.
