= Eric Johnson (journalist) =

American television weeknight news anchor

- Born: Spokane, Washington, U.S.
- Occupations: Sports Director and Co-anchor for KOMO-TV
- Years active: 1984-2024

Eric Johnson is a former American television weeknight news anchor for KOMO 4 in Seattle, Washington.

== Early life ==
Johnson was born to Jack and Rachell and raised in the Spokane Valley. He attended East Valley High School and majored in broadcasting at the Edward R. Murrow School of Communications at Washington State University. He also played baseball at WSU as a pitcher.

== Career ==
Johnson began his broadcasting career in 1984 at KTVB 7 in Boise, Idaho, serving as the station's weekend sports anchor. Two years later, he was promoted to the role of sports director at rival station KBCI-TV (now KBOI 2). From 1987 to 1989, he served in the same capacity at Spokane's KREM 2, then he moved to sister station KGW 8 in Portland, Oregon, where he remained until 1993.

In 1993, Johnson initially started out as the KOMO 4 station's weekend sports anchor, replacing longtime KOMO sportscaster Rick Meeder and fill-in sports anchor Bob Rondeau. In 1994, Johnson created a popular segment titled "Eric's Little Heroes", which focuses on the athletic plight of Seattle-area children in Little League games across the area, presented in a humorous fashion. In 2006, Eric's Little Heroes was discontinued, until support brought the feature back in early 2008.

In September 1995, longtime KOMO sports director Bruce King retired from broadcasting the eleven o'clock evening sportscasts; Johnson assumed the role of KOMO sports director. In July 1996, King retired from KOMO-TV after a career spanning more than 30 years, and in his retirement, he named Johnson as the new sports director for all weeknight editions of KOMO News 4.

In his 25 years at KOMO, Johnson has been awarded more than 25 Regional Emmy Awards, and in 2007, he was given the highest prize in local television news, a National Edward R. Murrow Award for best feature story in the country. He produced an award-winning documentary about a group of American children who traveled to Cuba to play a series of baseball games against Cuban teams. In 2005, he led coverage of the Seattle Seahawks trip to the Super Bowl. He was seen reporting live when the Mariners, Sonics, or Seahawks were playing.

In the second half of 2006, Johnson began anchoring the news for the first time. He took over the reins of KOMO 4 News at 5 o'clock from longtime news anchor Dan Lewis, when KOMO underwent a broadcast schedule change involving their evening newscast lineup. Lewis anchored the 6 p.m. and 11 p.m. news with Kathi Goertzen (2007–2008), and with Mary Nam (2008–2014). Johnson anchored the 5 p.m. news with Kathi Goertzen (2007–2008), and Mary Nam or Dan Lewis (2008–2012). Johnson anchored the 5 p.m. newscast with Molly Shen, and the 6 p.m. and 11 p.m. newscasts with Mary Nam after his colleague Lewis stepped away from the anchor desk after 27 years in May 2014. His colleague Lewis' son Tim (former weekend sports anchor for KOMO 4) formerly held the role of sports director at KREM 2 from January 2009 – May 2012, the role Johnson held from 1987–1989.

On June 6, 2024, Johnson retired from KOMO News, planning to start a writing career.
