= Paul Deanno =

American meteorologist

Paul Deanno is a Meteorologist for KCBS-TV and KCAL-TV in Los Angeles, CA. Previously, Deanno worked as the Chief Meteorologist for KPIX-TV in San Francisco and also worked as a meteorologist at WMAQ-TV in Chicago, WTVJ in Miami, KOMO-TV in Seattle, KYW-TV in Philadelphia, KENS in San Antonio, KREM (TV) in Spokane, and KDRV in Medford.

== Awards/Accomplishments ==
On June 6, 2015, Deanno won an Emmy Award for Best Weather Anchor in the San Francisco/Northern California Region. This is his fourth Emmy award, having won previously for Best Weather Anchor in the Northwest Region (2010), Hosting A Weather Special Report in Miami (2007) and Best Weather Anchor in the Mid-Atlantic States (2004).

Deanno is the first broadcast meteorologist to have filled-in on all three network morning newscasts: The Today Show, Good Morning America, and CBS This Morning. He has also provided hurricane and severe weather coverage on MSNBC, CNN, The Weather Channel, and NBC Nightly News.

Paul holds the Broadcast Seal Of Approval from The American Meteorological Society (AMS) and the National Weather Association (NWA).

While working in Seattle, KOMO4 Morning News created a forecast specific to a Western Washington School every weekday from September to June. More than 400 schools were featured in Schoolcast's first three years. Deanno visited many of these schools in person.

Paul Deanno is also the author of four children's books about weather. They are: "WOW! Weather!", "WOW! Weather! Hurricanes", "WOW! Weather! Snow", and "¡WOW! El Tiempo". He also contributes regularly to a weather blog called "Weather Whys For Kids".

== Personal information ==
Deanno has been married to his wife, Suzanne, for 20 years. They have three children.
