= Northwest Cable News =

Defunct American news channel

- Country: United States
- Broadcast area: Idaho, Oregon, Washington, Montana (Northwest; other areas), Alaska (Juneau, Dutch Harbor, Sitka, Fairbanks, Hydaburg, Ketchikan, Kodiak, Anchorage and Nome), Northern California
- Headquarters: Seattle, Washington

Programming
- Language: English
- Picture format: 480i (SDTV); 1080i (HDTV)

Ownership
- Owner: Tegna Media
- Sister channels: Seattle, WA: KING-TV, KONG; Portland, OR: KGW; Spokane, WA: KREM, KSKN; Boise, ID: KTVB

History
- Launched: December 18, 1995; 30 years ago
- Closed: January 6, 2017; 9 years ago (21 years, 19 days)

Northwest Cable News (NWCN) was an American cable news television channel owned by Tegna Media. The channel, which launched on December 18, 1995, provided 24-hour rolling news coverage focused primarily on the Pacific Northwest region of the United States (Washington, Oregon, Idaho and northwest Montana). The channel was headquartered out of the studio facilities of Tegna-owned NBC affiliate KING-TV (channel 5) in downtown Seattle. The channel was available to 2.9 million residents (through both cable television and over-the-air) within the region, and, to a lesser extent, Alaska, Northern California, and other areas of Montana.

Some of the network's programming was carried on a sister broadcast station KTVB in Boise, during the overnight hours. From August 28, 2009 to January 20, 2015, it was also aired over the air on their DT3 subchannel, as well as Cable One. It was previously on Cable One until 2003; it was re-added on February 12, 2010. On January 20, 2015, a corporate mandate where Gannett became a charter carrier of the Justice Network meant that it was replaced on KTVB-DT3, and it was carried on Dish Network from April 26, 2011 to February 29, 2016, when it was removed per a mutual decision between the two parties.

On October 28, 2016, Northwest Cable News announced that the channel would shut down on January 6, 2017. Approximately 20 employees were affected, and Tegna offered some of them positions at other Tegna stations. The final program to air on NWCN was a farewell show "Saying Goodbye to NWCN" (which showcased the network's history) at 6:00 p.m. PST. After the credits rolled, NWCN officially signed off for the final time at around 6:59 p.m. following a final turn off of the lights in the network's master control operations, resulting in the channel fading to dark.

== Programming ==
The network incorporated news content purposed from four Tegna-owned stations in the northwestern United States – NBC-affiliated stations KING-TV in Seattle, KGW in Portland, KTVB in Boise and CBS affiliate KREM in Spokane. In addition, the channel maintained content sharing agreements with several other stations.

In addition to rolling news and weather coverage throughout the day, Northwest Cable News produced the nightly sports highlight and discussion program Northwest Sports Tonight (weeknights at 9:00 p.m.) and the call-in shows Gardening with Ciscoe LIVE (which aired Friday evenings at 6:00 p.m.) and Northwest Sports Tonight Game Day (which aired evenings after Seattle Seahawks games during the NFL season). The channel also aired rebroadcasts of sister station KING-TV's lifestyle program Evening each evening at 10:00 p.m. Three other KING-TV programs, Gardening with Ciscoe (a pre-recorded program which the live NWCN program was spun off from), Northwest Backroads and The 5th Quarter (which aired during the NFL season), were also rebroadcast on the channel on weekends. In addition, the channel aired the KGW-produced Sunday evening discussion program Straight Talk. In February 2011, NWCN switched their format from 4:3 to 16:9 aspect ratio. At the time of the channel's shutdown, NWCN was the last news station in the Tegna portfolio that did not air their newscasts in HD (although some of its content has been aired in HD digitally online).

== Notable former staff ==
- Shannon O'Donnell – meteorologist (1995–2001 and 2007–09); now weekend evening meteorologist for KOMO-TV
- Elliott Wiser - News Director (1995-1997); now President and General Manager of WTSP-TV in Tampa, Florida
- Richard Reid - Entertainment Reporter and Movie Critic (1999-2004)
- Rob Piercy - Evening news anchor (2010-2014); now Vice President, Communications & Engagement at Allen Institute
