= KIRO-TV =

Television station in Seattle

- Seattle–Tacoma, Washington; United States
- City: Seattle, Washington
- Channels: Digital: 23 (UHF); Virtual: 7
- Branding: KIRO 7; Telemundo Seattle (7.4)

Programming
- Affiliations: 7.1: CBS; 7.4: Telemundo; for others, see § Subchannels

Ownership
- Owner: Cox Media Group; (KIRO-TV, Inc.)

History
- Founded: April 1955
- First air date: February 8, 1958
- Former channel numbers: Analog: 7 (VHF, 1958–2009); Digital: 39 (UHF, 1999–2019)
- Former affiliations: Primary: UPN (March 1995–June 1997); Secondary: UPN (January–March 1995)
- Call sign meaning: Derived from former sister station KIRO; pronounced like the word "Cairo"

Technical information
- Licensing authority: FCC
- Facility ID: 66781
- ERP: 715 kW
- HAAT: 257 m (843 ft)
- Transmitter coordinates: 47°37′58.9″N 122°21′23.9″W
- Translator(s): see § Translators

Links
- Public license information: Public file; LMS
- Website: www.kiro7.com; telemundoseattle.com

KIRO-TV (channel 7) is a television station in Seattle, Washington, United States, affiliated with CBS and Telemundo. Owned by Cox Media Group, the station maintains studios on Third Avenue in the Belltown section of Downtown Seattle, and its transmitter is located in the city's Queen Anne neighborhood, adjacent to the station's original studios.

KIRO-TV signed on in 1958 as the last commercial VHF television station for the Seattle metropolitan area; owing to its status as the television extension to KIRO (710 AM), the station immediately took the CBS affiliation from Tacoma-licensed KTNT-TV (now KSTW), but they were forced to share the affiliation for two years after the owners of both stations settled a lawsuit over the affiliation switch. Subsequently owned for more than three decades by the broadcasting division of the LDS Church, KIRO-TV briefly became a UPN affiliate when KSTW reaffiliated with CBS in 1995 during a nationwide affiliation shuffle, but rejoined CBS in 1997 via a three-way trade that involved the two stations.

== History ==
=== Early years ===
After KOMO-TV (channel 4) signed on in December 1953, Seattle's channel 7 was the last commercial VHF channel allocation available in the Puget Sound area. As such, its construction permit was heavily contested among several local broadcast interests. Three radio stations—KVI (570 AM), KXA (770 AM, now KTTH) and KIRO (710 AM)—were locked in a battle for the frequency over several years of comparative hearings at the Federal Communications Commission (FCC). Following an initial decision in 1955 and a reaffirmation in 1957, the matter was decided in favor of Queen City Broadcasting, owners of KIRO radio, who signed-on channel 7 on February 8, 1958. Queen City was led by president and general manager Saul Haas, who purchased KIRO radio in 1935 and included U.S. Senator Warren Magnuson and CBS News correspondent Edward R. Murrow amongst its shareholders. The station's original studios were located on Queen Anne Avenue, adjacent to its broadcast tower and directly across the street from KIRO radio. The first program shown on channel 7 was the explosion of Ripple Rock, a hazard to navigation in Seymour Narrows, British Columbia.

KIRO radio had been a CBS Radio affiliate for over 20 years and KIRO-TV subsequently became an affiliate of the CBS television network upon signing on. Channel 7 took the CBS affiliation from Tacoma-licensed KTNT-TV (channel 11, now KSTW) prompting that station's owners at the time, the Tacoma News Tribune to file an antitrust lawsuit accusing CBS of having a standing agreement with KIRO to affiliate with the television network before Queen City's permit to build channel 7 was even approved. In May 1960, KIRO-TV was forced to share CBS with KTNT-TV as part of a settlement reached between the three parties. This arrangement lasted for the next two years with KIRO-TV again becoming the market's exclusive CBS affiliate in September 1962.

==== Sale to LDS Church ====
In April 1963, the Deseret News Publishing Company, the for-profit media arm of the Salt Lake City–based Church of Jesus Christ of Latter-day Saints (LDS Church), began purchasing stock in Queen City Broadcasting starting with a 10 percent share from several minority partners including Sen. Magnuson. Six months later the LDS Church purchased an additional 50 percent, giving them majority control of the KIRO stations. Along with having earned a handsome return on his original investment of 28 years earlier, Saul Hass subsequently joined the board of the LDS Church's broadcasting subsidiary, which was renamed Bonneville International in 1964.

Soon after the FCC approved the sale, Bonneville executives Lloyd Cooney and Kenneth L. Hatch arrived in Seattle to lead the renamed KIRO, Inc. division. Upon Cooney's departure to run for U.S. Senate in 1980, Hatch became president, CEO and chairman, positions he held until 1995. Under Hatch's leadership, KIRO, Inc. (which, in addition to KIRO-AM-FM-TV, would later include KING radio and Third Avenue Productions) became one of the nation's premier regional broadcast groups. KIRO's corporate board included many notable leaders including Mary Maxwell (mother of Bill Gates); Pay 'n Save chairman M. Lamont Bean; Washington Mutual chief executive officer Tony Eyring and Gordon B. Hinckley, a future president of the LDS Church. The KIRO stations moved their offices and studios to "Broadcast House" at Third Avenue and Broad Street in Seattle's Belltown district in 1968, where KIRO-TV remains to this day.

Throughout the late 1960s and early 1970s, KIRO-TV still faced competition in some parts of Western Washington from Bellingham-based KVOS-TV (channel 12), which was also then a CBS affiliate. After years of legal challenges and negotiations with CBS and KIRO-TV, KVOS—at the time owned by Wometco Enterprises—began to phase out most CBS programming by 1980. At age 29 in 1979, John Lippman joined KIRO-TV as news director, and he worked there until 1992. During that time, KIRO staff grew increased from 45 to 100, and KIRO-TV was at or near the top of the ratings in the Seattle market for most of the decade.

KVOS retained a nominal affiliation with CBS until 1987 (KVOS gradually became an independent, and is now a Univision affiliate), during which it would run any CBS network programs that were preempted by channel 7.

=== From CBS to UPN ===
In 1994, CBS found itself without an affiliate in the Dallas–Fort Worth metroplex after KDFW-TV left the network to become a Fox affiliate as a result of the station's owner, New World Communications, signing an affiliation deal with Fox (it later was purchased outright by the network). Consequently, CBS began to negotiate with Gaylord Broadcasting to secure an affiliation agreement with the independent station it had long owned in Fort Worth, KTVT. As part of the deal, CBS would also affiliate with Gaylord-owned independent KSTW in Tacoma; both KSTW and KTVT had been scheduled to affiliate with The WB Television Network (the network would instead pair up with KTZZ-TV [now KZJO] and KDAF, respectively). The deal was announced on September 15, 1994, and CBS programs that had been preempted by KIRO-TV (such as The Bold and the Beautiful) moved to KSTW soon afterward. Other CBS programs such as The Late Late Show with Tom Snyder were shown on KSTW beginning in January 1995, although the show aired an hour later at 1:35 a.m., whereas other CBS affiliates aired the program directly after the Late Show with David Letterman at 12:35 a.m. Even when channel 11 regained the CBS affiliation for the third time in its history in March 1995, the program continued to air at 1:35 a.m.

Two days before the affiliation switch was announced, Bonneville announced that it would sell KIRO-TV to the Belo Corporation, while retaining ownership of KIRO radio. In addition, in anticipation of the affiliation change, Belo stated that it would run channel 7 as a news-intensive independent station. However, on December 6, the station reached an affiliation deal with another then-forthcoming network, UPN.

More changes descended upon channel 7 after Belo took control of the station on January 31, 1995. The station began carrying UPN programming upon its startup on January 16, 1995; however, until CBS moved completely to KSTW on March 13 of that year, UPN programs generally aired on weekend afternoons, though KIRO-TV did preempt CBS programming so that it could air the series premiere of Star Trek: Voyager in prime time.

Local newscasts on channel 7 expanded during this time to nearly 40 hours each week with expansions to its morning and early evening newscasts to compensate for UPN not having national news programs. Outside of UPN's program offerings, the rest of KIRO-TV's schedule was filled with first-run syndicated talk shows, reality shows, off-network dramas, a couple of off-network sitcoms and movies. This format was unusual for a UPN affiliate (but was becoming standard for a Fox affiliate) as most UPN affiliates had a general entertainment format outside of network programming hours. In 1996, Belo acquired the Providence Journal Company, which owned Seattle's NBC affiliate KING-TV (channel 5). Belo could not own both KING-TV and KIRO-TV under FCC rules at the time, and as a result, the company opted to sell KIRO-TV.

=== Rejoining CBS ===
Though there was speculation that Belo would swap KIRO-TV to Fox Television Stations in exchange for KSAZ-TV in Phoenix and KTBC-TV in Austin, Texas, Belo announced on February 20, 1997, that it would swap channel 7 to UPN co-owner Viacom's Paramount Stations Group subsidiary (now part of CBS News and Stations), in exchange for KMOV in St. Louis. At the time, Paramount Stations Group was in the process of selling off the CBS and NBC affiliates that it inherited from Viacom through its 1994 purchase of Paramount Pictures.

Concurrently, Paramount/Viacom traded KIRO-TV to Cox Enterprises in exchange for KSTW, just one month after Cox announced it would acquire that station from Gaylord Broadcasting. The trades were completed on June 2, 1997. The two stations retained their respective syndicated programming, but swapped network affiliations once again—with KSTW becoming a UPN owned-and-operated station, and KIRO-TV regaining its CBS affiliation on June 30, 1997.

In February 2019, it was announced that Apollo Global Management would acquire Cox Media Group and Northwest Broadcasting's stations. The sale gave KIRO-TV in-state sisters in Spokane's KAYU-TV, the Tri-Cities' KFFX-TV, and Yakima's KCYU-LD—all of which are Fox affiliates. Although the group planned to operate under the name Terrier Media, it was later announced in June 2019 that Apollo would also acquire Cox's radio and advertising businesses, and retain the Cox Media Group name. The sale was completed on December 17, 2019. The Fox stations were sold off to Imagicomm Communications in August 2022.

== Programming ==
=== Past programming ===
JP and Gertrude in 2008 tribute.

One of the most famous and longest-running regional children's television programs in the United States, The J. P. Patches Show was produced in-house by KIRO-TV and broadcast steadily from 1958 to 1981. The program starred Chris Wedes as Julius Pierpont Patches, a shabby clown and self-professed mayor of the City Dump and Bob Newman as J. P.'s "girlfriend" Gertrude, in addition to a number of other characters. Nightmare Theatre was KIRO-TV's weekly horror movie series, seen from 1964 to 1978 and hosted by "The Count" (Joe Towey) from 1968 to 1975. Towey, who also directed The J. P. Patches Show, died in 1989.

During the 1970s, KIRO-TV preempted the first half hour of Captain Kangaroo each morning in order to air J. P. Patches. Many parents protested by writing letters to the station because they viewed Captain Kangaroo as being more educationally valuable despite the fact that the children enjoyed J. P. Patches. From 1987 to 1995, under Bonneville ownership, KIRO-TV refused to air The Bold and the Beautiful, which normally aired at 12:30 p.m.; the station aired a 60-minute local newscast from 12 noon to 1 p.m. instead. As a result, the station received many protest letters from fans of the show during that period and even one from the show's creator himself, William J. Bell. The show was cleared when KSTW had CBS for their brief time from 1995 to 1997, and was eventually cleared on KIRO-TV after that station, upon being acquired by Cox, rejoined the CBS network. In 2014, KIRO-TV once again went back to an hour of local news at noon, delaying B&B to 3 p.m., and later 2 p.m. when Let's Make a Deal moved to 9 a.m. On September 10, 2018, KIRO-TV went back to an hour of news at noon. The Bold and the Beautiful stayed at 2 p.m., with Right This Minute moving to 2:30 p.m.

In 1990, KIRO-TV tape-delayed the Daytona 500 by six hours to show a Seattle SuperSonics game as it was the flagship station of the team. The race was won by Derrike Cope (who is a native of nearby Spanaway, Washington) in an upset over Dale Earnhardt in the final lap after a cut tire. Prior to joining UPN in 1995, KIRO-TV ran the CBS Evening News at 6 p.m. between local newscasts at 5 and 6:30 p.m. (The program now airs at 6:30 p.m., the recommended Pacific Time Zone slot for the newscast.)

=== Sports programming ===
KIRO-TV was also the flagship station for pre-season game broadcasts of the Seattle Seahawks from 1976 to 1980. Play-by-play announcers were Gary Justice (1976–78) and Wayne Cody (1979–85), who was also the station's sports anchor. For years, KIRO-TV was the flagship station for Seattle SuperSonics broadcasts, coinciding with the NBA's broadcast contract with CBS that it held from 1973 to 1990, which included the SuperSonics' winning the 1979 NBA Finals. KIRO-TV also carried the Seattle Mariners from 1986 to 1988 as well as in 1992 and again from 1995 to 2000, in addition to any games aired through CBS' MLB contract from 1990 to 1993. KIRO-TV carried the Tacoma Stars (MISL) from 1986 to 1988.

The station also airs Seahawks games (at least two each season) when the team hosts an AFC team at Lumen Field, via the NFL on CBS (it was previously the station where the majority of the team's games aired in 1976 and again from 1998 to 2001), and beginning in 2014, with the institution of the new "cross-flex" broadcast rule, any games in which they play another NFC team (or an AFC team on the road) that are moved from Fox (KCPQ) to CBS.

KIRO-TV's 4th subchannel carried Spanish-language coverage of the 2026 FIFA World Cup, in which Seattle was a host city.

KIRO-TV had also broadcast the Albert Lee Appliance Cup H1 Unlimited hydroplane races on the culminating day of Seattle's Seafair festival. The rights also included coverage of other Seafair events, including the Seafair Summer Fourth Independence Day fireworks on Lake Union (which were brought under the auspices of Seafair in 2013), as well as the Torchlight Parade. In 2017, full-day coverage of the races were discontinued, marking the first time since 1951 that the races were not broadcast live, and the end of a 31-year run of live broadcasts on the station. KIRO cited the costs of producing the telecast as reasoning, and replaced the live broadcast with a 90-minute recap show aired in the evening. In 2018, full-day coverage of all Seafair races returned via Tegna-owned KONG (sister station to KING-TV) in partnership with SWX Right Now. The rights to the Seafair Summer Fourth later moved to KONG, although KIRO continues to broadcast the Torchlight Parade.

=== News operation ===
KIRO-TV presently broadcasts 42 1/2 hours of locally produced newscasts each week (with seven hours each weekday and 3 1/2 hours each on Saturdays and Sundays).

In 1969, KIRO-TV made major upgrades to its news programming, implementing the now-commonplace Eyewitness News format with chief correspondent Clif Kirk, sportscaster Ron Forsell and assistant anchor Sandy Hill, who later left KIRO-TV to become a co-host of Good Morning America. Throughout the 1970s, KIRO-TV was known in Seattle for hiring women in the roles of "assistant anchors" and "weather presenters", including Sandy Hill, Ann Martin, Mikki Flowers and Ann Busch. Throughout the decades, KIRO-TV placed a high emphasis on news programming and investigative stories. During the late 1970s and early 1980s, the Eyewitness News team of anchors John Marler and Gary Justice, meteorologist Harry Wappler and Wayne Cody (and later joined by Susan Hutchison) overtook KING-TV for supremacy in local news.

Beginning in the 1970s, KIRO-TV's newscasts also included op-ed segments prepared by Lloyd R. Cooney. After Cooney left the station in 1980 to pursue an unsuccessful U.S. Senate campaign, the station editorials were handled by a series of commentators: KIRO, Inc. CEO and chairman Ken Hatch, followed by former Seattle City Council member John Miller (later elected as Congressman from Washington's First District) and then by former Seattle Post-Intelligencer editor Louis R. Guzzo. In 1986, KIRO-TV debuted Point Counterpoint featuring conservative John Carlson and liberal Walt Crowley; the segment aired on what was then KIRO-TV's most popular newscast, The Sunday Newshour with Crowley and Carlson becoming well known for their pointed and bombastic debates.

In late 1979, KIRO-TV began renting a helicopter for newsgathering; it was the second station in the Seattle market to use one after KING-TV, which had used them since the 1950s. Shortly afterward, KIRO-TV took delivery on a Bell 206 (registration N5735A) in June 1980, branding its news coverage as "Chopper 7". By 1984, the station had added another helicopter; it then became one of the first stations in the United States to use a jet aircraft for newsgathering when introduced a Learjet 24 named the "Newsjet" on May 2. By 2009, KIRO-TV was using a Bell 407 in its operations.

In 1990, KIRO-TV became one of the first television stations in the United States to expand its weekday morning newscast into the 4:30 a.m. timeslot—long before it started to become commonplace nationwide in the late 2000s and 2010s (at the time, most news-producing stations started their morning news programs at 6 or 6:30 a.m., with many not expanding into earlier timeslots until as early as the mid-1990s); the program eventually reverted to a 5:30 a.m. start by 1993. Also during this time period, KIRO began producing a 10 p.m. newscast for local independent station KTZZ (currently KZJO); a simulcast of KIRO radio's morning drive program was added to KTZZ in 1993. The 10 p.m. newscast was dropped in September 1993.

By the early 1990s, the well-worn, "happy talk" format faltered and KING-TV's newscasts had overtaken KIRO-TV in the local news ratings, leading to a major restructuring of its news department. In June 1992, the station merged its news department with that of KIRO radio, under its news director Andy Ludlum. Seeking to differentiate itself from its competitors, station president Ken Hatch oversaw a major revamp of KIRO-TV's newscasts that launched on February 4, 1993, which the station billed as "news outside of the box". Robert Bovill designed an open newsroom set, which synergized the radio and television staff as the "KIRO News Network", and included a rotating, three-section platform for studio interviews, with walls meant to resemble Mount Rainier; the "command center" in the center of the area contained a nine-screen video wall, and an assignment desk designed to resemble a ferryboat. The Seattle Symphony recorded new theme music, and Pacific Northwest Ballet co-artistic director Kent Stowell coached the anchors in the art of walking toward a moving camera while simultaneously delivering the news.

The format was widely panned; viewers quickly complained they were distracted by the moving anchors, the constant buzz of assignment editors in the background of newscasts and periodic "visits" into the KIRO radio studios. The television reporters' primary assets were lost on radio listeners, while many of the radio reporters were clearly uncomfortable on camera. The original concept also called for live airing of raw, unedited field tape, which only called attention to the importance of proper news editing. In addition, KOMO-TV and KING-TV were fighting for first place in the Seattle market; the latter station's local sketch comedy show, Almost Live!, took potshots at KIRO's news format the week of the debut. Even KIRO's own employees were not enthused about it; one unidentified reporter was quoted as saying "All of this is being done for cosmetics. It's all superficial garbage. There's been no effort to improve substance. But it's like the emperor's new clothes: You can't question it." Attempts were made to salvage the format, including using tighter camera angles.

By September 1993, after veteran anchor Susan Hutchison threatened to leave the station, Ludlum and other backers of the idea had either left or been fired. Under new news director Bill Lord, the station returned to a more conventional format as KIRO NewsChannel 7; his colleagues applauded a promise to "nail the anchors' shoes to the floor". The station ultimately returned to Eyewitness News (with a new graphics set and logo based on sister station WHIO-TV in Dayton, Ohio) when Cox purchased the station and concurrent to its return to CBS in 1997. During the station's UPN affiliation, the station launched additional newscasts to replace CBS programming in time periods not programmed by UPN, including a two-hour morning newscast extension from 7 to 9 a.m. and an hour of news at 10 p.m. Beginning in March 2003, the station would once again produce a 10 p.m. newscast for another station, this time for KSTW (whose own news department had been shuttered in 1998, shortly after the affiliation swap between KSTW and KIRO had been reversed); the newscast was canceled on December 19, 2003, and returned on June 28, 2004, before being canceled permanently in June 2005; news would not return to KSTW until 2022. On October 3, 2015, KIRO-TV introduced a new set, refreshed logo, and dropped the Eyewitness News title again, this time in favor of KIRO 7 News.

==== Notable former on-air staff ====
- Aaron Brown
- Wayne Cody – sports anchor
- Linda Cohn
- Sandy Hill (1969–1974)
- Susan Hutchison – anchor (1979–2001)
- Neal Karlinsky – reporter
- David Kerley – anchor/reporter
- Ann Martin (1969–1976)
- Rob Mayeda – meteorologist
- Steve Raible – news anchor
- Alison Starling – anchor/reporter
- Jack Williams – anchor
- Brian Wood – anchor/reporter
- Janet Wu – anchor

== Technical information ==
=== Subchannels ===
The station's signal is multiplexed:

Subchannels of KIRO-TV
Subchannel	Res.	Short name	Programming
7.1	1080i	KIRO 7	CBS
7.2	480i	COZI	Cozi TV
7.3	480i	LAFF	Laff
7.4	480i	TELEMU	Telemundo
51.2	480i	ROAR	Roar (KUNS-TV)
51.3	480i	TheNest	The Nest (KUNS-TV)

Broadcast on behalf of another station

=== Analog-to-digital conversion ===
KIRO-TV shut down its analog signal, over VHF channel 7, on June 12, 2009, as part of the federally mandated transition from analog to digital television. The station's digital signal remained on its pre-transition UHF channel 39, using virtual channel 7.

=== Translators ===
KIRO-TV is rebroadcast on the following translator stations:

- K26IC-D Bremerton
- K26OZ-D Everett
- K18NI-D Point Pulley
- K18NH-D Puyallup

== Out of market coverage ==
KIRO-TV is one of five local Seattle television stations seen in Canada via Shaw Broadcast Services and Telus Optik TV for the purposes of time-shifting and can be viewed from many eastern Canadian cities including Toronto and Montreal and on satellite providers Bell Satellite TV and Shaw Direct. It can also been seen on cable systems in British Columbia as the quasi-local CBS affiliate. Some programs, such as Let's Make a Deal and KIRO 7 News at Noon, are replaced on the station's alternate feed for Canadian viewers with infomercials. Additionally, KIRO-TV is carried via cable alongside KING-TV in The Bahamas.
