= KFMY =

KFMY may refer to:

- Page Field (ICAO code KFMY)
- KFMY-LD, a low-power television station (channel 6) licensed to serve Petaluma, California, United States
- KJZT-LP, a defunct low-power radio station (107.9 FM) formerly licensed to serve Tulsa, Oklahoma, United States, which held the call sign KFMY-LP from 2010 to 2014
- KNWN-FM, a radio station (97.7 FM) licensed to serve Oakville, Washington, United States, which held the call sign KFMY from 1999 to 2009
