= Mike Siegel =

American radio talk show host

- Born: Michael Siegel; March 16, 1945 (age 80); Brooklyn, New York
- Occupation: Radio talk show host
- Known for: Coast to Coast AM

Mike Siegel (born March 16, 1945) is an American radio talk show host. Siegel is a native of New York. He has worked hosted the nationally syndicated radio program Coast to Coast AM, and worked at stations from Seattle's KVI to Boston's WRKO and hosted a webcast. He has substituted for nationally syndicated conservative talk show hosts, including Michael Reagan.

== Shows ==
Siegel was the host of the late-night talk show Coast to Coast AM from April 2000 until January 2001. He became a frequent substitute of the show's host, Art Bell in late 1999, and when Bell announced his retirement in early 2000, he recommended Siegel to succeed him. Siegel maintained the format of the show that Art Bell had created, but his personal style was very different, and the show became less popular. Early in 2001, Bell decided to return, and Siegel left the show. Siegel hosted the show from Seattle, Washington, where he lived.

Later, Siegel hosted a daily talk show on WLIE, in Islip, Long Island. During this tenure, he promoted the movement to make Long Island the 51st state (with himself as its first Governor), and advocated "smoke-ins" to protest the county's smoking ban.

Siegel was the host of first a conservative noon-time to three pm talk show on KVI in Seattle, Washington; followed by a move to morning drive, on KTTH in Seattle, Washington. He was key in movements of the time to introduce accountability to Washington state government. He helped former Congresswoman Linda Smith and initiative to the people "King" Tim Eyman to get motor vehicle license fees reduced from 2.2% of the vehicle's value to $30 a year.

Siegel describes how he worried about his safety when he aired a discussion from Wenatchee, Washington involving some of those accused in the Wenatchee child abuse prosecutions.

In early December 2005, his contract with KTTH expired and he was replaced by David Boze and Dan Sytman in the morning.

On February 1, 2006, Siegel began hosting "Noonday" on WDAY in Fargo, North Dakota. He was replaced by other hosts, but continued as a regular substitute for WDAY general manager Scott Hennen on the Hot Talk program.

In June, 2006, Siegel was the host of a one-hour local issues radio show from 6-7 PM (Pacific) on KITZ in Bremerton Washington and KGTK in Olympia.

In April 2008, Hennen left WDAY to become owner of his own station, WZFG/1100. Upon Hennen's departure, Siegel served as host of Hot Talk on WDAY until June 2008. Siegel followed Hennen to AM 1100 and was a regular fill-in host for the Scott Hennen Show.

Siegel worked the 3-7 PM time-slot on WRKO-AM 680 in Boston, Massachusetts, beginning in September 2014, when the contract with The Howie Carr Show ended. This assignment ended on March 16, 2015, when Carr returned. Siegel started a nightly talk show on WRKO from 10 p.m. to 1 a.m. on July 30, 2018.

== Appearances and honors ==
- He was professor of communication at Emerson College (Boston) and Fitchburg State College (Fitchburg, Massachusetts).
- He was a guest on Geraldo in a discussion during a proposed 51% pay raise for members of Congress.
- He was a guest on Bill Maher's Politically Incorrect (January 2000) along with Actress Carol Alt and Rap Artist/Actor Ice Cube.
- He appeared on Court TV on KIRO (January 2000), breaking the story of Jeff Smith, the Frugal Gourmet and accused pedophile.
- He was recognized by Talkers Magazine as one of the 100 Most Important Talk Hosts in America.
- He began a weekday internet radio show on Cameo Entertainment Groups' CyberStationUSA.Com, on February 1, 2010, at 3:00 pm EST.
- In 2017, he began hosting Your Second Opinion, a podcast produced by the news and public policy group Haym Salomon Center.
- He authors a book Airing the Wave: Talk Radio At The Dawn Of The Digital Era.
