= Neal Karlinsky =

American journalist

- Born: Neal A. Karlinsky; October 14, 1968 (age 57); Detroit, Michigan, U.S.
- Education: Michigan State University
- Years active: 1990–present
- Known for: Correspondent for ABC News
- Spouse: Malia

Neal A. Karlinsky (born October 14, 1968) was the Seattle correspondent for ABC News. He has been nominated twice for the 30th and 32nd News & Documentary Emmy Award in the Outstanding Continuing Coverage of a News Story category. Karlinsky received a nomination, in the Television Segment category at the 2012 James Beard Awards, where he hosted a cooking segment with John Berman, on Nightline.

He is now a Storyteller for Amazon.

== Early life and education ==
Karlinsky was born, on October 14, 1968, in Detroit, Michigan, the son of Arnold and Vivian Karlinsky (née, Monarch), and he was raised with a brother, Paul, and a sister, Deborah. He obtained his baccalaureate from Michigan State University in journalism.

== Career ==
He started his journalism career at WLNS-TV in Lansing, Michigan, where he would eventually move to Nashville, Tennessee to WKRN-TV, while finally landing at KIRO-TV in Seattle, Washington. In August 2000, Karlinsky joined ABC News as a Seattle-based correspondent, where he has covered the 2008 Sichuan earthquake, garnering him a nomination at the News & Documentary Emmy Award, for Outstanding Continuing Coverage of a News Story. This ongoing story appeared on ABC World News Tonight. John Berman and Karlinsky received a nomination for a cooking segment on Nightline, at the 2012 James Beard Awards, in the Television Segment category.

== Personal life ==
He is married to Malia Karlinsky, an Emmy award winning Lifestyle Reporter and Producer at KOMO-TV, the ABC affiliate in Seattle. They have two children.
