= Janet Wu =

American television personality

- Born: Texas
- Education: Yale University (B.A., Psychology and Philosophy, 1988); Columbia University (M.A., Journalism and International Affairs)
- Occupations: Anchor, journalist, teacher
- Employer: Bloomberg News
- Website: janetwu.com

Janet Wu is an American TV presenter, journalist and teacher.

Until November 2015, she had been a general assignment reporter and fill-in presenter for WHDH-TV (Channel 7), NBC's Boston affiliate, and had worked for them for 17 years.

In 2018 she became an anchor/reporter for Bloomberg News.

== Early life and education ==
Wu, who was born in Texas and raised in Miami, Florida, received her bachelor's degree in psychology and philosophy from Yale University. She earned a master's degree at Columbia University in Journalism and International Affairs.

== Career ==
Before joining WHDH-TV in 1996, Wu was the weekday morning presenter for KIRO-TV in Seattle. Before that, she was the weekend presenter and reporter at KGMB in Honolulu, Hawaii. She also made a cameo appearance in the film Free Willy 2: The Adventure Home. During college, she had worked for WFSB in Hartford, Connecticut.

A published essayist and op-ed contributor, Wu speaks English, Mandarin Chinese and Spanish. Her essay "Homeward Bound" was published in The New York Times and appears in expository writing texts including The Norton Sampler and Evergreen: A Guide to Writing with Readings. In June 2012, she wrote an essay which was published in The Boston Globe entitled "Marina Keegan and the gift of time" reflecting on the tragic untimely death of 2012 Yale graduate Marina Keegan.

In November 2015, she left WHDH-TV to continue her charity work and to teach at Emerson College.

In April 2018, she took a job with Bloomberg as an anchor/reporter. For Bloomberg, Wu primarily interviews entrepreneurs, investors, and business leaders, primarily for “Bloomberg Baystate Business.”

Wu was named in 2022 as a member of the Council on Strategic Risks.

She also regularly hosts events with the Boston Symphony; Wu is an accomplished cellist and pianist.

== Publications ==
- Fawcett, Susan. Evergreen: A Guide to Writing with Readings, 8th Edition. CENGAGE Learning, 2007. (Janet Wu essay, "Homeward Bound")
- Cooley, Thomas (Editor). The Norton Sampler: Short Essays for Composition. W. W. Norton & Company, 2010. (Janet Wu essay, "Homeward Bound")
- Wu, Janet. "Homeward Bound", The New York Times, September 5, 1999.
- Wu, Janet. "Identity Crisis", Charles River Review, Harvard University, Fall 1999.
- Wu, Janet; Tarsy, Andrew. "Dith Pran: Two views of a legend", The Boston Globe, March 23, 2008.
- Wu, Janet, "Marina Keegan and the gift of time", The Boston Globe, June 1, 2012
