= KPLZ-FM =

Classic country radio station in Seattle

Coordinates: 47.544°N 122.108°W

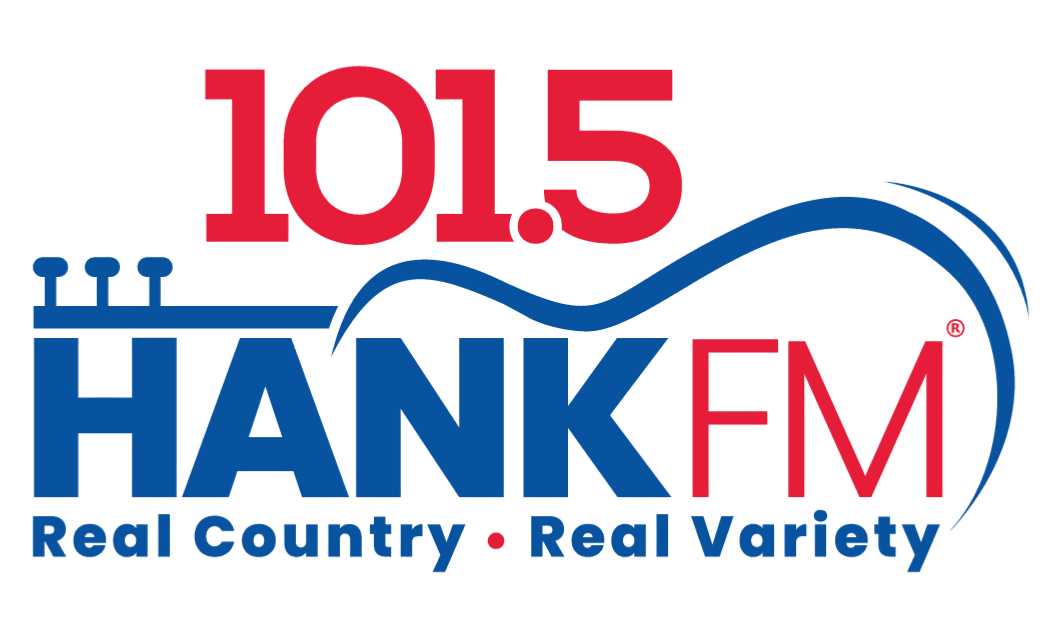
- Seattle, Washington; United States
- Broadcast area: Seattle-Tacoma metropolitan area
- Frequency: 101.5 MHz (HD Radio)
- Branding: 101.5 Hank FM

Programming
- Language: English
- Format: Classic country
- Subchannels: HD2: KNWN; HD3: KVI

Ownership
- Owner: Lotus Communications; (Lotus Seattle Corp.)
- Sister stations: KNWN; KNWN-FM; KVI

History
- First air date: September 1, 1959
- Former call signs: KETO (1959–1976); KVI-FM (1976–1978)
- Call sign meaning: Former "K-Plus" branding

Technical information
- Licensing authority: FCC
- Facility ID: 21663
- Class: C0
- ERP: 99,000 watts; 100,000 watts with beam tilt
- HAAT: 372 meters (1,220 ft)

Links
- Public license information: Public file; LMS
- Webcast: Listen live
- Website: crankthehankseattle.com

KPLZ-FM (101.5 FM) is a commercial radio station licensed to Seattle, Washington, United States. Owned by Lotus Communications, it airs a classic country music format branded "101.5 Hank FM". The studios are co-located with former sister station KOMO-TV within KOMO Plaza (formerly Fisher Plaza) in the Lower Queen Anne section of Seattle, directly across the street from the Space Needle.

The transmitter is located on Cougar Mountain in Issaquah. KPLZ broadcasts using HD Radio technology: the HD2 digital subchannel simulcasts KNWN, and the HD3 subchannel simulcasts KVI.

== History ==
=== Easy listening (1959–1970) ===
On September 1, 1959, the station signed on the air as KETO-FM. It was owned by Chem-Air, Inc. and featured an easy listening format. Its effective radiated power was 10,000 watts.

The 1960 edition of "Broadcasting Yearbook" showed an advertisement for KETO-FM as "Your key to good listening". A sketch of a pelican was included in the ad, wearing headphones and holding a key (for KEY-to). However, in the 1960s, few people owned FM radios and the audience was limited.

=== Country (1974–1976) ===
By 1970, KETO-FM had increased its power to 100,000 watts. It adopted a country music format in April 1974, competing against juggernaut KAYO (1150 AM, now KKNW) for country music listeners.

=== Top 40 (1976–1981) ===
In 1976, Seattle hosted a two-station CHR/Top 40 ratings battle between KING and KJR. Golden West Broadcasters, owned by entertainer Gene Autry, bought KETO-FM in 1976. Golden West already owned KVI, which had a popular middle of the road/adult contemporary format. Management decided to switch the FM station's call sign to KVI-FM, calling it "The FM KVI", and wanted to give it a younger sound to complement the AM station. KVI-FM flipped to a Top 40 format, becoming the company's first station with the format. The first song under the new format was "Beginnings" by Chicago. KVI-FM's first program director was Frank Colbourn, who relocated to Seattle from Monterey, California, to sign-on the new format.

The new format quickly became popular as AM music stations began to lose some of its audience to the FM band. Colbourn earned the station twelve gold records from artists such as Stevie Wonder, Exile, and Donna Summer. However, there was some confusion between KVI (which had switched to a talk format), and its Golden West sister station, KVI-FM. In 1978, KVI-FM became "K-Plus 101" and changed its call letters to KPLZ.

In the late 1970s, while KJR and KING maintained mainstream Top-40 formats, "K-Plus" became the area's de facto disco music station for a couple of years, airing a higher percentage of dance hits than the AM Top 40 stations.

=== Adult contemporary (1981–1983) ===
The death of disco, combined with the 1981 sign-on of Top-40 upstart KBLE-FM, which later became KUBE, signaled a tough ratings environment for KPLZ in the early 1980s.

In response, KPLZ moved slightly towards an adult contemporary format, using the slogan "The Music Magazine" and branding as simply "KPLZ". However, under the leadership of Program Director Jeff King, and later Casey Keating, the station was in a close race in the ratings with KUBE for Top 40 supremacy during the 1980s.

=== Top 40 (1983–1994) ===
The station moved back to mainstream Top 40 on September 5, 1983, changing its slogan to "Hot Hits" K-plus FM. It began using a Hot Hits jingle package and formatics developed by Mike Joseph, who created the Hot Hits format, adopted by numerous radio stations in the early 1980s. KPLZ later changed its moniker to "Z 101.5", before moving back to "101.5 KPLZ" in the late 1980s. During its "Z 101.5" days, KPLZ was an affiliate of Rick Dees Weekly Top 40.

Meanwhile, KUBE struggled for a time, but ultimately adopted a rhythmic contemporary approach in early 1992. During this time, KPLZ's ratings dropped while KUBE ascended the ratings ladder. KPLZ tried various angles of the format, such as counteracting KUBE's rhythmic direction with a more mainstream CHR direction, as well as emphasizing hits from the previous five years. When that strategy didn't work, KPLZ began playing more rhythmic titles by January 1993.

Fisher Communications bought the station in 1994.

=== Hot adult contemporary (1994–2024) ===
Final logo as Star, 2020-2024

On January 14, 1994, at noon, KPLZ finally gave up on Top 40 and flipped to hot adult contemporary as "Star 101.5". The first song on "Star" was "Waiting for a Star to Fall" by Seattle duo Boy Meets Girl. Kent Phillips and Alan Budwill, who had hosted mornings on the station since 1986, remained after the flip to "Star" and continued until December 2018, when Budwill retired and Phillips moved to afternoons; mornings would then be hosted by Curt Kruse and Corine McKenzie and producer Leonard Barokas until they were let go from the station in March 2021.

On April 11, 2013, Fisher Communications announced that it would sell its properties, including KPLZ-FM, to the Sinclair Broadcast Group. Fisher owned radio stations in Seattle and in Great Falls, Montana, as well as TV stations in Washington, Oregon, Idaho, California and other markets.

Although Sinclair primarily owns television stations, the company said it would retain KPLZ, talk radio KVI, all-news radio KOMO and continued to lease KOMO-FM as a simulcast of KOMO (AM) (KOMO-FM would be purchased outright by Sinclair in June 2020). The deal was completed on August 8.

On June 3, 2021, Sinclair announced they would sell KPLZ, KVI and KOMO-AM-FM to Lotus Communications for $18 million. Sinclair retained KOMO-TV. The sale was completed on September 28.

=== Classic country (2024-present) ===
On April 1, 2024, Lotus announced that KPLZ would drop the Star branding and Hot AC format after 30 years at 2 p.m. that day. At that time, after playing "Good Riddance (Time of Your Life)" by Green Day, the station flipped to a gold-leaning country music format as 101.5 Hank FM; the flip came as the station carried just a 2.1 share in the January 2024 Nielsen Audio market ratings. In anticipation and retaliation, KPNW-FM returned to country itself four hours prior. Both KPLZ and KPNW now compete against KKWF, which had a 7.1 share in those same ratings, ranking second in the market.

=== Christmas music ===
KPLZ, under its run as "Star", spent the latter part of each year playing an all-Christmas music format. In 2016, the station briefly rebranded as "Santa FM", which sparked rumors of a format change or rebranding away from the "Star" name after the holiday season. However, at midnight on December 26, KPLZ returned to its hot AC format and the "Star" branding, but adjusted its playlist to include some additional gold/recurrent songs from the 1980s, 1990s, and 2000s.
