= KUNS-TV =

Television station in Bellevue, Washington

ATSC 3.0 station
- Bellevue–Seattle–Tacoma, Washington; United States
- City: Bellevue, Washington
- Channels: Digital: 24 (UHF); Virtual: 51
- Branding: The CW ARC Seattle

Programming
- Affiliations: 51.1: The CW; for others, see § Subchannels

Ownership
- Owner: Sinclair Broadcast Group; (Sinclair Seattle Licensee, LLC)
- Sister stations: KOMO-TV

History
- First air date: August 8, 1999
- Former call signs: KBEH (1999–2000); KWOG (2000–2006)
- Former channel numbers: Analog: 51 (UHF, 1999–2009); Digital: 50 (UHF, until 2019)
- Former affiliations: ValueVision/ShopNBC (1999–2006); Univision (2006–2024)
- Call sign meaning: "Univision Seattle" (former affiliation)

Technical information
- Licensing authority: FCC
- Facility ID: 4624
- ERP: 625 kW
- HAAT: 237 m (778 ft)
- Transmitter coordinates: 47°37′55″N 122°21′14″W

Links
- Public license information: Public file; LMS

KUNS-TV (channel 51) is a television station licensed to Bellevue, Washington, United States, serving the Seattle area as an affiliate of The CW. It is owned by Sinclair Broadcast Group alongside ABC affiliate KOMO-TV (channel 4). The two stations share studios within KOMO Plaza (formerly Fisher Plaza) in the Lower Queen Anne section of Seattle; KUNS-TV's transmitter is located in the city's Queen Anne neighborhood.

== History ==
KUNS's logo from January 29, 2019, through January 1, 2024

On February 10, 1988, the Federal Communications Commission (FCC) issued a construction permit for television station KBEH. However, channel 51 did not begin its broadcasting operation until August 8, 1999, transmitting programs from the ValueVision network, which became ShopNBC in 2001 after NBC (now part of Comcast) acquired a 37% ownership stake in that network. In December 2000, the station changed its call letters to KWOG.

Previously owned by African-American Broadcasting of Bellevue, KWOG was sold to Fisher Communications on September 29, 2006. On October 31, 2006, the station changed its call letters one more time, this time to the current KUNS-TV. On January 1, 2007, it began the year by shifting from broadcasting home shopping programs to broadcasting Hispanic programming as a Univision affiliate almost instantly, providing viewers with programs such as Sabado Gigante, Despierta América and El Gordo y La Flaca, in addition to an assortment of telenovelas, along with many other programs. The station also started its own local newscast, Noticias Noroeste with Jaime Méndez and Roxy de la Torre. The newscast originated from a studio at KOMO Plaza (formerly Fisher Plaza) in Seattle.

On August 21, 2012, Fisher Communications signed an affiliation agreement with MundoFox, a Spanish-language competitor to Univision that was owned as a joint venture between Fox International Channels and Colombian broadcaster RCN TV, for KUNS and Portland sister station KUNP to be carried on both stations as digital subchannels starting in late September. On April 11, 2013, Fisher announced that it would sell its properties, including KUNS-TV, to the Sinclair Broadcast Group. The deal was completed on August 8, 2013.

On May 8, 2017, Sinclair Broadcast Group entered into an agreement to acquire Tribune Media—owner of Fox affiliate KCPQ (channel 13) and MyNetworkTV affiliate KZJO (channel 22)—for $3.9 billion, plus the assumption of $2.7 billion in debt held by Tribune, pending regulatory approval by the FCC and the U.S. Department of Justice's Antitrust Division; the merger would have required divestitures in the Seattle market, as broadcasters at the time were not allowed to legally own more than two full-power television stations in a single market. On April 24, 2018, Sinclair disclosed that it would buy KZJO and sell KUNS-TV to Howard Stirk Holdings, while continuing to provide services to the station; KCPQ would concurrently be sold to Fox Television Stations, which would make KCPQ a Fox owned-and-operated station.

Three weeks after the FCC's July 18 vote to have the deal reviewed by an administrative law judge amid "serious concerns" about Sinclair's forthrightness in its applications to sell certain conflict properties, on August 9, 2018, Tribune announced it would terminate the Sinclair deal, intending to seek other M&A opportunities. Tribune also filed a breach of contract lawsuit in the Delaware Chancery Court, alleging that Sinclair engaged in protracted negotiations with the FCC and the U.S. Department of Justice's Antitrust Division over regulatory issues, refused to sell stations in markets where it already had properties, and proposed divestitures to parties with ties to Sinclair executive chair David D. Smith that were rejected or highly subject to rejection to maintain control over stations it was required to sell. The termination of the Sinclair sale agreement places uncertainty for the future of Fox's purchases of KCPQ and the other six Tribune stations included in that deal, which were predicated on the closure of the Sinclair–Tribune merger.

On October 11, 2023, it was reported that KUNS-TV would become the Seattle market's new affiliate of The CW effective January 1, 2024, replacing KOMO-DT2, which reverted to a full-time affiliation with the Sinclair-owned diginet Comet. The move was controversial within the local Hispanic community as it implied the discontinuation of the only local Spanish-language newscast in Western Washington; Sinclair did not confirm the discontinuation of Spanish-language content in general on KUNS until nearly a month later, having offered Univision a subchannel position that the network declined. KUNS aired its last such newscast on December 31, with Bellingham-based KVOS-TV (channel 12) assuming the Univision affiliation the following day; former co-anchor Jaime Méndez started streaming his own newscast from his Lynnwood home on January 5, 2024, in response to the move.

When it switched to The CW, rather than any associated CW branding, Sinclair instead rebranded KUNS-TV as "ARC Seattle", with "ARC" stylized in small letters and standing for "authentic, relatable, community". Alongside the rebranding, the station also launched a lifestyle-oriented morning news program also titled ARC Seattle.

In March 2025, the Seattle Storm of the WNBA announced an agreement to air 33 regional games on KUNS in the 2025 season; select games would also be simulcast by KOMO.

== Technical information ==
=== Subchannels ===
The station's ATSC 1.0 channels are carried on the multiplexed signals of other Seattle television stations:

Subchannels provided by KUNS-TV (ATSC 1.0)
Subchannel	Res.	Short name	Programming	ATSC 1.0 host
51.1	1080i	KUNS	The CW	KOMO-TV
51.2	480i	ROAR	Roar/Rip City Television Network	KIRO-TV
51.3	480i	TheNest	The Nest	KIRO-TV

On September 23, 2024, the Portland Trail Blazers announced an agreement with Sinclair to launch Rip City Television Network, which syndicates games over-the-air. Games in Seattle air on KUNS-TV's second subchannel.

=== Analog-to-digital conversion ===
KUNS-TV shut down its analog signal, over UHF channel 51, on June 12, 2009, as part of the federally mandated transition from analog to digital television. The station's digital signal remained on its pre-transition UHF channel 50, using virtual channel 51.

=== ATSC 3.0 ===
Subchannels of KUNS-TV (ATSC 3.0)
Subchannel	Res.	Short name	Programming
4.1	720p	KOMO	ABC (KOMO-TV)
4.10	1080p	T2	T2
4.11	1080p	PBTV	Pickleballtv
4.20		GMLOOP	Gameloop TV
4.21		ROXi	ROXi
7.1	1080p	KIRO	CBS (KIRO-TV)
28.11	1080p	KBTC-VC	PBS (KBTC-TV)
51.1	1080p	KUNS	The CW

Subchannel streamed via the Internet
