= KTTO =

Catholic radio station in Spokane, Washington

- Spokane, Washington; United States
- Broadcast area: Spokane metropolitan area
- Frequency: 970 kHz
- Branding: Sacred Heart Radio

Programming
- Format: Catholic radio
- Affiliations: EWTN Radio

Ownership
- Owner: Sacred Heart Radio, Inc.

History
- First air date: January 18, 1947
- Former call signs: KREM (1947–1985); KZZU (1985–1987); KHIT (1987–1988); KTRW (1988–2005)

Technical information
- Licensing authority: FCC
- Facility ID: 38492
- Class: B
- Power: 5,300 watts day; 750 watts night
- Transmitter coordinates: 47°36′57.6″N 117°21′58.8″W
- Translator: 106.1 K291CO (Spokane)

Links
- Public license information: Public file; LMS
- Webcast: Listen live
- Website: sacredheartradio.org

KTTO (970 kHz) is an AM radio station in Spokane, Washington, serving the Spokane metropolitan area. The station is currently owned by Sacred Heart Radio, Inc. It airs a Catholic radio format with most programming provided by the EWTN Radio Network.

KTTO's transmitter is located off East Thurston Avenue in Spokane. Programming is also heard on FM translator station K291CO, powered at 155 watts, broadcasting at 106.1 MHz.

== History ==
The station first signed on as KREM in January 18, 1947. It originally broadcast at 1340 kHz, at a power of 250 watts. KREM was owned by Cole E. Wylie, who served as president and general manager. By the 1950s, it had moved to its current spot on the dial, AM 970, powered at 5,000 watts by day, 1,000 watts at night.

In 1955, it put Spokane's first FM station on the air, 92.9 KREM-FM (now KZZU-FM). They were joined by KREM-TV in 1954. In the 1950s and 1960s, when few people owned FM radios, KREM-FM simulcast the AM station's programming. In 1957, KREM-AM-FM-TV were acquired by Seattle-based King Broadcasting Company. In the 1960s, KREM became a Top 40 station, vying with KJRB for Spokane's young radio listeners. KREM-FM switched to a progressive rock sound in the late 1960s.

On October 16, 1987, the station changed its call sign to KHIT, playing hits of the 1950s, 1960s and 1970s. On February 22, 1988, it became KTRW, playing country music. The KTRW call letters are now on a Christian radio station at AM 630. On September 29, 2005, it switched to the current KTTO.

On November 20, 2015, the Federal Communications Commission granted KTTO a construction permit to increase daytime power to 5,300 watts and decrease nighttime power to 750 watts. In 2017, KTTO added an FM translator at 106.1 MHz.
