= Nightmare Theatre =

- Genre: Horror
- Created by: Joe Towey
- Starring: Joe Towey
- No. of seasons: 15

Original release
- Network: KIRO
- Release: September 25, 1964 – October 31, 1978

Nightmare Theatre was one of the more prominent late-night horror programs of the 1960s and 1970s. During its fourteen-year run, this show introduced several generations of television viewers to the horror films of yesteryear, across the Pacific Northwest. Produced by Seattle-based KIRO-TV, and utilizing much of the same cast and crew as the similarly popular The J.P. Patches Show, Nightmare Theatre reached an audience that stretched as far north as Alaska, as far east as Idaho, and south into Oregon, as well as Canada. Its residential horror host, The Count, has accrued a cult following over the years, much in the same vein as his make-up laden peers Maila Nurmi ("Vampira"), John Zacherle ("Zacherley"), and Cassandra Peterson ("Elvira"). A revival premiered in 2019 for Pensacola, Florida station WSRE .

== Early history ==
Late night horror programs had become immensely popular during the 1960s, so KIRO-TV decided to tap into a market virtually untouched by the Pacific Northwest stations at the time. Nightmare Theatre was conceptualized by Joe Towey, who not only functioned as the director of The J.P. Patches Show for its entire twenty-three years, but who also played a host of characters on the long-running children's program. (Just a few of his recurring characters include the klutzy handyman Mal Content, and J.P. Patches' evil twin brother, I.M. Rags.)

Nightmare Theatre debuted on September 25, 1964, with the 1958 low budget shocker The Screaming Skull. By April 1965, the program began playing double-bills which stretched into the early morning hours. The show proved popular among children and teenagers, but it found a ratings booster when it introduced its mascot a few years later. The Count (played by Towey) didn't actually appear in front of the camera until Halloween of 1968, but the character proved an instant success with viewers lucky enough to be able to tune in. Nightmare Theatre aired every Friday night on Channel 7 in the 11:30 pm time slot for most of its run, but was aired progressively later during the 1970s. KIRO-TV attempted to phase out the program on several occasions, but audience pressure forced them to revive it time and again.

== Opening Sequence ==
For most of its run, the late-night program opened with a shot of a mist-shrouded castle (in actuality, an Alexander Brand HO scale Haunted House, accompanied by sound effects borrowed from Walt Disney's Chilling, Thrilling Sounds of the Haunted House and music pilfered from Neal Hefti's score for the 1966 Roddy McDowall film Lord Love a Duck. Within its mouldering recesses, the camera settled onto a coffin, which opened to reveal a skeleton. A clever camera fade transformed the bones into The Count, a dime-store Dracula whose shtick was worse than his bite. (A fallible bloodsucker, any attempts to frighten his younger viewers would be undermined by such antics as slamming his fingers beneath his coffin lid.) Armed with a battery of bad puns and a mock Transylvanian accent, The Count would introduce double-features that usually consisted of low-budget horror and science-fiction fare, although occasionally it would be padded out by poverty-row thrillers from the 1930s and 1940s. During its leaner years, only a single film was aired, usually a tiring re-run which regular fans had already seen far too many times. KIRO-TV had one of the largest libraries of old films at its disposal, including all of the classic Universal monster movies, which they showed with some regularity.

== The End of Nightmare Theatre ==
KIRO-TV and The Count found themselves facing competition from KTVW-TV and horror host Robert O. Smith aka Dr. ZinGRR, during 1972–74.. Broadcast on Channel 13, the station had less of a reach than Channel 7, but Smith's cadre of characters—The Dream Maker, Peter Gorre, the Masked Doily, Count Lickula, et al.--proved popular among horror fans in the Seattle area.

Although The Count hung up his cape in 1975 as far as Nightmare Theatre was concerned, the program continued for several more years without his presence. (Like his early-morning compatriot J.P. Patches, The Count had become a local celebrity and pop-culture icon.) His retirement—and the fact that horror cinema had lost favor with an audience now more interested in modern science fiction fare like Star Wars—spelled the inevitable death knell of Nightmare Theatre. Towey returned in full regalia for a one-off televised Halloween special in 1978, which also marked the official end of Nightmare Theatre.

== Lost Footage ==
Because the live wraparound sequences for Nightmare Theatre was shot on half-inch videotape, the master cassettes were regularly recycled by the program's producers for economical reasons. Thus, very little of Towey's televised performances survive today, far less than what remains of The J.P. Patches Show. The only introduction from Nightmare Theatre known to exist—about two minutes worth of footage—has been saved for posterity on the J.P. Patches: Memories video and the J.P. Patches DVD Collection. A few audio clips have survived as well, recorded by young fans with portable tape recorders during its original run, which have recently surfaced on the Internet.

== Joe Towey ==
After the show ended in 1978, Joe continued to make live appearances as The Count for such special events as parties and charity auctions in Washington State, usually alongside longtime friend and partner-in-crime Chris Wedes aka J.P. Patches. (Chris made at least one guest appearance on Nightmare Theatre, but he never directed the show as some sources erroneously claim.) Towey died in 1989 at the age of 55, having been in ill health for more than a year. During his thirty-year stay at KIRO-TV, Joe Towey received two Emmy Awards for his work as director on The J.P. Patches Show, and another for set designer on Nightmare Theatre.
