= Kathi Goertzen =

American journalist (1958–2012)

- Born: April 30, 1958; Seattle, Washington, U.S.
- Died: August 13, 2012 (aged 54); Seattle, Washington, U.S.
- Occupation: News anchor for KOMO-TV

Kathi Goertzen (April 30, 1958 – August 13, 2012) was a longtime television news journalist. She spent most of her career with Seattle ABC affiliate KOMO-TV. She joined KOMO in June 1980, after the eruption of Mount St. Helens and did many special newscasts thereafter, including the fall of the Berlin Wall (she was the first local American TV news reporter to do so).

== Before KOMO ==
Kathi Goertzen was born in Seattle on April 30, 1958. She graduated from Queen Anne High School and had initially set out to be a veterinarian. However, she changed her career goals after witnessing a dog necropsy, and then aspired to become a journalist, enrolling at Washington State University. Kathi Goertzen graduated in 1980 from WSU with a Bachelor of Arts degree in communications from the Edward R. Murrow School of Communication. She was a member of the Omega chapter of Alpha Chi Omega sorority, and served as an anchor/reporter for the student-produced newscast at KWSU-TV. She also interned as a beat reporter at KREM-TV in Spokane.

== Career with KOMO ==
After joining KOMO-TV in 1980, she became a regular reporter. After one year, in 1981, she became a general assignment reporter, then in 1982, she took weekend news anchoring duties from anchor Kerry Brock. In 1984, she became co-anchor for the weeknight editions of KOMO 4 News with Jim Harriott. When the Berlin Wall fell, Goertzen was the first local American news reporter to report live from the scene at Brandenburg Gate in West Berlin. In 2005, Goertzen and co-anchor Dan Lewis became the longest-running network affiliate news team in the United States west of the Mississippi River.

=== Absences from KOMO ===
In 1989, she took a three-month maternity leave upon the birth of her first daughter, Alexa, and another maternity leave again in 1995 after her second daughter, Andrea, was born.

On December 1, 1998, KOMO announced that Goertzen had been suffering from a type of meningioma, a noncancerous tumor that grows on the brainstem that affects speech and the ability to swallow. The announcement led to many longtime KOMO viewers pouring out support, wishing for a speedy recovery. Treatment went quickly for the first occurrence, and she returned to KOMO News on January 3, 1999. When she returned to the program, her co-anchor, Dan Lewis, said, "Kathi, don't ever leave me like that again."

The tumor recurred in 2005, resulting in Goertzen announcing a leave of absence on September 16. Because the tumor was located near nerves that are vital to speech, it could not be removed completely. Goertzen announced on April 2, 2008, that she would be undergoing a third surgery to remove the tumor. The surgery "went better than expected" on April 3, and after spending several months on an experimental chemotherapy drug used to fight kidney cancer (with high levels of success), it was announced on August 14 that Goertzen would resume anchor duties alongside Dan Lewis on September 2, 2008.

A little more than two weeks following her return to KOMO, Goertzen announced that the tumor had grown back yet again, and that she would undergo her fourth operation to have the tumor removed. Her announcement topped all the evening newscasts, with longtime news anchor Dan Lewis leading the 11 PM newscast.

After a number of surgeries to remove the tumor, and five months off television, Goertzen returned to KOMO-TV on Monday, February 16, 2009. The surgeries had partially paralyzed the right side of her face, resulting in difficulty blinking her right eye. As a result of her surgeries, she wore glasses off air; in her 29-year history with KOMO-TV, she had never worn them on-air. Her return to broadcasting the evening news was met with scores of "Welcome back, Kathi!" remarks by fellow KOMO colleagues and KOMO viewers.

On February 2, 2011, Goertzen again underwent surgery to remove parts of the tumor that continued to grow. The various treatments had damaged her facial nerve, which partially debilitated one side of her face. During a surgery that lasted ten hours, doctors reported that they were going to be more aggressive and remove the entire tumor. Her doctors had hoped that this would be Kathi's last surgery. The creation of a support page on Facebook for Kathi had amassed over 72,000 fans as of July 29, 2012.

On January 26, 2012, Kathi posted on her Facebook page: "Doctor saw some tumor growth so wants to do surgery...again! Will keep you posted when. Really appreciate your good thoughts and prayers. As one of my FB friends wrote, "There's no room for fear and faith in this house!" Dread, maybe. :)"

== Community involvement ==
Kathi Goertzen served on the WSU Foundation Board of Trustees from 1994 to 2000. She was also a Board Member of the YWCA of Seattle-King County.

== Personal life and death ==
Goertzen married Rick Jewett, a KOMO-TV account executive (formerly a sales executive, and previously a KOMO photographer), in 1993. Goertzen had two daughters, Alexa and Andrea.

Goertzen died on August 13, 2012, of pneumonia, a complication of her long battle with recurring meningiomas.
