= Climb to Fight Breast Cancer =

Annual event

Logo

Climb to Fight Breast Cancer is an annual series of mountain climbs to raise funds to support breast cancer research at the world-renowned Fred Hutchinson Cancer Research Center in Seattle, Washington. The climbs also help to increase awareness of the prevention, detection and treatment of breast cancer.

== The climbs ==
Climbers of all skill levels and backgrounds can register for climbs on 12 peaks around the world. Six of the mountains are in the Cascade Range (Mount Baker, Mount Rainier, Mount Adams, Mount St. Helens, Mount Hood and Mount Shasta); one is in the Olympic Mountains, Mount Olympus; three of them are a part of the Seven Summits (Denali in Alaska, Mount Elbrus in Russia, Mount Kilimanjaro in Tanzania, Everest Base Camp Trek in Nepal); and two of them are volcanoes in Mexico (Iztaccihuatl and Pico de Orizaba).

Depending on which peak a climber chooses, the climber is required to raise a specified minimum amount of funds for the Fred Hutchinson Cancer Research Center. The Climb to Fight Breast Cancer was established in 1997.

== See also ==
- List of health related charity fundraisers
