= KREM (TV) =

Television station in Spokane, Washington

- Spokane, Washington; Coeur d'Alene, Idaho; United States
- City: Spokane, Washington
- Channels: Digital: 20 (UHF); Virtual: 2
- Branding: KREM 2

Programming
- Affiliations: 2.1: CBS; for others, see § Subchannels

Ownership
- Owner: Tegna Inc., a subsidiary of Nexstar Media Group; (King Broadcasting Company)
- Sister stations: KSKN

History
- First air date: October 31, 1954
- Former call signs: KREM-TV (1954–2009)
- Former channel numbers: Analog: 2 (VHF, 1954–2009)
- Former affiliations: Independent (1954); ABC (1954–1976)
- Call sign meaning: Taken from KREM radio, whose call letters were randomly assigned

Technical information
- Licensing authority: FCC
- Facility ID: 34868
- ERP: 893 kW
- HAAT: 641 m (2,103 ft)
- Transmitter coordinates: 47°35′41″N 117°17′57″W
- Translator(s): see § Translators

Links
- Public license information: Public file; LMS
- Website: www.krem.com

KREM (channel 2) is a television station in Spokane, Washington, United States, affiliated with CBS. It is owned by the Tegna subsidiary of Nexstar Media Group alongside CW outlet KSKN (channel 22). The two stations share studios on South Regal Street in the Southgate neighborhood of Spokane; KREM's transmitter is on Krell Hill to the southeast, covering eastern Washington state and northern Idaho.

KREM-TV began broadcasting on October 31, 1954, as Spokane's third station. It was owned with KREM (970 AM) by Louis Wasmer, who had identified KREM's facilities as ideal for television expansion and bought the radio station at the same time he applied for the permit. KREM-TV became an ABC affiliate within two months of signing on and was purchased by King Broadcasting in 1963. In 1976, CBS induced an affiliation switch to abandon its previous Spokane affiliate, KXLY-TV (channel 4), and moved its programs to channel 2. Under the successive ownerships of the Providence Journal Company, Belo Corporation, and Gannett (whose television stations were split as Tegna in 2015), KREM has competed closely with KHQ-TV for local news ratings and revenue leadership in the Spokane TV market.

== History ==
=== Construction and early years ===
After the Federal Communications Commission (FCC) lifted its years-long freeze on television station allocations in 1952, Spokane was allotted three commercial TV channels—2, 4, and 6. In June 1952, radio station owner Louis Wasmer applied to the FCC for channel 2. At the time, Wasmer was in the process of selling one Spokane radio station, KSPO, to buy another, KREM (970 AM), from Cole Wylie in a deal approved by the FCC in July 1952; Wasmer found KREM's facilities, on the Moran Prairie, well-suited for television transmission. A second group, Spokane radio station KNEW (as Television Spokane, Inc.), applied for channel 2; this came after their filing for channel 4 came the same day the commission awarded KXLY-TV's construction permit.

The multiple applications threw the case to a comparative hearing, which opened in May 1953 after multiple delays. Wasmer was criticized by Television Spokane for buying and selling radio stations, while Wasmer unsuccessfully impugned Television Spokane's financial capacity to build the proposed station. Several participants had medical problems during the hearing process. KNEW's chief engineer collapsed on the witness stand during questioning; Wasmer suffered from food poisoning; and the wife of Burl Hagadone, a 40-percent owner of Television Spokane, was hospitalized in Montana, prompting the entire proceeding to be recessed. It never resumed, as the Television Spokane bid was withdrawn on March 1, 1954, in exchange for reimbursement of permit expenses by Wasmer and a right of first refusal should KREM-TV come up for sale.

Following Television Spokane's withdrawal, an FCC hearing examiner recommended Wasmer be granted channel 2, and within two weeks he began construction on KREM-TV, including a studio expansion to KREM's existing radio facilities. By the end of August, a 747-foot (228 m) tower had been erected for use by KREM AM, a new KREM-FM 92.9, and channel 2. KREM-TV signed on October 31, 1954, with an "inaugural program" at 6:30 p.m. It was briefly an independent station until December 6, 1954, when it affiliated with ABC.

In July 1957, the King Broadcasting Company and its owner, Seattle businesswoman Dorothy Bullitt, agreed to buy the KREM radio and TV stations for $2 million (equivalent to $17.5 million in 2025 dollars). The FCC granted the sale in September only to stay its approval when Television Spokane protested that its right of first refusal had not been respected. To resolve the dispute, Wasmer acquired Television Spokane, clearing the way for the sale to be reapproved by the commission. Wasmer continued as president of the KREM stations until he departed in 1963, marking his retirement.

The FCC approved an application by a community translator organization to set up rebroadcasters of KREM-TV and KHQ-TV in Lewiston, Idaho, in 1958. Though Lewiston's local station, KLEW-TV (channel 3), objected, at the time KREM was with ABC and KLEW was a CBS affiliate. The translator operated from 1958 to 1959 and again beginning in 1963. In 1972, cable subscribers in Calgary, Alberta, Canada, began receiving KREM in their lineups; the cable systems in Edmonton followed suit in May 1975 after the Canadian Radio and Television Commission previously had ordered a delay. By the time Fort McMurray cable subscribers received KREM in 1977, the station reached half as many homes on cable in Canada as it did in the United States.

=== 1976 affiliation switch ===
On February 19, 1976, CBS sent a notice of termination to its Spokane affiliate, KXLY-TV. Cited in the network's decision was its "judgment that we could get wider exposure for our programs with another station"; one source noted that a high rate of program preemptions prompted the disaffiliation. It was the first time CBS had disaffiliated from a station since 1971. This put CBS in the position of choosing between KHQ-TV (channel 6), the NBC affiliate, and KREM-TV for its new Spokane-area outlet. Some speculation indicated KREM was interested in affiliating with NBC, thereby aligning it with its King Broadcasting sister stations in Seattle (KING-TV) and Portland (KGW-TV), and CBS approached both stations. However, KHQ-TV opted to continue with NBC, and KREM agreed to affiliate with CBS. The switch took place on August 8, 1976, with KXLY becoming the new ABC affiliate.

=== Providence Journal, Belo, and Gannett/Tegna ownership ===
King Broadcasting Company put itself up for sale in 1990, citing the age of its majority owners, Patsy Bullitt Collins and Harriet Stimson Bullitt, the daughters of the late Dorothy Bullitt. It accepted an offer from the Providence Journal Company in 1991, and the transaction closed the following year. Under Providence Journal, KREM became a contributor to the new Northwest Cable News (NWCN) regional service when it launched in 1995, with one reporter dedicated to NWCN based in Spokane. The Belo Corporation purchased the Providence Journal Company in 1996.

In July 1996, KREM began programming KSKN (channel 22), an independent station, under a local marketing agreement. The next year, that station joined UPN and began airing a 10 p.m. newscast produced by KREM. After the 1999 legalization of duopolies, Belo purchased KSKN for $5 million (equivalent to $8.67 million in 2025 dollars) in 2001.

On June 13, 2013, the Gannett Company announced that it would acquire Belo. The sale was completed on December 23. Gannett's TV stations and newspapers split into separate companies in 2015, the former being named Tegna.

== Local programming ==
=== News operation ===
KREM-TV had local news from the start; newscaster Dick Hoover delivered a three-minute local newscast during channel 2's first day on air. Hoover remained with KREM until 1955 and returned from 1957 to 1966, becoming the most well-known face of the station. From 1968 to 1979, KREM's main anchor was Jeff Wasson, described by Deborah McBride of The Spokesman-Review as "the Walter Cronkite of Spokane's television media". By that time, however, KHQ was the leader in the local news audience, with KREM running a consistent second. KREM made its first market-leading showing ever in the November 1984 Arbitron ratings period, though this was brief, and KHQ quickly took back first place overall in the next ratings survey.

King Broadcasting promoted Phil Wenstrand from the post of news director at KTVB to the same position at KREM in 1986. Under Wenstrand, KTVB had cemented itself as the news leader in Boise. The station went through two male anchors in five months before hiring Charles Rowe, a former anchor in Portland returning to the profession. Wenstrand also brought Eric Johnson from KTVB to KREM to anchor sports. After KHQ moved its early evening news in 1988 from 5 to 5:30 p.m., leaving only KREM and KXLY competing against each other for viewers, the station's early news ratings moved into first ahead of KXLY at 5 and KHQ at 5:30. KHQ soon reverted the change, tightening the early evening news race with KREM ahead. During this time, in 1988, KREM was the first Spokane-area station to air an extended-length morning newscast. By 1990, it had almost as many viewers as the 11 p.m. news because neither KXLY nor KHQ had started one yet. Wenstrand was promoted again in 1989 to run KGW in Portland and later hired Johnson from Spokane.

Nadine Woodward joined KREM from KIDK in Idaho Falls, Idaho, in 1990 to anchor channel 2's evening newscasts. For most of the decade, KREM continued to lead in early evening news—helped by the popular lead-in of The Oprah Winfrey Show—while the 11 p.m. news race was much tighter, primarily to the benefit of KHQ. Between 1991 and 1993, the station produced the 10 p.m. news for Fox affiliate KAYU-TV (channel 28); the news share agreement, the first of its kind on the West Coast, provided the station with a newscast very similar to KREM's new format and was ditched for a more Fox-specific newscast produced by KHQ. In 1997, KREM, with its reporter Tom Grant, won an Alfred I. duPont–Columbia University Award for investigative reporting on the Wenatchee child abuse prosecutions. After assuming operations of KSKN, KREM debuted a 10 p.m. newscast for the station in September 1997; at the time, KAYU had no newscast at all. As of 2024, KSKN had a dedicated morning news extension from 7 to 9 a.m. in addition to the 10 p.m. news and simulcasts of a number of KREM newscasts.

Woodward departed KREM in 2009 amid a dispute with the station over a pay cut request that she said was not asked of her male colleagues. She was hired a year later by KXLY-TV as one of the hosts of its morning news and a talk show host for KXLY radio; in 2019, she was elected the mayor of Spokane. In the early 2010s, KHQ and KREM were neck-and-neck in most local news ratings and revenue metrics.

On October 17, 2021, the station apologized for showing a moving image from a pornographic video on a weather center monitor during that evening's 6 p.m. newscast. The origin of the video's appearance on an internal station monitor, be it internally or from another source, was under police and corporate investigation. Though Tegna was unable to determine who was responsible, it discovered that a screencasting feature on the monitor, connected to an unsecured wireless network in the studio, was used to show the video. In 2025, the FCC assessed a $222,000 fine against Tegna for the incident.

=== Sports programming ===
KREM shares the rights to non-national Seattle Kraken games with sister station KSKN.

=== Notable former on-air staff ===
- Paul Deanno – anchor/meteorologist, 1997–1999
- Tim Lewis – sports anchor and later sports director, 2006–2012
- Maureen O'Boyle – anchor, 1986–1988

== Technical information ==
=== Subchannels ===
KREM's transmitter is on Krell Hill, south of Spokane. The station's signal is multiplexed:

Subchannels of KREM
Subchannel	Res.	Short name	Programming
2.1	1080i	KREM-HD	CBS
2.2	480i	Crime	True Crime Network
2.3	480i	CourtTV	Grit
2.4	480i	NEST	The Nest
2.5	480i	ShopLC	Shop LC
2.6	480i	GetTV	Great
2.7	480i	OUTLAW	Outlaw
2.8	480i	Comet	Comet
2.9	480i	COZI	Cozi TV

=== Analog-to-digital conversion ===
KREM ended regular programming on its analog signal, over VHF channel 2, on June 12, 2009, the official digital television transition date; it was the only major network affiliate in Spokane not to switch in February, the original transition date. This was because Belo would not permit stations to shift in February if at least one other station—in this case, KGPX-TV—opted to wait until June. The station's digital signal remained on its pre-transition UHF channel 20.

=== Translators ===
KREM's signal is rebroadcast over the following translators:

- Bonners Ferry, Idaho: K26OO-D
- Bull Lake Valley, Montana: K07ZP-D
- Brewster and Pateros, Washington; K08AP-D
- Coeur d'Alene, Idaho: K30OA-D
- Coolin, Idaho: K09XY-D (Lakeview Mountain), K32OA-D (Cavanaugh Bay/Kinner Point)
- Kalispell and Lakeside, Montana: K02RJ-D
- Leavenworth, Washington: K07ZL-D
- Lewiston, Idaho: K21CC-D
- Methow, Washington: K36PH-D
- Polson, Montana: K35LB-D
- Winthrop–Twisp, Washington: K10BD-D
