= KVI =

Talk radio station in Seattle

- Seattle, Washington; United States
- Broadcast area: Seattle–Tacoma metropolitan area
- Frequency: 570 kHz
- Branding: Talk Radio 570 KVI

Programming
- Format: Conservative talk radio
- Affiliations: 24/7 News; Compass Media Networks; Westwood One

Ownership
- Owner: Lotus Communications; (Lotus Seattle Corp.)
- Sister stations: KNWN, KNWN-FM, KPLZ-FM

History
- First air date: February 13, 1927
- Former frequencies: 875 kHz (1927); 870 kHz (1927); 1280 kHz (1927); 1060 kHz (1928); 760 kHz (1929–1932)

Technical information
- Licensing authority: FCC
- Facility ID: 35853
- Class: B
- Power: 5,000 watts (unlimited)
- Transmitter coordinates: 47°25′18.4″N 122°25′48.5″W
- Repeater: 101.5 KPLZ-FM-HD3 (Seattle)

Links
- Public license information: Public file; LMS
- Webcast: Listen live
- Website: kvi.com

KVI (570 AM) is a commercial radio station licensed to Seattle, Washington, United States, known as "News Talk 570 KVI". Owned by Lotus Communications, it airs a conservative talk format, with studios located with former sister station KOMO-TV at KOMO Plaza (formerly Fisher Plaza) in Seattle. KVI's transmitter is on Vashon Island, located roughly halfway between Seattle and Tacoma; the station's signal extends from the Canada–United States border to Olympia.

== History ==
=== Early years ===
KVI was first licensed on November 24, 1926, to the Puget Sound Radio Broadcasting Company, located in Tacoma. It made its debut broadcast from the First Presbyterian Church on the evening of February 13, 1927. The station began operating during a period when the U.S. had temporarily lost the ability to assign frequencies and powers, and it was initially reported to be transmitting on a wavelength of 342.5 meters (875 kHz).

After the formation of the Federal Radio Commission (FRC) in March 1927, the station was assigned to 870 kHz, which was soon changed to 1280 kHz, with a later shift to 1060 kHz. With the November 11, 1928, implementation of the FRC's General Order 40, the station was initially assigned to 1340 kHz, which was changed to limited hours on 760 kHz, with the restriction that it was not allowed to broadcast during nighttime hours when co-channel WJZ in New York City was on the air. By September 1932, it was moved to its current assignment of 570 kHz. It transmitted with 1,000 watts. During the "Golden Age of Radio", KVI was a network affiliate of CBS, carrying its schedule of dramas, comedies, news, sports, game shows, soap operas and big band broadcasts. It also carried programs from the Don Lee Network.

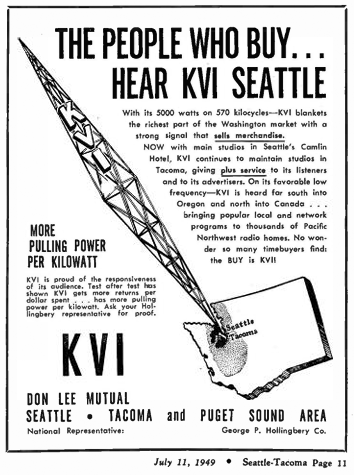
In 1949, KVI moved its main studio from Tacoma to Seattle.

In 1949, KVI relocated its main studio into the Camlin Hotel in Downtown Seattle. KVI got a boost to 5,000 watts, transmitting from a single tower on Vashon Island. After its move to Seattle, it shifted its network affiliatiom to the Mutual Broadcasting System, because KIRO was already Seattle's CBS affiliate.

=== AC and MOR music ===
In 1959, Gene Autry's Golden West Broadcasters added KVI to its portfolio. KVI switched to an adult contemporary format in 1964. By 1973, KVI had evolved into a full service, middle of the road (MOR) direction. It was during this period that it became established as a dominant player in the market. KVI was the flagship station for the ill-fated Seattle Pilots baseball team in their only season of play in 1969. It later became the radio home for the successful Seattle Mariners, from their inaugural season of 1977 until 1984. KVI was also the original home of the Seattle Sounders (NASL) from their inaugural season in 1974 until 1976, and was the westside flagship station of the Washington State University Cougars from 1972 until 1979 and again from 1983 until 1987.

In 1976, KVI acquired an FM radio station, KETO on 101.5 MHz. Under Golden West, the new KVI-FM became a successful Adult Top 40 station, now known as KPLZ-FM. With the beginning of the 1980s, music listening on AM radio was shifting to FM and KVI added several talk shows.

=== Oldies and Talk ===
On July 23, 1984, KVI switched to oldies. That direction would last less than a decade, and by 1992, KVI had a fulltime talk radio format. At first, the station used the slogan "the balanced alternative" with a line up alternating liberal and conservative talk hosts, but by 1993, KVI dropped all its liberal hosts except Mike Siegel. Siegel, formerly a liberal, swung right in his views during this period and remained on the station. The other slots were filled by a line up of both local and nationally syndicated conservatives. By May 1994, the year KVI and KPLZ were sold to Fisher Communications, KVI had an almost entirely conservative-talk format.

KVI returned to a full service format at 4 p.m. on November 7, 2010, with a mix of oldies and recent hits, news and traffic updates.

=== Smart Talk ===
Due to the failure of the format, which only garnered an average of a 0.5 share of the market, KVI began stunting with Christmas music on Thanksgiving Day, 2011. On January 3, 2012, the station flipped back to talk, this time as "Smart Talk," with an emphasis on entertainment reports, lifestyle and health info, and local news. Programs included "Sunrise Seattle", a Good Morning America-type program hosted by Mark Christopher and Elisa Jaffe, Don Imus, Clark Howard, Phil Hendrie, "The Buzz" with Scott Carty, the "Daily Wrap from the Wall Street Journal" with Michael Castner, ConsumerMan with Herb Weisbaum, as well as paid brokered programming on weekends. After only nine months, the "Smart Talk" format was dropped on September 4, 2012, in favor of a return to conservative talk.

On April 11, 2013, Fisher announced that it would sell its properties, including KVI and KOMO-TV, to the Sinclair Broadcast Group. The price for all the stations was $373.3 million. Although nearly all of Sinclair's broadcast properties are television stations, the company initially retained KVI, KPLZ-FM, KOMO and KOMO-FM. The deal was completed on August 8, 2013.

Previous logo

On June 3, 2021, Sinclair announced they would sell KVI, KPLZ and KOMO-AM-FM to Lotus Communications for $18 million. Sinclair retained KOMO-TV. The sale was completed on September 28, 2021.

== Programming ==
Local hosts on KVI include John Carlson and Ari Hoffman; the remainder of the schedule consists of nationally syndicated conservative talk shows.

== See also ==
- List of three-letter broadcast call signs in the United States
