= John Carlson (radio host) =

American business executive and former talk radio host (born 1959)

Personal details
- Born: John Eric Carlson; June 3, 1959 (age 67) Harvey, Illinois, U.S.
- Party: Republican
- Education: University of Washington, Seattle (BA)

John Eric Carlson (born June 3, 1959) is an American business executive and civic leader. He is President of the Kemper Development Company, a Bellevue, Washington-based real estate development firm. He is also a former Seattle-area radio host, newspaper columnist, and television commentator, and was the Republican candidate for Governor of Washington in 2000.

== Business career ==
Carlson is President of the Kemper Development Company (KDC), which developed, owns, and operates the Bellevue Collection, a large mixed-use shopping, dining, and entertainment complex in Bellevue, Washington. Prior to becoming President, he served as a vice president of the company.

== Media career ==
Before transitioning fully into business leadership, Carlson was a prominent figure in Seattle-area news media. From the early 1990s until 2025, he hosted a daily radio talk show on KVI (570 AM) and KOMO (1000 AM), where his programming focused on public policy, regional issues, and civic affairs. Several times he was listed in Talkers Magazine as one of America's 100 leading talk radio hosts.

He also served as a television commentator for KIRO-TV (CBS), KOMO-TV (ABC), and KCTS (PBS). His time as a commentator on KIRO-TV evening news included a debate segment with local liberal historian Walt Crowley.

Carlson has authored opinion pieces that have been published in The Wall Street Journal, The Washington Post, USA Today, and every major daily paper in Washington state.

== Public Service ==
From 2011 to 2019, Carlson served as a Planning Commissioner for the City of Bellevue, during a period that included major revisions to the city's shoreline management plan and downtown growth strategy. He serves on the boards of several civic and nonprofit organizations, including The Salvation Army, the Boy Scouts of America (Chief Seattle Council), the Bellevue Police Foundation, the Bellevue Chamber of Commerce, and the Bellevue Downtown Association.

Carlson ran an unsuccessful campaign for Governor of Washington against incumbent Gary Locke in 2000.

== Policy Work ==
Carlson was a co-founder and former president of the Washington Policy Center, a free-market public policy research organization based in Washington state. He led three successful statewide initiative drives, including America's first Three Strikes You're Out statutes in 1993.

== Personal ==
Carlson grew up in West Seattle, Washington, attending Jefferson and Holy Rosary Elementary, Madison Jr. High, and West Seattle High School (Class of '77). Carlson graduated in 1981 with a bachelor's degree in political science in the Honors Program at the University of Washington. In late 1999, he was listed as one of the university's one hundred "Alumni of the Century". In 2008 the UW's alumni magazine listed him as one of its "Wondrous 100" living alumni.

Carlson rides Indian motorcycles. He has climbed Mount Rainier three times to benefit the Fred Hutchinson Cancer Research Center's Climb to Fight Breast Cancer. He is married with two sons and lives in Bellevue, Washington, a Seattle suburb.

Party political offices
Preceded by Ellen Craswell	Republican nominee for Governor of Washington; 2000	Succeeded by Dino Rossi
