= KNWN (AM) =

- Seattle, Washington; United States
- Broadcast area: Seattle metropolitan area
- Frequency: 1000 kHz
- Branding: Northwest News Radio

Programming
- Format: All-news radio
- Affiliations: ABC News Radio; Bloomberg Radio; Westwood One

Ownership
- Owner: Lotus Communications; (Lotus Seattle Corp.)
- Sister stations: KPLZ-FM, KVI, KNWN-FM

History
- First air date: July 1926
- Former call signs: KGFA (1926); KOMO (1926–2022)
- Former frequencies: 980 kHz (1926–1941)
- Call sign meaning: "Northwest News"

Technical information
- Licensing authority: FCC
- Facility ID: 21647
- Class: A
- Power: 50,000 watts
- Transmitter coordinates: 47°27′48.4″N 122°26′31.5″W
- Repeaters: 97.7 KNWN-FM (Oakville); 101.5 KPLZ-FM HD2 (Seattle)

Links
- Public license information: Public file; LMS
- Website: nwnewsradio.com

KNWN (1000 kHz, "Northwest News Radio") is a commercial AM radio station licensed to Seattle, Washington, United States, and serving the Seattle metropolitan area. Owned by Lotus Communications, the station primarily airs an all-news format and is the local affiliate for ABC News Radio.

KNWN is a clear-channel Class A station, broadcasting with 50,000 watts, the maximum power for American AM stations. It is non-directional by day but uses a directional antenna at night to avoid interfering with WMVP in Chicago and XEOY in Mexico City, the two other Class A stations on 1000 AM. Under favorable conditions, KNWN can be heard in the daytime from Vancouver, British Columbia, to Portland, Oregon. At night it can be heard across much of Western North America. The station's studios and offices are co-located with former sister station KOMO-TV within KOMO Plaza (formerly Fisher Plaza) in the Lower Queen Anne section of Seattle, directly across the street from the Space Needle. The transmitter is on Vashon Island, off SW 159th Street.

KNWN's programming is simulcast full-time on KNWN-FM (97.7 FM), licensed to Oakville, Washington, as well as on several FM translator stations.

== History ==
=== Early years ===
In July 1926, KNWN was founded on Harbor Island, as KGFA at 980 kHz, by two owners: Birt F. Fisher, whose lease on Seattle radio station KTCL was about to run out, and the Fisher brothers of Fisher Flouring Mills, who had been on the island since 1911. (The Fisher Brothers and Birt Fisher were not related.) In preparation for the switch to the new station, Birt Fisher changed KTCL's call sign to KOMO. In December, his lease ended, and he took the call letters with him to KGFA. KOMO's first broadcast on 980 was December 31, 1926. The studios moved to Downtown Seattle in 1927. The station also began a long-running affiliation with NBC Radio that year as well, primarily with the Red Network, but also with the short-lived West Coast NBC Orange Network from 1931 to 1933. Over the following years, KOMO's frequency would go from 980 to 1080, back to 980, down to 920, up to 970, then back to 920, and settled at 950 after the NARBA frequency shakeup in 1941.

=== 1944 call letter swap between KJR and KOMO ===
Fisher's Blend Station bought NBC Blue Network affiliate KJR from NBC in 1941. However, the August 1941 adoption of the Federal Communications Commission's "duopoly" rule restricted licensees from operating more than one radio station in a given market, and an attempt by the Fisher family to be granted an exemption was unsuccessful. The Fishers decided to keep the superior frequency of 1000 kHz, but also keep the KOMO call letters that they had held since the 1920s. Thus, on May 6, 1944, KOMO and KJR swapped call letters, with the KOMO call sign moving from 950 kHz to the more desirable 1000 kHz. The next year KJR was sold to Birt F. Fisher, who was, as aforementioned, unrelated to the KOMO owners.

At its new frequency, KOMO began broadcasting with 50,000 watts of power from its current transmitter site on Vashon Island in 1948. New studios at the corner of Fourth and Denny, near what is now the Seattle Center, were dedicated in February 1948 and included space for an expansion into television broadcasting. The cost of the new facility exceeded $1 million.

KOMO Radio/TV's former broadcast facility photographed circa 1948–1959. Note the "NBC Affiliate" script on the facade.

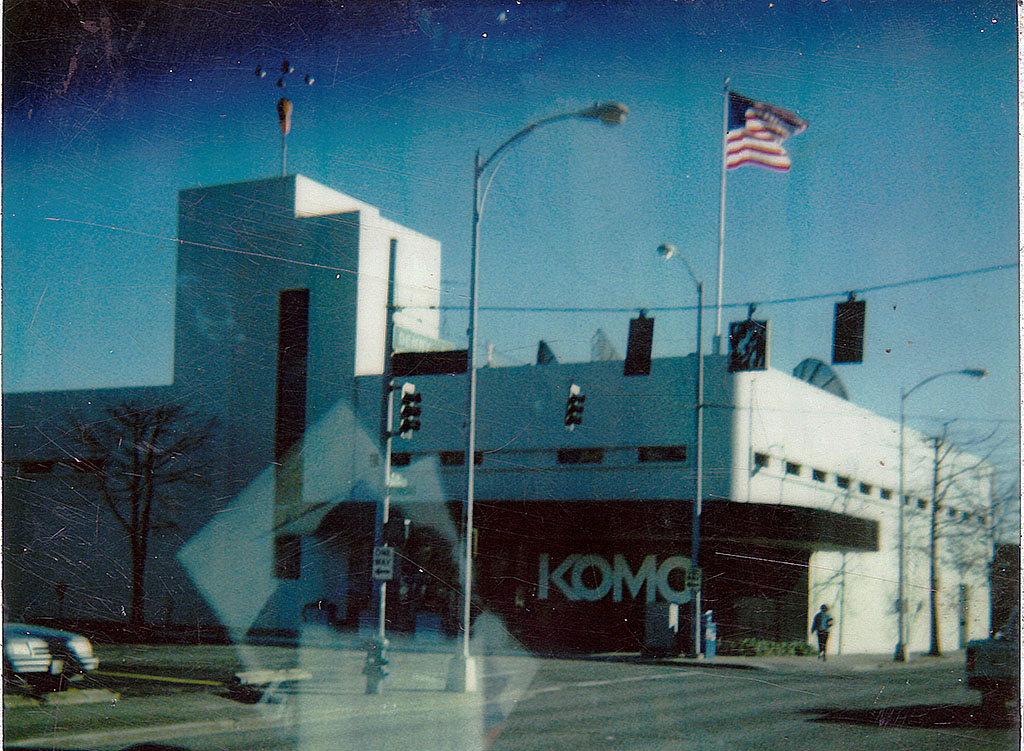
KOMO-TV's former broadcast facility at the current site of Fisher Plaza, taken on March 2, 1995, near the intersection of 4th Avenue North and Denny Way. This building was completed in 1948, expanded in 1975, and demolished in 2000 to make way for building 2 of the Fisher Plaza complex.

In 1953, KOMO-TV first signed on the air on Channel 4 as an affiliate of the NBC television network. Channel 4 swapped affiliations with KING-TV in 1958 and joined the ABC television network. KOMO radio followed suit by switching to the ABC radio network the next year.

=== Full service formats ===
Through the 1940s and 1950s, KOMO carried network dramas, comedies, game shows, soap operas and big band broadcasts, during the Golden Age of Radio. By 1964, old-line network programming had been phased out and KOMO carried a MOR music format. Long-time morning drive personality Larry Nelson began in 1967. By 1971, KOMO went towards an adult contemporary music format. From 1967 to 1978, KOMO was the original flagship station of the Seattle SuperSonics of the National Basketball Association with Bob Blackburn on play-by-play. Norm Gregory, formerly of KJR and KZOK-FM, joined the staff as an afternoon disk jockey in 1984. KOMO carried a full-service schedule of adult contemporary music, personality, news, talk, and Washington Huskies sports well into the early 1990s. It played more music than most full-service AM radio stations throughout the 1980s and into the early 1990s. Until 1993, the station was playing music in all dayparts, with local newscasts every hour. In the fall of 1993, evening talk programming was added. Dayparts gradually changed from music to talk and by the spring of 1996, the conversion to news-talk was complete.

In January 1981, former FM rock Programmer Ken Kohl joined KOMO. When Kohl arrived, the station's ratings were in the middle of the pack. After building the station's news commitment and implementing KOMO's first major marketing effort, Kohl and his KOMO team inched to within a tenth of a point of market leader KIRO. In January 1987, Kohl departed Seattle for KFI in Los Angeles. For the next several years, KOMO unsuccessfully attempted to directly compete with market leader KIRO. Following an outcry from loyal fans following his firing at KIRO-FM ("The Buzz 100.7") in 1999, local comedian Pat Cashman took over as KOMO's morning drive host, with Dr. Laura added for middays.

=== All-news format, change to KNWN ===
In late 2002, Fisher Communications announced a six-year contract for Seattle Mariners play-by-play rumored to be worth at least $10 million annually, a record for any Major League Baseball radio broadcast agreement, which started in the 2003 season. After the agreement expired in 2008, Mariners broadcasts returned to KIRO.

Concurrent with the acquisition of the Mariners broadcast rights, KOMO dropped its talk shows and became an all-news station with reports from an enlarged radio news staff and material from KOMO-TV newscasts. Some notable anchors include Bill Yeend, Manda Factor, Brian Calvert (who also works as a reporter and weathercaster on KOMO-TV), Lisa Brooks, Bill Rice, Art Sanders, Nancy Barrick, Pamela McCall, and Eric Slocum. It was announced on May 11, 2009, that KOMO would be simulcast on KFMY, an FM station in Oakville, Washington, starting on May 15, 2009. KFMY changed its call letters to KOMO-FM on May 18, 2009, to reflect the simulcast. The move was made to improve KOMO's coverage in the southern part of the market, as well as give listeners who prefer the sound of FM that option.

On April 11, 2013, after 87 years of owning the station, Fisher Communications announced that it would sell its properties, including KOMO, to the Sinclair Broadcast Group. Although Sinclair primarily owns television stations, the company initially retained KOMO and Fisher's two other Seattle radio stations, KVI and KPLZ-FM. The deal was completed on August 8, 2013. Two months after the sale, several radio employees were laid off as part of general cutbacks by Sinclair at most of the stations they acquired from Fisher.

On June 3, 2021, Sinclair announced they would sell KOMO-AM-FM, KVI, and KPLZ to Lotus Communications for $18 million. Of the $18 million, $5 million was in cash paid at closing; the remainder was Lotus' choice of either cash or advertising for Sinclair properties on Lotus' stations. Sinclair retained KOMO-TV, as well as rights to the KOMO call letters. Lotus and Sinclair also agreed to allow Lotus to use Sinclair equipment and IT systems, including sub-leasing the current KOMO studios, for 18 months following the sale; with it, KOMO-TV and KOMO-AM-FM were separated after 68 years. The sale was completed on September 28, 2021.

As required by the terms of the sale, KOMO's call sign was changed to KNWN (for "Northwest News") on February 2, 2022. The KNWN call sign is solely used for hourly station identifications, with the station primarily branding itself as "Northwest Newsradio".

== Marketing slogans ==
Early 1970s: "From the Olympics to the Cascades, from Vancouver (B.C., Canada) to Vancouver (Washington), this is KOMO Radio 1000!"

(also) "You're in KOMO Country". Slogan was used with a heavily orchestrated instrumental jingle package from a Canadian studio. The package was called "Big Timber", and was commissioned exclusively for KOMO.

Early 1980s: "A taste of what you're living for, KOMO AM 1000, Seattle!"

Early 1990s: "The station you depend on!"

2002–2005, 2006–2007: "First For Local News, Traffic and Weather." Similar to KOMO-TV's past slogan of "First 4 Local News".

2005–2006: "The commuter's best friend."

2007–2009: "The Northwest's News, Traffic and Weather Station."

2009–2014: "Everything you need to know."

2011–2012: "Western Washington's News, Traffic and Weather Station."

2012–2014: "What happens next, happens here."

2014–present: "Stay connected. Stay informed."

2016–2022: "Stay connected. Stay informed. Stay on time."

2025-now: "When You Need To Know."

== Logos ==
KOMO's logo from 2002 to September 2006

KOMO's Updated Logo, since September 2006

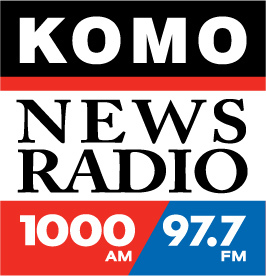
KOMO's logo introduced May 2009

KNWN's logo from January 2022 to February 2025
