= KNWN-FM =

Radio station in Oakville, Washington, United States

Simulcast of KNWN Seattle
- Oakville, Washington; United States
- Broadcast area: Seattle metropolitan area and Olympic Peninsula
- Frequency: 97.7 MHz
- Branding: Northwest News Radio

Programming
- Format: All-news
- Affiliations: ABC News Radio; Westwood One

Ownership
- Owner: Lotus Communications; (Lotus Seattle Corp.)
- Sister stations: KNWN, KPLZ-FM, KVI

History
- First air date: October 26, 1984 (as KSWW)
- Former call signs: KSWW (1984–1999); KFMY (1999–2009); KOMO-FM (2009–2022)
- Call sign meaning: "Northwest News"

Technical information
- Licensing authority: FCC
- Facility ID: 51167
- Class: C
- ERP: 69,000 watts
- HAAT: 701 meters (2,300 ft)
- Transmitter coordinates: 47.313°N 123.372°W
- Translator: 99.7 K259BG (Chehalis)
- Repeater: 101.5 KPLZ-HD2 (Seattle)

Links
- Public license information: Public file; LMS
- Website: www.nwnewsradio.com

KNWN-FM (97.7 MHz) is a commercial radio station licensed to Oakville, Washington, United States, and serving the Seattle metropolitan area and the Olympic Peninsula. It is owned by Lotus Communications. KNWN-FM broadcasts an all-news radio format, simulcast with sister station KNWN 1000 AM. It is a network affiliate of ABC News Radio. The studios and offices are co-located with former sister station KOMO-TV within KOMO Plaza (formerly Fisher Plaza) in the Lower Queen Anne section of Seattle, directly across the street from the Space Needle.

KNWN-FM has an effective radiated power (ERP) of 69,000 watts. The transmitter is off West Skokomish Valley Road in Skokomish, Washington, just south of the Olympic National Forest. With its high power and tower at 701 meters (2,300 feet) in height above average terrain (HAAT), KNWN-FM covers Seattle, Tacoma and much of the Olympic Peninsula with a 60 dBμ signal. KNWN-AM-FM are also heard on FM translator or booster stations in the region.

== History ==
On October 26, 1984, the station first signed on in Raymond, Washington. The first call sign was KSWW. It was originally a Class A FM station, powered at only 230 watts, a fraction of its current output. It was owned by Pacific Broadcasting Company and had an adult contemporary format.

In 1997, it was bought by Jodesha Broadcasting, Inc., for $182,400. The call letters switched to KFMY, and it began airing a classic rock format as "Eagle 97.7". It later was granted a power boost and increase in its antenna height, allowing it to be heard in the more lucrative Seattle-Tacoma radio market.

In May 2009, while still owned by South Sound Broadcasting, the station began simulcasting KOMO, with Fisher Communications operating 97.7 FM under a local marketing agreement. On May 18, 2009, the call letters changed to KOMO-FM. In June 2017, the outright sale of the station to the Sinclair Broadcast Group (which had acquired Fisher several years earlier) for $6.75 million was announced. The sale received Federal Communications Commission (FCC) approval several years later, and was consummated on June 9, 2020.

Previous logo

On June 3, 2021, Sinclair announced they would sell KOMO-AM-FM, KVI, and KPLZ-FM to Lotus Communications for $18 million. Of the $18 million, $5 million was in cash paid at closing; the remainder was Lotus' choice of either cash or advertising for Sinclair properties on Lotus' stations. Sinclair retained KOMO-TV, as well as rights to the KOMO call letters. Lotus and Sinclair also agreed to allow Lotus to use Sinclair equipment and IT systems, including sub-leasing the current KOMO studios, for 18 months following the sale. The sale was completed on September 28, 2021. As required by the terms of the sale, the KOMO radio stations changed their call signs to KNWN on February 2, 2022, in conjunction with a rebranding as "Northwest News Radio"; during the week preceding the relaunch, competitor KIRO-FM preemptively began promoting itself as "Your Northwest News Station".

== Translators ==
KNWN-FM is also carried on the following booster and FM translator stations to improve reception of the station:

- KNWN-FM1 (booster) 97.7 FM Tukwila
- K259BG (KNWN) 99.7 FM Chehalis
