= Steve Pool =

American journalist (1953–2023)

- Pool in 2015
- Born: November 5, 1953
- Died: November 22, 2023 (aged 70); Seattle, Washington, U.S.
- Education: University of Washington (BA, Communications & Speech)
- Occupation: Journalist
- Years active: 1977–2019
- Notable credit: KOMO 4 News (1977–2019)
- Spouse: Michelle
- Children: 2

Steve Pool (November 5, 1953 – November 22, 2023) was an American weather presenter and journalist. He began covering sports for KOMO-TV in Seattle in 1977 and eventually became the principal weather anchor for that station, a position he held from 1984 to 2019.

== Early life ==
Pool graduated from Tyee High School in SeaTac, Washington where he served as the student body president.

== Career ==
Pool started his career at KOMO-TV as an intern while studying at the University of Washington. After graduating in 1978, Pool became a writer, reporter, and eventually a weathercaster.

In the 1980s, Pool began hosting a program on KOMO-TV titled Front Runners which aired every Saturday.

In the 1990s, Pool was the host of a children's direct-to-video series called Little Steps.

Pool received eight Emmy Awards during his career and made more than 70 appearances on Good Morning America.

Additionally, he was the author of a book about weather and its forecasting, titled Somewhere, I Was Right.

In 2004, he was inducted into the University of Washington Department of Communications Hall of Fame.

== Retirement ==
Pool announced his retirement from broadcasting in November 2019 after being treated successfully for prostate cancer.

== Personal life and death ==
Pool was married to Michelle and they had two daughters, Lindsey and Marissa.

On November 22, 2023, Pool died from early-onset Alzheimer's disease, which he had for several years. He was 70. Pool's death was announced two days later by his wife.
