= KOMO-TV =

Television station in Seattle

- Seattle–Tacoma, Washington; United States
- City: Seattle, Washington
- Channels: Digital: 30 (UHF); Virtual: 4
- Branding: KOMO 4; KOMO News; (pronounced as a word)

Programming
- Affiliations: 4.1: ABC; for others, see § Subchannels

Ownership
- Owner: Sinclair Broadcast Group; (Sinclair Seattle Licensee, LLC)
- Sister stations: KUNS-TV

History
- Founded: June 1953
- First air date: December 11, 1953
- Former channel numbers: Analog: 4 (VHF, 1953–2009); Digital: 38 (UHF, 1998–2020)
- Former affiliations: NBC (1953–1959); ABC (secondary, 1958–1959); The CW (secondary, 2023)
- Call sign meaning: Derived from former sister station KOMO (now KNWN), randomly assigned

Technical information
- Licensing authority: FCC
- Facility ID: 21656
- ERP: 915 kW
- HAAT: 259 m (850 ft)
- Transmitter coordinates: 47°37′55″N 122°21′14″W

Links
- Public license information: Public file; LMS
- Website: komonews.com

KOMO-TV (channel 4) is a television station in Seattle, Washington, United States, affiliated with ABC. It is owned by Sinclair Broadcast Group alongside Bellevue-licensed CW affiliate KUNS-TV (channel 51). The two stations share studios within KOMO Plaza (formerly Fisher Plaza) in the Lower Queen Anne section of Seattle adjacent to the Space Needle; KOMO-TV's transmitter is located in the city's Queen Anne neighborhood.

KOMO-TV signed on in December 1953 as the flagship station of Seattle-based Fisher Broadcasting; originally an NBC affiliate, it was the television extension to KOMO (1000 AM), which was a sister station until 2021. The station became Seattle's ABC affiliate in 1959 when KING-TV affiliated with NBC after a year-long transition period; it has generally ranked second in the city's television market ratings behind KING-TV throughout its existence.

== History ==
=== Beginnings ===
KOMO-TV began operating on December 11, 1953, as an NBC affiliate, owing to KOMO radio's long-time relationship with the NBC Radio Network. It is the fourth-oldest television station in the Seattle–Tacoma area. KOMO also has an almost forgotten distinction as being the first station in Seattle to broadcast a television signal. Whereas crosstown rival KRSC-TV (channel 5, now KING-TV) was the first to air "wide audience" television in November 1948, KOMO broadcast a television signal nearly 20 years prior on an experimental basis. On June 3, 1929, KOMO radio engineer Francis J. Brott televised images of a heart, a diamond, a question mark, letters, and numbers over electrical lines to small sets with one-inch screens—23 years before KOMO-TV's first regular broadcasts. A handful of viewers were captivated by the broadcast. KOMO would likely have held the distinction of being the first television station in Seattle, and perhaps the nation, if it were not for the occurrences of the Great Depression and World War II.

The station was originally owned by the Fisher family, which had its start in the flour mill and lumber businesses. The Fishers branched into broadcasting with its founding of KOMO radio in 1926. In competing for the channel 4 construction permit, the Fishers faced off against the then-owners of KJR radio. KOMO was awarded the license in June 1953 after the KJR group dropped their bid, and KOMO-TV first signed on the air only five months later. William W. Warren, general manager of KOMO radio and a nephew of KOMO co-founder Oliver D. Fisher, oversaw the development of KOMO-TV and remained involved with the station's management until his retirement in 1987.

In 1954, a KOMO news photographer discovered a way to develop color film in a new process that took just a few hours instead of days. His discovery allowed KOMO-TV to become the first television station in the nation to broadcast in true color.

In October 1958, however, NBC signed affiliation deals with King Broadcasting Company for their radio and television properties in Seattle and Portland, Oregon. In Seattle, channel 4 shared both ABC and NBC programming with KING-TV until September 27, 1959, when KING-TV took the NBC affiliation full-time. At that point, KOMO-TV became an exclusive ABC affiliate.

During the 1960s, local television personality Don McCune became well known in the Seattle market for two programs seen on KOMO-TV. Thousands of children in the area knew McCune as "Captain Puget", his role while hosting a children's entertainment program. Channel 4 and McCune also produced the documentary series Exploration Northwest, which explored many of the places and people of the Pacific Northwest.

=== Mount St. Helens eruption, May 18, 1980 ===
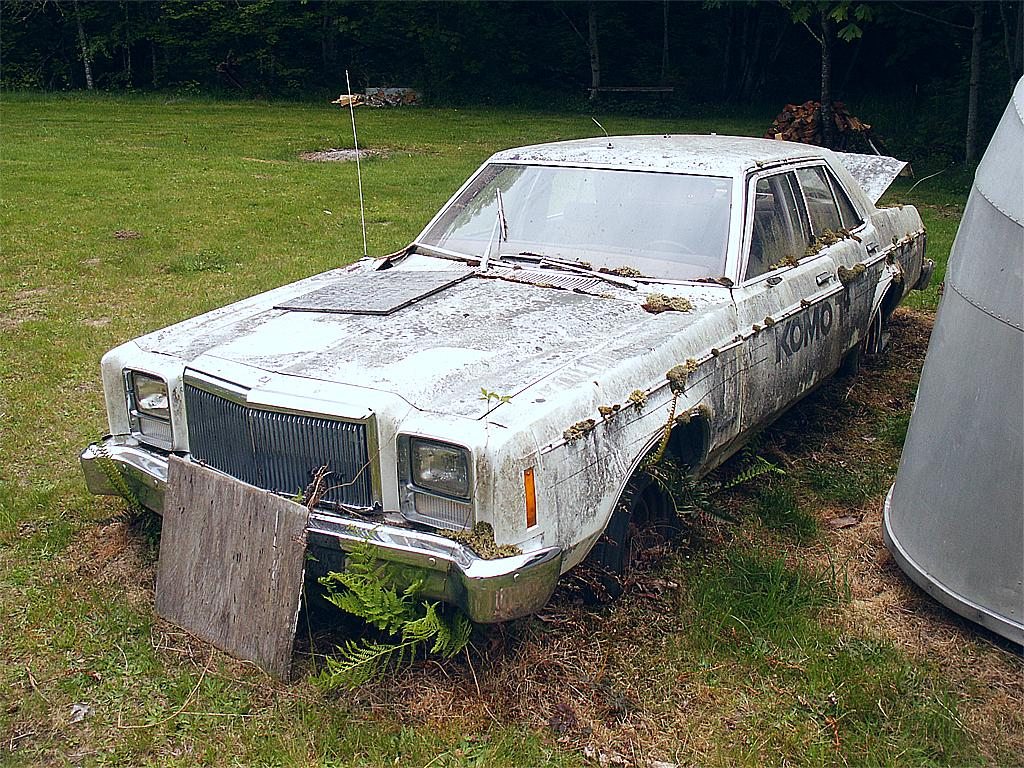
The remains of a Mercury Monarch owned by KOMO-TV that was involved in the 1980 eruption of Mount St. Helens

KOMO-TV nearly lost one of its staff in the volcanic eruption of Mount St. Helens on May 18, 1980. Dave Crockett, who had been with the station since 1975, had been covering the mountain every day for three weeks until being rotated out a few days prior. On the morning of May 18, he woke up at 3:00 a.m. in Seattle on a hunch that he would get some impressive video that day, and loaded up his news car and headed towards Mount St. Helens without anyone at KOMO knowing about it. He arrived at the mountain just as it was erupting. His news video, which shows an advancing ash cloud and mud flows down the South Fork Toutle River, was made famous by its eleven-minute long "journey into the dark", six of those minutes of which were recorded in "total darkness" as Crockett narrated to what he thought would be his "last day on Earth". His video made worldwide news and was used in a movie remake of the disaster starring Art Carney. The car he drove, with the remains of KOMO lettering still visible, is now a part of a Mount St. Helens Volcano Museum just outside Toutle.

=== 1984–present ===
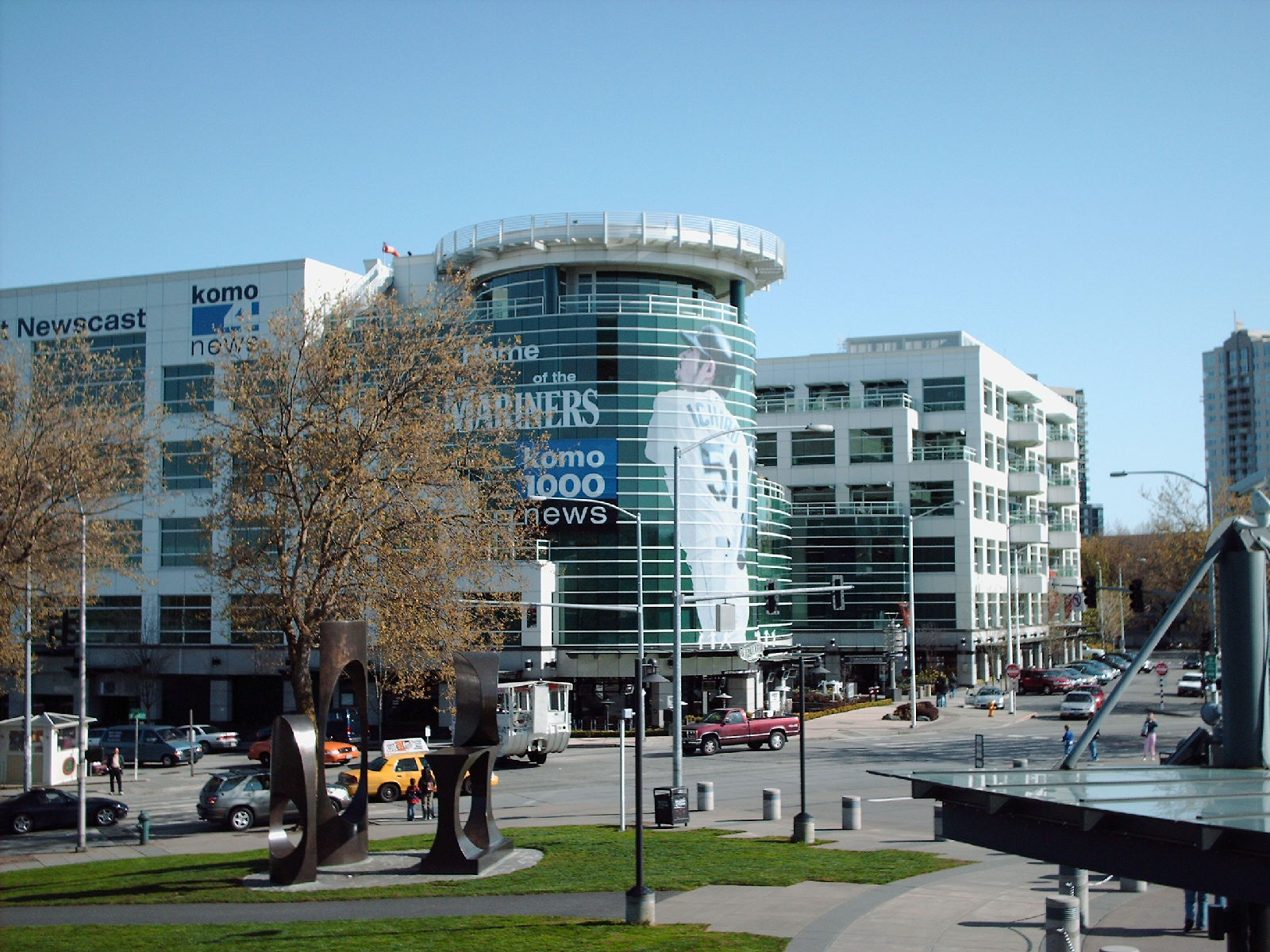
KOMO's present broadcast facility, formerly known as Fisher Plaza, completed in 2001. The broadcast portion of the complex was opened in June 2000.

In 1984, KOMO became the first television station to broadcast daily programming in full stereo sound.

In 1994, KOMO applied for the first test license for broadcasting new high-definition signals. KOMO began broadcasting a high-definition digital signal in 1997; on May 18, 1999, KOMO became the first television station in the United States to broadcast its daily newscasts in high definition. This statement, however, comes into conflict with a claim made by WFAA in Dallas (a sister station to KING-TV) that it is the first station in the nation to broadcast its daily news programs in high definition, on February 28, 1997. It also conflicts with WRAL-TV in Raleigh, North Carolina.

On July 2, 2009, a large electrical fire that started in an electrical vault at the Fisher Plaza complex at 11:15 p.m. that evening knocked KOMO off the air during its 11 p.m. newscast.

On April 10, 2013, Sinclair Broadcast Group announced that it would acquire Fisher Communications for $373.3 million. However, the deal was subjected to financial scrutiny; the law firm Levi & Korsinsky notified Fisher shareholders with accusations that Fisher's board of directors were breaching fiduciary duties by "failing to adequately shop the Company before agreeing to enter into the transaction", and Sinclair was underpaying for Fisher's stock. Shortly after the announcement, a lawsuit was filed by a Fisher shareholder. On August 6, the shareholders voted to approve the sale, after they approved that the shareholders would get $41 per share. The Federal Communications Commission (FCC) granted approval of the deal on August 6, and the sale was consummated on August 8. Prior to the sale, KOMO-TV had been the last television station in the Seattle market to be owned by local interests, having been built by Fisher from the ground up.

On March 18, 2014, KOMO-TV's news helicopter crashed at the Seattle Center, as it was taking off from Fisher Plaza around 7:40 a.m., falling onto at least one car. A second car and pickup truck, also involved, caught fire. Fuel from the crashed helicopter, which was leased to the station by St. Louis-based Helicopters Inc. and was also used by KING-TV under a Local News Service agreement, ran down Broad Street (along and south of the crash site), later bursting into flames. Helicopter pilot Gary Pfitzner and photographer Bill Strothman were both killed in the crash. A 37-year-old man in one of the cars was also critically injured, reportedly suffering burns covering up to 20% of his body (revised from an earlier report of burns at up to 50%) according to the Seattle Fire Department. The Eurocopter AS350 B2 helicopter involved in the crash, FAA registration number N250FB, had been leased to KOMO-TV while technical upgrades were being made to the station's own helicopter.

On September 27, 2015, KOMO introduced a new studio for its newscasts, which was designed by Devlin Design Group—Sinclair's primary set design firm. The new design contains nods to Seattle's scenery, including tribal designs on the floor, a desk inspired by whale pods, as well as a helicopter blade—serving as a memorial to Pfitzner and Strothman.

On May 8, 2017, Sinclair Broadcast Group entered into an agreement to acquire Tribune Media—owner of Fox affiliate KCPQ (channel 13) and MyNetworkTV affiliate KZJO (channel 22)—for $3.9 billion, plus the assumption of $2.7 billion in debt held by Tribune, pending regulatory approval by the FCC and the U.S. Department of Justice's Antitrust Division. As KOMO and KCPQ rank among the four highest-rated stations in the Seattle−Tacoma market in total day viewership and broadcasters are not currently allowed to legally own more than two full-power television stations in a single market, the companies would have been required to sell either the KOMO/KUNS or the KCPQ/KZJO duopolies to another station group in order to comply with FCC ownership rules preceding approval of the acquisition; however, a sale of either station to an independent buyer was dependent on later decisions by the FCC regarding local ownership of broadcast television stations and future acts by Congress. After speculation that Sinclair would keep KOMO-TV and KUNS-TV and sell KCPQ and KZJO to Fox Television Stations, it announced on April 24, 2018, that it would keep KOMO-TV, buy KZJO and sell KCPQ and KUNS-TV. KUNS-TV was to be sold to Howard Stirk Holdings, with Sinclair continuing to provide services to the station, while KCPQ was to be sold to Fox Television Stations, making KCPQ a Fox owned-and-operated station; with the cancellation of the deal, KCPQ and KZJO instead went to Nexstar Media Group in September 2019, only to be sold to Fox in March 2020.

On July 18, 2018, the FCC voted to have the Sinclair–Tribune acquisition reviewed by an administrative law judge amid "serious concerns" about Sinclair's forthrightness in its applications to sell certain conflict properties. Three weeks later on August 9, Tribune announced it would terminate the Sinclair deal, intending to seek other mergers and acquisitions opportunities.

In September 2021, radio sister stations KOMO (1000 AM and 97.7 FM), KVI (570 AM), and KPLZ-FM (101.5) were sold to Lotus Communications, leaving KUNS-TV as the sole sister station to KOMO-TV in Seattle; KOMO-TV and KOMO radio were separated after 68 years with the sale. Sinclair retained full control over the KOMO call sign; on February 2, 2022, Lotus changed KOMO radio's call sign to KNWN, though it continues to maintain a partnership with KOMO-TV, and the Lotus stations have not departed KOMO Plaza.

On September 1, 2023, the station's second subchannel began to carry The CW temporarily, replacing KSTW, after CBS News and Stations exercised its option to withdraw its affiliations with the network after Nexstar acquired a majority stake. The subchannel continued to carry programming from Comet in all other time periods. On January 1, 2024, KUNS-TV discontinued its Univision affiliation (which moved to Bellingham-licensed KVOS-TV) and became the new affiliate of The CW for the Seattle market.

== Programming ==
KOMO-TV and its Portland sister station KATU (also built by Fisher and signed-on in 1962) were the only two ABC stations in the contiguous United States which aired Monday Night Football on a one-hour delay, from the program's start in 1970 until 1995, in order to accommodate early evening newscasts on both stations. When the Seattle Seahawks joined the NFL in 1976, the stations modified this arrangement in order to broadcast Monday Night Football games involving the Seahawks live. In 1996, after years of fan protests, both KOMO-TV and KATU began clearing the entire Monday Night Football schedule live, regardless of the teams that were playing each week. A decade later, the program moved to cable on ESPN, though ABC began to simulcast select games with ESPN in 2020, along with NFL Wild Card playoff games starting in 2015. KOMO-TV aired the Seahawks' appearance in Super Bowl XL.

KOMO produces Seattle Refined, a lifestyle newsmagazine program that contains advertorial content.

=== News operation ===
KOMO-TV presently broadcasts 45 hours of locally produced newscasts each week (with seven hours each weekday and five hours each on Saturdays and Sundays).

For the last three decades, KOMO has competed directly with KING-TV for first place in the Seattle news ratings. KOMO continually places first among the local newscasts in the market.

==== Awards ====
KOMO-TV's news division has consistently won awards for its reporting, and averages more wins per year than any Seattle television station. The station won the Edward R. Murrow Award for "Best Large Market Newscast" In both 2002 and 2008. In June 2008, KOMO was awarded 15 regional Emmy Awards, taking top honors in the "Station Excellence", "Morning News", "Evening News", "Breaking News" and "Team Coverage" categories. KOMO anchor/reporter Molly Shen won the prestigious Individual Achievement Award for the second time in three years, and longtime anchor Kathi Goertzen took home a Silver Circle Award, in recognition of her 25+ years with the station. The station also won the Emmy Award for "Breaking News Coverage". A segment on The Fabulous Palm Springs Follies (Palm Springs, California) received an Emmy in 1997.

==== Controversy ====
In March 2019, KOMO-TV aired a news special entitled Seattle is Dying. This special documented the ongoing drug and homelessness crisis in Seattle and included interviews with residents, business owners, a former police chief, and several homeless people. The documentary and KOMO-TV were criticized by other media following the broadcast. The Seattle Times contested the piece, publishing a rebuttal that April which countered that Seattle's crime rates are actually significantly lower than the 1980s and 1990s. A subject of the documentary piece reported, when later interviewed, that he had been misrepresented.

==== On-air staff ====
KOMO-TV's Kathi Goertzen in a screengrab from a 1989 report on the Berlin Wall takedown

KOMO anchors Dan Lewis, Kathi Goertzen, and weather forecaster Steve Pool had the third-longest tenure of an anchor team in the United States, having served as KOMO's evening news team from 1987 to 2009. The station's evening newscast has long been co-anchored by Lewis and Goertzen, and was praised by the Seattle Post-Intelligencer as being the "best first-string anchor unit in town".

Following the presidential inauguration ceremony in 1993, Lewis became the first reporter to interview then-President Bill Clinton, which occurred at the White House.

===== Notable current on-air staff =====
- Shannon O'Donnell – chief meteorologist

===== Notable former on-air staff =====
- Kathi Goertzen – anchor and special assignment reporter (1980–2012)
- Keith Jackson – reporter, later sportscaster (1954–1964)
- Eric Johnson – anchor (1993–2024)
- Dan Lewis – anchor (1987–2014)
- Lori Matsukawa – anchor (1980–1983)
- Steve Osunsami – reporter (1996–1997)
- Steve Pool – chief meteorologist (1977–2019)
- Bill Schonely – sportscaster (1955–1959, worked alongside Keith Jackson)
- Ken Schram – reporter and commentator (1977–2012)
- John Seigenthaler Jr. – anchor and reporter
- Jim Snyder – anchor and reporter (1994–1998)

== Technical information ==
=== Subchannels ===
The station's signal is multiplexed:

Subchannels of KOMO-TV
Subchannel	Res.	Short name	Programming
4.1	720p	KOMO	ABC
4.2	480i	Comet	Comet
4.3	480i	Charge!	Charge!
51.1	1080i	KUNS	The CW (KUNS-TV)

Broadcast on behalf of another station

=== Analog-to-digital conversion ===
KOMO-TV shut down its analog signal, over VHF channel 4, on June 12, 2009, as part of the federally mandated transition from analog to digital television. The station's digital signal remained on its pre-transition UHF channel 38, using virtual channel 4.

In 2009, KOMO-TV became one of four television stations in the country to be the first to launch mobile DTV signals. The Open Mobile Video Coalition chose KOMO and independent station KONG (channel 16), and WPXA-TV and WATL in Atlanta to beta test the ATSC-M/H standard, which has since been officially adopted for free-to-air digital broadcast television with clear reception on mobile devices, which overcomes the defects of the original ATSC standard.

== Canadian and out-of-market coverage ==
KOMO-TV is available to most cable subscribers in the Vancouver–Victoria, British Columbia, area as the ABC affiliate and is one of five Seattle television stations seen in Canada on the Bell Satellite TV and Shaw Direct satellite services. It is also seen out-of-market on Charter Spectrum in Ellensburg (part of the Yakima DMA), with ABC programming and some syndicated shows blacked out due to the presence of local affiliate KAPP.
