= Biz Kids =

American educational television series

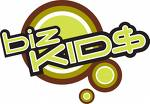
- Starring: Lauren Dupree, Kaelon Horst, Maia Lee, Alexander Oki, Amanda Powers, Miriam Schwartz, Austin Siedentopf, Devon Stark, Christina Marie Taylor, Catherine Thompson, Elizabeth Wright, Pat Cashman, John Keister
- Country of origin: United States
- Original language: English
- No. of seasons: 6
- No. of episodes: 71

Production
- Executive producers: Jeannine Glista, Erren Gottlieb, Jamie Hammond, James McKenna
- Running time: 26 minutes
- Production company: WXXI

Original release
- Network: Local PBS stations (2008-2017)
- Release: January 6, 2008 – June 20, 2017

Biz Kids (stylized as biz KID$) is an American educational television series that teaches financial education and entrepreneurship to kids and teenagers. It uses sketch comedy, musical guests, guest and special guest appearances, and young actors to explain basic economic concepts. Its motto is "Where kids teach kids about money and business." Biz Kids has been described as comparable to KING-TV's Almost Live!, and is similar in format to CBC Television's Street Cents.

== Production ==
Biz Kids was created by the producers (Bill Nye the Science Guy), the Emmy Award winning science show from the 1990s. Comedy sketches, spoofs of mostly old TV shows and movies, commercial parodies, and silly antics are performed by a cast of Seattle teenage actors. Jamie Hammond served as executive producer. Jeannine Glista served as a co-producer.

== Cast ==
The Biz Kids cast is made up largely of teenage actors from the Seattle area. Writer John Keister also has small recurring roles.

Biz Kids is about a group of high school teenagers and one middle school preteen teaching kids about money and others, and they have also been friends since childhood (preschool to high school).

The original cast members were Lauren Dupree, Kaelon Horst, Bob Jones, Maia Lee, Alexander Oki, Amanda Powers, Miriam Schwartz, Austin Siedentopf, Devon Stark, Christina Taylor, and Elizabeth Wright.

=== Hosts ===
- Lauren (The Hip Hop Dancer), aka "The Popular Girl", a teenage girl who has her two childhood best pals Maia and Kaelon. She is a 17-year-old girl at Seattle Academy of Arts and Sciences because she loves theater, dance, and music. She is the most popular girl and theater girl in Seattle with her popular friends. She is Austin's dreamy childhood girlfriend. She had her popular attendance records when she was in preschool to kindergarten. She was voted "Miss Popularity", "Best Dressed", "Most Pretty Girl", "Best Popular Teen" and others when she was 14, 15, or 16 years old in her freshman, sophomore, or junior year of high school in 2004, 2005, or 2006. Her idols are Beyoncé, Scary Spice, Raven Symone, and more idols. She is the leader of her Theater Arts team at Seattle Academy of Arts & Sciences. She is Lizzie's adoptive older sister. From her senior year of high school in season 1 to her college days in season 5. The show ended when Lauren was 21 years old and she graduated from Howard University, By the sixth season, she was a 30-something woman. She starred in a movie called Crossroads when she was a young child in middle school. Her parents got married. She is 17 years old in Season 1, 18 years old in Season 2, 19 years old in Season 3, 20 years old in Season 4, and 21 years old in Season 5.
- Kaelon (The Smooth and Suave Boy), aka, "The Jock/Popular Girl's Pal", Lauren's best male friend since childhood. She met him in the 1990s. He is a 17-year-old guy at South Kitsap High School where he loves to play basketball. He is smooth and suave, and he is Austin's adopted brother. He is a leader of The Biz Squad (a parody of The Mod Squad) with his childhood female friends Lauren and Maia. He had braces until later episodes. He appeared in episodes of the South Kitsap High School show Wolf Tracks. The show ended when Kaelon was 21 years old, and he graduated from the University of California, Los Angeles, He is a leader of the South Kitsap High School basketball team and later the University of California, Los Angeles basketball team. His idol are his idols. And by the sixth season, he was a 30-something man. He married his wife in the future. He starred in the short film Driver's Ed when he was 15 years old in his sophomore year of high school. His parents got married. He is 17 years old in Season 1, 18 years old in Season 2, 19 years old in Season 3, 20 years old in Season 4, and 21 years old in Season 5.
- Maia (The Friend Lover), aka "The Popular Girl's Other Pal", Lauren's best female friend since childhood, the second youngest of the Biz Kids. They met her in the early 2000s. She is a 14-year-old girl at her high school where she loves shopping, music, and friends. She's like a younger sister to Alex. Her idols are Marie Osmond, Selena Gomez, Sporty Spice, and more. She was wearing so many different flats that they were better than her shoes. She got ended by the third season when Maia was 16. From her freshman year of high school in season 1 to her junior year in season 3. She starred as a young girl in the film Max Rules! when she was 11 or 12 years old in the sixth or seventh grade and as an orphan in a silent movie, Brand Upon the Brain! when she was 13 in the eighth grade from her middle school days. Her parents got married. She is 14 years old in Season 1, 15 years old in Season 2, and 16 years old in Season 3.
- Alex (The Language Speaker), aka "The Smart Boy", He is a 17-year-old guy at Lakeside School where he is learning different languages. He's like an older brother to Maia. They met him from preschool to their sophomore year. His idols are Donny Osmond, David Henrie, and more idols. He is Amanda's love interest. He is a leader of Alex's Angels (a parody of Charlie's Angels), with his female childhood friends Amanda, Miriam, and Christina. The show ended when Alex was 21 years old, and he graduated from Yale University. From his junior year of school in season 1 to his college days in season 5. By the sixth season, he was a 30-something man. He played baseball. He starred as Woody in a ReAct Theater production of Six Degrees of Separation when he was just 16 years old. His parents got married. He is 17 years old in Season 1, 18 years old in Season 2, 19 years old in Season 3, 20 years old in Season 4, and 21 years old in Season 5.
- Amanda (The Attention Girl), aka "The Second Popular Girl," is an 18-year-old girl at her high school when she is friendly and outgoing. She likes to pay attention. She is the oldest of Biz Kids. Her idols are Britney Spears, Madonna, Baby Spice, and more idols. She is one of Christina's childhood best friends from Pre-K to their high school days. She is Alex's love interest and Austin's former girlfriend/ex-girlfriend. The show ended when Amanda was 22 years old, and she graduated from college. From her high school days in season 1 to her college days in season 5. She has her friends from her past when she was a little girl. Now she has her own friends. Her parents got married. She is 18 years old in Season 1, 19 years old in Season 2, 20 years old in Season 3, 21 years old in Season 4, and 22 years old in Season 5.
- Miriam (The Funny People Laugher), aka "The Funniest One," is a 17-year-old girl at Roosevelt High School where she makes people laugh. Her idols are Cher, Posh Spice, and more. She is one of Christina and Amanda's childhood best friends. She is also Lizzie’s childhood best friend from Pre-K to high school. She’s the princess of theater drama and others like Lauren. She's like a sister to Alex and Maia. The show ended when Miriam was 21 years old, and she graduated from University of Minnesota. By the sixth season, she was in her mid-20s. She married her friend Adam in Oregon in the future. She had her own comedy shows, funny shows and her smart times when she was a kid. From her high school years in season 1 to her college days in season 5. Her parents got married. She is 17 years old in Season 1, 18 years old in Season 2, 19 years old in Season 3, 20 years old in Season 4, and 21 years old in Season 5.
- Austin (The Pranker Boy), aka "The Prankster," is a 15- or 16-year-old guy at Issaquah High School where he enjoys teaching kids, and he played football. He is Alex's best friend/childhood best friend. His idols are Drake Bell, Zac Efron, and more. He is Kaelon's adopted brother. He moved to Nashville then moved to Seattle. He is Lauren's dreamy childhood boyfriend and Amanda's former boyfriend/ex-boyfriend. The show ended when Austin was 20 years old, and he graduated from the University of Washington. From his sophomore years in high school in season 1 to his college days in season 5. He had his attending rules when he was a kid. His parents got married. He is 15-16 years old in Season 1, 17 years old in Season 2, 18 years old in Season 3, 19 years old in Season 4, and 20 years old in Season 5.
- Devon (The Tae Kwon Do Boy), aka "The Karate Biz Kid," is a 12-year-old 7th grader at his middle school where he enjoys karate and taekwondo. He is the youngest of the Biz Kids. His idols are Michael Jackson and more. He is Lauren and Lizzie's adoptive younger brother. The show ended when Devon was 16. From his middle school days in season 1 to his junior year of high school in season 5. He has his friends from his childhood. He was having his kung fu trophy when he was a kid. His parents got married. He is 12 years old in Season 1, 13 years old in Season 2, 14 years old in Season 3, 15 years old in Season 4, and 16 years old in Season 5.
- Christina (The Perfectionist), aka "The Smartest Perfectionist," is a teenage girl with her glasses from her school, where she is the perfectionist. She is one of Amanda & Miriam's childhood best friends. Her idols are Ginger Spice and more. The show ended when she was a young adult; she lost a couple of pounds from her weight loss, her diet and exercises, and she graduated from college. She had her own daily exercises when she was a little girl to her early, mid, and late teens. From her high school days in seasons 1 to 3 to her college days in seasons 4 and 5. She lost weight, and her healthy diet plan is great for her. Her parents got married. From her teenage years to her college years.
- Lizzie (The Creative Girl), aka "The Clothing Designing Girl," is a teenage girl from her high school who loves to make clothes, prom dresses, and others. She is another one of Christina & Amanda's childhood best friends. She is also Miriam’s childhood best friend. She is Lauren's adoptive younger sister. Her idols are Kyla Pratt and more. She had her own fashion plan when she was younger. She is a leader of Get Lizzie Love! (a parody of Get Christie Love!) The show ended when she was a young adult and graduated from college. From her high school days in season 1 to her college days in season 5. She made clothing designs when she was little. Her parents got married. From her teenage years to her college years.

=== Guest stars ===
- Judith Levine, an author of Not Buying It!
- Ace Young, an American Idol finalist
- Richard Karn, Home Improvement star and the fourth host of Family Feud from 2002 to 2006.
- Brie Larson, an actress who needs to wear her clothes in Hollywood, California.
- Cymphonique Miller, an actress, singer, dancer, and rapper who makes Byou.
- Tracey Conway, Steve Wilson, Nancy Guppy, and more of John Keister and Pat Cashman's former Almost Live! cast members.
- Jeff Bezos, Amazon.com founder.

== Sketches ==
- All My Investments, a parody of the soap opera on ABC, All My Children. Featured in two episodes: "Saving and Investing for Your Future" and "Bulls, Bears, and Financial Markets".
- The No-Sale Zone, a parody of the television series The Twilight Zone. Featured in an episode "Sell, Sell, Sell (The Science of Sales)".
- Mr. Squeezya Card, a commercial parody of the Visa card. Featured in an episode "Using Your Credit-Crazy or Compelling?".
- As the Economy Turns and As the Budget Turns, both parodies of the CBS soap opera As the World Turns. Featured in two episodes.
- The Adventures of Compulsive and Compare Kid, Amanda and Miriam as two teenage girls named Compulsive and Compare Kid to look at the newest phone ever. Featured in an episode "How to Be a Smart Consumer".
- Banks of Our Lives, a parody of the soap opera on NBC, Days of Our Lives. Featured in an episode "Take it to the Bank!".
- Gus Greenback: Gumshoe Detective, a 15- or 16-year-old teenage detective named Gus Greenback (Austin Siedentopf) has all the money clues to his friends, a pretty popular rich girl named Darla Dollar (Miriam Schwartz) and his assistant Sergeant Sawbuck (Lauren DuPree) solving some entrepreneur files during the mid to late 1940s and early 1950s in Seattle.
- Tooth Fairy Tales: It follows a fairy named Tooth Fairy (Austin Siedentopf), who gives money to the fairy's friends in their beds and waved the wand with magical dust, so they put them to sleep.
- Film, television spoofs, and other comedy sketches are featured in some episodes.

== Lost Sketches ==
- Fairy Tale Money Tips, a sketch starring Snow White (Maia Lee), Cinderella (Amanda Powers), Aladdin's princess (Lauren DuPree), and other cast members, played fairy tale characters who have money tips.
- Besties with Cash!, a sketch starring two best friends Stacey (Miriam Schwartz) and Jessica (Elizabeth Wright) who talks about fashion, beauty, money, schools, and other things with co-hosts Katie (Maia Lee), Stacey's younger sister, Debbie (Lauren DuPree), Jessica's older sister, Natalie (Christina Taylor), Darcy (Amanda Powers), and other cast members.
- Super Biz Kids, a fictional superhero team like the Avengers and Justice League who battles villains and fights crime that makes the city of Seattle their way. The team leader, Princess Glitter (Lauren DuPree), her team, Thunder Boy (Alexander Oki) and Lightning Girl (Maia Lee), two teenage superhero siblings, Destroyer Dude (Kaelon Horst), Kung Fu Boy (Devon Stark), Flammo Dude (Austin Siedentopf), Plant Girl (Amanda Powers), Pixie Dust Girl (Christina Taylor), Wind Girl (Miriam Schwartz), and Snow Girl (Elizabeth Wright) with the villains Dr. Andy, the Queen of Hounds, The Banker, and other villains. Other superheroes and supervillains are included.
- Seattle Money Beat, a talk show from Seattle where three co-hosts, Melissa (Lauren DuPree), Kelly (Maia Lee), and Brian (Kaelon Horst), talk about dollars, coins, and all of the stuff, similar to Northwest Afternoon, with their co-hosts Jack (Alexander Oki), Nicholas (Austin Siedentopf), Sarah (Amanda Powers), Gretchen (Christina Taylor) and other co-hosts.
- Money Saver Films, a parody of educational films from the 1950s to the 1990s because they teach about money and other things. Films such as Cash: What a Payday!, The Right Time to Make Money, and others.
- The Charlie, Trisha, and Lori Radio Show, a sketch starring teenage radio personalities Charlie Crowne (Kaelon Horst), Trisha Clint (Lauren DuPree), and their co-host, Lori Wainwright (Maia Lee), talks through topics like beauty, clothing, and others.
- How to Survive a Payday, a parody of the NBC soap opera How to Survive a Marriage.
- Boyz4+Girlz6, a teen pop band similar to Backstreet Boys, Spice Girls, All Saints and similar bands.
- The Lindsay Heinebart Show, a talk show sketch starring Lindsay Heinebart (Maia Lee), a parody of Cindi Rinehart, when she talks about money, fashion, makeup, accessories, electronics, and others, she has special guests.
- The What Keeps Me Booth, a sketch featuring everyone from the What Keeps Me Booth.
- Skiers Earn Interest, a sketch featuring a group of kid and teenage skiers skiing on Mount Rainier together and they learn about interest.
- The High Fiving Pretty Girls, a sketch, features a group of excessively, young and old, popular, teenage girls with high self-esteem who "go out on the town" all over Seattle, with their friends.
- They Are The Kids, a parody of We Are the World.
- The Witches of Seattle, four teenage witches talking about money and other things, can also cast spells like Powerful than a nerd, turn Claire into a bird!, Brilliant than a frog, turn Andy into a dog!, along with their monster friends.
- The Wrestledolphs!, a wrestling family with money, are attacking them and whooping them, Papa and Mama Wrestledolph giving out money to their children with their referee.
- All My Investments: 60 Year Anniversary, the hostess looks back at All My Investments episodes from the past decades from the 1950s to 1990s.
- Better Eating Through Saving Money, Alex, Miriam, and Maia play three teenage siblings named Jerry, Nicolette, and Deborah, demonstrating their families and friends’ money recipes.
- Heritage Moments of Money, some many sketches have the heritage moments of money and others from past all the way to the present.
- Pop-culture references, from I Love Lucy and Gilligan's Island to Saved by the Bell to The Addams Family.
- Halloween Sketches, Biz Kids has so many Halloween sketches like:
- The Monster Biz Kids, Lauren is a witch who is casting spells, Austin is a werewolf, Kaelon is a vampire, Devon is a mummy, Maia is a teen zombie, Lizzie is Medusa, Amanda, Christina, and Miriam are teenage witchy sisters who are also casting spells, Alex is a teenage Frankenstein with a featured cast member as a teenage bride of Frankenstein, Claire is a ghoulish girl, and other cast members as monsters.
- Zom-Biz Kids, the hosts and extras of Biz Kids as zombies, while Pat Cashman and John Keister are being scared by a zombie couple.

The Curse of Mercer Street, The Haunted Studio, and other Halloween sketches.

- Christmas Sketches, Biz Kids has many Christmas sketches.
- Holiday Sketches, Biz Kids has every sketch from New Year's Eve to Christmas.
- Biz Kids Halloween Special Sketches, it has every sketch from the Biz Kids dressed up as monsters such as witches, vampires, ghosts, werewolves, zombies, mummies, gorgons, fly monsters, sea monsters, vampire girls, mad scientists, Frankenstein's monsters, grim reapers and more monsters to The Biz Kids Family, a parody of The Addams Family, to other Halloween sketches.
- Pop Star Sketches, Biz Kids have pop stars sketches from the Backstreet Boys, Madonna, Spice Girls to All Saints and other pop stars.

== Broadcasting ==
Biz Kids is produced in association with WXXI of Rochester, NY, and is distributed by American Public Television in the United States. It started airing on local PBS stations on January 6, 2008. Shortly after launching, the show achieved a reach of 118 million households, and by June 2008, the show was airing on 311 of 343 PBS stations. By early 2009, the show was broadcast on 334 PBS stations, accounting for 97% of public television channels in the United States. After six seasons, the show concluded on June 20, 2017. As of 2024, reruns continue to air on select PBS stations, and the series is also aired on commercial broadcast syndication.

The show also aired in the United Kingdom on the Simply Money channel and also aired in Canada on the Knowledge Network.

== Curriculum ==
A free curriculum is available for download for use by teachers and parents to use in classrooms, afterschool programs and at home. Each episode has a specially designed curriculum with activities, reviews and tests, all of which comply with the National Endowment for Financial Education standards. Five core Biz Kids lesson plans are available in Spanish.

== Reception ==
According to the scholar Renee Hobbs, Biz Kids employs "a clever blend of entertainment and education" and gives "a fast-paced mix that includes actors, sketch comedies, animation, and feature stories featuring young entrepreneurs". In a positive review, Emily Ashby of Common Sense Media called the series "a great choice" for parents to watch with their children, stating that the children in the series could teach the adults valuable money lessons. She concluded, "Corny though some of the playful content might seem to the grown-ups, it's nonetheless effective in getting its messages about fiscal responsibility across to kids." The Seattle Times writer Florangela Davila stated, "From its funky theme song to the wacky sketches, the tone is Nyesque, which is to say: hip, zany and smart."
