= List of Bill Nye the Science Guy episodes =

Bill Nye the Science Guy is an American science education television program created by Bill Nye, James McKenna, and Erren Gottlieb, with Nye starring as a fictionalized version of himself. The show aired in syndication from September 10, 1993, to February 5, 1999, over the course of six seasons and 100 episodes; beginning in season 2, a concurrent run was added on PBS from October 10, 1994, to September 3, 1999, with the show's first run remaining in syndication.

The production codes were taken from the United States Copyright Office. Airdates were taken from the Newspaper Archives. The Sioux City, Iowa NBC affiliate of KTIV is an example of a station that carried the show in syndication.

== Series overview ==
Season	Episodes	Originally released		
Season	Episodes	First released	Last released	Network
Pilots		February 24, 1991	April 14, 1993	KOIN-TV; KCTS-TV
1	26	September 10, 1993	March 25, 1994	Syndication
2	26	September 9, 1994	April 28, 1995	Syndication/PBS
3	13	September 8, 1995	December 1, 1995	Syndication/PBS
4	13	September 6, 1996	April 25, 1997	Syndication/PBS
5	14	September 5, 1997	April 24, 1998	Syndication/PBS
6	8	September 4, 1998	February 5, 1999	Syndication/PBS

== Episodes ==
=== Pilots (1991–93) ===
No. overall	No. in season	Title	Original release date	Prod. code
0A	0A	"Bill Nye the Science Guy"	February 24, 1991 (KOIN-TV)	N/A
The series' first pilot, produced by KOIN-TV and distributed by All-American Television.
0B	0B	"Water"	April 14, 1993 (KCTS-TV)	N/A
The series' second pilot, broadcast in select markets between April 22 and May 31.

=== Season 1 (1993-94) ===
No. overall	No. in season	Title	Original syndication air date	Original PBS air date	Prod. code
1	1	"Flight"	September 10, 1993	October 10, 1994	#BN-01
"Soundtrack of Science" Parody song: Nyevana – "Smells Like Air Pressure" – Parody of "Smells Like Teen Spirit" by Nirvana
2	2	"Earth's Crust"	September 17, 1993	October 11, 1994	#BN-02
"Soundtrack of Science" Parody song: Magmadonna – "Crust" – Parody of "Vogue" by Madonna
3	3	"Dinosaurs"	September 24, 1993	October 12, 1994	#BN-03
"Soundtrack of Science" Parody song: J.C. – "Mr. Dino" – Parody of "Mr. Wendal" by Arrested Development
4	4	"Skin"	October 1, 1993	October 13, 1994	#BN-04
N/A
5	5	"Buoyancy"	October 8, 1993	October 14, 1994	#BN-05
"Soundtrack of Science" Parody song: Sure Floats-a lot – "Bill's Got Boat" – Parody of "Baby Got Back" by Sir Mix-a-Lot
6	6	"Gravity"	October 15, 1993	October 17, 1994	#BN-06
"Soundtrack of Science" Parody song: Attraction Action – "G-R-A-V-I-T-Y" – Parody of "Twilight Zone" by 2 Unlimited
7	7	"Digestion"	October 22, 1993	October 18, 1994	#BN-07
"Soundtrack of Science" Parody song: Dy Gestion – "Can't Eat This" – Parody of "Can't Truss It" by Public Enemy
8	8	"Phases of Matter"	October 29, 1993	October 19, 1994	#BN-08
"Soundtrack of Science" Parody song: Phaze Change – "Solid Liquid Gas" – Parody of "Rebirth of Slick (Cool Like Dat)" by Digable Planets
9	9	"Biodiversity"	November 5, 1993	October 20, 1994	#BN-09
"Soundtrack of Science" Parody song: Bio Di Versity – "We're all Connected" – Parody of "Connected" by Stereo MC's
10	10	"Simple Machines"	November 12, 1993	October 21, 1994	#BN-10
"Soundtrack of Science" Parody song: The Pulley Ramp Five – "ABC's of Machinery" – Parody of "ABC" by The Jackson 5
11	11	"The Moon"	November 19, 1993	October 24, 1994	#BN-11
"Soundtrack of Science" Parody song: The Lunatics – "Moon Cycle" – Parody of "Bicycle Race" by Queen
12	12	"Sound"	November 26, 1993	October 25, 1994	#BN-12
"Soundtrack of Science" Parody song: Gloria Wavelength and the Vibrations – "Sound is a VIBE" – Parody of "I Will Survive" by Gloria Gaynor
13	13	"Garbage"	December 3, 1993	October 26, 1994	#BN-13
"Soundtrack of Science" Parody song: Trash E. Trash – "R.E.C.Y.C.L.E." – Parody of "Respect" by Aretha Franklin; artist name is a parody of Doug E. Fresh
14	14	"Structures"	December 10, 1993	October 27, 1994	#BN-14
"Soundtrack of Science" Parody song: Stress N' Tension – "Let's Talk About Stress" – Parody of "Let's Talk About Sex" by Salt-N-Pepa
15	15	"Earth's Seasons"	January 7, 1994	October 28, 1994	#BN-15
"Soundtrack of Science" Parody song: A Tilted Development – "Rhyme and Season"; artist name is a parody of Arrested Development
16	16	"Light & Color"	January 14, 1994	October 31, 1994	#BN-16
"Soundtrack of Science" Parody song: The Bent Wavelengths – "Light and Colour" – Parody of "Sweating Bullets" by Megadeth
17	17	"Cells"	January 21, 1994	November 1, 1994	#BN-17
"Soundtrack of Science" Parody song: Mighty Chondria – "Cellular Haze" – Parody of "Purple Haze" by Jimi Hendrix
18	18	"Electricity"	January 28, 1994	November 2, 1994	#BN-18
"Soundtrack of Science" Parody song: Billy Ray Cyrcuits – "AC/DC Charge" – Parody of "Achy Breaky Heart" by Billy Ray Cyrus
19	19	"Outer Space"	February 4, 1994	November 3, 1994	#BN-19
"Soundtrack of Science" Parody song: Elvi Centuri – "Celestial Hotel" – Parody of "Heartbreak Hotel" by Elvis Presley
20	20	"Eyeball"	February 11, 1994	November 4, 1994	#BN-20
"Soundtrack of Science" Parody song: The Eye Doctors – "Two Eyes" – Parody of "Two Princes" by The Spin Doctors
21	21	"Magnetism"	February 18, 1994	November 7, 1994	#BN-21
"Soundtrack of Science" Parody song: N.S. Kool J. – "Opposites Attract" – Parody of "Jump" by Kriss Kross; artist name is a parody of LL Cool J
22	22	"Wind"	February 25, 1994	November 8, 1994	#BN-22
"Soundtrack of Science" Parody song: Wind Dee – "Wind Is in Your Hair" – Parody of "Groove Is in the Heart" by Deee-Lite
23	23	"Blood & Circulation"	March 4, 1994	November 9, 1994	#BN-23
"Soundtrack of Science" Parody song: AB+ – "Blood Stream" – Parody of "Love Shack" by The B-52's
24	24	"Chemical Reactions"	March 11, 1994	November 10, 1994	#BN-24
Bill Nye gets poofed and pops a balloon with hydrogen and air. "Soundtrack of Science" Parody song: Chemical Reactions – "Don't Try This at Home" – Parody of "State of Attraction" by Paula Abdul
25	25	"Static Electricity"	March 18, 1994	November 11, 1994	#BN-25
"Soundtrack of Science" Parody song: The Sticky Socks – "Static Electricity" – Parody of "Turning Japanese" by The Vapors
26	26	"Food Web"	March 25, 1994	November 14, 1994	#BN-26
"Soundtrack of Science" Parody song: Food Webby Web – "(It's The) Food Web" – Parody of "Who Am I (What's My Name)?" by Snoop Doggy Dogg

=== Season 2 (1994–95) ===
No. overall	No. in season	Title	Original syndication air date	Original PBS air date	Prod. code
27	1	"Light Optics, Bending"	September 9, 1994	December 5, 1994	#BN2-01
"Soundtrack of Science" Parody song: Queen Lighteefa – "B.E.N.T." – Parody of "U.N.I.T.Y." by Queen Latifah
28	2	"Bones & Muscles"	September 16, 1994	December 6, 1994	#BN2-02
"Soundtrack of Science" Parody song: Steppenbone – "Bones in My Body" – Parody of "Born to Be Wild" by Steppenwolf
29	3	"Oceanography"	September 23, 1994	December 7, 1994	#BN2-03
"Soundtrack of Science" Parody song: Gulfstream Girls – "Deep Ocean Currents" – Parody of "California Girls" by The Beach Boys
30	4	"Heat"	September 30, 1994	December 8, 1994	#BN2-04
"Soundtrack of Science" Parody song: LeHot – "LeHeat" – Parody of "Le Freak" by Chic
31	5	"Insects"	October 7, 1994	December 9, 1994	#BN2-05
"Soundtrack of Science" Parody song: UB Buggy – "Jah Mon, Insects Rule" – Style Parody of UB40
32	6	"Balance"	October 14, 1994	December 12, 1994	#BN2-06
"Soundtrack of Science" Parody song: Torquer – "Balance This" – Parody of "Get Off This" by Cracker
33	7	"The Sun"	October 21, 1994	December 13, 1994	#BN2-07
"Soundtrack of Science" Parody song: Deep Yellow – "My Favorite Star" – Parody of "Highway Star" by Deep Purple
34	8	"Brain"	October 28, 1994	December 14, 1994	#BN2-08
"Soundtrack of Science" Parody song: En Lobe – "Whatta Brain" – Parody of "Whatta Man" by En Vogue with Salt-N-Pepa
35	9	"Forests"	November 4, 1994	December 15, 1994	#BN2-09
"Soundtrack of Science" Parody song: John Cougar Loggincamp – "Second Growth" – Style Parody of John Mellencamp
36	10	"Communication"	November 11, 1994	December 16, 1994	#BN2-10
"Soundtrack of Science" Parody song: Mary Chapin Communicator – "How Can We Communicate?" – Parody of "He Thinks He'll Keep Her" by Mary Chapin Carpenter
37	11	"Momentum"	November 18, 1994	December 19, 1994	#BN2-11
"Soundtrack of Science" Parody song: Momentisey – "The Faster You Push Me" – Parody of "The More You Ignore Me, the Closer I Get" by Morrissey
38	12	"Reptiles"	November 25, 1994	December 20, 1994	#BN2-12
"Soundtrack of Science" Parody song: No music video – the commercial-free PBS version of the episode, however, had a brief spoof entitled "Cold Blooded". – Parody of "Hot Blooded" by Foreigner
39	13	"Atmosphere"	December 2, 1994	December 21, 1994	#BN2-13
"Soundtrack of Science" Parody song: Warm -n- Wetta – "Fresh Aire"; artist name is a parody of Salt-N-Pepa
40	14	"Respiration"	January 6, 1995	TBA	#BN2-14
"Soundtrack of Science" Parody song: Ali Veoli – "What A Pair" – Style Parody of Tatyana Ali
41	15	"Planets & Moons"	January 13, 1995	TBA	#BN2-15
N/A
42	16	"Pressure"	January 20, 1995	TBA	#BN2-16
"Soundtrack of Science" Parody song: PSI Garden – "Pressure" – Parody of "Spoonman" by Soundgarden
43	17	"Plants"	January 27, 1995	TBA	#BN2-17
"Soundtrack of Science" Parody song: Rhoda Dendron – "Cross Pollination" – Parody of "Human Behaviour" by Björk
44	18	"Rocks & Soil"	February 3, 1995	TBA	#BN2-18
"Soundtrack of Science" Parody song: Sedimentary Fools – "Rocks Rock Harder" – Parody of "Basket Case" by Green Day
45	19	"Energy"	February 10, 1995	TBA	#BN2-19
"Soundtrack of Science" Parody song: The ERG's – "N-R-G" – Parody of "So What'cha Want" by the Beastie Boys
46	20	"Evolution"	February 17, 1995	TBA	#BN2-20
"Soundtrack of Science" Parody song: Evolver – "Survival" Style parody of "Seether" by Veruca Salt
47	21	"Water Cycle"	March 24, 1995	TBA	#BN2-21
"Soundtrack of Science" Parody song: J.A.C. – "Water Cycle Jump" – Parody of "Jump" by Kris Kross
48	22	"Friction"	March 31, 1995	TBA	#BN2-22
"Soundtrack of Science" Parody song: Grace Slip – "Friction Happens"; artist name is a parody of Grace Slick
49	23	"Germs"	April 7, 1995	TBA	#BN2-23
"Soundtrack of Science" Parody song: Dose of Soap – "Just Wash Your Hands" – Parody of "Don't Turn Around" by Ace of Base
50	24	"Climates"	April 14, 1995	TBA	#BN2-24
"Soundtrack of Science" Parody song: Climate Report – "Whether the Weather" – Parody of "Lucas with the Lid Off" by Lucas Secon
51	25	"Waves"	April 21, 1995	TBA	#BN2-25
"Soundtrack of Science" Parody song: Big Amplitude – "Baby I Love Your Wave" – Parody of "Baby, I Love Your Way" by Big Mountain (originally by Peter Frampton)
52	26	"Ocean Life"	April 28, 1995	TBA	#BN2-26
"Soundtrack of Science" Parody song: James Baleen – "Power to the Plankton" Style Parody of James Brown

=== Season 3 (1995) ===
No. overall	No. in season	Title	Original syndication air date	Original PBS air date	Prod. code
53	1	"Mammals"	September 8, 1995	TBA	#BN2-27
"Soundtrack of Science" Parody song: Fake Fur – "Jennifer's A Mammal" – Parody of "Institutionalized" by Suicidal Tendencies
54	2	"Spinning Things"	September 15, 1995	TBA	#BN2-28
"Soundtrack of Science" Parody song: House of Spin – "Spin Around" – Parody of "Jump Around" by House of Pain
55	3	"Fish"	September 22, 1995	TBA	#BN2-29
"Soundtrack of Science" Parody song: Salmon Dave – "I'm a Sole Man" – Parody of "Soul Man" by Sam & Dave
56	4	"Human Transportation"	September 29, 1995	TBA	#BN2-30
"Soundtrack of Science" Parody song: Carpoolio – "Move Groove" – Parody of "Fantastic Voyage" by Coolio
57	5	"Wetlands"	October 6, 1995	TBA	#BN2-31
"Soundtrack of Science" – Parody song: Maria and the Mudflats – "Where the Land is Wet"
58	6	"Birds"	October 13, 1995	TBA	#BN2-32
"Soundtrack of Science" Parody song: LL Bloo J. – "Talkin' Bout Birds"; artist name is a parody of LL Cool J
59	7	"Populations"	October 20, 1995	TBA	#BN2-33
"Soundtrack of Science" Parody song: Shirell Crow – "All We Need To Do" – Parody of "All I Wanna Do" by Sheryl Crow
60	8	"Animal Locomotion"	October 27, 1995	TBA	#BN2-34
"Soundtrack of Science" Parody song: Bjorn Turun – "Loco Motion" – Parody of "Everything Zen" by Bush
61	9	"Earthquakes"	November 3, 1995	TBA	#BN2-38
"Soundtrack of Science" Parody song: Mistah Richter – "Earthquake Rumble" – Parody of "Insane in the Brain" by Cypress Hill
62	10	"NTV Top 11 Countdown"	November 10, 1995	TBA	#BN2-39
"Soundtrack of Science" – Parody song: Mudhoney – "Bill Nye The Science Guy Theme"
63	11	"Nutrition"	November 17, 1995	TBA	#BN2-36
Bill discusses what it means to have a healthy diet, and also talks about nutrients like carbohydrates, and how they keep your body healthy. "Soundtrack of Science" Parody song: Knute Trishan – "Good Food" Style Parody of Nine Inch Nails/Trent Reznor
64	12	"Marine Mammals"	November 24, 1995	TBA	#BN2-37
"Soundtrack of Science" Parody song: Marina Cesealia – "Breathe Like Me" – Parody of "I Know" by Dionne Farris
65	13	"Rivers & Streams"	December 1, 1995	TBA	#BN2-35
"Soundtrack of Science" Parody song: Talking Headwaters – "Take Me to the River" – Parody of "Take Me to the River" by Talking Heads

=== Season 4 (1996–97) ===
No. overall	No. in season	Title	Original syndication air date	Original PBS air date	Prod. code
66	1	"Spiders"	September 6, 1996	TBA	#066
"Soundtrack of Science" Parody song: Foo Spighters – "This is A Spiders Life" – Parody of "This Is a Call" by Foo Fighters
67	2	"Pollution Solutions"	September 13, 1996	TBA	#067
No music video
68	3	"Probability"	September 20, 1996	TBA	#068
"Soundtrack of Science" Parody song: Steven Odd – "50 Fifty" – Parody of "Loser" by Beck
69	4	"Pseudoscience"	September 27, 1996	TBA	#069
"Soundtrack of Science" Parody song: Dare L. Pseudo – "Pure Proof" – Parody of "100% Pure Love" by Crystal Waters
70	5	"Flowers"	October 25, 1996	TBA	#070
"Soundtrack of Science" Parody song: Daisy Birdsenbees – "So Many Flowers"
71	6	"Archaeology"	November 8, 1996	TBA	#071
"Soundtrack of Science" Parody song: Mob Barley – "Diggin'" – Parody of "Jamming" by Bob Marley
72	7	"Deserts"	November 15, 1996	TBA	#072
"Soundtrack of Science" Parody song: Deserette – "Always Dry" – Parody of "You Oughta Know" by Alanis Morissette
73	8	"Amphibians"	November 22, 1996	TBA	#073
"Soundtrack of Science" Parody song: P-Swamp All Stars with DJ Hoppy – "The Amphidelic Mothership Metamorphosis" Style – Parody of George Clinton the P-Funk All Stars
74	9	"Volcanoes"	January 31, 1997	TBA	#074
"Soundtrack of Science" Parody song: Volcanique – "Lavaflows" – Parody of "Waterfalls" by TLC
75	10	"Invertebrates"	February 7, 1997	TBA	#075
"Soundtrack of Science" Parody song: S. Khar Go – "Crawl Away" – Parody of "Runaway" by Janet Jackson
76	11	"Heart"	February 14, 1997	TBA	#076
"Soundtrack of Science" Parody song: Vinny Vein and the Pumpers – "Gimme Back My Heart"
77	12	"Inventions"	February 21, 1997	TBA	#077
"Soundtrack of Science" Parody song: En Vent and the Process – "It's An 'ing Thing"
78	13	"Computers"	April 25, 1997	TBA	#078
"Soundtrack of Science" Parody song: La Binary – "One Zero 001" – Parody of "Be My Lover" by La Bouche

=== Season 5 (1997–98) ===
No. overall	No. in season	Title	Original syndication air date	Original PBS air date	Prod. code
79	1	"Fossils"	September 5, 1997	TBA	#079
"Soundtrack of Science" Parody song: Etchton Stone – "Fossil Man" – Parody of "Rocket Man" by Elton John
80	2	"Space Exploration"	September 12, 1997	TBA	#082
"Soundtrack of Science" Parody song: The Space Princess of Galactic Grooviness – "Planets All" – Parody of "Set U Free" by Planet Soul
81	3	"Forensics"	September 19, 1997	TBA	#081
"Soundtrack of Science" Parody song: Crime Seen – "We Will Find You" – Parody of "We Will Rock You/We Are the Champions" by Queen
82	4	"Time"	September 26, 1997	TBA	#080
"Soundtrack of Science" Parody song: The Tim E. Zone Experience – "Time Time Time Time Time..." – Parody of "Time Has Come Today" by The Chambers Brothers
83	5	"Genes"	October 17, 1997	TBA	#083
"Soundtrack of Science" Parody song: Alice in Genes – "It's Called Genetics" Parody of "Killing in the Name" by Rage Against the Machine'; artist name is a – Parody of Alice in Chains
84	6	"Architecture"	October 24, 1997	TBA	#084
"Soundtrack of Science" Parody song: The Artist Formerly Known as Archie T. – "Makin' Plans" – Parody of "All Mixed Up" by 311; artist name is a Parody of The Artist Formerly Known As Prince
85	7	"Farming"	October 31, 1997	TBA	#085
"Soundtrack of Science" Parody song: Chris Ballew – "Farm Food" – Parody of "Peaches" by The Presidents of the United States of America, of which Ballew himself is a member
86	8	"Life Cycles"	November 14, 1997	TBA	#086
"Soundtrack of Science" Parody song: Roberta Fungi – "Everything Has A Life Cycle" – Parody of "Killing Me Softly" by Roberta Flack
87	9	"Do-It-Yourself Science"	November 21, 1997	TBA	#087
"Soundtrack of Science" Parody song: Nye & The Family Crust – "Do It Yourself Science" Parody of "Hell" by Squirrel Nut Zippers; artist name is a – Parody of Sly and the Family Stone, and Hallelujah Chorus
88	10	"Atoms"	February 6, 1998	TBA	#088
"Soundtrack of Science" Parody song: Third Nye Blind – "Atoms in My Life" – Parody of "Semi Charmed Life" by Third Eye Blind
89	11	"Ocean Exploration"	February 13, 1998	TBA	#089
"Soundtrack of Science" Parody song: The Posies – "Voyage of the Aquanauts" A – Parody of their 1993 song "Flavor of the Month". The Posies are an alternative rock group from Bellingham, Washington.
90	12	"Lakes & Ponds"	February 21, 1998	TBA	#090
"Soundtrack of Science" Parody song: The Froggy Boyz – "Fond of Lakes and Ponds" Parody of "Tha Crossroads" by Bone Thugs-n-Harmony
91	13	"Smell"	February 28, 1998	TBA	#091
"Soundtrack of Science" Parody song: Turbinator Two – "Come on Use Your Brain (Smell This)" – Parody of "C'mon N' Ride It (The Train)" by Quad City DJ's
92	14	"Caves"	April 25, 1998	TBA	#092
"Soundtrack of Science" Parody song: Batilda & Guano – "Cave Thing" – Parody of "Shake Your Groove Thing" by Peaches & Herb

=== Season 6 (1998–99) ===
No. overall	No. in season	Title	Original syndication air date	Original PBS air date	Prod. code
93	1	"Comets & Meteors"	September 4, 1998	TBA	#095
"Soundtrack of Science" Parody song: Halley Comet – "Got Me Looking" – Parody of "Shadowboxer" by Fiona Apple
94	2	"Fluids"	September 11, 1998	TBA	#093
"Soundtrack of Science" Parody song: Weflo – "Drip it" – Parody of "Whip It" by Devo
95	3	"Storms"	September 18, 1998	TBA	#096
"Soundtrack of Science" Parody song: Mighty Mighty Thundertones – "Stormin" Style – Parody of The Mighty Mighty Bosstones
96	4	"Erosion"	September 25, 1998	TBA	#094
"Soundtrack of Science" Parody song: Earth, Wind & Ice – "Causing the Erosion" Style – Parody of No Doubt; artist name is a Parody of Earth, Wind & Fire
97	5	"Music"	October 30, 1998	TBA	#099
"Soundtrack of Science" Parody song: "There's Science in Music" – Melodic Style Similar To That Of "The Time Warp" by Richard O'Brien
98	6	"Measurement"	November 13, 1998	TBA	#097
"Soundtrack of Science" Parody song: The Meter Men – "Every Measurement You Make" – Parody of "Every Breath You Take" by The Police
99	7	"Patterns"	November 20, 1998	TBA	#098
"Soundtrack of Science" Parody song: Downward Spiral – "Patterns of Joy" – Parody of "Breathe" by The Prodigy; artist name reference to Nine Inch Nails.
100	8	"Motion"	February 5, 1999	TBA	#100
"Soundtrack of Science" Parody song: Slow Moe – "All in Motion" – Parody of "Hot for Teacher" by Van Halen
