= Steve Wilson (director) =

American television director

Steve Wilson is an independent television director, based in Seattle, Washington, USA. He also appeared on-air as a cast member of Almost Live! the hit sketch comedy show on KING-TV and Comedy Central during the 1990s.

Wilson most recently directed Northwest Afternoon on KOMO-TV. He was also involved with the PBS program The Eyes of Nye.

In late June 2005, Wilson appeared on Northwest Afternoon, filling in for “Queen of Soaps” Cindi Reinhart. Wilson and his fellow cast-mates on Almost Live! often lampooned Northwest Afternoon’s soap segments during the show's run (including a joke about Reinhart during the September 2005 reunion special). Wilson is currently directing New Day Northwest, a daily studio based talk show with a live studio audience. The show's executive producer is Tracey Green and the host is Margaret Larson. Coincidentally, the show is produced in the same studio Almost Live! was produced during its 15-year run.

In 2013, Wilson began directing episodes of The [206], a new Seattle-based sketch comedy show starring Almost Live! alumni John Keister, Pat Cashman, and Chris Cashman. Wilson has also appeared on-screen in two sketches.
