= The Eyes of Nye =

Television series

- Presented by: Bill Nye
- Narrated by: Pat Cashman
- Country of origin: United States
- No. of seasons: 1
- No. of episodes: 13

Production
- Production locations: Seattle, Washington
- Production company: Buena Vista Television

Original release
- Network: KCTS-TV
- Release: April 3 – June 26, 2005

The Eyes of Nye is a science program that aired on public television in the United States in 2005 and featured Bill Nye. The show had an older target audience than its predecessor Bill Nye the Science Guy, aimed more toward adults and teenagers than children. The creation of the show was motivated by the success of Bill Nye the Science Guy, as well as a widespread contempt among scientists for scientific journalism in the media. The program was based in Seattle, Washington, produced by Buena Vista Television, and broadcast during Prime time by KCTS, the local PBS affiliate.

== Recurring segments ==
- Straight Talk: Parodies interview shows like Larry King Live. The guest is always a deep-voiced, overbearing senator whose opinion fluctuates quite wildly with each question.
- Opinions Now with Chris David: Parodies "debate" shows like Hardball with Chris Matthews. The host is very loud, constantly leans forward and glares at the camera, and demands solid answers, or at least strong opinions, at all times. Taking a jab at modern television news shows, the more level-headed and cautious experts are often ignored in favor of other guests with more extreme and livid views on the subject at hand.
- Science with Mr. Sanders: Parodies 1950s-era educational films. Mary and Tommy, stereotypical period school children, ask questions to their teacher, Mr. Sanders. His answers are usually laden with his personal prejudices and disturbing information about his personal life. The characters make Meta humor by implying that The Eyes of Nye is merely an educational film they are watching.
- The Hippy Couple: Parodies New Age views on science, featuring a stereotypical hippie couple who ramble on at length about love, ecological produce, and global warming. In the end, the couple really only appear to be interested in growing hemp, which is expected from the show's stereotypical portrayal of them.

== Episodes ==
No.	Episode title & topic	Original release date
1	"Astrobiology"	April 3, 2005
Does extraterrestrial life exist? How are we working to find it, and what will happen if we do? Bill meets people who are hunting for aliens, visits a "Martian" landscape right here on Earth, and talks with one of astronomy's premier planet finders.
2	"Pseudoscience"	April 10, 2005
Extraordinary claims require extraordinary proof. And to be scientific, a claim or hypothesis must be able to be proven false. Bill exposes techniques used by psychics, explains the science of walking on a bed of flaming coals, and investigates "The Case of the Extraordinary Claim".
3	"Addiction"	April 17, 2005
Bill examines the controversial question of whether addiction is a disease. Segments focus on doctors who seek to better understand addictive behaviors by studying: brain chemistry, psychology, and social factors; individuals who live with substance abuse issues; and scientists who are working to identify the genes that may lead to addiction.
4	"Cloning"	April 24, 2005
The possibilities of cloning reach far beyond creating genetically exact duplicates of animals or human beings. The same techniques could potentially be used to cure diseases or repair damaged organs. Bill talks with a developmental biologist about why cloning animals is so difficult, shows how cloning works, and visits a lab where stem cells are used to repair damaged spinal cords.
5	"Nuclear Energy"	May 1, 2005
With evidence of global warming mounting, Americans are revisiting the idea of nuclear energy. It's a clean energy source that can be produced domestically, but dealing with the waste remains a major hurdle. To find out whether the benefits are worth the risks, Bill visits a nuclear reactor and the Yucca Mountain, NV site where the U.S. government wants to store nuclear waste.
6	"Sports"	May 8, 2005
Bill explores the physics of a variety of sports, from the 100-meter sprint of Olympic champion Maurice Green to the cat-like reactions of U.S. women's soccer goalie Hope Solo.
7	"Population"	May 15, 2005
Bill explains what birth and death rates mean and looks at population issues around the world, from demographics to social and cultural aspects, to discover how education and industrialization can affect population. Field reports include stories about population trends in the Third World, a look at consumption trends, and an analysis of mass-media education methods such as soap operas that feature population issues.
8	"Race"	May 22, 2005
Bill explores why people of different skin colors look so different on the outside when the DNA on the inside is so similar, then has his own DNA sequenced to find out what he can determine about his "race".
9	"Antibiotics"	May 29, 2005
The battle between microbes and humans is far from over. In fact, deaths from infectious diseases have increased since the 1980s. Some of the rises is due to new "bugs" such as HIV and hepatitis C, but the alarming increase in antibiotic resistance is also responsible. Bill talks with experts at the Centers for Disease Control and Prevention about new narrow-spectrum antibiotics and "bacteriocins" and demonstrates just how important hand-washing really is in the fight against germs.
10	"Genetically Modified Foods"	June 5, 2005
Through genetic engineering, scientists can pull off such outrageous-sounding feats as crossing a tomato with a flounder. In fact, more than half of the foods on grocery store shelves now—even infant formula—have been genetically modified in some way. But do we really know yet whether they are safe for humans and the environment? Bill hears the various sides of this controversial issue by talking to traditional wheat breeders, organic agriculture researchers, and corporate genetic engineers.
11	"Transportation"	June 12, 2005
Bill examines the problem of pollution from transportation—which has outstripped manufacturing to become America's largest source of air pollution—by tracing the historical roots of American car culture, trying out some cutting-edge traffic simulation software, and exploring the promise of fuel-efficient cars and state-of-the-art hydrogen technology.
12	"Global Climate Change"	June 19, 2005
The world is getting warmer. Is it our fault? Is the rise in temperature a product of the Industrial Revolution, the burning of fossil fuels, and the modern propensity for driving down to the mini-mart in a car the size of a woolly mammoth? Or is it just part of a natural global cycle? Bill investigates with a visit to the National Ice Core Laboratory in Denver, where scientists identify and evaluate atmospheric gases from 400,000 years ago, and a demonstration of how increased levels of carbon dioxide affect temperatures on Earth.
13	"Evolution of Sex"	June 26, 2005
Why sex? For one thing, with sex, we're trying to stay ahead of the germs that are always attacking us. With one act of mixing our genes through sexual reproduction, there are millions of new possible combinations to help fight off the parasites. Includes an explanation of the relationship between sex and parasites, an experiment in which women use scent to detect subtle genetic differences in men, and a discussion of the risks organisms take in reproducing sexually rather than asexually.

== History ==
Following the success of Bill Nye the Science Guy, Nye began work on a comeback project, The Eyes of Nye, aimed at an older audience and tackling more controversial science topics such as genetically modified food, global warming and race. However, "shifting creative concepts, infighting among executives, and disputes over money with Seattle producing station KCTS" delayed production for years. KCTS was hampered by budgetary problems and couldn't produce a show pilot on time. "KCTS went through some distress", Nye recalled. "When we did The Eyes of Nye, the budget started out really big, and by the time we served all these little problems at KCTS, we had a much lower budget for the show than we'd ever had for the 'Science Guy' show which was made several years earlier." PBS declined to distribute The Eyes of Nye, and it was eventually picked up by American Public Television. "PBS wanted more serious, in-depth Nova-style shows", explained co-producer Randy Brinson. The show, which eventually premiered in 2005, lasted only one season. Nye acknowledged that omitting his bow tie on the program was a mistake. "I tried wearing a straight tie. It was nothing," Nye said. "We were trying something new. It wasn't me."

== Personnel ==
Bob Nelson and Pat Cashman, members of the sketch comedy television show Almost Live!, of which Bill Nye was also a member, made guest appearances. Cashman was also the voice of the announcer for Nye's previous show Bill Nye the Science Guy. The show was directed by Emmy Award-winning, Steve Feldman and Almost Live! director & cast member Steve Wilson.
