= Bill Nye the Science Guy =

American science education television program

- Genre: Science education Sketch comedy
- Created by: Bill Nye; James McKenna; Erren Gottlieb
- Presented by: Bill Nye
- Starring: Michaela Leslie-Rule; Chais Dean; Suzanne Mikawa; Ivyann Schwan; Jaffar Smith
- Narrated by: Pat Cashman
- Theme music composer: Mike Greene
- Opening theme: "Bill Nye the Science Guy"
- No. of seasons: 5
- No. of episodes: 100 (+1 pilot) (list of episodes)

Production
- Executive producers: Elizabeth Brock; Erren Gottlieb; James McKenna
- Producer: Simon Griffith
- Production locations: Seattle, Washington
- Running time: 30 minutes
- Production companies: KCTS Seattle; Walt Disney Television; Rabbit Ears Productions; McKenna/Gottlieb Producers, Inc.

Original release
- Network: Syndicated; PBS (1994–1999)
- Release: September 10, 1993 – June 20, 1998

Bill Nye the Science Guy is an American science education television program created by Bill Nye, James McKenna, and Erren Gottlieb, with Nye starring as a fictionalized version of himself. It was produced by Seattle public television station KCTS and McKenna/Gottlieb Producers, and distributed by Buena Vista Television with substantial financing from the National Science Foundation.

The show aired in syndication from September 10, 1993, to February 5, 1999, producing a total of six seasons and 100 episodes; beginning with its second season, a concurrent run of the series began airing on PBS from October 10, 1994, and ran until September 3, 1999, as it continued to be distributed in commercial first-run syndication. After the show's first run was completed, Nye continued to portray the Science Guy character for a number of short interstitial segments for the Noggin cable channel that aired during reruns of the show. A video game based on the series was released in 1996, and a subsequent television show aimed at adults, Bill Nye Saves the World, ran from 2017 to 2018 on Netflix.

Known for its quirky humor and rapid-fire MTV-style pacing, the show was critically acclaimed and was nominated for 23 Emmy Awards, winning 19. Studies also found that people that viewed Bill Nye regularly were better able to generate explanations and extensions of scientific ideas than non-viewers.

== Format ==
Nye portrays a hyper-kinetic, tall, and slender fictionalized version of himself wearing a blue lab coat and a bow-tie. He combines the serious science of everyday things with fast-paced action and humor.

Each half-hour show begins with a cold open, where Nye introduces the episode's theme, which leads into an opening credit sequence, and featuring Nye in a computer-animated scientific world, along with his head spinning, radio frequencies, and plastic toy dinosaurs flying. In later seasons, the theme song was cut short by a static screen. After the opening credits (in most episodes), announcer Pat Cashman says "Brought to you by...", in which a product name is related to the episode's theme.

Nye walks onto the set, which is called "Nye Laboratories", filled with scientific visuals including many "of science" contraptions announced dramatically, relevant to the theme of the episode. Science-related TV and movie parodies configure the facts of the episode's theme, along with parodies of TV commercials.

The show has featured many guest appearances. (Note: Guest appearances included: Christopher Walken; Samuel L. Jackson; Harrison Schmitt; Jenna von Oÿ; Robin Leach; John Ratzenberger; Ross Shafer; Graham Kerr; Gene Siskel; Roger Ebert; Bob Ross; Willard Scott; Richard Karn; Soundgarden; Kenny G; Pat Sajak; Vanna White; Cirque Du Soleil; Suzanne Somers; The Flying Karamazov Brothers; John Keister; Candace Cameron; Alfonso Ribeiro; Sinbad; Edgar Martínez; Nate McMillan; Mudhoney; Drew Barrymore; Al Gore; Taran Noah Smith) Each episode features Nye visiting many places relating to the episode's theme, showing interviews of people talking about their work and other contributions. At the end of each episode, Nye thanks the viewers for watching, before explaining in a clever description of a theme's activity. The closing credits roll over bloopers from the episode.

=== Segments ===
- Way Cool Scientist: An expert discusses the fact of the episode's theme.
- Consider the Following: Nye discusses a certain aspect of the episode's theme.
- Nifty Home Experiment: A viewer demonstrates a simple home experiment.
- Try This: A viewer presents a simple demonstration.
- Hey! Look at This: An expert gives a closer look into the episode's theme.
- Check it Out: A viewer affects their environmental issues.
- Clever Science Trick: A viewer demonstrates a simple science trick.
- The Jackie Smazz Show: Pat Cashman performs an act as a talk show host named Jackie Smazz.
- Great Moments in Science: Cashman narrates a historical event in science.
- Great Moments in Communication: Cashman narrates a historical event in communication.
- Great Moments in Momentum: Cashman narrates historical events in momentum.
- Pet Rock Theater: Animated pet rocks perform an act.
- Better Eating Through Kitchen Chemistry: Ian G. Saunders portrays Vivian Cupcake demonstrating scientific recipes.
- Richie, Eat Your Crust: Nye and the Family Crust perform an act themed around telling the title boy to "eat your crust".
- Did You Know That...: A factoid is presented.
- Luna Van Dyke, Private Eye: Michaela Leslie-Rule portrays private investigator Luna Van Dyke, who focuses on a story.
- Mind Your Manners with Billy Quan: A martial arts film parody related to the episode's theme, whose title character, portrayed by cameraman Darrell Suto, is based on Bruce Lee. These segments were originally featured on the sketch comedy TV series Almost Live!.
- Soundtrack of Science: A science-themed song parody.

== Episodes ==
Season	Episodes	Originally released		
Season	Episodes	First released	Last released	Network
Pilots		February 24, 1991	April 14, 1993	KOIN-TV; KCTS-TV
1	26	September 10, 1993	March 25, 1994	Syndication
2	26	September 9, 1994	April 28, 1995	Syndication/PBS
3	13	September 8, 1995	December 1, 1995	Syndication/PBS
4	13	September 6, 1996	April 25, 1997	Syndication/PBS
5	14	September 5, 1997	April 24, 1998	Syndication/PBS
6	8	September 4, 1998	February 5, 1999	Syndication/PBS

== History ==
=== Origins and creation ===
External videos
- First appearance of Bill Nye the Science Guy on YouTube via KING-TV

Bill Nye was originally an engineer for the 747 airliner at Boeing, having moved to Seattle in 1977 after he was accepted for the position. Nye began to perform stand-up comedy in his spare time after he entered and won a Steve Martin lookalike contest at a comedy club, which led to him meeting fellow comedians Ross Shafer and John Keister. Nye eventually left Boeing in 1985 to join Shafer and Keister in writing and performing for Almost Live!, a then-fledgling sketch comedy television show produced by local NBC affiliate KING-TV. During his tenure on the show, Nye began cultivating a science-explaining TV persona; the first instance of the persona occurred in 1985 when Nye called Shafer on-air to correct his pronunciation of the word "gigawatt", to which Shafer retorted, "Who do you think you are – Bill Nye the Science Guy?" As a result, Nye was subsequently asked to give scientific answers to the show's call-in questions. His persona's first on-air appearance, as it is contemporarily known, occurred on January 8, 1987, by circumstance when the primary guest for that night's performance of Almost Live! called in to cancel their appearance; with no backup guest planned to fill the resulting empty time, the show's writers elected to have Nye demonstrate the household uses of liquid nitrogen. During the demonstration, Nye submerged an onion in liquid nitrogen and proceeded to shatter it, receiving acclaim from the studio audience.

As Nye produced more demonstrations for Almost Live!, he began to develop the idea of a show featuring his "Science Guy" persona; KING-TV declined his proposal, though he eventually received assistance from station alumni James McKenna and Erren Gottlieb. Together, the group pitched the show as Watch Mr. Wizard meets Pee-wee's Playhouse, though the latter part was later replaced with MTV after the arrest of actor Paul Reubens for indecent exposure in 1991. Their pitch lasted for four years, being declined by Fox and other networks over various concerns, until they convinced Elizabeth Brock of local PBS member station KCTS-TV to take a chance on the idea. KCTS-TV commissioned a pilot for Bill Nye the Science Guy, which aired on April 14, 1993, on the station itself before airing on PBS stations nationwide for the rest of the month. Nye successfully obtained underwriting from the National Science Foundation and the U.S. Department of Energy. Nye's program became part of a package of syndicated series that local stations could schedule to fulfill Children's Television Act requirements; because of this, Bill Nye the Science Guy became the first program to run concurrently on both public and commercial stations.

=== Theme song ===
The Bill Nye the Science Guy theme song was written by songwriter and former math teacher Mike Greene, who also sang the "Bill Nye the Science Guy" refrain and the distorted voice saying "Bill Nye the Science Guy". The word "Bill" is repeated throughout as a percussive shout. In developing the theme, Greene first came up with the melody, which he stated was inspired by Danny Elfman and his work with Oingo Boingo. When Greene was enlisted to write the theme song, the show's producers requested that the song "not sound like a kid's show"; the final result was accordingly uncommon for the time. Greene initially sent the theme's producers a demo with Greene singing the theme. Greene then sent two alternate versions with professional singers. The producers ultimately chose to keep Greene's voice as they found it funnier.

Set to a house beat, Greene enlisted rappers to repeat the word "Bill!" as a percussive shout, deliberately imitating the shouting featured in House of Pain's 1992 song "Jump Around". "I can't name them, because it was against their contract to do outside things without permission from their record company," Greene noted. "It was kinda funny, because they were in my studio one day to record a song. I was working on the Nye theme as they walked in and I told them, 'Hey, do me a favor and go in the booth and chant 'Bill, Bill, Bill' over and over again.' They had no idea what it was for, but they're cool, so they did. It sounded great, so that's the version we kept. The show didn't air until a year later, so it wasn't until then that they understood what this was really for." In a comment that Greene posted on Reddit in 2018, Greene mentioned that he believed that the rappers were from several groups in his studio on the day of recording, but the only rapper he could specifically recall was Bronz of A.L.T. & The Lost Civilization. The spoken female vocals were provided by Leslie Kyle-Wilson.

=== Production ===
The show was created in 1992 by Bill Nye, James McKenna and Erren Gottlieb, produced by McKenna/Gottlieb Producers, Inc, in partnership with KCTS in Seattle. The following year, the production companies entered a distribution agreement with Buena Vista Television, a subsidiary of Disney. As part of the agreement, the profits of the show were split between Disney and the production team, with Disney owning full distribution rights across linear television, home video, and digital streaming. McKenna and Gottlieb all met while McKenna was a producer on Almost Live!, a Seattle-based comedy show.

The announcer for the program was Pat Cashman, whom Nye knew from his time on Almost Live!. Before his show launched, Nye had previously worked alongside Christopher Lloyd in Back to the Future: The Animated Series, where he played Doc Brown's assistant and demonstrated several experiments.

The show has been likened to the next-generation version of Watch Mr. Wizard. The show ran about the same time as and covered similar topics to Beakman's World, in fact sharing one crew member, editor/writer/director Michael Gross.

The show was primarily funded by the National Science Foundation, the Corporation for Public Broadcasting and the annual financial support from the viewers/stations of the PBS network. Other funding sponsors included Ore Ida, The Boeing Company (which Nye worked for until 1986, Boeing was also based in Seattle until 2001 when it relocated its corporate headquarters to Chicago, Illinois and later Washington, D.C.), and Intel. The syndicated airings were credited as being "Produced in Association with the National Science Foundation", while the PBS airings changed it to being "Produced in Association with Walt Disney Television".

The show began with a 26-episode order for the 1993–1994 television season. After its initial success, it was renewed for a second 26-episode order for the 1994–1995 season, followed by 13 additional episodes for the 1995–1996 season. In February 1996, it was renewed for two more years, bringing the final episode total to 100. The final episode aired in 1999, well after production ended in 1997.

Despite Disney's association and ownership with the show, it has never aired on any network owned by Walt Disney Television in the United States (such as Disney Channel and ABC, the latter of which Disney would acquire in 1996, three years after the show premiered.)

=== Noggin shorts ===
Nye in one of Noggin's original shorts

In September 1999, Bill Nye signed a multi-year deal to develop and star in original programs for Noggin, a cable channel co-owned by MTV Networks and the Children's Television Workshop (now known as Sesame Workshop). In addition to producing the new content, Noggin acquired all 100 episodes of Bill Nye the Science Guy; this made it the first-ever program acquisition by the channel. Noggin and Nye chose not to develop new episodes of the show, and instead created original shorts featuring Nye, in character and costume from Bill Nye the Science Guy. In the shorts, Nye's "Science Guy" persona worked as the "head sparkologist" of Noggin, and he tried to find out what topics sparked viewers' imaginations. Bill Nye told Multichannel News that he was interested in creating multiple original shows for Noggin, including a math-based series and one "showing kids how to exercise good judgment."

Bill Nye also hosted "Noggin's What Sparks You? Special," a half-hour special that aired on April 7, 2000.

== Impact ==
Logo used for merchandise

In conjunction with the production of Bill Nye the Science Guy, KCTS-TV conducted several research studies that evaluated how effective the program was as an educational tool. In one study, it was found that viewers of the program made more observations and sophisticated classifications than non-viewers. In surveys of elementary students who watched the program, most children concluded that Nye made "kids like science more". When surveyed whether Nye was a scientist or actor and comedian, most students asserted he was a scientist, though many said both. Students also described Nye almost equally as both "funny" and "smart", and believed he was a "source of good information."

== Awards ==
During its run, Bill Nye the Science Guy was nominated for 23 Emmy Awards, winning nineteen.

== Home media ==
Walt Disney Studios Home Entertainment has released every episode individually on DVD, but never released a full series set. Instead, each episode was released separately on its own DVD, for a total of 100 DVDs costing a combined $1,500. In the United Kingdom, it was distributed on VHS by ViewTech, Bristol. In 1994 and 1995, Walt Disney Home Video released five volumes of Bill Nye the Science Guy, such as "The Human Body: The Inside Scoop", "Powerful Forces: All Pumped Up", "Dinosaurs: Those Big Boneheads", "Reptiles & Insects: Leapin' Lizards", and "Outer Space: Way Out There". All five volumes were released on VHS, containing two episodes. As of May 2017, the 1996 episode "Probability" is edited from its original airing, with a segment removed featuring a cast member saying there are only two genders. Netflix denied allegations they edited it (their new series Bill Nye Saves the World features Nye stating gender is on a spectrum) saying "It was delivered to us that way by Buena Vista TV."

A set of 31 episodes is also available for purchase on the iTunes Store, though they have been split into two separate volumes; one containing 14 episodes and the other containing 17 episodes.

Despite Disney's involvement in the series, the series has not been available on Disney+ due to a dispute with Nye over revenue sharing.

== Video game ==
A computer game based on the series, titled Bill Nye: The Science Guy - Stop the Rock!, was released in 1996 for Microsoft Windows and Macintosh by Pacific Interactive.

== See also ==
- Stuff Happens
- The Eyes of Nye
- Carl Sagan
- Universe of Energy – an attraction at Walt Disney World's Epcot starring Bill Nye
- Dinosaur – another Walt Disney World attraction, located in Disney's Animal Kingdom; it features Nye in the queue area via voiceover
- Bill Nye–Ken Ham debate
