= Visioneers =

- Directed by: Jared Drake
- Written by: Brandon Drake
- Produced by: Henry Capanna; Brandon Drake; Jared Drake; James Henney; Jory Weitz
- Starring: Zach Galifianakis; Judy Greer; James LeGros; Mía Maestro; Missi Pyle
- Cinematography: Dino Parks
- Edited by: Justine Halliday
- Music by: Tim DeLaughter
- Production companies: Fireside Film; Mayfly Films
- Release date: June 12, 2008 (Seattle International Film Festival)
- Running time: 94 minutes
- Country: United States
- Language: English

Visioneers is a 2008 satirical science fiction dark comedy directed by Jared Drake, written by Brandon Drake, and starring Zach Galifianakis and Judy Greer. The film premiered on June 12, 2008, and was shot in Seattle and Snoqualmie, Washington and surrounding areas.

== Plot ==
In a dystopian near-future, the Jeffers Corporation is the "largest, friendliest and most profitable business in the history of Mankind," and is driving out a culture of independent thought and intimacy. The corporation and its leader, Mr. Jeffers, claim success is achieved by its strict philosophy of mindless productivity. Jeffers teaches that productivity equals happiness, and the business logo (a middle finger) is the standard greeting in society.

George Washington Winsterhammerman, a descendant of George Washington, is a Level-3 "tunt" employee at the Jeffers Corporation, and is suffering from overeating and impotence as a result of alienation common in this society. George then begins to "suffer from dreams" wherein he is the first president of the United States, beset by the prospect of losing the American Revolutionary War, and contemplating surrender to the British. Winsterhammerman is told by authority figures that dreams are a symptom of stress that leads to spontaneous bodily explosion, an escalating problem across the world.

Despite the government's increasingly intrusive attempts to combat explosions, culminating in mandatory neck-worn "inhibitors" created by the Jeffers Corporation, people including George's co-worker, Todd, continue to explode. After George's friend and superior, Charisma, is fired, George discovers she now works in a café, and meets with her in an attempt to avoid unhappiness. After a brief talk, Charisma confides that she has dreams too, and that they involve George and her running away together.

After his wife and son leave due to their own unhappiness, George is visited by Mr. Jeffers, who says he wants to know why George drew a sunset to encapsulate his vision of the future. Mr. Jeffers is impressed with George, believing him to be a nearly perfect Jeffers Corporation drone, and an ally against an anticipated revolt over the Jeffers way of life. Hoping to help George purge himself of all dreams, thereby ending his anger, pain and desire, he recommends George to kill the thing he loves. George returns to Charisma, who has joined many others in being brainwashed through an inhibitor device. After taking her on a yacht with the intent of killing her, George makes a final attempt to rekindle the intimacy they shared at the café by removing her inhibitor. She initially cannot remember him, but later she recalls him and begins to cry. They embrace. After spending the night with Charisma, George imagines he sees George Washington crossing in a canoe, salutes him, and turns to bask in the sun.

== Cast ==
- Zach Galifianakis as George Washington Winsterhammerman
- Judy Greer as Michelle
- Mia Maestro as Charisma
- Missi Pyle as Sahra
- James LeGros as Julieen
- D. W. Moffett as Jeffers
- Aubrey Morris as Old Jeffers
- Matthew Glave as Rodger
- Chris Coppola as Todd
- Fay Masterson as Cindy
- John Keister as Dr. Knob
- Pat Cashman as Bern Goodman
- Ryan McCann as Mack Luster
- Anthony L. Fuller Jr. as Missionary #2
- Joe Rosati as Jeffers Agent #1
- Mycol Comolli as Jeffers Agent #2

== Release ==
Visioneers had its world premiere at the Seattle Internation Film Festival June 12, 2008. It was also screened at the 2008 Austin Film Festival and Cinevegas. Subscribers to the Zach Galifianakis Newsletter were provided an opportunity to screen the movie from a streaming website. The film was released on DVD July 21, 2009.

== Reception ==
Visioneers holds a 67% fresh rating on Rotten Tomatoes.
