= Nadine Renee =

American musician

- Also known as: Nadine Shamir, Nadine Renee, "Harmony"
- Born: Renee Shamir; February 9, 1972; New York City, US
- Died: December 2, 2004 (aged 32) Miami, Florida, US
- Genres: Electronica, dance
- Occupation: Singer/musician
- Instrument: Vocals
- Years active: 1989–2004
- Formerly of: Planet Soul

Nadine Renee Shamir (February 9, 1972 – December 2, 2004) was an American singer and dance musician. In 1995 her single "Say You'll Stay" was popular in the Miami and Los Angeles radio circuits. In 1996, Shamir worked with Miami DJ George Acosta under the moniker Planet Soul. Their single, "Set U Free" went to #26 on Billboard's top 40 chart, and crossed over to the R&B charts.

== Early life and education ==
Shamir was born in New York City. As an infant, she moved with her mother to Miami, Florida. Shamir traveled the world during her formative years and gained a deep passion for music. At 16, she released her first album on an independent label (she recorded under the name Nadine Renee).

== Music ==
In 1988, Shamir released her debut album Say You'll Stay under the stage name Nadine Renee. After high school, she released a second album called Let's Make Love.

She toured Europe and in the late 1990s recorded an album for MCA, where she worked as a receptionist, which was shelved. The next album Nadine was released by MCA in 1999. The album's first single was "Next To Me". The album was reworked and released on Orchard in 2000 under the title Oasis of Love. She continued painting, writing screenplays, and making music, but began to focus on her personal life.

From the year 2000 on, she released her music on MP3.com (which was the most successful legal music platform at the time) and scored several No 1 hits.

In 2002, she worked with Bad Boy Bill on the track 'Costa Del Sol". The track was remixed by multiple artists and became an international hit.

== Death ==
In January 2003, she married Jon Shamir. On December 1, 2004, she gave birth to their first and only child, a daughter, Liat Nadine Shamir, and died of complications the following day.
