= Seattle Channel =

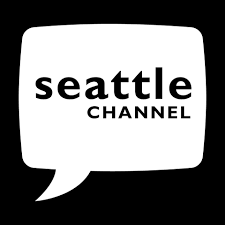
- Broadcast area: Seattle

Programming
- Language: English

Links
- Webcast: Live stream
- Website: www.seattlechannel.org

The Seattle Channel, cable channel 21 in Seattle, Washington, United States, is a government-access television (GATV) channel that operates out of the Seattle City Hall building. It also operates an extensive website. On CenturyLink Prism, Seattle Channel is available on channels 8003 (SD) and 8503 (HD). Seattle Channel provides coverage of select Seattle mayoral news conferences and city council meetings, and produces a wide range of award-winning original content. Feature shows include Art Zone, City Inside Out, CityStream, Civic Cocktail, and Community Stories.

At the 2019 Northwest Emmys, the Seattle Channel brought home five awards, gaining more accolades for well-established programs: Art Zone with Nancy Guppy, and CityStream.

Seattle Channel is a part of the information technology department of the City of Seattle.

== Services ==
The Seattle Channel streams video recorded content on their website and YouTube page 24/7. Programs are archived on the web for future viewing on seattlechannel.org. All content on the Seattle Channel is downloadable and accessible in service to the City of Seattle. According to the city policies, the Seattle Channel and its contents belong to the residents of Seattle.

== Programming ==
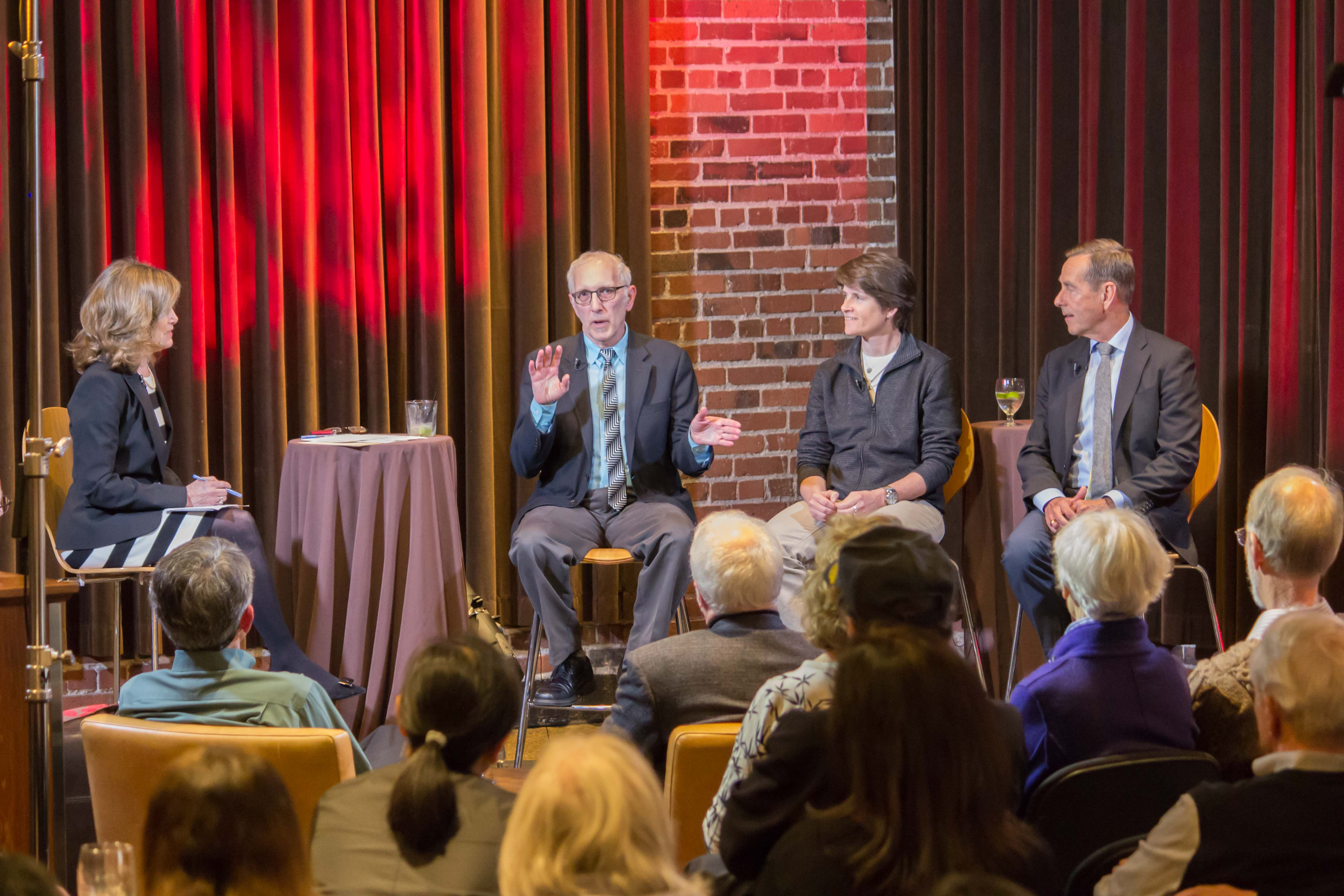
Members of the Seattle City Council interviewed on Seattle Channel show Civic Cocktail, March 30, 2015

=== Art Zone ===
Originally titled Art Zone in Studio, Art Zone with Nancy Guppy premiered on the Seattle Channel in 2008. It has won nine Northwest Emmy awards and hosted many notable artists native to Washington State, including Parisalexa, Duff McKagan, Mike McCready, and Benicio Bryant. Host Nancy Guppy became well known in the Seattle area for her work as a cast member of KING-TV's comedy show Almost Live!, where she worked for 15 years.

Art Zone is known for its performances and interviews at the Seattle Georgetown Stables. This weekly program focuses on the Seattle art scene, diving deep into local talent and telling artists stories through interviews and media visuals.

=== CityStream ===
CityStream is a weekly feature magazine program that focuses on organizations, people and places in Seattle. It is often hosted by local contracted broadcast journalists/television hosts such as Enrique Cerna, Jeff Renner, and Lori Matzukawa. CityStream is a longstanding show on the Seattle Channel. In 2019, the show won an Emmy Award in the sports category for an episode on the Special Olympics USA Games.

=== Civic Cocktail ===
Civic Cocktail is a co-produced show between the Seattle Channel and Seattle City Club. The show invites local public figures, often in government, who contribute to a discussion led by a host with a live studio audience, mainly community members from the Seattle area. Attendees must pay a fee to partake in the Civic Cocktail event, which are distributed as season passes or individually. The location of the filming varies. Notable episodes include "Seattle: Dying or Trying...and Changing" and "Civic Cocktail: City Council Election Analysis + How Voters Shape Seattle". There is a question and answer segment on every show, allowing Seattle residents to ask leaders and panel speakers any questions they might have concerning the topic of discussion. Civic Cocktail is taped each month from February to June, and from October to November.

=== City Inside Out ===
City Inside Out is hosted by Brian Callanan, who was a reporter and news anchor at Q13 FOX from 2000 to 2011. The show has weekly guests, highlighting local issues and engaging in educational discussion. It is a 30-minute weekly program, composed of field reporting/interviews and studio segments. Guests on the show include Joshua Baba, Tara Moss, and Ashley Archibald.

City Inside Out has a Council Edition, where local lawmakers and politicians come on and engage in conversation with host Brian Callanan.

== Awards & Nominations ==
Emmy Awards & Nominations - Northwest Chapter
Year	Category	Nominated Title	Award Status
2017	Environmental - Feature/Segment	Nube 9	Awarded
2017	Arts/Entertainment - Feature/Segment	Humaira Abid	Nominated
2017	Arts/Entertainment - Program/Special	Art Zone: For the Love of Vinyl	Awarded
2017	Health/Science - Feature/Segment	KO's Parkinson's	Nominated
2017	Health/Science - Program/Special	CityStream: Mobile Dentistry & Music Therapy	Nominated
2017	Information/Instructional - Feature/Segment	From Syria to Seattle	Nominated
2017	Public/Current/Community Affairs - Feature/Segment	Rapid Entry Rescue Swimmers	Nominated
2017	Public/Current/Community Affairs - Program/Special	City Inside/Out: Safe Injections Sites?	Awarded
2017	Politics/Government - Program/Special	Citizen University TV: Perform Power	Nominated
2017	Interview/Discussion - Program/Special	Art Zone Special with Mike McCready	Awarded
2017	Reporter - Programming	Josephine Cheng	Nominated
2017	Editor - Program	Ian Devier	Nominated
2018	Business/Consumer – Story/Series (No Time Limit)	Refugee Artisan Initiative	Nominated
2018	Politics/Government – Program/Special	Citizen University: 2018 Year in Review	Nominated
2018	Environment – Program/Special	CityStream: Saving the Tree Kangaroo	Nominated
2018	Sports – Program One-Time Special	CityStream: Special Olympics in Seattle	Awarded
2018	Arts/Entertainment – Program Feature/Segment	Custom Guitar Amp Designer & Craftsman Mike Soldano	Awarded
2018	Arts/Entertainment – Program Feature/Segment	Robert E. Jackson: Snapshot Collector	Nominated
2018	Arts/Entertainment – Program/Special	Art Zone with Nancy Guppy Celebrates Record Store Day 2018	Nominated
2018	Historic/Cultural – Program Feature/Segment	Portraits of Courage	Awarded
2018	Informational/Instructional – Program Feature/Segment	Alicia's Story	Nominated
2018	Human Interest – Program Feature/Segment	Conscious Eatery	Nominated
2018	Interview/Discussion – Program/Special	Art Zone with Nancy Guppy: A Conversation with the Filmmakers of 'Big Sonia'	Awarded
2018	Documentary – Cultural	The 24	Nominated
2018	Promotion – Program Campaign	Art Zone Promotional Campaign	Awarded
2018	Program Host/Moderator	Linda Byron	Nominated
2018	Program Host/Moderator	Brian Callanan	Nominated
2018	Photographer - Video Essay	Randy Eng: Viewing the Blue Angels	Nominated
2018	Editor – Program	Christopher Barnes: Custom Guitar Amp Designer & Craftsman Mike Soldano	Nominated
2019	Health/Science – Program/Special	A Healing Act: Improv for People with Memory Loss	Nominated
2019	Politics/Government – Program/Special	City Inside/Out: Prolific Offenders	Nominated
2019	Arts/Entertainment – Program Feature/Segment	Dancing in the Air Made Easy (It's Not)	Nominated
2019	Arts/Entertainment – Program/Special	Celebrating a Decade of Art Zone	Awarded
2019	Historic/Cultural – Program Feature/Segment	CityStream: Eat with Muslims	Awarded
2019	Informational/Instructional – Program/Special	CityStream: UFOs, Strange Things & Terror Time	Nominated
2019	Public/Current/Community Affairs – Program/Special	CityStream: Farewell to the Viaduct	Nominated
2019	Human Interest – Program Feature/Segment	Glen "Pops" Freeman	Nominated
2019	Human Interest – Program Feature/Segment	Lance Mercer's New Focus	Awarded
2019	Interview/Discussion – Program/Special	Art Zone with Nancy Guppy: John Waters, Thomas Dausgaard and Good Co	Nominated
2019	Special Event Coverage	SIFF Opening Night 2019	Awarded
2019	Program Host/Moderator	Brian Callanan	Nominated
2019	Program Host/Moderator	Enrique Cerna	Nominated
2019	Editor – Program	Christopher Barnes	Nominated
2019	Editor – Program	Randy Eng	Nominated
2019	Audio	Christopher Barnes	Nominated
2020	Overall Excellence	Seattle Channel	Nominated
2020	Business/Consumer – Short and Long Form Content	Jerk Shack seeks to expand to better serve Black Community	Nominated
2020	Health/Medical – Long Form Content	CityStream: Healthcare Heroes & Outdoor Learning	Awarded
2020	Arts/Entertainment – Long Form Content	Music prodigy Benicio Bryant , Seattle's pyromaniac on Art Zone	Nominated
2020	Interactive Media	Seattle in 360: ONYX Fine Arts Collective	Nominated
2020	Interview/Discussion	City Inside/Out: Future of Seattle Police Department	Nominated
2020	Human Interest – Short Form Content	CityStream: Greg Roth Cycles with Purpose	Nominated
2020	Program Host/Moderator	Brian Callanan	Nominated
2020	Editor - Non-news (Short/Long Form Content)	Christopher Barnes	Nominated
2021	Overall Excellence	Seattle Channel	Nominated
2021	Business/Consumer – Short and Long Form Content	CityStream: Kenmore Air Anniversary & Native Soul Cuisine	Nominated
2021	Arts/Entertainment – Short Form Content	Fashion Designer Gustavo Apiti	Awarded
2021	Historical/Cultural – Short Form Content	CityStream: What Happened to the Bubbleator?	Nominated
2021	Historical/Cultural – Long Form Content	CityStream: Art Inspiration & Historic Preservation	Nominated
2021	Sports Story – Short and Long Form Content	Seattle Kraken: Supporting Equity	Nominated
2021	Public Affairs Program	CityStream: Searching for Connections & Straight Shooters	Nominated
2021	Interview/Discussion	City Inside/Out: Police Reform	Awarded
2021	Editor - Non-news (Short/Long Form Content)	Christopher Barnes	Nominated
2022	Business/Consumer – Short and Long Form Content	ARTE NOIR: Uplifting Black Art, Artists & Culture	Nominated
2022	Business/Consumer – Short and Long Form Content	CityStream: Viet-Wah Closes Its Doors	Awarded
2022	Health/Medical – Short Form Content	CityStream: Help is available through free & confidential 988 Suicide & Crisis Lifeline	Nominated
2022	Arts/Entertainment – Long Form Content	Art Zone: Marshall Law Band, Preston Singletary, typewriter repair & more	Nominated
2022	Arts/Entertainment – Short Form Content	Art Zone: The vibrant vision of mixed media artist Moses Sun	Awarded
2022	Historical/Cultural – Long Form Content	Community Stories: Spirit of the Waters	Nominated
2022	Diversity Equity Inclusion – Long Form Content	Community Stories: Running with the Paint: Rosalie Fish	Awarded
2022	Diversity Equity Inclusion – Long Form Content	Community Stories: And We Rise: Climbers of Color	Nominated
2022	Human Interest – Short Form Content	CityStream: In Search of the Missing Sand Point Aviators	Awarded
2022	Human Interest – Short Form Content	Art Zone: Brittany Davis glows as a vessel of sound, channeler of music	Nominated
2022	Informational/Instructional – Long Form Content	CityStream: Daybreak Star: Programs, Powwows & New Connections	Nominated
2022	Video Essayist	Pete Cassam	Awarded
2022	Editor - Short Form Content	Christopher Barnes	Nominated
2023	Business/Consumer – Short and Long Form Content	Seattle's Legendary Scarecrow Video	Nominated
2023	Health/Medical – Short and Long Form Content	CityStream: SMASH: Healthcare Assistance for Musicians	Nominated
2023	Environment/Science – Long Form Content	CityStream: Species Restoration, Battery Safety and Turning Down the Volume	Nominated
2023	Arts/Entertainment – Short Form Content	Stories in glass & grisaille: The rich artistic world of Cappy Thompson	Nominated
2023	Arts/Entertainment – Long Form Content	Art Zone: Community Builder Carolyn Hitt, Dawn Bassett's perfect plaster & more	Nominated
2023	Historical/Cultural – Short Form Content	Community Stories: We Hereby Refuse: The Akutsu Family Resists	Nominated
2023	Historical/Cultural – Short Form Content	CityStream: Life Through the Lens of Al Smith	Nominated
2023	Diversity/Equity/Inclusion – Short Form Content	48-Star Flag Signing Project	Nominated
2023	Diversity/Equity/Inclusion – Short Form Content	CityStream: New Mariners Training Centers Encourage Diversity	Nominated
2023	Diversity Equity Inclusion – Long Form Content	CityStream: Diversity in Dance and Retiring with Grace	Nominated
2023	Public Affairs Program	The Fight Against Fentanyl	Awarded
2023	Human Interest – Short Form Content	The Magical Master Guitar Maker Roy McAlister	Awarded
2023	Video Essayist	Pete Cassam	Awarded
2023	Video Essayist	Christopher Barnes	Nominated
2023	Editor - Short Form Content	Christopher Barnes	Nominated
2024	Overall Excellence	Seattle Channel	Awarded
2024	Health/Medical – Short Form or Long Form Content	CityStream: Seattle Children's Hospital Festival of Trees	Nominated
2024	Health/Medical – Short Form or Long Form Content	CityStream: Free Medical, Dental & Vision Care Clinic	Nominated
2024	Environment/Science – Long Form Content	CityStream: Tunnels, Bioswales and Rooftop Solar	Nominated
2024	Historical/Cultural – Short Form Content	CityStream: UW Women's Rowing History	Nominated
2024	Historical/Cultural – Long Form Content	Community Stories: Grindline Skateparks	Nominated
2024	Human Interest – Short Form Content	A Teacher's Impact - The Story of Ron and Ms. Allen	Nominated
2024	Human Interest – Short Form Content	"A Way of Connecting" - Representational Painter Michael Stasinos	Awarded
2024	Video Essayist	Peter Cassam	Nominated
2024	Video Essayist	Christopher Barnes	Nominated
2024	Writer – Short Form Content	Brian Callanan	Nominated
2025	Overall Excellence	Seattle Channel	Nominated
2025	Business/Consumer – Short Form or Long Form Content	CityStream: Pioneer Square Improvements, Musang & Eclipse Hat Shop	Nominated
2025	Health/Medical – Short Form or Long Form Content	Comics Draw Dignity & Humanity Behind Seattle/King County Clinic	Nominated
2025	Diversity/Equity/Inclusion – Short Form Content	"Es Una Pasión Para Mi" - Jaime Mendez find his voice again	Nominated
2025	Human Interest – Short Form Content	Art Zone: Larry Reid	Awarded
2025	Human Interest – Short Form Content	A Final Farewell on Puget Sound	Nominated
2025	Informational/Instructional - Long Form Content	CityStream: Our Deep Connections to the Waters of Puget Sound	Nominated
2025	Branded Content - Short Form Content	The Grind: Seattle Firefighter Academy	Nominated
2025	Writer – Short Form Content	Crowe Storyteling - Memorials, Memories & Mettle	Awarded
2025	Video Essayist	Natalie Krick Artist Profile - Christopher Barnes	Nominated
2025	Editor	Larry Reid Editing Artist Profile - Christopher Barnes	Awarded
