= Dori Monson =

American talk show host (1961–2022)

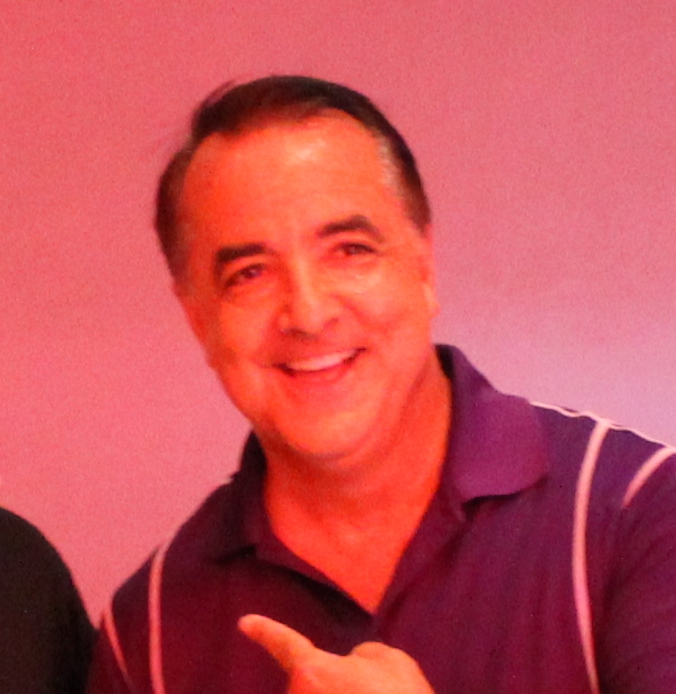
- Monson in 2013
- Born: Dori Monson; October 2, 1961; Seattle, Washington, U.S.
- Died: December 31, 2022 (aged 61); Seattle, Washington, U.S.
- Presenting career
- Show: Dori Monson Show; Hawk Talk
- Stations: KIRO-FM; Seahawks Radio Network
- Time slot: 12 pm – 3 pm PST
- Style: Conservative; Topical talk/comedy show; Sports talk show
- Country: United States
- Website: mynorthwest.com/category/the-dori-monson-show/

Dori Monson (October 2, 1961 – December 31, 2022) was an American radio personality who hosted the Dori Monson Show, an afternoon talk radio show in Seattle, Washington, on KIRO-FM.

== Early life and education ==
Monson, who was of Icelandic heritage, grew up in Ballard, a Scandinavian ethnic enclave in Seattle. He graduated from Ballard High School. As a student at the University of Washington, he was the play-by-play announcer for Husky football on-campus broadcaster KCMU.

== Career ==
=== Early career ===
After longtime Seattle broadcaster Bill O'Mara introduced him to King Broadcasting owner Dorothy Bullitt, Monson began his professional broadcasting career as a sports producer at KING-TV and sports reporter and host at KING AM, then moved to KIRO-FM 100.7 when the Pat Cashman Show switched stations in 1994.

=== The Dori Monson Show ===
==== Program history ====
In 1995, Monson was given his own show on KIRO in the noon to 3:00 pm time slot, replacing Dave Ross, who moved to the preceding 9:00 am to noon morning slot.

==== Program content ====
The dominant political orientation of his program began as roughly middle-of-the-road throughout the 1990s. He often sided with then President Bill Clinton against the conservative Republicans running Congress, particularly during the impeachment hearings following the Monica Lewinsky scandal. He said he voted for Al Gore in the year 2000 presidential election. However, his show turned decidedly conservative around the time of the September 11 attacks in 2001, enthusiastically supporting the Iraq invasion and accusing global warming activists of being "phony, global warming cultists". He also once asked Washington State Democratic Party Chairman Dwight Pelz if he was a communist. Monson was also a critic of major Seattle infrastructure projects such as Sound Transit and the State Route 99 tunnel.

Among the regular features on The Dori Monson Show was a weekly "one on one against the nuns" segment where Monson tested his football acumen against two nuns, Sisters Kath Silverthorn and Cele Gorman of the Archdiocese of Seattle, each making predictions for the next Sunday's NFL games. "I wanted to find the absolute most incongruous people we'd normally never associate with football analysis," Monson explained. "I thought that would be either Sherpas or nuns and it'd probably be easier to find nuns."

On October 8, 2020, Monson posted a tweet during the 2020 Washington state gubernatorial debate mocking governor Jay Inslee by attempting to contrast his science-based COVID-19 policies but support for Washingtonians’ ability to change their sex designation on birth certificates. As a result, he was suspended from his job at KIRO and also suspended indefinitely by the Seahawks and Bonneville Seattle from hosting the Seahawks' pregame and postgame radio shows. While his Seahawks suspension was permanent, he was reinstated to his KIRO-FM show on October 26, 2020.

==== Program ratings and recognition ====
The Dori Monson Show (also referred to as "The Big Show") was heard from noon to 3:00 pm PST on KIRO-FM and was primarily a politically oriented talk-radio program. As of winter 2008, his show was the highest-rated talk-radio program in the Seattle-Tacoma market. In 2008 Monson was nominated for Radio & Records News/Talk/Sports Local Personality Of The Year, ultimately losing to Bill Handel of KFI-AM (Los Angeles). In 2018, Monson was one of five finalists for the National Association of Broadcasters Marconi Award in the category Large Market Personality of the Year.

=== Hawk Talk ===
Beginning in 2002, Monson hosted Hawk Talk, a day-of-game broadcast carried on the Seahawks Radio Network, that airs games of the NFL's Seattle Seahawks. Monson also anchored the pre-game, post-game and halftime shows during Seahawks broadcasts, when he was joined by Sam Adkins, Paul Moyer, and Dave Wyman.

=== Coaching ===
From 2010 to 2017, Monson was the head coach of the Shorecrest High School girls basketball team in Shoreline, Washington, prior to which he served two years as assistant coach. The period was recognized as the most successful in the program's history, with the team compiling a 125–72 record. In 2016, his team won the Washington state girls basketball championship and Monson was recognized as the state Coach of the Year.

== Personal life and death ==
Monson was married with three daughters and lived in Lake Forest Park, Washington. He variously described himself as "right-leaning", "center right", and "libertarian". Monson stated publicly that he voted for Bob Barr in the 2008 presidential election.

Monson died in a Seattle hospital on December 31, 2022, at the age of 61; he had suffered a cardiac arrest two days before.
