= Up Late NW =

- Genre: Sketch comedy, variety show
- Starring: Chris Cashman; Pat Cashman
- Country of origin: United States
- Original language: English
- No. of seasons: 1
- No. of episodes: 18

Production
- Executive producers: B Anthony Nelson; Pat Cashman; Chris Cashman
- Production locations: Seattle, Washington
- Running time: 22 minutes

Original release
- Network: KING-TV; KONG-TV (Repeats); KOIN-TV; KREM; KSKN-TV (Repeats); KEVU-CD; KLSR-TV; KDRV
- Release: September 19, 2015 – May 2016

Related
- Almost Live! The (206); The John Report with Bob

Up Late NW is a sketch comedy and variety television series which premiered on September 19, 2015. The show is broadcast on Saturday nights across the Pacific Northwest; in Seattle on KING-TV at 1:05 AM (Pacific) following Saturday Night Live, and at 11:30 PM in Portland, Oregon on KOIN-TV; in Spokane, Washington on KREM; in Eugene, Oregon on KEVU-CD; and in Medford, Oregon on KDRV.

Up Late NW is hosted by Emmy Award winning Northwest television personalities Pat Cashman and Chris Cashman, who are a father (Pat) and son (Chris) team.

The first several episodes of the series were shot before a live studio audience at Fremont Studios in Seattle, Washington, and included live audience interactions. Later episodes have been recorded in various locations lacking a live audience. Each episode features pre-recorded digital sketch comedy shorts, special celebrity guests, and performances by both Northwest stand-up comedians and musical guests. Guests have included: Jeff Probst, Joel McHale, Kenny Mayne, Danny Bonaduce, Roger Fisher, Shawn Kemp, Luke Willson, Taylor John Williams, and many more.

Up Late NW is a production from Artists think Tank, LLC. Pat and Chris Cashman are co-executive producers with showrunner B Anthony Nelson, and partners with Head of Production Christopher Sherlock and Executive VP Distribution/Co-Producer Ryan Craig. It is often considered a successor to the Seattle-based productions of Almost Live! and The (206), mostly because of the involvement of Pat and Chris Cashman.

== See also ==
- Almost Live!
