= Bill Nye: The Science Guy - Stop the Rock! =

1996 video game

- Developer(s): ImageBuilder Software
- Publisher(s): Pacific Interactive Seattle
- Platform(s): Windows, Macintosh
- Release: NA: 1996
- Genre(s): Educational
- Mode(s): Single-player

Bill Nye: The Science Guy – Stop the Rock! is an educational video game based on the Bill Nye the Science Guy television series developed by ImageBuilder Software and published by Pacific Interactive Seattle for Windows and Macintosh in 1996.

== Plot ==
In the game, a large meteoroid called "Impending Dumé" threatens to make a catastrophic collision with the Earth. A team of scientists develop a laser satellite-controlling computer system called MAAX (Meteoroid and Asteroid Exploder) to destroy the meteoroid; however, MAAX develops a personality of its own and refuses to save the planet unless Earth's scientists can solve seven science riddles. Nye Labs decides to take on MAAX's challenge, and the player, depicted as the newest member of the Nye Labs team, is asked to solve these riddles using Nye Labs' equipment before Impending Dumé hits (represented through an in-game timer). The game featured a fully explorable Nye Labs, as well as video cut scenes featuring Nye and other Nye Labs scientists. However, the characters and cast members from the TV series, sans Nye and a few others, do not appear in this game, instead being replaced by game-exclusive Nye Labs team members and new actors.

== Development ==
The game was announced by Pacific Interactive at E3 1996.
