= Amazing Planet =

- Created by: National Geographic Kids Video
- Starring: Pat Cashman, Tiffany Saito, Mark Pinckney, Ki Gottberg
- No. of episodes: 6

Original release
- Release: 1996 – 1997

Amazing Planet is an educational children's show produced by National Geographic Kids Video, which ran from late 1996 to early 1997 on VHS.

== Premise ==
On the planet Miptor, three alien janitors Rip Rayon (Pat Cashman), Squeege (Mark Pinckney) and Kidogo (Tiffany Saito) were cleaning a spaceship until their boss Admiral Lump checks in on them via the ship's view screen. His presence frightens Squeege so much that Squeege accidentally starts the engine launching the ship into outer space. The janitors then assume roles: Rip Rayon as Captain, Squeege as Pilot and Kidogo as Engineer. Joining them as information officer on their exploration of Earth, is Orb (Ki Gottberg), a hovering metal orb that provides information to the aliens.

== Format ==
Each episode begins with the aliens and Orb traveling to a specific location on Earth. Rip Rayon orders Squeege to land the spaceship gently on the ground but Squeege's landings are often rough. When they arrive, the aliens at first glance are frightened by an object in that location. Then they ask Orb what that object is. Whenever the aliens mentioned their boss Admiral Lump, Admiral Lump appears via the ship's view screen and orders the aliens to get to the bottom of the situation and report their findings back to him when they are done. At the end of the episode, the aliens present their report to Admiral Lump either in spoken detail or music video obviously leaving Admiral Lump in a bad mood. He then tells them to find something that would please him or they're never going back to their home planet. The aliens would start to say something bad about Admiral Lump but when Admiral Lump demands to know what they said, the aliens correct their sentence. Then the aliens would do a fun activity.

== Reception ==
The Chicago Tribune reviewed Amazing Planet as a "delightful," "charming, goofy", "informative, yet engaging, children's show," in which "low-budget effects add another wacky touch."

== Home media ==
=== Shark-a-Thon ===
Release Date: April 7, 1998

In this episode, Rip, Kidogo, Squeege and Orb take a look at sharks, one of the ocean's deadliest predators.

=== Lava Blast ===
Release Date: April 7, 1998

In this episode, the aliens and Orb examine volcanoes.

=== Mummies Unwrapped ===
Release Date: July 14, 1998

After crashing down the side of a pyramid in Egypt, Orb tells the aliens about mummies. When Rip decides to bring some treasure aboard the ship, a "curse" is placed upon the cabin. At the episode's end, the aliens beamed the treasure back to its rightful owner. Then they present to Admiral Lump their report about mummies. Then Kidogo reports something strangely familiar. Rip tells Kidogo to beam it up but the object turns out to be the mummy seen earlier in the episode frightening all three aliens.

=== Mystery Quest ===
Release Date: July 14, 1998

In this episode, the aliens and Orb take a look at the mysteries of Earth, including the sudden disappearance of the Mayan civilization. The aliens think that the mysteries were caused by their arch rivals the Argoonians but the mysteries weren't caused by the Argoonians. At the end of the episode, Kidogo informs Rip that they're about to enter another one of earth's mysteries: The Bermuda Triangle. Orb tells Rip and Squeege that many planes and ships disappeared without a trace upon entering the triangle. Rip thinks that what Orb was telling them is nonsense and tells Squeege to fly the ship into the triangle. Suddenly the ship (with Rip, Squeege, Kidogo and Orb inside) disappeared. The episode ends with a sign saying To Be Continued.... on the screen.

=== Creatures of the Deep ===
Release Date: December 8, 2010

In this episode of Amazing Planet, Rip, Squeege, Kidogo and Orb take a dive into the ocean and examine the creatures of the deep.

=== Explosive Earth ===
Release Date: December 8, 2010

This DVD of Amazing Planet features the aliens and Orb looking at earthquakes and volcanoes.
