= Pat Cashman Show =

Seattle based 90's Radio Program

The Pat Cashman Show was a radio program that aired in Seattle, Washington during the 1990s. Hosted by radio and television personality Pat Cashman, this show provided morning commuters with commentary, sketches, parodies of local commercials, and more. The show also featured Seattle radio personality Dori Monson, who would later host his own radio program on KIRO-FM. After the show was cancelled, Pat Cashman's fans made an attempt to bring his show back on another station, which succeeded for a few years, until it was cancelled again.

On May 24, 2006, Pat Cashman made his radio return on KRKO 1380AM in Everett, WA. This program is advertised as being a mix of real and fake news, commercials, and interviews. It aired every Wednesday from 1-3 PM. Pat signed off on his KRKO show in May 2007.
