= Ed Wyatt =

American Australian sports journalist

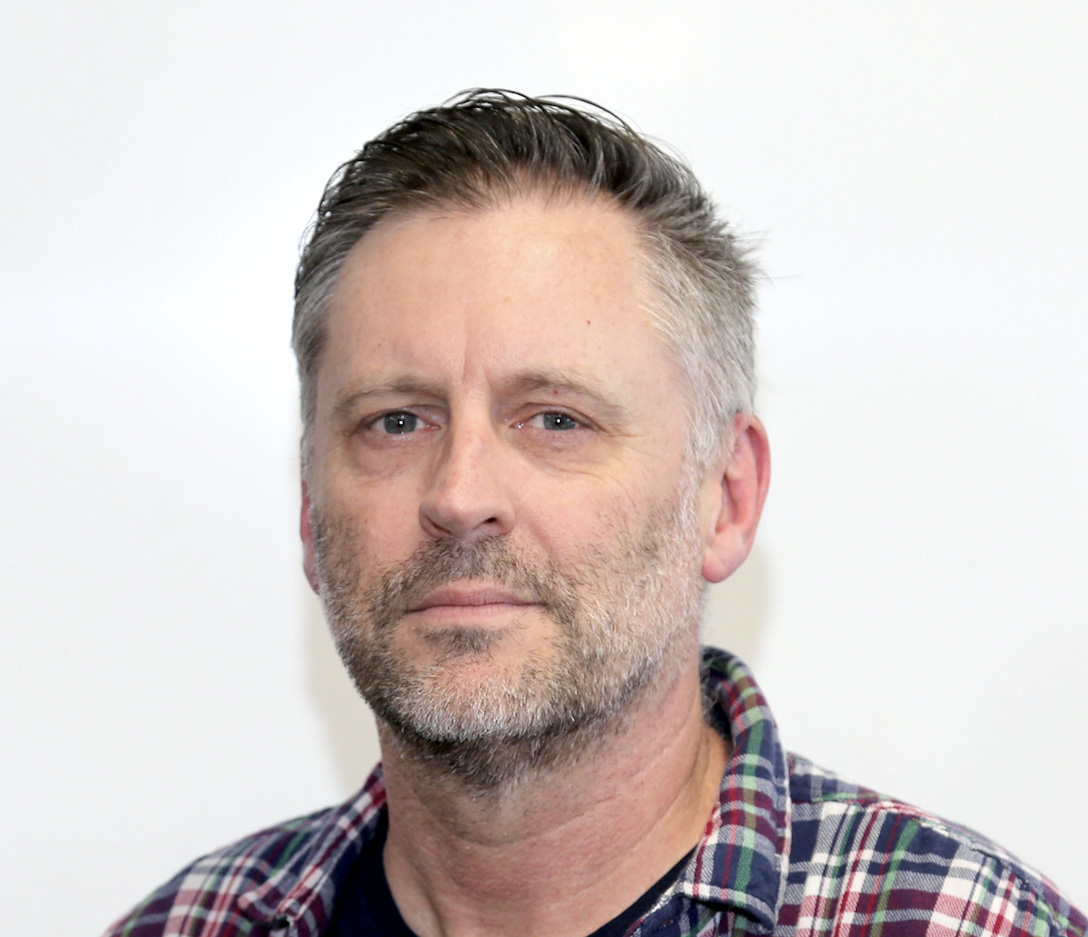
- Ed Wyatt, former Almost Live! comedy writer/performer.
- Born: Edward Wyatt
- Education: Stanford University
- Occupations: Journalist, Television presenter
- Known for: Almost Live!

Edward "Ed" Wyatt is an American Australian sports journalist and television presenter.

He worked as one of two SBS Television Melbourne-based reporters from 2000 to 2006 and hosted SBS's live coverage of the Super Bowl and the US baseball World Series in 2002 and the World Ice Hockey Championships in 2004. He was at 1116 SEN radio since its inception.

== Early life/career ==
Wyatt grew up in Portland, Oregon, United States. He has a Bachelor of Arts degree in English from Stanford University. He taught English at Bellarmine Prep in Tacoma while also coaching football and basketball.

== Media career ==
Wyatt's career in television started in Seattle, as both a writer and performer of sketch comedy on the program Almost Live!, for which he won five Emmy awards.

He joined Fox Sports World, an international sports network, in 1997 and worked as the face of Australian rules football and hosted English/Scottish/German Premier League matches. He was also the writer responsible for the weekly English Premier League show that was seen nationally across the USA.

In 2000, Wyatt started his work at SBS-TV. He reported weekly on US sports for SBS and hosted the Super Bowl live on that network from 2003 to 2008. When Australia's free-to-air screening rights for the Super Bowl switched to the Ten Network in February 2009, Wyatt joined the move and was seen in studio with Andrew Maher and former AFL star and current NFL punter Saverio Rocca.

In 2004, he joined Melbourne's SEN 1116 where he co-hosted Born In The USA (radio show) with Steve Salisbury. In 2006, Wyatt did the voiceover for the Nine Network’s Celebrity Golf Shoot-Out.

In April 2008 he was appointed Communications Manager of the South Dragons, a member of Australia's National Basketball League.

Most recently Wyatt worked as the play-by-play caller for SEN Digital's A-League soccer games and currently calls games for the ABL's Melbourne Aces baseball club. He works as an online content creator and also hosts The DRS Zone Formula 1 podcast with his son Sam.

== External ==
- Broadcast website
