= Nancy Guppy =

American comedian and television personality

Nancy Guppy is an American comedian and television personality from Seattle, Washington, U.S. She is perhaps best known from her time as a writer and cast member of KING-TV's Seattle-centric sketch comedy program Almost Live!, which ran for 15 years (1984-1999).

Guppy grew up in Seattle's Magnolia neighborhood, graduated from Queen Anne High School and in 1982 from the University of Washington (as a speech and communications major). After three years in the Customer Service Credit Department of Nordstrom, she became a secretary in the Cornish College of the Arts drama department. She began playing small parts on Almost Live!, where her then-boyfriend (and later husband) Joe Guppy was a regular cast member, and soon evolved into a writer for the show. In 1989 the couple moved to Los Angeles because her husband was hired by HBO for Not Necessarily the News which, however, was close to the end of its run. The two then wrote together on a free-lance basis, returning in 1992 to Seattle and Almost Live. In 1996 she wrote and produced a 32-skit, seven-character stage piece, Cheaper Than Therapy, which was presented that year at Seattle's Market Theater.

Since that time, Guppy has been creator/host/producer of a series of programs focusing on Pacific Northwest arts and culture, first City a Go Go on the Seattle Channel and KCTS-TV, and as of 2015, Art Zone with Nancy Guppy, a weekly television program on the Seattle Channel. In 2015 she produced an art exhibit Musician: a Portrait Project at Seattle's newly restored Union Stables, featuring portraits by Ernie Sapiro of 172 prominent figures from the Seattle music scene.
