= Planet Soul =

House music group from Miami, Florida, USA

- Also known as: Planet Soul
- Origin: Miami, Florida
- Genres: House, progressive house,Techno
- Labels: Strictly Rhythm
- Past members: George Acosta; Nadine Renee; Brenda Dee (vocals on "Feel the Music"); Veronica Barrios (songwriter)

Planet Soul was a house duo from Miami, Florida, composed of producer George Acosta and singer Nadine Renee.

== Biography ==
They released one album in 1996, entitled Energy and Harmony, and are primarily remembered as a one-hit wonder for their song "Set U Free", which peaked at number 26 on the Billboard Hot 100 in early 1996. Brenda Dee did lead vocals on their second biggest hit, Feel The Music and went on to tour for the group throughout the US and Europe. She was lead vocals on the completion of their debut album, Energy & Harmony which was co-written by Veronica Barrios and produced by the group’s creator, George Acosta.

== Nadine Renee's death ==
On December 2, 2004, Renee died of complications from the delivery of her first child, Liat Nadine Shamir.

== Discography ==
=== Albums ===
- Energy and Harmony (Strictly Rhythm, 1996) U.S. Billboard 200 #165

== Singles ==
Year	Title	Chart positions	
Year	Title	Billboard Hot 100	US Hot Dance Music/Maxi-Singles
1995	"Set U Free"	26	3
1996	"Feel the Music"	73	10
1996	"Look Into My Eyes"	—	47
1999	"Music Is My Life"	—	—
