= The (206) =

- Genre: Comedy, Variety show
- Starring: Chris Cashman; John Keister; Pat Cashman
- Country of origin: United States
- Original language: English
- No. of episodes: 44 (3 specials)

Production
- Executive producers: Erren Gottlieb; James McKenna
- Production locations: Seattle, Washington; Bellevue, Washington
- Running time: 22 minutes

Original release
- Network: KING-TV; KONG-TV (Repeats)
- Release: January 6, 2013 – 2015

Related
- Almost Live! The John Report with Bob; Up Late Northwest

The (206) (styled "The [206]" on-screen) was a local sketch comedy television show in Seattle, Washington, broadcast by NBC affiliate KING-TV, that premiered on January 6, 2013. The show is broadcast on Sunday at 1:00 AM (Pacific), following Saturday Night Live. It was the successor to Almost Live! and much of the comedy is related to Seattle events and culture.

After two initial episodes, the show left the schedule locally; however, it returned for a full season on April 27, 2013. The first season consists of 12 episodes, the last of which aired July 28, 2013. In addition, the "Not Especially Special, Special" was aired on July 7, 2013.

The second season began on November 16, 2013, and ended on May 3, 2014.

The third season began on October 18, 2014, but without John Keister; it was announced that he left the show to pursue other interests. He said he is now putting together a one-man show called The Keister Monologues. It ended in May 2015.

The show was replaced in September 2015 with Up Late Northwest (but branded on air as Up Late NW), which retained the basic sketch comedy/guest format and cast, but the show can now be seen in cities throughout the Pacific Northwest, not just Seattle.
