= Tracey Conway =

Tracey Conway (born August 27, 1956) is an actress, comedienne, writer and cardiac health advocate. She was a regular cast member on KING-TV's Almost Live!, a Seattle-based sketch comedy show, from 1984 to 1999.

== Early life ==
Conway earned a BFA (Theater Arts) from the University of New Mexico. A classically trained actress, she attained a MFA in Drama from the University of Southern California and moved to Seattle to pursue stage acting. Conway was diagnosed with arrhythmia in her 20s and was prescribed medication. She lost her only brother, Mark, to a heart attack at age 39.

== Almost Live! ==
Conway came to the attention of the Almost Live! creative team while temping in the human resources department of KING television as she pursued her theater acting career. She was first recruited by the show for an April Fool's Day sketch depicting the fictitious collapse of Seattle's Space Needle, where her "eyewitness" performance resulted in the station being inundated with calls and the 9-1-1 callboard being disabled.

Conway was one of the main female performers on Almost Live!, and her recurring characters included the eponymous character in "The Worst Girlfriend in the World" sketches. In 1992, just prior to the show starting its two-year run on the Comedy Central network, Conway won the Northwest Emmy Award for Best Talent. She won two Emmy award nominations for her writing on the show.

=== Heart attack ===
On January 21, 1995, at the close of a live taping of Almost Live!, Conway's heart went into potentially fatal arrhythmia ventricular fibrillation and she collapsed from sudden cardiac arrest on the set of the show. At first, the audience thought the collapse was a joke, as the cast had just done a sketch spoofing the television show ER. According to Conway, "A hundred people laughed at me. They assumed this was an actor's pratfall", but her fellow cast members knew this was unscripted. A volunteer firefighter in the audience performed CPR on Conway until first responders arrived. After about 18 minutes, following the sixth defibrillator shock, Conway's heart begin beating on its own again.

Conway was transported by Medic One to Harborview Medical Center, the sole level one emergency hospital in the northwest, and was treated in the emergency cardiac care unit for four days. Following multiple tests that determined her cardiac arrest was idiopathic, she was transferred to Harborview's sister hospital, the University of Washington Medical Center, where an implantable cardioverter-defibrillator (ICD) was implanted in her chest.

Two weeks after Conway's collapse on the set of Almost Live!, she was back on set for a live taping. She continued to be a full-time cast member and writer for the remainder of the show's 15-year run. Conway has said she suspects that cigarettes she smoked during a sketch may have played a factor in her heart attack.

== Advocacy ==
Conway is now a regular speaker on the dangers of heart disease. Her presentations have included Drop Dead Gorgeous! and Dead: Been There! Done That! She is a regular keynote speaker at "Go Red for Women!" events across the country for the American Heart Association. At her speaking engagements, she encourages attendees to know their blood pressure, weight, cholesterol, blood sugar and other heart-related factors and has them demonstrate CPR to the sounds of the Bee Gees' "Stayin' Alive".

Conway has served as emcee and auction host for fundraising events, is involved with several organizations promoting automated external defibrillators (AEDs) and ICDs, serves on the board of Seattle's Hope Heart Institute and is a professional member of the National Speakers Association. In addition to her speaking engagements, she has contributed to Chicken Soup for the Soul and has appeared on PBS' Second Opinion.
