= Pat Cashman =

American actor

- Born: Patrick Cashman; September 16, 1950 (age 75); Bend, Oregon, U.S.
- Education: University of Portland (BA)
- Occupations: Radio personality, comedian
- Children: Chris Cashman, Katie Cashman
- Relatives: Mike Cashman (brother)

Patrick Cashman (born September 16, 1950) is an American comedian and television and radio personality based in the Seattle metropolitan area.

== Early life and education ==
Born and raised in Bend, Oregon. He has a younger brother named Mike Cashman who was drafted by the Los Angeles Lakers, who formerly worked as a substitute teacher in the Mukilteo School District and coached the 8th grade Explorer Middle School basketball team. Cashman graduated from Bend High School in 1968 and majored in journalism and communications at the University of Portland.

== Career ==
After graduation, he worked in radio in Bend, Ontario, and Eugene then switched to television, where he made local commercials at KEZI. Cashman moved to KING-TV in Seattle in 1980, where he again worked in making local commercials, including spots for the Seattle Mariners baseball team. He was a regular cast member of the long-running local comedy show Almost Live! with his co-star John Keister, as well as the announcer for Bill Nye the Science Guy. On radio, he has hosted the Pat Cashman Show, a morning drive-time show on several Seattle stations, and his familiar bassy voice is heard in local commercials. Among the local commercials he voices are the commercials for Jerry's Hardware in Eugene and Springfield, Oregon—and Grover's Electric and Plumbing with multiple Northwest locations. He is also featured in Super Smash Bros. Brawl for the Nintendo Wii as the game's announcer, Master Hand, and Crazy Hand.

Cashman writes for several local newspapers in the Seattle region. He generally presents his comical view on a wide variety of subjects in a single article. Cashman has been in many advertisements for Taco Time. He appeared in Visioneers (2009) as a telethon host.

In January 2013, Cashman returned to Seattle TV with a new regional comedy show called The 206, along with his son Chris and former Almost Live! costar John Keister. Keister subsequently left the show in 2014. In 2015, a revamped version of the show, Up Late Northwest, began airing in other markets as well as Seattle (Portland, Spokane, Eugene and Medford). The program is hosted by both Pat and Chris Cashman.

== Filmography ==
=== Film ===
Year	Title	Role	Notes
2008	Visioneers	Bern Goodman	
2016	Tall Men	Bankruptcy Attorney	

=== Television ===
Year	Title	Role	Notes
1978	Peculiar Playhouse	Professor Jasper Farndark	1 episode
1991–1996	Almost Live!	Various	
1993–1998	Bill Nye the Science Guy	Various	98 episodes
1996	Pandora's Clock	Dave Telander	2 episodes
1996	Amazing Planet	Captain Rip Rayon	6 episodes
2008–2012	Biz Kid$	Narrator	45 episodes
2013	Still	Dan	Episode: "Peers"
2013–2015	The (206)	Various	41 episodes
2015	Up Late NW	Host	18 episodes
2017	Z Nation	Jack Kingman	Episode: "We Interrupt This Program"

=== Video games ===
Year	Title	Role	Notes
1998	M.U.G.E.N	Voice	
2002	Hoyle Casino Empire	Voice	
2008	Super Smash Bros. Brawl	Narrator / Master Hand / Crazy Hand	
