= Set U Free (Planet Soul song) =

Single by Planet Soul

from the album Energy & Harmony
- Released: October 11, 1995
- Recorded: 1995
- Genre: Techno; electronic; dance
- Length: 4:18
- Label: Strictly Rhythm
- Songwriter(s): Nadine "Harmony" Renee; George "Energy" Acosta
- Producer(s): George "Energy" Acosta

"Set U Free" is a 1995 hit single by techno music duo Planet Soul, co-written by Nadine Renee and George Acosta. The single was produced by Acosta and reached its peak of 26 on the Billboard Hot 100 on January 27, 1996.

The song is in the key of F♯/G♭with a BPM of 128.

== Charts ==
=== Weekly charts ===
1995	Position
US Billboard Hot 100	26
US Billboard Hot 100 Airplay	25
US Billboard Hot 100 Singles Sales	36
US Hot R&B/Hip-Hop Singles & Tracks	57
US Top 40 Mainstream	35
US Rhythmic Top 40	10
US Hot Dance Music/Maxi-Singles Sales	3

=== Year-end charts ===
1996	Position
US Billboard Hot 100	85
