= Ross Shafer =

American comedian (born 1954)

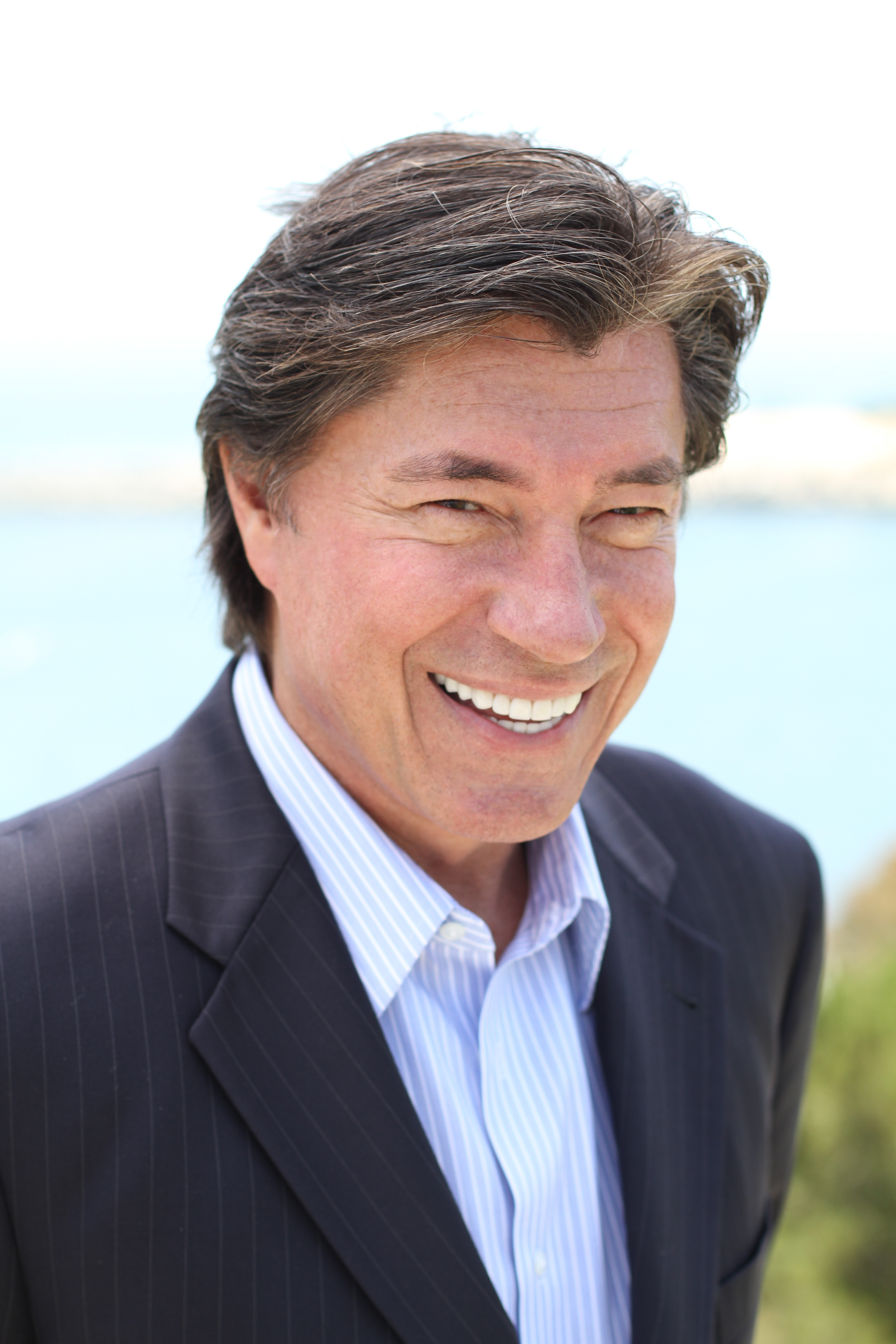
- Shafer in 2010
- Born: Ross Alan Shafer; December 10, 1954 (age 71); McMinnville, Oregon, U.S.
- Occupations: Television host, comedian, business speaker/consultant, author
- Years active: 1983–present

Ross Alan Shafer (born December 10, 1954) is an American comedian, network television host, motivational and leadership speaker and consultant. He has authored nine business books, and earned six Emmy Awards as a network talk and game show host.

== Biography ==
Born in McMinnville, Oregon, Shafer graduated from Federal Way High School in Federal Way, Washington. As a high school All-Conference football player, he received a scholarship to play linebacker for the University of Puget Sound in Tacoma, Washington, where he earned a business marketing degree.

Shafer said, "I had trouble finding anything that I was passionate about, or that made me happy." He then opened a "combination pet and stereo store". His first acting came in the form of a community play; afterward, he tried out for a stand-up comedy competition.

From 1984 to 1989, Shafer hosted the local Seattle-based talk and comedy show, Almost Live!, and also hosted Fox's late night talk show, The Late Show, for the show's final six months in 1988.

In 1985, Shafer spearheaded an effort to replace Washington, My Home by Helen Davis with Louie Louie as Washington's official state song.

In the 1986–1987 season, Shafer hosted the Canadian game show Love Me Love Me Not. It also aired in the United States on the USA Network and ended after one season of 130 episodes.

From 1990 to 1991, Shafer hosted a short-lived revival of Match Game on ABC.

Shafer works as a keynote speaker and leadership coach in the areas of market share growth, customer friction, and workforce motivator.

== Bibliography ==
- Cook-Like-A-Stud (1991) ISBN 978-1880098172
- Nobody Moved Your Cheese! (2003) ISBN 978-1553956587
- The Customer Shouts Back! (2006) ASIN B004TY0W0Q
- Are You Relevant? (2009) ISBN 978-0-615-26523-0
- Grab More Market Share (2011) ISBN 978-1-118-13004-9
- Shy to Confident (2013) ISBN 978-0-615-86614-7
- Absolutely Necessary (2015) ISBN 978-0-692-27999-1
- Behave Like a Startup (2016) ISBN 978-0-9975336-1-3
- Success: It's on You (2016) ISBN 978-0-9975336-0-6
- No More Customer Friction (2017) ISBN 978-0692-86063-2
- Rattled (2021) ISBN 978-0-578-97246-6

== See also ==
- The Late Show (1986 talk show) § Ross Shafer
