= Bob Nelson (screenwriter) =

American film director and screenwriter (born 1956)

- Born: July 18, 1956 (age 70); Yankton, South Dakota, United States
- Occupations: Film director, screenwriter

Robert W. Nelson (born July 18, 1956) is an American film director and screenwriter, best known for writing Nebraska (2013) directed by Alexander Payne and released in 2013, for which Nelson was nominated for an Academy Award for Best Original Screenplay at the 86th Academy Awards. The screenplay was also nominated for a Golden Globe.

== Career ==
Nelson was a cast member and writer on the Seattle sketch comedy TV show Almost Live! in the 1990s.

Nelson won the 2014 Independent Spirit Award for Best First Screenplay for Nebraska.

In 2014, the Seattle-based alternative popular newspaper The Stranger nominated him for a Stranger Genius Award.

He wrote and directed The Confirmation starring Clive Owen, Maria Bello, and Patton Oswalt. It opened in March 2016.

== Personal life ==
He was raised in Kent, Washington, and currently lives with his wife on Whidbey Island in Washington.
