= Northwest Afternoon =

- Genre: live Talk/Lifestyle/variety
- Presented by: Dick Foley (1984-1996); Dana Middleton (1984-1992); Cindi Rinehart (1984-2008); Elisa Jaffe (1992-2007); Kent Phillips (1996-2008); Natasha Curry (2007-2008); Rachelle Murcia (2007-2008)
- Country of origin: United States
- Original language: English
- No. of seasons: 24

Production
- Production locations: Seattle, Washington, United States
- Camera setup: Multiple-camera-setup
- Running time: 60 minutes
- Production company: Fisher Communications

Original release
- Network: KOMO-TV
- Release: September 24, 1984 – September 5, 2008

Northwest Afternoon (also known at times as NWA) was a local television talk show in the United States. It aired weekdays at 3:00 (military 15:00) in the Puget Sound area of Washington. It was produced locally by Seattle TV station KOMO-TV Channel 4, and debuted in September 1984. The series ended its run on September 5, 2008 after a run of nearly 24 years.

== Format ==
The show's format, unchanged over its entire run, began with a 15-minute daily recap of soap opera serials aired that day, with the last 45 minutes being a talk/variety-type show. In the latter portion of the show, subjects could vary from show to show. In one show, a famous TV, movie, or newsmaking celebrity may make an appearance as a special guest (usually discussing their latest work, etc.), while the very next day could focus on a guest who has survived against all odds.

The show originated from Studio C of KOMO-TV's old building until it was demolished to make way for Fisher Plaza in 2000.

On June 10, 2008 KOMO-TV announced that Northwest Afternoon was cancelled because of increased competition against first-run syndicated fare from Dr. Phil on KING-TV, Rachael Ray on KIRO-TV, and Maury on KCPQ. These shows had made inroads into Northwest Afternoon's once-comfortable ratings, making it difficult for station management to continue producing the show. The stunning announcement came after the series won a local Emmy. A 24-year retrospective send-off was aired on September 4, 2008, with the last show airing on September 5. The show was replaced by The Doctors, a syndicated show that premiered on September 8, 2008.

== Hosts ==
The original hosts of the show were Dick Foley and Dana Middleton, with the soap-opera recap portion of the show hosted by Cindi Rinehart. Dana Middleton left in 1992 to pursue other interests. Middleton's replacement was Elisa Jaffe, a reporter and morning news anchor for KOMO News who had also launched "Morning Express", the station's first hour-long morning newscast in 1987. Dick Foley departed in 1996, and was replaced by KPLZ radio host Kent Phillips (who had been filling in on occasion for Rinehart for a few years prior).

The main portion of the program was most recently hosted by Kent Phillips, with rebroadcasts of segments co-hosted by Natasha Curry (who joined Northwest Afternoon in 2007), and KOMO News reporter Rachelle Murcia.

== Scoop on the Soaps ==
Scoop on the Soaps was the opening segment, usually 15–20 minutes in length, in which Cindi Rinehart gave viewers a daily recap of the happenings in the soap opera world. Her awkward style became legendary, though her segment was frequented - either in person or with live telephone calls - by major soap stars and producers, and Reinhart herself has even starred in soaps such as General Hospital.

Reinhart also attracted many fans beyond the Northwest. Since the show was also seen across Canada on satellite, it was not uncommon for viewers to call as far away as Nova Scotia and Quebec just to ask Reinhart questions about what would happen on the soaps.
