= Almost Live! =

- Starring: Ross Shafer; John Keister; Pat Cashman; Tracey Conway; Nancy Guppy; Joel McHale; Bob Nelson; Bill Nye; Bill Stainton; Steve Wilson; Ed Wyatt
- Country of origin: United States
- No. of seasons: 15
- No. of episodes: 389

Production
- Running time: 60 minutes (1984–1989), 30 minutes (1989–1999)
- Production company: King Broadcasting Company

Original release
- Network: KING-TV
- Release: September 23, 1984 – May 22, 1999

Related
- The (206); The John Report with Bob; Up Late NW; Bill Nye the Science Guy

Almost Live! is an American sketch comedy television series produced and broadcast by NBC affiliate KING-TV from 1984 to 1999 in Seattle, Washington. A repackaged version of the show also aired on Comedy Central from 1992 to 1993, and episodes aired on WGRZ-TV and other Gannett-owned stations in the late 1990s. The show was broadcast in Seattle on Saturday nights at 11:30, pushing Saturday Night Live back to midnight, while other Gannett stations aired it after Saturday Night Live.

== History ==
=== Original format ===
Almost Live! began as a weekly half-hour talk and comedy sketch show created by then VP of Programming Bob Jones, and hosted by Ross Shafer and closely patterned after Late Night with David Letterman, airing at 6:00 p.m. on Sundays. From the beginning, it featured many spoofs and satires of local and national television, series such as Star Trek, and unique locales in and around the city such as Ballard, Green Lake, Lynnwood, and Kent. The show became so popular that it was expanded from a half hour to one hour and shown twice a week. After four years and nearly 40 local Emmy Awards and several national awards, Shafer left to host the Fox Network's The Late Show.

As a follow-up to the local music program Rev which had John Keister as a frequent contributor, Almost Live! featured some of the earliest local musicians in the format that would later be called grunge.

=== John Keister and a change in format ===
Keister became the permanent replacement after Shafer left the program. Keister hosted for one season (1988–89) in the one-hour, 6 p.m. Sunday slot (and in the talk show format), but, following the lead of a "Greatest Hits" special that aired at 11:30 p.m. Saturday, the show moved into that slot. From the show's start until he became host in 1989, Keister was a regular supporting performer. Many of the initial award-winning elements of Almost Live! were his efforts, so the program quickly changed formats to feature more of his abilities, as well as other cast members, in video sketches. The guest interviews and live band segments were dropped. The focus changed to sketch comedy and the show was shaved back to a half-hour format. Because of its popularity among the station's staff members, KING-TV asked NBC to broadcast Almost Live at 11:30 p.m. slot, delaying Saturday Night Live locally by a half hour. The station received permission from the network to broadcast their show at that timeslot for a six-month trial basis, but host John Keister stated “Saturday Night Live tanked [in the ratings locally], and we won a big award [being named best local show in America by the National Association of Television Programming Executives], so the trial was allowed to continue [indefinitely].”

The format of the show during Keister's tenure as host always included an opening monologue. Much of the material had a local flavor to it. In addition to Seattle politicians and celebrities, regular targets of the show's barbs were various local stereotypes. The show featured running jokes about many Seattle neighborhoods, such as Ballard (home of elderly Scandinavian Americans who parked their cars halfway onto sidewalks with the seat belts slammed in the doors), Fremont and Wallingford (home of middle-aged hippies and New Agers), and suburbs such as Renton, Kent (perceived by the show's young, urban viewers as a low-income, white trash town) as well as Bellevue and Mercer Island (both of which have an upscale, snobby image). Other targets outside of Seattle proper included Olympia and Bellingham, both of which have hippie/pothead stereotypes. Most, but not all, of the local references were removed for the short-lived nationally aired Comedy Central version. The show also had promos for fake TV shows billed as "new shows on NBC for the upcoming season."

Besides Keister, regular cast members included Mike Neun, Pat Cashman, Tracey Conway, Nancy Guppy, Joe Guppy, Barb Klansnic, Joel McHale, Bob Nelson, Bill Nye, Bill Stainton, Andrea Stein, Lauren Weedman, Steve Wilson, Ed Wyatt, and Darrell Suto as Billy Quan. Writers included Scott Schaefer, who later went on to win three National Emmy Awards for writing on Bill Nye the Science Guy, and original Head Writer Jim Sharp, who is now Senior Vice President of Original Programming and Development for Comedy Central in Los Angeles. Later seasons occasionally featured Seattle-area comedian and voice actor David Scully who joined the core cast during the final season.

=== Cancellation ===
Almost Live! was canceled by KING-TV in 1999 because it was not making enough profit for Dallas-based Belo Corporation, which acquired the station's owner King Broadcasting Company two years earlier. KING-TV (now owned by Tegna) aired reruns of the show from its cancellation in 1999 until the fall of 2019; repeats of the show reappeared on KING-TV's streaming channel, KING 5+ in the fall of 2022; the episodes are also on KING-TV's YouTube channel. In fall 2000, Keister created a new sketch comedy show for competing station KIRO-TV, titled The John Report with Bob, essentially a carry-over of the news report segment he had done on Almost Live! with Bob Nelson in tow. The new show was canceled after two seasons, again because it was not making a profit.

KING aired a reunion show on September 12, 2005, featuring the cast of the final ten years. KING-TV also aired "Almost Live! Back At Ya", a series of "best of" shows, on Sundays starting September 10, 2006 at 9 p.m. until that December.

=== Sequel ===
In July 2012, clips surfaced on YouTube that appeared to promote a sketch comedy series called The (206), referring to Seattle's area code. These clips featured John Keister and Pat Cashman and hinted strongly that the show would be a successor to Almost Live!. Subsequently, The Seattle Times published a blog article about the sequel which included behind-the-scenes glimpses at one of the sketches being filmed for the new show. Additionally, the new show has a presence on social networking Web sites such as Facebook. The show premiered on Sunday, January 6, 2013 on KING-TV after Saturday Night Live. The series would be revamped as Up Late NW (pronounced Up Late Northwest) in September 2015, and ran for one season, ending in 2016.

== Segments ==
Cast of Almost Live!

Some of the recurring segments featured on Almost Live! included:

- "Bill Nye the Science Guy". Ross Shafer is credited as the creator of the Bill Nye the Science Guy idea, encouraging then-Boeing aircraft engineer Bill Nye to demonstrate science experiments on the show. Nye later developed the segment into the Bill Nye the Science Guy TV series debuting on PBS in 1994 after airing weekly on local TV stations nationwide via first-run syndication, eventually becoming a Disney property.
- "Uncle Buzz": A parody of radio call-in shows, with Pat Cashman as the chain smoking, slick-haired Uncle Buzz doling out terrible advice.
- Win a Date with Bill Gates. The show convinced the local billionaire and later world's richest man to go on a blind date with a lucky contestant. A second version of the segment had it as Win a Date with Bill Nye before he was nationally famous.
- The Beat Goes On. An attempt by Ross Shafer to reunite Sonny & Cher with much campaigning and promotional items like buttons. This was considered Shafer's follow up stunt to his much-publicized Louie Louie campaign. To their surprise the duo chose to appear on The Late Show with David Letterman instead. Shafer would go on to other famous reunions during his stint on Fox's The Late Show.
- "Capable Woman": a super heroine who "rescues" men too "manly" to admit they can't do everything
- "Jet Guy": parody of Republic Pictures' 1950s serial character Commando Cody and played by the show’s Director of Photography/Editor Ralph Bevins.
- "Me": a talk show hosted by an obnoxiously egotistical woman who acts as if she is smarter than everyone else
- "Mind Your Manners, with Billy Quan", a parody of Bruce Lee’s martial arts films, with staff cameraman Darrell Suto in the starring role. This later became a recurring segment on the Bill Nye the Science Guy TV show.
- "Nature Walk, with Chuck": featuring a reckless, alcoholic outdoorsman, and, his naïve, young assistant, "JIMMIE!"
- "Cops In...": a parody of Cops set in – and satirizing the stereotypes about – various Seattle neighborhoods. The segment also appeared in one episode of Bill Nye the Science Guy.
- "Speed Walker": a superhero (played by Nye) who fights crime while adhering to the standards of competitive speed-walking (which rose to national prominence around 1990)
- the "High-Fivin' White Guys": a group of excessively exuberant, young, middle-class, Caucasian males with low self-awareness who "go out on the town" all over greater Seattle (and once in Vancouver, BC, in the sketch "High-Fiving White Guys go to Canada")
- "Ineffectual Middle-Management Suck-ups"
- "A Woman's Place": sketches featuring Tracey Conway and Hollyce Phillips
- "The John Report" [1990-1995]/"The Late Report" [1995-1999]: a weekly news-parody by Keister, similar to SNL's Weekend Update
- "The Lame List", or, "What’s Weak This Week": a parody of 1980s/1990s Grunge/slacker culture, featuring "members of Seattle's heavy metal community" who disapprovingly react to a list of hypothetical, everyday situations (e.g., jobs that start in the morning; girlfriends who won't give us beer money) by repeatedly yelling "Lame!". Each list includes an additional, out-of-place, sophisticated hypothetical (e.g., Eastern European nations shifting to a free market economy), to which the metalheads react with blank bewilderment. Participants included local DJ Jeff Gilbert, Kim Thayil of Soundgarden, Matt and Chris Fox of Bitter End, Tony Benjamins and Brad Hull of Forced Entry, Marty Chandler of Panic, KGRG DJ Ron Williams, Jeff Hubbard (head roadie of the band Alice in Chains) and other Seattle-area musicians.
- "Sluggy": a parody of "Lassie" about a little boy and his pet slug.
- "The Survivalist": a paranoid man broadcasting a public-access-type show from his underground bunker
- "This Here Place": a parody of PBS' This Old House, featuring poorly- and lazily-done home repair projects
- "The Worst Girlfriend In The World": features dating 'horror stories', with Tracey Conway as the Girlfiend
- "Uncle Fran's Musical Forest": featuring an embittered, burned-out children's-show host and a raccoon hand puppet named Mr. Raccoon Man. The same Uncle Fran character later appeared on the Bill Nye the Science Guy series.
- "Urban Wildlife" mocked the idiosyncrasies of Seattle hipsters' and professionals' methods of social interaction (clothes, slang, etc.) in the style of a narrated nature show.
- "Street Talk": one-word clips from man-on-the-street/local celebrity Q&A interviews – with the questions & answers played-back in an intentionally mismatched order, resulting in the questions being 'answered' in nonsensically funny ways. This bit was later used as the basis for a CBS pilot co-created and produced by Scott Schaefer, and hosted by Bill Maher.
- "Qwik Fishin'": John Keister and Pat Cashman as redneck fishermen on Lake Washington.
- "Subtitle Theater": a couple speaks to each other but subtitles show what they are really thinking.

Some sketches were borrowed for the Fox TV series Haywire, in 1990.
