= Busking (disambiguation) =

Busking is a form of public entertainment also known as street performance.

Busking may also refer to:

- Busking (U.S. case law)
- Busking, an album by Mike Doughty
- Busking, an album by Jon English
- Busking Day
