= Mustard =

Mustard may refer to:

== Food and plants ==
- Mustard (condiment), a paste or sauce made from mustard seeds used as a condiment
- Mustard plant, one of several plants, having seeds that are used for the condiment
  - Mustard seed, small, round seeds of the mustard plant used in cooking
- Mustard greens (Brassica juncea), edible leaves from a variety of mustard plant
- Mustard oil
- Mustard family, or Brassicaceae, a family of plants
- Mustard tree, or Salvadora persica
- Betel vine, produces the fresh fruit mustard stick
- Tomalley, sometimes called the "mustard" of a crab or lobster

== Science and technology ==
- Mustard (color), a dull/dark shade of yellow, similar to the color of the condiment
- BAC Mustard (Multi-Unit Space Transport and Recovery Device), an experimental British spacecraft
- Mustard gas or sulfur mustard, a chemical weapon
- Nitrogen mustard, chemotherapy agents derived from mustard gas

== Other uses ==
- Mustard (name), including a list of people with the name
- Mustard (album), by English musician Roy Wood
- Colonel Mustard, a character in the board game Cluedo, otherwise known as Clue
- Mustard (My Hero Academia), a character in the manga series My Hero Academia
- Mustard (music producer)

- Mustard!

== See also ==
- Mustard plaster, a traditional medical treatment used to treat minor ailments, made from mustard seed powder
- Garden cress, also referred to as mustard and cress, an edible herb used as a filling or garnish for a variety of dishes
- The Mustard Seed (disambiguation)
