= World Famous Bushman =

American busker (active 1980-2014)

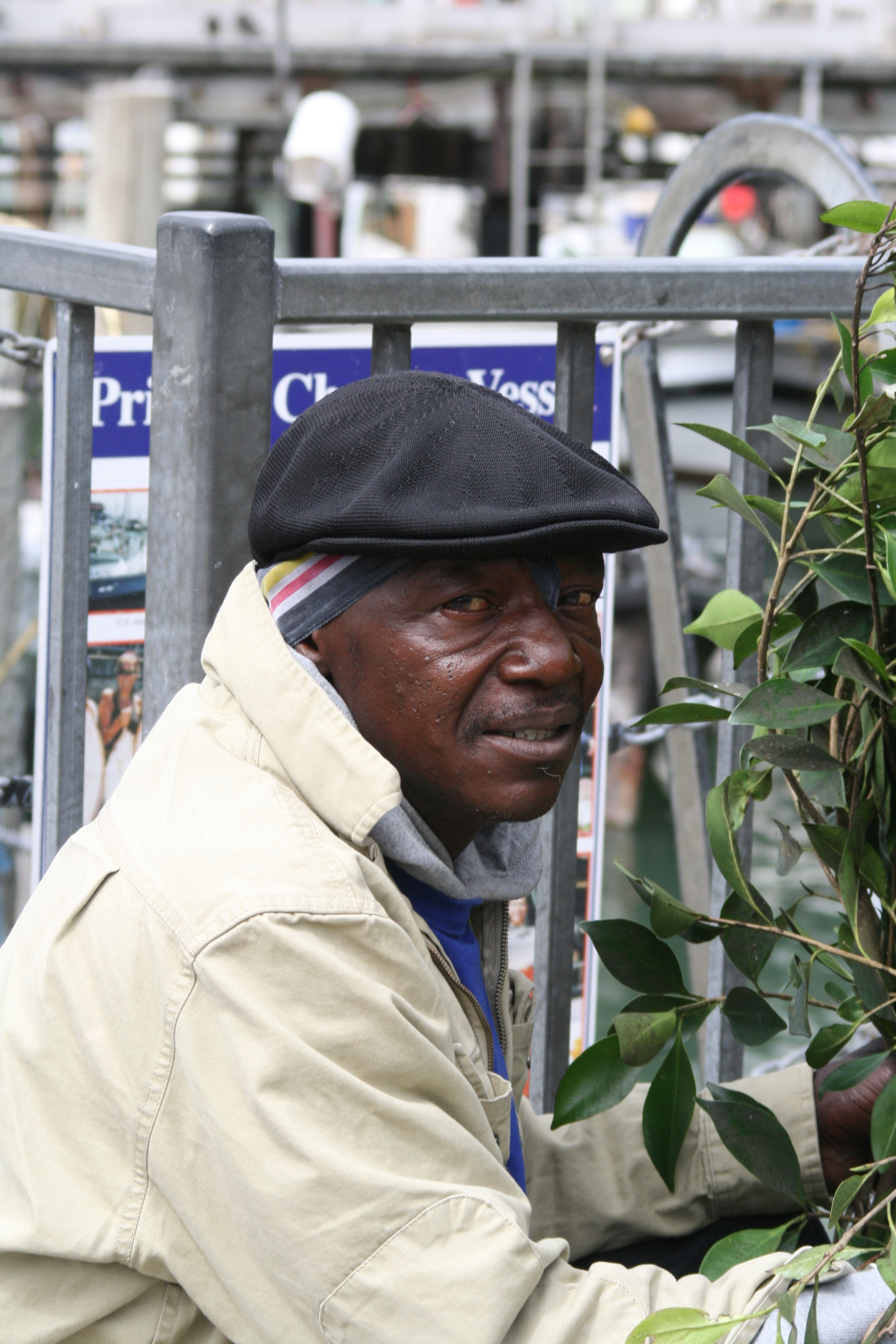
- David Johnson aka The Bushman in August 2007
- Born: David Johnson
- Occupation: Busker
- Years active: 1980–2019

The Bushman
- Born: Gregory Jacobs
- Died: February 23, 2014
- Occupation: Busker
- Years active: 1980–2014

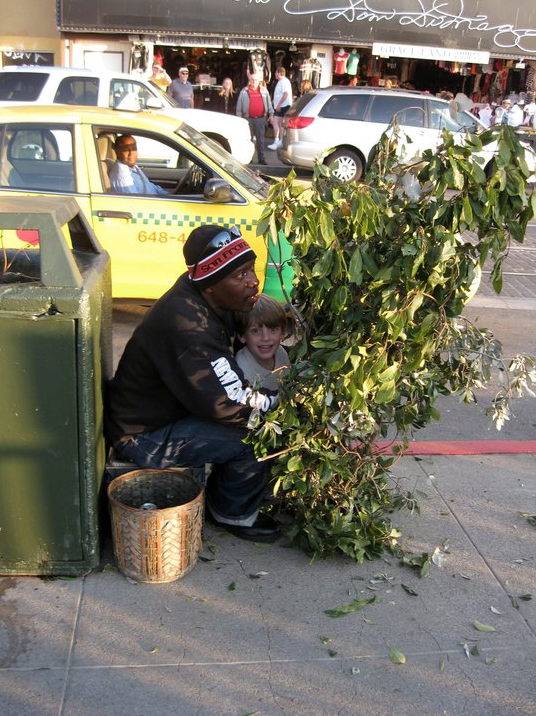
Johnson involves a passing child in his act

The World Famous Bushman was a street-performance act associated with San Francisco buskers David Johnson and Gregory Jacobs at Fisherman's Wharf. Johnson's act involved hiding behind a makeshift bush and suddenly startling approaching passers-by, while Jacobs at times worked with him as a partner and bodyguard.

From the 1990s until Jacobs's death in 2014, the two performed both together and separately, and accounts differ over which man originated the act. A 1999 San Francisco Chronicle article described Johnson as the original Bushman and Jacobs as a later partner, while a 2009 account stated that Jacobs devised the act and recruited Johnson. The performance attracted crowds but also generated complaints from merchants and members of the public. In 2004, Johnson was acquitted of four misdemeanours arising from his act, after which prosecutors dropped the remaining public-nuisance complaints against him. Jacobs died of heart failure on 23 February 2014, while Johnson continued performing until 2019.

== Performance and legal disputes ==
Johnson performed at Fisherman's Wharf by sitting motionless behind a bundle of branches and leaves and suddenly moving or rising as unsuspecting passers-by approached, sometimes accompanying the movement with growls or shouted noises. People who had been startled sometimes remained nearby to watch him surprise subsequent passers-by. Crowds also gathered to watch the act and leave tips.

Crowds usually watched Johnson from across the street as he performed. Johnson claimed that in a "good year" he could earn $60,000 from the act.

The act also generated complaints from some members of the public and from Fisherman's Wharf merchants, and police repeatedly cited Johnson as a public nuisance. In 2004, a jury acquitted him of four misdemeanours arising from his street performance, after which the district attorney's office dropped the remaining public-nuisance complaints against him.

== Two Bushmen ==
From the 1990s until the death of Gregory Jacobs in 2014, two World Famous Bushmen operated on Fisherman's Wharf both as a team and as separate acts, each claiming to be the first to come up with the act. Initially, the two worked together, with Johnson as performer and Jacobs working the crowd and collecting money. A 1999 San Francisco Chronicle account described Jacobs as Johnson's full partner and bodyguard; as well as protecting Johnson from hostile reactions, Jacobs distracted approaching tourists and warned Johnson when elderly people were approaching.

A 2009 article in SFSU's Xpress Magazine said:

Many people are unaware that there are, in fact, two Bushmen. When Gregory Jacobs first came up with this gig, he recruited David Johnson, a man he met at Fisherman's Wharf. As they worked together they developed a close friendship. Johnson's deep voice scares those who unknowingly pass by the man-made bush. Back then, Johnson would hold the bush and Jacobs would tell the jokes, entertain those watching the action, and collect the tips. It has been about fifteen years, and now they are complete enemies. Jacobs accuses Johnson of running off with their money. Jacobs tries to avoid any conflicts with Johnson by not working where and when he is.

However, the San Francisco Chronicle ran an article in 1999 suggesting that Johnson was the original Bushman, joined by Jacobs in the 1990s. That article, which caused the act to become a nationwide sensation after being picked up by newspapers across the United States, reports that Jacobs joined Johnson in a bodyguard role as well as to help with the act: "'I look after him,' says Gregory Jacobs, who recently joined the act as a full partner. 'I watch his back.'"

Greg Jacobs was featured in the video "Act (Diogenes)" by the artist Whitney Lynn. Jacobs was also the subject of a short film, The Bush Man. Gregory Jacobs died February 23, 2014, due to heart failure at the age of 60 years old, whilst Johnson remained active until 2019.

== See also ==
- Busking (U.S. case law)
- Frank Chu
- Emperor Norton
