= Yellow mustard =

Yellow mustard refers to:

- the condiment American yellow mustard
- the plant white mustard (Sinapis alba)
- the North American plant Streptanthus flavescens, syn. Guillenia flavescens
- Mustard White butterfly Pieris oleracea

== See also ==
- Mustard (disambiguation)
