= The Piccadilly Rats =

English street theatre group

Gaz Stanley and the Piccadilly Rats is a well-known busking band and street theatre performance act in Manchester, England.

== Formation ==
The Piccadilly Rats were formed in early 2013 by Gaz Stanley, Heath Dean and Kenny Wheaver. Beginning as a street busking duo / trio, they gradually expanded to a six piece street performance act by late 2013 and became notorious for their rough-and-ready cover versions of old pop and rock standards and their Rat masks (of which the drummer and bass player were often seen sporting whilst they were performing) as well as off-beat play-acting routines sometimes interspersed between actual songs.The street theatre aspect of the band was an integral part of their early performance. They were increasing popular and notorious among locals and visitors.They eventually settled mainly on just playing straight rock'n'roll and pop covers.

== Band members ==
Gaz Stanley (full name Garry Stanley Smith) was born on 19 December 1957 at Boundary Park Hospital Oldham, Greater Manchester. He first lived in Middleton and later Harpurhey where he attended Harpur Mount school and later Moston Brook for Boys. After leaving school he started work as a van boy for Barrs soft drinks and then British Rail then numerous other jobs. Gaz Stanley is also a former actor and was first represented by Nigel Martin Smith (former Take That Manager). He had small speaking roles in numerous TV Dramas such as Burn It, Cops, Shameless and That Peter Kay Thing as well as a cameo in the 808 State vs UB40 video for 'One In Ten' from 1992. Gaz Stanley is married with 3 grown up children and 2 grandchildren.

Garry and Heath were later augmented by the arrival of David Copeland (aka Dave the Rave), a former scrapyard depot worker who met Garry busking in the street when the original drummer Heath had momentarily gone AWOL, offering his services; then former hairdresser and general 'vibemaster' Ray Boddington, who was already performing around town in his own right and had become an increasingly regular collaborator in their street line-up. Ray had previously met Gaz Stanley in 2007 on Manchester's Market Street but didn't work with the Piccadilly Rats until 2013, becoming a distinctive presence with his unique dance moves and street attire.

Ray Boddington was born on 30 December 1941 in Levenshulme. At the age of 5 he was admitted to a children's hospital and diagnosed with Polio: his prognosis was initially bleak (he was given 12 months) but he made a full recovery after 7 years. At the age of 12 he went to Baguley Hall Secondary Modern and taught himself the harmonica. His father, Walter, played in the Phil Moss Showband for 20 years, they were the resident band at the Ritz Ballroom in Manchester. His mother was also a talented pianist. At 15, he trained as an amateur boxer at Proctor's Gym in Hulme. He signed for Ace Artists when he was 16 and played on the same bill as Dorothy Squires and Karl Denver. As a teenager, he played at the famous Band On The Wall venue in the late 1950's and also appeared at Bernard Manning's venue the Embassy Club and the Domino Club where he opened for acts Herman's Hermits and the Everly Brothers. Ray also did a summer residence at Butlins Holiday Camp in Rhyl: around this time he met world-famous harmonica player Larry Adler, who was very impressed with his style of playing.

By March 2013, they were joined by a third percussionist/drummer - Buster Rabcat (aka Pin / Martin Gray) - a publicity-shy maverick artist, performer and drummer/percussionist who was born in Wavertree, Liverpool in the 1960's and moved to Manchester in 1988 at the height of the city's then blossoming club and music scene. Buster had already previously played in a variety of local bands and collectives, most notably the Manchester-based punk band Goldblade (as well as various other acts such as !Basher!, Wedding In Rio, No. 1 Blue Murder and his own Aggrokulture noise project), and who also had a background in street theatre and performance in Manchester since the mid to late 1990's. Finally the collective swelled to six members with the arrival of a local character by the name of Tommy Piggott - forever subsequently known as 'Tommy Trouble' - who was a familiar face around north and south Manchester and also a volunteer involved with the Mustard Tree organisation, which helps provide sanctuary and help for homeless, disadvantaged and vulnerable people. Together, the band presented themselves as a quite unlikely attraction on the streets of Manchester during their prime (2013-2014) when they featured three dancers.

Bobby Elliot (real name Robert Branch) joined in June 2018, as announced by the band via Twitter, playing bass guitar with the band at various live performances.

Dave Copeland died in December 2014 at the age of 66. The rest of the band played a memorial show in Manchester city centre in his honour to raise funds for his funeral, which took place at Manchester Southern Cemetery in January 2015. Ray Boddington died in April 2019 at the age of 77, after being hit by a tram on High Street.

== Appearance and image ==
Stanley originated the idea that the backing band should perform disguised in animal masks, choosing rat masks. This resulted in the band becoming a recognisable fixture on the streets of Manchester. Over time, the Rats have acquired a cult following.

There was a proposal for the band to wear different animal masks, thus creating a menagerie of supporting characters, but only monkey masks were added to the repertoire.

The Rats are also known for their unusual style of dress: Copeland dresses in hippie shirts, head scarves and bandanas, to comical effect; Piggott usually wears an old-fashioned police uniform and carries a large furry or plastic rat; Boddington wears one of a variety of suits, one of which has a Union Jack design, together with a pair of black gloves and sunglasses.

== Television and media appearances ==
In recent years, Ray Boddington has appeared on TV's X Factor, Britain's Got Talent, The Jeremy Kyle Show and Judge Rinder. The Piccadilly Rats' notoriety started to gain further momentum as a result of their crazy and unhinged performances on the streets of the city centre and by 2015 they became known to an audience of millions when they appeared on ITV's Judge Rinder in 2015 over a row involving a Mankini - and coming third in a Battle Of The Bands competition, thus losing out on the £500 first prize, which Ray Boddington wanted to contest. The entire episode was conceived as a bit of a spoof more than anything, pitching the singer Garry against dancer Ray in the courtroom; but due to the contentious nature of the case being played out (which was 100 per cent genuine as it really did happen) it became one of the most-watched episodes in the entire series, gaining millions of viewers worldwide and winning the street act even more new followers and admirers. The band have also appeared regularly in the local paper the Manchester Evening News and were invited by BBC Radio Manchester in late 2014 to do a short interview and performance live on air for an evening arts programme; however, this arrangement never came to fruition because of Dave Copeland's death in December of that year.

== Departure of the band's drummers ==
Shortly after this infamous Judge Rinder appearance, Buster Rabcat (aka Pin / Martin) quit live street performances with the Rats completely - citing his disillusionment with the publicity and being recognised on the street - and the rest of the group have since continued as a three-piece (Gaz, Ray and Tommy) minus bass player and drummer. He has since re-settled back in his home city of Liverpool, but he continues to manage the band's affairs such as running their Facebook page and being their spokesman, in addition to answering all the 'fan mail', as well as booking gigs for the band in the Manchester area. Save for occasional one-off gigs with his colleagues, he has no plans to return to the street busking set up full- or even part-time. The Rats had already lost their original drummer / bass player Heath by this point as he had simply disappeared and not reported back for duty even before the recording of the Judge Rinder episode. The band currently continue to busk on the streets with the drum stool vacant and invite members of the passing audience to 'jam' with them on the drums. Indeed, quite often they are helped out on drumming duties by two of their loyal friends - both of which are called Alan.

== Collaborations ==
Due to the ongoing absence of their regular drummer(s), the Rats have occasionally taken to playing club / indoor gigs with 'borrowed' members from another well known local Manchester band - namely Death To The Strange - specifically the rhythm section Paul Sewell on bass and Jamie Wilson on drums. This almost supergroup-like collaboration has been self-mockingly dubbed 'Death To The Piccadilly Rats' by their former drummer, now spokesman/gig manager Pin/Buster Rabcat. Paul was with the band for their Kendal Calling appearance (see below), and has since played a couple of other shows with them also with his band colleague Jamie in tow on the drums.

== Documentary ==
A documentary on the Piccadilly Rats titled Piccadilly Rats: Live in Moderation has been in production since 2014/15 with much footage of the band's performances on the streets of Manchester and also, more recently, their show on the Sunday of the Kendal Calling festival in July 2016. The film focuses on individual interviews and conversations following the key members of the band: Gaz Stanley, Ray Boddington, Tommy Trouble and Pin/Buster Rabcat set in various locations around the members' home towns. Post-production was delayed because of the pandemic but the project was eventually picked up by national award winners, The Farm Group (Manchester). In 2022 it is touring the film festival circuit, kicking off with an exclusive screening at HOME cinema, Manchester.
