= Nakane =

Nakane (written: 中根) is a Japanese surname. Notable people with the surname include:

- Arthur Nakane (born 1937), Los Angeles–based street musician and screenwriter, subject of the documentary film Secret Asian Man
- Chie Nakane (1926-2021), Japanese author and anthropologist
- Kasumi Nakane (中根かすみ; born 1982), Japanese model, gravure idol and actress
- Kazuyuki Nakane (born 1969), Japanese politician serving in the House of Representatives in the Diet
- Nakane Kōtei (1839–1913), Japanese writer who lived during the late Edo Period and early Meiji Era
- Takehiko Nakane (1920-1999), Japanese entomologist specializing in beetles

== See also ==
- Nakane Station
