= Robert Bery =

American artist

- Education: Ecole Des Beaux Arts
- Website: https://www.robertberyart.com

Robert Bery is a Manhattan-based artist working in a variety of mediums, including painting, photography, and sculpture. His work is held in many public and private collections. These include those of the Federal Reserve Bank, the Smithsonian, Alec Baldwin, Benjamin Bratt, David Bowie, Willem Dafoe, Alan Dershowitz, and the Clintons. Bery was the Lead Plaintiff in the successful Second Circuit court "Bery vs. City of New York" First Amendment case.

== Education ==
Bery's long-held view is that he is "self-taught", though he openly acknowledges his studies at the Ecole Des Beaux Arts in Paris and at the studios of Henry Moore and Jacques Lipchitz in Italy.

== "Bery vs. the City of New York" ==
Bery sued the City of New York in 1993 to fight against a law forbidding artists from selling their work on the streets without a vending license. While the case was initially denied, it was appealed and lasted for two years.

The case has been cited for precedent over 124 times since the Second District Court issued its decision in 1995. "The Second Circuit Court determined that the District Court had arrived at an erroneous conclusion, and reversed its decision by granting the artists' motion for a preliminary injunction. The case is significant for its inclusion of visual street art in the types of speech protected by the First Amendment. ...that, for purposes of content-neutral analysis, alternative channels for expression are inadequate if they are not widely available."

Villanova University published an article about Bery vs. New York in 1998 as part of the "Entertainment, Arts, and Sports Law" Digital Commons and the "First Amendment" Digital Common entitled "Bery v. New York: Do Artists Have a First Amendment Right to Sell and Display Art in Public Places"

One of Bery's personal statements about the court case, is that "...it is the biggest and most important art piece I have ever done, involving the most creativity, the most thought and energy, the most time and the biggest contribution I could make to the society."

== Artistic work ==
Bery's work can be found in many online collections, online and actual galleries and in many exhibitions each year, both in the US and abroad, including the Museum of Modern Art. He works with several art establishments in the Hamptons on Long Island, and in the Palm Beach County and South Florida areas. His "Pelican in Flight" Sculpture is at the entrance of the Barclay Club PGA National in Jupiter, Fl.

== Videography ==
Bery was near the World Trade Center on the morning of 9/11 and happened to catch somewhat rare footage of the tragedy along with New Yorkers' initial responses to it. He eventually sold this footage to CNN. The footage has been the subject of controversy among conspiracy theorists and is discussed on many subversive websites questioning whether CNN maintained objectivity in its coverage of 9/11 in the weeks following the terrorist attack. Bery himself has no involvement in any of the topic matter or the controversy.
