= Tuba Man =

American tuba player in Seattle, Washington (1955–2008)

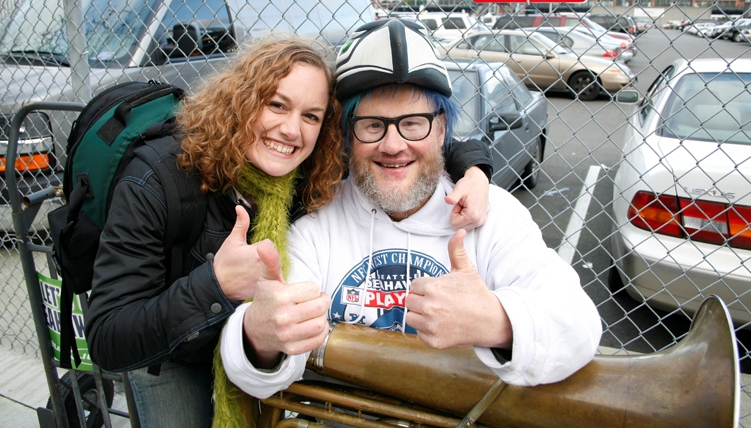
McMichael (at right, in 2006)

Edward Scott McMichael (March 15, 1955 – November 3, 2008), also known as the Tuba Man, was an American tubist who became well known in Seattle for street performing outside the city's various sports and performing arts venues during the 1990s and 2000s. McMichael played outside the Kingdome, KeyArena, McCaw Hall, Safeco Field, and Qwest Field, among other venues.

McMichael was known for playing songs appropriate for the climate of the venue where he was playing, such as "Happy Days Are Here Again" during the Seattle Mariners' successful 1995 season; for adapting mainstream rock and roll songs to the tuba; and for wearing funny, often colorful hats while he played.

== Early life ==
McMichael graduated in the mid-1970s from King's Garden High School. He played in the band at North Seattle Community College, and in the Seattle Youth Symphony. He also played in the Bellevue Philharmonic, Everett Symphony and Cascade Symphony.

== Death ==
According to police, on October 25, 2008, a group of youths beat and robbed McMichael near Seattle Center just after midnight. The attackers punched and kicked McMichael as he lay on the ground in the fetal position. He was treated at a hospital, but died November 3, 2008, aged 53 years old. Seattle Post-Intelligencer columnist Robert Jamieson wrote a front-page story about McMichael's life and death, while KOMO 1000 commentators Ken Schram and John Carlson interrupted 2008 election coverage to organize a memorial fund for McMichael. Seattle Seahawks officials helped to organize a November 12, 2008, public memorial at Qwest Field Events Center that was attended by 1,500 people. A Seattle Youth Symphony scholarship will be established in McMichael's name.

=== Perpetrators ===
Three teenagers were sentenced to detention for manslaughter in connection with the death of McMichael. One was sentenced to serve up to 36 weeks, and the other two were sentenced to serve up to 72 weeks, including the time already spent in custody (about 24 weeks). The two other suspects have not been found and their whereabouts are unknown. In regard to the two at-large suspects, the Seattle Police Department's morning press release stated: "Unfortunately, the only description that we have is that the suspects were black males in their mid-teens."

The DA who prosecuted the case told the Seattle Times that because no eyewitnesses came forward after McMichael was assaulted and robbed, he was not legally able to charge the perpetrators as adults and seek longer prison terms for their actions, and was limited to the standards of juvenile criminal law instead. Ja'mari Alexander-Alan Jones, who at age 15 served six months for killing McMichael, pleaded guilty on December 10, 2014, to the murder of DeShawn Milliken and was sentenced to 18 years in prison. Fellow Tuba Man killer Billy Chambers was later convicted of a firearms charge and sentenced to 6 years in prison.
