= Mustard (name) =

Notable people with the name Mustard include:

- Chad Mustard (born 1977), American football tight end
- Deanna Mustard (born 1980), American voice actress
- DJ Mustard (born Dijon McFarlane in 1990), American music producer and DJ
- Ernest Mustard (1893–1971), World War I flying ace
- Fred Mustard Stewart (1932–2007), American novelist
- Jack Mustard, English professional association footballer
- James Fraser Mustard (1927–2011), Canadian physician and scientist
- John F. Mustard, American planetary scientist
- Phil Mustard (born 1982), English cricketer
- William Thornton Mustard (1914–1987), Canadian physician and cardiac surgeon
