= Street performing (U.S. case law) =

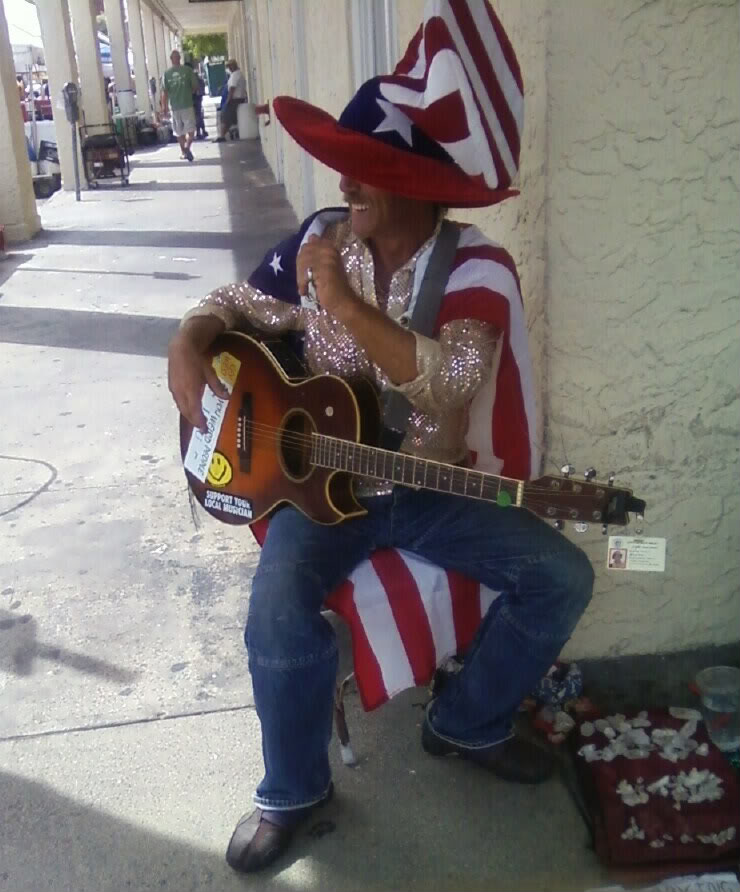
Street performer on Duval Street, Key West, Florida with displayed permit on guitar

In the United States there have been numerous legal cases about regulations and laws that have decided the rights of street performers to perform in public. Most of these laws and regulations have been found to be unconstitutional when challenged. In the US, free speech is considered a fundamental right of every individual, guaranteed by the First and Fourteenth constitutional amendments, and in the majority of legal cases it has been concluded that practicing artistic free speech is legal. Street performing is legally considered to be artistic free speech and is protected, just as is panhandling or begging.

In the United States, reasons to regulate or ban street performing behavior include public safety issues and noise issues in certain areas such as hospital zones and residential zones. In residential zones, a reasonable curfew may be allowed. Such laws must be narrowly tailored to eliminate only the perceived evils by limiting the time, place, and manner that street performing may be practiced. They must also leave open reasonable alternative venues. The only exceptions to these free speech rules are sedition, as defined by the Smith Act, public displays of pornography and obscenity as defined by the Miller test for obscenity, criminal behavior such as fraud or defamation, certain commercial advertising and the common laws talked about above. In the US, laws regulating or banning street performing must be applied evenly to all forms of free speech according to the first and fourteenth constitutional amendments and the judicial decisions listed below.

Street performing cannot be prohibited in an area where other forms of free speech are not prohibited. For example, if street performing is regulated or banned but people are allowed to conduct free speech behavior for pickets, protests, religious, political, educational, sports, commercial or other purposes, then the law is illegal. In the United States any form of regulation on artistic free speech must not be judgmental, and permits must not be so restrictive, complex, difficult or expensive to obtain that they inhibit free speech. It is also unlawful per federal court decision for law officers to seize a performer's instruments.

Under Title 18, U.S.C., Section 241 Conspiracy Against Rights, it is unlawful for two or more persons to conspire to injure, oppress, threaten, or intimidate any person of any state, territory or district in the free exercise or enjoyment of any right or privilege secured to him/her by the Constitution or the laws of the United States, or because of his/her having exercised the same.

Under United States law, it is the express duty of all officers of the law or individuals such as security guards, legislators, mayors, Council Persons, judges, Hospitals and Nursing Home Proprietors, etc., to protect and preserve an individual's constitutional rights Under Title 18, U.S.C., Section 242 - Deprivation of Rights Under Color of Law. Most of these individuals take oaths to uphold the US Constitution. It is clearly a violation of federal law for these individuals to violate people's constitutional or civil rights under the color of the law.

== Cases ==
Year	Case law
1970	In the late 1920s and early 1930s, street performing had grown to be quite a controversial enterprise in New York. The country was in the midst of a horrible economic depression and many people had turned to street performing as a source of income. Street performers were everywhere and fights over pitches were alarmingly common between the street performers themselves and the street performers, merchants, and vendors. Out of frustration over the complaining, fighting, and violence, Mayor Fiorello La Guardia had banned street performing in New York on the grounds of safety issues regarding the escalating conflicts. Street performing went on, but on a much smaller scale. If anybody complained about a street performer, at their discretion, the police could order the street performer to move on or could even arrest him or her. In 1970 poet Allen Ginsberg challenged the constitutionality of this ban. The ban was lifted in 1970 after being found to be unconstitutional by Mayor John V. Lindsay.
1979	In Goldstein v. Town of Nantucket, the Town of Nantucket had tried to regulate street performers as vendors, which the court did not accept as valid. Local businesses had complained about the competition from street artists.
1983	In Davenport v. City of Alexandria, Virginia, a judge ruled that a ban on street performing and other business-related activities on the streets of the central city area was unconstitutional. Several courts found that there was no legitimacy to the city's allegations of safety issues that were alleged to be related to street performing.
1985	In Friedrich v. Chicago, 619 F. Supp., 1129. D.C. Ill., a Chicago court ruled in favor of allowing street performers in the city. In Chicago street performing was restricted in certain areas. In the decision, street performers won injunctive relief from the city's enforcement of the ban in some of the contested areas. They also obtained relief from a permit scheme on the use of amplifiers because the scheme was judgmental and at the discretion of the issuers.
1990	In Carew-Reid et al. vs. Ny Metropolitan Transportation Authority et al., street performers defeated a ban on the use of electronic amplifiers on the NY subways. The courts ruled that it was the volume of the sound, not the use of amplifiers, that was at issue.
1991	In Jews For Jesus, Inc. vs. Massachusetts Bay Transportation Authority, a religious group defeated the banning of expressive behavior with a captive audience in paid areas.
1996	In Bery v. New York, 97 F. 3d 684, 2d Cir., local businesses had complained about the competition from street artists, visual artists won the right to sell their art.
1997	In Harry Perry and Robert "Jingles" Newman v. Los Angeles Police Department, argued as Case 96-55545 before the Ninth Circuit Court Of Appeals, street performers won the right to perform and sell their original music CDs and tapes on the street. Local businesses had complained about the competition from street artists and tried to prohibit street performing.
1999	In Turley v. NYC, US 2nd Cir Appeal 98-7114, argued in 1999, the judge ruled that New York City street performing permit schemes were too complex and difficult to obtain, and that the costs were unreasonably high. Turley also won relief prohibiting the seizure of instruments by police.
2001	Street Performers won a lawsuit in Waikiki, Hawaii. After local businesses had complained about the competition from street performers, they got the city to push through an ordinance to ban street performing on a very popular area, allegedly for safety reasons. But the street performers prevailed in court by proving the safety concerns were not founded.
2003	District Judge Henry Lee Adams Jr. issued an injunction barring the city of St. Augustine, Florida from enforcing a recent ordinance banning street performances on St. George Street. Local businesses had complained about the competition from street performers. Judge Adams's order stated, "Street performances are a form of expression protected by the First and Fourteenth Amendments of the United States Constitution." Merchants got the city to ban street performing for alleged safety issues. After public outcry, and a lawsuit with Judge Adams decision, St. Augustine acceded and as of March 2003 allows street performing.
2004	A San Francisco street performier known as the World Famous Bushman was charged with four public nuisance misdemeanors. A jury cleared him of the first complaint, and the district attorney subsequently dropped the remaining complaints.
2005	A judge rejected Seattle Center rules on street performers. "Magic Mike" Berger, a magician and balloon-twisting street performer, took the Seattle Center to court and won injunctive relief and a court ordered settlement of over US $47,000. Seattle Center had some of the most liberal rules regarding street performing but even they could not pass constitutional muster. The business improvement district formed to manage Seattle Center claimed that they had the right to manage 62 square blocks in the center of the city like private property. They wanted to limit street performers by giving preference to approved street performers, regulating the times, places, and numbers of street performers performing. The judge rejected the regulations, pointing out that... "while a street performer cannot offer a meek oral request for a donation from passers by, a beggar who does not perform can solicit Seattle Center visitors with relative impunity, subject only to general criminal prohibitions on aggressive panhandling."
2007	9th Circuit Decision filed on August 29, 2007 affirmed artist Steve White's right to display, and sell his original self-expressive art in the public fora. White v. City of Sparks [Nevada] (500 F.3d 953) addressed prior restraint in licensing schemes, it reaches into other areas of law not seen in other opinions "Nor are we convinced by the city’s argument that White’s sale of his paintings removes them from the ambit of protected expression. “[T]he degree of First Amendment protection is not diminished merely because the [protected expression] is sold rather than given away.” City of Lakewood v. Plain Dealer Pub. Co., 486 U.S. 750, 756 n.5 (1988); see also Riley v. Nat’l Fed’n of the Blind of N. C., 487 U.S. 781, 801 (1988) (“It is well settled that a speaker’s rights are not lost merely because compensation is received; a speaker is no less a speaker because he or she is paid to speak.”); Village of Schaumburg v. Citizens for a Better Env’t, 444 U.S. 620, 633 (1980).
2010	Judge blocks Venice boardwalk permit system. U.S. District Judge Dean D. Pregerson says the lottery system for performers and sellers violates the 1st Amendment. He also strikes down a rule barring the use of musical instruments or amplified sound between 9 am and sunset in designated areas.
