= Busking Day =

Organized events for street performers

Busking days are events organised by councils, municipalities, community groups or other organisations to encourage busking in the town, city or other location on a specific day or number of days in a year. Many busking days have become established events, occurring yearly. Some busking days have transformed into street entertainment festivals where the acts are booked and paid an appearance fee or paid an appearance fee and also allowed to 'hat' the audiences. Hatting being the traditional means that acts receive payment for their performances.

In 2010, PRS for Music called on a national busking day in the UK as well as the creation of 'busk stops' to act as a designated area where buskers can play in every town across the country. The campaign is currently being supported by the member of parliament Kevin Brennan, who raised the idea as an early day motion. Busk in London hosted National Busking Day across the UK in 2015. This has grown to International Busking Day in July 2016, with 120 cities around the world taking part. International Busking Day kick starts the Busk in London Festival, Trafalgar Square.

caption
Name of Event	Location	Country	Year Started	Date Occurs Each Year
Singapore Buskers Festival	Singapore	Singapore	1996	
International Busker Festival	Halifax	Canada	Ferrara	Italy
International Comedy & Buskers Festival	Coffs Harbour	Australia		October
World Buskers Festival	Christchurch	New Zealand		
All Ireland Busker Festival	Newcastle	Eire	2001	
International Busking Day	Wembley Park	UK	2018 onwards	July
Busking Day (Wymondham Music Festival)	Wymondham	UK		

== See also ==
- Busking
