= The Mustard Seed =

The Mustard Seed may refer to:

- Parable of the Mustard Seed, a parable told by Jesus
- The Mustard Seed (restaurant), a restaurant in Ireland

== See also ==
- Mustard seed, the seed of the mustard plant
- Kisa Gotami, featuring in a Buddhist story about mustard seeds
