= Street performance =

Performing in public places for gratuities or to be seen only

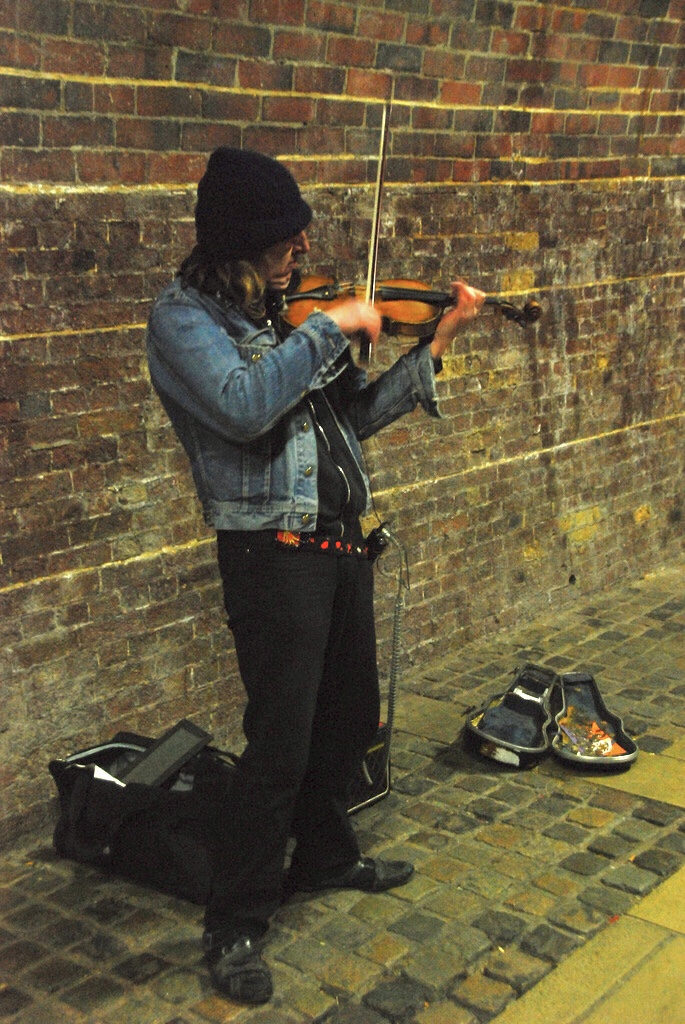
A busker in south London. Their violin case is open nearby to accept donations from passers by.

Street performance or busking is the act of performing in public places for gratuities. In many countries, the rewards are generally in the form of money but other gratuities such as food, drink or gifts may be given. Street performance is practiced all over the world and dates back to antiquity. People engaging in this practice are called street performers or buskers.

Performances are anything that people find entertaining, including acrobatics, animal tricks, balloon twisting, caricatures, clowning, comedy, contortions, escapology, dance, singing, fire skills, flea circus, fortune-telling, juggling, magic, mime, living statue, musical performance, one man band, puppeteering, snake charming, storytelling or reciting poetry or prose, street art such as sketching and painting, street theatre, sword swallowing, ventriloquism, weightlifting and washboarding. Buskers may be solo performers or small groups.

== Etymology ==
The term busking was first noted in the English language around the middle 1860s in the United Kingdom. The verb to busk, from the word busker, comes from the Spanish root word buscar, with the meaning "to seek". The Spanish word buscar in turn evolved from the Indo-European word *bhudh-skō ("to win, conquer"). It was used for many street acts, and was the title of a famous Spanish book about one of them, El Buscón.

== History ==
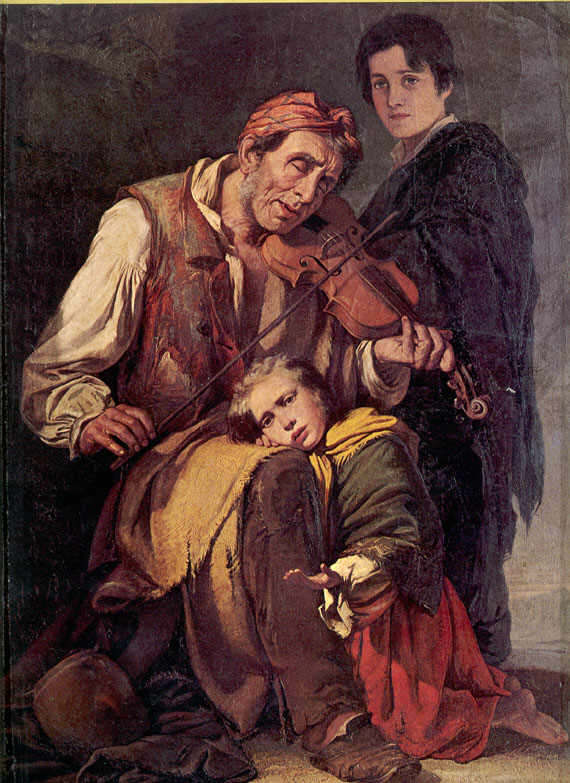
1855 painting of a street musician, O Pobre Rabequista (The Poor Rabeca Player), by José Rodrigues

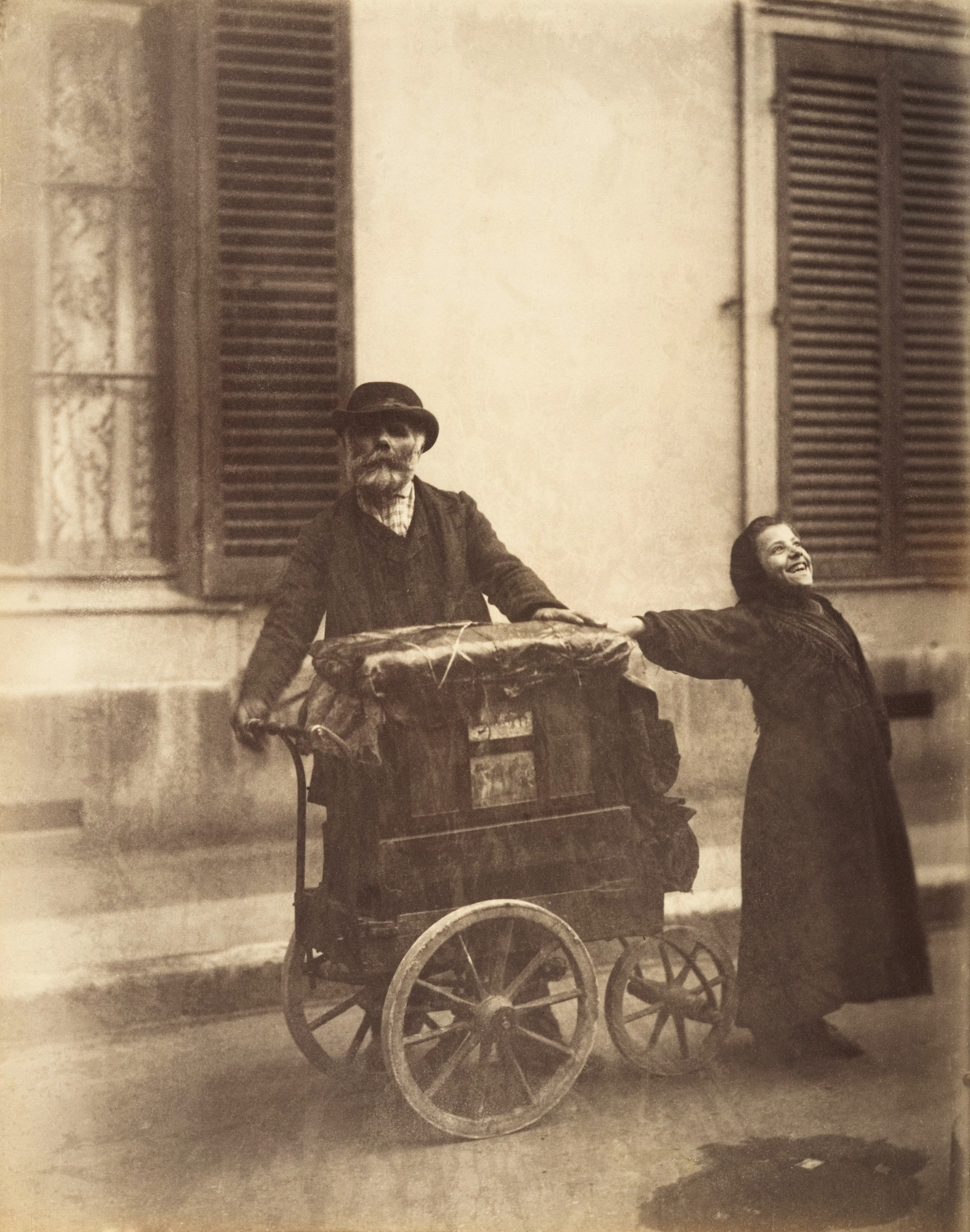
An organ grinder in Paris, photographed by Eugène Atget, c. 1898–99

There have been performances in public places for gratuities in every major culture in the world, dating back to antiquity. For many musicians, street performance was the most common means of employment before the advent of recording and personal electronics. Prior to that, a person had to produce any music or entertainment, save for a few mechanical devices such as the barrel organ, the music box, and the piano roll. Organ grinders were commonly found busking in the 19th century and early 20th century.

Busking is common among some Romani people. Romantic mention of Romani music, dancers and fortune tellers are found in all forms of song poetry, prose and lore. The Roma brought the word busking to England by way of their travels along the Mediterranean coast to Spain and the Atlantic Ocean and then up north to England and the rest of Europe.

In medieval France, buskers were known by the terms troubadours and jongleurs. In northern France, they were known as trouveres. In old German, buskers were known as Minnesingers and Spielleute. In obsolete French, it evolved to busquer for "seek, prowl" and was generally used to describe prostitutes. In Russia, buskers are called skomorokh, and their first recorded history appears around the 11th century.

Mariachis, Mexican bands that play a style of music by the same name, frequently busk when they perform while traveling through streets and plazas, as well as in restaurants and bars.

We like playing for big crowds, and the goal all along has been for people to pay a little to come and see us. But it all started on street corners, and that is still very connected to what we do. It's such a validating musical experience. Busking is a very humble and brave act that takes courage to do well. It's also about the energy of music being alive outside in a city ... You can walk right by it right in front of you. Sure, to some people you're just another guy with his hand out, so sometimes busking can be great social barometer. You're able to gauge who you live with on earth.

— Ketch Secor, Old Crow Medicine Show

Around the mid-19th century Japanese Chindonya started to be seen using their skills for advertising, and these street performers are still occasionally seen in Japan. Another Japanese street performance form dating from the Edo period is Nankin Tamasudare, in which the performer creates large figures using a bamboo mat.

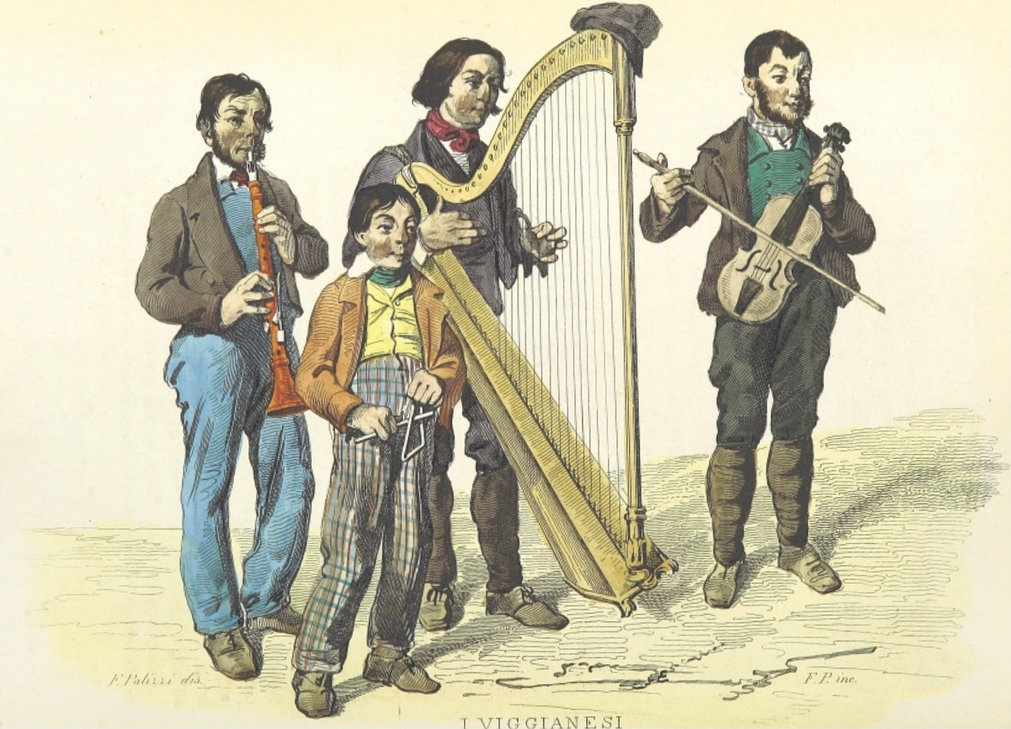
I Viggianesi, street musicians from Viggiano, Italy. Work by Filippo Palizzi, 1853

In the 19th century, Italian street musicians (mainly from Liguria, Emilia Romagna, Basilicata) began to roam worldwide in search of fortune. Musicians from Basilicata, especially the so-called Viggianesi, would later become professional instrumentalists in symphonic orchestras, especially in the United States. The street musicians from Basilicata are sometimes cited as an influence on Hector Malot's Sans Famille.

In the United States, medicine shows proliferated in the 19th century. They were traveling vendors selling elixirs and potions which purportedly improved people's health. They would often employ entertainment acts as a way of drawing in potential clients and relaxing them. The people would often associate this feeling of well-being with the products sold. After these performances, they would "pass the hat".

One-man bands have historically performed as buskers playing a variety of instruments simultaneously. One-man bands proliferated in urban areas in the 19th and early 20th centuries and still perform to this day. A current one-man band plays all their instruments acoustically usually combining a guitar, a harmonica, a drum and a tambourine. They may also include singing. Many still busk but some are booked to play at festivals and other events.

Folk music has always been an important part of the busking scene. Cafe, restaurant, bar and pub busking is a mainstay of this art form. The delta bluesmen were mostly itinerant musicians emanating from the Mississippi Delta region of the USA around the early 1940s and on. B.B. King is one famous example who came from these roots.

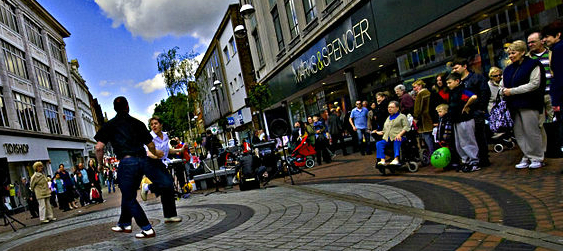
Dancers in Sutton High Street, Sutton, London, England

The counterculture of the hippies of the 1960s occasionally staged "be-ins", which resembled some present-day buskers festivals. Bands and performers would gather at public places and perform for free, passing the hat to make money. The San Francisco Bay Area was at the epicenter of this movement – be-ins were staged at Golden Gate Park and San Jose's Bee Stadium and other venues. Some of the bands that performed in this manner were Janis Joplin with Big Brother and the Holding Company, the Grateful Dead, Jefferson Airplane, Quicksilver Messenger Service, Country Joe and the Fish, Moby Grape and Jimi Hendrix.

Christmas caroling can also be a form of busking, as wassailing included singing for alms, wassail or some other form of refreshment such as figgy pudding. In the Republic of Ireland, the traditional Wren Boys, and in England Morris Dancing can be considered part of the busking tradition.

In India and Pakistan's Gujarati region, Bhavai is a form of street art where there are plays enacted in the village, the barot or the village singer also is part of the local entertainment scene.

In the 2000s, some performers have begun "Cyber Busking". Artists post work or performances on the Internet for people to download or "stream" and if people like it they make a donation using PayPal.

== Forms ==
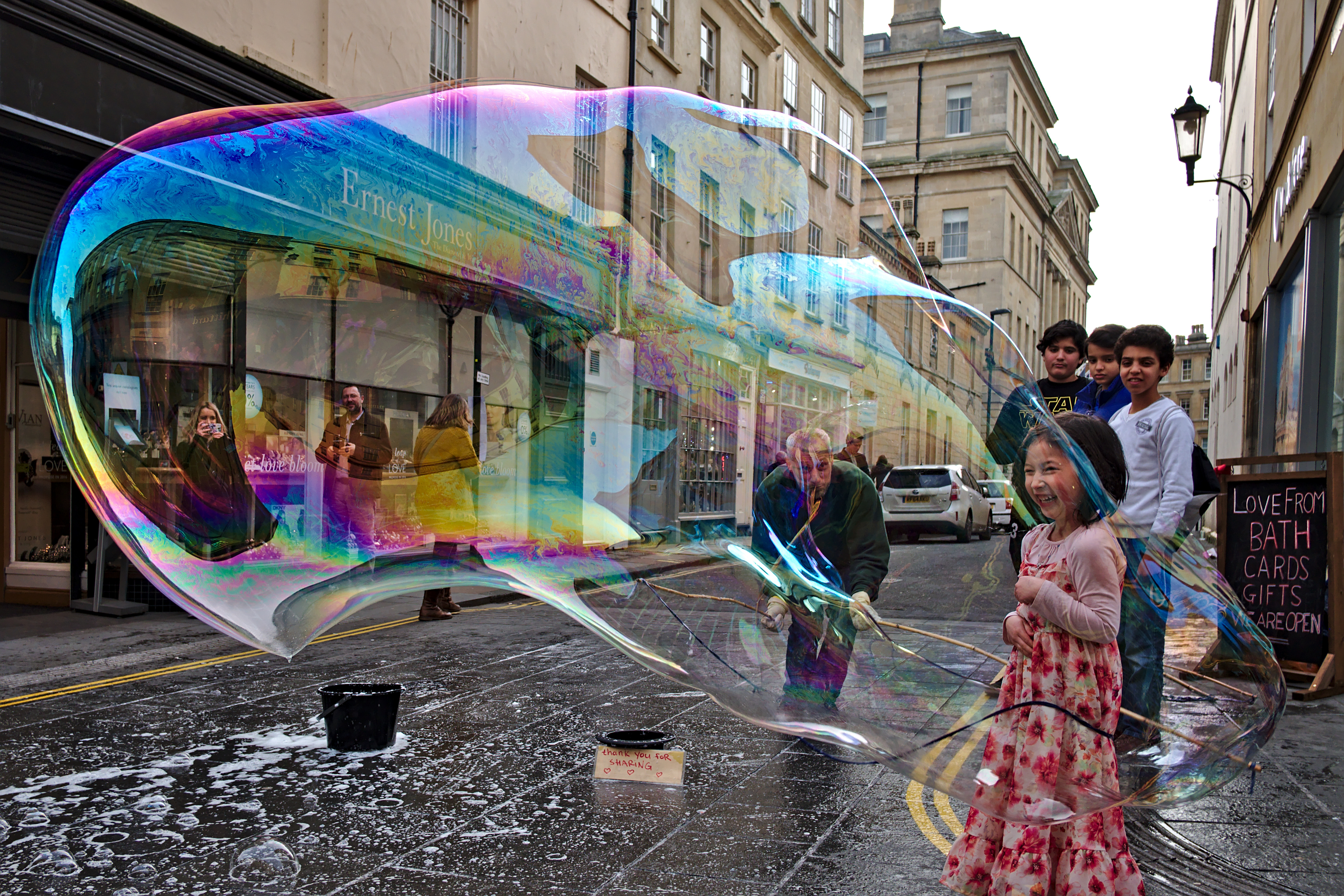
A walk-by street performer blowing large bubbles in Bath, United Kingdom

There are three basic forms of street performance: circle shows, walk-by acts, and stoplight performances.

"Circle shows" are shows that tend to gather a crowd around them. They usually have a distinct beginning and end. Usually these are done in conjunction with street theatre, puppeteering, magicians, comedians, acrobats, jugglers and sometimes musicians. Circle shows can be the most lucrative. Sometimes the crowds attracted can be very large. A good busker will control the crowd so the patrons do not obstruct foot traffic.

"Walk-by acts" are acts where the busker performs a musical, living statue or other act that does not have a distinct beginning or end, and the public usually watches for a brief time. A walk-by act may turn into a circle show if the act is unusual or very popular.

"Stoplight performances" are performances in which performers present their act and get contributions from vehicle occupants on a crosswalk while the traffic lights are red. A variety of disciplines can be used in such a format (juggling, break dancing, even magic tricks). Because of the short period of time available to them, stoplight performers must have a very brief, condensed routine. This form is seen more commonly in Latin America than elsewhere.

=== Collecting money ===
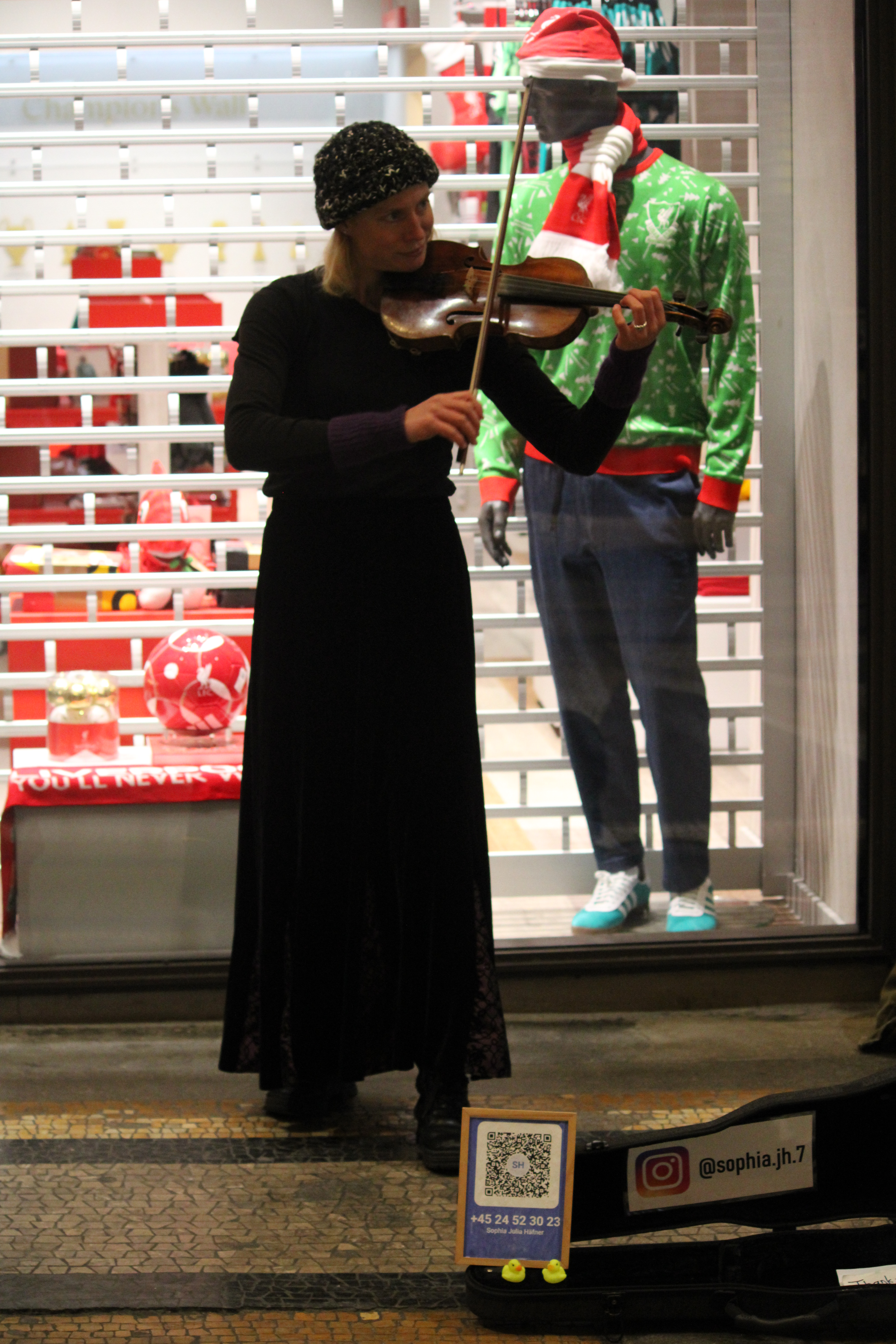
Violinist with a MobilePay QR code at Jorcks Passage in Copenhagen

Buskers collect donations and tips from the public in a variety of containers and by different methods depending on the type of busking they are performing. For walk-by acts, their open, empty instrument case or a special can, box, or hat is often used. For circle shows the performer will typically collect money at the end of the show, although some performers will also collect during the show, as some audience members do not stay for the entire performance.

Sometimes a performer will employ a bottler, hat man, or pitch man to collect money from the audience and encourage them to contribute, sometimes by cajoling them in a humorous fashion. The term bottler is a British term that originated from the use of the top half of a bottle to collect money. The bottle had a leather flap inserted in the bottleneck and a leather pouch attached. This design allowed coins to be put in the bottle but did not allow them to be removed easily without the coins jingling against the glass. The first use of such contrivances was recorded by the famous Punch and Judy troupe of puppeteers in early Victorian times.

The increasing use of cashless payments in the 21st century, and the corresponding lessening of the amount of cash typically carried, has affected buskers, some of whom have begun using electronic payment systems including contactless payment terminals and web or app based payment systems (sometimes reachable by QR code). This trend accelerated after COVID-19 lockdowns, but predates this.

=== Pitches ===
Toss juggling street performance in Denmark

The place where a performance occurs is called a "pitch". A good pitch can be the key to success as a busker. An act that might make money at one place and time may not work at all in another setting. Popular pitches tend to be public places with large volumes of pedestrian traffic, high visibility, low background noise and as few elements of interference as possible. Good locations may include tourist spots, popular parks, entertainment districts including many restaurants, cafés, bars and pubs and theaters, subways and bus stops, outside the entrances to large concerts and sporting events, almost any plaza or town square as well as zócalos in Latin America and piazzas in other regions. Other places include shopping malls, strip malls, and outside supermarkets, although permission is usually required from management for these.

In her book, Underground Harmonies: Music and Politics in the Subways of New York, Susie J. Tanenbaum examined how the adage "Music hath charms to soothe the savage beast" plays out in regards to busking. Her sociological studies showed that in areas where buskers regularly perform, crime rates tended to go down, and that those with higher education attainment tended to have a more positive view of buskers than did those of lesser educational attainment. Some cities encourage busking in particular areas, giving preference to city government-approved buskers and even publishing schedules of performances.

Many cities in the United States have particular areas known to be popular spots for buskers. Performers are found at many locations like Mallory Square in Key West, in New Orleans, in New York around Central Park, Washington Square, and the subway systems, in San Francisco, in Washington, D.C. around the transit centers, in Los Angeles around Venice Beach, the Santa Monica Third Street Promenade, and the Hollywood area, in Chicago on Maxwell Street, in the Delmar Loop district of St. Louis, and many other locations throughout the US. Busking is still quite common in Scotland, Ireland (Grafton Street, Dublin), and England with musicians and other street performers of varying talent levels.

== Legislation ==
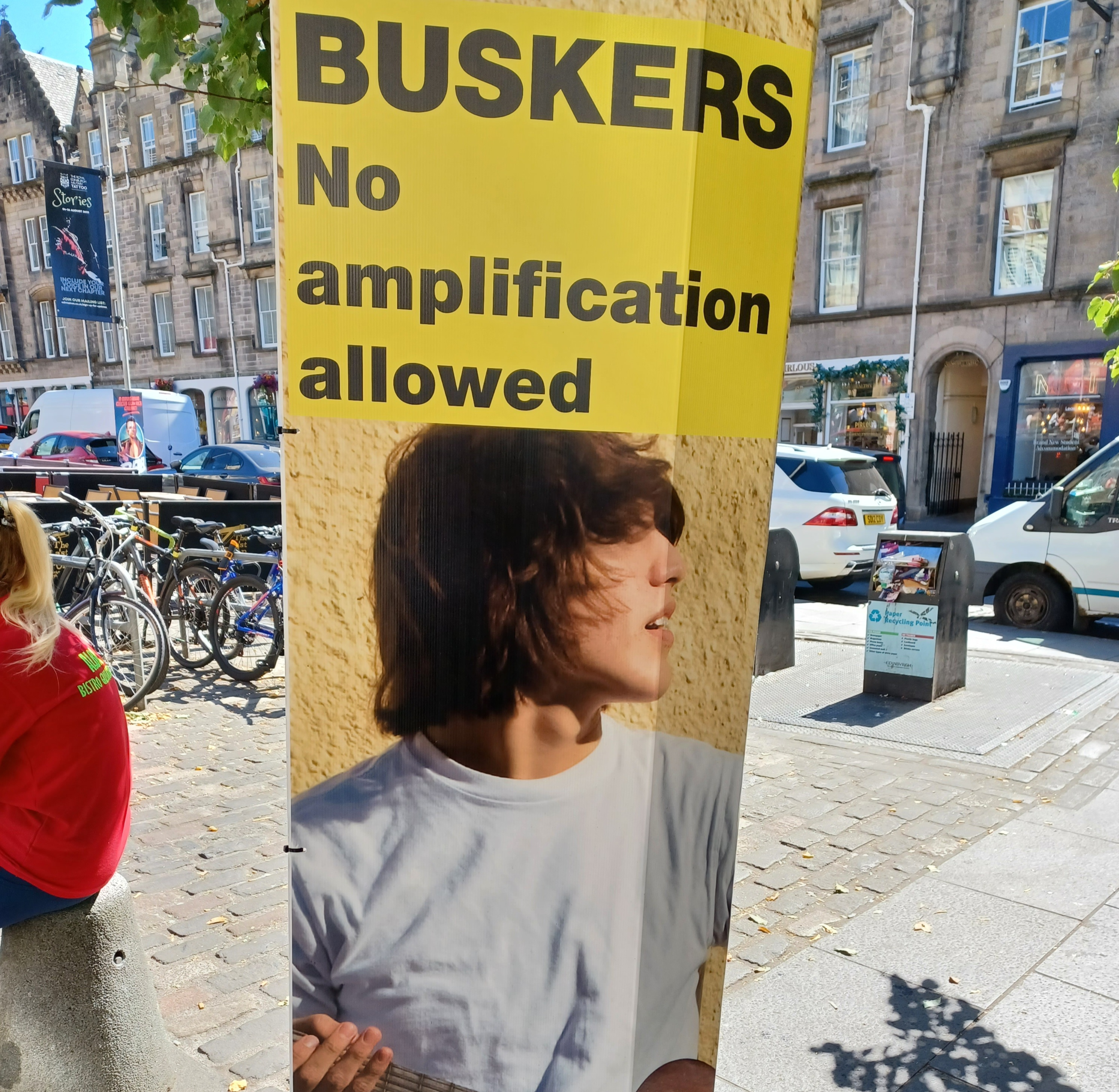
A sign in a tourist area of Edinburgh, Scotland, advises buskers that guitar amplifiers and PA speakers are not allowed.

The first recorded instances of laws affecting buskers were in ancient Rome in 462 BC. The Law of the Twelve Tables made it a crime to sing about or make parodies of the government or its officials in public places; the penalty was death. Louis the Pious "excluded histriones and scurrae, which included all entertainers without noble protection, from the privilege of justice". In 1530 Henry VIII ordered the licensing of minstrels and players, fortune-tellers, pardoners and fencers, as well as beggars who could not work. If they did not obey they could be whipped on two consecutive days.

In the United States under constitutional law and most European common law, the protection of artistic free speech extends to busking. In the U.S. and many countries, the designated places for free speech behavior are the public parks, streets, sidewalks, thoroughfares and town squares or plazas. Under certain circumstances even private property may be open to buskers, particularly if it is open to the general public and busking does not interfere with its function and management allows it or other forms of free speech behaviors or has a history of doing so.

While there is no universal code of conduct for buskers, there are common law practices that buskers must conform to. Most jurisdictions have corresponding statutory laws. In the UK busking regulation is not universal with most laws (if there are any) being governed by local councils. Some towns in the British Isles limit the licenses issued to bagpipers because of the volume and difficulty of the instrument. In Great Britain, schemes that license buskers may also require performers to pass an audition before being granted a pitch; for example, Transport for London's licensed busking scheme on the London Underground selects performers through panel auditions. Oxford City Council have decided to enact a public spaces protection order. Some venues that do not regulate busking may still ask performers to abide by voluntary rules. Some places require a special permit to use electronically amplified sound and may have limits on the volume of sound produced. It is common law that buskers or others should not impede pedestrian traffic flow, block or otherwise obstruct entrances or exits, or do things that endanger the public. It is common law that any disturbing or noisy behaviors may not be conducted after certain hours in the night. These curfew limitations vary from jurisdiction to jurisdiction. It is common law that "performing blue" (i.e. using material that is sexually explicit or any vulgar or obscene remarks or gestures) is generally prohibited unless performing for an adults-only environment such as in a bar or pub.

In London, busking is prohibited in the entire area of the City of London. The London Underground provides busking permits for up to 39 pitches across 25 central London stations. Most London boroughs do not license busking, but they have optional powers, under the London Local Authorities Act 2000, if there is sufficient reason to do so. Where these powers have not been adopted, councils can rely on other legislation including the Environmental Protection Act 1990 to deal with noise nuisance from buskers and the Highways Act 1980 to deal with obstructions. Camden Council is currently looking into further options to control the problem of nuisance buskers and the playing of amplified music to the detriment of local residents and businesses. The Westminster City Council banned busking in Leicester Square, previously a popular location, following a 2025 court ruling that busking was a "nuisance" and their repetitive performances were "psychological torture".

Buskers may find themselves targeted by thieves due to the very open and public nature of their craft. Buskers may have their earnings, instruments or props stolen. One particular technique that thieves use against buskers is to pretend to make a donation while actually taking money out instead, a practice known as "dipping" or "skimming". George Burns described his days as a youthful busker this way:

Sometimes the customers threw something in the hats. Sometimes they took something out of the hats. Sometimes they took the hats.

== Notable performers ==
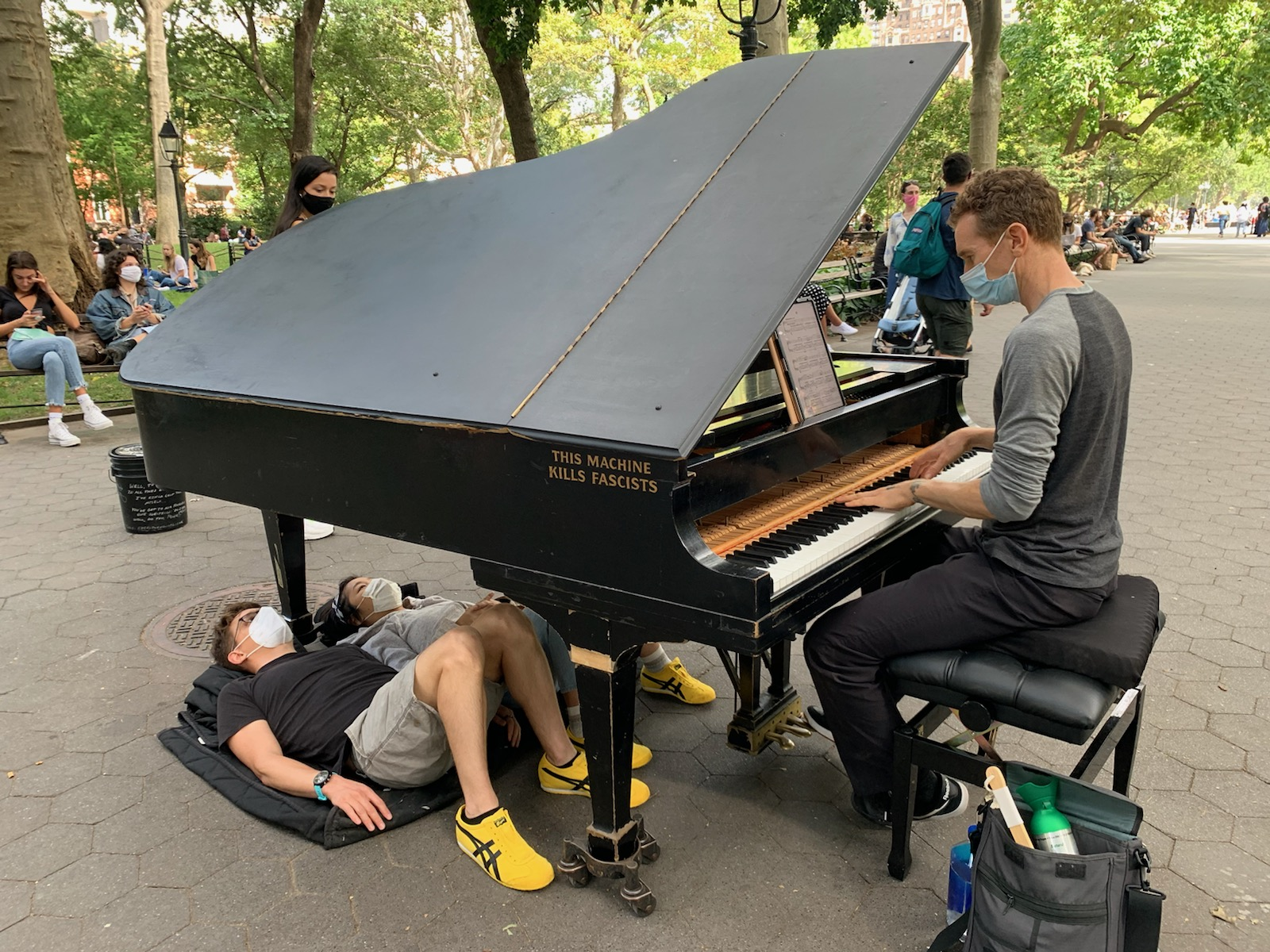
Colin Huggins playing a grand piano in Washington Square Park, New York City

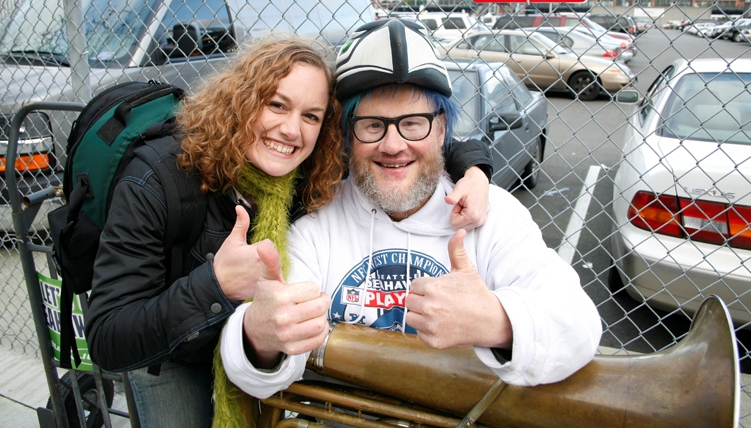
Ed "Tuba Man" McMichael (right) in 2006

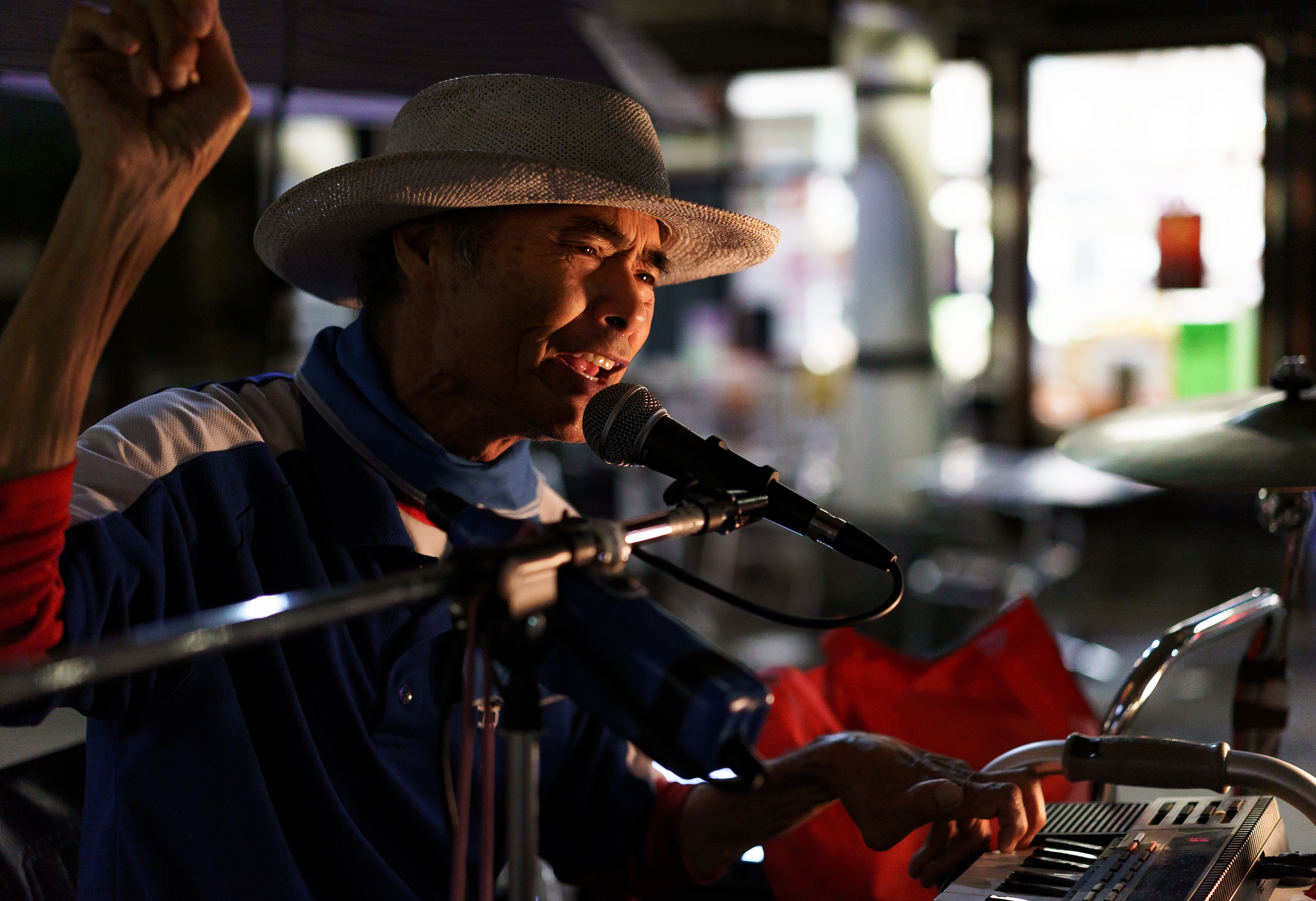
Arthur Nakane, a street performer and former one-man band who performs regularly in the Little Tokyo community of Los Angeles

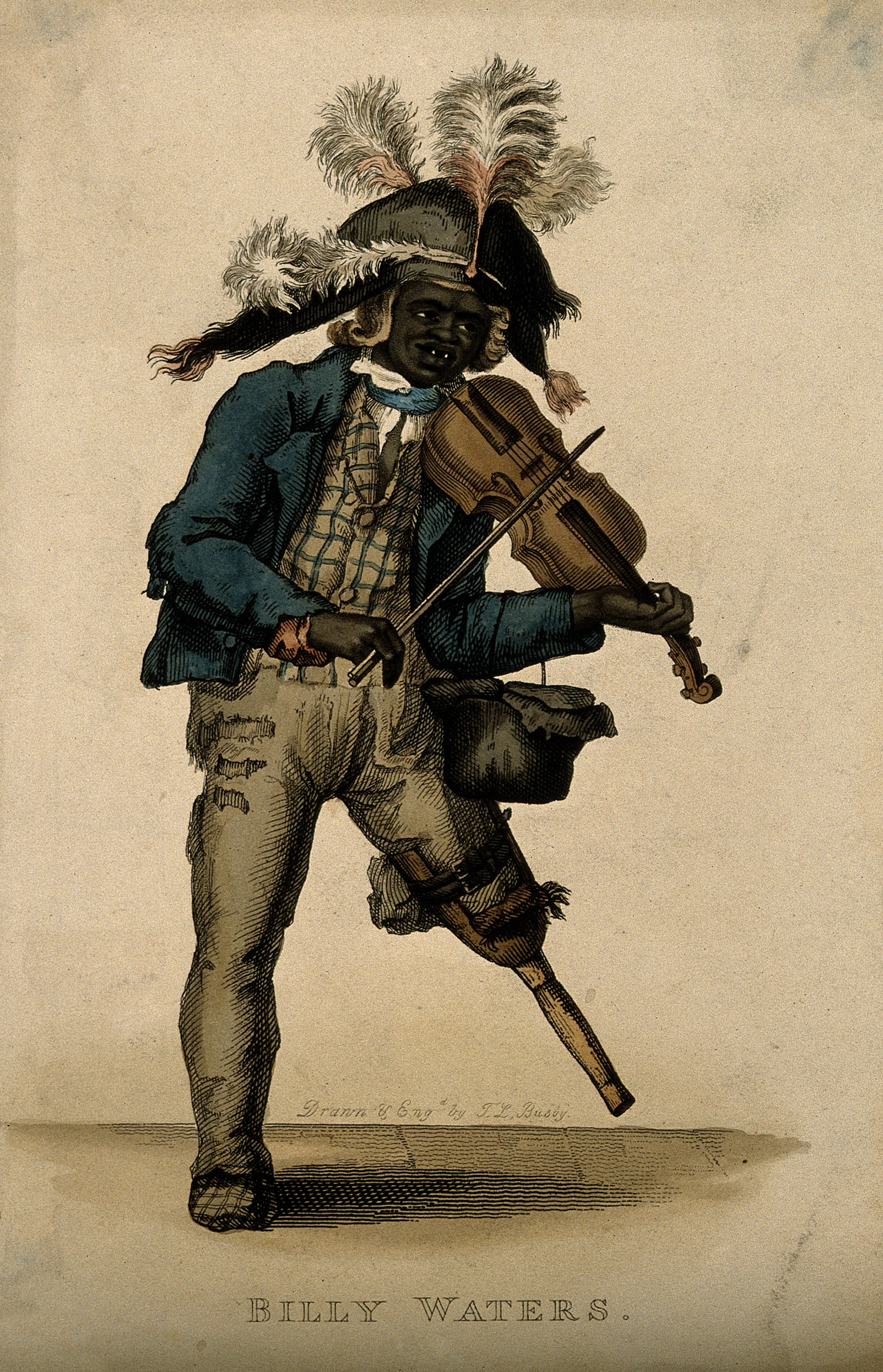
Billy Waters, a London busker from the 19th century

- 5 Seconds of Summer, Australian pop rock band. Prior to achieving international fame, the band busked in Rouse Hill and other parts of Sydney.
- Abby the Spoon Lady is a professional spoon player, street performer, and busking advocate who lives in Asheville, North Carolina.
- Josephine Baker started street dancing to make money and was recruited for the St. Louis Chorus vaudeville show at the age of 15, which started her dancing career.
- Joshua Bell, a noted classical violinist, posed as a busker in the L'Enfant Plaza Metro station in Washington, D.C. at rush hour in 2007, as part of a feature in The Washington Post. In the 45 minutes that Bell played, only seven people out of over a thousand who passed by stopped to watch, and he took in just over $32. Gene Weingarten later won a Pulitzer Prize for the story.
- Catfish the Bottleman a well-known busker from Sydney, Australia, so inspired Van McCann of Catfish and the Bottlemen that he named his band after him. He watched him perform as a child and said that it was his first memory of music.
- Tracy Chapman began her career busking in Harvard Square in Cambridge, Massachusetts.
- Mike Doughty, former singer for Soul Coughing, released Busking, which contains 12 tracks from a 2007 busking performance in the 14th Street subway station in New York City.
- Newton Faulkner has been known to busk and video footage of him busking has been made available on YouTube, including a full acoustic cover of Queen's "Bohemian Rhapsody".
- Benjamin Franklin, the American inventor and statesman, was a street performer. He composed songs, poetry and prose about current events and went out in public and performed them. He would then sell printed copies of them to the public. He was dissuaded from busking by his father who convinced him it was not worth the stigmas that some people attach to it. It was this experience that helped form his beliefs in free speech, which he wrote about in his journals.
- G4, the British popera quartet, performed as buskers across London during their college days.
- Mark Goffeney, aka 'Big Toe', known for playing guitar despite being born without arms.
- Shannon Hoon, former singer for Blind Melon, was known to busk all over the U.S.
- Colin Huggins, a classical pianist who performs on a Steinway grand piano in Washington Square Park and other parks in Greenwich Village, New York City.
- Henry Johnson (acrobat) (1806–1910), circus acrobat and street entertainer using acrobatics, tightrope-walking etc.
- Keytar Bear, a busker in Boston, Massachusetts, who wears a bear suit and plays a keytar.
- Guy Laliberté was a street performer when he founded the Cirque du Soleil theatrical company in 1984.
- Loreena McKennitt, developing a passion for Celtic music, learned to play the Celtic harp and began busking at various places, including St. Lawrence Market in Toronto in order to earn money to record her first album.
- Edward McMichael was a celebrated street musician known as Seattle's "Tuba Man", who busked outside the city's various sports and performing arts venues. In 2008, he was killed by attackers who were attempting to rob him.
- Sterling Magee and Adam Gussow, AKA Satan and Adam, were busking on 125th Street in Harlem, New York City, in the summer of 1987 when the members of U2, accompanied by a film crew, paused to watch the blues duo. The scene later appeared in the film Rattle and Hum.
- George Michael used to busk near the London Underground, performing songs such as '39 by Queen.
- Peter Mulvey, the singer-songwriter, recorded an entire album down in the Boston subway, where he was a regular busker. In most cases, songs were recorded in one or two takes.
- Kristyna Myles won the BBC Radio 5 Live Busker of the Year competition in 2005 and has gone on to sign a recording contract with Decca. Her debut album is due for release in September 2012.
- Paul Oscher, a famous Blues musician and harp player, has busked as "Brooklyn Slim" on the Venice Boardwalk to try out new material. Oscher, a two-time W.C Handy Award winner, was the harp player for Muddy Waters and his band in the late 1960s and early 1970s. He currently performs at blues festivals in the U.S. and internationally.
- Amanda Palmer, singer-songwriter, internet personality and founder of The Dresden Dolls started out performing as a living statue around the world.
- Don Partridge, an English singer and songwriter, known as the "king of the buskers". Achieved unexpected commercial success in the UK and Europe in the late 1960s with the songs "Rosie", "Blue Eyes" and "Breakfast On Pluto".
- Natalia Paruz, aka 'Saw Lady', who can be seen in movies such as Dummy and heard on many movie soundtracks, has been playing the musical saw in the New York City subway since 1994.
- Harry Perry, aka the 'Kama Kosmic Krusader of Venice Beach,' is an American electronic guitarist who has been continuously busking on the boardwalk of Venice Beach, CA since the early 1970's.
- Surf/ska band the Red Elvises boosted their career by playing outside in Santa Monica, California, on the Third Street Promenade. Their manic performances attracted such large crowds that city officials asked them to stop.
- Alice Tan Ridley, busked in New York City subway stations for 30 years; semi-finalist in America's Got Talent, mother of Gabourey Sidibe
- Rodrigo y Gabriela, began their career by busking in Dublin, Ireland.
- Peg Leg Sam, a famous harmonica player from South Carolina, preferred busking over all other forms/venues. His most requested song was "John Henry".
- Daniel Seavey performed in the streets of Portland, Oregon, and subsequently joined boy band Why Don't We.
- Ketch Secor, whose group Old Crow Medicine Show started with busking and remains committed to it, has said: "People ... have short attention spans. ... So if you can get 'em to stop ... if you can get 'em to listen with a song, then you've got yourself a keeper."
- The Piccadilly Rats, street performance group from Manchester, England
- Allie Sherlock sings on Grafton Street, Dublin
- Tuba Skinny, street band in New Orleans
- Rod Stewart began hanging around folk singer Wizz Jones and busking, at Leicester Square and other London spots in 1962. On several trips over the next 18 months, Jones and Stewart took their act to Brighton and then to Paris, sleeping under bridges over the river Seine, and then finally to Barcelona. Finally this resulted in Stewart being rounded up and deported from Spain for vagrancy during 1963.
- Tash Sultana, an Australian singer-songwriter and multi-instrumentalist who busked on the streets of Melbourne.
- SungBeats, a beatbox loop artist won the Amateur Night at the Apollo competition in 2014.
- Damo Suzuki, the singer of the band Can, was found by band members Czukay and Liebezeit busking outside a Munich café and was asked to perform with the band that same night.
- Tones and I, an Australian indie-pop singer-songwriter and musician.
- KT Tunstall, a popular Scottish singer, has been recorded busking in Glasgow.
- Nik Turner, former saxophonist with Hawkwind and Inner City Unit, continues to busk regularly in the streets of his adopted hometown Cardigan.
- T. Rex members Marc Bolan and Steve Peregrin Took first performed as an acoustic guitar/bongos duo when they went busking together in Hyde Park in summer 1967 after their electric equipment had been confiscated by Track Records and their two bandmates had both left. In this acoustic format, the duo would go on to release three albums.
- Unipiper, a performer in Portland, Oregon, is known for playing the bagpipes on a unicycle.
- Violent Femmes were discovered by James Honeyman-Scott (of The Pretenders) on 23 August 1981, when the band was busking on a street corner in front of the Oriental Theatre, the Milwaukee venue that The Pretenders would be playing later that night. Chrissie Hynde invited them to play a brief acoustic set after the opening act.
- Yamunabai Waikar, decorated Indian folk–Lavani–Tamasha artist busked with her mother as a child.
- Billy Waters, a one-legged busker who rose to prominence in London during the nineteenth century.
- Hayley Westenra at one time busked on the streets of Christchurch, New Zealand.

== Gallery ==
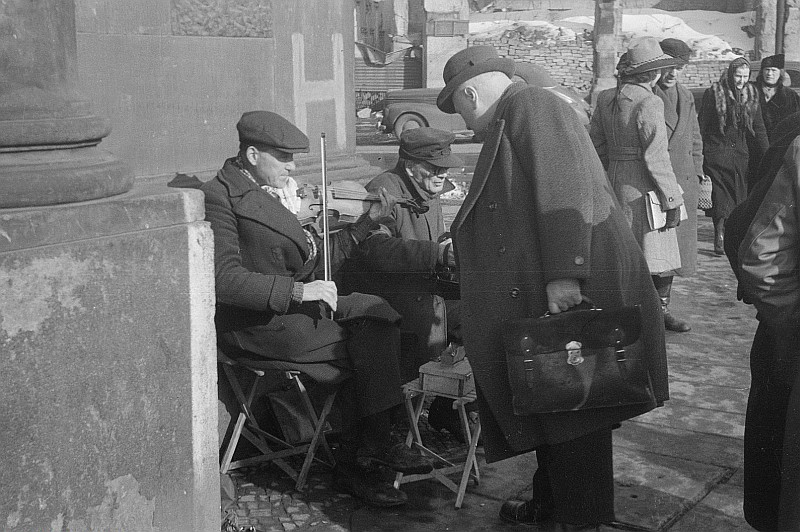
German street performers play for pedestrians in 1948

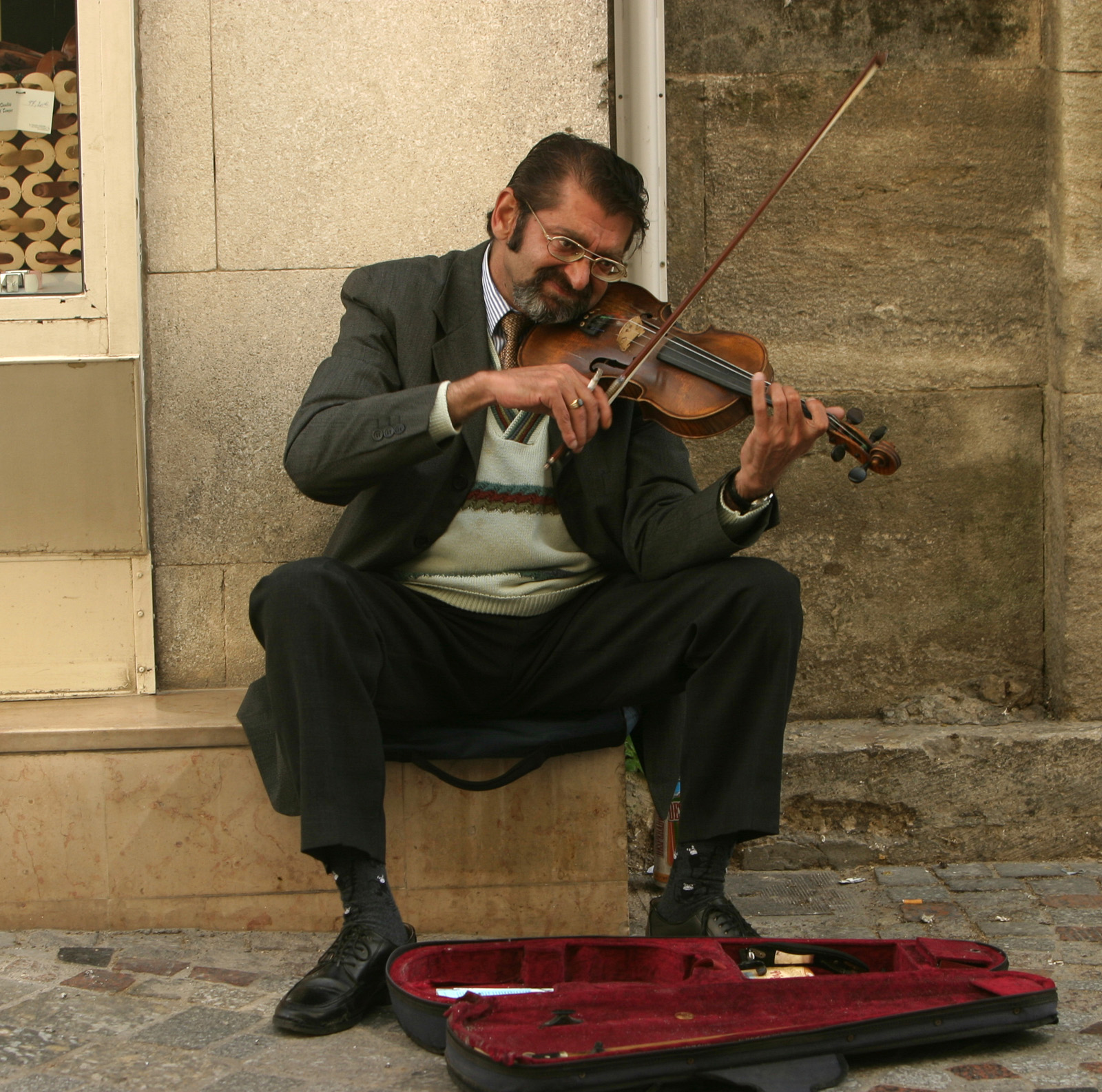
Classical fiddler in Arles, France

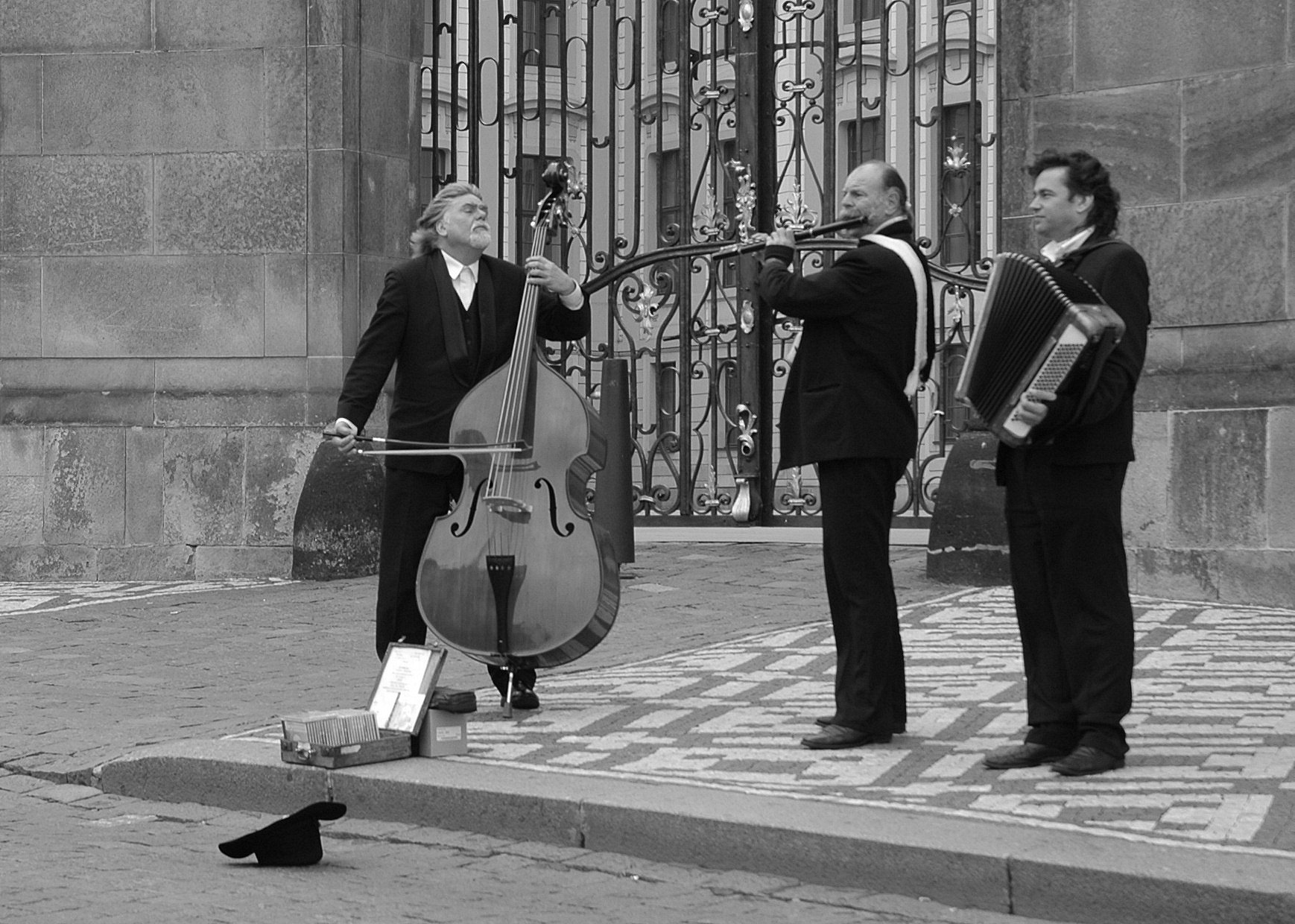
A street performance trio on their pitch outside Prague Castle

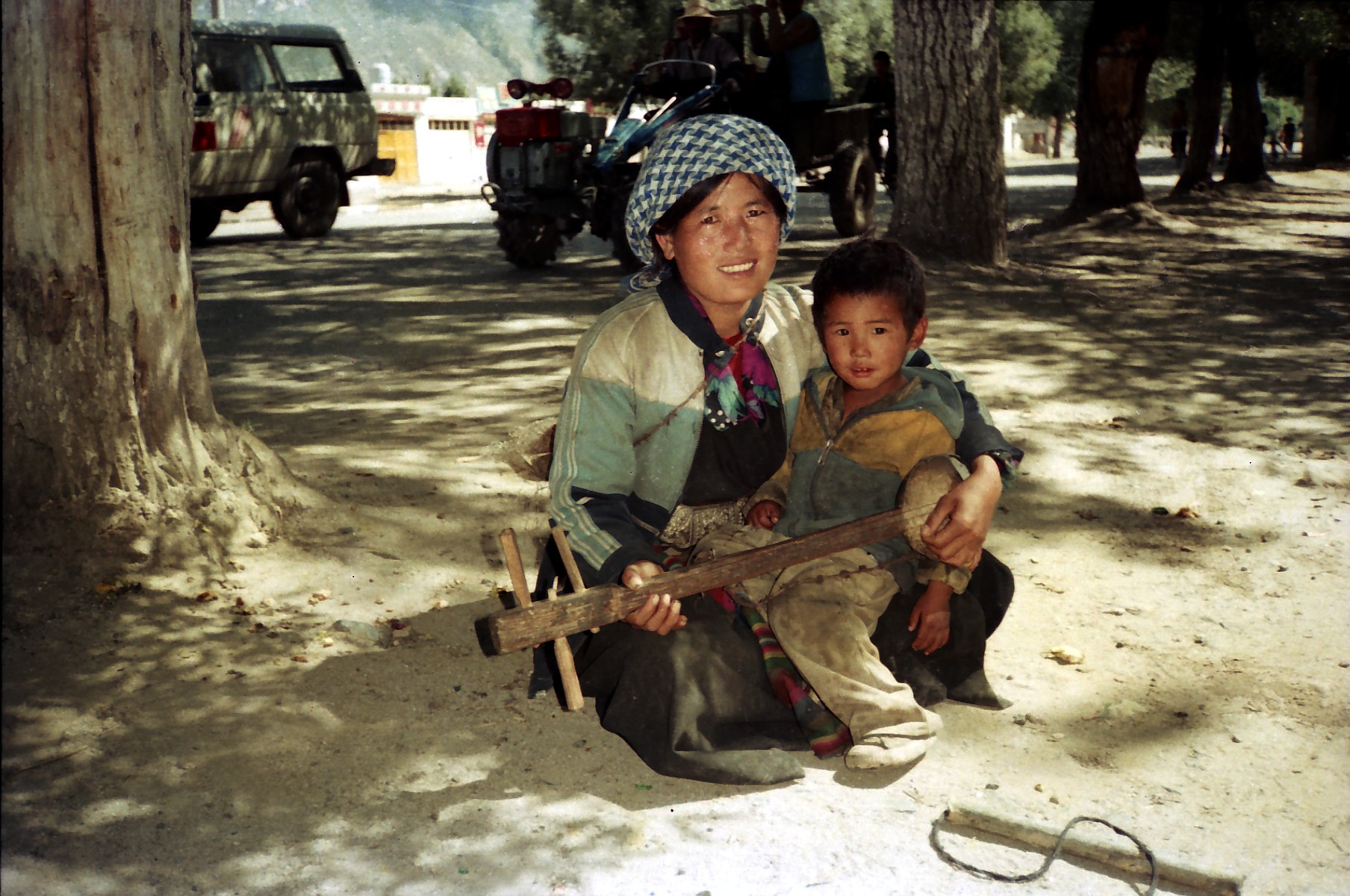
Mother and son busking in Lhasa, Tibet, 1993

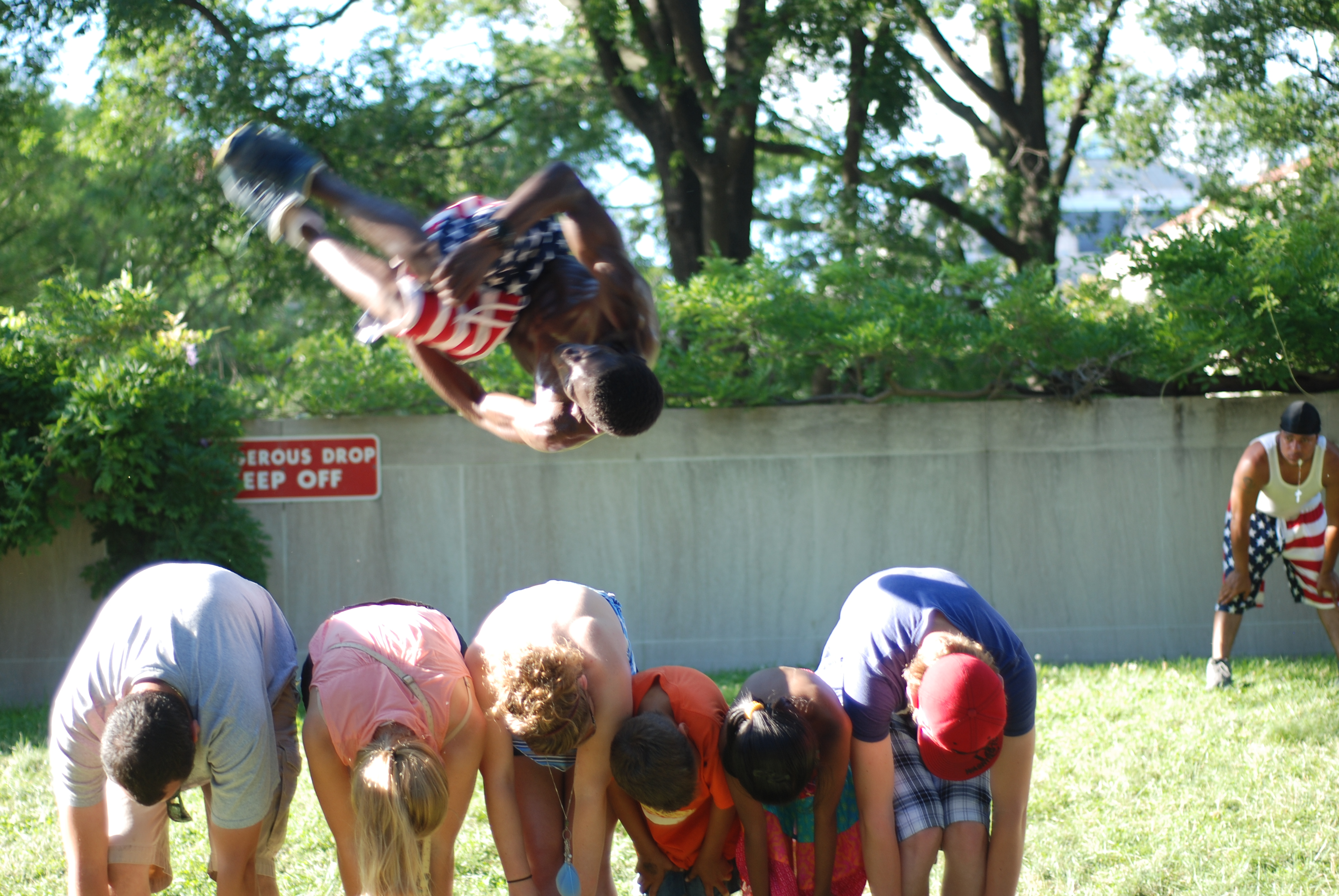
Acrobat jumping over volunteers in Washington, D.C.

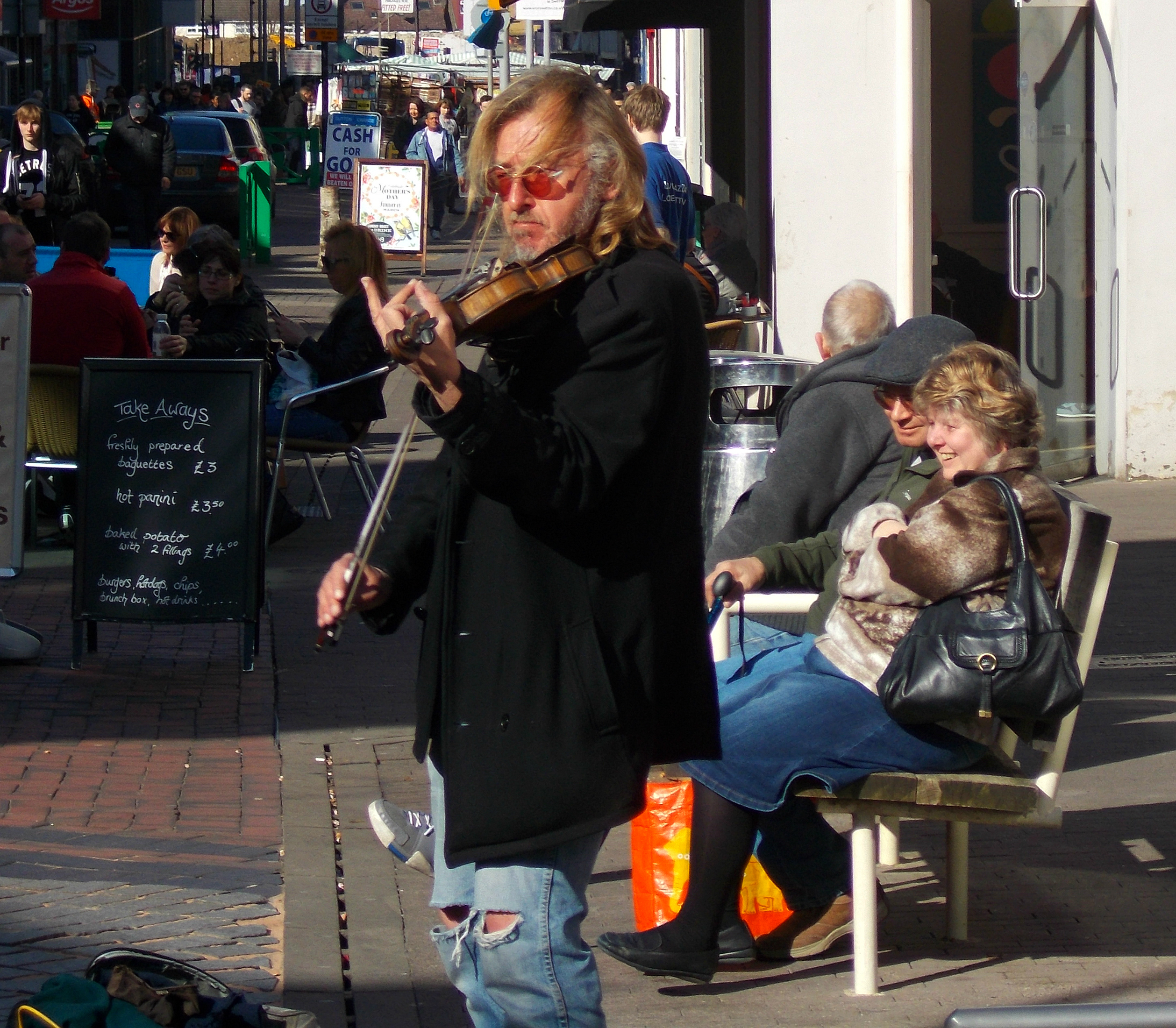
Violinist in Sutton High Street, Sutton, London

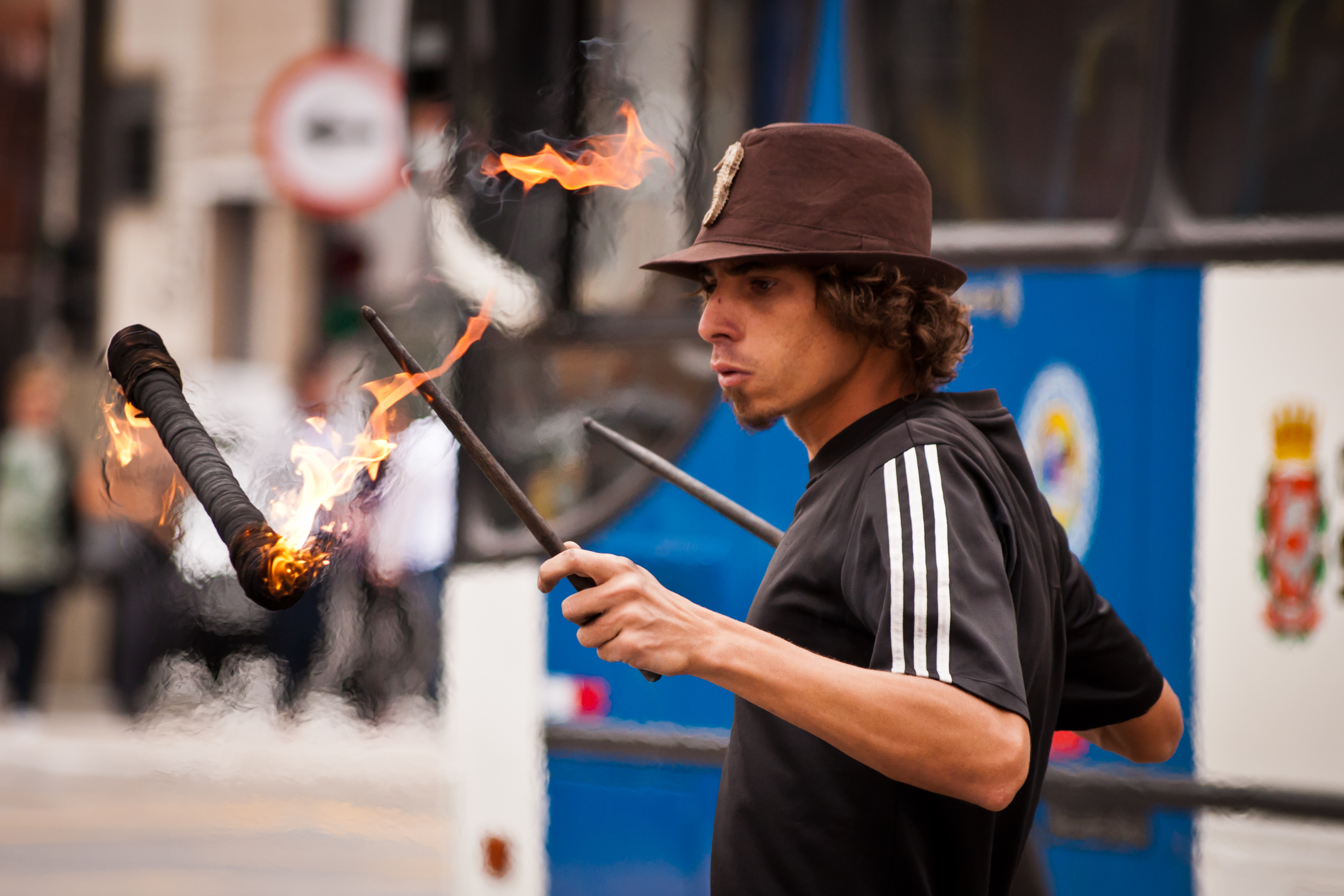
Street performer using a fire devilstick in São Paulo, Brazil

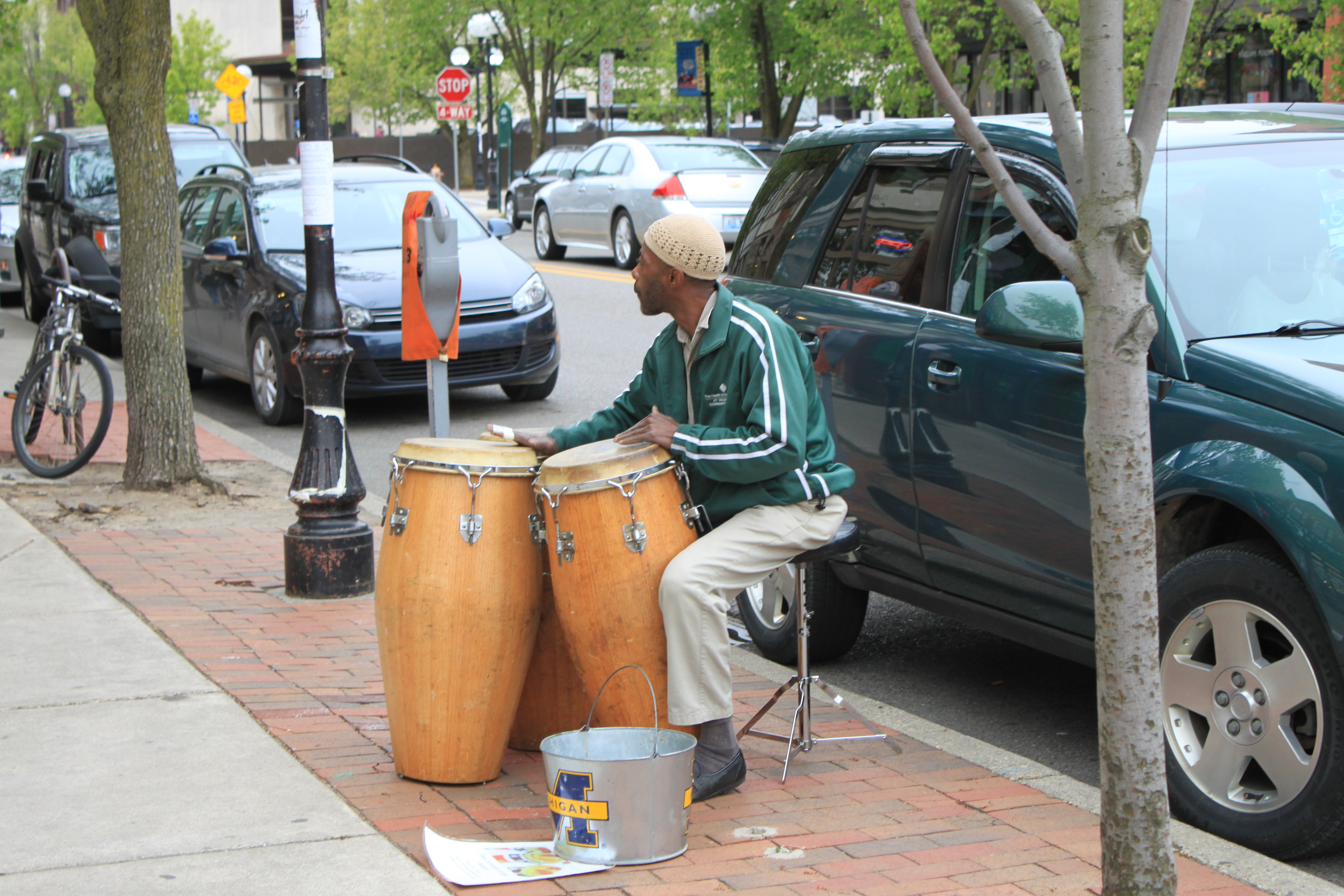
Street musician playing congas, Ann Arbor, Michigan

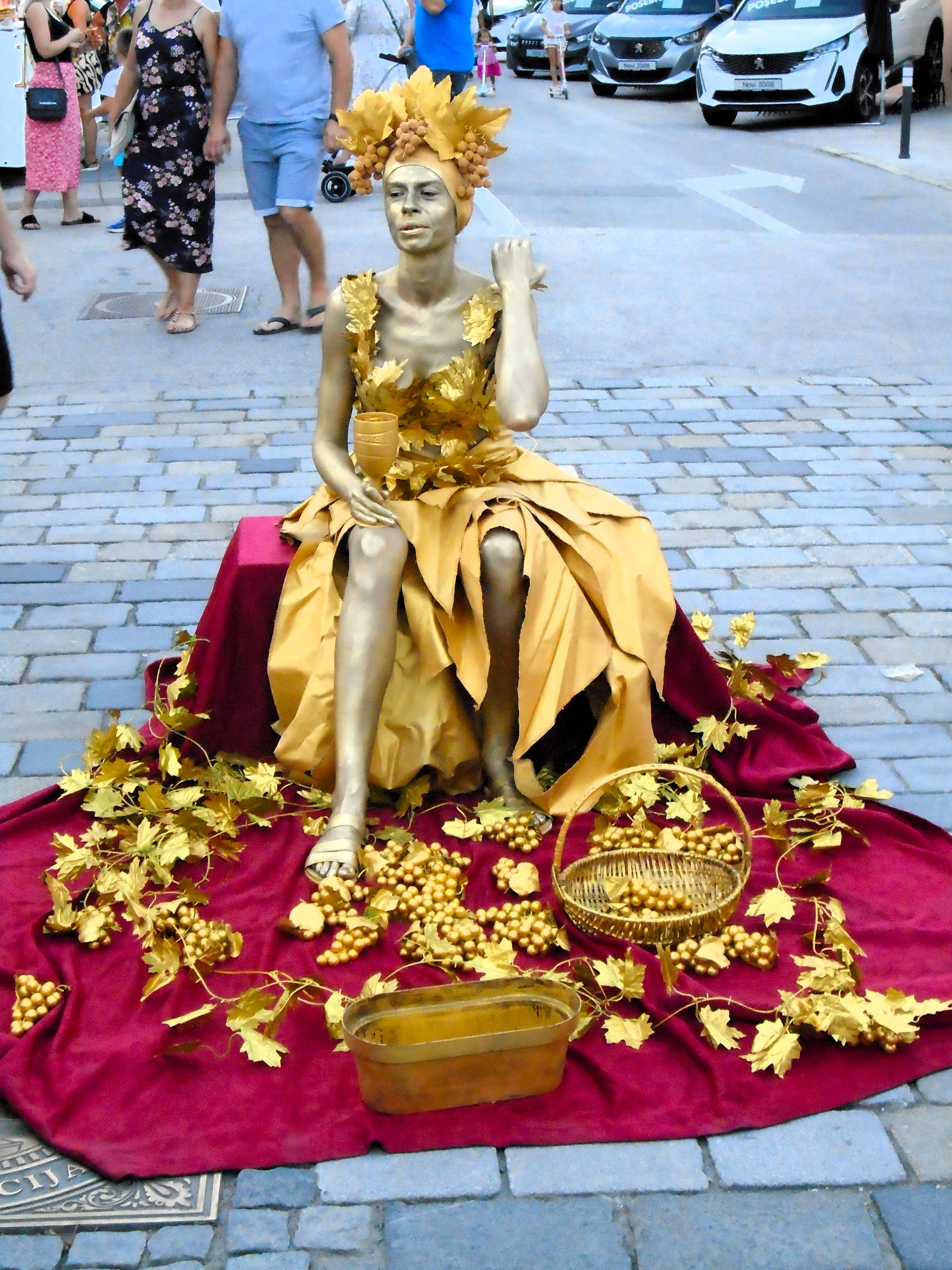
Street performer at Špancirfest, Croatia

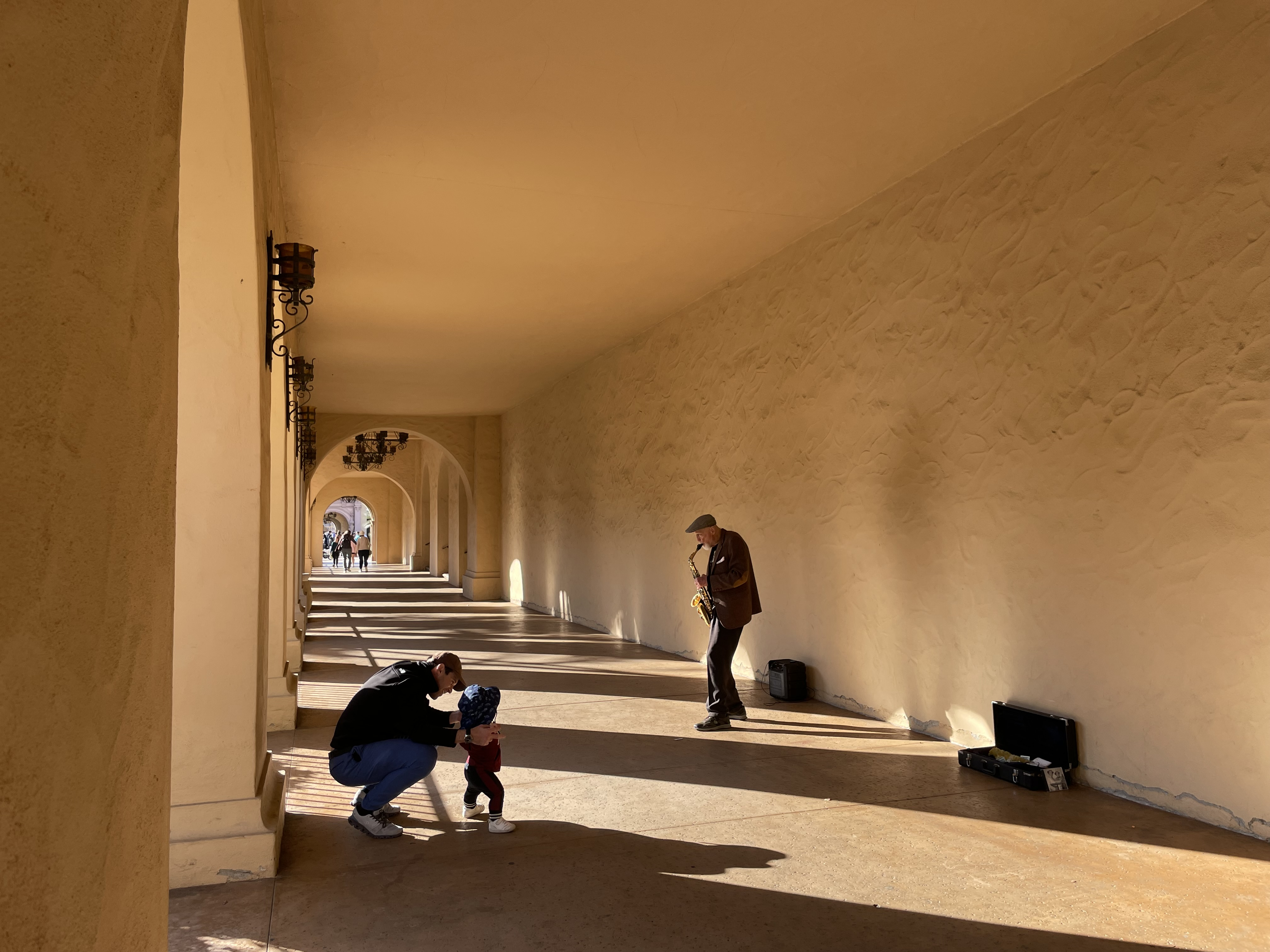
Saxophonist in Balboa Park, San Diego

== See also ==
- Bhand – Indian sub-continent traditional entertainers
- Busking Day – Organized events for street performers
- Category:Busking venues
- List of circus skills
- Music Under New York – Music program in New York City's transit system
- Skomorokh – Medieval East Slavic performers
- Street artist – Person who makes art in public places
- Street painting – Pavement, street, or sidewalk art
- Street theatre – Form of theatrical performance
