= Arthur Nakane =

Japanese musician (born 1937)

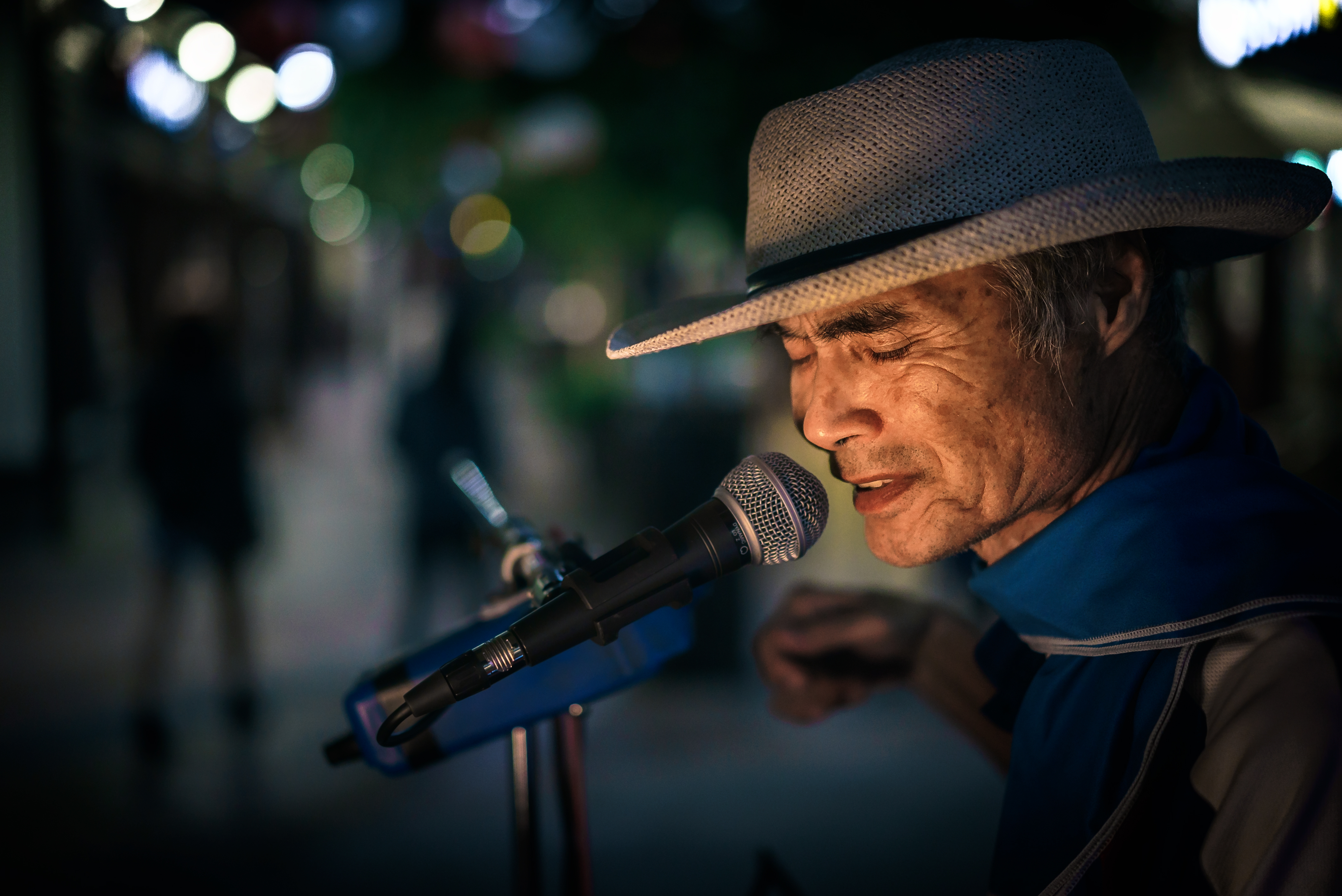
Those who meet Arthur Nakane are welcomed by a passion for music

Arthur Asao Nakane (born February 19, 1937, in Japan) is a Los Angeles-based musician, songwriter, and screenwriter best known for being the subject of the 2000 documentary film Secret Asian Man and also being a star on the 2010 TV show America's Got Talent.

He is a modern-age one-man band with traditional (all live) style, utilizing electronic equipment, but without using any programmed, prerecorded or computer-generated music.

Nakane's trademark is his playing style which has impressed many well-known people including Jack Black, Roseanne Barr and Andrae Crouch.

He sings over 1,000 songs of various genres including pop, rock, oldies (including 50 songs by Elvis and 40 by the Beatles), standard, traditional, folk, country/western, Latin, Hawaiian and Japanese. He sings in English, Japanese and Spanish. In addition, he is also known for his famous song," Anderson is the Best," where he made top 85 on America's Got Talent.

He plays the electric guitar, a harmonica around his neck and an echo-miked kazoo that imitates the sound of saxophone. (He calls it "saxophony.") He uses three keyboards, which he plays with a stick attached to the neck of his guitar. He plays his handmade 25-key bass pedal board with his two feet. While playing the bass, he operates a tape recorder with his right foot, wearing a red sock to draw attention, to record his singing, then plays back to harmonize. He often utters some audience's names, usually with a high pitched voice, in order to demonstrate that it is on-the-spot recording. At times he also shakes a spring-loaded tambourine while strumming his guitar, and also maracas if needed for some Latin numbers. He strikes two cymbals with a drumstick attached at the end of his guitar to accentuate the set beat of a drum machine, which is the only thing that is automatic. He claims he can do seven of the above at one time if necessary.

He often performs as a street performer at the Santa Monica Pier and Little Tokyo (the Japanese Village Plaza) in Los Angeles, California.

He claims that he never wanted to become a professional musician: "I am an artist who happens to play music." He was pushed into music business as he got married while going through college.

As his own family grew almost every year (six children in nine years), he needed to buy a newly invented drum machine in 1970, in order to compete with other musicians who might take his jobs away. He claims he was one of the first five Southern California musicians who ever bought drum machines.

Being embarrassed by the public calling him "one-man band", he decided to add another instrument or two so as not to fall short of their expectations. In 1972 he purchased an ARP synthesizer and customized it to play melody or bass with his feet. He also added harmonica to his repertoire. To his surprise people started to call him "one-man orchestra".

In 1976 his current style was set. Also that year he finally graduated from California State University at Los Angeles and became a high school teacher. But his dismal salary as a math and shop teacher made him continue performing on weekends to support his wife Rosemarie and six children.

In 1980 he was scouted by director/producer Francis Coppola for the movie One from the Heart although his segment, singing "America the Beautiful," was not used because of some script changes. (A still photo of his performance appears in the bonus feature of the film's DVD.)

He performed at the Los Angeles Street Scene Festival from 1984 until the event was abruptly terminated after 1987 because of a gang fight.

In 1995 he started to perform on the Third Street Promenade in Santa Monica for wider exposure and was scouted to appear for the first time on national TV, "George (Hamilton) & Alana (Stuart)".

He opened for the Everclear, who also saw him perform on the Promenade, when the alternative rock group appeared at the Roxy in Hollywood. His popularity at this three-day concert led to his participation of the Everclear's national tour (26 major cities) in 1996, receiving rave reviews.

He appeared on the worldwide Spanish TV show "Sevcec" (Telemundo) in 1996.

In 2000, director Mike Sakamoto directed a short documentary film on Nakane, entitled "Secret Asian Man", which premiered at the Sundance Film Festival and along with the film his live performance received favorable reviews.

In 2010, Nakane auditioned for the popular TV show "America's Got Talent (season 5)" with his one-man band act. He passed the preliminary auditions, competing with estimated 100,000 participants (17,000 acts) and went to Las Vegas as one of the top 85 acts.

Since retiring from teaching in 1984, he has been serving as a professional Japanese translator as well.

Nakane has translated several dozens of popular Japanese songs into English.

He has also written dozens of inspirational stories from his experience as a one-man band, which he is planning to publish in near future.

In 2013 Nakane fell at home and suffered a serious injury. He currently is unable to walk or hold any of instruments. Struggling to return, he has performed as a vocalist, but his one-man band fell silent.

As of 2018, Nakane has been back at it, consistently playing a variety of instruments in Little Tokyo and elsewhere.

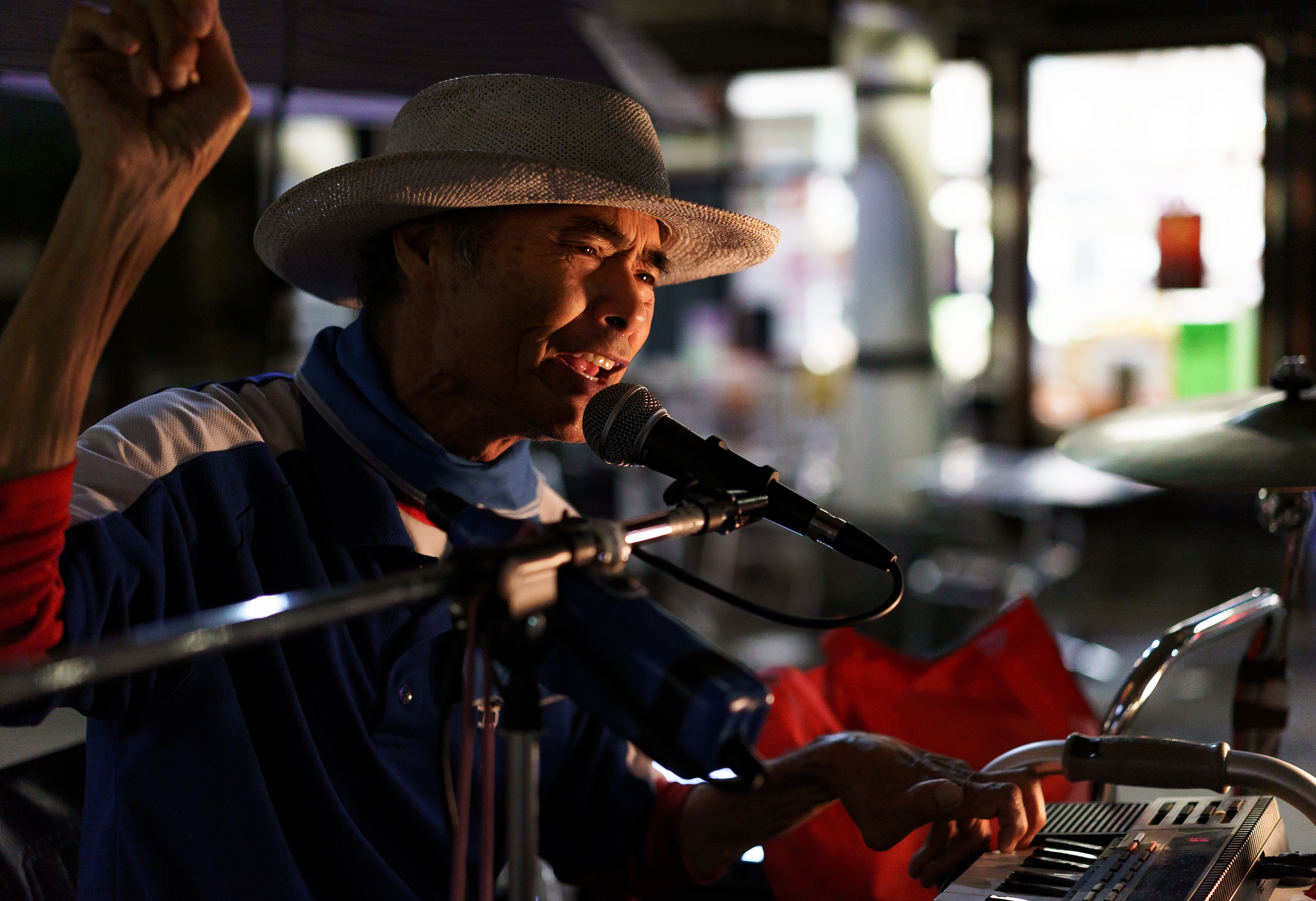
Arthur Nakane returns to Little Tokyo, Los Angeles.
