= Mustard tree =

Mustard tree is a common name for:

- Nicotiana glauca
- Salvadora persica, native to the Middle East, Africa, and India

== See also ==
- Parable of the Mustard Seed
