= Jill Bullitt =

American artist

- Born: Jill Hamilton Bullitt; August 21, 1951 (age 75); Seattle, Washington; United States
- Education: Stanford University; University of North Carolina at Chapel Hill
- Occupations: Artist; Academic; Political activist
- Spouse: David Rigsbee (divorced)
- Children: 1
- Parent(s): Charles Stimson Bullitt; Carolyn Kizer

Jill Hamilton Bullitt (born August 21, 1951) is an American artist, political activist, and academic.

== Early life and education ==
Bullitt was born on August 21, 1951, in Seattle, Washington. She is the daughter of the poet Carolyn Kizer and Charles Stimson Bullitt, an attorney. She is from a prominent Seattle family descending from Alexander Scott Bullitt. Her paternal grandmother, Dorothy Stimson Bullitt, was the founder of the King Broadcasting Company and the Bullitt Foundation.

Bullitt graduated from Stanford University in 1973 and received a master of fine arts degree from the University of North Carolina at Chapel Hill in 1999.

== Career ==
In 1978 Bullitt co-founded the Social Justice Fund, a foundation focusing on promoting solutions to social justice issues in Idaho, Montana, Oregon, Washington, and Wyoming.

From 1989 until 1990, Bullitt served as the executive director of Dieu Donné Papermill in New York City. In 1995 she was appointed as a scholar-in-residence at Hamilton College. While in graduate school at the University of North Carolina at Chapel Hill, she worked as a teaching fellow. Bullitt has been a visiting lecturer in art at Duke University and University of Washington. She also served as an assistant professor of art at the University of Mount Olive and a professor at the Savannah College of Art and Design.

Marquis Who's Who listed Bullitt as a notable artist and educator. In 1993 she was a recipient of the David R. Hunter Founder's Award by A Territory Resource Foundation. In 2003 she was a finalist for an award in painting from the American Academy of Arts and Letters.

Bullitt was president of the Friends of the International School of Painting, Drawing, and Sculpture in Monte Castello di Vibio, Italy from 1993 until 2001 and is a co-founder of the El Salvador Media Education Project. She has also served as the executive director of the Boca Lupo Fund, co-director of The Energy Project at the Corporation Data Exchange, and a co-founder and board director of the Central American Media Education Project. In 1996-97 she was a board director of the Threshold Foundation.

Bullitt is also a patron of the Museum of Northwest Art.

== Personal life ==
Bullitt was married to David Rigsbee, a poet and academic, for eighteen years before they divorced. They have one daughter, Makaiya.
