= Jean Enersen =

American journalist (born 1944)

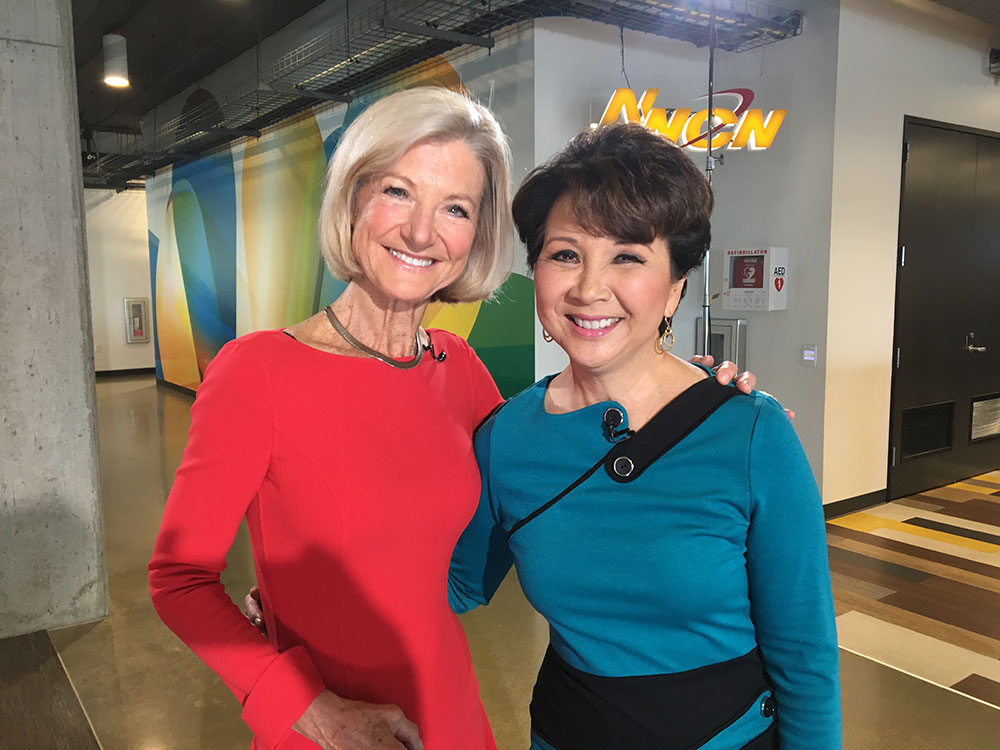
- KING-TV news anchors Jean Ensersen (left) and Lori Matsukawa in 2018
- Born: Jean Stanislaw; June 16, 1944 (age 82); San Mateo, California
- Education: Stanford University, 1966; M.A. 1967, 1969
- Occupation: Journalist
- Years active: 1968-2016
- Notable credit: KING-TV anchor
- Spouses: Dr. Bruce Carter; Paul Skinner; Dick Enersen
- Children: 2 daughters

Jean Stanislaw Enersen (born June 16, 1944) is an American journalist who worked for 48 years at KING-TV in Seattle. Filling the anchor chair at KING for 42 years, Enersen was the longest-standing local female anchor. She retired from full-time anchor duties at KING in the summer of 2014, and accepted a retirement buy-out by Tegna, formerly Gannett, in April 2016.

== Early life ==
Enersen was born in San Mateo, California, to Irving "Stan" and Evelyn Stanislaw, while her father was serving in the U.S. Navy.

Her family moved to the Seattle neighborhood of Magnolia when she was young and she attended Our Lady of Fatima School. She then studied at Mercer Island High School, where she participated in swimming and graduated in 1962. She attended Pomona College and transferred to Stanford University, earning a bachelor's degree in 1966.

== Career ==
Enersen started her television career as a reporter at KPIX-TV in San Francisco and had planned to earn a PhD at Stanford but lost her government-funded scholarship due to the Vietnam War.

She returned to Seattle in 1968 for a job in King Broadcasting Company's documentary-film production company King Screen Productions, but the subsidiary was plagued by financial issues. After a week on the job, the film division was shuttered and Enersen transitioned into the newsroom.

In the KING newsroom, Enersen was one of only two women and has since recounted experiences of sexism from male coworkers. She told The Seattle Times, "There was a photographer who wouldn't get out of the car to shoot. I'm new. He's twice my age. He only wanted to roll down his car window and shoot from the car. So I said, 'Don't you think we could get a better picture if you came out?'"

After four years in the newsroom, Enersen became the first female local news anchor in the country in 1972, though television news consulting firm McHugh and Hoffman had recommended promoting her to news anchor two years earlier. At the time, broadcast executives were unsure how women would be received by audiences as news anchors, including KING-TV owner Dorothy Bullitt, the first woman to own a television station. Enersen appeared as KING's main anchor for the first time on August 30, 1971.

Many more women – who had previously been limited to roles as clerical workers, "weather girls," and occasionally field reporters – filled local anchor chairs after Enersen's trailblazing, including Judy Woodruff in Atlanta and Jane Pauley in Indianapolis in the early 1970s.

By 1973 Enersen was considered Seattle's top newscaster, according to market research at the time. She became known as “The Franchise” in the local television market.

Enersen was the first local TV journalist to report from China in 1979 after the U.S. established diplomatic relations. In 1988, she was the first journalist to report from the USSR, appearing for both KING-TV and a Soviet morning show.

She interviewed many notable figures, including Oprah Winfrey, Bill Gates, Ken Behring, Warren Buffett, and Ronald Reagan.

Though Enersen served as a temporary host for NBC's Today Show in 1986, she told The Seattle Times she decided to stay in Seattle and forego a position at a national network or larger local market after her daughters were born.

Enersen retired from the anchor chair in 2014, just before her 70th birthday. She remained on staff at KING-TV, primarily reporting for the health news series HealthLink, until fully retiring in 2016.

== Philanthropy ==
Outside of the newsroom, Enersen was known for advocating for charitable organizations, including with the Susan G. Komen Breast Cancer Foundation and Northwest AIDS Walk. She also serves as the Representative Director for UW Medicine on the University of Washington Foundation Board.

== Pop culture ==
In the 2021 Netflix series Firefly Lane, Enersen was the career inspiration for fictional journalist Tully Hart, played by Katherine Heigl. The series was set in Seattle and based on a book of the same name written by a local author. In 2015, Enersen delivered a TED Talk in Kirkland, Washington titled "We're all in this together" about her career, the workplace sexism she experienced, healthy living, and the power of community.

== Personal life ==
Enersen married Dr. Bruce Carter, president and CEO of ZymoGenetics, in 1997. Her previous marriages were to cinematographer Dick Enersen and businessman Paul Skinner, the father of her two daughters.
