= Steven Clifford (author) =

American author

- Born: Steven A. Clifford
- Education: Columbia University (BA); Harvard Business School (MBA)
- Occupation: Author

Steven A. Clifford is an American author and former businessman and government official. He was the Special Deputy Comptroller of New York City and was CEO of King Broadcasting Company and National Mobile Television. He is most famous for his 2017 book, The CEO Pay Machine.

== Biography ==
Clifford received his B.A. from Columbia University in 1964 and his M.B.A. from Harvard Business School in 1968. During the New York City financial crisis of the 1970s, he was a special deputy comptroller of New York City, where he was credited for creating the city's integrated financial management system (IFMS) between 1975 and 1977.

From 1987 to 1992, Clifford was CEO of King Broadcasting Company and then National Mobile Television from 1992 to his retirement in 2000.

In 2017, Clifford published The CEO Pay Machine: How It Trashes America and How to Stop It, a book that reveals how corporations craft their compensation packages and criticizes what Clifford calls "outrageous" pay of corporate chief executives, arguing that excessive pay would hurt American businesses and shareholders. In 2019, he delivered a testimony in the United States House Committee on Financial Services.

During the COVID-19 pandemic, Clifford's criticism of the corporate pay gap and call to rein in their compensation packages were cited by multiple critics and publications.

Clifford sits on the board of KING-FM, and has been a director of companies including Mosaica Education and Todd Shipyards.
