= Kelley Moore =

Kelley Lee Moore (born March 5, 1969) is an American television personality, event planner and author. She hosts the program Moore to Life (canceled) So Much Moore (canceled) and appeared on the local KING-TV program New Day Northwest. Her other appearances have include HGTV, Ellen, The Today Show, The View, Rachael Ray, and Tyra Banks. She wrote the book, Cube Chic: Take Your Office Space from Drab to Fab and was the Entertaining Columnist for Seattle Magazine.

== Career ==
Moore began writing stories about the Northwest for Seattle Magazine and Northwest Home in 2003. Since then, she has appeared on King 5 News and KONG TV, with design, style, and entertaining tips. Her television show, Moore to Life, debuted in 2009 on Seattle's affiliate King 5 TV. And, in the fall of 2009, she appeared as one of three designers on HGTV’s, Halloween Block Party.

Moore has written one book, Cube Chic: Take Your Office Space from Drab to Fab, and is currently working on her second, Design from the Inside Out, due to release in 2010.
