= Patsy Bullitt Collins =

American philanthropist (1920–2003)

- Born: Dorothy Priscilla Bullitt; September 24, 1920; Seattle, Washington
- Died: June 24, 2003 (aged 82); Seattle
- Occupations: Chairperson, King Broadcasting Company
- Known for: Philanthropy (Bullitt Foundation and others)
- Parent(s): A. Scott Bullitt and Dorothy Bullitt
- Relatives: State Senator Josiah Collins; US Solicitor General William Marshall Bullitt

Dorothy Priscilla "Patsy" Bullitt Collins (1920-2003) was an American philanthropist.

Born in Seattle on September 24, 1920 to the wealthy A. Scott Bullitt and Dorothy Bullitt, during her childhood she lived in a 23-room mansion in The Highlands. She graduated from Vassar College in 1942.

She married Josiah Collins VI, son of Seattle politician Josiah Collins, in 1947. Her first husband, Larry Norman, a USAAF navigator, had been killed over Germany or as a POW in 1943.

She was chairperson of King Broadcasting Company, founded by her mother, from 1972 until 1992 when it was sold to The Providence Journal.

After her parents' death, she and her sisters donated $100 million to the Bullitt Foundation for environmental causes, bought classical radio station KING-FM and donated it to the Seattle Symphony, Seattle Opera and what is now ArtsFund.

She died at her home in First Hill, Seattle, on June 24, 2003. She bequeathed a final $71.5 million to CARE, The Nature Conservancy and the Trust for Public Land, among the top 20 largest American charitable donations of the year.
