= My Papa's Waltz =

Poem by Theodore Roethke

"My Papa's Waltz" is a poem written by Theodore Roethke. The poem was first published during 1942 in Hearst Magazine and later in other collections, including the 1948 anthology The Lost Son and Other Poems.

The poem takes place sometime during the poet's childhood and features a boy who loves his father. The boy is waltzing with his father, who is described as having battered knuckles and dirty palms. "My Papa's Waltz" deals with themes of family, relationships, confliction, fear, and love. Like other pieces written by Roethke, "My Papa's Waltz" draws from the poet's relationship with his father. "My Papa's Waltz" is considered to be one of Roethke's best works. It fits into the wider context of Roethke's work due to the role the father plays in the narrative.

The last line of the poem, "Still clinging to your shirt", indicates that the waltz and events that transpired had happened before and would happen again, reinforcing that the boy loves his father, despite the way he is treated.

== Background and origin ==
Roethke began writing poetry while in high school, and began his attempt at approaching poetry more seriously while in graduate school at the University of Michigan. Years before the publication of "My Papa's Waltz", Roethke began suffering from manic depression and was hospitalized in 1935. Roethke continued to struggle with his bipolar disorder for the entirety of his career.

Roethke is believed to have begun "My Papa's Waltz" in 1941. The poem was first published in Hearst Magazine in 1942.

== Themes and tone ==
Since its publication critics have provided varying interpretations of "My Papa's Waltz." Most critics note that the poem is a tug of war between love and fear. Karl Malkoff asserts that the musical meter of "My Papa's Waltz" conveys the boy's combined admiration and fear, and the father's affection and violence. David Mills describes "My Papa's Waltz" as a "lovely rough tenderness" that is meant to make readers feel "uncomfortable", and implies that its central theme is the characteristics and dynamic between the father and son, saying, that because his father died when Roethke was still a young man, the poem offers more sentiment in the line: "But I hung on like death".

The Theodore Roethke Collection at the University of Washington holds two of Roethke's original holographs of "My Papa's Waltz", entitled "MS-A" and "MS-B", which John McKenna feels prove that tone was a poetic device to which Roethke paid close attention. It can be found that Roethke changed the gender of the child from a girl to a boy and the word "unscrew" to "unfrown" in the revised "MS-B" version of the poem. McKenna notes that the first change was most likely made so that Roethke could maintain the frightening feel that was initially intended in the poem by making the parent and child the same gender while keeping a loving tone throughout the dance. McKenna suggests that Roethke's revision of "unscrew" could be due to an unwanted sexual undertone regarding the mother, whereas its focus is structured around the father's imposing ruggedness.

"MS-B" also changed the line "My forehead scraped a buckle" to "My right ear scraped a buckle." This was done in order to add a sense of informality to the dance; with the boy's head facing away from the father, the poem reads as more of a spur of the moment imperfect dance between a child and a parent. The tone then switches from positive to negative with revisions made in the fourth stanza, changing the words "kept" to "beat" and "hand" to "palm". Both of these revisions allow for a change in tone in regard to painting the father as an assertively dominant figure over the boy. It is in these subtle shifts between positive and negative tones that Roethke is swaying readers back and forth, much like a waltzing rhythm.

Through these revisions, Roethke balances negative and positive themes within the waltz taking place and, with this, McKenna argues that there is not a correct way to read "My Papa's Waltz", as no family relationship is easy, and all are "seldom one-dimensional".

Ronald Jannsen states that the poem ends with the tender scene of a father waltzing his son off to bed, which he states contributes further to the poem's balance. This scene could be interpreted in one of two ways: either a heartfelt ending after and arguably negative climax or that the intense violence will be carried over into the bedroom with an implied sexual connotation, especially considering the implication that the father is drunk. Neither endings to Roethke's tale is confirmed; however, both serve two different interpretive tones. The challenge of determining the overall tone and what is actually happening derives from the sense of amusement and merriment that comes with Roethke's word choice, the feelings most associate with dancing, and that the poem reads as though the dance is a consensual act of roughhousing that many fathers and sons do.

Some critics have argued that the violence displayed in the poem is psychological rather than physical, given that in his adulthood, Roethke recites an event that remains unclear as to whether he was abused or not.

== Rhythm and metre ==
"My Papa's Waltz" is made up of an iambic rising rhythm, with stressed and unstressed beats that match the three-beat rhythm of a waltz. The poem has been described as a dance itself and, beneath its surface, the poem's rhythmical elements guide the narrative in its balance between positive and negative thematic interpretations.

Discussing Roethke's prose, Carolyn Kizer states that Roethke set himself a certain expectation of which he was determined to replicate the tone and set the scene of the dance with his father as a child for his readers, and in order to do so he had to implement each poetic device regarding word choice and form. His goal with writing "My Papa's Waltz" was to show what was going on and recapture the feelings that were lived through, not just by simply writing about it.

An extra unstressed syllable on the word "dizzy" is the first instance in which the rhythm has been disrupted in a hypermetric line, throwing it off balance, like the boy during the waltz. This same effect happens with the words "slid from" when the pans slide from the kitchen shelf in the second stanza. This line begins with a trochee, changing the rhythm from rising to falling. In an analysis addressing the rhythm of Roethke's works, Sandford Pinsker suggests that the "metric formality" of "My Papa's Waltz" takes the disorganized rhythms of a tensely emotional experience and cushions it with a sense of cheerful tones, ultimately serving up a satiric wit in its four stanzas.

Roethke's word choice, syntax, and the other elements used to create the rhythm in "My Papa's Waltz" are considered to be the devices that make up the experience of the waltz itself. These devices include the poem's slightly fabricated prosody that allows readers to connect with the boy on a personal level as he dances with his father into the kitchen under frightening and loving circumstances.

== Critical reception ==
Some critics believe that Roethke's struggle with his mental health allowed for him to have a profound outlook on reality, in which he sought to find his place in the world and was granted a "mythical insight" through the highs and lows of his episodic depression. With this insight, it is said that in his writing, Roethke implements the most basic elements of one having lived through divine maturity: "outward journey", "inward growth", and a "loving relationship". As with other works in his collected poetry, "My Papa's Waltz" is Roethke taking himself back into another phase of his life to confront that which he could not in the past.

Most critics today recognize the poet's attempt at a tonal balance between fear and delight, and its implementing of a rocking rhythm in its metre and rhyme-scheme. Critics have noted Roethke's use of a joyfully frolicsome rhythm regarding a poem centered on a child's waltz. "Romped" and "dizzy" are two words used in the poem that most associate with childlike behavior, and it is because of Roethke's diction and word choice that, for years, his readership has overlooked an overarching theme surrounding the poem. Comparing the consistency of the two dominant tones, John Ciardi argues that "My Papa's Waltz" is a "poem of terror" because of the boy's unresponsive unease and the fact that during a supposed good-natured dance he is hurt by his father. His interpretation suggests that the boy's dizzying and the pans sliding off of the kitchen shelf suggests that the waltz described is not a pleasant one, where traditionally the word "romp" would imply a reaction from glee. Ciardi considers the mother's frown, the belt buckle scraping the boy's ear and the boy being struck by his fathers rough hands, and says that the two are romping, yet, until the boy is "dumped into bed" he must "cling like death." Some have urged that the ideas expressed in the poem are a proclamation of animosity towards the poet's father, while other critics have suggested there is an ironic uncertainty, for Roethke's apprehension spawns from feelings of love and hatred clashing with one another throughout his youth and time with his father.

Because of the ongoing debate between those who view the thematic elements of "My Papa's Waltz" in a positive light and those who deem it a traumatic memory, the poem has been both praised and denigrated by critics. George Wolff has compared "My Papa's Waltz" to other works by Roethke, such as "Dolor" and "The Geranium", saying that these, and poems included in "Meditations of an Old Woman", "In a Dark Time", and "The North American Sequence", are "his best and most representative work[s]."

== Remedial usage ==
In analytical psychology, "My Papa's Waltz" and other pieces published in The Lost Son and Other Poems are used as a means of psychotherapy to treat those suffering from alcohol dependence. W. D. Snodgrass claims that Roethke's poems exemplify that human reason and motive are hidden under human emotion in youth and into adulthood, stating that "My Papa's Waltz" allows its reader to approach and reflect on their own personal memories that they have lived through during youth in a manner that remains true to the structure and diction of the Roethke's poem.
