= John Lippman =

American news executive

- Education: Dartmouth College ('71)
- Occupation: News executive
- Years active: 1971–present
- Employer: Voice of America
- Title: Acting director

John Lippman is an American television executive and the acting director of Voice of America. He was formerly senior vice president for news and operations at Univision Television, as well as acting director of the United States Agency for Global Media’s Office of Performance Review. Earlier in his career he was a television news executive at KING-TV, KSTW Channel 11, KIRO-TV, and KCBS-TV.

== Biography ==
=== Early life ===
Lippman is the son of a metal fabricating company owner. He was born in Chicago, and grew up in the Chicago suburb of Glencoe, Illinois, where he was a member of the Glencoe Boy Scouts. He attended New Trier Township High School ('66), and operated the school's 10-watt radio station. He has also lived in Tacoma, Washington.

Lippman graduated from Dartmouth College ('71), majoring in History and Urban Studies. In his senior year, he ran the school's news department, and created and hosted a daily call-in talk show.

=== Early career ===
He started his career as a broadcast engineer. He was then a television station news executive.

In 1971 Lippman joined King Broadcasting at KING-TV in Seattle as a radio reporter, later working as an anchor. In 1976 he left KING, and began working at KSTW Channel 11 in Tacoma, Washington, building a news department. In 1979 Channel 11 fired Lippman amidst disagreements over decisions being made by the station's new general manager.

At age 29 in 1979, he joined CBS affiliate KIRO-TV in Seattle as news director, and he worked there until 1992. During that time, KIRO staff grew increased from 45 to 100, and KIRO-TV was at or near the top of the ratings in the Seattle market for most of the decade. He sparked controversy in 1986 for refusing to air safer sex advertisements, with Bea Kelleigh from the NW AIDS Foundation dubbing the rejections as due to "homophobia". He was then hired as news director at KCBS-TV in Los Angeles in 1992; it was a position he held until 1993, when he was fired amid reports of being "disliked by almost everyone who works in the newsroom" In 1983–85, he was a staff writer and an assistant editor of The Fifth Estate Broadcasting.

For 14 years, from 1996 to 2009, Lippman was Senior Vice President for News and Operations at Univision Television.

=== 2009–present ===
Since 2009, Lippman has worked at the United States Agency for Global Media (USAGM)/Broadcasting Board of Governors. He has been acting director of USAGM's Office of Performance Review, interim General Manager of Radio y Televisión Martí stations, and VOA's Deputy Director for Programming and acting director for Programming.

He was executive producer of Displaced, a VOA documentary from 2019 about Rohingya refugees. It won a Gold World Medal in the International Affairs Documentary category, a Silver World Medal in the Best News Documentary/Special News Program category, and a United Nations Department of Public Information special Bronze Award at the 2019 New York Festivals International TV and Film Awards ceremony at the National Association of Broadcasters show. He also co-wrote and worked as executive producer of the VOA documentary One Day in the Life of Refugees, released in 2020.

As of February 2024, he is the acting director of VOA, a position to which he was appointed on October 1, 2023.
