= Rigsbee =

Rigsbee is a surname. Notable people with the surname include:

- David Rigsbee (born 1949), American poet, contributing editor, and book reviewer
- Shani Rigsbee (born 1967), American singer-songwriter, producer, and actress
