= Carolyn Kizer =

American writer (1925–2014)

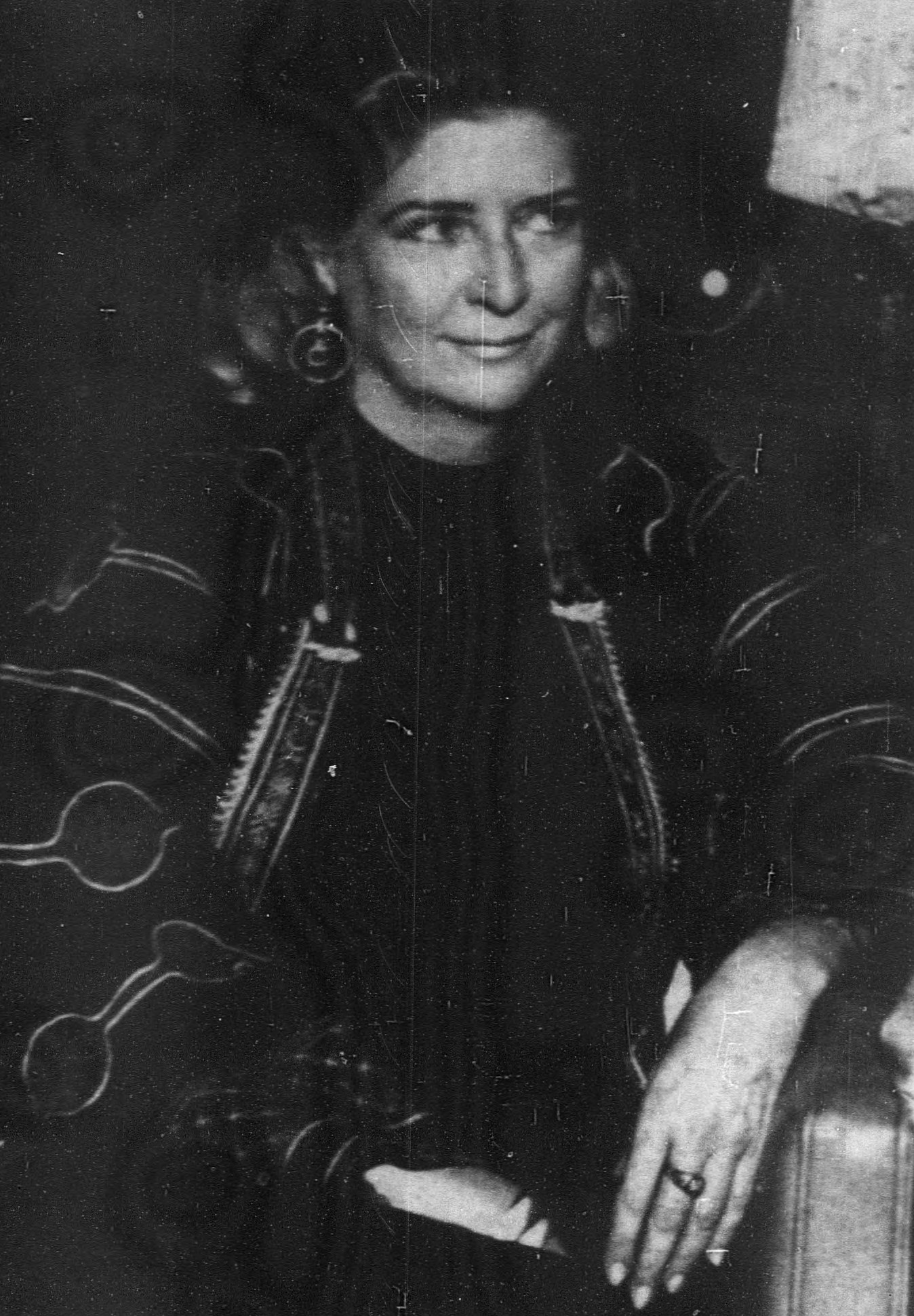
- Kizer, circa 1970
- Born: Carolyn Ashley Kizer; December 10, 1925 Spokane, Washington, U.S.
- Died: October 9, 2014 (aged 88) Sonoma, California, U.S.
- Occupation: Poet
- Language: English, Chinese, Urdu
- Education: Sarah Lawrence College (BA); Columbia University; University of Washington
- Period: 1961–2001
- Genre: Poetry
- Notable awards: Pulitzer Prize
- Spouse: Charles Stimson Bullitt (1946–1954, divorced); John Marshall Woodbridge
- Children: 3 (including Jill Bullitt)

Carolyn Ashley Kizer (December 10, 1925 – October 9, 2014) was an American poet of the Pacific Northwest whose works reflect her feminism. She won the Pulitzer Prize in 1985.

According to an article at the Center for the Study of the Pacific Northwest, "Kizer reach[ed] into mythology in poems like Semele Recycled; into politics, into feminism, especially in her series of poems called "Pro Femina"; into science, the natural world, music, and translations and commentaries on Japanese and Chinese literatures".

== Life ==
Kizer was born in Spokane, Washington, the daughter of a socially prominent Spokane couple.

Her father, Benjamin Hamilton Kizer (1878–1978), who was 45 when she was born, was a successful attorney. Her mother, Mabel Ashley Kizer, was a professor of biology who had received her doctorate from Stanford University.

Kizer was once asked if she agreed with a description of her father as someone who "came across as supremely structured, intelligent, polite but always somewhat remote". Her reply: "Add 'authoritarian and severe', and you get a pretty good approximation of how he appeared to that stranger, his child". At times, she related, her father gave her the same "viscera-shriveling" voice she heard him use later on "members of the House Un-American Activities Committee and other villains of the 1950s, to even more devastating effect", and, she added, "I almost forgave him."

After graduating from Lewis and Clark High School in Spokane, she went on to get her bachelor's degree from Sarah Lawrence College (where she studied comparative mythologies with Joseph Campbell) in 1945 and study as a graduate at both Columbia University (1945–46) and the University of Washington (1946–47).

She then moved back to Washington state, and in 1946 married Charles Stimson Bullitt, an attorney from a wealthy and influential Seattle family, with whom she had three children; Fred Nemo, Jill Bullitt, and Ashley Bullitt. Her husband was the son of Dorothy Bullitt, who founded the Bullitt Foundation and the King Broadcasting Company. In 1954 she enrolled in a creative writing workshop run by poet Theodore Roethke. "Kizer had three small kids, a big house on North Capitol Hill, enough money to get by and more than enough talent and determination. And although one of her poems had been published in The New Yorker when she was 17, she remembers that she needed a nudge from Roethke to get serious." Her marriage to Bullitt ended in divorce in 1954. In 1959, she helped found Poetry Northwest and served as its editor until 1965.

She was a "Specialist in Literature" for the U.S. State Department in Pakistan 1965–1966, during which she taught for several months in that country. In 1966, she became the first director of Literary Programs for the newly created National Endowment for the Arts. She resigned that post in 1970, when the N.E.A. chairman, Roger L. Stevens, was fired by President Richard Nixon. She was a consultant to the N.E.A. for the following year.

In the 1970s and 1980s, she held appointments as poet-in-residence or lecturer at universities across the country including Columbia, Stanford, Princeton, San Jose State University and the University of North Carolina at Chapel Hill. She has been a visiting writer at literary conferences and events across the country, as well as in Dublin, Ireland, and Paris. Kizer was also a member of the faculty of the Iowa Writer's Workshop.

She was appointed to the post of Chancellor of the Academy of American Poets in 1995, but resigned three years later to protest the absence of women and minorities on the governing board.

Kizer was married to the architect-historian, John Marshall Woodbridge. When she was not teaching and lecturing, she divided her time between their home in Sonoma, California, and their apartment in Paris.

She died on October 9, 2014, in Sonoma, California, due to effects of dementia.

== Bibliography ==
=== As author ===
Poetry

- Cool, Calm, and Collected: Poems 1960-2000. Copper Canyon Press. 2001. ISBN 978-1-55659-181-5.
- Pro Femina: A Poem BkMk Press, University of Missouri-Kansas City, 2000, ISBN 9781886157309
- Harping On: Poems 1985-1995, Copper Canyon Press, 1996, ISBN 9781556591150
- The Nearness of You, Copper Canyon Press, 1986, ISBN 9780914742968
- Yin, BOA Editions, 1984, ISBN 9780918526441 — Pulitzer Prize winner
- Mermaids in the basement: poems for women, Copper Canyon Press, 1984, ISBN 9780914742807
- Midnight Was My Cry: New and Selected Poems, Doubleday, 1971
- Knock Upon Silence, Doubleday, 1965
- The Ungrateful Garden, 1961; Carnegie Mellon University Press, 1999, ISBN 9780887482762

Prose

- Picking and Choosing: Prose on Prose, Eastern Washington University Press, 1995, ISBN 9780910055253
- Proses: Essays on Poets and Poetry, Copper Canyon Press, 1993, ISBN 9781556590450

Translations

- Carrying Over: Translations from Chinese, Urdu, Macedonian, Hebrew and French-African (Copper Canyon Press, 1986)

=== As editor ===
- 100 Great Poems by Women HarperCollins, 1995, ISBN 9780880015813
- The Essential Clare (1992)

== Awards ==
- Pulitzer Prize for Poetry (1985), for Yin
- Theodore Roethke Memorial Poetry Prize (1988)
- American Academy of Arts and Letters award
- Award of Honor of the San Francisco Arts Commission
- Borestone Award (six times)
- Pushcart Prize (three times)
- Frost Medal
- John Masefield Memorial Award
- Governor's Award for the best book of the year, State of Washington (1965, 1985)
