= KING-TV =

Television station in Seattle

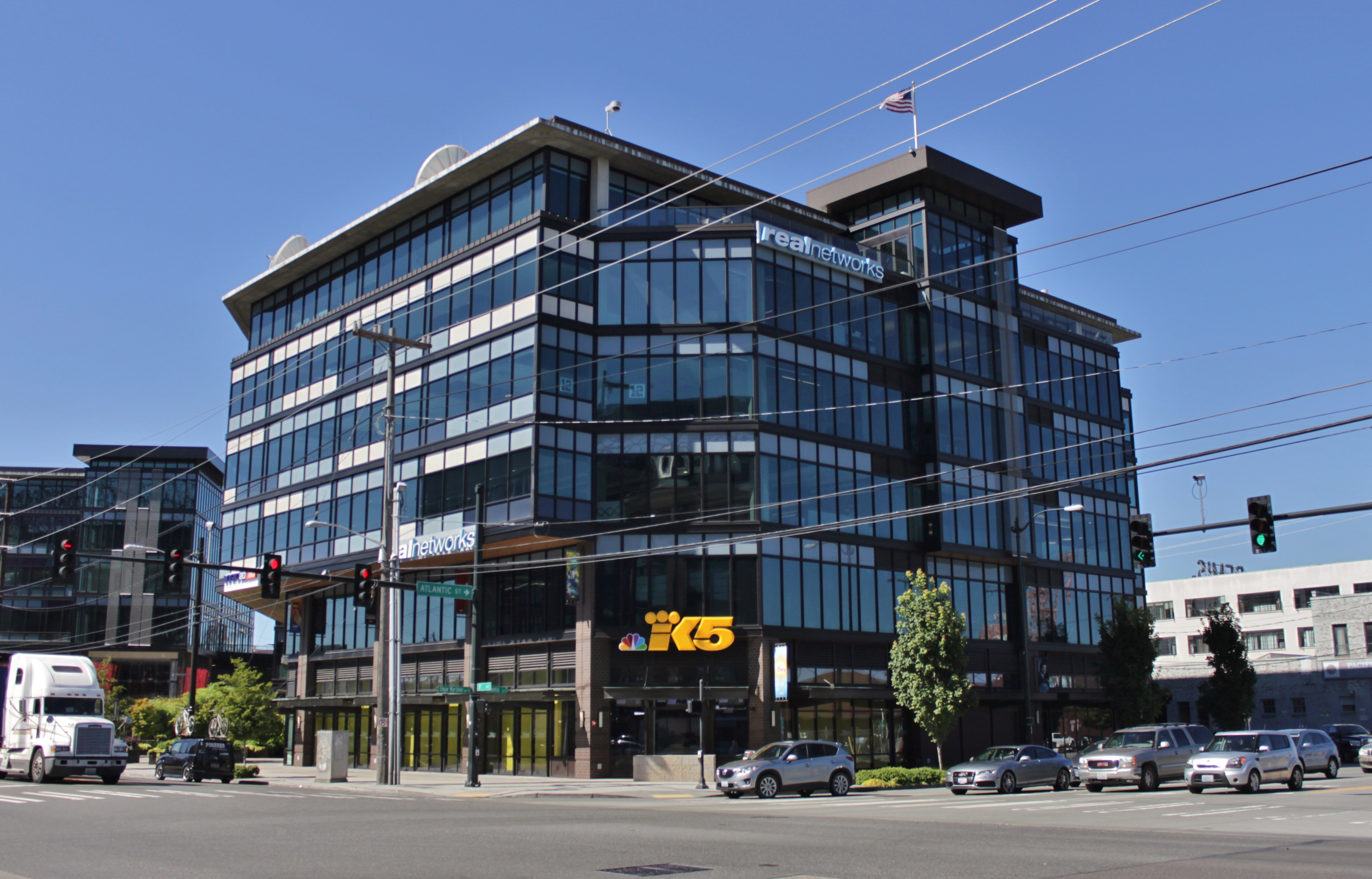
- Home Plate Center, the station's studio since 2016
- Seattle–Tacoma–Everett, Washington; United States
- City: Seattle, Washington
- Channels: Digital: 25 (UHF); Virtual: 5
- Branding: KING 5

Programming
- Affiliations: 5.1: NBC; for others, see § Subchannels

Ownership
- Owner: Tegna Inc., a subsidiary of Nexstar Media Group; (King Broadcasting Company)
- Sister stations: KONG

History
- First air date: November 25, 1948
- Former call signs: KRSC-TV (1948–1949)
- Former channel numbers: Analog: 5 (VHF, 1948–2009); Digital: 48 (UHF, 1999–2019)
- Former affiliations: CBS (1948–1953); ABC (secondary 1948−1953, primary 1953–1959); NBC (secondary, 1948–1953 and 1958–1959); DuMont (secondary, 1948–1956)
- Call sign meaning: King Broadcasting Company

Technical information
- Licensing authority: FCC
- Facility ID: 34847
- ERP: 715 kW
- HAAT: 232.1 m (761 ft)
- Transmitter coordinates: 47°37′54″N 122°21′3″W

Links
- Public license information: Public file; LMS
- Website: www.king5.com

KING-TV (channel 5) is a television station in Seattle, Washington, United States, affiliated with NBC. It is owned by the Tegna subsidiary of Nexstar Media Group alongside Everett-licensed KONG (channel 16), an independent station. The two stations share studios at the Home Plate Center on 1st Avenue South in the SoDo district of Seattle; KING-TV's transmitter is located in the city's Queen Anne neighborhood.

Debuting as the first television station in the Pacific Northwest, channel 5 was purchased by and became the flagship station of Dorothy Bullitt's King Broadcasting Company eight months into broadcasting; the company still exists as a license holder for its properties under Nexstar ownership. The station became an NBC affiliate in 1959 and has generally led the Seattle television market since.

== History ==
Channel 5 first took to the air as KRSC-TV on November 25, 1948, becoming the first television station in the Pacific Northwest (within six years, it became the Pacific Northwest's first color broadcaster on July 1, 1954). The station was originally owned by Palmer K. Leberman's Radio Sales Corporation, which also operated KRSC radio (1150 AM, now KKNW, and FM 98.1, now KING-FM); the original call sign was derived from Leberman's company. The first broadcast on channel 5 was a live remote of a Thanksgiving Day high school football game—the telecast was plagued with technical difficulties, but local viewers reported being impressed nonetheless. Channel 5 was originally a primary CBS affiliate, and carried secondary affiliations with NBC, ABC and DuMont.

Eight months after the television station debuted, KRSC-TV and KRSC-FM were purchased by King Broadcasting Company, owners of KING radio (1090 AM, now KPTR) and the original KING-FM (94.9, frequency now occupied by KUOW-FM), for $375,000 in May 1949. The station changed its call sign to KING-TV to match its radio sisters (according to legend, King Broadcasting president Dorothy Bullitt purchased the KING call letters while on a fishing boat). For many years, the stations' logo was "King Mike", an anthropomorphized microphone in ermine robes and a crown, drawn by cartoonist Walt Disney (its sister stations in Portland, Oregon, KGW-AM-FM-TV, used a similar logo, called "Pioneer Mike"; the King Mike logo was later brought back for KING's 50th anniversary in 1998 and still appears in promotional announcements to this day).

Once the Federal Communications Commission (FCC)-imposed freeze on television station license awards ended in 1952, KING-TV lost its monopoly in the market. During 1953, the Seattle–Tacoma area received three new stations: KTNT-TV (channel 11, now KSTW) debuted in March as the market's CBS outlet; while NBC went to KMO-TV (channel 13, now KCPQ), which signed on in August. NBC moved a few months later to KOMO-TV (channel 4), which went on the air in December. By the end of the year, KING-TV was left with poor-performing ABC and DuMont, the latter of which ceased operations in 1956. Subsequently, Bullitt lobbied NBC for a group affiliation for her stations, and in October 1958, KING-TV and KGW-TV in Portland began carrying NBC programming. In Seattle, channel 5 shared NBC and ABC with KOMO-TV for most of the 1958–59 television season. On September 27, 1959, KING-TV became an exclusive NBC station and KOMO-TV affiliated with ABC full-time. KING-TV is one of a few handful of stations in the country to have held a primary affiliation with all of the "Big Three" networks.

Dissatisfied with Stimson Bullitt's management style, Dorothy Bullitt, and Mr. Bullitt's sisters, arranged for his voluntary resignation from King Broadcasting in 1972. Stimson sold his company shares to his sisters, Harriet and Patsy. He then received control of the family's real estate interests. Ancil Payne, who had served as general manager of the company's Portland stations since 1965, became president and CEO. By the 1970s and 1980s, KING-TV was the flagship of a growing regional media empire which at various times included ventures in publishing, the film industry, cable television systems (under the name of King Videocable, the assets of which have by now been absorbed into Comcast) and even various timber assets in the Far East.

Locally produced programs that debuted on the station during the 1970s and 1980s included Seattle Today/Good Company, a mid-morning talk show hosted by Cliff Lenz and Shirley Hudson and later by Susan Michaels and Colby Chester; Seattle Tonight, Tonite!, hosted by Ross McGowan and later Dick Klinger; Almost Live!, originally a Sunday night talk and comedy show hosted by Ross Shafer, that later became an ensemble sketch comedy show (that eventually moved to Saturday nights) after Shafer left to become host of The Late Show on Fox; and a local Evening Magazine franchise, first hosted by Penny LeGate and Brian Tracey. Of these, only Evening Magazine (now entitled simply Evening) exists today. How Come?, a half-hour early Sunday evening family television program hosted by Al Wallace, won several awards during its run during the 1970s and early 1980s. The show covered topics on how things were made or done in the world. Dick Klinger hosted the show after Al Wallace died.

King Broadcasting's stations included KGW radio and television in Portland, KREM-TV in Spokane, KTVB-TV in Boise, KHNL-TV and KFVE in Honolulu and KYA radio in San Francisco. Long-time station-owner Dorothy Bullitt died in June 1989. Dorothy Bullitt's daughters Harriet Bullitt and Priscilla "Patsy" Bullitt Collins decided to sell the King assets in 1992—eventually selling King Broadcasting (including KING, KREM, KGW, KTVB, KHNL/KFVE and the cable provider assets) to The Providence Journal Company. KING-TV and other King Broadcasting stations later became Belo properties as a result of that company's merger with The Providence Journal Company in 1997. As a result, Belo was forced to divest KIRO-TV to Cox Enterprises in order to keep the higher rated KING-TV.

Bonneville International Corporation purchased KING (AM) in 1994. During the 1990s, Almost Live!, as it became a pure comedy show, launched the careers of Bill Nye the Science Guy, Joel McHale (of The Soup fame) nationally and locally, Pat Cashman and John Keister (who replaced Ross Shafer as host of that show in 1988). KING-TV was also the home for Watch This!, a fast-paced Emmy Award-winning show aimed at children and teenagers; the show lasted five years and was hosted by local anchors, Jim Dever and Mimi Gan. On December 18, 1995, King Broadcasting launched Northwest Cable News (NWCN), which was a 24-hour regional cable news channel available primarily to cable providers in Washington, Oregon, and Idaho with lesser cable coverage in Alaska, Montana and California. Almost Live! ended after 15 years in 1999.

=== Gannett/Tegna, move to SoDo ===
On June 13, 2013, the Gannett Company announced that it would acquire Belo. The sale was completed on December 23. On June 29, 2015, Gannett's newspaper business was spun out, with KING-TV and Gannett's former TV properties renamed Tegna.

In April 2014, KING-TV announced plans to sell its South Lake Union headquarters and re-locate, taking advantage of a booming real estate market in the South Union Lake area. In September 2014, it was reported that the station was planning to lease multiple floors at the Home Plate Center, a complex in the SoDo area of Seattle, and located across the street from T-Mobile Park (formerly Safeco Field). In March 2015, Gannett confirmed that KING, KONG, and NWCN would move to the lower three floors of the Home Plate Center, and announced plans for KING-TV to utilize the lower floor for the market's first street-side studio. The former facilities were sold to Kilroy Realty for nearly $50 million, and were demolished during the summer of 2016, and would be replaced by mixed-use developments.

The choice of a smaller location was in response to concerns that the large size of its previous facility inhibited collaboration. The ground floor contains two studios: a street-side studio for KING-TV's news programming, and the other for local productions such as New Day Northwest. The newsroom is located on the second floor, and contained NWCN's main set. The new facility was equipped with new Grass Valley master control, graphics, and playout hardware, and Sony automation equipment. After broadcasting its final newscast from the North Dexter Avenue studio on February 12, 2016, KING quietly transitioned its master control to Home Plate Center during that night's broadcast of Late Night with Seth Meyers, and began broadcasting newscasts from the new facility the following morning.

On January 6, 2017, NWCN was shut down due to declining viewership, the free online streaming of KING and KONG's newscasts, and the reluctance of local cable systems to pay more for the channel to keep it operating.

Nexstar Media Group acquired Tegna in a deal announced in August 2025 and completed on March 19, 2026. A temporary restraining order issued one week later by the U.S. District Court for the Eastern District of California, later escalated to a preliminary injunction, has prevented Nexstar from integrating the Tegna stations.

== Programming ==
KING-TV relies less on syndicated programming and more on the station's newscasts and local programming. As of April 2026, KING-TV broadcasts only three syndicated programs during its weekday schedule—Extra, Inside Edition, and Access Hollywood. Despite this, KING-TV was airing 3 1/2 hours of syndicated programming prior to September 2013.

On New Year's Eve, KING-TV broadcasts coverage of the fireworks show on the Space Needle.

=== Sports programming ===
KING-TV opted not to carry NBC's telecasts of the Stanley Cup Final in 2006, 2007, 2008 and 2013, when the games began at 5 p.m. Pacific time, choosing to instead air its regular lineup of local newscasts and syndicated shows. KONG picked up the NBC telecasts of the games, and CBC Television's broadcasts of the games were available to most cable providers in the region through the network's Vancouver owned-and-operated station CBUT. For the 2007 and 2008 Stanley Cup Finals, however, KING-TV aired NBC's Saturday night telecasts, while KONG aired the other NBC telecasts. As for the 2009 Stanley Cup Final, KING-TV aired games 1, 2 and 5 while KONG aired games 6 and 7.

KING-TV has been the official television partner of the Seattle Seahawks since 2022, airing preseason games and team-focused shows; previous stints with the team were held from 1981 to 2000 and again from 2004 to 2011 (sister station KONG carried Seahawks preseason games in 2003 and 2004). The station also airs Seahawks games through NBC's broadcast contract with the NFL (via Sunday Night Football; it has also served as the team's unofficial home station, carrying most games from 1977 to 1997 when the team played in the AFC, which NBC held the broadcast rights to in those years). Notably, this included the Seahawks' appearance in Super Bowl XLIX and victory in Super Bowl LX; both of these Super Bowls featured them playing against the New England Patriots. Both KING-TV and KONG served as official television broadcasters of the city's Major League Soccer club Seattle Sounders FC from 2009 to 2013, in which KONG aired a weekly magazine program on Sunday nights during the season called Sounders FC Weekly, and was rebroadcast Mondays on sister cable channel Northwest Cable News.

KING-TV served as the inaugural flagship television station of the Seattle Mariners, carrying 17 regular season road games from 1977 through 1980; a spring training game was added to the season broadcast schedule after the inaugural season. The station aired 20 games in 1981 as part of a partnership extension through 1983 under then-new team owner George Argyros, but the team's desire to air more games led it to end the deal early and sign with KSTW instead after the season. KING-TV became the official television partner of the Mariners again in 2026 when it reached a deal with the team to additionally simulcast 10 regular-season games from in-house broadcaster Mariners.TV, with the latter having shut down Root Sports Northwest after the previous season; as part of the deal, the station airs a program called On Deck the Wednesday before each game.

KING-TV also broadcast all Seattle SuperSonics games covered through NBC's NBA broadcast contract from 1990 to 2002, including the team's 1996 NBA Finals appearance.

Beginning in the 2024–25 season, KING airs select Seattle Kraken NHL games as co-flagship of the Kraken Hockey Network, with the majority of regional games being carried by KONG. With the team's move to the Big Ten Conference in the 2024 season, KING may also occasionally air Washington Huskies football games as part of NBC's college football coverage.

=== News operation ===
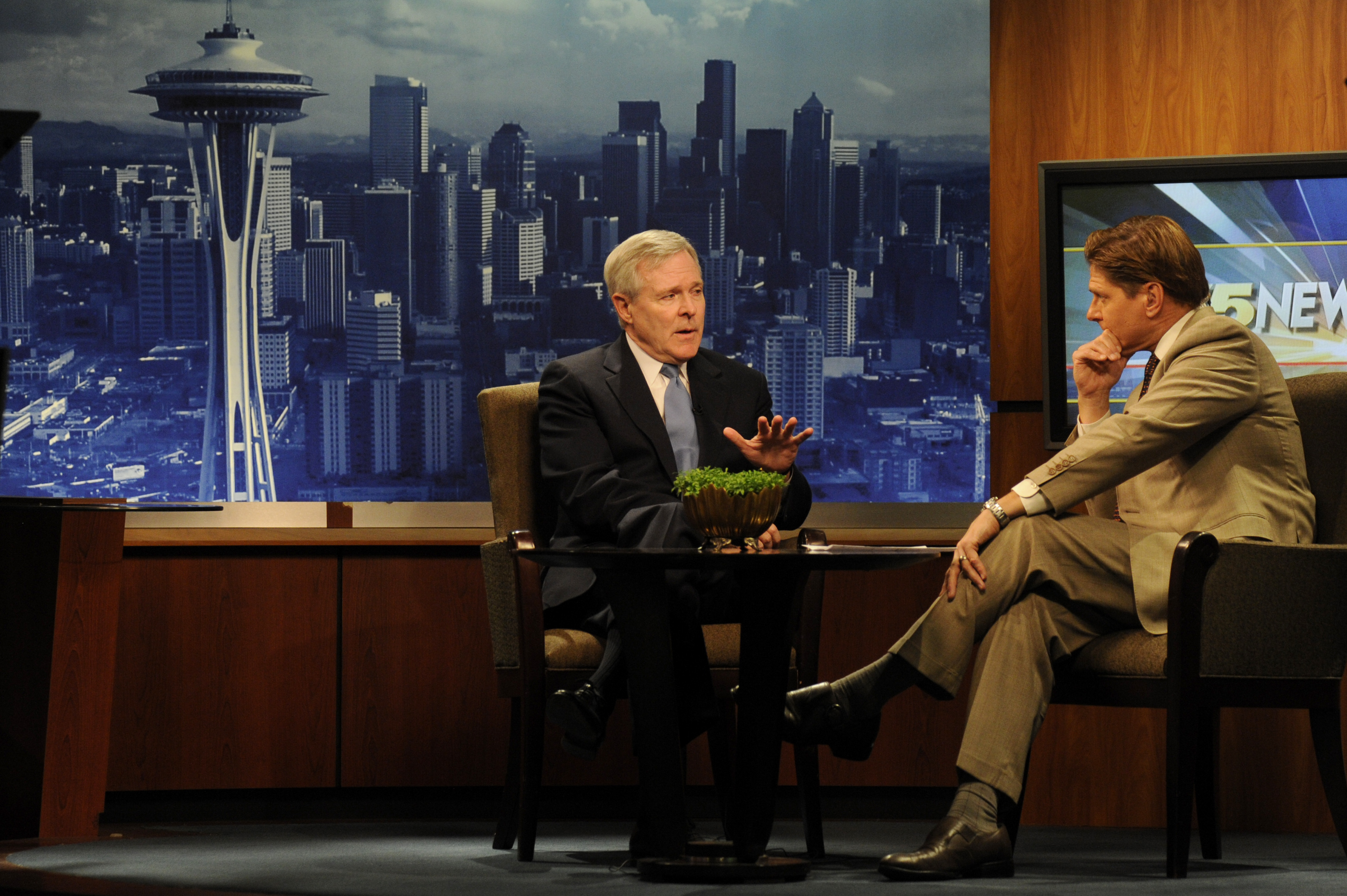
A morning news interview with the Secretary of the United States Navy Ray Mabus.

KING-TV presently broadcasts 46 hours of locally produced newscasts each week (with seven hours each weekday, six hours on Saturdays and five hours on Sundays).

In 1999, to compete against KOMO-TV, KING-TV began broadcasting its newscasts in high definition; at the time it only had one HD-capable studio camera. In April 2007, KING-TV upgraded all of its studio cameras, graphics and weather system to high definition and began broadcasting its public affairs programming in HD as well. Field reports continued to be broadcast in standard definition (480i converted to 1080i HD for telecast) but were taped in a 16:9 aspect ratio, giving the appearance of high-definition. According to KING-TV, it is "Seattle's First HD Newscast".

Following its sale to the company, KING-TV adopted Gannett's standardized newscast presentation, which used a color coding system modeled upon co-owned newspaper USA Today.

==== Notable former on-air staff ====
- Dennis Bounds – weekday morning anchor, later weeknight evening anchor (1991–2016)
- Aaron Brown – evening co-anchor
- Jim Compton – host of The Compton Report (1985–1999)
- Lou Dobbs – anchor
- Jean Enersen – Seattle's first female news anchor (1972–2016)
- Joe Fryer – general assignment/special projects reporter (2010–2013)
- Grant Goodeve – Northwest Backroads host
- Jack Hamann – reporter
- David Kerley
- Margaret Larson – reporter/late-night anchor, New Day Northwest host
- John Lippman – anchor (1971–1976)
- Lori Matsukawa – weeknight anchor (1983–2019)
- Tonya Mosley – anchor/reporter
- Mark Mullen – morning/noon co-anchor
- Shannon O'Donnell – weather anchor (1996–2000 and 2007–2009)
- Greg Palmer – reporter
- Don Poier
- Wendy Tokuda – reporter/anchor (1974-1977)

== Technical information ==
=== Subchannels ===
The station's signal is multiplexed:

Subchannels of KING-TV
Subchannel	Res.	Short name	Programming
5.1	1080i	KING-HD	NBC
5.2	480i	Crime	True Crime Network
5.3	480i	Quest	Quest
5.4	480i	THE-365	365BLK
5.5	480i	QVC2	QVC2
16.1	1080i	KONG-HD	KONG (Independent)

Broadcast on behalf of another station

On December 6, 2011, Belo signed an agreement with the Live Well Network to affiliate with digital subchannels of KING-TV and Spokane sister station KSKN; Live Well Network replaced Universal Sports on digital subchannel 5.2 on January 1, 2012, as Universal Sports transitioned into a cable and satellite channel during the first quarter of 2012. Justice Network replaced Live Well Network on 5.2 in January 2015.

=== Analog-to-digital conversion ===
KING-TV ended regular programming over its analog signal, on June 12, 2009, as part of the federally mandated transition from analog to digital television. As the "analog nightlight" station for the Seattle–Tacoma market, it aired a loop reminding viewers to get a digital converter box on analog channel 5 until June 26, 2009. The station's digital signal remained on its pre-transition UHF channel 48, using virtual channel 5.

== Canadian and out-of-market coverage ==
KING-TV is one of five Seattle television stations that are available in Canada on satellite providers Bell Satellite TV and Shaw Direct, and is available to most cable subscribers in the Vancouver–Victoria, British Columbia, area as the NBC affiliate. The station is also carried on several cable providers in southeastern Alaska and northwestern Oregon, as well as in the Yakima DMA cities of Cle Elum and Ellensburg, with NBC programming and some syndicated shows blacked out due to FCC regulations. KING-TV is also carried in The Bahamas on REV TV.
