= Dennis Bounds =

American news anchor

Dennis Bounds is a former weeknight news anchor for KING-TV, a television station in Seattle, Washington. Dennis started with KING-TV in March 1991 and accepted a retirement buy-out by Tegna, formerly Gannett, in April 2016. He is no longer be seen on KING-TV, after 25 years with the station. He lives in Redmond, Washington.

Bounds graduated from the University of North Dakota in 1974. He received a BA in sociology.

== News Anchor career ==
On December 14, 1994, Bounds was promoted from the morning/noon newscasts to the weeknights evening news, a role he has held since then. In April 2016, Bounds took a voluntary retirement offer, along with long-time co-anchor Jean Enersen, former chief meteorologist Jeff Renner, and reporter Linda Byron.
