= Kraken Hockey Network =

The Kraken Hockey Network (KHN) is the broadcasting unit of the Seattle Kraken of the National Hockey League. Introduced in the 2024–25 NHL season, it broadcasts Kraken games not televised by the NHL's national broadcast partners, succeeding Root Sports Northwest. KHN is broadcast across a mix of free-to-air television and streaming outlets, including a network of broadcast television stations across the team's market, as well as streaming on Amazon Prime Video for Amazon Prime subscribers within the team's market.

== History ==
Ahead of its inaugural 2021–22 season, Root Sports Northwest—a regional sports network owned by the Seattle Mariners and WarnerMedia—acquired the regional rights to the Seattle Kraken under a multi-year deal. In December 2023, amid the dismantling of the AT&T SportsNet chain by Warner Bros. Discovery, the Mariners acquired the channel outright (Root Sports Northwest would outsource production of its broadcasts to MLB Local Media beginning in 2025, and closed at the conclusion of the season). In April 2024, the Kraken announced a new broadcasting arrangement in partnership with Tegna Inc. and Amazon, under which its regional games would air on a network of Tegna stations led by KING-TV and KONG, and stream on Amazon Prime Video. In September 2024, it was announced that the venture would be known as the Kraken Hockey Network. KONG airs most games, while KING airs approximately 15 marquee regional games per-season. KONG also carries the weekly magazine program Kraken Home Ice.

Former Root Sports producer and director Ryan Schaber and Patrick Brown were retained by KHN; Schaber stated that he had been personally thanked by Kraken fans for his work on exxpanding the availability of the team's games, stating that "it makes me feel good because I think we've always done good work and put on a good product."

In February 2026, the Kraken announced a multi-year renewal with Tegna and Amazon.

== Personnel ==
Former Hartford Whalers and Carolina Hurricanes broadcaster John Forslund is the Kraken's television play-by-play announcer, and J. T. Brown is the team's primary television color commentator, while Eddie Olczyk remained the team's analyst. Ahead of the 2026–27 season, Olczyk stepped down to focus on his analyst role at TNT. Ian Furness serves as the host for most KHN games, while Linda Cohn hosts games aired by KING.

== Carriage ==
KHN is carried primarily by Tegna stations within the Kraken market, with deals having also been reached with selected Cox Media Group, Gray Media, and Morgan Murphy Media stations among others.

Games are carried by broadcast affiliates in Seattle (KONG and KING-TV), Spokane (KREM and KSKN), and Yakima (KAPP and KVEW), Washington; Eugene (KEVU and KLSR-TV) and Portland (KGW-DT2 and KGW), Oregon; Anchorage (KAUU) and Juneau (KYEX-LD), Alaska; and Boise (KTVB) and Twin Falls (KTFT), Idaho.
