= KONG (TV) =

Television station in Everett, Washington

ATSC 3.0 station
- Everett–Seattle–Tacoma, Washington; United States
- City: Everett, Washington
- Channels: Digital: 31 (UHF); Virtual: 16
- Branding: KONG

Programming
- Affiliations: 16.1: Independent; for others, see § Technical information and subchannels

Ownership
- Owner: Tegna Inc., a subsidiary of Nexstar Media Group; (KONG-TV, Inc.)
- Sister stations: KING-TV

History
- First air date: July 7, 1997
- Former channel number: Analog: 16 (UHF, 1997–2009)
- Call sign meaning: Counterpart of KING, as in King Kong; call sign chosen in 1984, years before KING programmed the station

Technical information
- Licensing authority: FCC
- Facility ID: 35396
- ERP: 715 kW
- HAAT: 232 m (761 ft)
- Transmitter coordinates: 47°37′54″N 122°21′3″W

Links
- Public license information: Public file; LMS
- Website: www.king5.com

KONG (channel 16) is an independent television station licensed to Everett, Washington, United States, serving the Seattle area. It is owned by the Tegna subsidiary of Nexstar Media Group alongside NBC affiliate KING-TV (channel 5). The two stations share studios at the Home Plate Center on 1st Avenue South in the SoDo district of Seattle; KONG's transmitter is located in the city's Queen Anne neighborhood.

Plans for KONG dated as far back as the early 1980s, when a San Francisco–based investor group obtained the construction permit for a new station in Everett. The group secured the call sign KONG—over threats by KING-TV to sue—and set up a studio, but the station never launched. A dispute over the tower site on Cougar Mountain and difficulty securing financing scuttled the project. The permit was sold to Zeus Corporation of Washington and lay dormant until KING-TV agreed to program the new station in 1996. KONG went on the air in 1997, relying heavily on classic TV series for its programming. It has become a secondary conduit for local news and sports programming from KING-TV; the first newscast on KONG debuted in 1999, and over the years, teams including the Seattle SuperSonics, Seattle Storm, and Seattle Sounders FC aired their games on KONG. Presently, the station is the broadcast home for Seattle Reign FC and the Seattle Kraken. It is one of two ATSC 3.0 stations in the Seattle market.

== History ==
=== Early permit history ===
In 1981, the Federal Communications Commission (FCC) designated four applications for comparative hearing, all seeking the channel 16 allocation at Everett, submitted by Oak Television of Everett; Unity Broadcasting Company of Washington State; Greater Everett Telecasters; and Channel 16, Inc. The designation followed a year of applications. At one point, FNI Communications—a subsidiary of First Northwest Industries, owner of the Seattle SuperSonics basketball team—applied. Channel 16, Inc., was part-owned by Jon Marple, owner of Everett radio station KRKO. Unity, a group led by San Francisco oil marketer Carl Washington and featuring almost entirely minority stockholders, was selected by administrative law judge Joseph Chachkin in November 1982 on account of its lack of other broadcast ownership and strongest integration of ownership and management. As part of a settlement, Sam Schulman, by this time the former owner of the SuperSonics, owned shares in Unity.

Unity selected KONG as its proposed call sign. This triggered opposition from Seattle's KING-TV and its owner, King Broadcasting, which believed that the two stations could cause confusion; KONG hoped that the original 1933 film King Kong could be its first program and planned to operate as an independent station with sports, movies, and reruns, from a main studio near Paine Field. Instead, KONG found itself delayed by a tower siting controversy. It applied to the FCC to build a 300-foot (91 m) tower on Cougar Mountain, near Issaquah. The mast would be used by KRAB, which owned the land, and two other FM radio stations. Residents near the mountain protested, fearing that electromagnetic radiation could affect their health. King County initially required a more in-depth environmental review before the new tower received approval in April 1985. KONG had intended to be on the air by September 1984 and purchased $8 million (equivalent to $20.9 million in 2025) in programming to meet that date, but the tower siting decision left the station indebted to program distributors, paying rent on a studio and storing a transmitter—all assets that it could not immediately use. For years, KONG promised it would be on the air, but continued appeals of the tower siting decision and delays in securing financing held the station back. During this time, the Home Shopping Network looked at buying the unbuilt KONG.

The originally planned KONG never materialized. Mike Henderson, a columnist for The Herald in Everett, attempted to reach the station in August 1988 and found its Seattle telephone number had been disconnected and its principals had vanished. Carl Gipson, who had been involved with Unity, noted that the company had simply been overwhelmed by the cost of endless problems and court actions over the tower siting dispute; The Herald's Allan May declared KONG "pretty well dead". In 1989, a public auction was held for station equipment and supplies, which included a satellite dish and receiving equipment. The permit was sold to Zeus Corporation of Washington, owned by Walter Ulloa and Paul Zevnik, for $300,000 (equivalent to $676,942 in 2025).

=== Absorption by KING-TV ===
In August 1996, KING reached an agreement to program KONG under a local marketing agreement, with an option to buy if the FCC permitted duopoly ownership. It began broadcasting on July 7, 1997. KONG's programming relied heavily on classic TV series of the 1950s through 1980s with a "campy", irreverent approach to presentation and imaging; a large KONG Gong was taken around the area as a promotional device, and people were encouraged to ring it on camera. Also present on the original schedule were programs from two cable services owned, like KING-TV, by the Belo Corporation: Northwest Cable News and Food Network. Nancy Guppy, a cast member on KING-TV's comedy show Almost Live!, doubled as a host appearing between shows. When the FCC permitted duopolies in November 1999, Belo bought KONG from Zeus.

During early marketing for the station it was stylized as "KONG 6/16" referencing the channel 6, which it was assigned on most Washington cable services, and channel 16, which was the OTA broadcast channel for the station. The KONG logo included the channel numbers, to coincide with KING-TV's logo at the time, which stylized it at "KING 5". By the mid-2000s, the logo was redesigned to be similar to KING-TV's logo at the time, but with a blue hue, to differentiate it from KING's. By 2015, the logo frequently dropped the channel numbers, as they were largely irrelevant in the age of DTV and streaming. In 2016, the logo was updated to more match that of KING-TVs, including the gold accents, larger "K", and the "crown" on top of the "K". In 2024, the font was changed, the letters were set at the same height, and KONG returned to being a blue hue, but retained the "crown".

KONG launched a digital signal on channel 31 on February 1, 2002, and shut down its analog signal on June 12, 2009. KONG was one of two ATSC-M/H Mobile DTV model stations in Seattle alongside KOMO-TV.

Belo, including KING-TV and KONG, was acquired by the Gannett Company in 2013. Gannett split its print and broadcast operations into separate companies, the latter named Tegna, in 2015. KING and KONG moved their operations from the longtime KING studios on Dexter Avenue to Home Plate Center in 2016.

Nexstar Media Group acquired Tegna in a deal announced in August 2025 and completed in March 2026.

== Local programming ==
=== Newscasts ===
KONG began airing local newscasts on February 1, 1999, with the debut of the half-hour KING 5 News at 10, originally anchored by Lori Matsukawa. The newscast, postponed from a late 1998 start when the news director resigned, brought Seattle back to having competing newscasts in the time period (opposite KCPQ) after KSTW folded its news department months prior. Originally a weeknight-only newscast, it expanded to seven nights a week in January 2001; a 7 p.m. newscast was dropped because of sports preemptions.

In 2004, KONG launched a morning show, originally named Seattle Live, to compete with KCPQ. On September 9, 2013, KONG added a weeknight 9 p.m. newscast from KING.

=== Sports ===
Seattle SuperSonics basketball games began airing in 1999, and KONG became the primary local television broadcaster for the team over the next two seasons, with 36 games in the 1999–2000 season and the entire 56-game local TV slate starting in the 2000–01 season. In 2000, the expansion Seattle Storm of the WNBA began airing a package of local telecasts on KONG. The SuperSonics and Storm departed for FSN Northwest in 2004, when the NBA team opted to move all its games to cable and get out of the production business. After the SuperSonics were relocated to Oklahoma City, KONG and one of KING-TV's subchannels aired a package of Portland Trail Blazers basketball games during the 2009–10 season.

KING and KONG were the first broadcast partner for Seattle Sounders FC when the club debuted in Major League Soccer in 2009. The stations lost the rights to KCPQ and KZJO in 2014.

In 2017, after KIRO-TV discontinued its 31-year-old tradition of full-day coverage of the H1 Unlimited Seafair Cup, full-day coverage of the races moved to KONG the next year as part of a partnership with SWX Right Now. The station later acquired the rights to the Seafair-organized Independence Day fireworks show on Lake Union.

KONG returned to major league sports broadcasts by way of two deals announced in April 2024. One deal made KONG the home of Seattle Reign FC women's soccer, with a local TV schedule of 11 matches. The second made KONG the flagship of the Kraken Hockey Network, airing all non-nationally televised Seattle Kraken hockey games starting in the 2024–25 season, replacing Root Sports Northwest. The games are syndicated to other stations across the team's media market and streaming on Amazon Prime Video.

In November 2025, KONG acquired a package of six Seattle Torrent games for their inaugural season in the Professional Women's Hockey League (PWHL); the remaining games would air on KZJO.

KONG airs weekly magazine shows for the Seattle Seahawks (Seahawks Central, aired on KONG since 2022) and Kraken (Kraken Home Ice).

== Technical information and subchannels ==
KONG is broadcast from a transmitter in the Queen Anne neighborhood of Seattle. It is one of two ATSC 3.0 (NextGen TV) stations in the Seattle area, having switched to 3.0 transmission on December 15, 2020. The station's ATSC 1.0 channels are carried on the multiplexed signals of other Seattle television stations:

Subchannels provided by KONG (ATSC 1.0)
Subchannel	Res.	Short name	Programming	ATSC 1.0 host
16.1	720p	KONG-HD	Independent	KING-TV
16.2	480i	TCN	True Crime Network → Antenna TV (soon)	KZJO
16.3	480i	ShopLC	Shop LC	KCPQ

In return, KONG's ATSC 3.0 signal broadcasts KING as well as KCPQ and KZJO:

Subchannels of KONG (ATSC 3.0)
Subchannel	Res.	Short name	Programming
5.1	1080p	KING	NBC (KING-TV)
13.1	720p	KCPQ	Fox (KCPQ)
16.1	1080p	KONG	Independent (KONG)
22.1	720p	KZJO	MyNetworkTV (KZJO)

Subchannel broadcast with digital rights management

== See also ==
- Channel 6 branded TV stations in the United States
- Channel 16 virtual TV stations in the United States
- Channel 31 digital TV stations in the United States
