= Greg Palmer =

American journalist

- Born: 1947; Seattle, Washington, United States
- Died: May 8, 2009 (aged 61–62)
- Occupations: writer, television producer, reporter
- Known for: worked at and freelanced for several Seattle broadcasters and newspapers
- Notable work: "The Perilous Fight: America's World War II in Color"
- Spouse: Cathryn Crosetto Palmer (m. 1969)
- Children: 2 sons

Greg Palmer (May 1947 – May 8, 2009) was an American writer and Emmy Award-winning television producer and reporter. Greg Palmer was born in Seattle and raised on Mercer Island near Seattle, WA in May 1947 to attorney Harvard Palmer and his wife Gertrude, a homemaker.

Greg Palmer died on May 8, 2009, of lung cancer.

Greg Palmer worked at and freelanced for several Seattle broadcasters and newspapers, including KING-TV, KCTS-TV, Crosscut, Seattle Weekly and The Seattle Times.

== Television and video productions ==
- "Death: The Trip of a Lifetime"
- "Vaudeville: An American Masters Special"
- Snow White and the Seven Dwarfs (1987)
- The Falcon (1990)
- "The Perilous Fight: America's World War II in Color" (2004)

== Plays ==
- "The Falcon"
- "Puss in Boots"
- "Betsey Green the Mushroom Queen"
- "Snow White and Family Dwarf"

== Bibliography ==
- Palmer, Greg (1993), Death: The Trip of a Lifetime, Harpercollins, ISBN 0-06-250802-4
- Palmer, Greg (2005), Adventures in the Mainstream: Coming Of Age With Down Syndrome, Woodbine House, ISBN 1-890627-30-5
- Palmer, Greg (2008), Cheese Deluxe: A Memoir, Bennett & Hastings, ISBN 978-1-934733-36-3
- University Press of Kansas The GI's Rabbi (2004), Edited by Greg Palmer and Mark S. Zaid, ISBN 978-0-7006-1356-4
