= David Rigsbee =

American poet (born 1949)

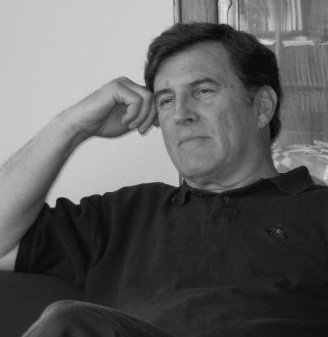
- Born: April 1, 1949 (age 77)
- Education: University of Virginia; Hollins University
- Occupations: Poet; Editor; Book Reviewer; Academic
- Spouse(s): Jill Hamilton Bullitt (divorced); Liz Rigsbee
- Children: 1

David Rigsbee (April 1, 1949) is an American poet, contributing editor and regular book reviewer for The Cortland Review, and literary critic. He served on the faculty at University of Mount Olive.

== Career ==
Rigsbee is the author of 20 books and chapbooks, including eleven full-length poetry collections. In addition to his poems, he has also published critical works on Carolyn Kizer and Joseph Brodsky. He has coedited two anthologies, including Invited Guest: An Anthology of Twentieth Century Southern Poetry, which was a ‘notable book’ selection of the American Library Association and the American Association of University Professors, and was featured on C-Span's Booknotes program. His work has appeared in many journals, including AGNI, American Poetry Review, the Georgia Review, the Iowa Review, the New Yorker, the Ohio Review, Poetry, Prairie Schooner, Sewanee Review, and the Southern Review.

He served on the faculty at University of Mount Olive

Winner of a 2012 Pushcart Prize, the 2009 Black River Poetry Prize, the Vachel Lindsay Poetry Award and the Pound Prize, Rigsbee was also 2010 winner of the Sam Ragan Award for contribution to the arts in North Carolina, as well as winner of the Oscar Young Award for the best book by a North Carolina author (for The Red Tower: New and Selected Poems, 2010) and the Black River Chapbook Poetry Prize for 2009. He has received two creative writing fellowships from the NEA, as well as fellowships from the NEH, the Fine Arts Work Center in Provincetown, and the Virginia Commission on the Arts. He has also received residencies from the Djerassi Foundation and Jentel Foundation.

Rigsbee's most recent books are a collection of essays on contemporary poetry, Not Alone in My Dancing: Essays and Reviews, published by Black Lawrence Press in 2016 and This Much I Can Tell You, also by Black Lawrence Press, in 2017.

== Personal life ==
Rigsbee was married to artist Jill Bullitt, the daughter of poet Carolyn Kizer, for eighteen years before they divorced. He is now married to his wife Liz. He has one daughter.

== Publications ==
=== Books ===
- "This Much I Can Tell You (poems), Black Lawrence Press, 2017
- "Not Alone in My Dancing: Essays and Reviews" (criticism) Black Lawrence Press, 2016
- "School of the Americas" (poems) Black Lawrence Press, 2012
- "The Red Tower: New and Selected Poems" (poems) NewSouth Books
- Two Estates (poems) Cherry Grove Collections, 2009
- Cloud Journal (poems) Turning Point Books, 2008
- The Dissolving Island (poems) BkMk Press, University of Missouri at Kansas City, 2003
- Invited Guest: An Anthology of Twentieth Century Southern Poetry University of Virginia Press, 2001
- Styles of Ruin: Joseph Brodsky and the Postmodernist Elegy (criticism) Greenwood Press, 1999
- A Skeptic's Notebook: Longer Poems St. Andrews Press, 1997
- Trailers (prose) The University of Virginia Press, 1996
- Your Heart Will Fly Away (poems) The Smith, 1992
- An Answering Music: On the Poetry of Carolyn Kizer (criticism) Ford-Brown & Co., 1990
- The Hopper Light (poems) L'Epervier Press, 1988
- The Ardis Anthology of New American Poetry Ardis, 1977
- Stamping Ground (poems) Ardis Publishers, 1976

=== Chapbooks, Broadsides, and Miscellaneous ===
- "The Pilot House (poems) Black Lawrence Press, 2009
- Seen From Above, catalogue, Philip Govedare (painter), Francine Cedars Gallery, Seattle, 2008
- Sonnets to Hamlet Pudding House, 2004
- Greatest Hits: 1975 - 2000 Pudding House, 2001
- Scenes on an Obelisk Pudding House, 2000
- To Be Here Coraddi Chapbook, 1980
- "Only Heaven," Willow Springs Broadsheet, 1993
- “Crickets,” Georgia Review broadside, 1985
- Poetry-in-Motion #7, Nobodaddy Press, 1977

=== Translations ===
- Collected Poems in English. 2000 by Joseph Brodsky (poems translated with others), edited by Ann Kjellberg, Farrar, Straus & Giroux, 2000
- A Part of Speech by Joseph Brodsky, Farrar, Straus & Giroux,1980
- Poems of Mikhail Lermontov in Russian Romanticism Ardis, 1984
