= Denis Hayes =

American environmentalist

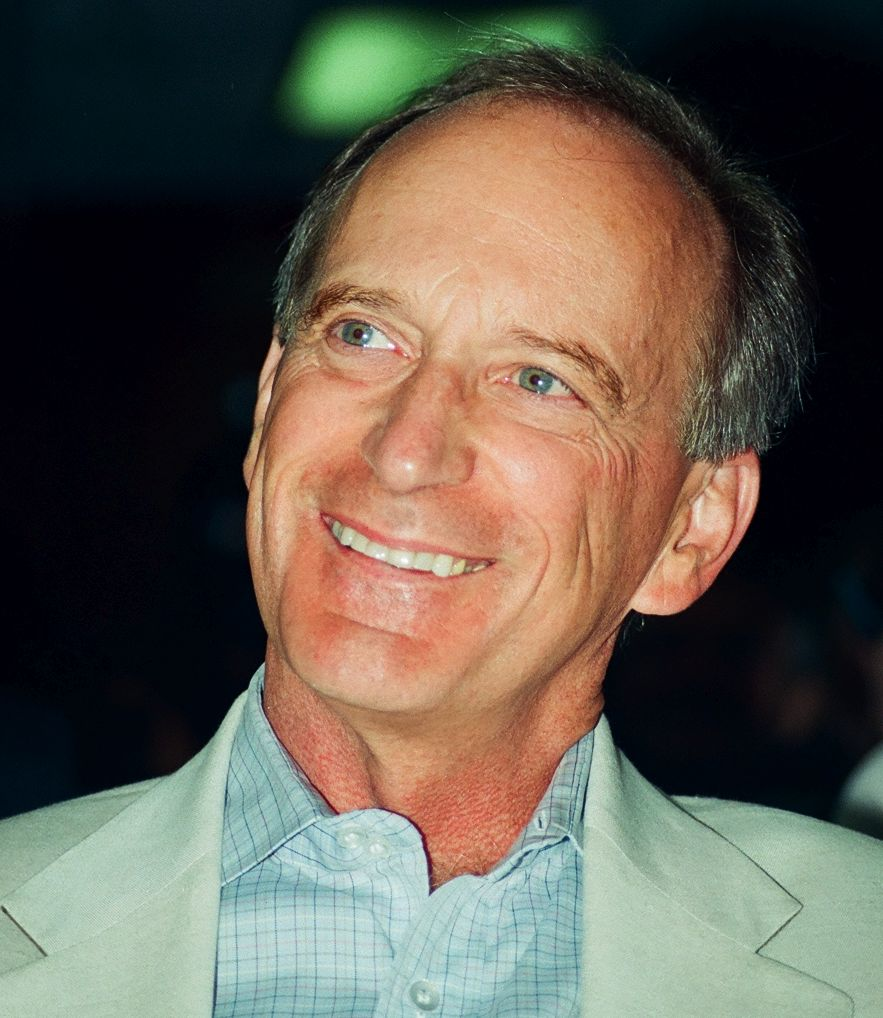
- Hayes in 2000
- Born: Denis Allen Hayes; August 29, 1944 (age 82); Wisconsin, United States
- Education: Stanford University; Harvard Kennedy School; Stanford Law School
- Occupation: Environmental advocate
- Known for: Coordinating the first Earth Day, founding the Earth Day Network, construction of the Bullitt Center

Denis Allen Hayes (born August 29, 1944) is an environmental advocate and an advocate for solar power. He rose to prominence in 1970 as the coordinator for the first Earth Day.

Hayes founded the Earth Day Network and expanded it to more than 180 nations. During the Carter administration, Hayes became head of the Solar Energy Research Institute (now known as the National Renewable Energy Laboratory), but left this position when the Reagan administration cut funding for the program.

Since 1992, Hayes has been president of the Bullitt Foundation in Washington and continues to be a leader in environmental and energy policy.

He is also the author of Cowed: The Hidden Impact of 93 Million Cows on America's Health, Economy, Politics, Culture, and Environment and Rays of Hope.

Hayes has received the national Jefferson Awards Medal for Outstanding Public Service as well as many other awards. Time magazine named him a "Hero of the Planet" in 1999.

== Early life and education ==
Denis Hayes was born in Wisconsin in 1944, but mainly raised in the small town of Camas, Washington, where in 2007 the Hayes Freedom High School was named in his honor. His experiences growing up in the Pacific Northwest instilled a lifelong love of nature. His father worked at a paper mill on the Columbia River, where both the discharges from the mill and the lack of worker protections showed Hayes the impact of industrialization on both people and the environment.

In 1964, Hayes graduated from Clark Community College in Vancouver, Washington. Hayes received his undergraduate degree in history from Stanford University, where he was president of the student body and an activist against the Vietnam War. During those years, he spent significant time backpacking to remote corners of the world. Hayes later enrolled at the Harvard Kennedy School at Harvard University, although he eventually was graduated from Stanford Law School.

== Earth Day ==
He left Harvard after being selected by Senator Gaylord Nelson to organize the first Earth Day. The first Earth Day (April 22, 1970) had participants and celebrants in two thousand colleges and universities, about ten thousand primary and secondary schools, and hundreds of communities. It is believed that some 20 million demonstrators participated. In 2009, the story of Earth Day was told in the film Earth Days which closed that year's Sundance Film Festival.

Following the success of the first Earth Day, Hayes founded the Earth Day Network and served as international chairman for Earth Day's anniversaries in 1990 and 2000. Internationally, he is recognized for expanding the Earth Day Network to more than 180 nations. It is now the world’s most widely observed secular holiday. Hayes continues to chair the board of the international Earth Day Network and is the Chair of the Earth Day 2010 Global Advisory Committee. Earth Day celebrated its 50th anniversary in April 2020, and marked the day with environmental activism across the globe [www.earthdaynetwork.org].

== Career ==
During the Carter administration, Hayes became head of the Solar Energy Research Institute (now known as the National Renewable Energy Laboratory), but left this position when the Reagan administration cut funding for the program. Hayes went back to school and completed a Juris Doctor degree at Stanford Law School, and went on to become an adjunct professor of engineering in that university and litigator with law firm Cooley Godward.

Since 1992, Hayes has been president of the Bullitt Foundation in Seattle, Washington and continues to be a leader in environmental and energy policy. By mobilizing the resources of The Bullitt Foundation, Hayes intends to make the Pacific Northwest educated, environmentally aware and a progressive corner of America—a global model for sustainable development. He is currently overseeing construction of The Bullitt Center, expected to be the most energy-efficient commercial building in the world, firmly planting Seattle at the forefront of the green building movement. The goal of the Bullitt Center is to change the way buildings are designed, built and operated to improve long-term environmental performance and promote broader implementation of energy efficiency, renewable energy and other green building technologies in the Northwest. The building is seeking to meet the ambitious goals of the Living Building Challenge, the world’s most strenuous benchmark for sustainability. For example, a solar array will generate as much electricity as the building uses and rain will supply as much water, with all wastewater treated onsite. Also in Seattle are Hayes' wife, Gail Boyer Hayes (daughter of Paul D. Boyer), and daughter, Lisa A. Hayes, a lawyer defending the Northshore United Church of Christ regarding Tent City 4 (King County, Washington).

Over Hayes' career, he has been a visiting scholar at the Woodrow Wilson Center in Washington, DC and at the Bellagio Center in Italy, a senior fellow at the Worldwatch Institute, an adjunct professor of engineering at Stanford University, a Richard von Weizsäcker Fellow of the Bosch Foundation, a Silicon Valley lawyer at the Cooley Firm, and author. He has served on dozens of governing boards, including those of Stanford University, the World Resources Institute, the Federation of American Scientists, The Energy Foundation, Children Now, the National Programming Council for Public Television, the American Solar Energy Society, Greenpeace, CERES, and the Environmental Grantmakers Association.

== Awards ==
Hayes has received the national Jefferson Awards Medal for Outstanding Public Service, as well as the highest awards bestowed by the Sierra Club, The Humane Society of the United States, the National Wildlife Federation, the Natural Resources Council of America, the Global Environmental Facility of the World Bank, the Interfaith Center on Corporate Responsibility, and the American Solar Energy Society. He was featured in the 2009 documentary film Earth Days. Time has named him "Hero of the Planet."

Hayes was selected by Engineering News-Record as one of the Top 25 Newsmakers of 2014 for using biomimicry in the development of the Bullitt Center. In 2020, Hayes received a Trailblazer Award from Verdical Group at their annual Net Zero Conference.
