= King Videocable =

American cable television company

King Videocable was a broadcast cable television company based in Seattle, Washington. It was owned by the King Broadcasting Company, then-owners of Seattle television station KING-TV, and by investment firm Kelso and Company. Launched in the early 1970s by King Broadcasting employee Edward Hewson, it eventually expanded to cover around 500,000 customers, with systems stretching from Los Angeles to Minneapolis.

After the King Broadcasting assets were sold largely to the Providence Journal Company in 1992, KVC was integrated into PJC's existing cable holdings, including Colony Communications. PJC sold their cable assets, including KVC, to Continental Cablevision in 1995. These systems subsequently became MediaOne, AT&T Broadband, and ultimately Comcast.
