= National Mobile Television =

Corporation

National Mobile Television (NMT) was a Los Angeles–based television broadcasting industry corporation that operated a fleet of mobile television units.

Then known as Northwest Mobile Television, NMT was founded by Stan Carlson and Stimson Bullitt in 1968 and operated as a division of the King Broadcasting Company in Seattle, Washington. In 1992 when King was sold to the Providence Journal, NMT was spun off as an independent entity. It was acquired by Oaktree Capital Management in 1997.

On March 23, 2009, NMT went into receivership and closed its doors.

== See also ==
- Outside broadcasting
