= KSTW =

Television station in Tacoma, Washington

- Tacoma–Seattle, Washington; United States
- City: Tacoma, Washington
- Channels: Digital: 11 (VHF); Virtual: 11
- Branding: Seattle 11

Programming
- Affiliations: 11.1: Independent; for others, see § Subchannels

Ownership
- Owner: CBS Television Stations; (The CW Television Stations Inc.)

History
- First air date: March 1, 1953
- Former call signs: KTNT-TV (1953–1974)
- Former channel numbers: Analog: 11 (VHF, 1953–2009); Digital: 36 (UHF, 2002–2009)
- Former affiliations: CBS (1953–1958, 1960–1962, 1995–1997); DuMont (secondary, 1953–1955); Independent (1958–1960, 1962–1995); NBC (secondary, 1967–1969); UPN (1997–2006); The CW (2006–2023)
- Call sign meaning: Seattle–Tacoma, Washington

Technical information
- Licensing authority: FCC
- Facility ID: 23428
- ERP: 100 kW
- HAAT: 275.7 m (905 ft)
- Transmitter coordinates: 47°36′55″N 122°18′33″W

Links
- Public license information: Public file; LMS
- Website: www.seattle11.com

KSTW (channel 11), branded as Seattle 11, is an independent television station licensed to Tacoma, Washington, United States, serving the Seattle area. Owned by the CBS Television Stations group, the station maintains its transmitter on East Madison Street in Seattle's Cherry Hill neighborhood, and its offices are located in the Westlake neighborhood, just north of downtown.

As the first station to sign on in Tacoma (and second in the Seattle metropolitan area overall), KSTW initially signed on in March 1953 as KTNT-TV, the area's CBS affiliate under the ownership of the Tacoma News Tribune. The station lost the affiliation when Seattle-licensed KIRO-TV signed on in 1958; both stations shared the affiliation for two years after their owners agreed to settle an antitrust lawsuit over the switch. The station became KSTW in 1974 when it was acquired by a forerunner of Gaylord Broadcasting; it subsequently became one of the strongest independent stations in the country over two decades, reaching regional superstation status with widespread carriage on cable television systems in Washington and neighboring states/provinces. KSTW rejoined CBS in 1995 during a nationwide affiliation shuffle; two years later, the station became a UPN affiliate via a three-way deal involving it and KIRO-TV, which led it to join The CW when UPN shut down in 2006, carrying the network's programming until 2023, when CBS withdrew its eight affiliates from the network after selling its ownership stake to Nexstar Media Group.

KSTW is available on Canadian cable systems in southwestern British Columbia and Vancouver Island, on providers such as Rogers Cable and Telus Optik TV in Vancouver, Victoria, Nanaimo, Kamloops, Kelowna and Penticton.

== History ==
=== Early history ===
The construction permit for the station was issued by the Federal Communications Commission (FCC) on December 10, 1952. Chief Engineer Max Bice immediately ordered equipment through General Electric, and the equipment was delivered within 45 days. The transmitter arrived in Tacoma from Syracuse, New York, on February 9, 1953. It was installed on the next day, and work progressed rapidly. The original studios and transmitter house were located at South 11th Street and South Grant Avenue. The station tested with a 30,000-watt signal and received reports of reception from up to 150 miles (240 km) away.

The station began broadcasting March 1, 1953, in Tacoma as KTNT-TV, named after its founder, the Tacoma News Tribune. At the time, it was a primary CBS affiliate and sister station to KTNT radio (AM 1400, now KITZ, and FM 97.3, now KIRO-FM). During the late 1950s, the station was briefly affiliated with the NTA Film Network. On February 21, 1954, KTNT received permission from the FCC to increase the transmitter's power to 316,000 watts, and to move the transmitter to a new 1,000-foot (300 m) tower near View Park, Washington just south of Harper on the Fragaria Access Road. Parts of the old transmitting equipment were loaned to Portland, Oregon's KGW-TV, due to the damage from the Columbus Day Storm of 1962.

In February 1958, KIRO-TV (channel 7) took to the air as the Seattle–Tacoma market's exclusive CBS affiliate. After being informed by CBS that its affiliation would be discontinued, KTNT-TV filed an antitrust lawsuit against CBS and KIRO-TV, on claims the network had a pre-existing agreement to affiliate with KIRO-TV when and if it ever went on the air. CBS agreed to settle the suit in 1960 by taking on both KIRO-TV and KTNT-TV as primary affiliates. This arrangement lasted until September 1962, when channel 7 became the sole CBS station for western Washington. Channel 11 was left to once again become an independent station, the second in the market after KTVW (channel 13, now KCPQ).

During the late 1960s, the station also occasionally carried NBC prime time programs preempted by Seattle SuperSonics games on KING-TV (channel 5). For one month, in May 1967, the station was also an affiliate of the United Network (also known as the Overmyer Network), a short-lived attempt to create a fourth commercial television network nationally. During the decade, KTNT also presented horror movies under the Nightmare! banner in the early 1960s on Saturday nights, airing around 10:30 p.m. before sign-off.

=== New ownership ===
Due to new newspaper-broadcast cross-ownership restrictions enacted by the FCC in the early 1970s, the Tacoma News Tribune's ownership of the KTNT stations were under threat of potential FCC divestiture. As a result, KTNT-TV was sold to the WKY Television System, forerunner of Gaylord Broadcasting (now Ryman Hospitality Properties), in 1974; the new ownership changed the station's call letters to KSTW (standing for Seattle–Tacoma, Washington) on March 1. With the new ownership and call letters came a new slogan, "Good Lookin' 11", as well as a new logo—a stylized "circle 11" with the circle modified to accommodate the "11". Later in the decade, KSTW became a regional superstation. At its height, it was available on nearly every cable system in Washington, as well as parts of Oregon, northern Idaho, and much of British Columbia. The station also carried many daytime CBS programs preempted by KIRO-TV (including game shows such as The Joker's Wild and The Price Is Right) during the 1970s. From 1976 to 1979, John Lippman worked at KSTW, building a news department.

During the late 1980s, KSTW branded on-air as "KSTWashington" and, as it did in the 1960s and 1970s, ran the traditional fare of cartoons, off-network sitcoms, westerns, old movies, and a local 10 p.m. newscast. It was also the over-the-air home of the Seattle Mariners and SuperSonics. Although it was one of the strongest independent stations in the country, it passed on the Fox affiliation when that network launched in 1986; that affiliation was picked up by KCPQ. This was mainly because most of the smaller markets in KSTW's cable footprint had enough stations to provide a local Fox affiliate, making the prospect of KSTW as a multi-market Fox affiliate unattractive to Gaylord.

In 1993, Gaylord agreed to affiliate KSTW, and its sister stations KTVT in Fort Worth, WVTV in Milwaukee and KHTV in Houston, with the new WB Television Network, at that time projected to launch late in the summer of 1994. However, delays in the network's launch led to Gaylord suing to void the affiliation agreements in July 1994, which was followed a month later by a breach of contract countersuit by The WB. In the meantime, CBS found itself without an affiliate in Dallas–Fort Worth when its longtime affiliate there, KDFW, switched to Fox (it was later purchased outright by that network). CBS approached Gaylord for an affiliation with KTVT. Gaylord agreed, on condition that KSTW be included as part of the deal. CBS agreed, partly because at the time, KSTW was the only non-Big Three station in Seattle with a fully functioning news department.

As a result, CBS returned to channel 11 on March 13, 1995, in what was to have been a ten-year affiliation agreement. (Some CBS shows that were preempted by KIRO, such as The Bold and the Beautiful, had already been shown on KSTW starting in the fall of 1994, which was already occurring with KTVT.) The WB ultimately signed with KTZZ-TV (channel 22, now KZJO) weeks before its eventual January 1995 launch. With the CBS affiliation, KSTW was dropped from cable systems in areas of Eastern Washington and Northern Idaho, due to the presence of Spokane's KREM-TV. Even as a CBS affiliate, KSTW still ran a number of off-network sitcoms, and initially only programmed two half-hour newscasts, at 6 and 11 p.m. Although it carried an 11 p.m. newscast throughout its run with the network, daytime newscasts aired in various timeslots during KSTW's third tenure with CBS, eventually settling at 6 a.m., 11 a.m. and 4 p.m. KSTW used the same vertically parallelogrammed "11" logo and on-air branding as its Dallas sister station KTVT during this time.

The station was put up for sale in October 1996, with Gaylord stating in its earnings report that "its financial results have not met expectations." On January 20, 1997, Gaylord announced that KSTW would be purchased by Cox Broadcasting, a subsidiary of Cox Enterprises, for $160 million. The deal was finalized on May 30, 1997 (Gaylord held on to KTVT until 1999, when it was sold to CBS outright). Cox had plans to expand the news department at KSTW and make it more competitive with the other stations in the market. However, rival KIRO-TV had been put up for sale just weeks before KSTW, as the Belo Corporation's merger with the Providence Journal Company gave it ownership of KING-TV (Belo could not hold on to both KING-TV and KIRO per FCC ownership rules at the time).

Paramount Stations Group, meanwhile, was in the process of selling off the non-UPN stations it had inherited from Viacom, including KMOV in St. Louis—Paramount and Chris-Craft Industries launched UPN in January 1995, the same month The WB went on the air. As a result, on February 20, 1997, a three-way station trade was arranged, in which Paramount/Viacom would swap KMOV to Belo for KIRO-TV, which would then be dealt to Cox in exchange for KSTW and $70 million—a deal that came as a shock to KSTW employees. The two Seattle stations retained their respective syndicated programming, but exchanged network affiliations once again, with KSTW becoming a UPN affiliate, and KIRO returning to CBS. The deal was finalized on June 2, 1997. About 50 people would lose their jobs at the station.

KSTW began to air UPN programming on June 30, 1997, along with sitcoms, movies, cartoons, a few first-run syndicated shows, and the return of the 10 p.m. newscast it had prior to the CBS switch. The station canceled the 10 p.m. newscast in December 1998. Viacom acquired CBS (its former parent) in 2000, bringing CBS and KSTW under common ownership, and making KSTW and the aforementioned KTVT sister stations once again. The cartoons on KSTW had disappeared (as a result of UPN ending the Disney's One Too block in August 2003), and more first-run syndicated talk and reality shows moved to KSTW. In July 2001, KSTW moved their studios from Tacoma to Renton; despite the move, KSTW remains licensed to Tacoma to this day.

=== CW affiliation ===
Former logo as CW 11 from 2012 to 2023.

On January 24, 2006, Time Warner and KSTW parent CBS Corporation (which split from Viacom the previous month; the two would remerge in December 2019) announced they would shut down The WB and UPN, and launch The CW Television Network, which would largely feature programming from both networks; KSTW was announced as the Seattle station for the new network; the station rebranded as "CW 11" on August 11, ahead of the network's launch on September 18, 2006. Tribune Company-owned WB station KTWB-TV (later KMYQ, now KZJO) became an affiliate of MyNetworkTV.

In November 2006, after cost-cutting measures were put in place by CBS, it was announced that KSTW would become a "hosting station", with master control located at the facilities of the company's San Francisco duopoly of KPIX and KBCW.

=== Return to independence ===
On October 3, 2022, Nexstar Media Group acquired majority ownership of The CW. Under the agreement, CBS was given the right to pull its affiliations from KSTW and its seven other CW stations. On May 5, 2023, CBS announced that it would exercise that right and KSTW would cease airing The CW's programming at the end of August and become an independent station. The CW affiliation in Seattle went first to the 4.2 subchannel of KOMO-TV, then to KUNS-TV on January 1, 2024.

== Programming ==
=== Sports ===
The station was the on-air home for the NBA's Seattle SuperSonics in the early 1970s, and again from the early 1990s until 1999. It also aired Seattle Mariners games for most of the 1980s, 1990s and 2000s. The station also carried TVS' World Football League telecasts in 1974. The station also carried the NASL Seattle Sounders from 1974 to 1981 and the MISL Tacoma Stars from 1984 to 1986.

After the departure of the SuperSonics, the Portland Trail Blazers announced on November 25, 2025, that it would air 20 games of its then-current season on KSTW via the Rip City Television Network, with the first game airing the following day; this was in addition to the 18 games already planned for broadcast in the Seattle market via KUNS-TV.

=== Children's programming ===
From 1954 to 1974, KTNT's local children's programs featured a personable host named "Brakeman Bill" McLain. From 1988 to 1994, the station carried Ranger Charlie's Kids Club, the last children's show in the region to be filmed before a live audience. The show featured a forest ranger accompanied by a puppet raccoon named Rosco; the show won an Emmy Award. Looney Tunes and Woody Woodpecker cartoons were incorporated into the show.

=== Newscasts ===
KTNT/KSTW has offered local newscasts throughout most of its history. Its news department began when the station signed on in 1953 as a CBS affiliate. In 1976, KSTW moved its 11 p.m. newscast to a prime time slot at 10 p.m. In May 1990, the station debuted an 11:30 a.m. newscast, which was ended on July 23, 1991, due to low ratings. After KSTW rejoined CBS in March 1995, the station made extensive changes to its news schedule: the 10 p.m. newscast moved back to 11 p.m., and newscasts were added in various other timeslots: besides the 11 p.m. news, it initially only ran one other half-hour newscast, at 6 p.m. On July 31, 1995, the station debuted an hour-long 6 a.m. newscast; in early August, the 6 p.m. newscast was dropped due to low ratings in favor of an hour-long 5 p.m. newscast (the CBS Evening News, which originally aired at 5:30, then moved to the 6 p.m. timeslot Seattle stations have traditionally scheduled the network newscasts).

Both newscasts were removed on March 11, 1996, in favor of newscasts at 11 a.m. and 4 p.m. emphasizing health and consumer features. During this time, KSTW was among the first stations to use the 11 at 11 branding on its 11 p.m. newscast (as did Gaylord's station in Dallas–Fort Worth, KTVT, using a modified 11 on 11 branding on its 10 p.m. newscast); this format included the top stories and a weather forecast in an 11-minute first segment, with the next segment serving as an in-depth "Northwest News Extra" report. After being sold to Paramount Stations Group, the station's 11 a.m. and 4 p.m. newscasts were immediately cut. Initial plans for June 9, 1997, included expanding the 11 p.m. newscast (the only newscast to have remained largely unchanged from March 1995) to an hour (pushing the Late Show with David Letterman to midnight) in preparation for its return to the 10 p.m. timeslot, but those plans were retracted and the 11 p.m. newscast remained unchanged with no change to the Late Show start time. The late evening newscast reverted to the 10 p.m. timeslot after the switch to UPN on June 30.

KSTW's news department was shut down on December 4, 1998, as a result of cost-cutting measures mandated by then-parent company Viacom; the move came after the company canceled newscasts on its UPN stations in Tampa–St. Petersburg and Boston. News returned to the station in March 2003, as it began to carry a 10 p.m. newscast produced by KIRO-TV under a news share agreement. The newscast was dropped on December 19, 2003, but returned on June 28, 2004, before being canceled again, this time permanently, in June 2005; from then on until July 2022, the time slot was filled with syndicated programming.

After dropping traditional newscasts, KSTW aired two specially focused news programs on Sunday mornings: the business-focused program, South Sound Business Report (produced by Business Examiner and also broadcast by Tacoma PBS member station KBTC-TV), as well as Northwest Indian News (produced by local cable channel KANU TV-99), which focuses on the Native Americans in the Northwest. In 2013, KSTW debuted a public affairs program on Sunday mornings called The Impact, produced by Washington state's public affairs channel TVW. All of these programs have since gone off the air.

Local newscasts returned to KSTW after 17 years on July 18, 2022, with the debut of Seattle Now News at 10 on CW11, which was produced by CBS News and Stations. The newscast lasted just over a year, ending on August 31, 2023, as the station transitioned to independent status the following day; it was replaced by reruns of The Big Bang Theory and Young Sheldon in its timeslot.

== In popular culture ==
The callsign and channel number for KSTW were co-opted by The CW to create a fictional representation of the station with a news department for the Seattle-set iZombie (which aired from 2015 to 2019), though not with "CW 11" branding, but retaining the station's callsign font, and a completely different image from that of the real KSTW.

== Technical information ==
=== Subchannels ===
The station's signal is multiplexed:

Subchannels of KSTW
Subchannel	Res.	Short name	Programming
11.1	1080i	KSTW-HD	Main KSTW programming
11.2	480i	START	Start TV
11.3	480i	OUTLAW	Outlaw (4:3)
11.4	480i	DABL	Dabl
11.5	480i	MSGOLD	MovieSphere Gold
11.6	480i	HSN	HSN

=== Analog-to-digital conversion ===
KSTW shut down its analog signal, over VHF channel 11, at noon on June 12, 2009, as part of the federally mandated transition from analog to digital television. The station's digital signal relocated from its pre-transition UHF channel 36 to VHF channel 11.

=== Former translators ===
KSTW no longer has any over-the-air translators. KSTW's last remaining translator, analog translator K62FS (channel 62) in Port Townsend, was permanently shut down on December 29, 2011. The FCC required that all television transmitters occupying channels 52 to 69 to vacate those channels by December 31, 2011. KSTW had already applied to change the broadcast channel and to broadcast in digital so as to use channel 51; however, on August 21, 2011, the FCC issued a freeze on processing applications to use channel 51; that channel would eventually be removed for TV use as part of the spectrum incentive auction. According to an online posting by KSTW, there are no other channels on which this translator can broadcast in digital, resulting in the permanent shutdown of the transmitter. KSTW also had low-power translators serving certain areas of Seattle, all of which have been shut down.
