= Bullitt Foundation =

Charitable organization in Seattle, Washington

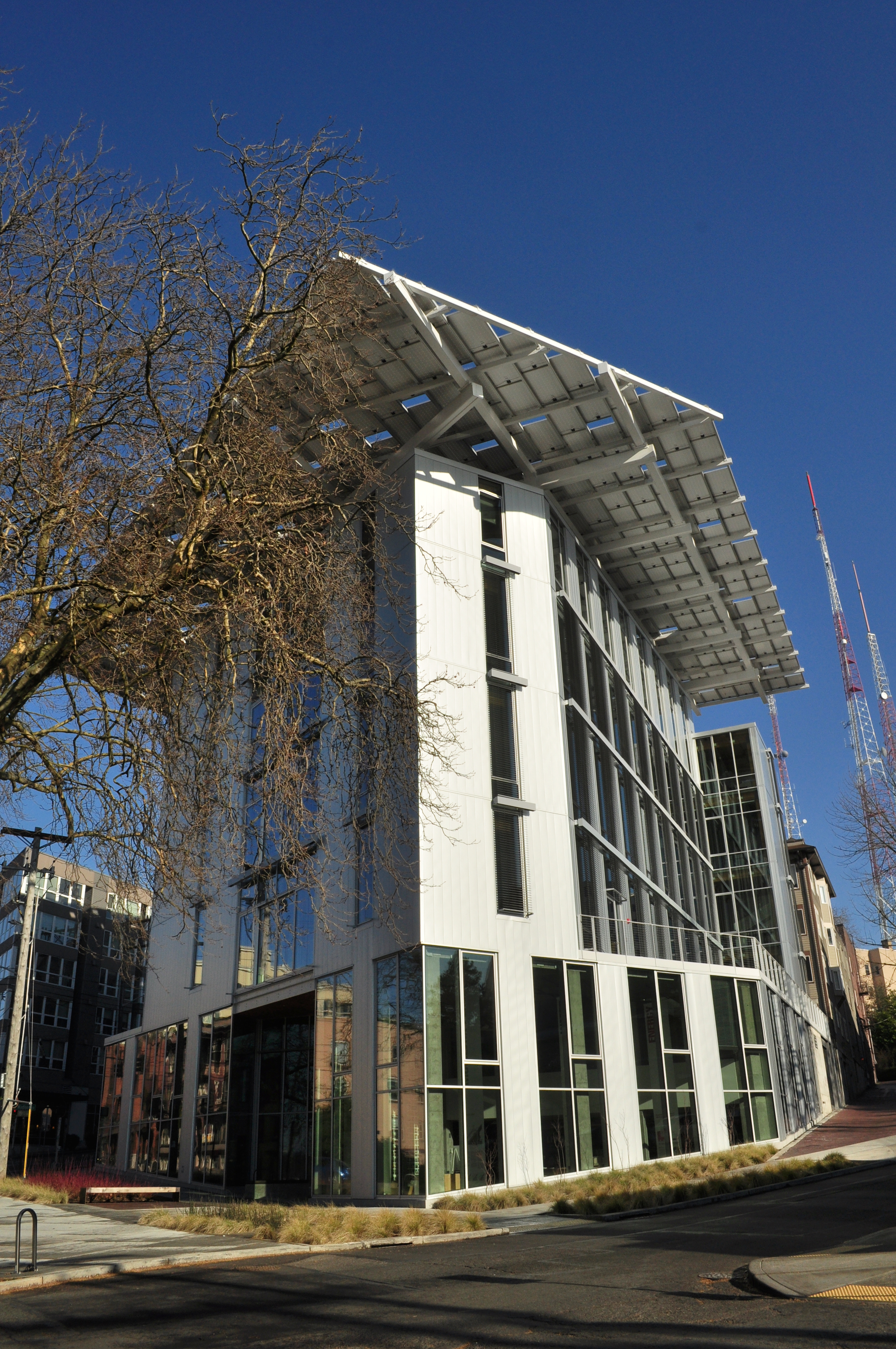
- Founded: 1952
- Founder: Dorothy Bullitt
- Location: Seattle, Washington
- Key people: Denis Hayes, President and CEO
- Revenue: $2,528,093 (2017)
- Expenses: $8,579,196 (2017)
- Website: bullitt.org

The Bullitt Foundation is a foundation established in 1952 by Dorothy S. Bullitt, a prominent Seattle businesswoman and philanthropist who founded King Broadcasting Company in Seattle. Its assets as of the end of 2010 were in excess of US$100M.

After Dorothy Bullitt died in 1989, the foundation inherited 28% of the stock from King Broadcasting Company.

In 1992, the Bullitt Foundation hired Denis Hayes, national organizer of the first Earth Day, as President. Soon thereafter, it began to broaden the Board beyond family members and decided to devote the Foundation exclusively to protecting and restoring the environment of the Pacific Northwest. In 2016 it further refined its focus on urban ecology in the “Emerald Corridor” extending from Vancouver, British Columbia to Portland, Oregon.

The Foundation's mission is "to safeguard the natural environment by promoting responsible human activities and sustainable communities in the Pacific Northwest" by making grants to nonprofit organizations.

The Foundation also manages the Bullitt Environmental Prize, which provides $100,000 annually to an exceptional graduate student from a disadvantaged background who shows promise of evolving into a future environmental leader.

In 2009, the Foundation began developing the Bullitt Center, which has been called the "world's greenest office building". The building was completed in April 2013, and was certified as a "Living Building" under the ambitious Living Building Challenge in 2015.

As of June 2019, the board consisted of: Rod Brown (Chair), Harriet Bullitt, Maud Daudon, Mark Edlen, Erim Gomez, Frank Greer, Lisa Graumlich, Denis Hayes, Martha Kongsgaard, Bill Ruckelshaus, and Jessie Woolley-Wilson.
