= KING-FM =

Classical music public radio station in Seattle

- Seattle, Washington; United States
- Broadcast area: Seattle-Tacoma; Puget Sound area
- Frequency: 98.1 MHz (HD Radio)
- Branding: Classical KING

Programming
- Format: Classical music
- Subchannels: HD2: Classical Calm; HD3: Classical Christmas

Ownership
- Owner: Beethoven, a Nonprofit Corporation; (Classic Radio)

History
- First air date: December 1947
- Call sign meaning: King County

Technical information
- Licensing authority: FCC
- Facility ID: 11755
- Class: C
- ERP: 66,000 watts; 68,000 with beam tilt
- HAAT: 707 meters (2,320 ft)
- Transmitter coordinates: 47.504°N 121.976°W

Links
- Public license information: Public file; LMS
- Webcast: Listen live
- Website: www.classicalking.org

KING-FM (98.1 MHz; "Classical KING") is a non-commercial classical music radio station in Seattle, Washington. It is owned by Classic Radio, a nonprofit organization. The studios and offices are on Mercer St in Seattle. KING-FM holds periodic on-air fundraisers to help support the station through listener contributions.

KING-FM's transmitter is located in Issaquah on Tiger Mountain. Its effective radiated power (ERP) is 66,000 watts (68,000 with beam tilt). KING-FM broadcasts in the HD Radio format, using two subchannels for alternate classical programming.

== History ==
=== Early years ===
The station that today is KING-FM first signed on the air in December 1947, originally at 94.9 MHz. It was owned by King Broadcasting, whose co-owner and president was Dorothy Bullitt. The year before, Bullitt had purchased KEVR (1090 AM) and changed it to KING (now KPTR). (Seattle is located in King County, for which its call letters were chosen.)

In 1949, King Broadcasting bought 98.1 KRSC-FM, which had gone on the air in February 1947 under different ownership. KING-FM moved from 94.9 to 98.1 MHz, replacing KRSC-FM. The 94.9 transmitter was donated to Edison Vocational School, which used it to broadcast educational programming on that frequency. In 1958, the 94.9 frequency was taken over by KUOW-FM, owned by the University of Washington, and now a public news-talk station affiliated with NPR.

Concurrent with the purchase of KRSC-FM, King Broadcasting also acquired KRSC-TV (channel 5), which had signed on the previous year. The call letters were changed to KING-TV. The three stations, KING-AM-FM-TV, had their studios and offices at 320 Aurora Avenue North in Seattle.

=== Switch to classical music ===
At first, KING-FM simulcast its AM counterpart. Over time, it began airing classical programs separate from the AM station, and by the late 1960s, it was exclusively a classical outlet, a format that has continued to be broadcast on the station since.

During the late 1970s, KING-FM carried syndicated concert broadcasts by the Philadelphia Orchestra, usually under direction of Eugene Ormandy, the New York Philharmonic, and the Boston Symphony. Many of the syndicated concert programs featured well-known instrumentalists and conductors performing works which they never recorded commercially - e.g. Leonard Bernstein conducting the New York Philharmonic in a highly memorable 1976 reading of Bruckner's Sixth Symphony in A major.

In the mid-1970s, KING-FM's schedule also included specialized programs showcasing Quadraphonic LP recordings and historical recordings. In 1983, KING-FM was the first station in the Seattle area to utilize compact disc (CD) technology for its recordings.

=== Sale to non-profit group ===
In 1992, King Broadcasting was acquired by the parent company of The Providence Journal, a Rhode Island publishing and broadcasting company. While the new ownership wanted the TV station, the radio stations were sold to Classic Radio for $9.75 million. The AM station was, in turn, sold to EZ Communications. KING-FM was run by a non-profit partnership, consisting of the Seattle Opera, Seattle Symphony, and the Arts Fund. Although KING-FM was owned by a non-profit entity, the station continued to operate for a time on a commercial basis, selling advertising as before. Even after the sale, the radio station was co-located with KING-TV for several more years.

Many radio transmitters in the Seattle-Tacoma radio market were moved to surrounding mountains for better reception in Seattle's hilly topography. In 1993, KING-FM relocated its transmitter from Seattle's Queen Anne Hill to Tiger Mountain in Issaquah. A backup transmitter was on nearby Cougar Mountain. This higher-elevation transmitter location provided a significant improvement in KING-FM's reception quality in its listener area. KING-FM also began broadcasting its programming online, becoming one of the first internet radio stations, streamed by RealNetworks c. 1995.

=== Switch to public radio ===
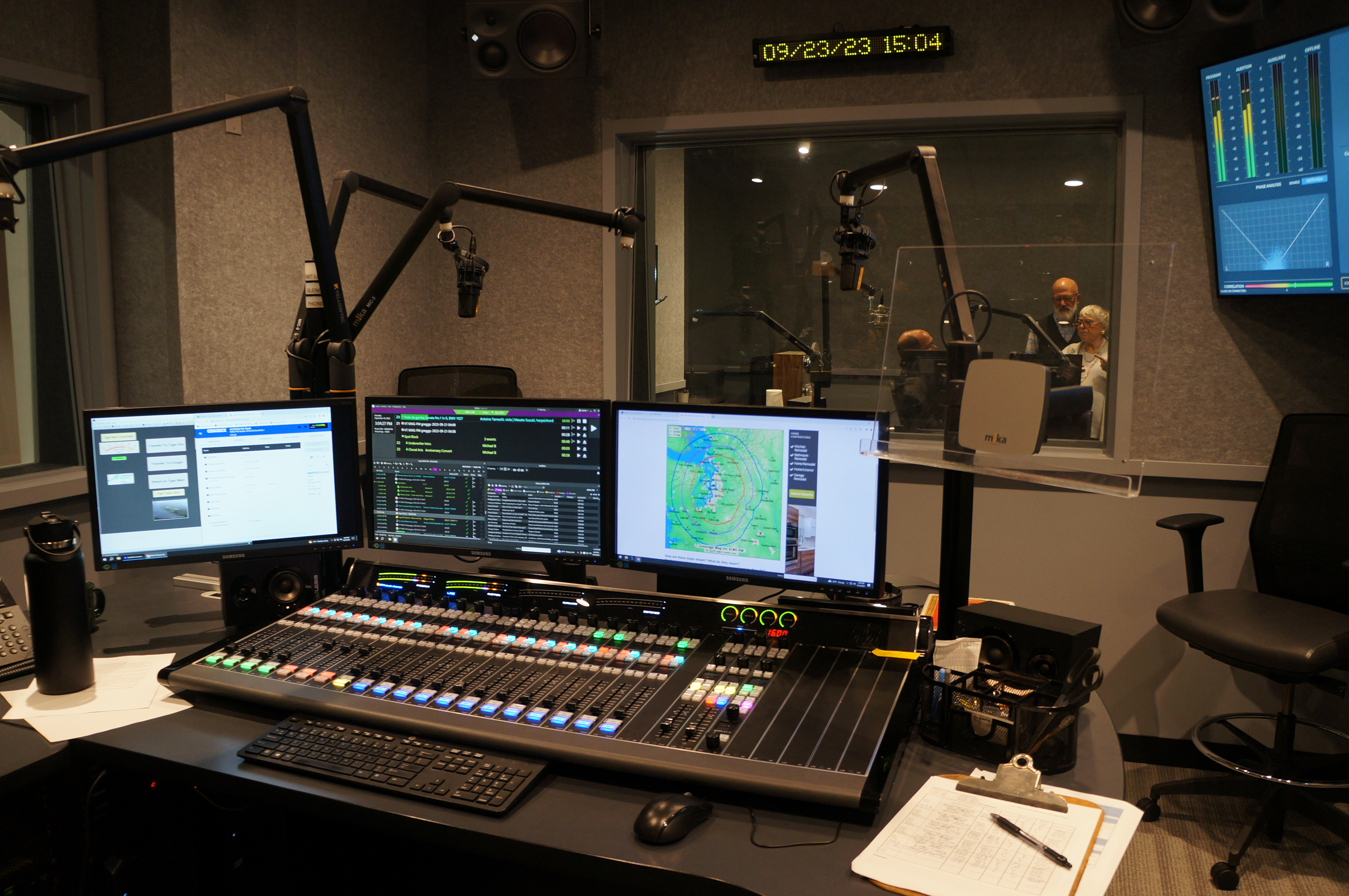
The center recording studio for KING-FM at the Seattle Opera building in Seattle

On March 23, 2010, KING-FM announced that it would transition to a non-commercial, listener-supported public radio station in July 2011, citing reduced advertising revenue. Several other commercial classical radio stations have made similar transitions to public radio status, including WQXR-FM in New York City, WCRB in Boston and KDFC in San Francisco. Successful fundraising efforts led KING-FM to announce on April 7, 2011, that the transition would instead take place on May 2, two months ahead of schedule.

In 2011, KING-FM made the successful transition from a commercial to a non-commercial public radio station. As a listener-supported station, KING-FM has added new programming and added two additional channels of classical music using HD Radio technology. KING-FM is one a handful of non-commercial FM radio stations to broadcast outside the standard band for FM stations of its type (88-92 MHz; it is also one of two such stations in the Seattle market alongside KUOW-FM).

The station relocated its recording studio and offices to the Seattle Opera's Seattle Center building in 2020. In 2022, KING-FM renamed itself Classical KING and changed its logo as a means of reducing perceived elitism. The following year, Classical KING redesigned its website to improve accessibility.
