= Dorothy Bullitt =

American businesswoman and philanthropist

Dorothy Stimson Bullitt
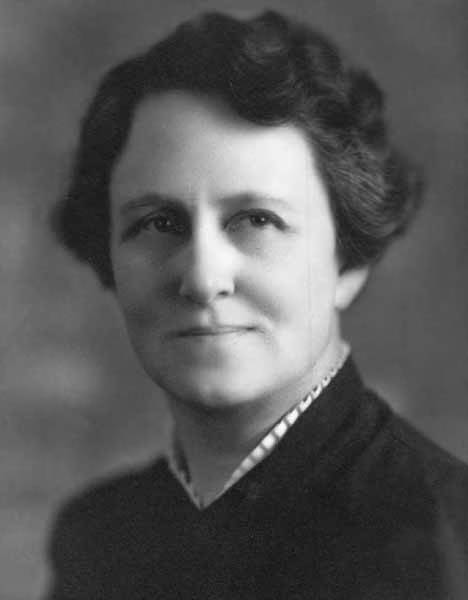
- Born: February 5, 1892; Seattle, Washington, United States
- Died: June 27, 1989 (aged 97); Seattle, Washington, United States
- Resting place: Evergreen Washelli Memorial Park
- Other name: Dorothy Frances Stimson
- Occupations: Broadcaster, realtor, philanthropist
- Title: Founder/President/Chairwoman, King Broadcasting Co. (1946–1977)
- Political party: Democratic
- Spouse(s): A. Scott Bullitt (1877-1932) (1918-1932, his death)
- Children: 3, including Priscilla Bullitt Collins

Dorothy Stimson Bullitt (February 5, 1892 – June 27, 1989) was an American businesswoman and philanthropist. A radio and television pioneer, she founded King Broadcasting Company, a major owner of broadcast stations in Seattle, Washington. She was the first woman in the United States to buy and manage a television station.

== Birth and early life ==
Bullitt was born Dorothy Frances Stimson in Seattle in 1892, four years after Washington became a state, to C. D. Stimson, a lumber and real estate magnate, and his wife Harriet. Wealthy throughout her childhood and early adulthood, in 1918 she married A. Scott Bullitt, a lawyer and aspiring politician 14 years her senior. Scott Bullitt, a member of a prominent Kentucky family, became a prominent Democrat and friend of Franklin D. Roosevelt, and was scheduled to place Roosevelt's name in nomination for the U.S. presidency at the 1932 Democratic National Convention when he died of liver cancer, leaving Dorothy a widow at the age of 40. She attended the convention as a delegate in her late husband's place, and presented a plank outlawing child labor for the party's platform.

After Scott's death, Dorothy Bullitt hired a lawyer and took personal charge of her family's real estate holdings. Her father had bequeathed her a considerable number of properties in downtown Seattle, but it was the height of the Great Depression, and the Bullitt properties were losing lessees rapidly as businesses failed and their owners moved out. Working in the almost exclusively male business world, and despite knowing next to nothing about real estate at the time of her husband's death, Bullitt personally restored the family's real estate business to financial health. An increasingly prominent member of Seattle's business community, Bullitt became a member of a number of corporate boards and a regent of the University of Washington, and was named Seattle's First Citizen in 1959.

== King Broadcasting ==
In 1947, Bullitt bought a small AM radio station, KEVR. She immediately applied to the Federal Communications Commission to change the station's call letters to KING (for King County, Washington), but KING was already registered to an old merchant ship, the SS Watertown. Undaunted, Bullitt negotiated with the freighter's owner and acquired the letters. (According to legend, Bullitt personally rowed out to the freighter with a bottle of champagne to meet the captain, who didn't care what call letters he used and asked only that Bullitt make a donation to his church.) The following year, Bullitt received a license for an FM station, KING-FM, and used it to broadcast classical music, her favorite.

In 1949, Bullitt purchased an eight-month-old television station, KRSC-TV, and renamed it KING-TV. As the only television station in the Northwest, KING had its choice of programming from all four networks, NBC, CBS, DuMont, and ABC. But as more stations came on the air following the lifting of the FCC's construction freeze, they peeled away KING's network affiliations, leaving KING with the then-poor-performing ABC. KING-TV became an NBC station in 1959 after Bullitt persuaded the more successful network to switch its affiliation from rival station KOMO-TV. KING-TV remains an NBC affiliate today.

Bullitt turned the presidency of King Broadcasting, as the company was called, over to her son Charles Stimson "Stim" Bullitt in 1961, remaining on the board as chairperson for several years thereafter. Dorothy and Stimson both believed strongly that the stations of King Broadcasting should serve the public, and not just be driven by ratings and revenue. At Bullitt's insistence, KING-TV built one of the first local TV news operations in the country, and through the 1950s and 1960s the station's news programming earned a national reputation for quality, on the strength of its locally produced documentaries and tough investigative journalism. Through the influence of the Bullitts and King Broadcasting executive Ancil Payne, KING-TV and its sister stations developed a corporate culture characterized by political liberalism, expressed through broadcast editorials and a dedication to the Bullitts' notion of public service. In 1952, Senator Joseph McCarthy threatened to have KING-TV's license revoked after the station barred the senator from delivering an allegedly libelous attack on the air. In 1966, Stimson Bullitt himself made the only televised appearance of his career when he delivered an impassioned and controversial editorial against the Vietnam War, long before the American public as a whole began to turn against the conflict's prosecution.

All of the King Broadcasting television stations including KING-TV, KREM-TV, KTVB and KGW-TV traditionally ended their broadcast days with the playing of the Old 100th set to nature scenes, produced for them by the Religious Broadcasting Commission of the state councils of churches (and later Churches of the Northwest).

== Death and legacy ==
Dorothy Bullitt died on June 27, 1989, at the age of 97. She was interred at Evergreen Washelli Memorial Park. By the time of her death, King Broadcasting owned six television stations in four states, and radio stations in Seattle, Portland, and San Francisco, as well as a cable TV company, broadcast sales companies, and mobile production facilities; its estimated $300–400 million market value made it one of the most valuable privately held media companies on the West Coast. Bullitt bequeathed ownership of King Broadcasting to her daughters, Priscilla "Patsy" Bullitt Collins and Harriet Bullitt, who sold the properties to the Providence Journal Company in 1991 in a sale brokered by Ancil Payne. All three Bullitt children have donated substantial amounts of money and time to the Bullitt Foundation, founded by Dorothy in 1952 with a mission to protect the natural environment of the Pacific Northwest, and to other charitable organizations and causes. Patsy Bullitt Collins, who died in 2003, was ranked 16th in that year's "Slate 60" list of the nation's largest charitable donors for bequests to the Nature Conservancy, CARE USA, and the Trust for Public Land totaling $71.1 million.

Today, King Broadcasting is a subsidiary of TEGNA, based in McLean, Virginia. Bullitt's original KING AM station changed owners, frequencies, and call letters several times in the 1990s; its old 1090 kHz frequency is currently occupied by conservative talk station KPTR. When the Bullitt sisters sold the company to the Providence Journal in 1991, they donated KING-FM to a nonprofit organization formed by the Seattle Opera, the Seattle Symphony, and the Corporate Council for the Arts (now ArtsFund). In 2011, the stakeholder organizations and the board of KING-FM shifted KING from a commercial station to a nonprofit in its own right. KING-FM still broadcasts classical music in Seattle today, having never changed format since its founding in 1948.
