= King Broadcasting Company =

American media company

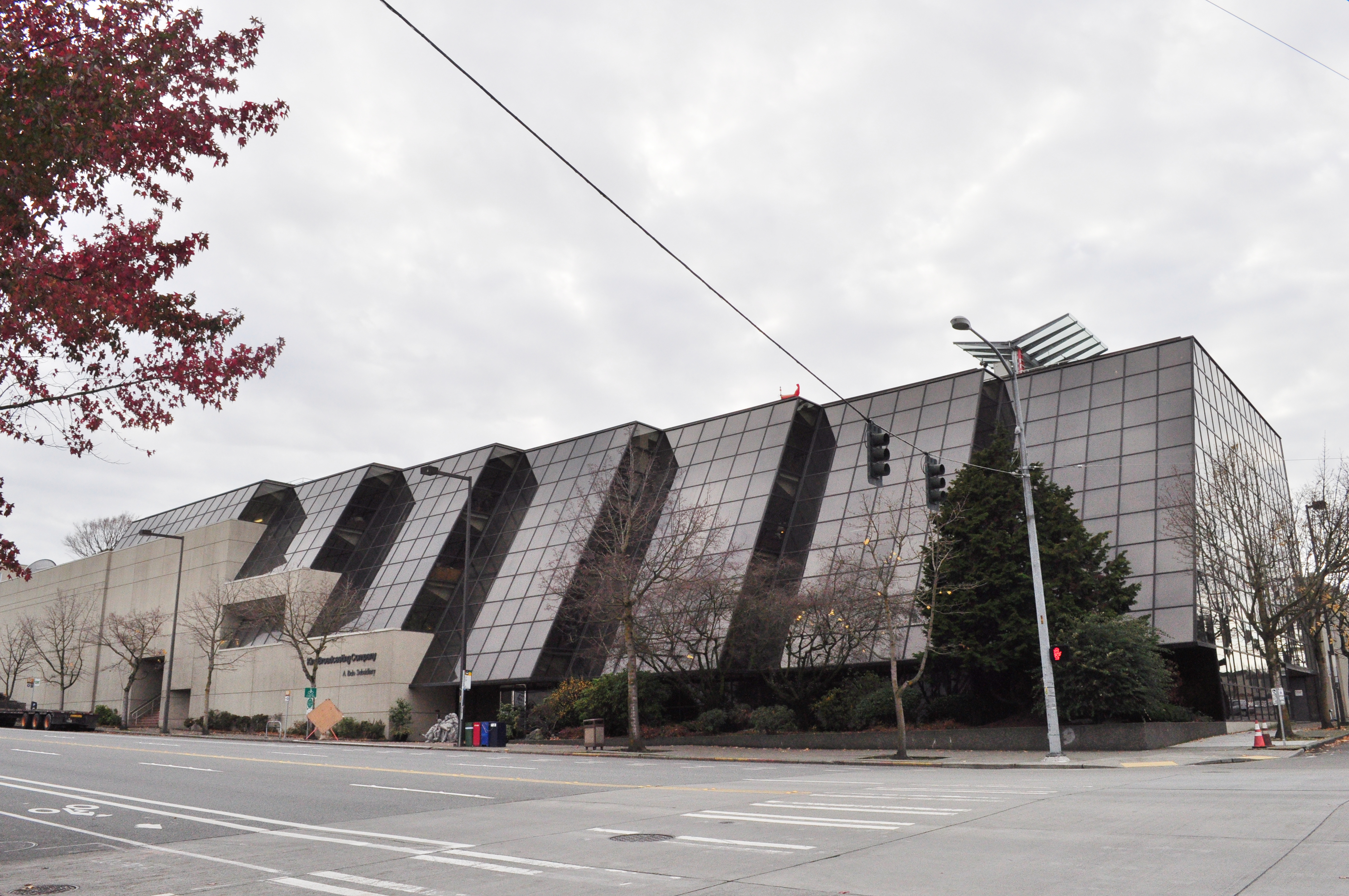
- King Broadcasting Company's headquarters and offices & studios for KING-TV & KONG-TV at 333 Dexter Avenue N, South Lake Union, Seattle, circa 2013. It was the headquarters from 1979 to 2016, when KING-TV moved south to SoDo; it was demolished later that year. In its place is a new taller building, currently serving as the Seattle offices for Apple Inc.
- Type: Subsidiary
- Industry: Broadcast television, Broadcast radio
- Founded: June 18, 1946; 80 years ago
- Founder: Dorothy Bullitt
- Fate: Assets split up; name used by Tegna Inc./Nexstar Media Group for license holding
- Successors: Providence Journal Company; Belo Corporation; Tegna Inc.; Nexstar Media Group
- Headquarters: Seattle, Washington, United States
- Area served: Western United States
- Key people: Patsy Bullitt Collins (Chairwoman); Steven A. Clifford (President & CEO)
- Parent: Providence Journal Company (1992–1997); Belo Corporation (1997–2013); Gannett (2013–2015); Tegna Inc. (2015–present)

King Broadcasting Company is an American former media conglomerate founded in 1946 by Dorothy Bullitt. The company was owned by the Bullitt family until it was sold to the Providence Journal Company in 1991; it is currently a division of the Tegna subsidiary of Nexstar Media Group as the licensee for its remaining stations. Based in Seattle, Washington, it began with one AM radio station and grew to include a large group of broadcast television and radio stations as well as a cable television network throughout the Western United States.

== History ==
In 1946, Dorothy Bullitt purchased Seattle radio station KEVR, 1090 AM. KEVR had no network affiliation and relied entirely on syndicated programming from service providers such as World Transcription Service, MacGregor Transcription Service, and Fredrick W. Ziv Productions. Due to this, KEVR aired programs such as Boston Blackie, The Shadow, The Lone Ranger, and Calling All Cars, programs the big network radio stations did not have. As a result, KEVR offered independent listening choices that maintained a rather large listening audience, the cost, of which, was supported by commercial advertising sponsors. Although not having a network was a tough proposition, the station prospered under Dorothy Bullitt's guidance.

In the early days, the Ziv Company also furnished syndicated television programming to KING-TV, such as Highway Patrol, starring Broderick Crawford, and Sea Hunt, starring Lloyd Bridges.

Bullitt's radio station later raised its output power to 50,000 watts, the maximum allowed in the United States.

Also in 1947, Bullitt purchased call letters from a fishing boat and changed KEVR to KING.

In 1948, Dorothy Bullitt constructed KING-FM at 98.1 to air classical music, her favorite. In 1949, she purchased KRSC-TV, Channel 5, for $375,000. The call letters of the television station were also changed to KING-TV.

When KRSC-TV first went on the air Thanksgiving Day, November 25, 1948, under other ownership, it was the only television station west of Minneapolis and north of San Francisco. At that time, many considered television a fad and passing fancy. Consequently, making a go of a television station during this time period was a daunting effort.

On 30 September 1948, the Federal Communications Commission announced a "freeze" on the granting of new television licenses (those already authorized were allowed to begin or continue operations). The commission had already granted over 100 licenses and was inundated with hundreds of additional applications. Unable to resolve several important interference, allocation and other technical questions because of this rush, the FCC believed that the freeze would allow it to hold hearings and study the issues, leading to something of a "master blueprint" for television in the United States. With the 14 April 1952 issuance of the commission's 6th Report and Order, the freeze was finally lifted.

Therefore, from November 25, 1948, to December 10, 1953, when KOMO-TV came on the air, KING-TV was the only television station in Seattle, which allowed it to develop a progressive program, sales, and engineering infrastructure. Any stations, coming on the air in Seattle following the 1952 freeze lift, would have the task of developing their own methods. Therefore, KING-TV was ahead of the game when KOMO-TV began operations.

In the beginning, the station had only a few programs to televise. KING-TV's broadcast day began in late afternoon and finished by 10 p.m. each evening.

KING-TV became an NBC affiliate in 1959 after switching networks with rival KOMO-TV.

KING was the first local station in the United States to purchase a two-inch, quad, video tape machine from the Ampex Corporation at the National Association of Broadcasters (NAB) convention in 1956. The machine was delivered and put into operation in November 1957.

Soon after buying Channel 5, Bullitt mandated what was one of the first local news operations in the country. She then helped shape it into a news unit that earned a national reputation for innovation and public service. KING-TV also excelled in producing local non-news programming.

"She had a very strong hand in determining policy. However, people called her the 'velvet steam roller,' which was a complimentary term meaning that she always used a kind, gentle hand when dealing with everyone. When Dorothy Bullitt made a suggestion, it was always interpreted as an order. I have never known anyone who had such a handle on what her employees, and the community in general, wanted and needed as Dorothy Bullitt," said Ancil Payne, who joined King Broadcasting in 1960 as an assistant to the vice president of the business division and retired in 1987 as president of the company.

Also in the 1970s, the company expanded, under the leadership of Edward Hewson, into the cable television arena with the formation of King Videocable, which eventually expanded from its Northwestern base to serve around 500,000 customers from the West and into the Midwest.

Dorothy Bullitt remained president of the company until 1961 when she was succeeded by her son, Stimson Bullitt. She served as chairwoman of the board until 1967 and remained active until her death in 1989.

In 1972, Dorothy Bullitt's daughters assumed positions with the company's board of directors. Priscilla "Patsy" Collins took charge of the board, and Harriet Stimson Bullitt became head of the board's executive committee. Payne also became president of the company that year, taking over for Stimson Bullitt, and would hold that position until Steven A. Clifford was named president in 1987.

Following Dorothy Bullitt's death, the Bullitt family decided to exit the broadcasting industry and focus on environmental philanthropy with the Bullitt Foundation; as a result, the company was broken up and its assets were sold off in 1991. On March 2 of that year, Bullitt's daughters announced that they would sell the television assets and the King Broadcasting name to the Providence Journal Company, publisher of The Providence Journal newspaper; the sale was completed the following year on February 25. Meanwhile, the remaining radio stations were sold to various companies; the Seattle radio stations were sold to Classic Radio, Inc., which the Bullitt family retained control over until 1994. The mobile television company was spun off to its own management. The company's cable television systems were included in the sale to the Providence Journal Company and were integrated into their own cable holdings; these holdings were sold in 1995 and have since been absorbed into Comcast.

The King Broadcasting stations were later acquired by the Belo Corporation in 1997 with its purchase of the Providence Journal Company. Belo itself was acquired by the Gannett Company in 2013. Gannett's print and broadcast assets were split into two companies in 2015, with King Broadcasting following the broadcast assets into the newly created Tegna Inc.

The King Broadcasting name lives on as a holding company within Tegna's corporate structure (as is also the case with other companies absorbed into Gannett such as Multimedia and a forerunner of Combined Communications, Pacific and Southern Company). It is still the licensee for the former King Broadcasting television stations, except KHNL, which Belo sold to Raycom Media in 1999, and (for a short while) KGW, which was spun off to Sander Media as part of the Belo acquisition due to Gannett's ownership of the Statesman Journal newspaper in Salem, Ore. Gannett operated KGW through a shared services agreement, an arrangement that was inherited by Tegna. However, KGW was reunited with its King Broadcasting stablemates when Tegna fully acquired the Sander-held stations in December 2015.

== Former stations ==
- Stations are arranged in alphabetical order by state and city of license.
- Two boldface asterisks appearing following a station's call letters (**) indicate a station built and signed on by King Broadcasting.

Stations owned by King Broadcasting Company
Media market	State	Station	Purchased	Sold
San Francisco	California	KSFO	1984	1991
San Francisco	California	KYA-FM	1983	1991
Honolulu	Hawaii	KHNL	1986	1997
Boise	Idaho	KTVB	1979	1997
Portland	Oregon	KGW	1953	1991
Portland	Oregon	KGW-TV **	1956	1997
Portland	Oregon	KINK **	1968	1991
Seattle–Tacoma	Washington	KING	1947	1991
Seattle–Tacoma	Washington	KING-FM **	1947	1991
Seattle–Tacoma	Washington	KING-TV	1949	1997
Spokane	Washington	KREM	1957	1984
Spokane	Washington	KREM-FM	1957	1984
Spokane	Washington	KREM-TV	1957	1997

== Film production ==
King Broadcasting Company established a subsidiary, King Screen Productions, in 1966, to produce movies, mainly documentary films. The Redwoods, a short documentary produced by King Screen, won an Academy Award in 1968. The company financed Michael Roemer's film The Plot Against Harry, which became famous for having been completed in 1970 but not securing a commercial release until 1990. Although King Screen was sold in 1972, King Broadcasting continued to control the film's rights at the time of the 1990 release.

== See also ==
- KONG (TV) (Everett-licensed duopoly partner of KING-TV)
- King Videocable
- National Mobile Television
- Northwest Cable News
