= List of TV Guide editions =

The following is a list of each of the regional editions of TV Guide Magazine, which mentions the markets that each regional edition served and the years of publication. Each edition is listed under exactly one region (generally either for a single city, or a single or multiple neighboring states or provinces). Thus, for editions overlapping region lines, the listing appears in only one of the neighboring regions. For example, the Nebraska edition also included stations in Sioux City, Iowa and Sioux Falls, South Dakota.

During the period that TV Guide published local program listings from 1953 to 2005, the magazine did not print regional editions for the U.S. territories, although Puerto Rico has a similar magazine called Teve Guía. Also, three U.S. states, Delaware, South Dakota, and Wyoming, never had their own editions. The northern part of Delaware (part of the Philadelphia market) was served by the Philadelphia edition, and the southern part (part of the Salisbury market) by the Washington-Baltimore edition. Stations in eastern South Dakota (Sioux Falls market) appeared in the Nebraska edition, and subscribers in western South Dakota (Rapid City) and Wyoming received the Northern Colorado edition.

The markets that served as the primary area, mostly those with white numbers on black channel bullets, are listed in bold text. In some editions, multiple stations appeared on the same channel, which required the editors to be creative in assigning channel bullets to stations. For example, the Montana edition at one time listed channel 2 stations in Billings (black bullet with white number), Spokane (white bullet with black number), Salt Lake (horizontally striped white bullet with black number), and Denver (white bullet with center black stripe containing white number).

Many of the dates are imprecise because exact dates of when editions went into and out of circulation are not easily available. The Oregon edition that started publishing on August 20, 1955, was the 33rd regional edition of TV Guide. According to the September 13, 1958, Utah-Idaho edition, there were 51 regional editions of TV Guide being printed in the United States.

Unless otherwise noted, regional editions in the United States can be assumed to have ended with the October 9, 2005, issue, after which TV Guide began publishing national listings based on time zone.

== United States ==
State	Edition	Dates in existence	Television market availability	Circulation (1988)	Notes
Alabama	Alabama	at least 1959–1963	Birmingham; Montgomery; Huntsville; Dothan; Columbus, Georgia		
Alabama	Gulf Coast	at least by 1959	**Biloxi, Mobile-Pensacola, Panama City**	80,147	
Alabama	Northern Alabama	from at least Sept. 29, 1962	**Birmingham, Huntsville, Florence, Tuscaloosa, Anniston, Decatur, Nashville, Tennessee, Columbus, Mississippi**	150,295	
Alabama	Southern Alabama	from 1963	**Montgomery; Selma; Dothan; Columbus, Georgia**	57,456	
Alaska	Anchorage-Fairbanks	July 5, 1997 – December 26, 1998	**Anchorage**, Fairbanks, Juneau		
Arizona	Arizona	1959–1962, 2004–2005	**Phoenix**, **Tucson**, Yuma-El Centro, Flagstaff		
Arizona	Phoenix	1962–2004	**Phoenix**, Yuma-El Centro, Flagstaff	249,915	
Arizona	Tucson	1962–2004	**Tucson**	66,517	
Arkansas	Arkansas	from 1959	**Little Rock, Fort Smith-Fayetteville** (southern part), **Monroe-El Dorado, Shreveport-Texarkana** (until 1982)	53,169	
California	Bakersfield	from 1996	**Bakersfield**		
California	Santa Barbara-Bakersfield	1982–1996	**Bakersfield, Santa Barbara**	179,543	
California	Central California	at least 1959–1982	**Bakersfield, Fresno, Santa Barbara**		
California	Coachella Valley	from 1997	**Palm Springs**		
California	Fresno	from 1982	**Fresno**, Bakersfield, parts of San Francisco, Salinas-Monterey and Sacramento (until 1994)	59,359	Became Fresno MediaOne edition in 1991
California	Los Angeles Metropolitan	from July 23, 1966	**Los Angeles**, Palm Springs (before 1997)	1,281,144	Became Ultimate Cable edition from 1998–2002; customized editions for area cable operators in Los Angeles and Orange counties was also published from 1997 to 2004
California	Northern California	from July 24, 1954	**San Francisco-Oakland** (until 1969), **San Jose-Salinas** (until 1969), **Sacramento** (primary), **Chico**-Redding, Eureka, Reno (until 1965)	313,115	
California	Sacramento (Comcast)	1997–2004	**Sacramento**		
California	San Diego	from July 23, 1966	**San Diego**, Los Angeles (an edition for Cox Cable subscribers within the city limits was also published)	240,256	
California	San Francisco County	1997–2004	**San Francisco-Oakland** (within San Francisco County)		
California	San Francisco Metropolitan	from 1969	**San Francisco-Oakland, San Jose-Salinas-Monterey, Sacramento**	704,770	
California	Santa Barbara-Ventura	from 1996	**Santa Barbara, Los Angeles** (Ventura County portion)		
California	Southern California	1953–July 16, 1966	**Los Angeles**, San Diego, Santa Barbara		
Colorado	Colorado	at least by January 5, 1957 – 1979	**Denver, Colorado Springs-Pueblo**, Albuquerque, Goodland		
Colorado	Denver	from 1972	**Denver** (metro part)	88,459	
Colorado	Northern Colorado	from 1979	**Denver** (northern portion), **Cheyenne**	55,612	
Colorado	Southern Colorado	from 1979	**Colorado Springs-Pueblo**, Grand Junction, **Denver** (southern portion)	47,893	
Connecticut	Connecticut Valley	at least January 4, 1958 – 1960	**Hartford-New Haven, Springfield**		
Connecticut	Hartford-New Haven	from August 2, 1980	**Hartford-New Haven, Springfield, Massachusetts, New York City VHF stations**	167,577	
Connecticut	Western New England	1960–July 26, 1980	**Hartford-New Haven, Springfield**		
District of Columbia	Washington	from 1994	**Washington**		
Florida	Central Florida	1960–1977	**Orlando-Daytona Beach, Tampa-St. Petersburg, Ft. Myers**		
Florida	Florida State	at least February 19, 1955 – 1960	**Jacksonville, Orlando-Daytona Beach, Tampa-St. Petersburg, Ft. Myers**		
Florida	Florida-Georgia	1962–1973	**Jacksonville, Tallahassee-Thomasville, Albany**		
Florida	Northern Florida	1960–1962, from 1973	**Jacksonville, Gainesville, Tallahassee-Thomasville** (Florida part, 1960–1962)	63,942	
Florida	Orlando	from 1977	**Orlando-Daytona Beach**	147,310	
Florida	Sarasota	1977–1984	**Sarasota, Ft. Myers**		
Florida	South Florida	at least from 1958	**Miami, West Palm Beach**	223,680	Was known as the Florida Gold Coast Edition until 1960. Never included ZNS-TV in the Bahamas.
Florida	Tampa Bay	1977–1984	**Tampa-St. Petersburg**		
Florida	Tampa-Sarasota	from 1984	**Tampa-St. Petersburg, Sarasota, Ft. Myers-Naples**	140,002	
Georgia	Atlanta	from August 1980	**Atlanta**	301,802	
Georgia	Georgia	at least 1959–1973	**Atlanta, Macon**, Chattanooga		
Georgia	North Georgia	1973–August 1980	**Atlanta, Macon**, Chattanooga		
Georgia	South Georgia	from 1973	**Columbus, Macon, Tallahassee-Thomasville, Albany**	65,577	
Hawaii	Hawaii (later renamed Hawaii-Oceanic Cable)	from August 7, 1968	**Honolulu** (including satellite stations until 1993)	56,916	
Idaho	Idaho	from November 22, 1975	**Boise-Nampa**, **Twin Falls**, Idaho Falls-Pocatello, Casper, Riverton, Rock Springs, Jackson	44,842	
Illinois	Chicago	at least by June 5, 1953 – 1965	**Chicago**, Rockford, South Bend (until 1962)		
Illinois	Eastern Illinois	September 15, 1962–	**Springfield, Peoria-Bloomington, Champaign-Decatur, Terre Haute**	83,979	
Illinois	Chicago Metropolitan	from 1965	**Chicago**	423,428	
Illinois	Illinois	at least November 13, 1953 – September 8, 1962	**Quad Cities** (Illinois side, although issues were also sold on the Iowa side), **Quincy-Hannibal, Springfield, Peoria, Champaign**		
Illinois	Illinois-Wisconsin	June 23, 1973 – 2001; 2004–2005	Madison, **Milwaukee**, Rockford, **Chicago** (Northern areas)	241,338	
Illinois	Northern Illinois	1965–June 16, 1973	**Chicago** (non-metro), Rockford		
Western Illinois	September 15, 1962–	**Quad Cities** (Illinois side, although issues were also sold on the Iowa side) **Quincy-Hannibal, Peoria-Bloomington, Springfield, Kirksville-Ottumwa**	92,896	(Edition also sold in most of northeastern Missouri)	
Indiana	Central Indiana	at least by November 17, 1962 – 2004	**Indianapolis, Lafayette, Terre Haute**	183,506	
Indiana	Evansville-Paducah	September 15, 1962–	**Evansville, Paducah-Cape Girardeau-Harrisburg**	82,584	
Indiana	Indiana	at least by November 19, 1955 – 1962 and 2004–2005	**Indianapolis, Lafayette, Terre Haute, Ft. Wayne, Champaign (until 1962)**		
Indiana	Northern Indiana	from 1962	**Ft. Wayne, South Bend**	120,416	
Iowa	Iowa	at least by June 12, 1953	Des Moines, **Cedar Rapids-Waterloo, Dubuque, Fort Dodge, Quad Cities, Kirksville-Ottumwa**	148,222	
Kansas	Kansas State	from 1960	**Wichita, Great Bend, Dodge City, Hays, Garden City**	61,749	
Kansas	Wichita	at least by August 3, 1957 – 1960	**Wichita, Great Bend, Hays**		
Kentucky	Kentucky	1956–	**Louisville, Lexington** (**Evansville** through September 8, 1962 edition), Cincinnati, **Danville**, **Hazard**, **Campbellsville**, KET (Kentucky Educational Television) affiliates in **Elizabethtown, Somerset**, **Hazard, Morehead, Lexington, Owenton,** and **Louisville** (under omnibus "E" and later "KET" channel slug)	121,556	
Louisiana	Louisiana	at least 1957–1959, later from 1962	**Baton Rouge, Lafayette-Lake Charles, Alexandria**	130,822	
Louisiana	Louisiana-Mississippi	1959–1962	**Baton Rouge, New Orleans, Lafayette-Lake Charles, Alexandria**, Jackson, Meridian		
Louisiana	New Orleans	from 1972	**New Orleans**	64,090	
Louisiana	Shreveport-Texarkana	at least by 1983	**Shreveport-Texarkana**, Lufkin-Nacogdoches	72,607	
Maine	Maine	July 21, 1973–	**Portland, Bangor**, Presque Isle	90,207	
Maryland	Baltimore	from 1994	Baltimore, Salisbury		
Maryland	Baltimore-Washington	1953–1994	**Washington, Baltimore, Salisbury**	539,485	
Massachusetts	Boston	1980–2004	**Boston, Providence-New Bedford, Manchester**	461,105	
Massachusetts	Boston-Providence	2004–2005	**Boston, Providence-New Bedford**		
Massachusetts	Eastern New England	1960–1980	**Boston, Providence-New Bedford**		Was known as the Boston edition briefly in 1968
Massachusetts	New England	(Vol. 1, No. 1) April 3, 1953 – 1960	**Boston, Providence, Manchester**, Portland		
Massachusetts	Springfield-Chicopee-Holyoke	from 1980	**Springfield, Hartford, Connecticut**	75,410	
Massachusetts	Worcester	1982–1987	**Boston, Springfield** (Worcester area)		
Michigan	Detroit	at least by April 24, 1953	**Detroit, Lansing**-**Flint** (until 1957), **Toledo** (until 1982)	172,116	
Michigan	Flint-Lansing	from 1981	**Flint-Saginaw-Bay City, Lansing-Jackson**	127,314	
Michigan	Grand Rapids	from 1981	**Grand Rapids-Kalamazoo-Battle Creek-Muskegon**	83,924	
Michigan	Michigan State	at least 1957–1981	**Flint-Saginaw-Bay City, Lansing-Jackson, Grand Rapids-Kalamazoo-Battle Creek-Muskegon**, Traverse City-Cadillac, Alpena		
Michigan	Northern Michigan	from 1981	**Traverse City-Cadillac, Alpena**	74,486	
Minnesota	Minneapolis-St. Paul	At least from December 3, 1955	**Minneapolis-St. Paul** (metropolitan portion)	143,800	
Minnesota	Minnesota State	from at least July 16, 1955	**Minneapolis-St. Paul** (non-metro), **Duluth-Superior**, Rochester-Austin-Mason City, La Crosse-Eau Claire, **Alexandria, Mankato**	131,923	
Minnesota	Northern Minnesota	at least by January 21, 1955 – 1958	**Duluth, Minneapolis-St. Paul** (non-metro, north of city), Fargo		
Minnesota	Northwest	at least by May 15, 1953 – 1955	**Duluth, Minneapolis-St. Paul**, Rochester-Austin-Mason City, La Crosse-Eau Claire		
Minnesota	Southern Minnesota	1955–1958	**Minneapolis-St. Paul**, Rochester-Austin-Mason City, La Crosse-Eau Claire		
Mississippi	Central Mississippi	1979–2004	**Jackson, Meridian, Greenwood-Greenville, Tupelo** (southern part)	42,934	
Mississippi	Mississippi	1962–1979	**Jackson, Meridian, Greenwood, Hattiesburg**		
Mississippi	Mississippi State	2004–2005	**Jackson, Meridian, Greenwood, Hattiesburg, Biloxi**		
Mississippi	South Mississippi	1979–2004	**Biloxi, Hattiesburg, Meridian**	45,541	
Missouri	Kansas City	at least by June 11, 1955	**Kansas City, Topeka, St. Joseph**	219,837	
Missouri	Missouri	at least by 1958	**Springfield, Joplin-Pittsburg, Jefferson City-Columbia**, Ft. Smith-Fayetteville (northern part), Tulsa, OK	118,013	
Missouri	St. Louis	at least by February 1, 1958	**St. Louis**	240,873	
Montana	Montana	from December 4, 1965	**Billings, Helena, Great Falls**, Butte, Missoula, Miles City, Glendive, Williston, and selected stations from Denver, Salt Lake, Spokane, and Lethbridge, Alberta.	27,907	The only TV Guide edition that featured local broadcast listings from three different time zones - Mountain, Central (Williston, ND), and Pacific (Spokane, WA).
Nebraska	Nebraska	at least by January 22, 1954	**Omaha** (until 1996), **Lincoln-Hastings-Kearney, North Platte, Sioux City**, Sioux Falls	126,290	Until 1979, split-run advertisements also mentioned McCook, Rapid City, and the entire state of Wyoming, but there were no listings for any television stations in those areas
Nebraska	Greater Omaha	from 1996	**Omaha**		
Nevada	Las Vegas	1997–2004	**Las Vegas**		
Nevada	Nevada	1965–1997 and 2004–2005	**Las Vegas**, Reno, Sacramento (area near Lake Tahoe, until 1990)	76,885	
Nevada	Reno	1997–2004	**Reno**, Sacramento (area near Lake Tahoe)		
New Hampshire	New Hampshire	from July 21, 1973	**Boston** (New Hampshire part), **Manchester**, **Portland** (New Hampshire part)	151,691	
New Hampshire	Northern New England	1960–1973	**Bangor, Portland, Manchester**		
New Jersey	New Jersey-Pennsylvania	1971–1982 (approximately)	served non-metro portions of New Jersey **New York City VHF stations, Philadelphia**		
New Mexico	New Mexico	at least by December 3, 1960 – 1979; From 1981	**Albuquerque-Santa Fe**, El Paso, Roswell, Carlsbad	82,407	
New Mexico	Albuquerque	1979–1981	**Albuquerque**		
New York	Albany	from 1977	**Albany**, Burlington-Plattsburgh (southern part)	76,795	
New York	Binghamton	at least by July 18, 1959 – 1965	**Binghamton, Elmira**		
New York	Buffalo Metropolitan	from 1977	**Buffalo-Niagara Falls**	92,382	
New York	Central New York State	1973–1977	**Syracuse**		
New York	Eastern New York State	December 4, 1965 – 1977	**Albany, Utica, Syracuse** (until 1973), Burlington-Plattsburgh (southern part)		Split from New York State edition
New York	New York Metropolitan	from Vol. 1 No. 1 April 3, 1953	**New York City, Hartford major players**	1,600,174	
New York	New York State	at least 1955–November 27, 1965	**Albany, Binghamton, Menands, Rochester, Schenectady, Syracuse, Utica, Watertown**		Split into East and West editions
New York	Pennsylvania-New York	from 1973	**Binghamton, Elmira, Wilkes-Barre-Scranton**, Syracuse (2004–2005 only)	65,066	
New York	Rochester	from July 9, 1977	**Rochester**	57,063	
New York	Syracuse	1977–2004	**Syracuse, Utica, Watertown** (except eastern St. Lawrence County)	62,718	
New York	Western New York State	from December 4, 1965	**Buffalo, Rochester** (served non-metro areas from 1977 onward)	54,237	Split from New York State edition
North Carolina	Carolina-Tennessee	March 26, 1960-August 1980	**Knoxville, Bristol-Kingsport-Johnson City, Asheville-Greenville-Spartanburg**		
North Carolina	Charlotte	from 1980	**Charlotte**, Greensboro-High Point-Winston-Salem	165,165	
North Carolina	Eastern North Carolina	from 1980	**Raleigh-Durham, Wilmington, Greenville-New Bern-Washington**	152,024	
North Carolina	North Carolina	at least by December 22, 1956 – 1980	**Charlotte, Greensboro-High Point-Winston-Salem, Raleigh-Durham**, Wilmington, Greenville-New Bern-Washington		
North Dakota	Dakota-Winnipeg	1958–1965	**Winnipeg**, Brandon, **Fargo**, **Bismarck**, Minot, Aberdeen, **Pembina**		
North Dakota	North Dakota	from 1965	**Fargo-Grand Forks, Bismarck**-Minot-Williston, Aberdeen (until 1971), Pembina (until 1975), Dickinson (after 1978)	47,343	
Ohio	Central Ohio	1972–February 24, 1979	**Dayton, Lima**, Zanesville, Columbus (outside metro area)		Split into Lima and Columbus Metropolitan
Ohio	Cincinnati	1980–2004	**Cincinnati**	163,650	
Ohio	Cincinnati-Columbus-Dayton	(Vol. 1, No. 1) April 3, 1953 – 1956	**Cincinnati, Columbus, Dayton**		
Ohio	Cincinnati-Dayton	1972–1980	**Cincinnati**, Dayton		
Ohio	Cleveland	at least July 24, 1953 – 1975	**Cleveland, Youngstown, Erie**		
Ohio	Cleveland Metropolitan	from 1975	**Cleveland**	53,490	
Ohio	Columbus Metropolitan	March 3, 1979 – 2004	**Columbus**	106,036	Split from Central Ohio
Ohio	Dayton	1980–2004	**Dayton**	119,887	
Ohio	Lima	March 3, 1979 – 1982			Split from Central Ohio. Renamed Toledo-Lima
Ohio	Northern Ohio	from 1975	**Cleveland** (outside metro area)	70,869	
Ohio	Southern Ohio	at least by October 30, 1954 – 1972; Revived 2004–2005	**Dayton**, Zanesville, **Cincinnati** (outside metro area in 1957-73 edition), **Columbus** (outside metro area in 1957-73 edition)		
Ohio	Toledo-Lima	from 1982	**Toledo, Lima**	70,287	Was Lima.
Ohio	Youngstown-Erie	from 1975	**Youngstown, Erie**	168,683	
Oklahoma	Oklahoma	at least by October 27, 1956 – 1965, 1970–1981 and 2004–2005	**Oklahoma City**, Tulsa, **Lawton-Wichita Falls, Texas** (1970–1981 and 2004–2005), Ada-Ardmore-Sherman-Denison (1970–1981 and 2004–2005)		
Oklahoma	Oklahoma City	1965–1970, 1981–2004	**Oklahoma City**, **Lawton-Wichita Falls, Texas**, Ada-Ardmore-Sherman-Denison	105,374	
Oklahoma	Tulsa	1965–1970, 1981–2004	**Tulsa**	40,459	
Oregon	Eugene	1977–1984	**Eugene**, Bend		
Oregon	Oregon/Oregon State	August 20, 1955 – 1977; 1984–October 16, 2005	**Portland, Eugene**, Klamath Falls, Medford, Roseburg, Coos Bay, Bend	52,881	The Portland edition was separated from this edition in 1961, and merged back into it in 2003; the Eugene edition separated from this edition from 1977–1984; during this time, the edition's name was changed to "Southern Oregon State"
Oregon	Portland	July 15, 1961 – December 26, 2003	**Portland, Salem, Vancouver, Washington**	108,423	Was merged with Oregon State edition in 2003; Ultimate Cable/Paragon/AT&T/Comcast (large) edition was published from October 9, 1999 to October 1, 2005
Oregon	Southern Oregon State	1977–1984	**Eugene**, Klamath Falls, Medford, Roseburg, Coos Bay		Derived from Oregon State edition during the time the Eugene edition was being published
Pennsylvania	Central Pennsylvania	from 1965	**Harrisburg-Lancaster-York-Lebanon, Scranton, Wilkes-Barre, Philadelphia major players, New York City VHF stations**	171,254	
Pennsylvania	Hazleton-Williamsport	at least by December 1, 1955 – 1965			This edition served cable systems in these two cities
Pennsylvania	Johnstown-Altoona	1975–2004	**Johnstown-Altoona, Pittsburgh major players**	71,796	Merged with Pittsburgh edition in 2004
Pennsylvania	Northeast Pennsylvania	at least by July 30, 1955 – 1957	**Wilkes Barre-Scranton**		
Pennsylvania	Philadelphia	from Vol. 1, No. 1 April 3, 1953	**Philadelphia** included **New York City VHF stations since 1981**(metro portion)	561,186	
Pennsylvania	Pittsburgh (Metro)	July 31, 1953 (issue #18)	**Pittsburgh** (Including Johnstown-Altoona, Wheeling-Steubenville, Clarksburg-Weston and Youngstown)	262,554	Pittsburgh stations were listed first; each would have their own edition but was still listed in this one until their editions merged back into the Pittsburgh edition in 2004; experimental large format was published in 1991; was Pittsburgh Metro edition from 1975 to 2004
Pennsylvania	Scranton-Wilkes-Barre	1956–1973	**Wilkes Barre-Scranton**		Was merged into the Pennsylvania-New York edition, according to the Library of Congress
Pennsylvania	Southeast Pennsylvania	June 25, 1973–	**Harrisburg-Lancaster-York-Lebanon, Philadelphia major players, Baltimore major players** (non-metro, west of city)	99,215	
Rhode Island	Providence	1980–2004	**Providence-New Bedford, Boston major players, Hartford, Connecticut major players**	202,367	
South Carolina	Greenville-Spartanburg-Asheville	from 1980	**Greenville-Spartanburg-Asheville**	98,319	
South Carolina	South Carolina	at least by 1959	**Columbia, Charleston, Florence**, Augusta, Savannah	116,398	
Tennessee	Bristol-Kingsport-Johnson City	August 1980–	**Bristol-Kingsport-Johnson City**	70,643	
Tennessee	Knoxville-Chattanooga	August 1980 – 2005	**Knoxville, Chattanooga**	57,327	
Tennessee	Memphis	February 27, 1960 – 2005	**Memphis**, Jackson-Lexington, Tupelo (Columbus and West Point after 1980), Jonesboro (added in 1967), Greenville-Greenwood (after 1980)	106,989	
Tennessee	Nashville	February 27, 1960 – 2005	**Nashville, Bowling Green** (Paducah-Cape Girardeau through September 8, 1962 issue)	130,717	Experimental large format was published in 1991
Tennessee	Tennessee	August 25, 1956 – February 20, 1960	Nashville, **Jackson**, **Memphis**, Tupelo, Paducah-Cape Girardeau		
Texas	Austin	2000–2005	Austin		
Texas	Dallas-Fort Worth	from 1972	**Dallas-Ft. Worth** (metro portion)	162,659	
Texas	El Paso	1979–1981	**El Paso**, Roswell		
Texas	Houston	from 1977	**Houston**	176,012	
Texas	North Texas	at least by February 19, 1955	**Dallas-Ft. Worth** (outside metro area from 1972), **Ada-Denton, Tyler, Waco-Temple** (until September 17, 1960 and October 5, 1968 to 2005), Wichita Falls-Lawton	78,384	
Texas	San Antonio	1991–2003	San Antonio		
Texas	South Texas	at least 1959–2000	San Antonio (until 1991), Austin, **Corpus Christi, Laredo** (from October 5, 1968), **Harlingen-Weslaco-Brownsville** (from October 5, 1968), Waco-Temple (from September 24, 1960 to September 28, 1968)	73,828	
Texas	South Texas (revised, with cable listings)	2000–2005	San Antonio, **Corpus Christi, Laredo, Harlingen-Weslaco-Brownsville**		
Texas	Southeast Texas	at least by 1959	**Houston** (outside metro area from 1977), Beaumont-Port Arthur, Bryan-College Station, Lufkin, Lake Charles, Louisiana	58,778	
Texas	West Texas	from 1959	**Amarillo, Lubbock**, Midland-Odessa, **Abilene-Sweetwater, San Angelo**	57,214	
Utah	Salt Lake	from November 22, 1975	**Salt Lake City**, Grand Junction (until 1979)	112,043	
Utah	Utah-Idaho	September 13, 1958 – November 15, 1975	**Salt Lake City**, Boise, Twin Falls, Idaho Falls, Casper, Riverton, Grand Junction		
Vermont	Vermont	from November 22, 1975 (Most of Vermont had previously been covered by the Montreal-St. Lawrence edition)	**Burlington-Plattsburgh**, Watertown (eastern St. Lawrence County)	45,486	
Virginia	Central Virginia	1962–2004	**Roanoke, Bluefield-Beckley-Oak Hill** (merged into Virginia State edition in 2004)	63,041	
Virginia	Eastern Virginia	1962–2004	**Norfolk, Richmond, Charlottesville**-Harrisonburg; Merged into Virginia in 2004	157,101	
Virginia	Virginia	1957–1962	**Norfolk, Richmond**, Bristol-Kingsport-Johnson City, Roanoke		
Virginia	Virginia State	2004–2005	**Norfolk, Richmond, Charlottesville**-Harrisonburg, Roanoke-Lynchburg		
Virginia	Virginia-Carolina	at least by April 16, 1955 – 1957	**Norfolk**, Roanoke, **Richmond**, **Raleigh-Durham**, Greensboro-High Point-Winston-Salem		
Washington	Eastern Washington State	at least by 1957	**Spokane** (non-metro only from 1979; Returned in 2004 merger), Yakima, Kennewick-Pasco-Richland, Moses Lake (during KBAS's 1957-61 existence), Walla Walla (for the brief time in 1960 that KNBS-TV lasted), Wenatchee (during KCWT's existence), Pullman, Lewiston, Moscow, and, until 1965, Missoula and Great Falls	47,379	
Washington	Puget Sound	At least by April 30, 1960 – 1972; revived 1997–2004	**Seattle**, Bellingham; also Vancouver and Victoria until 1965		During the latter years of publication, the edition served as cable guide listings
Washington	Seattle-Tacoma	At least by September 2, 1961 – 1972 and 2004–2005	**Seattle**		Ultimate Cable edition was published from 1998 to 2002
Washington	Spokane	1979–2004	**Spokane** (metro area)	48,422	Was merged into Eastern Washington edition in 2004
Washington	Western Washington State	1954–1961; 1972–2004	**Seattle**, Bellingham; also Vancouver and Victoria	310,552	Edition was renamed "Seattle-Tacoma" in 2004
West Virginia	Huntington	at least in 1953	**Huntington**		
West Virginia	West Virginia	at least by March 2, 1957	**Charleston-Huntington, Bluefield-Beckley-Oak Hill, Parkersburg**, Wheeling, Lewisburg, Clarksburg-Weston, Columbus, **Athens, Portsmouth**, Hazard, KET (Kentucky Educational Television) affiliates in **Pikeville, Ashland**, Hazard, and Morehead (under omnibus "KET" channel slug)	137,246	
West Virginia	Wheeling-Steubenville	1975–2004	**Wheeling-Steubenville, Clarksburg-Fairmont** (merged with Pittsburgh edition in 2004)	106,039	
Wisconsin	Illinois-Wisconsin	June 23, 1973 – 2001; 2004–2005	Madison, **Milwaukee**, Rockford, **Chicago** (Northern areas)	241,338	
Wisconsin	Madison	2001–2004	Madison		
Wisconsin	Milwaukee Metro	2001–2004	**Milwaukee**		
Wisconsin	Northern Wisconsin	from June 23, 1973	Green Bay, Wausau-Rhinelander, Marquette, **Milwaukee** (Northern Metro)	166,183	
Wisconsin	Wisconsin	(Issue #46) February 12, 1954 – June 16, 1973	**Milwaukee**, Madison, Green Bay-Fond du Lac, Wausau-Rhinelander, Eau Claire-La Crosse, Marquette		

Source for 1988 circulation figures: Audit Bureau of Circulation, June 30, 1988, Consumer Magazine and Agri-Media Rates and Data, January 27, 1989, pp. 465–67.

== Canada ==
Beginning on December 4, 1965, TV Guide split some of its editions listing both American and Canadian stations. An article called The Canadian Report was then launched in those editions sold primarily or solely in Canada. The Canadian edition of TV Guide split off into its own publication in January 1977. On November 5, 2005, all remaining editions of TV Guide were consolidated to two editions, one for Eastern Canada and one for Western Canada. The print edition of TV Guide ended after the November 25, 2006, issue, though the publication continues as a web magazine (which was incorporated into another website, The Loop by Sympatico, in December 2012), with occasional print specials sold at newsstands.

There were no TV Guide editions for Newfoundland and Labrador, or for the northern territories. Some communities, such as Dawson Creek, British Columbia, and Thunder Bay, Ontario, also had no TV Guide coverage. Television listings in these regions were usually provided by local newspapers and/or local magazines. One such example is the Newfoundland Herald, which features television listings for the province, along with entertainment news and light features.

TV Guide editions sold in Quebec are generally limited to Anglophone communities, and featured only local listings for Montreal, Sherbrooke, and/or Ottawa. TV Guide's francophone counterpart is TV Hebdo, which features television listings for most stations in Quebec and the Ottawa Valley. Published by Québecor Média, it remains in publication to this day. The November 6, 1954 (Chicago edition) of TV Guide has a list of Editions that TV Guide serves, and gift subscriptions are available for 29 U.S states (plus the District of Columbia), and Canada is mentioned at the end of the list as: Canada (Toronto, Hamilton, Windsor, Vancouver).

Province	Edition	Dates in existence	TV market availability	Notes
Alberta	Montana-Alberta	1962–November 27, 1965	Despite the title, the only Montana stations listed here were those of Great Falls; this edition also listed Calgary, Edmonton, Lethbridge, Medicine Hat and Red Deer	Was split into separate Alberta and Montana editions
Alberta	Alberta-Eastern British Columbia	from December 4, 1965 – 1972	Calgary, Edmonton, Lethbridge, Medicine Hat, Red Deer, Kamloops, Kelowna	This edition also included listings for distant US locals from Great Falls and Spokane.
Alberta	Alberta	at least by 1973–1978	Calgary, Edmonton, Lethbridge, Medicine Hat, Red Deer	This edition also included listings for distant US locals from Great Falls and Spokane.
Alberta	Alberta	1986–1998	Calgary, Edmonton, Lethbridge, Medicine Hat and Red Deer	
Alberta	Calgary-Southern Alberta	1978–1986	Calgary, Red Deer	
Alberta	Calgary	at least 1988–1997	Calgary, Red Deer	This edition likely started as a regional edition for Calgary as early as 1986. By the early 1990s, the printed listings adopted the cable dial position bullets used by other "cable editions". Initially Rogers Cable was identified with black numeric bullets and Calgary Cable/Shaw Cable was identified by white numeric bullets. By the mid 1990s Shaw Cable owned both systems and as a result the listings were updated to reflect the single cable line-up for Calgary with dial positions identified with black numeric bullets.
Alberta	Calgary-Edmonton	1997–1998	Calgary, Edmonton, Medicine Hat, Lethbridge, Red Deer	Short-lived combined Calgary and Edmonton cable listings. Edition ran from Late August 1997 to March 1998. This edition replaced individual cable editions; Calgary Cable Edition and Edmonton Cable Edition both of which were in circulation as early as 1993
Alberta	Shaw Calgary-Southern Alberta	1998–2005	Calgary, Red Deer, Medicine Hat, Lethbridge	
Alberta	Edmonton-Northern Alberta	1978–1986	Edmonton, Lloydminster	
Alberta	Edmonton	at least 1986–1997	Edmonton	This edition started out as a regional edition for the Edmonton area. By the early 1990s the listings format adapted the "cable edition" format used by other cable editions. Videotron dial positions where identified with black numeric bullets while Shaw dial positions where identified with white numeric bullets.
Alberta	Shaw Edmonton-Northern Alberta	1998–2005	Edmonton, Lloydminster	Also known as Edmonton & Area Edition
British Columbia	Puget Sound	1962–November 27, 1965	Vancouver, Victoria, Bellingham,	This edition served markets in both Canada and US.
British Columbia	Western British Columbia	from December 4, 1965-mid 2005	Vancouver, Victoria	This edition became known as BC Edition starting in 1995.
British Columbia	Greater Vancouver Rogers	at least by 1993	Vancouver, Victoria	This edition was renamed to Vancouver Shaw in 2001.
British Columbia	Vancouver Shaw + BC	mid-2005–Oct 29 2005	Vancouver, Victoria	This edition was the result of merging BC Edition and Vancouver Shaw
British Columbia	Eastern British Columbia	from 1972–1981	Kamloops, Kelowna, Prince George	
British Columbia	Interior British Columbia	from 1981	Kamloops, Kelowna, Prince George, Terrace	
Manitoba	Dakota-Winnipeg	February 18, 1961 – November 27, 1965	Winnipeg, Brandon, Pembina, Fargo, Bismarck	This edition was sold in the US and Canada. This was the third edition to serve viewers in Canada. There was no cable from United States until 1968, and TV Guide didn't publish the American stations until August, 1970.
Manitoba	Manitoba-Saskatchewan	December 4, 1965 – February 2, 1980	Winnipeg, Brandon, Regina, Saskatoon, Moose Jaw, Prince Albert, Yorkton, Swift Current	This edition did not list any U.S. locals until August 1970 with the exception for KCND from Pembina. There was no cable from United States until 1968, and TV Guide didn't publish the American stations until August, 1970.
Manitoba	Manitoba	February 9, 1980 – 2005	Winnipeg, Brandon	
New Brunswick; Nova Scotia; Prince Edward Island	Maritimes	1976–2005	Saint John, Moncton, Halifax, Sydney, Charlottetown, Rimouski (Quebec)	
Ontario	Cancom	at least by the early 1990s	Timmins, Sudbury (except the cities of Sudbury and Elliot Lake), North Bay, Sault Ste. Marie	Despite the Cancom name, this edition primarily served northeastern Ontario
Ontario	North Shore	at least by early 1988–199?	Serving Sault Ste. Marie, Elliot Lake & Blind River.	Featured cable specific listings for Sault Ste. Marie and Elliot Lake. White numeric bullets indicated listings for Sault Ste. Marie and Black Numeric Bullets indicated listings for Elliot Lake.
Ontario	Sudbury	at least by early 1988-December 23, 1989	Sudbury	
Ontario	Sudbury-Elliot Lake	December 30, 1989 – 1996	Sudbury (Sudbury and Elliot Lake areas)	
Ontario	Northern Cable Edition	at least by 1997	Timmins, Sudbury, North Bay	
Ontario	Northern Ontario Edition	at least by 2001	Timmins, Sudbury, North Bay, Thunder Bay	
Ontario	Western Ontario	from December 4, 1965 – October 29, 2005	London, Windsor, Wingham	
Ontario	Hamilton and Niagara	August 23, 1980 – 1981	Hamilton, Niagara Falls, Kitchener, Brantford	
Ontario	Hamilton and Region	1981–2002	Hamilton, Kitchener, Brantford	
Ontario	Lake Ontario	at least by January 29, 1955 – 1965	Toronto, Hamilton, Kitchener, Buffalo, Rochester, Syracuse, Watertown, Kingston, Peterborough, Wingham, London	This edition was also sold in the U.S., in the Buffalo and Rochester markets
Ontario	Toronto-Lake Ontario	December 4, 1965 – August 16, 1980	Toronto, Hamilton, Kitchener, Niagara Falls, Peterborough, Barrie, Buffalo, Rochester	
Ontario	Toronto	August 23, 1980 – August 5, 1995	Toronto, Kitchener, Peterborough, Barrie	
Ontario	Toronto-Peterborough	August 12, 1995 – 2002	Toronto, Kitchener, Peterborough, Barrie	
Ontario	Central Ontario	2002–2005	Toronto, Hamilton, Kitchener, Niagara Falls, Peterborough, Wingham, Barrie	
Ontario	Toronto-Rogers-Central Ontario	April 2005–Nov 2005	Toronto, Hamilton, Kitchener, Niagara Falls, Peterborough, Wingham, Barrie	
Ontario	Toronto-Rogers Cable	1991–2005	Toronto	
Ontario	Oshawa-Peterborough	August 23, 1980 – August 5, 1995	Toronto (Durham Region), Peterborough	
Ontario	Eastern Ontario	1979–2005	Ottawa, Kingston, Pembroke	The cable lineup chart also mentions Rouyn-Noranda and Val-d'Or, though this edition did not include listings for local channels in those cities. Edition was known as Ottawa-Eastern Ontario edition until 1994.
Quebec	Hudson Valley	at least 1957–1958	Montreal, Sherbrooke, Burlington-Plattsburgh, Albany, Syracuse	This edition was also sold in the U.S., in the Burlington-Plattsburgh, Syracuse and Albany markets.
Quebec	St. Lawrence	at least by November 23, 1957 – 1965	Montreal, Ottawa, Kingston, Sherbrooke, Burlington-Plattsburgh	This edition was also sold in the U.S., in the Burlington-Plattsburgh market
Quebec	Montreal-St. Lawrence	1965–1979	Montreal, Ottawa, Kingston, Sherbrooke, Burlington-Plattsburgh	
Quebec	Montreal-Quebec	1979–1984	Montreal, Sherbrooke, Trois-Rivières, Québec	
Quebec	Montreal	at least 1984–2005	Montreal, Sherbrooke, Trois-Rivières	Quebec city stations dropped from this edition. Starting in 1990s, primetime grids featured cable positions for CF Cable and Videotron in Montreal
Saskatchewan	Saskatchewan	February 9, 1980 – 2005	Regina, Saskatoon, Moose Jaw, Prince Albert, Yorkton, Swift Current	

Note: Market availability refers to the television markets in which a particular edition was available. Many editions also contained listings for other markets in which they were not available. For example, New York City listings appeared in many adjacent editions, although only the New York Metropolitan Edition was ever available in New York City.
