= Bright House Networks =

American telecommunications company (2003–2016)

Bright House Networks, LLC
- Type: Subsidiary
- Industry: Telecommunications
- Founded: April 1, 2003; 23 years ago
- Defunct: May 18, 2016; 10 years ago
- Fate: Acquired by Charter Communications and merged with Time Warner Cable to form Charter Spectrum
- Successor: Charter Spectrum
- Headquarters: Syracuse, New York, US
- Key people: Steve Miron (CEO); Nomi Bergman (President); Bill Futera (EVP and CFO)
- Products: Digital cable Phone service High-speed Internet; Business data solutions Home security and automation
- Parent: Advance Publications

Bright House Networks, LLC also simply known as Bright House, was an American telecom company. Prior to its purchase by Charter Communications, it was the tenth-largest multichannel video service provider and the 6th largest cable internet provider (based on coverage) in the United States. The company served more than 2.2 million customers, mostly in Florida.

Bright House Networks' primary service offerings included digital television, high-speed internet, home security and automation and voice services.

Bright House Networks also owned and operated two 24-hour local news operations; Central Florida News 13 serving the Orlando area, and Bay News 9 serving the Tampa Bay area.

== History ==
Evolution of Spectrum
- 1898: James Cox establishes what would become Cox Enterprises through acquiring the Dayton Evening News
- 1962: After acquiring dozens of newspapers and local channels over the decades, Cox Enterprises forms its cable business
- 1973: Warner Communications established a cable division that eventually launched QUBE, which popularized cable menus
- 1984: After launching dozens of cable networks with American Express, Warner Cable sold the MTV Networks to Viacom
- 1989: Time Inc. and Warner Communications merged into a single company called Time Warner, forming what was the world's largest media company
- 1992: Time Warner consolidated its separate cable divisions into a single business entity called Time Warner Cable
- 1993: Charter Communications was founded and merged with Marcus Cable in 1997
- 2001: Heavy debt led to AT&T selling its cable division to Comcast while Liberty Media was spun off to comply with regulations
- 2003: Bright House Networks, a former partnership between Time Warner Cable and Advance Publications, began offering its own standalone services
- 2007: Time Warner Cable acquired parts of the bankrupt Adelphia Corporation, and succeeds it as a partially public company
- 2009: Time Warner spun off its majority interest in Time Warner Cable to focus on being a pure-play entertainment company
- 2014: Several years after emerging from bankruptcy, Charter launched Spectrum as its consumer-facing brand
- 2016: After Comcast withdrew from its attempted buyout of TWC, Charter acquired both Time Warner Cable and Bright House Networks for $89 billion
- 2024: Charter surpassed Comcast as the largest Pay-TV provider by customers
- 2026: After merging with Cox and acquiring Liberty Broadband, the combined entity is set to retire the "Charter" name.

Prior to 1994, some of the systems were fully owned by Advance Publications under the names Vision Cable and Cable Vision (no relation to Cablevision in the New York City metro area). In other areas, Bright House Networks was the successor to TelePrompTer Cable TV, Group W Cable, Strategic Cable, Paragon Cable and Shaw Communications. In Florida, Bright House succeeded Time Warner Cable's Tampa Bay and Orlando systems (themselves formerly Vision Cable and Paragon).

All of the systems that eventually came to be owned by Bright House Networks were previously owned by the Time Warner Entertainment–Advance/Newhouse Partnership. Bright House Networks, LLC was formerly known as TWEAN Subsidiary, LLC and changed its name to Bright House Networks, LLC on April 1, 2003. Under a deal struck in 2003, Advance/Newhouse took direct management and operational responsibility for a portion of the partnership cable systems roughly equal to their equity. Bright House Networks offers video, high-speed data, home security and automation and voice services. In addition, Bright House Networks operated two regional local news channels – Bay News 9 in the Tampa Bay market, and News 13 in the Orlando market. Bright House Networks had an extensive fiber optic network in the Florida area and used it to provide commercial services including dedicated Internet access, VPN services, and private network transport as well as telecom facilities such as SIP trunking and PRI service.

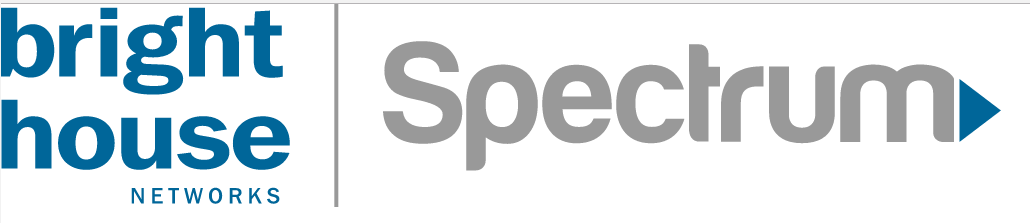
Bright House Networks Spectrum logo (2016–2017)

On March 31, 2015, Charter Communications announced it would acquire Bright House in a $10.4 billion deal, contingent on Time Warner Cable waiving its right of first refusal to acquire the latter company, which was not expected to be exercised given the then-pending Comcast–Time Warner Cable merger. On May 26, 2015, after Comcast had abandoned its plans to buy Time Warner Cable, Charter announced its own plans to merge with TWC, as well as a renegotiated arrangement for the purchase of Bright House. On April 25, 2016, regulators approved both mergers; Advance/Newhouse gained a stake of roughly 14 percent in the combined company. As a result of the deal, the Bright House and Time Warner Cable brands would be phased out and eliminated, with both services amalgamated under Charter's Spectrum brand over the coming months. Spectrum plans to withdraw Bright House's automation and security services in February 2020 to focus on television services.

== Service area ==
The company provided service to areas including Indianapolis, Central Florida (Orlando / Daytona Beach areas), Tampa/Lakeland area, Birmingham–Hoover area, west suburban Detroit, and Bakersfield. Most of its former business was concentrated in Central Florida.

== Naming rights ==
Bright House Networks held the naming rights to UCF's Bright House Networks Stadium (now FBC Mortgage Stadium) in Orlando, Florida; Bright House Field (now BayCare Ballpark) in Clearwater, Florida, the spring training home of the Phillies; and the Bright House Networks Amphitheatre (now Spectrum Amphitheatre) in Bakersfield, California. They formerly served as title sponsor of the Futures Tour Bright House Networks Open golf tournament, held in Lakeland, Florida.

== Carriage disputes ==
When Bright House Networks was separate from Time Warner Cable, most of its carriage deals were still negotiated on its behalf by Time Warner Cable. Thus, Bright House Networks customers were affected whenever there were carriage disputes between TWC and a content provider, which has happened several times.

- From its inception in 2003, Bright House Networks's systems in central Florida, including Orlando, refused to carry Fox Sports Florida. This dated back to when the central Florida cable franchise was held by Cablevision, and then Time Warner Cable. As Bright House is by far the largest cable provider in central Florida, this left most of the Orlando area without most Orlando Magic games. The dispute ended in 2009, when Bright House added Fox Sports Florida to its lineup.
- On September 15, 2008, Bright House temporarily dropped stations owned by the LIN TV Corporation on its Pensacola, DeFuniak Springs and Indiana systems. Affected stations were WALA-TV in Mobile, Alabama, WISH-TV/WNDY-TV/WIIH-CA in Indianapolis and WANE-TV in Fort Wayne, Indiana. Even though the controversy was focused on Time Warner Cable systems, Bright House was included in the dispute, in areas where they were formerly owned by Time Warner. With both companies factored in, a total of 15 markets were affected.
- On December 31, 2008, Time Warner Cable and Viacom's MTV Networks had not agreed to renew any Viacom channel beyond the end of year. Therefore, Time Warner Cable and Bright House Networks would have lost all 19 Viacom channels (including MTV, Comedy Central and Nickelodeon) starting on January 1, 2009. This blackout was narrowly avoided when a zero-hour deal was reached shortly after 12 Midnight ET on January 1, 2009.
- In December 2009, the Fox Broadcasting Company announced that a dispute with Time Warner Cable could lead to Fox's owned and operated affiliates to be pulled from Bright House systems in the Detroit, Tampa Bay, Orlando and Gainesville markets, along with Fox's cable and sports channels in all markets served by Bright House. The carriage protests were announced shortly before Fox was to carry the Bowl Championship Series, which included the Florida Gators in the Sugar Bowl. The dispute excluded FX, Fuel TV, Fox Movie Channel, Fox News Channel, Fox Business Network and some regional sports channels, which are on separate contracts. Shortly before the 12 midnight ET deadline on December 31, 2009, Fox granted Time Warner Cable and Bright House a brief extension during New Year's Day as talks continued, so viewers would not miss the Sugar Bowl, though the other bowl games and the NFL lineup remained at risk. A settlement between the two parties was reached the evening of January 1, 2010, though no terms were disclosed; during the discussions that day, none of Fox's channels or stations were blacked out.
- In July 2010, ABC's parent company, Disney, announced that Disney was involved in a carriage dispute with Time Warner Cable for the first time since 2000 (because Bright House Networks deals are negotiated by Time Warner Cable, Bright House customers were also affected). In Bright House-served areas, the dispute involved the Disney Channel, Disney XD, ABC Family, and all the networks of ESPN. Despite word of an early agreement on August 30, 2010, it was not until the evening of the September 2 deadline that an agreement was reached between Disney and Time Warner Cable.
- On July 9, 2012, Hearst Television removed its stations from Time Warner Cable and Bright House Networks systems when the parties failed to reach a deal. In the interim, WESH Orlando was replaced on Bright House systems in Central Florida with WBRE-TV Wilkes-Barre, Pennsylvania, a station owned by the Nexstar Broadcasting Group, while other Hearst stations on Bright House were replaced with other cable channels offered by Bright House. Nexstar complained that Bright House has used WBRE's signal outside their markets without permission, while Bright House argued it was within its rights to use that station's signal as a replacement until a deal with Hearst was reached. According to Time Warner Cable, the dispute stemmed from Hearst's demand of a 300% increase in its retransmission fees. The substitutions lasted until July 19, 2012, when the deal was reached between Hearst and Time Warner.
- On August 2, 2013, at 5 pm, the carriage deal between CBS and Time Warner Cable expired, with no renewal deal being reached until a month later. Time Warner had major markets affected by the blackout, while only a few Bright House markets lost access to CBS and CW stations owned by CBS Television Stations, as well as cable channels FLIX and The Smithsonian Channel; Bright House's territory includes CBSTS-owned broadcast stations Tampa CW station WTOG-TV and Detroit's WKBD-TV and WWJ-TV on their Livonia, Michigan system, which were blacked out.) Premium channels Showtime and The Movie Channel, which are also owned by CBS, were similarly pulled from the cable lineup, including the corresponding Video On Demand services. Bright House said that CBS withdrew permission to air Showtime, while CBS denied that and called the blackout a "punitive" measure by TWC.

== See also ==
- List of United States telephone companies
- Pivot Wireless
