= Spectrum (brand) =

Brand of Charter Communications used to market telecommunications services

Charter Spectrum

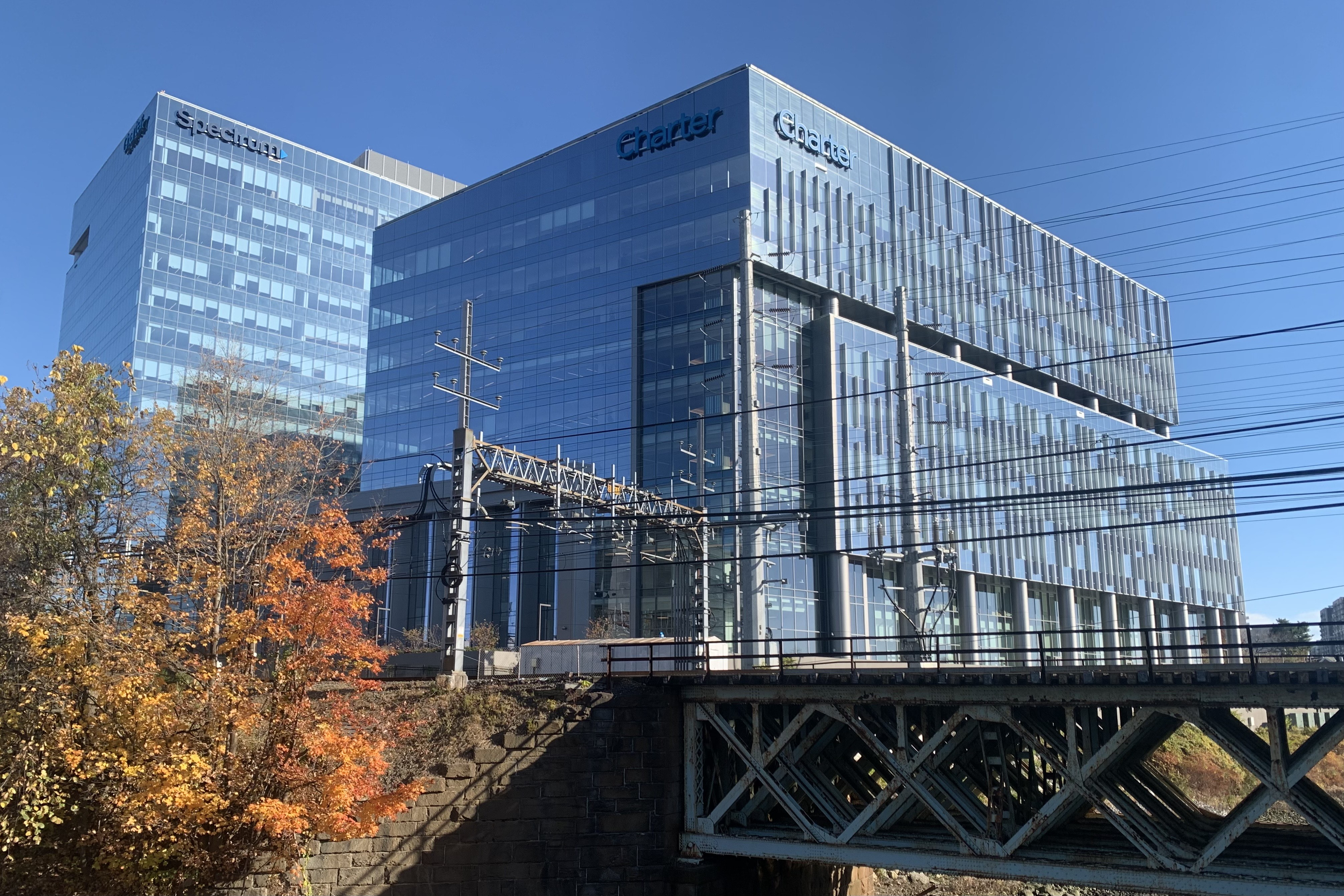
- Headquarters in Stamford, Connecticut
- Product type: Broadband; Cable television; Digital cable; Digital telephone; HDTV; Home security (2016-2020); Internet; Internet security; Mobile phone; VoIP phone
- Current owner: Charter Communications
- Country: United States
- Introduced: 2014
- Website: www.spectrum.com (official website) www.spectrum.net (for subscriber services)

Spectrum is the trade name of Charter Communications. The name is widely used by both market consumers and commercial businesses. Services that Spectrum offers include cable television, internet access, internet security, managed services, mobile phone, and unified communications.

The Spectrum brand name was introduced in 2014. Prior to that, these services were marketed primarily under the Charter brand. Following the acquisitions of Time Warner Cable and Bright House Networks by Charter in 2016 as well as its acquisition of Cox Communications in 2026, these operations also merged into the Spectrum brand.

== Internet service ==
=== History ===
Evolution of Spectrum
- 1898: James M. Cox established a company that grew into Cox Enterprises after he bought the Dayton Evening News
- 1962: Over the next several decades, Cox grew from a local newspaper business into a diversified conglomerate company and established Cox Communications
- 1973: Warner Communications brought together its smaller cable units and began broadcasting The Movie Channel
- 1977: American Express and Warner Cable entered into a joint venture to fund early Pay Television networks, but within eight years, the subsidiary was sold to Viacom
- 1989: Time Inc. and Warner Communications merged into a single company called Time Warner, forming what was the world's largest media conglomerate
- 1992: Time Warner Cable was established as the merged cable unit of Time Warner, and until 2016, it was the second-largest American cable company by subscribers
- 1993: Charter Communications was founded and it merged with Marcus Cable in 1997
- 2001: Heavy debt led to AT&T selling its cable division to Comcast while Liberty Media was spun off to comply with regulations
- 2003: Bright House Networks, a former partnership between Time Warner Cable and Advance Publications, began offering its own standalone services
- 2007: Time Warner Cable acquired parts of the bankrupt Adelphia Corporation, and succeeds it as a partially public company
- 2009: Time Warner spun off its majority interest in Time Warner Cable to focus on being a pure-play entertainment company
- 2014: Several years after emerging from bankruptcy, Charter launched Spectrum as its consumer-facing brand
- 2016: After Comcast withdrew from its attempted buyout of TWC, Charter acquired both Time Warner Cable and Bright House Networks for $89 billion
- 2024: Charter surpassed Comcast as the largest Pay-TV provider by customers
- 2026: After merging with Cox and acquiring Liberty Broadband, the combined entity is set to retire the "Charter" name.

Road Runner's official logo in 1995

Time Warner Cable first launched what would become Road Runner with a 1995 market test in Elmira, New York, under the banner Southern Tier On-Line Community. Later it became known as LineRunner (a moniker subsequently employed by its VoIP service), before Time Warner Cable adopted the Road Runner brand name.

Road Runner High Speed Online employed the Road Runner character from the Road Runner/Wile E. Coyote cartoons (part of the Looney Tunes/Merrie Melodies franchises) distributed by Warner Bros. Pictures as its mascot and brand name. However, in 2012, it was rebranded as simply Time Warner Cable Internet, dropping the Road Runner branding that Time Warner Cable had to license from the now unaffiliated Warner Bros. (although the mascot was dropped a year ago). With Charter's acquisition of Time Warner Cable in May 2016, the service was rebranded as "Spectrum Internet" on September 20, 2016.

=== Bandwidth caps ===
Despite raising prices of its Internet service within the previous year, Time Warner Cable announced in February 2009 that it would expand its bandwidth caps and coverage fees into four additional markets by the end of the year.

On April 1, 2009, the cities to have metered billing were announced, which included Beaumont, Texas; Rochester, New York; Austin, Texas; San Antonio, Texas; and Greensboro, North Carolina.

These metered-based billing plans were canceled according to Time Warner Cable "due to customer misunderstanding".

Caps would range from 5 GB to 100 GB with no unlimited option. The bandwidth will include downloads and uploads. If a user goes over, they will be charged $1 per additional gigabyte. Time Warner Cable announced they would provide a meter for users to monitor their usage. The new plan was set to begin in the summer of 2009; however, they had decided against the bandwidth caps due to protests. Currently, users have unlimited bandwidth usage given that it does not exceed the predetermined data service maximum as given in the "master agreement". Time Warner Cable would have offered unlimited data for $150/month had the plan continued.

Glenn Britt (1949–2014), CEO from 2001 until December 2013, justified the new billing plans by claiming that the infrastructures had to be continuously upgraded and users would pay for how much they use. In February 2015, a Huffington Post article alleges a 97% profit margin on Time Warner Cable's Internet service.

Facebook groups have been created in protest, in addition to an online petition and a site dedicated to stopping the movement. Other Web sites have been recently following the Time Warner Cable cap plans that were already following broadband Internet providers metering and capping plans.

U.S. Senator Chuck Schumer and Congressman Eric Massa, both of whom represent portions of the Rochester, New York market that would be affected by the changes, announced their opposition to the plan and even went as far as to threaten legislation to ban such a scheme. On April 16, 2009, Time Warner Cable abandoned the plan.

As a condition of the merger with TWC, Spectrum agreed not to impose any bandwidth usage caps for seven years post-merger.

=== Time Warner Cable Maxx ===
On January 30, 2014, Time Warner Cable announced its new TWC Maxx initiative in New York City and Los Angeles, which substantially boosted service speeds at no additional cost compared to the existing speed tiers, with the highest speed tier tripling from 100 Mbit/s to 300 Mbit/s.

As of mid-2016, TWC Maxx upgrades were completed in New York City up the Hudson Valley, Los Angeles, Austin, Kansas City, Dallas, San Antonio, Raleigh, Hawaii, and Charlotte. Rollouts of TWC Maxx in San Diego, Greensboro, and Wilmington were completed in early 2016.

After the TWC acquisition by Charter in May 2016, TWC Maxx upgrades were indefinitely put on hold. The TWC Maxx initiative later became moot, with the DOCSIS 3.1 platform rolling out across the entire network.

=== Spectrum Internet ===
After its merger with TWC and Bright House Networks, Charter Spectrum started offering broadband Internet plans across its entire service area. In December 2017, Charter began its rollout of DOCSIS 3.1, initially in early TWC Maxx markets, which increased speeds and added a gigabit tier. As of April 2020, most of the Spectrum footprint has Spectrum Internet Gig available. Starting base package speeds were increased to 200/10 Mbit/s in all service areas on March 23, 2022. In September 2024, Spectrum launched their Spectrum 'Life Unlimited' (4.0) brand platform, which included Spectrum Internet Premier, running at 500/20 Mbit/s, as their base Internet access package.

In late 2022, Spectrum began a three-phase plan to upgrade its network. The first phase, deploying a high-split architecture, enables gigabit upload speeds, allowing for symmetrical gigabit service. The second phase, rolling out distributed access architecture (DAA) via Remote PHY, will enable multi-gigabit download speeds, but its completion has been delayed until 2027, due to unavailability of certified hardware. The third phase, deploying extended spectrum DOCSIS 4.0 (ESD), will provide even higher download speeds, up to 10 Gbit/s.

== Mobile services ==
=== Road Runner Mobile (defunct) ===
In late 2009 after splitting off from Time Warner (now Warner Bros. Discovery), Time Warner Cable began reselling Clearwire mobile WiMAX service as Road Runner Mobile, bundled with the company's existing broadband, TV and VoIP services. In October 2009, the company indicated that they'd be launching their incarnation of the service starting December 1 in Raleigh, Durham, Cary, Chapel Hill, Charlotte and Greensboro, and later, Dallas, San Antonio, Austin, Honolulu, and Maui.

As of late 2011, Time Warner Cable stopped signing up new Road Runner Mobile customers under resold Clearwire WiMAX service. Existing WiMAX customers could continue to use the service, but TWC began signing up new Road Runner Mobile customers under resold Verizon Wireless 4G LTE services. As of late 2012, however, all mentions of Time Warner Cable-branded mobile broadband services have been removed from Time Warner Cable's website and most regional franchises, and eventually, those customers were transitioned directly to Verizon.

=== Spectrum Mobile ===
Spectrum Mobile
- Industry: Telecommunications
- Founded: June 30, 2018
- Website: www.spectrum.com/mobile

On June 30, 2018, Charter launched Spectrum Mobile, a mobile virtual network operator service. Spectrum utilizes their service area's Wi-Fi network for extended network coverage, while Verizon Wireless provides the network Spectrum Mobile utilizes for mobile service, both a traditional 4G network and newer 5G network. Devices on the Spectrum Mobile network connect to Wi-Fi network hotspots of the same name at no charge to provide full-speed connections from both business and residential Spectrum-provided routers and modems, which offer a secondary public network separate from the customer's networks.

== Original programming ==
On June 26, 2018, Charter Communications announced it had given L.A.'s Finest a series order for a first season consisting of 13 episodes. The series premiered as the cable service's first original series on May 13, 2019, marking Charter's first foray into original programming.

In August, Curfew and E Is for Edie received pickups. On March 6, 2019, the service picked up a 12-episode eighth season of the 1992–1999 NBC sitcom Mad About You, which premiered six of the episodes on November 20, 2019.

On June 11, 2019, a series titled Paradise Lost was announced as having received a pickup. On February 19, 2020, it was announced that the series would premiere on April 13, 2020.

On June 26, 2019, the DirecTV Latin America original series Todo por el juego (Everything for the Game) was announced as premiering on Spectrum Originals on July 15, 2019. The original series would be offered, along with an English-dubbed version entitled Side Games.

On January 18, 2020, it was announced that Manhunt: Unabomber would return as Manhunt: Deadly Games and premiere on February 3.

On February 13, 2020, it was announced that the Sky One series Temple would premiere on March 9, 2020.

On August 11, 2022, Charter Communications announced that it would phase out Spectrum Originals due to rising production costs.

== Controversies ==
=== Spectrum strike ===
On March 23, 2017, about 1,800 Spectrum workers went on strike in New York City, following the company's efforts to take control of workers health insurance and pension plans. The strike, which ended on April 18, 2022, is currently the longest strike in United States history. Spectrum has refused to negotiate with the workers' union, the International Brotherhood of Electrical Workers (IBEW) Local 3, instead, hiring a large temporary workforce of strikebreakers, and attempted to launch a vote to decertify IBEW Local 3. Spectrum's efforts to decertify the union has faced legal challenge, including a March 2020 decision by the National Labor Relations Board, which found "a serious and substantial issue" regarding Spectrum's efforts to decertify the union.

=== New York State ===
In 2018, Charter agreed to a $174 million fine with New York state, in lieu of the state completely revoking its franchise to operate throughout the state, which would have inconvenienced much of the state's residential and commercial operations. According to New York State, Charter did not provide new high-speed internet service to as many homes as they had promised during merger discussions with Time Warner Cable.
