= Cox Communications =

American cable provider

Cox Communications, Inc.
- Logo used since January 2019
- Type: Subsidiary
- Industry: Telecommunications
- Founded: February 1962; 64 years ago
- Headquarters: 6205 Peachtree Dunwoody Rd., Atlanta, Georgia 30328, U.S.
- Area served: Arizona, Arkansas, California, Connecticut, Washington, D.C., Florida, Georgia, Idaho, Iowa, Kansas, Louisiana, Massachusetts, Nebraska, Nevada, North Carolina, Ohio, Oklahoma, Texas, Rhode Island, Virginia
- Key people: Mark Greatrex (president and CEO); James C. Kennedy (chairman); Anne Cox Chambers (director)
- Products: Cable television; Broadband internet; VoIP; Wireless; Home Security; Business services; Gigablast fiber
- Revenue: US$11 billion (2016)
- Number of employees: 20,000 (2020)
- Parent: Charter Communications
- Website: www.cox.com

Cox Communications, Inc. (also known as Cox Cable and formerly Cox Broadcasting Corporation, Dimension Cable Services and Times-Mirror Cable), is an American digital cable television provider, telecommunications and home automation services company. It is the third-largest cable television provider in the United States, serving approximately 6.5 million customers. It is also the seventh-largest telephone carrier in the country, serving 3.5 million Internet subscribers and almost 3.2 million digital telephone subscribers. Cox is headquartered at 6205 Peachtree Dunwoody Rd in Sandy Springs, Georgia, U.S., in the Atlanta metropolitan area. It is a subsidiary of Charter Communications.

== History ==
Cox Enterprises expanded into the cable television industry in 1962 by purchasing a number of cable systems in Lewistown, Lock Haven and Tyrone (all in Pennsylvania), followed by systems in California, Oregon and Washington. The subsidiary company, Cox Broadcasting Corporation (unrelated to the Cox Media Group, which focuses on radio stations and television stations), was not officially formed until 1964, when it was established as a public company traded on the New York Stock Exchange. The company was renamed to Cox Communications in 1982. It was taken private by Cox Enterprises in 1985.

In 1993, Cox began offering telecommunication services to businesses; it was the first multiple system cable operator to do so. This eventually grew into Cox Business, which now represents $1 billion in annual revenue. In 1995, Cox acquired the Times-Mirror cable properties and as a result became a publicly traded company once again.

In 1997, Cox became the first multiple system cable operator to offer phone services to customers following the 1996 Telecom Act. Two years later in 1999, Cox acquired the cable television assets of Media General in Fairfax County and Fredericksburg, Virginia. In May 1999, Cox bought TCA Cable TV and its operations in Texas, Arkansas and Louisiana. In July 1999, Cox acquired AT&T Broadband's cable systems in Oklahoma, Arkansas, Louisiana, Texas, New Mexico, Utah and Nevada. In August 1999, Cox sold systems in Massachusetts that served about 54,000 customers to MediaOne, in exchange for Cox acquiring MediaOne systems in Connecticut and Rhode Island that served about 51,000 customers. The following year, Cox Communications acquired Multimedia Cablevision with assets in Kansas, Oklahoma and North Carolina.

In 2004, the Fairfax County Board of Supervisors found Cox Communications guilty of violating an agreement with the county which stated that all homes served by Cox within Fairfax County would be digital ready with the new fiber optic network by June 2003. When this term expired with less than 30% of the county having been completed, the Board of Supervisors decided to fine Cox $100 per day from the originally agreed completion date, until work was completed in January 2006. The Board also forbade Cox from raising rates to recover the cost of the fine for a period of 10 years from the actual completion date. The total fine was approximately $93,000. Also in 2004, Cox Communications announced plans to take the company private once again, expressing frustration in the shareholder's emphasis on short-term goals. The company was taken private for the second time in 2005.

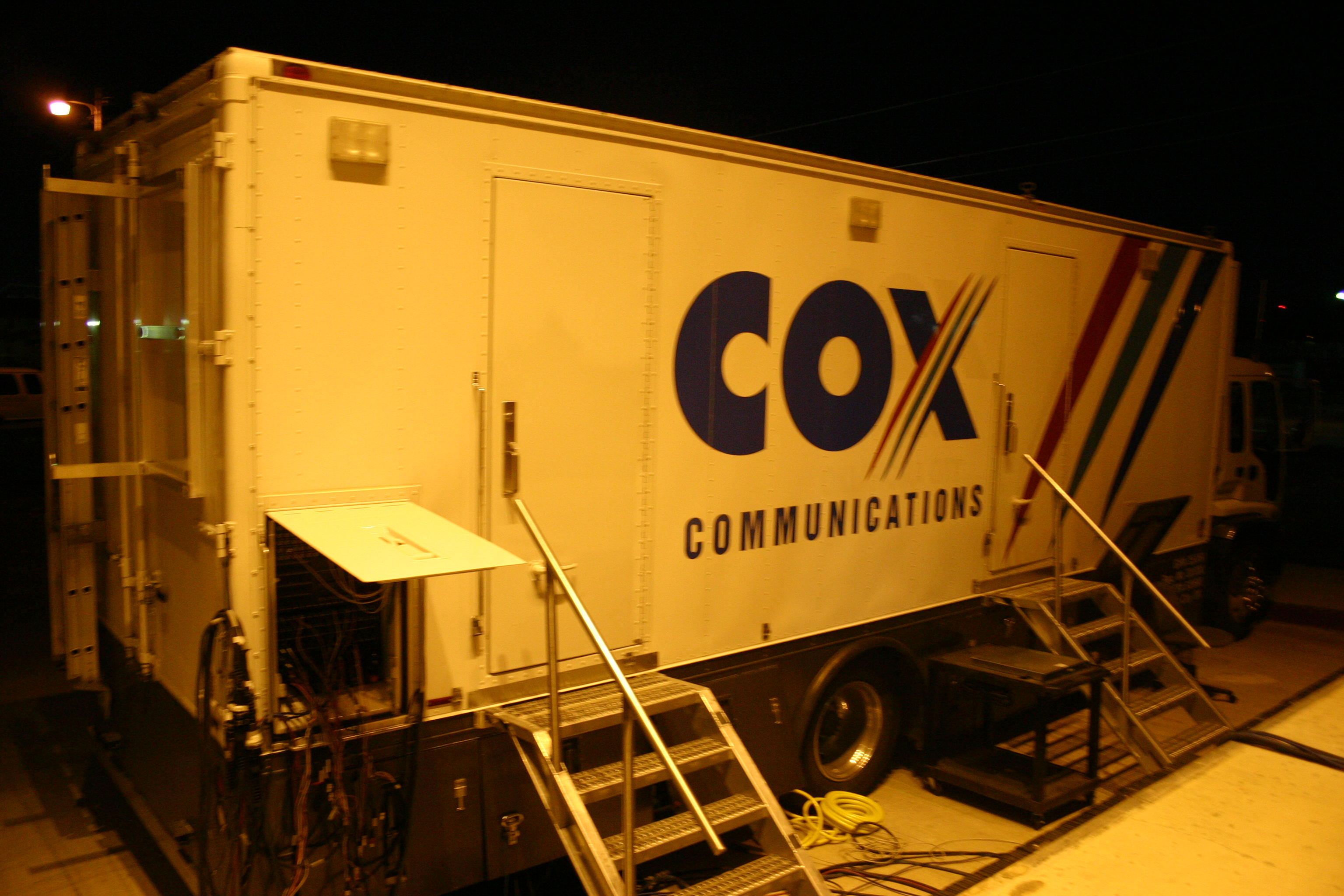
COX Communications trailer (2006) SNUPY Awards

By November 1, 2005, Cox announced the sale of all of its Texas, Missouri, Mississippi and North Carolina properties, as well as some systems in Arkansas, California, Louisiana and Oklahoma to Cebridge Communications. The sale closed in 2006 and those systems were transitioned by their new owner from Cox branding to Suddenlink Communications.

Evolution of Spectrum
- 1898: James M. Cox established a company that grew into Cox Enterprises after he bought the Dayton Evening News
- 1962: Over the next several decades, Cox grew from a local newspaper business into a diversified conglomerate company and established Cox Communications
- 1973: Warner Communications brought together its smaller cable units and began broadcasting The Movie Channel
- 1977: American Express and Warner Cable entered into a joint venture to fund early Pay Television networks, but within eight years, the subsidiary was sold to Viacom
- 1989: Time Inc. and Warner Communications merged into a single company called Time Warner, forming what was the world's largest media conglomerate
- 1992: Time Warner Cable was established as the merged cable unit of Time Warner, and until 2016, it was the second-largest American cable company by subscribers
- 1993: Charter Communications was founded and it merged with Marcus Cable in 1997
- 2001: Heavy debt led to AT&T selling its cable division to Comcast while Liberty Media was spun off to comply with regulations
- 2003: Bright House Networks, a former partnership between Time Warner Cable and Advance Publications, began offering its own standalone services
- 2007: Time Warner Cable acquired parts of the bankrupt Adelphia Corporation, and succeeds it as a partially public company
- 2009: Time Warner spun off its majority interest in Time Warner Cable to focus on being a pure-play entertainment company
- 2014: Several years after emerging from bankruptcy, Charter launched Spectrum as its consumer-facing brand
- 2016: After Comcast withdrew from its attempted buyout of TWC, Charter acquired both Time Warner Cable and Bright House Networks for $89 billion
- 2024: Charter surpassed Comcast as the largest Pay-TV provider by customers
- 2026: After merging with Cox and acquiring Liberty Broadband, the combined entity is set to retire the "Charter" name.

On May 14, 2007, Cox announced that they had sold their investment in Discovery Communications for the Travel Channel, related assets, and $1.3 billion.

In 2007, DiversityInc magazine named Cox Communications #25 in its Top 50 Companies for Diversity. Cox climbed to the sixth position on Diversity Inc.'s 2008 list. Also in 2008, Cox was named #8 on the Top 10 Companies for African Americans. Two years later, on

November 19, 2010, Cox began offering wireless services in Orange County, California; Omaha, Nebraska; and, in Hampton Roads, Virginia.

Logo used from 1995 to 2007

Logo used from 2007 to 2018

In February 2011, Cox Communications completed its Alternative Energy Project which included two fuel cell installations at each of the company's San Diego, CA and Rancho Santa Margarita, CA headquarters. Two separate PureCell System 400 kilowatt installations will generate enough onsite power to reduce the company's dependence of the local power grid and decrease its carbon footprint.

In September 2011, Cox Home Security was added to their suite of products listed on their website. This new service uses advanced technologies similar to the home security products offered by other MSOs such as Comcast.

In August 2013, Cox launched a new television platform known as Contour, which features recommendations and a user profile system across multiple devices. In 2015, Cox licensed Comcast's Xfinity X1 platform (which features more extensive integration of video streaming apps, and a voice control remote); it was deployed in 2016, maintaining the Contour naming. Cox stated that at least 1 million subscribers were on the X1-based Contour as of October 2017.

In 2016, Cox Business reached 3 billion in annual revenue.

In August of 2018, Cox announced its acquisition of RapidScale, a managed and hybrid managed cloud services provider.

On September 19, 2019, Cox introduced the Contour Stream player, based on Comcast's Xfinity Flex.

In February 2023, it was announced Cox had acquired the New York-headquartered managed cloud services company, Logicworks for an undisclosed sum.

Transitional logo of Cox and Spectrum following its merger

On May 16, 2025, Cox announced that it had reached an agreement to merge with Charter Communications; the agreement values the combined company at $34.5 billion. The combined company will operate under the Cox Communications name, but will adopt Charter's Spectrum branding for consumer-facing operations. Cox Enterprises will own 23% of the combined company, and replace Liberty Media as the provider of long-term capital to Charter. On February 27, 2026, the Federal Communications Commission approved the acquisition. On August 13, 2026, the California Public Utilities Commission voted to approve the deal, with California having been the final regulatory approval needed for the merger. The merger was completed on August 20, 2026.

== Cox Charities ==
Cox Communications Virginia created the philanthropic Cox Charities to annually provide grants to nonprofits serving youth.

Other state branches of Cox Communications also donate money annually through a Community Investment Grant program. The money comes from employees and goes to 501(c)(3) organizations. These programs can be found in Oklahoma (nearly $165,000 in 2017),

== Privatization ==
In 2004, Cox Enterprises announced its intention to purchase those shares of Cox Communications which it did not already own. A $6.6 billion tender offer was completed in December of that year, and Cox Communications has been a wholly owned subsidiary ever since. This was the second time Cox Communications was taken private by Cox Enterprises.

== Residential services ==
=== Cox Cable TV ===
Cox distributes standard definition and high-definition cable television programming, including Digital Cable. Cox launched Digital Cable on its Orange County system in 1997. In February 2008, Cox started to implement switched digital video (SDV) technology in some of their markets. In late 2014, Cox started notifying customers in their Connecticut market that they would be moving to an All Digital Video platform, requiring a small digital adapter (termed a Cox Mini-Box) for televisions that were previously connected to an analog only signal. This same notification was extended to all other major markets in 2016.

==== Digital video recorder ====
Cox offers digital video recorder service, provided using Motorola, Scientific-Atlanta, Cisco, or previously Moxi equipment depending on the local market.

==== On Demand ====
Cox offers video on demand service in the majority of its markets under the name On Demand. On Demand offerings are fairly standardized, portal-based, and carry VODnets like The Ski Channel, and includes HD offerings and replays of major network series.

=== Cox High Speed Internet ===
As of 2013, Cox offers cable internet service to over 21.8 million people across 18 states, making it the 4th largest provider of cable internet service in the US (based on coverage area).

Cox High Speed Internet won the PC Magazine Readers' Choice Award for High Speed Internet in 2003, 2004, 2005, 2007, and 2011. In 2014, Cox announced they would begin offering 1 Gbit/s internet speeds under the name "G1GABLAST" in Phoenix, Las Vegas and Omaha, with plans to begin offering it in the rest of their service areas by the end of 2016.

In fall 2016, Cox first launched its Panoramic WiFi service in San Diego, Orange County and Santa Barbara, and it became available nationwide on June 13, 2017.

=== Cox Digital Telephone ===
Cox offers telephone service in the majority of its services areas. Various technologies, including circuit switched and hybrid VoIP systems, are used depending on service areas. Cox has won multiple J.D. Power and Associates awards for its telephone service.

=== Cox Business ===
Cox Business provides voice, data and video services for more than 260,000 small and regional businesses, including health care providers, K-12 and higher education, financial institutions and federal, state and local government organizations. According to Vertical Systems Group, Cox Business is the fourth-largest provider of business Ethernet services in the U.S.-based on customer ports and the company ranked highest among small and mid-size business data service providers in J.D. Power and Associates telecommunications studies in 2006, 2008 and 2010. In 2013, Cox Business had the third largest business-facing enterprise by revenue (of cable providers who provide business services), with $1.2 billion in revenue as of the third quarter of 2013.

Cox Business is an early adopter of Voice over IP technology and, in 2007, Cox became the first cable provider in North America to deploy a fully owned and managed IP telephony service for businesses, Cox Business VoiceManager.

=== Defunct Cox Wireless ===
Cox previously offered mobile phone and wireless services in four United States markets including Orange County, California, Hampton Roads, Virginia, Oklahoma City, Oklahoma, and Omaha, Nebraska. Cox marketed their wireless service as 'Unbelievably Fair' due to a wireless plan it offered which returned money for unused minutes which it called "Moneyback Minutes." This allowed customers to receive up to $20 per month added back to their bill in the event that the customer had leftover minutes. Cox Wireless offered a full range of devices manufactured by Motorola, Samsung, HTC, Kyocera, and LG.

Cox Wireless utilized Sprint's voice and 3G networks and also had planned to build out their own 4G LTE network.

On May 24, 2011, Cox Communications announced it would decommission its plans to build a 3G wireless network, and would instead offer Sprint service to half of its current footprint and operate as a Sprint MVNO by the end of 2011.

On November 15, 2011, Cox Communications announced it would halt sales of all its wireless branded products and existing Cox branded wireless operations would be decommissioned by March 30, 2012. Cox eventually also retracted its plans to offer wireless services reselling Sprint service as an MVNO.

== Carriage controversies ==
=== News Corporation dispute ===
On January 1, 2000, Cox was involved in a retransmission consent dispute with News Corporation (the parent company of the Fox broadcast network, now owned by Fox Corporation), pulling four Fox owned-and-operated stations, after retransmission consent talks between News Corp. and Cox broke down, reportedly because Fox had denied permission for Cox to broadcast programming on its O&O stations unless Cox gave it two channel slots on its digital cable service. The affected stations were WJW-TV in Cleveland, Ohio (now owned by Nexstar Media Group), KTBC in Austin, Texas, KRIV in Houston, Texas, and KDFW in Dallas-Fort Worth, Texas, off its cable systems in those areas; another Fox O&O WHBQ-TV in Memphis (itself now owned by Rincon Broadcasting Group) was also pulled from its Jonesboro, Arkansas, system (of the mentioned systems; only the Cleveland metropolitan area continues to be served by Cox; the Texas systems were later bought out by Time Warner Cable (now Spectrum) and Comcast; the Jonesboro system was sold to Suddenlink Communications in May 2006). The removal of those stations, which were temporarily replaced with premium service Starz! Family (which was made available to subscribers for free), blacked out Fox programming to 425,000 Cox customers. The blackout lasted six days as the two sides came to an agreement on January 6, and the Fox-owned stations were brought back to the systems. Cox gave $1 refunds of their January cable bill to roughly 90,000 subscribers in Texas and Arkansas as compensation.

=== LIN TV-Cox dispute ===
In a separate dispute (clumped with the above dispute by media outlets as the "Cox vs Fox" dispute) that occurred around the same time, customers in Hampton Roads, Virginia lost access to LIN TV-owned Fox affiliate WVBT (channel 43) on January 1, 2000; retransmission talks between WVBT and Cox broke down, reportedly due to a demand by WVBT to be placed somewhere between channels 2 and 14 (it had been broadcast on channel 43). Cox refused to move WVBT to a lower channel number; the channel space was filled in the interim by pay channel HBO Family. It was not until February 5 of that year that the station resumed on Cox's Hampton Roads system (remaining on channel 43), after an agreement was reached during a ten-hour arbitration session. Cox did not offer rebates to its 335,000 subscribers in Fairfax County, Virginia, and Cleveland, Ohio, who also lost their Fox stations.

=== Nexstar dispute ===
On January 29, 2016, seventeen Nexstar Broadcasting stations were dropped by Cox after failing to reach a new retransmission deal. The contract had expired on December 31, 2015, but the two companies allowed talks to continue until January 22, 2016. The channels were replaced by a screen which accused Nexstar of "demanding a significant fee increase". In Las Vegas, where the dispute threatened to black out Super Bowl 50 due to local CBS station KLAS-TV being affected by the dispute, Cox announced on February 3, 2016, that it would offer a free preview of the game's Spanish-language broadcaster, ESPN Deportes, over Super Bowl weekend. The next day, Cox reached a new deal with Nexstar, and the stations were restored.

=== Neighborhood-wide speed decreases ===
In 2020, Cox lowered the upstream bitrates of entire neighborhoods from 35 Mbit/s to 10 Mbit/s, because they determined that individual users within the neighborhoods had excessive usage.

== Copyright lawsuits ==
=== BMG Rights Management ===
On December 17, 2015, Cox was held responsible for the copyright infringements of its subscribers according to a ruling from a federal jury in the United States District Court for the Eastern District of Virginia. The ISP was found guilty of willful contributory copyright infringement and ordered to pay music publisher BMG $25 million in damages. This verdict was reaffirmed by the judge on August 8, 2016. On February 14, 2017, Cox was ordered to additionally pay $8.5 million in costs. On November 7, 2016, Cox appealed to the United States Court of Appeals for the Fourth Circuit and on February 1, 2018, the court overturned the $25 million verdict due to erroneous jury instructions but upheld its loss of safe harbor protections due to not having a meaningful repeat infringer policy. On August 27, 2018, before the case was scheduled to be tried for a second time, both parties agreed to a confidential settlement.

=== Sony Music, et al. ===
On July 31, 2018, a billion dollar lawsuit was filed against Cox in the same court, before the same judge that handled the BMG case, by 53 record labels, including Sony, Universal, and Warner Brothers. On December 19, 2019, the jury ruled against Cox and awarded $1 billion to the record labels. On June 2, 2020, the judge ruled the jury's verdict is not excessive but also ruled that damages should be issued per work, not per copyright, as a single song, such as a mashup, may have multiple copyrights. However, on January 12, 2021, the court backtracked on this point because Cox did not raise it during the jury trial, and thus upheld the $1 billion verdict. The case was appealed to the Fourth Circuit on May 24, 2021. While pending, Cox filed an additional motion for relief with the district court on December 27, 2021, alleging concealed evidence that came to light in a separate lawsuit by the record labels against Charter. This motion was denied on March 23, 2022. In February 2024, the Fourth Circuit overturned the verdict, ruling that Cox was liable for contributory infringement but not for vicarious infringement. The Fourth Circuit vacated the $1 billion award and remanded the case to be heard by a second jury to reassess the damages. On March 25, 2026, the Supreme Court, in Cox Communications, Inc. v. Sony Music Entertainment, issued a decision 9–0 that Cox was not liable for contributory infringement, reversing the Fourth Circuit's decision.

== Marketing ==
One of Cox's marketing trademarks is a fictional animated "spokesman" character named "Digital Max", used from 2005 through 2008. The phasing out of Digital Max in 2008 was followed by the introduction of the "Digeez", little digital helpmates featured in many of Cox Communications' brand commercials until 2013. In 2023, Cox Mobile introduced a CGI sheep named Annie.

== See also ==
- List of United States telephone companies
