= Time Warner Cable =

American cable telecommunications company (1962–2016)

Time Warner Cable Enterprises LLC
- Final logo used from 2010 to 2016

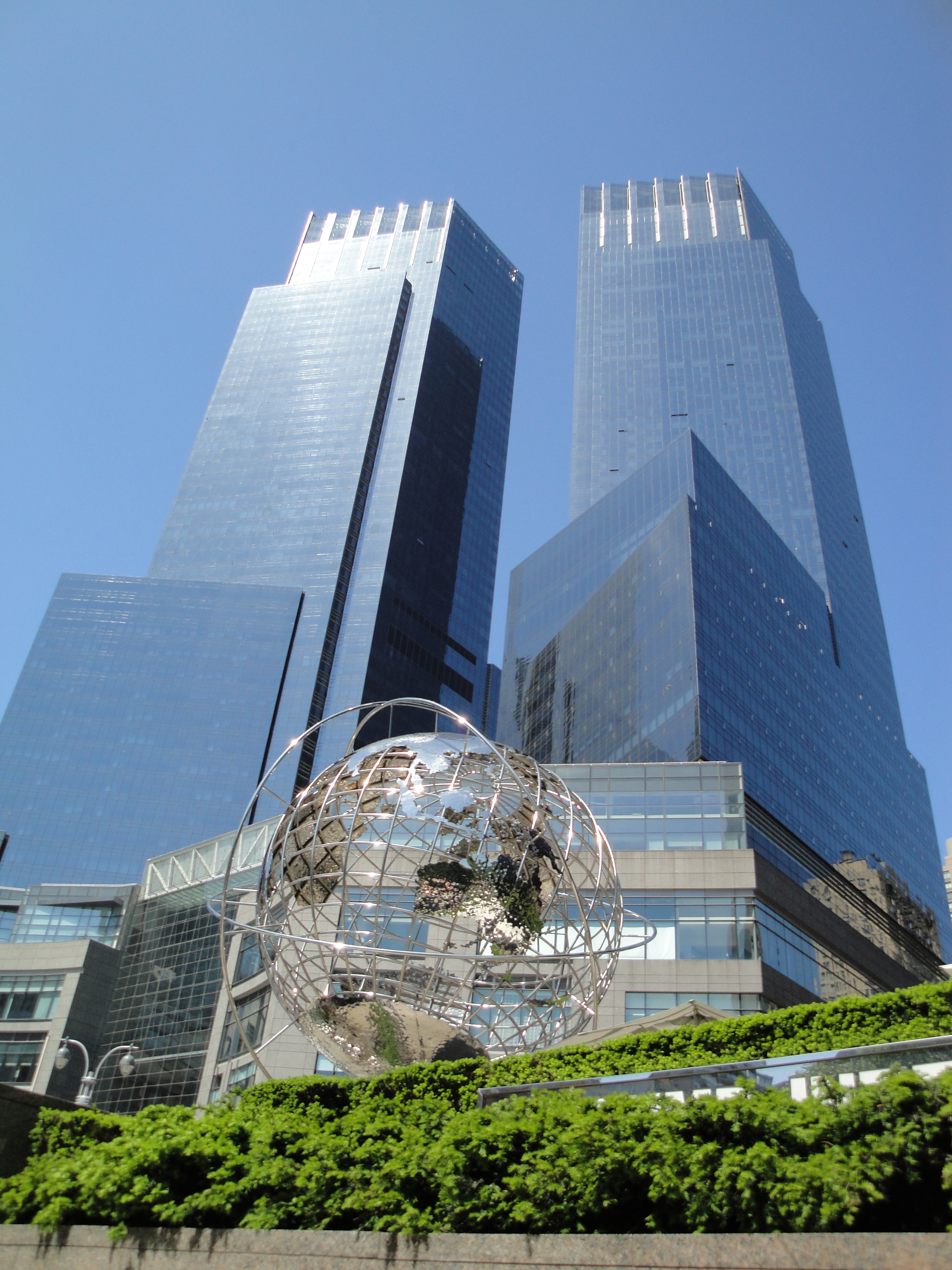
- Time Warner Center, formerly the headquarters of the company in New York City. It was shared by its namesake, but then unrelated company, Time Warner.
- Formerly: Television Communications Corp. (1962–1973); Warner Cable (1973–1979, 1986–1992); Warner-Amex Cable (1979–1986)
- Type: Public
- Traded as: NYSE: TWC
- Industry: Telecommunications; Mass media
- Predecessor: American Television and Communications (1968–1991)
- Founded: 1962; 64 years ago (as Television Communications Corp.); 1973; 53 years ago (as Warner Cable)
- Defunct: May 18, 2016; 10 years ago
- Fate: Acquired by Charter Communications and merged with Bright House Networks to form Charter Spectrum
- Successor: Charter Spectrum
- Headquarters: Time Warner Center, New York City, United States
- Area served: United States
- Key people: Robert D. Marcus (chairman & CEO)
- Parent: Kinney National Company (1972); Warner Communications (1972–1990); American Express (1979–1986); Time Warner (1990–2009)
- Subsidiaries: Time Warner Cable Inc.

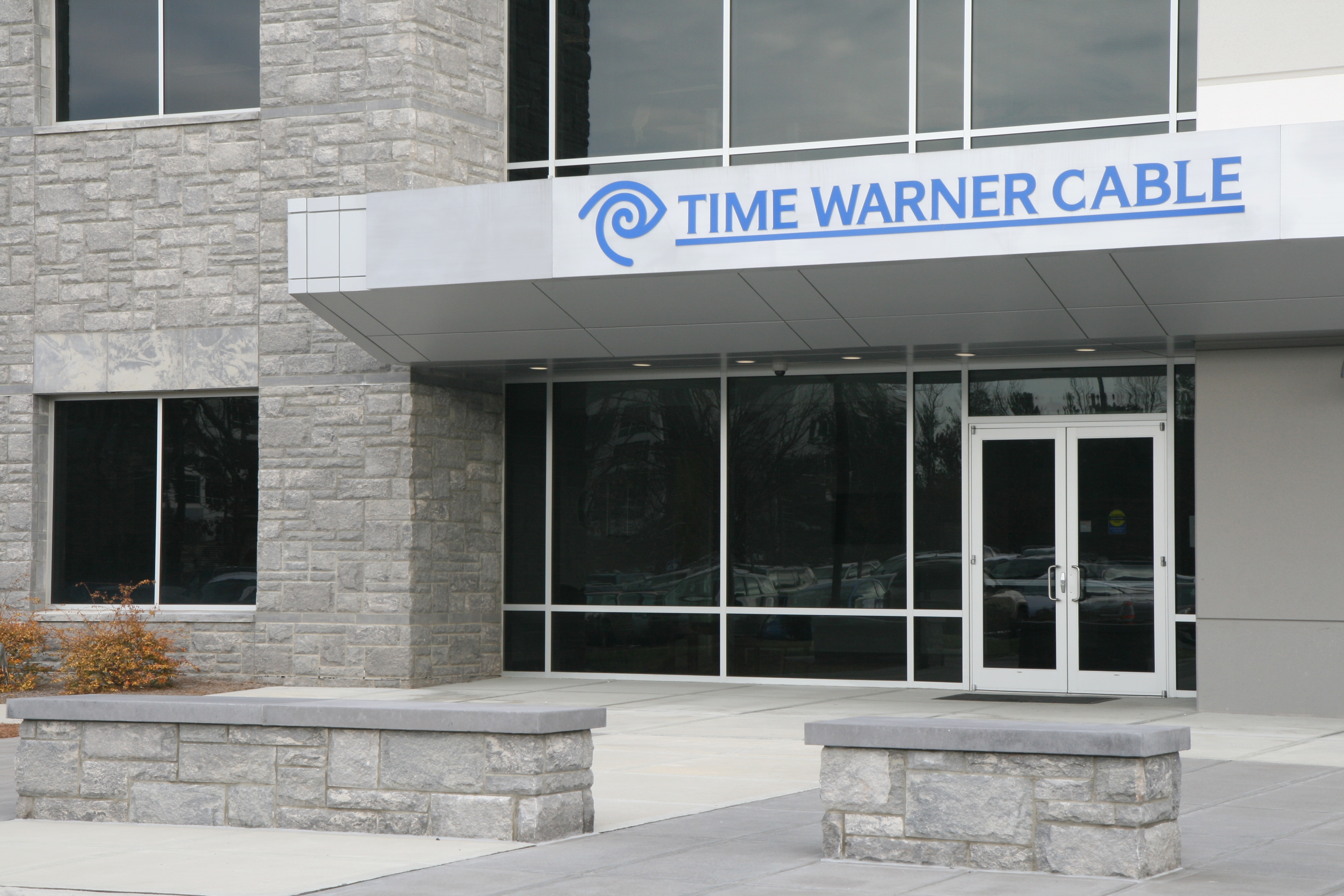
Time Warner Cable building entrance in Morrisville, North Carolina

Time Warner Cable Enterprises LLC was an American cable television company. Before it was acquired by Charter Communications on May 18, 2016, it was ranked the second largest cable company in the United States by revenue behind only Comcast, operating in 29 states. Its corporate headquarters were located in the Time Warner Center in Midtown Manhattan, New York City, with other corporate offices in Stamford, Connecticut; Charlotte, North Carolina; and Herndon, Virginia.

It was controlled by Warner Communications, then by Time Warner (later known as WarnerMedia and presently Skydance). The company had spun off its cable operations in March 2009 as part of a larger restructuring. From 2009 to 2016, Time Warner Cable was an entirely independent company, continuing to use the Time Warner name under license from its former parent company (including the "Road Runner" name for its Internet service, that was merged into what is now Spectrum Internet).

In 2014, the company was the subject of a proposed purchase by Comcast Corporation, valued at $45.2 billion; however, following opposition to the deal by various groups, along with plans by the U.S. government to try to block the merger, Comcast called off the deal in April 2015. On May 26, 2015, Charter Communications announced that it would acquire Time Warner Cable for $78.7 billion, along with Bright House Networks in a separate $10.1 billion deal, pending regulatory approval.

The purchase was completed on May 18, 2016; Charter had continued to do business as Time Warner Cable in its former markets, but has now re-branded these operations under the Spectrum brand in most markets (a brand of Charter which launched in 2014), though it will continue to offer the roadrunner.com email addresses and adelphia.net email addresses to new customers.

== History ==
Evolution of Spectrum
- 1898: James M. Cox established a company that grew into Cox Enterprises after he bought the Dayton Evening News
- 1962: Over the next several decades, Cox grew from a local newspaper business into a diversified conglomerate company and established Cox Communications
- 1973: Warner Communications brought together its smaller cable units and began broadcasting The Movie Channel
- 1977: American Express and Warner Cable entered into a joint venture to fund early Pay Television networks, but within eight years, the subsidiary was sold to Viacom
- 1989: Time Inc. and Warner Communications merged into a single company called Time Warner, forming what was the world's largest media conglomerate
- 1992: Time Warner Cable was established as the merged cable unit of Time Warner, and until 2016, it was the second-largest American cable company by subscribers
- 1993: Charter Communications was founded and it merged with Marcus Cable in 1997
- 2001: Heavy debt led to AT&T selling its cable division to Comcast while Liberty Media was spun off to comply with regulations
- 2003: Bright House Networks, a former partnership between Time Warner Cable and Advance Publications, began offering its own standalone services
- 2007: Time Warner Cable acquired parts of the bankrupt Adelphia Corporation, and succeeds it as a partially public company
- 2009: Time Warner spun off its majority interest in Time Warner Cable to focus on being a pure-play entertainment company
- 2014: Several years after emerging from bankruptcy, Charter launched Spectrum as its consumer-facing brand
- 2016: After Comcast withdrew from its attempted buyout of TWC, Charter acquired both Time Warner Cable and Bright House Networks for $89 billion
- 2024: Charter surpassed Comcast as the largest Pay-TV provider by customers
- 2026: After merging with Cox and acquiring Liberty Broadband, the combined entity is set to retire the "Charter" name.

=== Background ===
By 1971, more than five million American homes had cable television from 2700 cable systems. As cable's popularity grew, Time-Life sold its five television stations and began investing in cable systems such as Sterling Manhattan. Time Warner Cable traces back to two cable entities owned by Time and Warner Communications respectively in the 1970s; American Television and Communications, which was established in 1968, and would be acquired by Time in 1977; and Warner Cable, established in 1973.

Warner Cable would eventually diversify into channels with the formation of Warner Cable Communications in 1977, creating channels for its cable systems such as Pinwheel and Star Channel, and original series such as Sight on Sound; these would eventually be officially launched as Nickelodeon and The Movie Channel in 1979, and MTV in 1981 respectively. In 1979, American Express was brought in to form a joint-venture cable network and cable television firm called Warner-Amex Satellite Entertainment, and eventually Warner Cable was renamed to Warner-Amex Cable. WAC would eventually create the QUBE interactive service until it was shut down in 1984.

On June 25, 1984, it was announced that the channels would be spun off into a public-traded corporation known as MTV Networks Inc.; which was eventually purchased by Viacom International a year after.

In December 1986, American Express sold its half ownership of Warner-Amex Cable back to Warner Communications; reverting the name to Warner Cable.

=== Merged company ===
In the late 1980s, Warner Communications, which was in financial trouble at the time, planned to merge with Time Inc; which would lead to ATC becoming a sibling to Warner Cable. After a delay in the deal, Warner Communications officially merged with Time Inc. to create Time Warner in 1990; ATC & Warner Cable would eventually become part of a new division known as the Time Warner Cable Group. This was in large part because 18% of ATC was still owned by outside shareholders.

Time Warner Entertainment bought out the remainder of ATC in 1992, after which both cable divisions were merged and place in Time Warner Entertainment Company, L.P. (TWEC L.P.), a new limited partnership with Toshiba and C Itoh & Company, which also included Warner Bros., and Home Box Office, Inc.

In 1993, telephone company US West purchased a 25% in TWEC L.P., including Time Warner Cable; this was in part to finance a joint venture, eventually named TW Telecom, intended to build up a fiber-optic communication infrastructure, as well as provide additional cash for Time Warner to upgrade their cable systems. Another cited benefit was that TWC could market telephone service provided by US West alongside their cable television services

In 1995, the company launched the Southern Tier On-Line Community in Elmira, New York, a cable modem service later known as Road Runner High Speed Online. That year, talks began that would later result in Warner's acquisition of Paragon Cable. Glenn Britt (1949–2014) was the CEO from 2001 until December 2013.

Time Warner retained Time Warner Cable as a subsidiary until May 26, 2010, when it was spun off as an independent company. Prior to the spin-out, Time Warner had held an 84% stake in Time Warner Cable. Shareholders other than TW received 0.083670 shares for each share already owned. This move made Time Warner Cable the largest cable operator in the United States owned solely by a single class of shareholders (without supervoting stock).

Time Warner Cable launched DVR service in the Houston area in 2004. (TWC's Houston-area cable systems are now owned by Comcast, the parent company of NBCUniversal.) When first launched, it used Scientific-Atlanta set-top boxes with DVR.

In June 2009, Time Warner Cable unveiled a concept known as "TV Everywhere"—a means of allowing multi-platform access to live and on-demand content from television channels that is tied to a user's television subscription.

=== Sale to Charter Communications and company closure ===
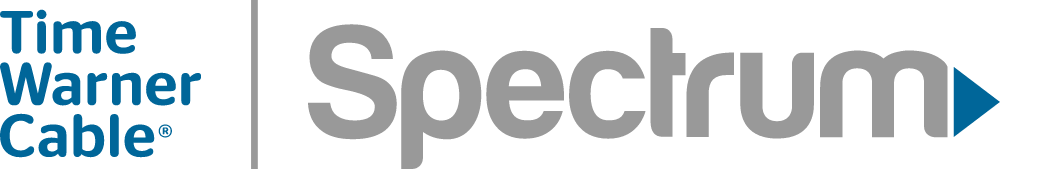
Time Warner Cable Spectrum logo used as a transition period from 2016 to 2017

It was first reported in October 2013 that Time Warner Cable was exploring a sale of the company, possibly to Charter Communications. However, on November 22, 2013, reports surfaced that Comcast expressed interest in acquiring Time Warner Cable. Both companies were said to be placing bids for the company. Charter reiterated its interest in purchasing Time Warner Cable and increased its bid on January 14, 2014. On February 12, 2014, it was reported that Comcast had reached a deal to acquire TWC in an overall deal valued at $45.2 billion, pending regulatory approval.

The proposed merger was met with prominent opposition from various groups, showing concerns that the sheer size of the combined company would reduce competition and would give Comcast an unprecedented level of control over the United States' internet and television industries, increased leverage in the distribution of NBCUniversal content, hamper over-the-top services, and lead to higher prices for its services. In April 2015, it was reported that the U.S. Department of Justice was preparing to file an antitrust lawsuit against the companies in a bid to halt the merger, primarily because the merged company would have controlled 57 percent of the nation's broadband capacity. On April 24, 2015, Comcast officially announced that it had called off the merger.

On May 25, 2015, Bloomberg News reported that Charter was "near" a deal to acquire TWC for $195 a share. Charter had been involved in the Comcast/TWC merger, as the companies planned to divest around 4 million subscribers to Charter in order to reduce the combined company's market share to an acceptable level. The next day, Charter officially announced its intent to acquire Time Warner Cable in a deal valued at $78.7 billion, and confirmed that it would also continue with its proposed, $10.1 billion acquisition of Bright House Networks. The deal was subject to regulatory approval, although due to the relatively smaller size of the companies and their media holdings, the deal was expected to face less resistance than the Comcast/TWC merger.

The acquisition was completed on May 18, 2016. In 2017, Charter stopped using the TWC and BHN branding and fully integrated the two services' subscribers into the Spectrum brand, which was originally debuted in 2014 to market Charter's services.

== Services ==
As of second quarter 2009, there were 14.6 million residential basic cable subscribers, 8.8 million Digital cable subscribers, 8.7 million Road Runner residential subscribers, 2.5 million DVR subscribers, and 4.5 million residential Digital Phone subscribers, which makes it the fifth-largest landline phone provider in the United States.

As of 2013, Time Warner Cable's business division had the second largest business-facing enterprise by revenue (of cable providers who offer business services), with $1.7 billion in revenue as of the third quarter of 2013. Total revenue for 2012 was $1.9 billion.

Prior to Time Warner Cable merging with Charter Communications, they offered a total of 5 tiers of internet speeds, which are listed below:

- ELP (Everyday Low Price, $14.99) - Up to 2 MB/s (would have to request to get, not actively offered/advertised)
- Standard - Up to 10 MB/s
- Turbo - Up to 20 MB/s
- Extreme - Up to 30 MB/s
- Ultra - Up to 50 MB/s

Prior Time Warner Cable internet charges/fees:

Time Warner Cable charged a modem lease fee what was $10/month and offered free WiFi with their service if requested in lieu of what Spectrum does today, what is giving the modem for free and charging $5/month for WiFi service. For Time Warner Cable, customers could purchase their own modem to alleviate that charge, along with today, Spectrum allows their customers to purchase their own router to alleviate the WiFi charge.

== Naming rights ==
Spectrum Center, formerly Time Warner Cable Arena, is located in Charlotte, North Carolina, the home of the NBA's Charlotte Hornets. In April 2008, the then-Bobcats reached a naming rights deal with Time Warner Cable, the Charlotte area's major cable television provider; the arena was named for the cable provider in exchange for the release of the team's television rights, which had been on the TWC co-owned Carolinas Sports Entertainment Television for its first season, which failed to find much cable coverage in the Charlotte market outside of Time Warner Cable systems and went dark after a year, and then News 14 Carolina which was limited to only the North Carolina side of the market, until the arena naming rights deal was made. The team moved to the new Fox Sports South sub-feed Fox Sports Carolinas and SportSouth (now Fox Sports Southeast) with the 2008–09 season, allowing coverage through both the Carolinas. Shortly after being acquired by Charter, the arena was renamed to Spectrum Center.

On March 9, 2007, Time Warner Cable, which provided service to the northeastern Wisconsin area, signed a 10-year naming rights deal for the home field of the Wisconsin Timber Rattlers, a minor league baseball team and affiliate of the Milwaukee Brewers, based in Grand Chute, a suburb of Appleton. The team and Time Warner Cable mutually agreed to end the rights deal after the 2013 season, and the venue is now known as Neuroscience Group Field at Fox Cities Stadium, named for a local neurology practice.

== Acquisitions ==
=== Adelphia ===
On July 31, 2006, Time Warner Cable and Comcast completed a deal to purchase practically all of Adelphia's assets for $17 billion. Time Warner Cable gained 3.3 million of Adelphia's subscribers, a 29 percent increase, while Comcast gained almost 1.7 million subscribers. Adelphia stockholders received 16% of Time Warner Cable. Time Warner Cable went public effective February 13, 2007, and the company began trading on the New York Stock Exchange on March 1, 2007.

In addition to Adelphia's coverage being divided up, Time Warner Cable and Comcast also agreed to exchange some of their own subscribers in order to consolidate key regions. An example of this is the Los Angeles market, which was mostly covered by Comcast and Adelphia (and some areas of the region already served by TWC), is now under Time Warner Cable. Philadelphia had been split between Time Warner Cable and Comcast, with the majority of cable subscribers belonging to Comcast. Time Warner Cable subscribers in Philadelphia were swapped with Comcast in early 2007. Similarly, the Houston area, which was under Time Warner, was swapped to Comcast, while Dallas was changed to Time Warner Cable (RR). In the Twin Cities, Minneapolis was Time Warner Cable and Saint Paul was Comcast. That whole market is now Comcast.

=== NaviSite ===
Time Warner Cable purchased NaviSite (NAVI), a company providing cloud and hosting services, on February 1, 2011, for $230 million, roughly equating to $5.50 per share.

=== Insight Communications ===
On August 13, 2011, Time Warner Cable announced its purchase of Insight Communications for $3 billion acquiring Insight's 760,000 subscribers nationwide. The merger was completed February 29, 2012, and as of June 2013 all of Insight Communications was absorbed into Time Warner Cable.

=== DukeNet Communications ===
On October 7, 2013, Time Warner Cable announced that it has agreed to acquire DukeNet Communications LLC for $600 million. DukeNet provides data and high-capacity bandwidth services to wireless carrier, data center, government, and enterprise customers in the Southeast.

== Advance/Newhouse and Time Warner Entertainment (Bright House Networks spin off) ==
Some of the regional cable system clusters operated by Time Warner Cable were owned by the Time Warner Entertainment – Advance/Newhouse Partnership (TWEAN). In 2002, Advance/Newhouse Communications, unhappy with some of the operating policies of Time Warner Cable in the AOL Time Warner era, forced a restructuring of the TWEAN partnership such that Advance/Newhouse would actively manage and operate a portion of the jointly owned cable systems equal to their percentage of equity. Under this arrangement, Advance/Newhouse enjoys the proceeds of their actively managed systems rather than simply a percentage of the partnership's total earnings. The majority of the affected systems were in the Indianapolis, Tampa, and Orlando markets under the Bright House Networks brand.

The transactions proposed by Charter were approved, TWC and Bright House Networks have been absorbed into Charter.

== Controversies ==
=== Bandwidth metering ===
Between 2008 and 2012, Time Warner Cable conducted a series of trials that metered data use and applied usage-based billing—introducing tiered monthly allowances with overage charges alongside its existing unlimited flat-rate broadband plans. The first pilot launched in Beaumont, Texas, in mid-2008, assigning customers to service tiers with set monthly caps and overage fees for excess usage. In April 2009, TWC announced metered data plan expansions into Rochester, New York, Greensboro, North Carolina, Austin, Texas, and San Antonio, Texas. In response, groups formed in opposition to the rollout, including Stop TWC and Stop The Cap. On April 7, 2009, then US Congressman Eric Massa called on TWC to eliminate its broadband Internet cap. The company ultimately deferred rollout amid the public criticism and organized opposition.

In February 2012, Time Warner Cable again began to experiment with metered data usage and introduced a voluntary "Essentials" plan in its southern Texas market. The plan offered a 5 GB allowance, a $5 monthly discount, $1 per additional gigabyte (capped at $25), and an online usage meter. The company maintained an option to revert to unlimited service at any time.

=== Signal intrusion and accidental transmission of pornography ===
On March 16, 2010, Time Warner Cable's transmission of their Kids on Demand and Kids Pre-School on Demand channels on systems in eastern North Carolina was interrupted by programming from the adult pay television channel Playboy TV for approximately two hours between 6:15 a.m. and 8:15 a.m./EDT, in which a group of nude women talked and posed in a sexually suggestive manner. This accidental display affected Time Warner Cable's digital cable subscribers in four towns in the system's eastern North Carolina cluster, while other areas displayed a black screen. A Time Warner Cable spokesperson said in a statement to Raleigh CBS affiliate WRAL, "It was a technical malfunction that caused the wrong previews to be shown on our kids' on-demand channels. Unfortunately, it hit at the worst possible time on the worst possible channels." A Time Warner Cable executive said normal monitoring procedures did not take effect because the glitch affected only a few areas.

== Cable clusters ==
Time Warner Cable logo used until 2010. The "Business Class" division continued to use this logo until the Charter acquisition.

- West Coast cluster
  - California – Barstow, Desert Cities, Orange County, Los Angeles, San Bernardino, San Diego
  - Hawaii (operating as Oceanic Time Warner Cable)
- Midwest cluster
  - Kansas – Kansas City, Overland Park, Olathe, Shawnee
  - Missouri – Kansas City, Independence, Lee's Summit
  - Nebraska
  - Ohio – Akron, Bowling Green/North Baltimore, Canton, Cincinnati, Cleveland, Columbus, Dayton, Findlay/Lima, and Youngstown
  - Kentucky – Lexington, Louisville, Northern Kentucky, Ashland
  - Pennsylvania – Erie County, Sharon, Franklin
  - Wisconsin – Green Bay and Milwaukee
- Northeast cluster
  - Maine
  - New Hampshire – Berlin, Keene
  - Massachusetts – Athol, Pittsfield
  - Upstate New York
- The Carolinas cluster
  - North Carolina – Charlotte, Raleigh, Greensboro, and Wilmington
  - South Carolina – Columbia, Sumter, Florence, Summerville, Hilton Head and Myrtle Beach.
- New York cluster
  - New Jersey – Bergen County, Hudson County
  - New York – New York City (Manhattan, Queens, Staten Island, most of western Brooklyn); Mount Vernon (Westchester County, rest of county is served by Cablevision)
- Texas cluster
  - Texas – Arlington, Austin, Beaumont/Port Arthur, Corpus Christi, Dallas, El Paso, Fredericksburg, Harlingen, Killeen/Temple, Laredo, Rio Grande Valley, San Antonio, Waco, and Wichita Falls
    - coincidentally, the Irving-Grapevine-Coppell-Lewisville cluster had been under Time Warner Cable's control upon acquisition of Paragon Cable. This was prior to AT&T Broadband's full absorption of that cluster.
- Systems not part of a cluster
  - Alabama – Dothan, Enterprise
  - Arizona – Yuma
  - California – El Centro
  - Colorado – Gunnison, Telluride
  - Idaho – Coeur d’Alene, Moscow
  - Indiana – Terre Haute
  - Maryland – Crisfield
  - Pennsylvania - Lebanon, Elizabethtown, Berks County (became an affiliate of AT&T Broadband in 1999, acquired by Comcast in 2001)
  - Virginia – Accomac, Chincoteague, Franklin, Richlands, Virginia Beach
  - Washington - Kennewick, Pullman, Yakima
  - West Virginia – Clarksburg

== Divisions ==
Time Warner Cable's divisions, from official website:

=== West Region ===
Former logo for "Oceanic Time Warner Cable" division

- PAC West Region
  - Oceanic Time Warner Cable (Hawaii)
  - Time Warner Cable Desert Cities
  - Time Warner Cable San Diego
  - Time Warner Cable Southern California (SoCal)
- Midwest Region
  - Time Warner Cable Kansas City
  - Time Warner Cable Nebraska
  - Time Warner Cable Northeast Ohio & Western Pennsylvania (Akron, Canton, Cleveland & Youngstown; Erie County & Sharon, PA)
  - Time Warner Cable Mid-Ohio (Columbus)
  - Time Warner Cable Southwest Ohio (Dayton; Cincinnati; Lexington, KY; Louisville, KY; Terre Haute, IN; Clarksburg, WV)
  - Time Warner Cable Wisconsin (Milwaukee & Green Bay)
- Texas Region
- Time Warner Cable National (non-clustered systems)

=== East Region ===
- Northeast Region
  - Time Warner Cable Albany
  - Time Warner Cable Buffalo
  - Time Warner Cable Rochester
  - Time Warner Cable Central New York / Syracuse
  - Time Warner Cable New England
  - Time Warner Cable New York City
- Carolinas Region
  - Time Warner Cable Charlotte
  - Time Warner Cable Greensboro
  - Time Warner Cable Eastern Carolina
  - Time Warner Cable Raleigh
  - Time Warner Cable South Carolina (Columbia)
  - Time Warner Cable Fayetteville/Sandhills

=== Former divisions ===
Sold to Comcast

- Time Warner Cable Houma
- Time Warner Cable Houston
- Time Warner Cable Lake City/Live Oak
- Time Warner Cable Mid-South (Memphis, TN, AR, and MS)
- Time Warner Cable Minnesota
- Time Warner Cable Shreveport
- Time Warner Cable St. Augustine/Palatka
- Time Warner Cable Cape Coral/Naples

Divisions that became Bright House Networks

- Time Warner Cable Central Florida
- Time Warner Cable Tampa Bay
- Time Warner Cable Bakersfield
- Time Warner Cable Birmingham
- Time Warner Cable Indianapolis

== Rankings ==
The American Customer Satisfaction Index (ACSI) ranked Time Warner Cable as one of the least liked companies in terms of customer satisfaction in 2011, 2012, 2013, and 2014.

== See also ==
- List of United States telephone companies
- Spectrum Sports
