= Digital Max =

Former advertising mascot of Cox Communications

Digital Max was the official mascot for Cox Communications from 2005 to 2008. He is a CGI human character, apparently intended to appeal to the adult demographic.

Digital Max was created in 2005 by ad agency Doner.

He appeared in all of Cox's major commercial campaigns from June 2005 to 2008. He appeared not only in commercials, but also on Cox's website, where he was featured in a collection of short films.

According to Cox, Max is an "engaging personality" who has resulted in a "gain of appreciation of the Cox brand name." His role in the commercials is sell the companies products, however, in more recent commercials, his approach has been more understated, apparently in an attempt to improve the depth of his character so as to be more appealing to an adult audience.

It was originally announced in June 2005 that Digital Max would guide viewers through the interactive television guide on the company's digital cable television service, however no further reference has been made to this role.

Digital Max has not been featured in any Cox commercials since spring 2008. Digital Max was replaced by little digital helpmates "Digeez".
