= Paragon Cable =

Cable system in Minneapolis, Minnesota

- Industry: Cable television
- Founded: 1980s
- Defunct: 2000
- Fate: Purchased
- Successor: Time Warner Cable; Bright House Networks; Charter Communications
- Headquarters: Minneapolis, Minnesota
- Parent: Houston Industries

Paragon Cable was a cable system based in Minneapolis, Minnesota and was owned by Houston Industries.

== Beginnings ==
Formed in the 1980s, Paragon Cable was the largest cable provider in Minnesota with 177,100 subscribers in the Twin Cities and South Central Minnesota. In the latter years, it has expanded to serve other states, such as California, Oregon, Florida, Texas and in the Borough of Manhattan in New York City above west 79 Street and East 86 Streets (absorbing the former TelePrompter/Group W Cable franchise area).

== Time Warner merger ==
In 1995, Houston Industries, Time Warner, and KBLCOM, Inc. signed an agreement, in which Time Warner Cable would acquire all assets of Paragon Cable and the entire stock of KBLCOM. The deal was finalized in 1999 and all of the Paragon assets were transferred into Time Warner's portfolio, however some headends (like one in Irving, Texas) kept Paragon Cable's verbal ident until late 2000. As for the assets in Florida, they were spun off in 2002 to a new company, Bright House Networks. Some former Paragon systems, such as in Oregon and Texas, would later be sold or swapped to AT&T Broadband, who in turn sold it to Comcast in 2003. Coincidentally, the North Texas cluster formerly served by Comcast was swapped back to Time Warner Cable in August 2006; the Minnesota cluster was transferred to Comcast as part of this transaction.

In 2016, Time Warner Cable and Bright House Networks were acquired by Charter Communications, and was absorbed into the Spectrum brand.
