= DukeNet Communications =

American internet utilities company

- Native name: DukeNet
- Industry: Telecom and internet infrastructure
- Headquarters: Charlotte, North Carolina, United States
- Key people: Brad Davis President and CEO, Tony Cockerham, COO,
- Products: Bandwidth infrastructure and colocation
- Number of employees: 100+
- Website: DukeNet.com

DukeNet Communications was a telecom and internet infrastructure company that serves the southeastern United States. Products include a metro and long haul fiber-optic network capable of 100 Gbit/s bandwidth.

Formed in 1994 as the telecommunications arm of Duke Energy, DukeNet primarily offered wholesale fiber transport services until moving into the newly developing Fiber to the Tower (FTTT) space in 2006. As of 2012, DukeNet is among the top 10 FTTT providers in the United States. In December 2010, Duke Energy and Alinda Capital Partners LLC formed a joint venture to grow DukeNet Communications in the enterprise and data center space. On October 7, 2013, Time Warner Cable (later bought by Charter Communications in 2016) announced that it had agreed to acquire DukeNet Communications LLC for $600 million, and on January 6, 2014, the deal officially closed.
