= Corporate liability =

Laws that create liability for business entities

Corporate liability, also referred to as liability of legal persons, determines the extent to which a company as a legal person can be held liable for the acts and omissions of the natural persons it employs and, in some legal systems, for those of other associates and business partners.

Since corporations and other business entities are a major part of the economic landscape, corporate liability is a key element in effective law enforcement for economic crimes. A 2016 mapping of 41 countries’ corporate liability systems shows wide variations in approaches to liability, and that corporate liability is a dynamic area of legal innovation and evolution.

The term legal person refers to a business entity (often a corporation, but possibly other legal entities, as specified by law) that has both legal rights (e.g. the right to sue) and legal obligations. Because, at a public policy level, the growth and prosperity of society depend to a large extent on the business community, governments must carefully tailor the extent and ways that each permitted form of business entity can be held liable.

Important design elements of corporate liability systems include jurisdiction, successor liability, related and unrelated entities as sources of liability, sanctions and mitigating factors.

Poorly designed or non-existent corporate liability systems can make it impossible to enforce laws effectively and can lead to profound injustices for individuals or entities seeking accountability and redress for wrongdoing.

== Nature of corporate liability ==
Countries can base their corporate liability systems in criminal or non-criminal law (that is, administrative or civil law) or in both. They can also enact legislation that creates liability for legal persons in specific areas of law (e.g. covering health and safety, and product safety issues). Under this approach, the wording of a statutory offence specifically attaches liability to the corporation as the principal or joint principal with a human agent.

Generally, countries’ approaches to this issue reflect long-standing and diverse legal traditions. For example, Australia and Canada anchor their corporate liability systems in criminal law, while the German and Italian systems are based in administrative law. Some jurisdictions use criminal and civil systems in parallel, thereby expanding options for pursuing legal accountability for legal persons and for making political judgments on when to use the criminal law in order to maximise the impact of those cases that are prosecuted. The United States’ system of corporate liability is an example of one that incorporates both criminal and civil law elements.

== Standards of liability ==
Standards of liability for legal persons help clarify when a legal person can be held liable for an unlawful act. This raises subtle questions: since business entities can only commit crime through the agency of the people (natural persons) they employ or otherwise contract with, under what conditions should culpability be attached to the business entity? Indeed, what does culpability mean for such entities? Can the concepts of knowledge and intent required for mens rea (guilty mind) even be applied to business entities?

Typically, companies are held liable when the acts and omissions, and the knowledge and intent of their employees or business partners can be attributed to the corporation. But again, countries adopt a wide variety of approaches to this attribution. These vary from the all-encompassing approach of strict liability to those that look at the entity’s corporate culture and management systems in order to determine whether these ignored, tolerated or even encouraged criminal activity.

=== Strict liability ===
Strict liability is a standard of liability under which a person (legal or natural) is legally responsible for the consequences flowing from an activity, even in the absence of fault or criminal intent on the part of the defendant. The difficulty of proving a mens rea is avoided by imposing absolute, strict liability, or vicarious liability, which does not require proof that the accused knew or could reasonably have known that their act was wrong, and which does not recognise any excuse of honest and reasonable mistake. When applied to corporate liability, strict liability eases the task of attaching liability to business entities.

=== Identification or ‘controlling mind’ test ===
Under this standard, only the “acts of a senior person representing the company’s ‘controlling mind and will’ can be attributed to the company. This approach has its roots in English law. In a seminal case, Tesco Supermarkets Ltd v Nattrass [1972] AC 153, the House of Lords found that a store manager was not a part of the "directing mind" of the corporation and therefore that his conduct was not attributable to the corporation.

This approach has been criticised because it restricts corporate liability to the acts of directors and a few high-level managers. It may therefore unfairly favour larger corporations, which, because they tend to have more diffuse management and decision-making structures, may be able to escape criminal liability for the acts of employees who manage their day-to-day activities.

A 2016 study of 41 countries’ corporate liability systems shows that meeting the ‘controlling minds’ test is not usually required for liability, though it is almost always sufficient to attribute liability to a company.

=== Aggregation tests and collective knowledge ===
This standard, termed the Doctrine of Collective Knowledge, originated in US law. It holds that the individual knowledge of a legal person’s agents can be aggregated into ‘collective knowledge’ in order to establish corporate liability. In effect, this doctrine is relevant to establishing the knowledge (but not the intent) aspect of mens rea for legal persons. In United States v Bank of New England (1987) 821 F2d 844, the Supreme Court sanctioned the use of the doctrine to uphold the conviction of the Bank of New England for wilfully failing to file reports relating to currency transactions. The Court confirmed the collective knowledge doctrine, arguing that, in the absence of such a principle, business entities could divide the duties of their employees so as to compartmentalise their knowledge, thereby avoiding liability.

Aggregation has been applied in Australian courts, but is rejected in England.

=== Corporate culture and compliance systems ===
Many legal analysts (e.g. Gobert) argue that if a corporation fails to take precautions or to show due diligence to avoid committing a criminal offence, this will arise from its culture, where attitudes and beliefs are demonstrated through its structures, policies, practices, and procedures.

This approach rejects the notion that corporations should be treated in the same way as natural persons (i.e. looking for a "guilty" mind), and advocates that different legal concepts should underpin the liability of fictitious legal persons. These concepts reflect the structures of modern corporations, which are more often decentralised and where crime is less to do with the misconduct by or incompetence of individuals, and more to do with management and compliance systems that fail to address problems of monitoring and controlling risk.

Many corporate liability systems consider that corporate culture and the management and compliance systems adopted by companies are relevant to understanding culpability. Such considerations may enter as an element of the offense (so that prosecutors must prove that management and compliance systems were inadequate) or as an element of defence for the company (wherein the company must show that its systems were adequate). Some countries do not permit management and compliance systems to preclude liability, but allow them to be considered as mitigating factors when imposing sanctions.

=== Benefit test ===
Before they will impose liability on a legal person, some countries require that the natural person who commits the offence does so with the intent to benefit the legal person. Across countries, numerous variations on the benefit test exist — notably, some require that the legal person actually does benefit from the illegal act.

A benefit test has been applied in the Federal Court of Australia, the House of Lords (now the Supreme Court of England) and the Supreme Court of Canada. Put simply, the test proposes that where a company gains the benefit of an act, it is considered to be attributed with that act. The test is applied differently when an act is performed by a "mind and will", which usually prompts the use of the organic theory, as opposed to an agent, which usually prompts the use of the agency theory.

== Specific issues ==
=== Successor liability ===
The problem of successor liability arises when a company does something that alters its organisation or identity, such as a name change, a merger or an acquisition. Rules on successor liability determine when and how corporate liability is affected by various changes in a company’s organisation or identity. For example, is a company’s liability for bribery extinguished when it is acquired by another company? In the absence of successor rules, companies may be able to avoid liability through reorganisation or by otherwise altering corporate identity. The 2016 study of comparative corporate liability systems shows that successor liability is, in quite a few countries, an under-scrutinised area of law — in some jurisdictions, it may be the case that even cosmetic organisational changes can, from a corporate liability perspective, ‘wipe the slate clean.’

=== Sanctions ===
Sanctions for corporate crime can take a number of forms. First, there are fines, which, in many jurisdictions, are subject to maximum and (in fewer cases) minimum thresholds. Second, confiscation is designed to deprive the sanctioned companies of the proceeds of their crimes. Third, other punitive actions may be taken that deprive the company of certain rights or privileges or that impose certain obligations. Loss of rights may include ineligibility for public subsidies or participation in public procurement processes. Sanctions may also impose monitoring of the company’s legal compliance policies, either by a court or by a court-appointed corporate monitor.’ The combined impact of these sanctions, taken together, is supposed to be deterrence — they should dissuade the sanctioned companies and others from engaging in crime. There is some doubt in many jurisdictions that sanctions are actually set in such a manner as to make them dissuasive.”

=== Fraud ===
In some instances of fraud, the court may pierce the veil of incorporation. Most fraud is also a breach of the criminal law and any evidence obtained for the purposes of a criminal trial is usually admissible in civil proceedings. But criminal prosecutions take priority, so if civil proceedings uncover evidence of criminality, the civil action may be stayed pending the outcome of any criminal investigation.

=== Secondary liability ===
Some crimes are considered inchoate because, like a conspiracy or attempt, they anticipate the commission of the actus reus (the Latin for "guilty act") of the full offence. One option for prosecution would be to treat a corporation as an accomplice or co-conspirator with the employees. In general terms, most states permit companies to incur liability for such offences in the same way as natural persons, so long as there are at least two natural persons involved in the conspiracy and one other accomplice to aid the commission of the offence by a principal.
