= Pivot Wireless =

Pivot Wireless was a cell phone service, created by a joint venture between Sprint Nextel and multiple cable companies.

== Overview ==
Using Pivot, customers were able to access their cable TV guide, email service and watch many national channels using the cell phone. Calls made from a Pivot phone to the home phone were free, and both phones share a voicemail service.

== Support ==
Pivot offered and supported the following phones: LG Muziq (LX-570), LG Fusic (LX-550), Samsung M510, Sanyo SCP8500 (Katana DLX), Palm Treo 755P, Motorola RAZR, Sanyo 6650 (Katana II), Motorola KRZR, Samsung M300.

Pivot was dropped later by many companies after cable companies complained it was too cumbersome operationally.

== See also ==
- Allied Wireless
