= Attempted acquisition of Time Warner Cable by Comcast =

2014–15 failed American business merger

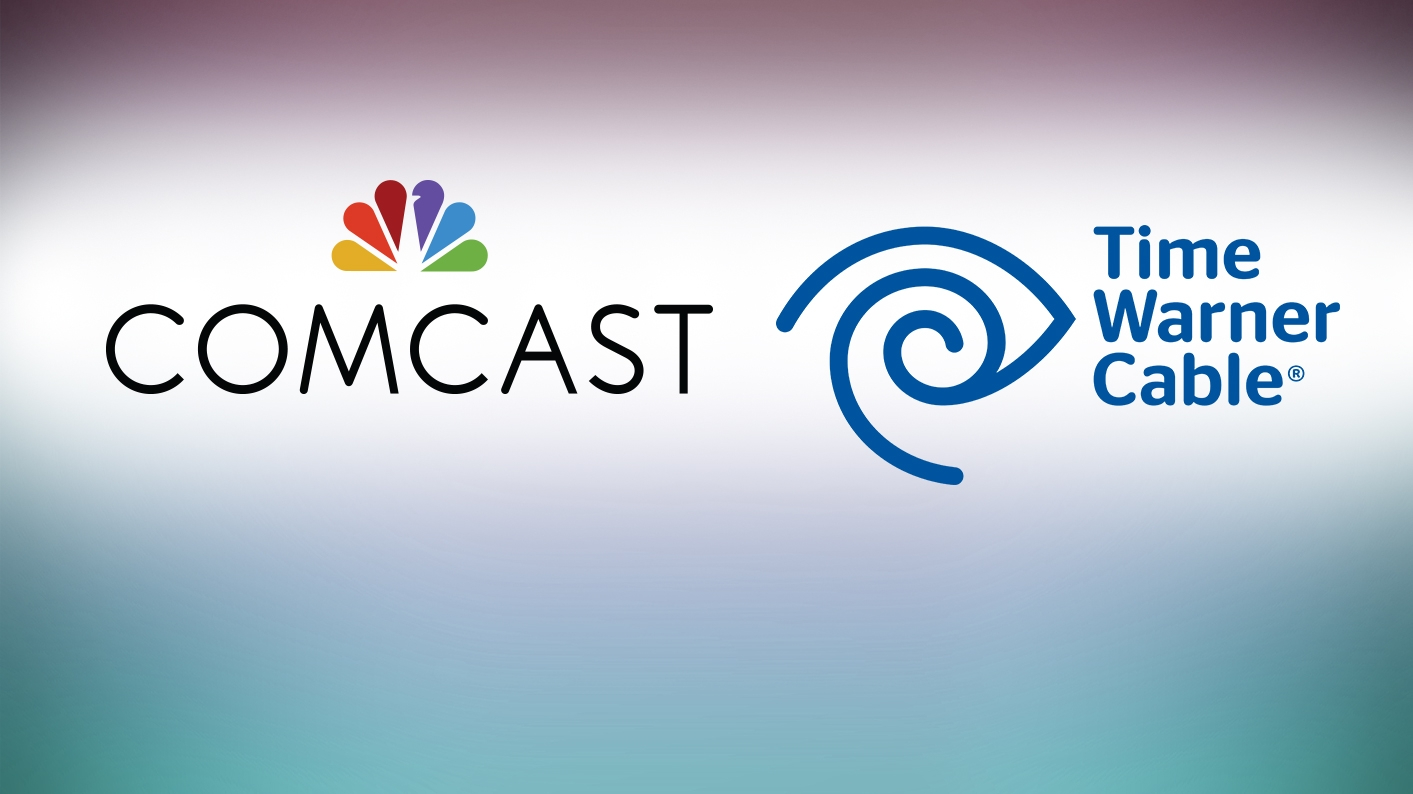
The Comcast and Time Warner Cable logos

On February 13, 2014, Comcast Corporation announced its intent to acquire Time Warner Cable. The deal was proposed to take the form of a stock swap, estimated at the time of announcement to be worth about $45.2 billion. The two companies argued that the merger would increase their overall scale, allowing the company to become more competitive, improve customer service quality, and quicken innovation. The companies also argued that the deal would increase competition in the United States' cable television and internet markets, as they planned to divest subscribers to Charter Communications to regulate the market share of their combined operation.

The deal was supported primarily by Comcast, along with groups that were affiliated with Comcast or received financial support from Comcast or the National Cable & Telecommunications Association. It was also found that some letters in support of the merger were ghostwritten by Comcast representatives. The merger was widely opposed by various individuals, groups, and corporations, arguing that it would reduce competition through consolidation of the cable industry, lead to higher costs of service, and give Comcast greater leverage in how it distributes content owned by its NBCUniversal division to competitors, such as over-the-top services.

Citing the reduction of competition in the broadband and cable industries that would result from the merger, the Department of Justice planned to file an antitrust lawsuit against Comcast and Time Warner Cable in an effort to block it. On April 24, 2015, Comcast announced that it would withdraw its proposal to acquire TWC. Afterward, TWC would enter into an agreement to be acquired by Charter Communications.

== Overview ==
=== Background ===
On November 22, 2013, it was widely reported that Comcast was seeking advice on a possible bid for Time Warner Cable. Charter Communications was also thinking of making an offer. Charter made a total of three attempts to buy Time Warner Cable, offering $37.4 billion on January 13, 2014. Comcast's $45.2 billion offer effectively won Comcast the bidding war, though Charter continued to challenge the acquisition by forecasting difficulties with the regulatory review process. By April 27, however, Charter had backed off its opposition to the deal after reaching a deal to acquire a portion of Time Warner Cable's subscribers as part of it.

Under the deal, Comcast would acquire Time Warner Cable by exchanging each of Time Warner Cable's current 284.9 million shares for 2.875 shares of Comcast's CMCSA stock. In addition, Comcast would divest 1.4 million Time Warner Cable subscribers to Charter Communications for about $7.3 billion, and divest 2.5 million subscribers to a new public company which would be owned 66% by Comcast shareholders, and 33% by Charter, which would manage its network and customers. Finally, Comcast and Charter would swap about 1.6 million subscribers with each other. The proposed merger was approved by Comcast shareholders on October 8, 2014 and Time Warner Cable shareholders the next day.

Comcast touted that the merger would create a "world class media and technology company"; Comcast CEO Brian L. Roberts explained that the companies would be able to innovate quicker, and remain competitive with newer entrants into the industry, such as Verizon and Google Fiber. Similarly, TWC CEO Robert D. Marcus stated that the merger would "[create] a company that delivers maximum value for our shareholders, enormous opportunities for our employees and a superior experience for our customers."

== Details by topic ==
=== Infrastructure ===
Comcast and Time Warner Cable did not directly compete for customers; there was no physical overlap in the respective service areas where they offer services. More generally, there is almost no physical overlap in the service areas of any of the US cable providers. Unlike countries where local-loop unbundling allows multiple companies to offer competing service over the same physical lines, current policy in the United States allows incumbent companies to maintain exclusive use of the telecommunications infrastructure that they own.

In advocating for their 2011 purchase of NBC Universal, Comcast did identify Time Warner Cable as a competitor and cited the nature of their competition as an argument for regulatory approval of that purchase.

=== Internet ===
At the end of 2013, Comcast and Time Warner Cable had about 20.7 million and 11.1 million internet subscribers, respectively. Together, the two companies would have controlled about two-thirds of the broadband cable market, or about 40% of the U.S. wired broadband market as a whole. Comcast noted that the combined companies' share of all U.S. broadband internet, both wired and wireless was 21.5%. At the time of the attempted merger, wireless internet was generally slower, more expensive, and had much lower data caps, so the wireless comparison remained controversial. However, by the 2020s, deployment of 5G meant fixed wireless became competitive with cable, as modern wireless has faster speeds, in some cases exceeding cable, and lacks data caps.

In 2010, Comcast won a lawsuit with the FCC which struck down the agency's net neutrality rules on jurisdictional grounds. As a condition of its acquisition of NBC Universal in 2011, Comcast agreed to abide by the same Open Internet rules that it argued be struck down. Because these rules would be extended to Time Warner Cable customers in the event of a merger, Comcast argued the acquisition would be a benefit for consumers. On the other hand, critics noted that the provision expires in January 2018, and questioned Comcast's record of abiding by legal mandates.

=== Television service ===
As of March 31, 2014, Comcast and Time Warner Cable had 22.6 million and 11.2 million video subscribers, respectively. Together, the two companies served about 33% of paid TV customers in the US.

After the announcement of the merger, Comcast considered selling off about 3 million subscribers. This divestiture would bring Comcast's share of US TV subscribers just below 30%, a threshold that was formerly used by the FCC as a strict limit on the TV market share for one company, before Comcast successfully sued to have the rule overturned by the U.S. Court of Appeals for the D.C. Circuit in August 2009. Comcast reached a deal with Charter Communications in April 2014 to sell Charter both 1.4 million customers and a 33% stake in a company of an additional 2.5 million subscribers.

=== Media properties ===
Time Warner Cable has few media properties, most of which are local news channels such as NY1, and regional sports networks such as Time Warner Cable SportsNet and SportsNet LA. Comcast owns several similar services through NBCUniversal, including New England Cable News and Comcast SportsNet, which serve different markets from TWC's news and sports channels. Both companies also own minority stakes in SportsNet New York and MLB Network.

Time Warner Cable should not be confused with Time Warner Inc. (now known as Warner Bros. Discovery), which owns Warner Bros. Entertainment (including Warner Bros. Television and a 50% stake in The CW), pay TV networks such as HBO and Cinemax, several other national cable channels such as TruTV, CNN and Cartoon Network and other properties which compete with Comcast's NBCUniversal division, but which spun off Time Warner Cable as a completely separate company in March 2009, Time Warner Inc. also spun off AOL in December 2009.

== Regulatory review ==
=== U.S. Congress ===
After initially scheduling the hearing for March 25, the Senate Judiciary Committee hearing on the deal was held on April 9, 2014. The House Judiciary Committee also held a hearing concerning the acquisition on May 8, 2014. The congressional hearings have no direct effect on the outcome of the review process.

=== Federal Communications Commission ===
The FCC's review of the acquisition began on April 8, 2014, when Comcast filed their public interest statement. The FCC review was headed by chairman of the FCC and former cable industry lobbyist Tom Wheeler. Wheeler's appointment in May 2013 was widely praised by the cable industry. Some raised concerns about Wheeler's previous work as the head of the main U.S. cable lobby, the National Cable & Telecommunications Association. Comcast donated $110,000, and Time Warner paid $22,000 for a fundraiser benefitting Mignon Clyburn, an FCC officer.

The FCC timed its review of the merger with a 180-day "shot clock", a non-binding estimate of how long it would take to come to a decision regarding the merger. The clock began on July 10, 2014, when the FCC set a deadline for comments on the merger. From October 3, 2014 to October 29, 2014, the FCC paused the clock at day 85, waiting for Comcast to submit additional information regarding their business practices. From December 22, 2014 to January 12, 2015, the FCC paused the clock at day 105, to give it time to review documents which Time Warner Cable had submitted late. On March 13, 2015 the FCC paused the clock again, waiting for court decisions regarding the public disclosure of information about companies' retransmission consent contracts.

=== Department of Justice ===
The Antitrust Division of the U.S. Department of Justice officially announced that it would be reviewing the merger on March 6, 2014. Concurrent with the announcement, the current head of the antitrust at the DOJ, Bill Baer, recused himself from the review. Baer previously represented General Electric during their sale of NBCUniversal to Comcast. With Baer recused, the DOJ review was led by Principal Deputy Assistant Attorney General Renata B. Hesse and Deputy Assistant Attorney General David Gelfand. A group of about 25 states, through their state attorneys general, are conducting their own probes, either individually or through a multistate review group.

The DOJ commonly uses the Herfindahl index (HHI) to measure market concentration, designating markets between 1,500 points and 2,500 points as "moderately concentrated" and those above 2,500 points as "highly concentrated". By some rough estimates, the merger would have increased the HHI of the US television industry from 1,815 to 2,454, or an increase in 639 points. The merger would have increased the national wired broadband HHI from roughly 1,455 to 2,130. However, the DOJ traditionally considers the effects of transactions on concentration in individual markets, in which Comcast and Time Warner do not compete, and ignores transactions' effects on the national market as a whole.

== Positions on the merger ==
=== Support ===
Comcast and its affiliates were among the strongest supporters of the deal. Comcast vice-president David Cohen stated that the deal was "all about increasing competition and creating more consumer benefit as a result of gaining additional scale." Carl Guardino, CEO of Silicon Valley Leadership Group, which represents Comcast among other companies, said that "there seems to be nothing but upside in this deal".

A coalition of libertarian groups, including Americans for Tax Reform, supported the merger in a letter calling on the FCC and DOJ to "allow the free market to function...without interference". Many of the groups which publicly supported the merger received political or charitable donations from Comcast or the National Cable & Telecommunications Association, leading some to doubt the impartiality of the statements of support. An investigation by The Verge found that some letters of support from state and local level officials were originally written by Comcast employees and forwarded to the FCC with only superficial changes.

=== Opposition ===
The merger of Comcast and Time Warner Cable was widely opposed due to concerns over its impact on the overall market. It was argued that the sheer size of the combined company would reduce competition, would give Comcast an unprecedented level of control over the United States' internet and television industries. It was also argued that the merger would give Comcast increased leverage in the distribution of NBCUniversal content, hamper over-the-top services such as Netflix, and lead to higher prices for its services.

Prominent critics of the deal included technology expert Susan P. Crawford, U.S. senator Al Franken of Minnesota, the city of Lexington, Kentucky, the city of Worcester, Massachusetts, and U.S. representative John Conyers of Michigan. Some companies within the industry expressed opposition to the merger, including DirecTV, Netflix, and Cogent Communications. Prior to reaching a deal to acquire some subscribers of the merged company, Charter Communications also opposed the merger.

Public opinion on the merger was generally negative. A March 2014 Reuters/Ipsos poll found that 52% of Americans believed the deal was bad for consumers, while 22% thought it would be beneficial. An April 2014 poll conducted by Consumer Reports found that the merger was opposed by 56% of the public and supported by 11%, with 32% having no opinion, with 74% of respondents agreeing that a merger "will result in higher Internet and cable prices for everyone." Comcast vice president David Cohen has pointed to faults in the company's customer service as the reason behind much of the opposition from the general public, arguing such concerns are not relevant to the government's review of the deal.

A coalition of 56 consumer-advocacy and public interest groups expressed opposition to the merger, including both the Writers Guild of America, East and Writers Guild of America, West, the Media Alliance, Public Knowledge, and the Parents Television Council. Outside of this group, Consumer Watchdog also opposed the merger.

== Abandonment, aftermath ==
In April 2015, it was reported that the U.S. Department of Justice was preparing to file an antitrust lawsuit against Comcast and Time Warner Cable in a bid to halt the merger, arguing that the merger would reduce the level of competition in the cable television and broadband internet industries. On April 24, 2015, Comcast officially announced that it had called off the merger.

Following the abandonment of the deal, it was reported that a TWC financial advisor had been in talks with representatives from Cox Communications regarding a merger; however, a Cox representative denied that they were exploring a sale, and that the company would "continue to explore any potential growth opportunities that align with our business objectives." On May 26, 2015, Charter Communications announced a $78.7 billion deal to acquire TWC, along with a $10.1 billion deal to acquire Bright House Networks.

== See also ==
- Attempted purchase of T-Mobile USA by AT&T
