= Successor liability =

Liability inherited by a successor entity

In law, successor liability is liability (debt or other obligation) that is inherited by a successor entity after a corporate restructuring. Here, ‘successor’ refers to the entity that exists after the restructuring. ‘Restructuring’ refers to any action that alters the identity or character of a business entity (e.g. a merger). Successor liability is a subset of the law governing corporate liability or liability of legal persons.

A legal person is any person that can do the things a human person is able to do in law – such as enter into contracts, sue and be sued, own property, and so Depending on the jurisdiction, entities such as corporations, other types of firm, partnerships and state-owned enterprises may be treated as legal persons, with both rights and responsibilities under law. Successor liability rules influence how these rights and responsibilities vis-a-vis others are influenced by corporate restructurings.

Under corporate liability law (or possibly other bodies of law, such as employment or environmental law), some countries regulate how liability passes from a ‘predecessor’ entity to a 'successor' entity in the event of such corporate restructurings as a name change, merger or acquisition, division or dissolution. Following such restructurings, successor liability rules determine whether and how the 'successor' or acquiring entity must assume some or all of the predecessor entity's liabilities. Product liability, environmental clean-up, employment law and criminal law are some of the areas in which successor liability may enter into play. Thus, it is an important component of the legal system that supports the structural change needed in dynamic business sectors while also protecting individual and societal interests.

While a restructuring does not automatically give rise to successor liability, the following situations are often considered to be relevant when determining whether or not such liability exists: there is an explicit agreement between the parties on the assumption of some liabilities; the restructuring is considered to be a de facto merger; the restructuring results in the mere continuation of the predecessor’s business; and the transaction underpinning the restructuring was fraudulent and used to escape liability.

Without successor liability, a business entity may avoid liability by reorganising itself or otherwise altering its corporate identity. A comparative law study of successor liability in the context of enforcement of laws criminalising foreign bribery shows that countries have adopted widely different approaches to successor liability in a criminal law context. In some jurisdictions, it is not clear whether successor liability exists at all, opening up the possibility that even minor business reorganisations could 'wipe the slate clean' from the standpoint of criminal law enforcement. Other countries have comprehensive statutory frameworks that address successor liability. Still others rely on established jurisprudence or other legal principles as the legal foundation for successor liability.
