= Successor company =

A successor company takes the business (products and services) of a previous company or companies, with the goal to maintain the continuity of the business. To this end, the employees, board of directors, location, equipment, and even product name may remain substantially the same at the moment of succession.

This form of continuation saves money for the initial ramp-up (employee training, equipment purchase, marketing, etc.). If the previous company was failing, this is a disadvantage for its successors in various respects. If the successor succeeds where the predecessor failed, the company may be called a "phoenix company" ("rising from the ashes"). In general, the successor is not responsible for the liabilities of the predecessor, unless the consent was given to this or a court decides that the succession was for the purpose of shielding assets from liability, or as otherwise restricted by law.

The term successor in business has similar meaning, potentially being used to describe a successor company, but also being used to describe an entity that acquires all or substantially all of the undertakings and assets of another entity, or an entity that results from an amalgamation or merger of other business entities.

In corporate law, successor corporations may be created by mergers and acquisitions or liquidation of existing businesses. In order to conclude whether a corporation is a legal successor of previous businesses, connections between them must be analyzed. Such connections may be found, for example, when the corporations keep nearly the same senior management or there is a close connection between the old and new management. Other contributing indicators include same trade, same workforce, similar company and product names, and substantial asset transfer between successors and predecessors.

There may not be a successor following business liquidation or dissolution.

== See also ==
- Corporate spin-off
- Corporate liability
- Phoenix company
- Successor liability
