= AT&T Broadband =

Cable operations division for AT&T

AT&T Broadband LLC
- Type: Division
- Industry: Cable television
- Founded: 1999; 27 years ago (as AT&T Digital Cable)
- Defunct: 2003; 23 years ago
- Fate: Merged with Comcast
- Successor: Comcast Corporation
- Headquarters: Englewood, Colorado, U.S.
- Parent: AT&T
- Website: broadband.att.com at the Wayback Machine (archived 2000-10-18)

AT&T Broadband LLC was an American digital cable television and telecommunications provider that served as the cable operations division of AT&T. It was founded in March 1999 when AT&T acquired the assets of TCI and renamed it as AT&T Digital Cable. The next year, it was renamed again as AT&T Broadband, and the company had acquired MediaOne as well and became the largest cable operations company in the United States. In 2001, AT&T swapped the cable systems in the San Joaquin Valley region of California, eastern Oregon, northern Utah, and southern Idaho to Cable One; while at the same time acquiring a couple Paragon/Time Warner Cable clusters in Texas and Oregon. Later that same year, it was announced that AT&T Broadband and the Comcast Corporation will be merging their assets into "AT&T Comcast Corporation." The deal was finalized in mid-November 2002 and AT&T Broadband fully merged into Comcast Corporation.

== Merger with Comcast; Acquisition ==
On December 19, 2001, AT&T Broadband and Comcast Corporation announced that they would be merging as a decision was made by their respective Board of Directors. The value of the transaction was $72 billion and jointly had covered over 22 million subscribers across all United States. Originally, the name of the merger company was supposed to be AT&T Comcast Corporation with each company providing 5 members for the Board of Directors, including 2 external members.

In late 2002, AT&T announced that it would go through corporate restructuring. In the middle of November 2002, the deal was finalized and Comcast acquired AT&T Broadband under the name "Comcast Corporation".

== See also ==
- Excite web portal
