= NBC 14 =

NBC 14 may refer to one of the following television stations in the United States:

== Current affiliates ==
- KLAF-LD in Lafayette, Louisiana
- WFIE in Evansville, Indiana

== Formerly affiliated ==
- KLAA (now KARD) in West Monroe, Louisiana (1974 to 1981)
- KLNO/KXAM-TV (now KBVO) in Llano, Texas (1991 to 2009)
  - Was a semi-satellite of KXAN-TV in Austin
