= UPN 13 =

UPN 13 may refer to one of these television stations that were formerly affiliated with the UPN network that broadcast on VHF or cable channel 13:

- KCOP in Los Angeles, California (1995–2006)
- K13VC in Austin, Texas (1998–2000)
