= K13VC =

Television station in Austin, Texas (1989–2003)

- Austin, Texas; United States
- Channels: Analog: 13 (VHF)
- Branding: KVC 13

Programming
- Affiliations: Independent (1989–1998, 2000–2003); Fox Kids (1995–2002); FoxBox (2002–2003); UPN (1998–2000)

Ownership
- Owner: Global Information Technologies Inc. (1989–1994); Argyle Television Holdings (1994); New World Communications (1994–1997); Fox Television Stations (1997–2003); (KTBC License, Inc. (1994–2003))
- Sister stations: KTBC

History
- Founded: August 29, 1986
- First air date: November 30, 1989
- Last air date: March 29, 2003

Technical information
- Facility ID: 35650
- Class: TX
- ERP: 0.098 kW
- HAAT: 298 m (978 ft)
- Transmitter coordinates: 30°18′35.99″N 97°47′34.8″W

K13VC (channel 13) was a low-power independent television station in Austin, Texas, United States, which operated from November 30, 1989, until March 29, 2003. Branded on-air as "KVC 13", it was a sister station of KTBC (channel 7) for most of its history under the ownership of Argyle Television, New World Communications and Fox Television Stations. The station's transmitter was located at One Congress Plaza at the intersection of Congress Avenue and 2nd Street in downtown Austin.

== History ==
=== Early history ===
K13VC first signed on the air on November 30, 1989, as an independent station. The station was founded by Global Information Technologies Inc., a locally based company owned by entrepreneurs Saleem and Carmen Tawil. It originally operated from studio facilities located at One Congress Plaza. K13VC maintained a general entertainment format featuring sitcoms, drama series and cartoons. The station also aired telecasts of the Houston Astros and Texas Rangers.

Initially, K13VC was only available to viewers within five miles (8 km) of downtown Austin. Not long after acquiring the Astros and Rangers rights, K13VC's sports telecasts were placed onto the Austin CableVision system, allowing K13VC's sports telecasts to reach areas of Austin beyond the contour of its limited signal. On January 1, 1992, as part of the settlement of a lawsuit over alleged tampering of programs, KVC joined the system full-time.

=== Duopoly with KTBC ===
On December 21, 1993, Argyle Television Holdings—the new owner of then-CBS affiliate KTBC (channel 7, now a Fox owned-and-operated station) through its $335-million acquisition of the Times Mirror Company's broadcast holdings—announced that it would purchase K13VC from Global Information Technologies for an undisclosed price. On January 4, 1994, one day after the company closed on its purchase of KTBC, Argyle took over management responsibilities for K13VC under a local marketing agreement with Global Information Technologies. The agreement—which resulted in K13VC integrating its operations into KTBC's downtown studios on East 10th and Brazos Streets—allowed KTBC to provide programming, advertising, promotional, and master control services for K13VC. Through the consolidation of that station's operations with Channel 7, K13VC began airing secondary runs of select syndicated programs seen on KTBC; it also utilized K13VC to provide extensive coverage of local and state legislative elections held in November 1993, while allowing KTBC to interrupt network programming only to air brief election updates.

On May 26, 1994, New World Communications announced it would purchase Argyle Television's four full-power stations, including KTBC, as well as K13VC. On January 19, 1995, New World took over the operations of KTBC, K13VC and the other three Argyle stations through time brokerage agreements; the group's purchase of the Argyle properties received FCC approval nearly three months later on April 14.

On July 2, 1995, as part of the switch of most New World-owned stations to Fox, KTBC assumed the Fox affiliation in the Austin market. Although Channel 7 acquired the rights to most of Fox's programming, KTBC and K13VC initially split the local broadcast rights to the network's children's programming block, Fox Kids, as KTBC's station management declined to carry the block's weekday lineup, a move which had become standard practice for the other New World stations that had joined Fox since September 1994. KTBC only took the Saturday morning Fox Kids lineup, and simulcast it in conjunction with K13VC until September 1997, when the former ceded its partial rights to Fox Kids exclusively to Channel 13 and replaced it with real estate, paid and E/I-compliant programs. (K13VC continued to air the weekday children's block until Fox discontinued it, confining Fox Kids programming, to Saturdays on December 31, 2001; it began carrying Fox Kids' successor, the FoxBox, on September 14, 2002, and continued to air that block until the station's shutdown.)

News Corporation acquired New World in 1996, with the purchase closing on January 22, 1997. On October 5, 1998, K13VC became the second station in Austin to become an affiliate of UPN; it assumed the affiliation from the Hill Country Paramount Network (HPN), a regional network of low-power translator stations that also acted as a simulcast feed of WB affiliate KNVA (channel 54, now a de facto owned-and-operated station of The CW) outside of UPN programming. The station also rebranded from "KVC 13" to "UPN 13". The affiliation switch occurred on six days' notice; it allowed UPN programs to be seen on Austin cable, not the case with the HPN setup.

By the summer of 2000, KTBC had opted to drop the UPN affiliation for K13VC. On August 3, Fredericksburg-based KBEJ (channel 2) signed on and took the UPN affiliation away from K13VC. The new KBEJ had a transmitter equidistant from Austin and San Antonio; it was owned by Corridor Television, set up by the Tawil family that had started KVC, and managed by Belo. At that time, K13VC reverted to independent status and returned to its original "KVC 13" moniker, focusing on first-run and off-network syndicated programs, as well as University of Texas, Big 12 Conference and other college sports events. The abrupt disaffiliation elicited complaints from Star Trek: Voyager fans in Austin, who suddenly lost the ability to watch the series' seventh (and final) season, as KBEJ only produced a marginal signal to northern sections of Austin proper and a marginal to non-existent signal in the northern part of the market. Because Time Warner Cable was initially unwilling to place KBEJ on its Austin system (an impasse that lasted until August 2001, after it reached a carriage agreement with the station two months prior), many Voyager fans had to resort to downloading illegal copies online or trading taped copies with friends in other cities with a UPN affiliate to view episodes during the 2000–01 season. Although UPN frowned upon this practice, unofficially the network and parent company Viacom turned a "blind eye" due to the circumstances of the situation.

On March 19, 2003, KTBC management announced that K13VC would cease operations after 13 years on the air. This was because channel 13 had been allotted to Univision Communications to broadcast the digital signal of Killeen-based Univision station KAKW-TV, which had relocated its transmitter facility from Killeen south to a tower near Bertram to serve the Austin market and obtain cable carriage in the area. The digital signal for a full-service TV station such as KAKW had priority over the low-power K13VC license. K13VC signed off permanently at midnight on March 29; some syndicated programs as well as the Big 12 television rights were transferred to KTBC, while many other syndicated shows carried by Channel 13 were unable to find a replacement carrier in Austin. The shutdown resulted in the layoffs of ten station employees and marginally depreciated the overall value of Fox's Austin television properties.
