= KCWX =

Television station in Fredericksburg, Texas

- Fredericksburg–San Antonio– Austin, Texas; United States
- City: Fredericksburg, Texas
- Channels: Digital: 8 (VHF); Virtual: 2
- Branding: KCWX

Programming
- Affiliations: 2.1: Independent with MyNetworkTV; for others, see § Subchannels

Ownership
- Owner: Corridor Television, L.L.P.

History
- Founded: May 15, 1998
- First air date: August 3, 2000
- Former call signs: KBEJ (2000–2006)
- Former channel numbers: Analog: 2 (VHF, 2000–2009); Digital: 5 (VHF, 2009–2025)
- Former affiliations: UPN (2000–2006); The CW (2006–2010)
- Call sign meaning: The CW Texas (former affiliation)

Technical information
- Licensing authority: FCC
- Facility ID: 24316
- ERP: see § Transmitter facilities
- HAAT: see § Transmitter facilities
- Transmitter coordinates: see § Transmitter facilities
- Translator(s): see § Transmitter facilities

Links
- Public license information: Public file; LMS
- Website: www.kcwx.com

KCWX (channel 2) is a television station licensed to Fredericksburg, Texas, United States. It is programmed primarily as an independent station, but maintains a secondary affiliation with MyNetworkTV. Although Fredericksburg is within the Austin media market, the station is officially assigned by Nielsen to the larger San Antonio market, and its signal covers the San Antonio and Bexar County area. KCWX is owned by Austin-based Corridor Television and has main studios in Austin on West Avenue. Its main transmitter is located on the Gillespie–Kendall county line, with additional transmitters in Austin (for full coverage of the market), San Antonio, Hondo, Mountain Home, and Llano.

Channel 2 was inserted into Fredericksburg in 1986, leading to a twelve-way battle for the allotment, which had the potential to serve Austin and San Antonio from one transmitter. In 1993, the Federal Communications Commission review board favored a consortium of former San Antonio Spurs owner Red McCombs and broadcast executive Bob Roth. Roth died in 1995 on a scouting trip near the proposed transmitter site. Appeals from the comparative hearing process continued until 1998, when the commission awarded the permit to Corridor Television, a merger of the McCombs–Roth group and a company owned by the Tawil family of Austin. The group contracted with the Belo Corporation, owner of TV stations in both cities, to run channel 2, which began broadcasting as a UPN affiliate on August 3, 2000. The station also served as a home for San Antonio Spurs basketball games in its first season on the air. The station struggled on several fronts. The station was carried on cable almost from the beginning in San Antonio but was not added for a full year in Austin. By then, the Spurs had moved their games off of KBEJ, citing issues with its signal in the San Antonio market and a decline in ratings.

UPN and The WB merged to form The CW in 2006. KBEJ changed its original sequential call sign to KCWX and became the CW affiliate in the San Antonio market. The new network also affiliated with Austin's ex-WB outlet, KNVA, leading to KCWX's removal from Austin cable systems. In 2010, Corridor lost the CW affiliation to KMYS of San Antonio, and Belo ceased programming the station. Since then, it has been a MyNetworkTV outlet.

== History ==
=== The long road to construction ===
If we can get cable out of Fredericksburg into San Antonio and Austin, we'd have a big market.

— Lesvia Guerra-Cox, one of the applicants for channel 2 through TexStar Communications

In 1986, the Federal Communications Commission (FCC) added a channel 2 assignment to Fredericksburg, located 67 miles (108 km) from Austin and 63 miles (101 km) from San Antonio; the allotment was possible without interfering with channel 2 stations in Nuevo Laredo to the south, Midland to the west, Denton to the north, and Houston to the east. With Fredericksburg located almost halfway between two media markets, the availability of a VHF station that could potentially serve both attracted attention from prospective owners. In June 1987, the FCC designated twelve applicants for comparative hearing. Some of the applicants, notably the Telemundo network, dropped out in the months following the hearing designation order. Administrative law judge Edward Luton made his initial decision on who should be granted the channel out of six contenders in June 1989; he selected Stonewall Television, owned by Marquis Whittington and Robert Simmons. The FCC's review board overturned this decision in 1993 and gave the nod to Fredericksburg Channel 2, a consortium headed by former San Antonio Spurs owner Red McCombs and Bob Roth, a former manager and son of the owner of KONO-TV (channel 12) in San Antonio in the 1950s and 1960s.

As appeals continued on the 1993 decision, tragedy struck. On October 20, 1995, Roth and two executives from the Hearst Corporation took a trip to scout the area and view the proposed transmitter site. The car they were traveling in was involved in a head-on collision south of Stonewall; Roth died at the age of 73. No one was wearing seat belts at the time of the accident.

In 1996, Fredericksburg Channel 2 merged with one of its five competing applicants: Global Information Technologies of Austin, a company owned by Carmen and Saleem Tawil. The Tawils had previously built and sold a low-power independent TV station in Austin, K13VC.

In August 1997, the FCC approved the combined application of Fredericksburg Channel 2 and Global and dismissed the other applicants, one of which, Frontier Broadcasting, challenged the dismissal in federal appeals court; Frontier had its application dismissed over transmitter site issues in 1989. With a construction permit in hand, the partnership, taking the name of Corridor Television, began building channel 2 in 1998. The call letters KBEJ, a sequential assignment, were given to the construction permit in May 1998.

=== As a UPN affiliate ===
As early as 1997, it appeared most likely that Corridor Television would seek an affiliation with UPN. By 2000, the network had already experienced problems keeping an affiliate in both San Antonio and Austin. When it launched in 1995, the network was affiliated with KRRT (channel 35) in San Antonio, while Austin was served by the Hill Country Paramount Network, a chain of low-power TV stations. Sinclair Broadcast Group, owner of KRRT, switched all of its UPN affiliates to The WB in a group deal announced in 1997, leaving UPN without a full-time affiliate in San Antonio. Since then, UPN had been relegated to late-night clearances on KMOL-TV, the NBC affiliate that was co-owned with UPN itself by United Television. In 1998, UPN had dropped the Hill Country Paramount Network for K13VC on six days' notice because K13VC, unlike the previous affiliate, had cable carriage.

In addition to a UPN affiliation, Corridor contracted with the Belo Corporation, which owned Austin's KVUE and San Antonio's KENS, to operate channel 2 under a local marketing agreement (LMA). KBEJ began broadcasting August 3, 2000. Belo provided management services from KENS and technical services from its headquarters in Dallas. In addition to UPN and syndicated programming, KBEJ boasted a package of 31 San Antonio Spurs games; that year, KENS and KBEJ had won the over-the-air rights to the Spurs from their previous carriers, KSAT and KRRT.

Cable carriage proved to be a difficulty at the outset for KBEJ. Before launch, and even as transmitter tests were being conducted, the FCC had yet to rule on which market the new station, equidistant from San Antonio and Austin, was to be placed in. Originally, channel 2 was placed in the Austin market. However, it would take the new station longer to find cable carriage there than in San Antonio, where it was added by Time Warner Cable on October 28, right before the start of the NBA season. UPN initially designated KBEJ as its San Antonio affiliate, leading Time Warner Cable to deny the station must-carry on its Austin system. It was not until August 2, 2001, that KBEJ made an appearance on Time Warner Cable's Austin system after pressure from viewers and an agreement with Belo.

By the time Austin cable viewers could get KBEJ, however, the Spurs had soured on channel 2. Residents of the south side of San Antonio, further away from Fredericksburg, complained of signal difficulties. The transmitter was located to the north of the city, whereas the market's other stations had their transmitters to its south. The Spurs had averaged an 8.5 rating on KRRT in the 1999–2000 season; by February 2001, they were pulling a 5.5 on KBEJ, whereas ratings for KENS games held steady. Before the 2001–2002 season, the Spurs moved back to KRRT, even though KBEJ had held a multi-year contract for the games.

=== As a CW affiliate ===
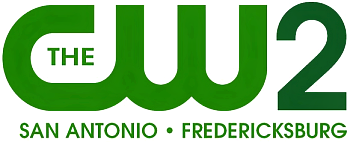
KCWX logo as a CW affiliate, used from September 18, 2006, to the termination of the Belo LMA in April 2010

On January 24, 2006, the Warner Bros. unit of Time Warner and CBS Corporation announced that the two companies would shut down The WB and UPN and combine the networks' respective programming to create a new fifth network, The CW. On March 28, Corridor Television signed an agreement to make KBEJ San Antonio's CW affiliate. Three weeks later, on April 18, The CW announced it had affiliated with Austin's WB affiliate, KNVA. On April 7, 2006, KBEJ changed to KCWX, reflecting its new affiliation.

With The CW boasting affiliates for both San Antonio and Austin, KCWX became a San Antonio-market station exclusively. For a short time thereafter, KCWX remained on Austin cable, with CW programming blacked out to protect KNVA.

Because it was granted an original construction permit after the FCC finalized the DTV allotment plan on April 21, 1997, the station did not receive a companion channel for a digital television station. Instead, the station was required to flash-cut—broadcast exclusively in digital when it left the air in analog. It initially selected channel 8, to which Austin station KTBC objected, and then chose channel 5. This channel was occupied by the analog signal of KENS. In January 2009, the station began operating at reduced power, with one of its two transmitters deactivated, to allow for conversion work at its transmitter site. Corridor planned to turn off the second transmitter on February 10, 2009, with the station being seen on cable only for a week. These plans were disrupted by Congress's decision to postpone the transition by four months. The second transmitter was instead turned off on June 12, 2009. Due to difficulties scheduling installers for tower work, the final digital signal was not ready until July 2009.

=== Switch to MyNetworkTV ===
Sinclair Broadcast Group disclosed in its 2009 annual report for that year, released in March 2010, that it had signed the month before to move the CW affiliation to KMYS—the former KRRT—on September 1, 2010. The affiliation switch was eventually moved up two days to August 30; on that date, the MyNetworkTV affiliation moved to KCWX. With the then-pending loss of its CW affiliation, Belo terminated its LMA with Corridor Television on April 24, 2010, forcing Corridor to operate KCWX on its own from Austin.

On January 22, 2025, the FCC proposed a $369,190 fine against KCWX for failing to properly transmit National Periodic Tests of the Emergency Alert System (EAS) in 2018, 2019 and 2021. According to the report, the FCC accused the station of numerous violations of EAS regulations, including rebroadcasting alert tones and audio relays from previous years, simulating test messages instead of the authorized test message, and falsely claiming to have properly received the tests when it had not. Corridor Television entered into a consent decree with the FCC in August 2026, agreeing to make a $27,000 "voluntary contribution" and implement an EAS compliance plan.

== Sports programming ==
In 2021, KCWX began airing a package of local high school football games in the San Antonio area.

== Technical information ==
=== Subchannels ===
The station's signal is multiplexed:

Subchannels of KCWX
Subchannel	Res.	Short name	Programming
2.1	1080i	KCWX-HD	Main KCWX programming
2.2	480i	KCWX+	Independent
2.3	480i	MainST	Fox Weather
2.4	480i	Catchy	Catchy Comedy
2.5	480i	MeToons	MeTV Toons
35.1	720p	ROAR	Roar (KMYS)

Broadcast on behalf of another station

=== Transmitter facilities ===
KCWX's facilities
City	Channel TV (RF)	ERP	HAAT	Facility ID	Transmitter coordinates
Fredericksburg	2 (8)	34 kW	374.3 m (1,228 ft)	24316	30°8′13.7″N 98°36′36.1″W
Austin	2 (8)	3 kW	166.2 m (545 ft)	24316	30°19′21″N 97°48′4″W
San Antonio	2 (8)	3 kW	117.1 m (384 ft)	24316	29°14′40″N 98°44′28″W
Hondo	2 (8)	1.5 kW	202.4 m (664 ft)	24316	29°36′38.8″N 98°53′34.1″W
Mountain Home	2 (8)	7 kW	165 m (541 ft)	24316	30°15′12.6″N 99°28′1.3″W
Llano	2 (8)	3 kW	103 m (338 ft)	24316	31°4′4″N 98°43′58.9″W
