= News 24 Houston =

Cable news channel

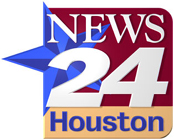
- News 24 Houston logo
- Country: United States
- Broadcast area: Greater Houston

Programming
- Language(s): American English
- Picture format: 480i (SDTV)

Ownership
- Owner: Belo and Time Warner Cable

History
- Launched: December 12, 2002; 22 years ago
- Closed: July 23, 2004; 20 years ago

Links
- Website: News 24 Houston.com

News 24 Houston is a defunct 24-hour cable news television channel featuring a rolling news format, serving the Greater Houston and Galveston areas. It was a joint venture by Belo Corp. (then-owner of local television station KHOU-TV, which assisted the cable channel with newsgathering) and Time Warner Cable (operators of the region's cable television systems at that time). The cable channel started up in December 2002, and was shut down on July 23, 2004, citing low viewership and a lack of advertising revenue. It was shut down along with sister cable station News 9 San Antonio (also a joint venture between Belo and Time Warner). Upon closure, both News 24 and News 9 had instructed viewers to leave their thoughts and comments about the cable channels on sister station News 8 Austin's message boards. This had also affected former sister cable channel News 14 Carolina, which reverted to full Time Warner Control when Belo exited the joint venture, costing 50 jobs at that statewide cable channel's various news bureaus.

== See also ==
- TXCN
- News 9 San Antonio (sister to News 24 Houston)
- KHOU (sister to News 24 Houston)
- KENS (sister to News 9 San Antonio)
- WCNC-TV (former sister to News 14 Carolina)
