= News 9 San Antonio =

- Logo of News 9 San Antonio
- Country: United States
- Broadcast area: San Antonio, Texas

Programming
- Language(s): American English
- Picture format: 480i (SDTV)

Ownership
- Owner: Belo and Time Warner Cable

History
- Launched: April 2003; 21 years ago
- Closed: July 23, 2004; 20 years ago

News 9 San Antonio was a 24-hour cable news featuring a rolling news format, serving the San Antonio, Texas region. It was a joint venture by Belo Corp. (then-owner of local television station KENS-TV, which assisted the cable channel with newsgathering) and Time Warner Cable (operators of the region's cable television systems at the time). The cable channel started up in April 2003, and was shut down on July 23, 2004, citing low viewership and a lack of advertising revenue. It was shut down along with sister cable station News 24 Houston (also a joint venture between Belo and Time Warner). Upon closure, both News 24 and News 9 had instructed viewers to leave their thoughts and comments about the cable channels on sister station News 8 Austin's message boards. This had also affected former sister cable channel News 14 Carolina, which reverted to full Time Warner Control when Belo exited the joint venture, costing 50 jobs at that statewide cable channel's various news bureaus.

On March 11, 2014, Time Warner Cable announced a second attempt to launch a regional news channel for the San Antonio market by launching Time Warner Cable News San Antonio, a subbed of Time Warner Cable News Austin (now Spectrum News Austin after the 2016 merger with Charter). It would operate out of TWCN Austin's headquarters and share managerial staff, with reports being filed for cablecast by San Antonio-based multi-platform reporters in a separate bureau that was established in that city. It was soft-launched on April 8, with a series of weeknight preview broadcasts of two programs airing on the channel (the political discussion program Capital Tonight and the sports highlight program Sports Night). The feed formally launched on June 2, 2014. Plans call for the future hirings of additional journalists based in San Antonio.

== See also ==
- Spectrum News San Antonio, the successor to News 9 San Antonio
- TXCN
- News 24 Houston (sister to News 9 San Antonio)
- KHOU (sister to News 24 Houston)
- KENS (sister to News 9 San Antonio)
- WCNC-TV (former sister to News 14 Carolina)
