= KBVO =

Television station in Llano, Texas

KBVO and KBVO-CD

KBVO: Llano, Texas; KBVO-CD: Austin, Texas; United States
- Channels for KBVO: Digital: 27 (UHF); Virtual: 14
- Channels for KBVO-CD: Digital: 31 (UHF); Virtual: 14
- Branding: KBVO

Programming
- Affiliations: 14.1: Independent with MyNetworkTV; for others, see § Subchannels

Ownership
- Owner: Nexstar Media Group; (Nexstar Media Inc.)
- Sister stations: KXAN-TV, KNVA; Tegna: KVUE

History
- First air date: KBVO: September 6, 1991; KBVO-CD: November 17, 1989
- Former call signs: KBVO: KLNO (September–October 1991); KXAM-TV (1991–2009); KBVO-CD: K49CY (1989–1995); KBVO-LP (1995–2002); KBVO-CA (2002–2009)
- Former channel number: KBVO: Analog: 14 (UHF, 1991–2009); KBVO-CD: Analog: 49 (UHF, 1989–2002), 45 (UHF, 2002–2004), 51 (UHF, 2004–2009); Virtual: 51 (2009–2019), 14 (2019–2020)
- Former affiliations: KBVO: NBC (as semi-satellite of KXAN, 1991–2009); KBVO-CD: NBC (as a KXAN repeater; 1989–1995); UPN (1995–1998); The WB (as a KNVA repeater; 1998–2002); Telefutura (2002–January 2009); The CW (as a KNVA repeater; January–October 2009)
- Call sign meaning: Bevo (name of UT Austin mascot)

Technical information
- Licensing authority: FCC
- Facility ID: KBVO: 35909; KBVO-CD: 35918
- Class: KBVO-CD: CD
- ERP: KBVO: 660 kW; KBVO-CD: 15 kW
- HAAT: KBVO: 249 m (817 ft); KBVO-CD: 339.5 m (1,114 ft)
- Transmitter coordinates: KBVO: 30°40′36″N 98°33′59″W; KBVO-CD: 30°19′34″N 97°47′59″W

Links
- Public license information: KBVO: Public file; LMS; KBVO-CD: Public file; LMS
- Website: www.kxan.com/kbvo

KBVO (channel 14) is a television station licensed to Llano, Texas, United States, serving the Austin area. It is primarily programmed as an independent station, but maintains a secondary affiliation with MyNetworkTV. KBVO is owned by Nexstar Media Group alongside NBC affiliate KXAN-TV (channel 36) and is co-managed with CW station KNVA (channel 54); Nexstar's Tegna subsidiary owns ABC affiliate KVUE (channel 24). KBVO, KXAN-TV, and KNVA share studios on West Martin Luther King Jr. Boulevard and San Gabriel Street (between the Old West Austin section of Austin and the University of Texas at Austin campus); KBVO's transmitter is located near the intersection of TX 71 and Llano County Road 307 in unincorporated Llano County (8 miles (13 km) southeast of Llano).

KBVO-CD (channel 31) in Austin operates as a low-power, Class A ATSC 3.0 lighthouse of KXAN-TV, KNVA, and KEYE-TV; this station's transmitter is located at the West Austin Antenna Farm on Mount Larson (near Loop 360 and Westlake Drive, north of West Lake Hills).

== History ==
=== As a semi-satellite of KXAN ===
On November 5, 1985, the Llano Broadcasting Co. (owned by Round Mountain–based judge A.W. Mousund and his wife, Mary Mousund, who later renamed the licensee Horseshoe Bay Centex Broadcasting Co.) filed an application with the Federal Communications Commission (FCC) for a license and construction permit to operate a commercial television station on UHF channel 14. On July 10, 1986, the Mousunds received approval to assign KLNO (in reference to its city of license, Llano) for use as the television station's call letters.

Although KXAN-TV (then known as KTVV) increased its transmitting power in 1973, the station found it difficult to adequately compete against CBS affiliate KTBC-TV (channel 7, now a Fox owned-and-operated station), ABC affiliate KVUE (channel 24) and, later, [the original] KBVO-TV (channel 42, now CBS affiliate KEYE-TV) largely because of the difficulties that UHF television stations experienced with signal propagation in areas of rugged terrain. The station's analog signal on UHF channel 36 provided an inadequate over-the-air signal to the western part of the Hill Country and was marginal to basically unviewable in Llano, Fredericksburg, Blanco and surrounding areas, with some parts of the region only being able to receive a clear signal from channel 36 once cable television became established in the Austin market in the late 1970s.

To solve this coverage gap problem, in 1989, KXAN rolled out plans to launch a network of UHF repeater stations to serve areas that had fair to no reception of its main signal, which was to have included five low-power television stations serving Llano, Blanco, San Marcos and Burnet as well as a fill-in translator in Austin. On May 9, 1989, LIN Broadcasting—through an indirect subsidiary, Kingstip Communications Inc., which LIN acquired as part of its 1979 purchase of channel 36—filed an application to acquire the dormant KLNO license from Horseshoe Bay Centex Broadcasting Co. (which was unable to complete construction of the KLNO transmitter) for $100,000; LIN intended to launch KLNO as a semi-satellite of KXAN to reach viewers in the western Hill Country who could not adequately receive the channel 36 signal. On December 6, 1990, the FCC granted LIN/Kingstip's application to acquire the construction permit for KLNO, conditioned upon the payment to Horseshoe Centex Broadcasting not exceeding $100,000.

Channel 14 first signed on the air as a KXAN semi-satellite on September 6, 1991; it was the first (and only) full-power television station ever built and signed-on by the LIN TV Corporation (which operated at the time as the television broadcasting unit of original parent LIN Broadcasting). While the station was intended to improve KXAN's over-the-air reception in eleven Central Texas counties (especially in Llano, Burnet, Blanco, Gillespie, Mason, San Saba and Lampasas counties), some viewers in this part of the Hill Country initially complained that the KLNO signal created interference issues (including, among others, signal shadowing and double-imaging) with other Austin-area television stations. In an Austin American-Statesman report on these issues published three weeks after KLNO's sign-on, KXAN chief engineer Dave Daniel cited that signal amplifiers installed onto the home antennas of many Hill Country residents to enhance reception of other Austin-area stations had the side effect of strengthening the Channel 14 signal to levels that interfered with those stations; to remedy this problem, the KXAN engineering staff developed amplifier filters to be distributed to affected area residents.

KXAM-TV logo used from 1991 to 2007; it was based on the logo used at the time by KXAN-TV.

After only one month on the air, to match its parent station, LIN changed the Llano station's call letters to KXAM-TV on October 14, 1991. (For ratings purposes, Nielsen identified the two stations collectively as "KXAN+" in its local ratings tabulation diaries.) The station simulcast KXAN-TV's programming for most of the broadcast day, with the exception of breakaways for local news inserts produced from a bureau facility in Llano (which was equipped with a microwave truck and a live microwave link to a relay tower in Round Mountain) that were placed into channel 36's newscasts. KLNO/KXAM's existence was primarily acknowledged only in KXAN's legal station identifications, with a variant of channel 36's logo being used for disambiguation purposes in channel 14's own station IDs and periodically during KXAN's newscasts until February 2007. Along with other improvements to the station's news operations, the expanded signal coverage provided by Channel 14 helped boost KXAN's profile in the market, helping it vie for first place with KVUE (as KTBC's own news viewership declined following that station's July 1995 switch to Fox) in the late 1990s.

On January 14, 2002, KBVO-CA converted into a Spanish language station, when it became a charter affiliate of TeleFutura (now UniMás); in January 2009, that station converted into a full-time simulcast of primary CW/secondary MyNetworkTV-affiliated sister station KNVA (channel 54), after Univision Communications acquired the local affiliation rights to TeleFutura and migrated its programming to Class-A low-power station KTFO-CA (channel 31), which the company had previously operated as a repeater of Univision owned-and-operated station KAKW-TV (channel 62).

=== As a separate entertainment-based station; MyNetworkTV affiliation ===
On August 3, 2009, Channel 14's call letters were changed to KBVO, named after the University of Texas at Austin's mascot, "Bevo". (Prior to being reassigned for use by Channel 14 repeater station KBVO-CA in 1995, the callsign had originally been used on UHF channel 42 from its December 1983 sign-on as an independent station until it became a CBS affiliate, accordingly adopting the KEYE-TV call letters, in July 1995.) Subsequently, on October 21, KBVO took over as the Austin-area affiliate of MyNetworkTV, assuming the programming rights from KNVA, which had carried it on a tape delayed basis since the network-turned-programming service launched in September 2006 (initially airing from 9 to 11 p.m. after CW prime time programming, before temporarily being shifted one hour later after KNVA debuted a KXAN-produced 9 p.m. newscast on September 21, 2009). Until fellow charter MyNetworkTV affiliate WKTC in Columbia, South Carolina, added a primary affiliation with The CW in August 2014, KNVA was one of two American television stations (not counting a handful of others that carry both networks on separate subchannels) that carried programming from both The CW and MyNetworkTV. (The other, KWKB in Iowa City, Iowa, continued to carry the full schedules of both netlets/programming services for another two years until it also chose to disaffiliate from MyNetworkTV and become an exclusive CW affiliate in 2016.)

KBVO—which originally branded as "MyAustinTV" under the service's branding conventions, before identifying solely by its call letters in 2012—also adopted a separate program schedule (consisting mainly of first-run syndicated talk and court shows, recent off-network sitcoms and drama series), with a partial emphasis on professional, high school and college sports events. LIN and KXAN management cited the conversion into a separate station as an effort to provide unique program offerings to differentiate KBVO amid a decrease in the number of Hill Country households that received KXAN over-the-air since Channel 14 signed on (declining from 60% in 1991 to less than 15% in 2009). Rather than offering a market-wide simulcast feed on a subchannel of either KXAN or KNVA, the full-power KBVO converted low-power station KBVO-CA into a translator to extend its reach into metropolitan Austin; however, its 75-watt signal barely covered Austin proper and did not cover surrounding towns such as San Marcos and Georgetown. As such, most viewers living in Austin and surrounding areas originally had to rely on cable or satellite to receive the station (in Austin, subscribers of Time Warner Cable [which ceded its local cable franchise rights to Charter Communications as a result of Time Warner Cable's 2016 merger with Charter] could only receive KBVO via its high-definition channel tier until July 2011, when it began carrying a standard definition feed of the station on channel 7).

On March 21, 2014, Richmond, Virginia-based Media General announced that it would purchase the LIN Media stations, including KXAN-TV, KBVO, and the LMA with KNVA, in a $1.6 billion merger. Despite the fact that KBVO no longer acted as a simulcast of KXAN, Media General filed to renew an existing satellite relay waiver to allow KBVO to continue under the same ownership as KXAN to comply with FCC rules in effect at the time that prohibited legal duopolies in media markets where there were fewer than eight independent owners of full-power television stations. The FCC approved the merger on December 12, 2014, with the deal being consummated on December 19.

On March 9, 2015, the KBVO-CD translator—which concurrently moved from UHF channel 51 to UHF 31—increased its effective radiated power (ERP) to the maximum 15 kW, which allowed it to cover the entirety of the Austin metropolitan area. Furthermore, on September 23, 2016, the main KBVO signal increased its ERP from 75 watts to 15,000 watts, which expanded the station's signal contour to a 54.7-mile (88.0 km) radius that includes San Marcos and Georgetown, among other Central Texas cities.

On January 27, 2016, after terminating the planned $2.4-billion acquisition of the Des Moines, Iowa–based Meredith Corporation it announced the previous September, Media General announced it had signed an agreement to sell its assets to the Irving-based Nexstar Broadcasting Group—which had a previous $14.50-per-share offer for the group be rejected by Media General two months earlier—for an evaluation of $4.6 billion in cash and stock plus the assumption of $2.3 billion in Media General-held debt. The transaction was approved by the FCC on January 11, 2017; the sale was completed six days later on January 17, at which point the existing Nexstar stations and the former Media General outlets that were not subject to divestiture to address ownership conflicts in certain overlapping markets became part of the renamed Nexstar Media Group. The deal marked Nexstar's re-entry into the Austin market, as the group had previously operated KEYE-TV under a local marketing agreement with Four Points Media Group from 2009 to 2011, concluding after Sinclair Broadcast Group acquired KEYE and the other Four Points stations; it also resulted in KBVO becoming the fourth Nexstar station to have originated as a part- or full-time satellite station prior to converting into an independently programmed outlet (along with NBC affiliate KNWA-TV in Fort Smith, Arkansas, and MyNetworkTV affiliates WCIX in Champaign, Illinois, and KYLE-TV in Bryan).

On August 19, 2025, Nexstar announced it would acquire Tegna—owner of KVUE—for $6.2 billion. The deal was completed on March 19, 2026, and included approval for Nexstar to own three station licenses in markets such as Austin.

== Programming ==
KBVO carries the entire nighttime-exclusive MyNetworkTV programming schedule; however, the station may timeshift the MyNetworkTV schedule to late evening and/or overnight timeslots to accommodate local or regional sporting events and fulfill advertising commitments for commercials sold for carriage during local ad breaks within the service's prime time lineup. In addition, KBVO may take on the responsibility of running NBC network programs in the event that sister station KXAN-TV is unable to carry them because of extended breaking news or severe weather coverage.

KBVO also serves as an alternate local carrier of the Xploration Station educational program block, offering certain programs preempted by Fox owned-and-operated station KTBC due to Fox Sports programming commitments on Sunday mornings in lieu of those programs being tape-delayed to air in an open timeslot within that station's weekend daytime schedule. From the station's conversion into a MyNetworkTV affiliate in 2009 until September 2014, KBVO aired a night-behind rebroadcast of sister station KXAN's 10 p.m. newscast on Tuesday through Saturday mornings.

=== Sports programming ===
Since adopting a standalone programming schedule in October 2009, channel 14 has carried various local and syndicated sporting events.

==== High school and college sports ====
The station began carrying high school football "games-of-the-week" involving teams from Central Texas high schools on Thursday nights in the fall of 2009, which are selected based on the most competitive matchups scheduled to take each week during the season; KBVO aired 11 high school football games during the 2009 and 2010 seasons, increasing to 22 matchups (with eleven aired live on Thursday nights and eleven additional Friday games held that aired on a day-behind tape delay on Saturdays) beginning in 2011. The game schedule was relegated to encompass only the live Thursday games beginning with the 2015 fall academic sports season. (The website of parent station KXAN also provides live streams of the Thursday evening games and previously carried delayed streams of the Friday games each Saturday.)

Since October 2009, KBVO has served as the official television partner of the Texas Longhorns, holding rights to air various team-related programs during the regular season (including the weekly analysis program Longhorn Sports Center Weekly and postseason team reviews) as well as some men's and women's basketball, baseball and softball games that are not televised nationally on broadcast or cable television. (Outside of those carried by KBVO via the University of Texas' in-house syndication network, most Longhorns sporting events are carried locally by FanDuel Sports Network Southwest.) From 2009 to 2014, channel 14 also aired college basketball games from the Big 12 Conference (of which the University of Texas is a member) that were syndicated by ESPN Plus; KBVO aired between 10 and 12 regular season games each year as well as games from the first three rounds of the Big 12 men's basketball tournament. Most college basketball telecasts aired on the station on Saturday afternoons, although it also occasionally carried prime time games on weeknights, specifically during the Big 12 men's tournament. In addition, the station carries college football and basketball games from the Southland Conference.

In 2009, KBVO assumed the local rights to the Southeastern Conference (SEC) syndication package distributed by the ESPN Plus-managed SEC TV service, carrying regular season college football and basketball games as well as the first three rounds of the SEC men's basketball tournament; these broadcasts continued to air until 2014, when the conference made its sports events pay TV-exclusive to the SEC Network venture between the SEC and ESPN.) The station also carried select college football and basketball games involving the Texas State Bobcats beginning with the 2009–10 academic season.

==== Professional and semi-professional sports ====
Since the 2009–10 season, KBVO has served as the local over-the-air television carrier of NBA games involving the San Antonio Spurs (via Fox Sports Southwest). Since the team's incorporation in 2010, the station has also carried American Hockey League (AHL) games involving the Cedar Park-based Texas Stars. Since 2010, KBVO has also held the local broadcast rights to NFL preseason games from the Houston Texans distributed by the team's regional syndication service; the station, which assumed the preseason telecast rights to the Texans from KNVA, carries roughly between three and five prime time game telecasts annually.

Since 2010, the station has held the local syndication rights to broadcast Major League Baseball (MLB) games involving the Texas Rangers (which were distributed by the team's in-house regional syndication service). In 2011, KBVO obtained partial television rights to Minor League Baseball games involving the Round Rock Express, carrying the Pacific Coast League team's Saturday home games as part of a package it shared with local cable news channel YNN Austin (now Spectrum News 1 Austin), which held rights to the Express's Friday home games as well as a weekly team analysis program. (Longtime KXAN sports director Roger Wallace handled play-by-play duties for the Express's KBVO game telecasts, alongside former MLB pitchers Kelly Wunsch and Kirk Dressendorfer as color commentators.)

Beginning in 2019, KBVO began carrying Austin Bold FC matches played at home.

Beginning in 2021, KBVO became the over-the-air home of the Austin Gilgronis of Major League Rugby. Also that year, KBVO began carrying select Austin FC matches.

== Technical information ==
=== Subchannels ===
The station's signal is multiplexed:

Subchannels of KBVO
Subchannel	Res.	Short name	Programming
14.1	1080i	KBVO	Main KBVO programming
14.2	480i	Bounce	Bounce TV
14.3	480i	Antenna	Antenna TV
14.4	480i	Defy	Ion Plus

=== Analog-to-digital conversion ===
KBVO shut down its analog signal on June 12, 2009, as part of the FCC-mandated transition to digital television for full-power stations. The station's digital signal remained on its pre-transition UHF channel 27, using virtual channel 14.

=== KBVO-CD ATSC 3.0 lighthouse ===
KBVO-CD (RF channel 31) transitioned to ATSC 3.0 on October 7, 2020, and is simulcasting KXAN, KEYE and KNVA programming. The main KBVO station continues with its existing ATSC 1.0 programming. The previous ATSC 1.0 programming moved to KXAN (RF channel 21), KEYE (RF channel 34) and KNVA (RF channel 23), but maintains the same virtual channels as follows:

Previous RF channel	Current RF channel	Virtual channel (no change)	ATSC 1.0 programming	ATSC 1.0 host
31.3	23.2	14.1	Main KBVO programming	KNVA
31.4	34.3	14.2	Bounce TV	KEYE-TV
31.5	34.4	14.3	Antenna TV	KEYE-TV
31.6	21.5	14.4	Ion Plus	KXAN-TV

The following ATSC 3.0 subchannels broadcast on RF channel 31:

Subchannel	Short name	Programming
14.1	KBVO	Main KBVO programming
36.1	KXAN	NBC (KXAN-TV)
42.1	KEYE	CBS (KEYE-TV)
54.1	KNVA	The CW (KNVA)

Subchannel broadcast with digital rights management
