= KBEJ =

KBEJ may refer to:

- KBEJ-LP, a low-power radio station (104.1 FM) licensed to serve Beaumont, Texas, United States
- KCWX, a television station (channel 5/virtual 2) licensed to serve Fredericksburg, Texas, which held the call sign KBEJ from 2000 to 2006
