= KXAN-TV =

Television station in Austin, Texas

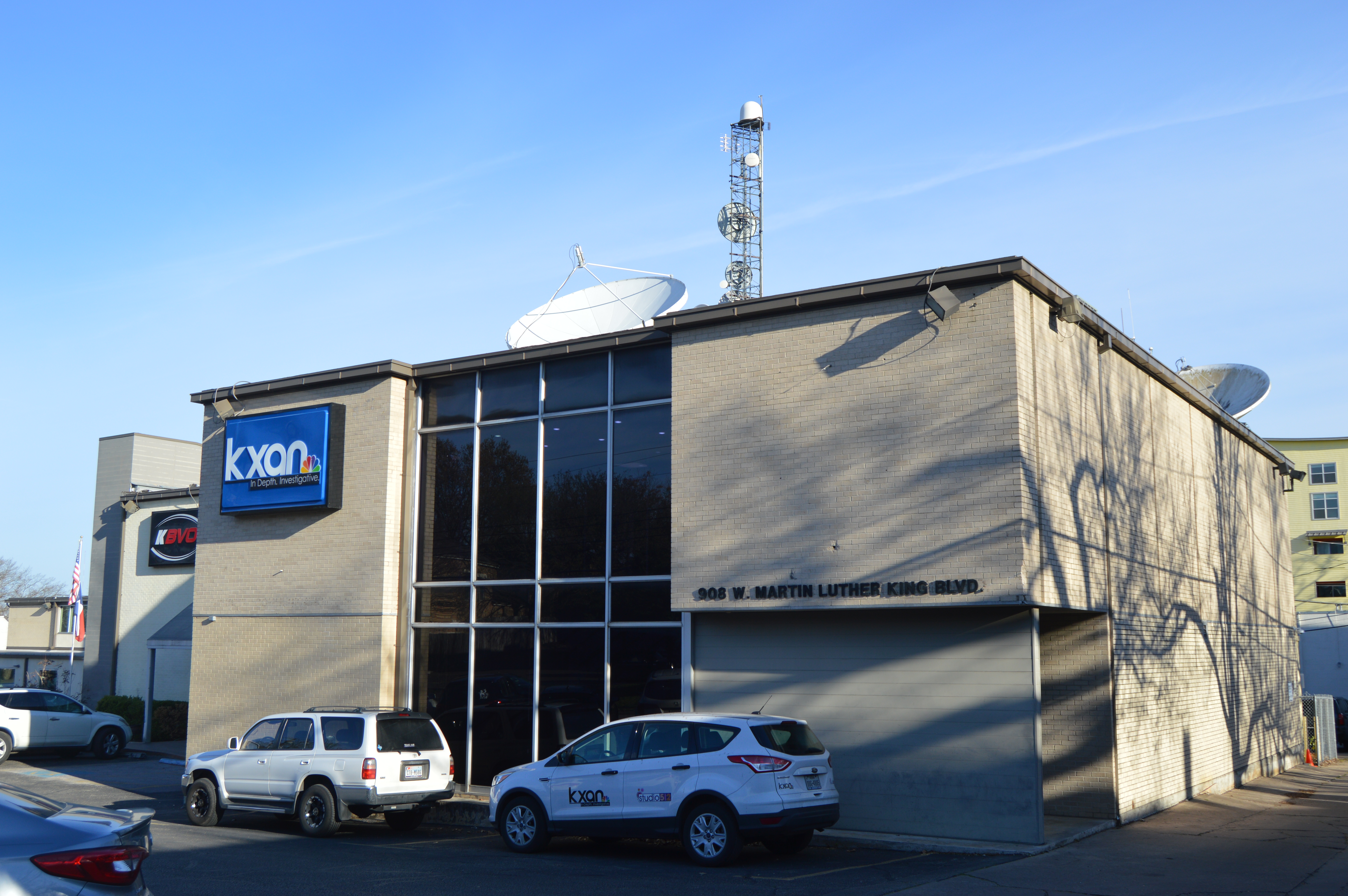
- Offices near the University of Texas campus
- Austin, Texas; United States
- Channels: Digital: 21 (UHF); Virtual: 36
- Branding: KXAN

Programming
- Affiliations: 36.1: NBC; for others, see § Subchannels

Ownership
- Owner: Nexstar Media Group; (Nexstar Media Inc.)
- Sister stations: KBVO/KBVO-CD, KNVA; Tegna: KVUE

History
- First air date: February 12, 1965
- Former call signs: KTXN (CP, 1962–1964); KHFI-TV (1964–1973); KTVV (1973–1987)
- Former channel number: Analog: 42 (UHF, 1965–1973), 36 (UHF, 1973–2009)
- Former affiliations: Independent (1965–1966)
- Call sign meaning: Texan; also, variant of former sister station KXAS in Dallas–Fort Worth

Technical information
- Licensing authority: FCC
- Facility ID: 35920
- ERP: 700 kW
- HAAT: 395.4 m (1,297 ft)
- Transmitter coordinates: 30°19′34″N 97°47′59″W

Links
- Public license information: Public file; LMS
- Website: kxan.com

KXAN-TV (channel 36) is a television station in Austin, Texas, United States, affiliated with NBC. It is owned by Nexstar Media Group alongside KBVO (channel 14), an independent station with MyNetworkTV, and operated with CW station KNVA (channel 54); Nexstar's Tegna subsidiary owns ABC affiliate KVUE (channel 24). KXAN-TV, KBVO and KNVA share studios on West Martin Luther King Jr. Boulevard in the Old West Austin section, just west of the University of Texas at Austin campus and just north of downtown; the studios and offices consist of a setup which includes the main studio and newsroom, and an unconnected auxiliary office building across the street. KXAN-TV's transmitter is located at the West Austin Antenna Farm north of West Lake Hills.

== History ==
The station first signed on the air on February 12, 1965, as KHFI-TV, broadcasting on UHF channel 42. It was owned by the Kingsbury family, along with KHFI radio (970 AM, now KJFK at 1490; and 98.3 FM, now KVET-FM at 98.1). KHFI was the second television station in Austin, signing on a little more than twelve years after KTBC-TV (channel 7). Although Austin was big enough to support three television stations as early as the 1950s, KTBC was the only VHF license in the area. Until 1964, UHF stations could only be seen with an expensive converter, and even then picture quality left much to be desired. Additionally, UHF signals usually do not travel very far over long distances or over rugged terrain. This made several potential owners skittish about the prospects for UHF in a market that stretched from Mason in the west to La Grange in the east, and also included much of the Hill Country.

KHFI-TV logically should have signed on as Austin's NBC station, since up to that time all three networks had been shoehorned on KTBC, then a primary CBS affiliate. However, due to contractual obligations, it spent more than a year-and-a-half as an independent station before joining NBC in 1966. Unlike most affiliates with the network in then two-station markets, KHFI did not take on a secondary ABC affiliation (KTBC instead took on the secondary ABC affiliation, until a third station, KVUE [channel 24], signed on in 1971, taking on the ABC affiliation). The Kingsburys would later bring in Henry Tippie as a partner and on January 15, 1973, were granted permission from the Federal Communications Commission (FCC) to move KHFI-TV to channel 36.

KTVV's logo in June 1974.

With the channel change came a new set of call letters, KTVV. The station also boosted its transmitter power to five million watts, which more than doubled its coverage area, and for a time billed itself as the most powerful TV station in the Southwest with these changes. What was then known as LIN Broadcasting purchased the station in 1979. The call letters were changed to the current KXAN-TV on October 15, 1987, in reference to then-sister station and fellow NBC affiliate (now owned-and-operated station) KXAS-TV in Fort Worth. Even with the increased power, channel 36's signal was marginal in some parts of the Hill Country such as Fredericksburg. On September 6, 1991, LIN signed on KLNO in Llano to improve KXAN's reach in the Hill Country. It changed that station's call letters to KXAM-TV after about a month on the air and later to the current KBVO on August 3, 2009. This call sign, named after the University of Texas' mascot "Bevo", was formerly used on the current channel 42—which is now CBS affiliate KEYE-TV—from December 1983 to July 1995, and is shared with channel 14's repeater KBVO-CD.

KXAN's logo used from 2002 until 2007. The "falling 36" seen here had been used since 1987 when it adopted its present call letters.

KXAN is one of two stations in Austin (the other being KVUE) to retain its original network affiliation in the wake of a network swap between KTBC and Fox station KBVO (now KEYE-TV, channel 42) in 1995, the result of Fox's affiliation deal with New World Communications due to that network acquiring rights to NFL games. On October 21, 2009, KBVO became a separate station after picking up the MyNetworkTV affiliation from KNVA. That station carried the network as a secondary affiliation (airing on KNVA on Monday through Saturday nights from 9 to 11 p.m.), known on-air as "MyNetworkTV on The CW Austin", from its launch on September 5, 2006. In mid-September 2009, that station moved MyNetworkTV programs an hour later from 10 p.m. to midnight to make room for a nightly 9 p.m. newscast to compete with KTBC's established prime time newscast. To date, KNVA was one of two stations in the United States to carry The CW and MyNetworkTV (the other being KWKB in Iowa City, Iowa, which until 2011 was the only station that carried the full schedules of both netlets/programming services).

KXAN's current tower was activated in 1996, replacing an older structure that had been built in 1964. Of the fifteen towers on the hill, the channel 36 tower is the tallest and the highest structure in Austin. In addition to its transmission antenna, the mast also incorporates a camera with views of downtown to the east and the hills to the west.

On March 21, 2014, it was announced that Media General would acquire LIN. The merger was completed on December 19, 2014, and KXAN joined the Media General station portfolio. Just over a year after that deal was completed, on January 27, 2016, Media General announced that it had entered into a definitive agreement to be acquired by Nexstar Broadcasting Group (which is based in Irving and already owned many other stations in Texas), in a deal valued at $17.14 per-share, valuing the company at $4.6 billion plus the assumption of $2.3 billion debt. The combined company would be known as Nexstar Media Group, and own 171 stations (including KXAN-TV), serving an estimated 39% of households. The merger also marked a re-entry into Austin for Nexstar, which had managed CBS affiliate KEYE-TV under a groupwide agreement with the Four Points Media Group before that company's stations were sold to Sinclair at the beginning of 2012. The deal was finalized on January 17, 2017.

On August 19, 2025, Nexstar announced it would acquire Tegna—owner of KVUE—for $6.2 billion. The deal was completed on March 19, 2026, and included approval for Nexstar to own three station licenses in markets such as Austin. A temporary restraining order issued one week later by the U.S. District Court for the Eastern District of California, later escalated to a preliminary injunction, has prevented KVUE from being integrated into KXAN, KBVO and KNVA.

== News operation ==
KXAN-TV presently broadcasts 42 hours, 25 minutes of locally produced newscasts each week (with 7 hours, 5 minutes each weekday; three hours on Saturdays and four hours on Sundays).

For most of its first 30 years on the air, KHFI/KTVV/KXAN was a distant runner-up to KTBC. Despite efforts to produce a newscast of major market quality (early newscasts deliberately copied the look of NBC's flagship owned-and-operated station WNBC in New York City), it was usually unable to make a dent in KTBC's ratings dominance. Another setback was as a UHF station, KTVV/KXAN had a hard time maintaining a local share as an NBC affiliate due to the presence of nearby NBC stations in the San Antonio and Temple/Waco markets. KXAN's first number one rated newscast was also Austin's first hour-long morning newscast, News 36 Firstcast, which went on the air in November 1990. All other local stations soon followed suit, but Firstcast built an audience that delivered KXAN the station's first sweeps victory in February 1993. After KTBC switched to its current Fox affiliation in 1995, KXAN's ratings slowly increased in other time periods. By the latter part of the 1990s, channel 36 had overtaken channel 7 for the lead. Since then, it has waged a spirited battle for first place in the market with KVUE.

On December 23, 2008, starting with the weekday noon newscast, KXAN became the third television station in the Austin market (and the second LIN owned station, behind WAVY-TV/WVBT in the Hampton Roads market) to begin broadcasting its local newscasts in high definition. On September 28, 2009, the station began producing a nightly 9 p.m. newscast on KNVA (currently titled KXAN News at 9) to compete with KTBC's longer-established and hour-long prime time newscast.

On September 3, 2013, KXAN began producing a two-hour extension of its weekday morning newscast for sister station KNVA. Known as KXAN News on The CW Austin, the expanded broadcast runs from 7 to 9 a.m. and competes against KTBC's long-dominant morning newscast Good Day Austin and the national morning programs on the market's other major network affiliates.

== Technical information ==
KXAN's transmission tower.

=== Subchannels ===
The station's signal is multiplexed:

Subchannels of KXAN-TV
Subchannel	Res.	Short name	Programming
36.1	1080i	KXAN-DT	NBC
36.2	480i	COZI	Cozi TV
36.3	480i	ION	Ion
36.4	480i	Rewind	Rewind TV
14.4	480i	Defy	Ion Plus (KBVO-CD)

Broadcast on behalf of another station

=== Analog-to-digital conversion ===
KXAN-TV shut down its analog signal on June 12, 2009, as part of the FCC-mandated transition to digital television for full-power stations. The station's digital signal remained on its pre-transition UHF channel 21, using virtual channel 36.

== Carriage disputes ==
=== Suddenlink Communications ===
KXAN and LIN TV were locked into a contract dispute with Suddenlink Communications, which serves portions of the Austin market, such as Pflugerville and Georgetown. The dispute centered around KXAN's failure to grant retransmission consent to Suddenlink. The station was removed from Suddenlink after the previous contract expired on December 31, 2007. KXAN claimed that it was seeking "fair value" for its programming. However, a press release from Suddenlink management indicated that the dispute included consideration for other stations owned by LIN TV outside of Texas.

On January 3, 2008, Suddenlink began transmitting the signal of Temple-based NBC affiliate KCEN-TV to restore the network's programming to the affected areas. This is allowed under FCC rules because KCEN is a "significantly viewed" station in Williamson County even though that county is located in the Austin market. On March 24, Suddenlink and KXAN's dispute was settled and the station was restored to Suddenlink's systems the following day. The terms of the settlement were not announced though it is widely believed that KXAN had lost thousands of viewers. Despite its cable carriage problems, the station surprised many observers by placing first in the 5–7 a.m. weekday time slot during the May 2008 sweeps period.

=== Time Warner Cable ===
KXAN and LIN TV were locked in another contract dispute with Time Warner Cable, which serves a very large majority of the Austin metropolitan area. LIN dropped its stations from Time Warner Cable systems nationwide at Midnight CDT on October 3, 2008. Over-the-air stations such as KXAN have long allowed cable companies to carry their signals for free. Cable networks are paid as much as ten cents per day per subscriber for their content and LIN TV wanted Time Warner to pay them less than one cent per subscriber per day. KXAN general manager Eric Lassberg stated that the cable company "does not have to pass that cost along to the viewers unless they want to". On October 3, Time Warner replaced KXAN with a continuous loop of instructions on how to hook up a television to a computer on Time Warner Cable. Some days later this was replaced by the premium channel Starz Kids and Family. KXAN returned to the Time Warner lineup during the early morning hours of October 29, 2008. No details were released on the deal though some have speculated that KXAN could not afford to be without over 67% of their previous viewers during the critical November ratings period.
