= Walt Maciborski =

Walt Maciborski is a television news anchor. He currently anchors the weekday 5 p.m., 6 p.m., and 10 p.m. newscasts at KEYE-TV in Austin, Texas. Previously, Walt worked as an anchor at WXIN-TV, FOX 59 in Indianapolis. Before that, Walt worked as WFTS-TV beginning in October 2005. Walt also was an assistant producer at ABC News in Los Angeles, London, and Washington D.C. He also worked at many local news stations in Medford, Oregon, Austin, Texas, and Atlanta, Georgia (WXIA). Walt (whose last name is pronounced MAC-eh-bor-skee) also goes by Woot Mac.
