= KNVA =

Television station in Austin, Texas

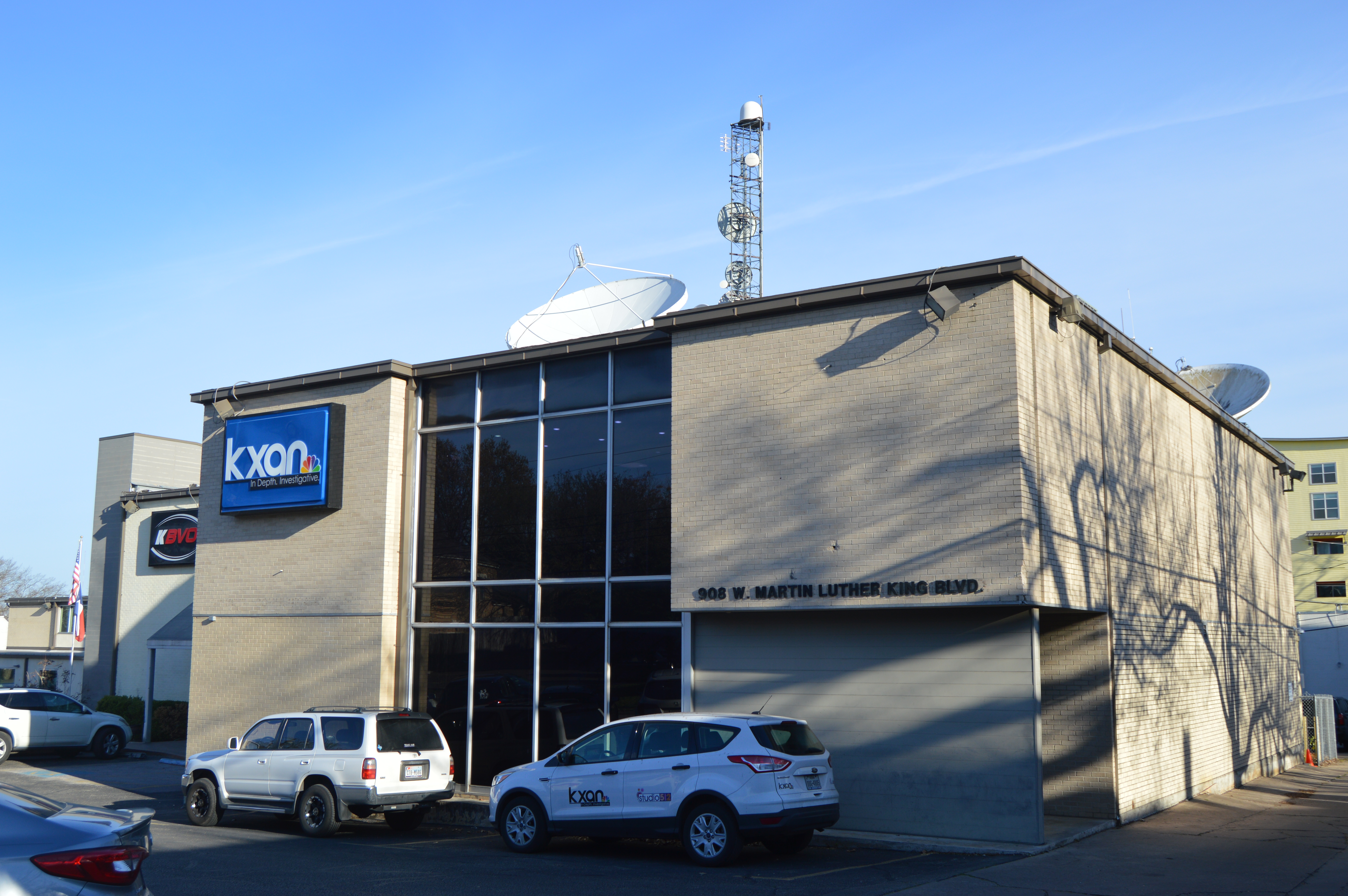
- KNVA has operated from KXAN-TV's studios for its entire existence
- Austin, Texas; United States
- Channels: Digital: 23 (UHF); Virtual: 54
- Branding: CW Austin

Programming
- Affiliations: 54.1: The CW; for others, see § Subchannels

Ownership
- Owner: Vaughan Media; (54 Broadcasting, Inc.)
- Operator: Nexstar Media Group
- Sister stations: KXAN-TV; KBVO / KBVO-CD; Tegna: KVUE

History
- First air date: August 31, 1994
- Former call signs: KCFP (CP, 1989–1994)
- Former channel numbers: Analog: 54 (UHF, 1994–2009); Digital: 49 (UHF, until 2019)
- Former affiliations: Local weather (1994–1995); The WB (1995–2006); MyNetworkTV (secondary, 2006–2009)
- Call sign meaning: "Nueva"

Technical information
- Licensing authority: FCC
- Facility ID: 144
- ERP: 500 kW
- HAAT: 390.7 m (1,282 ft)
- Transmitter coordinates: 30°19′34″N 97°47′59″W
- Translator(s): see § Repeaters

Links
- Public license information: Public file; LMS
- Website: www.kxan.com/the-cw-austin

KNVA (channel 54) is a television station in Austin, Texas, United States, affiliated with The CW. It is owned by Vaughan Media and operated by Nexstar Media Group, owner of KXAN-TV (channel 36), an NBC affiliate, and KBVO (channel 14), an independent station with MyNetworkTV; Nexstar's Tegna subsidiary owns ABC affiliate KVUE (channel 24). KNVA, KXAN-TV, and KBVO share studios on West Martin Luther King Jr. Boulevard in Austin. KNVA's transmitter is on Buckman Mountain Road north of West Lake Hills.

Channel 54 has been managed by KXAN-TV throughout its history. The construction permit was obtained in 1988 by a consortium including former KVUE anchor Ron Oliveira, which added other investors before the station began broadcasting on August 31, 1994. After airing a loop of local weather information for its first four months on the air, KNVA became a general-entertainment station and affiliate of The WB in January 1995. Oliveira anchored a KXAN-produced 5:30 p.m. newscast on the station between 1995 and 1997. He continued to own a stake in the license until 2009, when his shares were acquired by Vaughan.

KNVA became Austin's affiliate of The CW at the network's launch in 2006, also airing MyNetworkTV programs between 2006 and 2009. KXAN reintroduced local news to channel 54 in 2009 with a 9 p.m. newscast, since complemented by an extended morning newscast.

== History ==
=== Construction and early years ===
On a petition from the Allandale Baptist Church of Texas, the Federal Communications Commission (FCC) allocated channel 54 to Austin on January 27, 1984. A group owned by the church, Capital City Community Interests Inc., applied for the channel on May 22. It proposed a family-oriented program lineup using fare from the American Christian Television System. Its application led to a stampede, and by the time the FCC had designated all of the applications for comparative hearing, there were nine different groups seeking the channel. These included ATV Associates, Balcones Broadcasting (majority-owned by Houston attorney Billy B. "Paz" Goldberg and chaired by local news anchor Ronnell H. "Ron" Oliveira), Capital City Community Interests, Capitol Area Broadcasting, Channel 54, Ltd., DB Broadcasting, Isabel Chávez, Lake Country Telecasters Inc., and Television 54 Corp. Lake Country dropped out of the proceeding on September 3, 1985.

FCC administrative law judge Joseph Chachkin rendered an initial decision favoring Balcones on July 10, 1986. The grant was conditional on Goldberg divesting his interests in KVEO-TV in Brownsville—where Oliveira had become an assistant general manager in early 1985 and which Goldberg was in the process of acquiring at the time Balcones filed its application—and KPEJ in Odessa. In the meantime, Oliveira returned to KVUE (channel 24) in 1987. The original decision was affirmed on October 30, 1987, when the FCC approved a settlement agreement between the seven applicants and granted Balcones's amended application for UHF channel 54. The FCC upheld the grant in May 1988, after Frontier Southwest Broadcasting—which had held a construction permit to build a low-power TV station on channel 55—objected. An economic downturn stalled progress on constructing channel 54. The permit, then known as KCFP, was transferred from Balcones Broadcasting to 54 Broadcasting in an application filed in 1990 and approved in 1992, bringing in several new investors including the Houston-based 21st Century Corporation.

In 1994, 54 Broadcasting entered into a local marketing agreement with LIN TV Corporation—owner of NBC affiliate KXAN-TV (channel 36)—to provide sales and technical support to channel 54, now bearing the call sign KNVA. In July, Oliveira announced his departure from KVUE, effective in September, to manage the new station. To meet an FCC-imposed construction deadline, KNVA made its first test broadcast on August 31, 1994, before adopting a program format consisting of weather information from KXAN meteorologists.

=== As a WB affiliate ===
The weather programming was never intended to be a full-time format. 54 Broadcasting stated its intention to bid for an affiliation with CBS, which had become available amid a major affiliation realignment in the Austin market, but was seen as well behind the established KBVO (channel 42) in what it could offer to the network. In November 1994, it signed an affiliation agreement with the startup WB network, to debut in January 1995, and announced that it would have a full-time entertainment schedule and a cable channel position on January 9. Outside of WB programming, KNVA featured family-oriented classic TV series, children's programs, movies, a limited amount of Spanish-language programming, and reruns of KXAN newscasts. The weather information, which had proven unexpectedly popular, aired in overnight hours.

A live newscast joined the KNVA lineup on October 16, 1995, with the debut of the 5:30 Report, produced by KXAN from a dedicated news set with Oliveira as co-anchor and using KXAN's reporting, weather, and sports staffs. At the time, Oliveira also anchored the 6 p.m. news on KXAN. The newscast never found an audience in a crowded Austin news marketplace and was canceled in June 1997; Oliveira remained an on-air presence until 1999, when he became minority owner chief operating officer at upstart Telemundo affiliate KTLM in McAllen.

Outside of WB programming, highlights of KNVA's programming in the early 2000s included syndicated reruns of Friends as well as broadcasts of San Antonio Spurs basketball and Houston Astros baseball.

=== As a CW affiliate ===
On January 24, 2006, The WB announced it would shut down and effectively merge with UPN to form The CW. The nearest UPN station was KBEJ in Fredericksburg, which was identified with the San Antonio market. The merger left many stations, most notably UPN stations owned by Fox Television Stations, without programming. The next month, News Corporation announced the creation of its own secondary network, MyNetworkTV, to serve these stations and others that had not been selected for The CW. Though KBEJ obtained a CW affiliation and became KCWX, so too did KNVA, as part of a four-station agreement with LIN announced in April 2006. LIN also affiliated KNVA and three other stations it owned with MyNetworkTV, making KNVA one of only a few dual affiliates. MyNetworkTV prime time programs aired from 9 to 11 p.m. on weeknights, immediately following CW prime time. The station was branded as The CW Austin. The new networks began programming on September 5 for MyNetworkTV and September 18 for The CW.

On July 27, 2009, as part of the settlement of a lawsuit brought by the original majority shareholders, Thomas J. Vaughan of Decatur, Illinois, acquired the equity stakes of Oliveira, LS Communications, and Goldberg-Hirsch Ventures in 54 Broadcasting for $6 million. The remainder would continue to be owned by LIN. MyNetworkTV programming moved off KNVA that fall when KXAM-TV, a semi-satellite of KXAN, was broken off as the new KBVO (channel 14). Twice within four years, KNVA got a new operator as a result of media mergers. LIN was acquired by Media General in 2014, and Nexstar Broadcasting Group acquired Media General in 2017.

KNVA served as the flagship station for Austin FC in the 2021 season. This ended in 2022 after Major League Soccer signed a 10-year broadcasting deal with Apple Inc. to air MLS matches on MLS Season Pass.

== Newscasts ==
After the 1997 cancellation of the 5:30 Report, KXAN restored news to KNVA on September 21, 2009, with the debut of the half-hour KXAN News at 9:00 on The CW Austin. The half-hour program was extended to 45 minutes on weeknights in 2015, with the remainder of the hour taken up by ATX Uncensored(ish), a satirical program hosted by Brian Gaar. ATX Uncensored(ish) was canceled in July 2016, with reruns airing until its replacement, KXAN Sports: More than the Score, debuted in September. This was a panel analysis program focusing primarily on college and high school sports featuring the KXAN sports department staff, Austin American-Statesman sportswriters, and hosts from sports radio station KTXX-FM.

Morning news was added to the KXAN lineup on September 3, 2013, with the debut of KXAN News Today on The CW Austin, running from 7 to 9 a.m. Airing against the national morning newscasts and local news on KTBC, the program featured entertainment news and updates on trending news stories from the KXAN website staff in addition to news headlines, weather forecasts and traffic reports. The morning news extension was retooled in 2018 into a version of KXAN's lifestyle program, Studio 512. In 2021, KNVA relaunched a morning news program focused on weather and traffic information in the 7–9 a.m. time slot.

== Technical information ==
=== Subchannels ===
KNVA's transmitter is on Buckman Mountain Road north of West Lake Hills. The station's signal is multiplexed:

Subchannels of KNVA
Subchannel	Res.	Short name	Programming
54.1	1080i	KNVA-HD	The CW
54.2	480i	GRIT	Grit (4:3)
54.3	480i	LAFF	Laff
54.4	480i	CourtTV	Ion Mystery → Defy (soon)
14.1	1080i	MyNet	Independent with MyNetworkTV (KBVO-CD)

Broadcast on behalf of another station

KNVA shut down its analog signal on June 12, 2009, as part of the FCC-mandated transition to digital television for full-power stations. The station's digital signal remained on its pre-transition UHF channel 49, using virtual channel 54. As a part of the broadcast frequency repacking process following the 2016-2017 FCC incentive auction, KNVA relocated its digital signal to channel 23 on June 21, 2019.

Since October 2020, the station is broadcast in ATSC 3.0 (NextGen TV) format on KBVO-CD.

=== Repeaters ===
KNVA is rebroadcast on five digital Class A low-power stations across Central Texas—all owned by Nexstar Media Group and utilizing call signs that reference their former alliance under the defunct Hill Country Paramount Network service—located in communities surrounding Austin:

Repeaters of KNVA
City of license	Call sign	Channel (virtual)	Founded	First airdate	Public license information
Georgetown	KHPX-CD	29 (28)	December 9, 1993	February 7, 1995	Public file; LMS
La Grange	KHPL-CD	15 (40)	May 10, 1990	June 4, 1992	Public file; LMS
Round Rock	KHPZ-CD	25 (15)	March 14, 1994	February 7, 1995	Public file; LMS
San Marcos	KHPM-CD	20 (40)	July 31, 1989	April 8, 1991	Public file; LMS

The five repeaters were put on the air in the early 1990s, initially as rebroadcasters of KXAN to improve reception in the Hill Country, alongside two stations that were later deleted: KHPG-CA channel 31 in Giddings (closed in 2011) and KHPB-CD channel 45 in Bastrop (canceled in 2017). In 1995, these stations became a separate entity, the Hill Country Paramount Network (also known as HPN), which simulcast KNVA's programming but substituted UPN prime time and network shows for those of The WB. The main station for Austin viewers was K49CY (channel 49).

In 1998, the Hill Country Paramount Network—without cable carriage—lost its network affiliation on six days' notice to K13VC "KVC", which was on Austin cable systems. The former HPN stations joined KBVO-CA in broadcasting Telefutura programming in 2002; Univision, owner of KAKW (channel 62), handled all programming functions for LIN during this period.
