= KEYE-TV =

Television station in Austin, Texas

- Austin, Texas; United States
- Channels: Digital: 34 (UHF); Virtual: 42
- Branding: CBS Austin; Telemundo Austin; Noticiero Austin (42.2)

Programming
- Affiliations: 42.1: CBS; 42.2: Telemundo; for others, see § Subchannels

Ownership
- Owner: Sinclair Broadcast Group; (KEYE Licensee, LLC)

History
- First air date: December 4, 1983
- Former call signs: KBVO-TV (1983–1995)
- Former channel numbers: Analog: 42 (UHF, 1983–2009); Digital: 43 (UHF, 2003–2019)
- Former affiliations: Independent (1983–1986); Fox (1986–1995)
- Call sign meaning: The CBS Eye

Technical information
- Licensing authority: FCC
- Facility ID: 33691
- ERP: 1,000 kW
- HAAT: 395 m (1,296 ft)
- Transmitter coordinates: 30°19′19.3″N 97°48′12.6″W

Links
- Public license information: Public file; LMS
- Website: cbsaustin.com

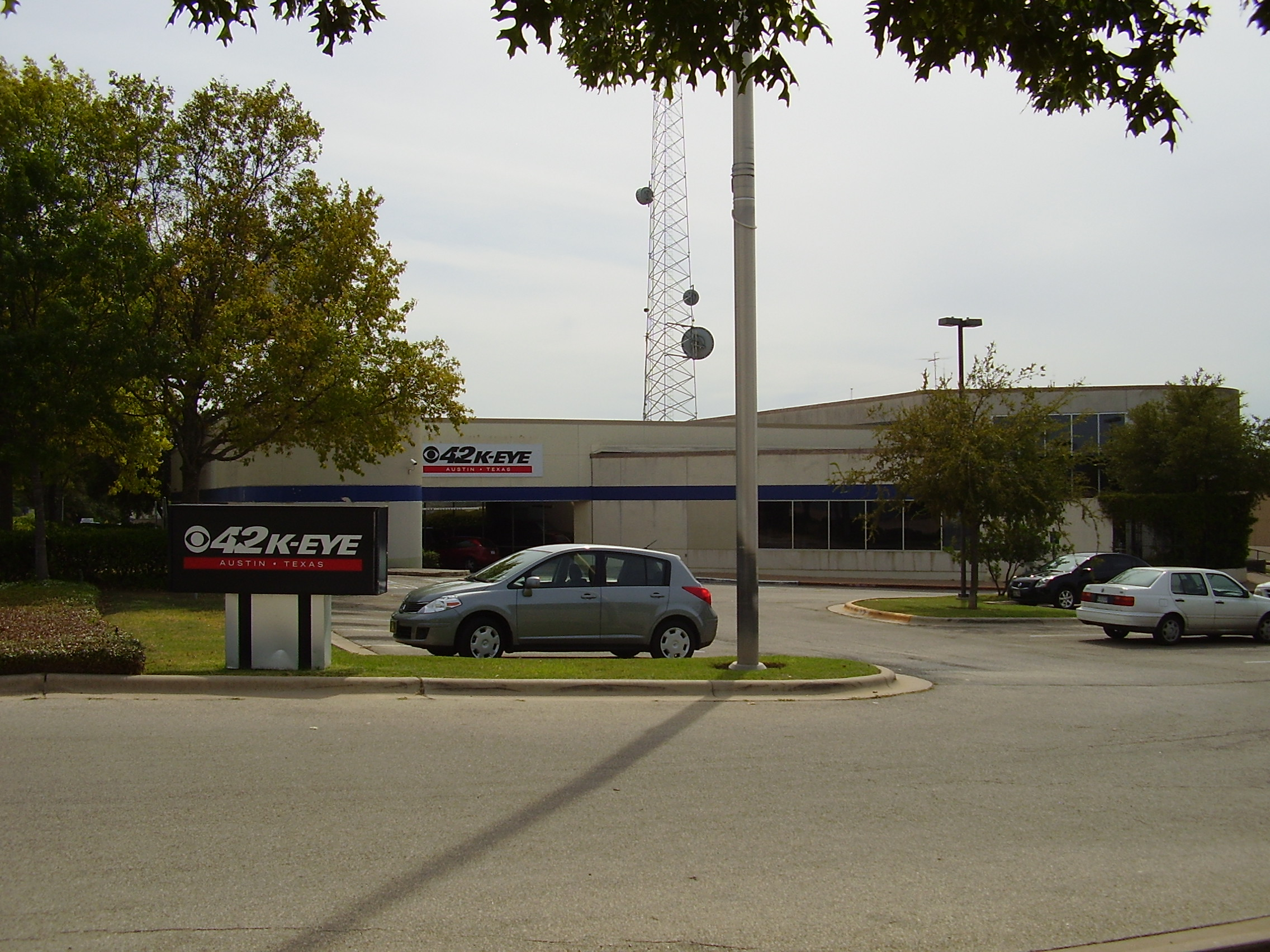
KEYE-TV's studios in Austin

KEYE-TV (channel 42) is a television station in Austin, Texas, United States, affiliated with CBS and Telemundo. Owned by Sinclair Broadcast Group, the station maintains studios on Metric Boulevard in North Austin and a transmitter on Waymaker Way on the city's west side.

Channel 42 began broadcasting on December 4, 1983, as KBVO-TV. Owned by Austin Television, a consortium of three groups that sought the license, it was Austin's first new commercial TV station since 1971 and its first local independent station. Originally emphasizing movies in its schedule, the station affiliated with the new Fox network at its launch in October 1986.

In 1994, Fox announced it would move its local affiliation to KTBC, the previous CBS affiliate, in July 1995. Austin Television, by this point owned by Darrell Cannan of Wichita Falls and KBVO-TV general manager Steve Beard, sold the station to Granite Broadcasting; Granite in turn secured an affiliation with CBS. The affiliation switch in Austin took place on July 2, 1995. On that day, channel 42 became KEYE-TV and began broadcasting local newscasts, which typically have been in third- or fourth-place positions in local ratings. After Granite purchased two large-market WB affiliates, it sold KEYE-TV to the CBS network in 1999.

CBS sold four of its smaller-market media properties, including KEYE-TV, to Cerberus Capital Management in 2007; the stations were grouped under the Four Points Media Group name and later run under contract by Nexstar Broadcasting Group. During this time, the station flipped one of its digital subchannels to an affiliate of Telemundo, complete with Spanish-language local newscasts produced by the KEYE-TV newsroom. Sinclair Broadcast Group acquired the Four Points stations in 2012.

== History ==
Channel 42 in Austin had two prior users before KEYE-TV began broadcasting. It was first assigned to KHFI-TV, which began broadcasting as Austin's second television station on February 12, 1965. The station, renamed KTVV, moved to channel 36 in January 1973. The Spanish International Network applied for a translator of KWEX-TV from San Antonio using channel 42 in 1977; this application remained pending by 1979, but K42AB began broadcasting on January 24, 1982.

=== KBVO-TV: The independent and Fox years ===
By the time the Spanish International Network sought channel 42 for a translator, interest was beginning to build around the use of the channel for a full-service TV station. A Christian group and an Austin entrepreneur each analyzed filing, but neither did, and the first official application came from Texas Television, Inc.—the broadcasting business of the McKinnon family, which owned stations in Beaumont and Corpus Christi. Four other applicants filed with the FCC to run the channel. Austin Telecasting was led by Darrold Cannan Jr., a Wichita Falls businessman and owner of KAMR-TV in Amarillo. Mountain Laurel Broadcasting was owned by Timothy R. Brown. The other two had interests in stations elsewhere: Pappas Telecasting of Visalia, California, and Television Corporation of Central Texas.

Pappas dropped out, and the four other applicants reached a settlement agreement—announced in June 1982 but not approved until March 1983 by which Television Corporation of Central Texas would be a consultant to a merger of Austin Telecasting, Mountain Laurel, and Texas Television, known as Austin Television. Steven Beard was hired as the general manager and led a search for studio space that delayed channel 42's launch. For the new independent station, he formulated a program schedule highly dependent on movies, with an estimated 25 feature films a week. Occasional sports telecasts, syndicated shows, and religious and children's programs rounded out its offerings. The Spanish International Network moved to channel 30.

From its studios on Metric Boulevard, KBVO-TV (named for Bevo, the live longhorn steer mascot of the University of Texas' sports teams) began broadcasting on December 4, 1983. It was profitable within five months of starting up. On October 9, 1986, the station became a charter affiliate of the upstart Fox network. Beard attributed the station's success to good timing and its movie identity, which helped it weather a regional economic downturn later in the 1980s.

In 1991, KBVO-TV became the first station outside of San Antonio to air a package of San Antonio Spurs basketball games. By 1994, it was one of the ten highest-rated Fox affiliates in the country; the station was now exclusively owned by Cannan and Beard.

=== From Fox to CBS ===
In May 1994, New World Communications purchased longtime CBS affiliate KTBC, which was included later that month in a groupwide affiliation deal to switch most of New World's stations to Fox. Despite KBVO's strong ratings among younger demographics, its UHF signal was inferior to KTBC's VHF signal. The move came as a shock to Beard, a member of Fox's board of governors. He told the Austin American-Statesman that he would seriously consider pursuing the soon-to-be vacant CBS affiliation for KBVO. In October 1994, Austin Television reached a deal to sell KBVO-TV for $54 million to Granite Broadcasting Corporation, which would affiliate KBVO-TV with CBS once the network was bumped from KTBC. For Cannan and Beard, the sale represented an estate planning move.

On July 2, 1995, KTBC and KBVO swapped affiliations, with Fox moving to KTBC and the CBS affiliation going to KBVO. Simultaneously with the affiliation switch, KBVO changed its call sign to KEYE-TV. Granite wanted to bolster channel 42's ties to its new network, whose main symbol is an eye, and eliminate any confusion about where CBS programming could be found in Austin. Beard's successor as general manager, Dennis Upiah, said that with the new call letters, "CBS is literally our middle name". The new owners also wanted to shed KBVO's image as a station focused on children's programming. The station began producing local newscasts that day and broke ground on a studio expansion to house its newsroom.

At the start of 1999, Granite put KEYE up for sale to help debt obligations it incurred in acquiring two larger-market affiliates of The WB, KBWB in San Francisco and WDWB in Detroit. Several large broadcast companies, including Raycom Media and Hearst-Argyle Television, expressed interest in acquiring KEYE. That April, CBS agreed to buy the station for $160 million. The sale closed that August. Under CBS, management turned over frequently, with six general managers in five years.

=== Four Points and Sinclair ownership ===
On February 7, 2007, CBS agreed to sell seven of its smaller-market stations to Cerberus Capital Management, L.P., for $185 million. Cerberus formed a new holding company for the stations, Four Points Media Group, which took over the operations of the stations through local marketing agreements in late June 2007; the sale to Four Points was consummated on January 10, 2008. Four Points operated the stations outright until March 20, 2009, when it entered into a three-year management agreement with the Irving, Texas–based Nexstar Broadcasting Group.

Sinclair Broadcast Group announced the acquisition of the Four Points stations for $200 million in September 2011. The deal was completed on January 3, 2012, at which time the Nexstar management agreement was terminated. In August 2016, the station began referring to itself as "CBS Austin".

== Telemundo Austin ==
In June 2008, KEYE began broadcasting a second digital subchannel offering programming from the Retro Television Network as well as a repeat of its morning newscast. This was replaced on October 1, 2009, with the Spanish-language network Telemundo. KEYE also debuted Spanish-language local newscasts at 5 and 10 p.m. weeknights.

== News operation ==
Before it switched to CBS, KBVO-TV had no newscasts with the exception of nightly updates aired during Fox prime time programming from a small closet studio. After the affiliation swap, on July 3, 1995, KEYE immediately launched a full slate of newscasts, under the moniker K-EYEWitness News. Veteran anchorman Neal Spelce, formerly of KTBC, was hired as part of the new operation, and the station's Metric Boulevard studios were expanded to house the news department.

In launching a news operation, station management hoped that the locally high ratings for CBS network news on KTBC would transfer to channel 42. This was not the case, and technical miscues in the weeks after opening alienated viewers. Early on, the station rated fourth of the four major TV news operations in town, but it soon surpassed KTBC, whose news ratings severely slumped after the switch. Its news programs were faster-paced than the competition with a higher-than-average reliance on props and unconventional methods of storytelling. Spelce retired in 2002, becoming "anchor emeritus" and a commentator with occasional contributions to KEYE's newscasts. By that time, the station was struggling in the ratings, with sitcom reruns occasionally drawing more viewers than channel 42's newscasts; it canceled its noon newscast as a result. It fired three anchors—including Cile Spelce, Neal's daughter—at the end of 2002 and hired Judy Maggio from KVUE several months later. CBS also made investments in weather forecasting and anchor salaries as well as $15 million to make KEYE the city's first TV station with high-definition local newscasts in 2007, with the Four Points sale in progress.

The station canceled its 5 p.m. newscast in September 2009, replacing it with We Are Austin Live, an hour-long 4 p.m. lifestyle show anchored by Michelle Valles and Jason Wheeler. A few weeks later, the weekday morning newscast was canceled and later replaced with a simulcast of the J. B. and Sandy Morning Show from KAMX (94.7 FM), leaving KEYE with its 6 and 10 p.m. newscasts and a 5:30 p.m. newscast on Sunday evenings. On June 30, 2011, after the station was unable to renew its agreement with KAMX owner Entercom, KEYE replaced the simulcast of the J. B. and Sandy Morning Show with the in-house newscast We Are Austin Mornings, a morning extension of We Are Austin Live similar in format to national network morning newscasts. We Are Austin Mornings lasted less than a year before being replaced with a more conventional morning newscast. The 2009 afternoon news changes were reversed in June 2012, when We Are Austin Live was canceled to make way for the reinstatement of a 5 p.m. newscast. The We Are Austin name was revived in 2014 when the station reintroduced it for a 9 a.m. lifestyle show; simultaneously, KEYE extended its morning news to start at 4:30 a.m., giving it a weekday news output of five hours. During this time, the station had a short-lived improvement in its ratings; in the May 2012 sweeps, it had the highest-rated 10 p.m. newscast in the market.

In 2017, the station placed third or fourth in all of the time slots where it aired a newscast. In March 2021, it tied KVUE for second place at 10 p.m. but had half as many viewers in the target demographic of viewers 25–54.

KEYE-TV also provides weeknight weather updates for Sinclair-owned WUCW in Minneapolis–Saint Paul, which are presented by KEYE's chief meteorologist Chikage Windler.

=== Notable former on-air staff ===
- Robert Flores – sports director, 2000–2004; fired for an expletive in a mistakenly aired recorded segment
- Shaun Robinson – 5 p.m. anchor, 1995–1996

== Technical information ==
=== Subchannels ===
KEYE-TV is broadcast from a transmitter facility on Waymaker Way in west Austin. The station's signal is multiplexed:

Subchannels of KEYE-TV
Subchannel	Res.	Short name	Programming
42.1	1080i	CBS	CBS
42.2	1080i	T-Mundo	Telemundo
42.3	480i	Charge!	Charge!
42.4	480i	Comet	Comet
14.2	480i	Bounce	Bounce TV (KBVO) (4:3)
14.3	480i	Antenna	Antenna TV (KBVO)

Broadcast on behalf of another station

KEYE-TV broadcasts two subchannels of KBVO-CD as part of Austin's ATSC 3.0 (NextGen TV) deployment plan. KBVO-CD began 3.0 broadcasting in October 2020.

=== Analog-to-digital conversion ===
KEYE-TV shut down its analog signal on February 17, 2009; it was the first Austin station to cease analog broadcasting. The station's digital signal remained on its pre-transition UHF channel 43, using virtual channel 42. KEYE-TV moved its digital signal from channel 43 to channel 34 on June 21, 2019, as a result of the 2016 United States wireless spectrum auction.
