= KTBC (TV) =

Television station in Austin, Texas

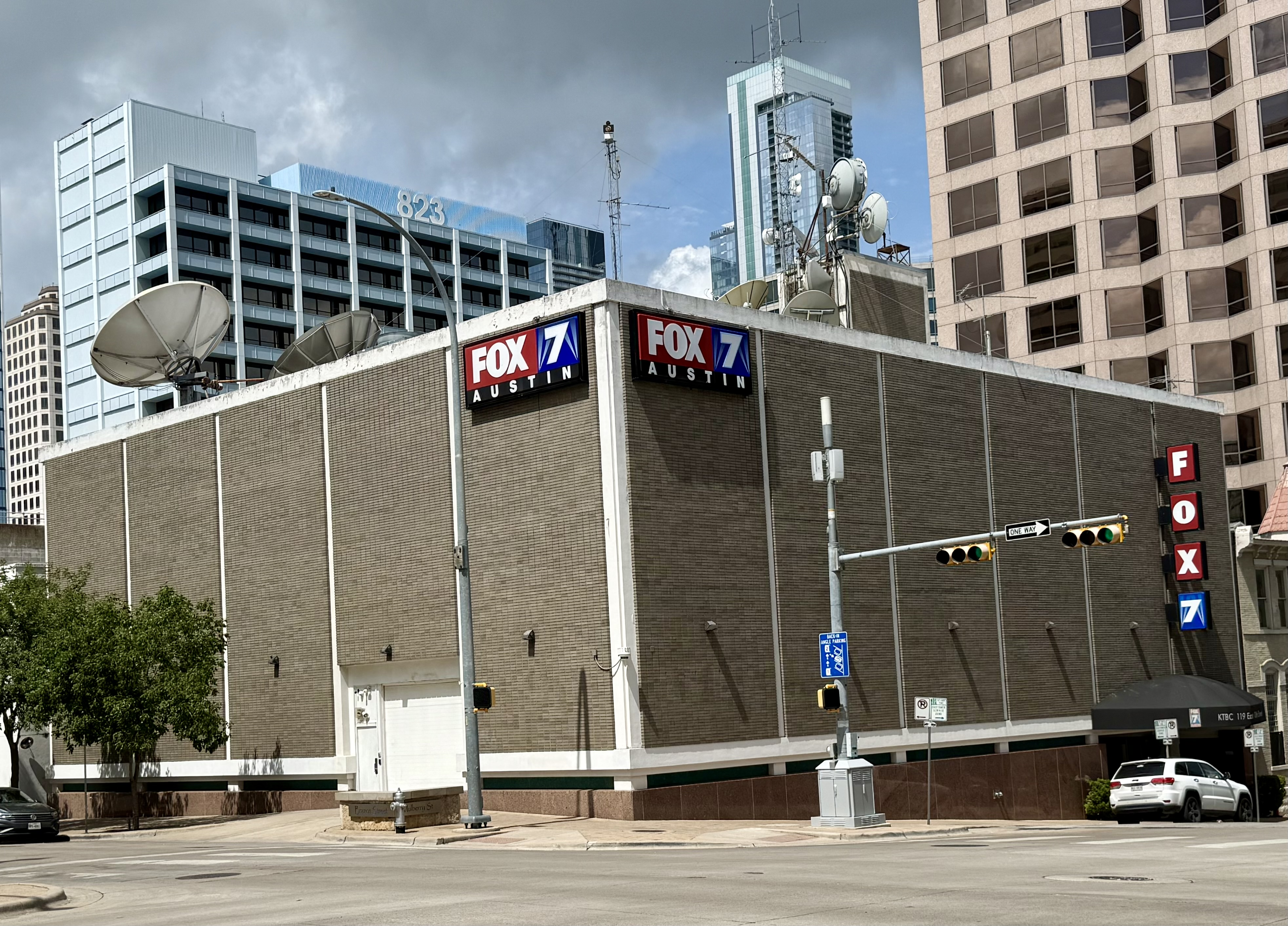
- Studios in Austin
- Austin, Texas; United States
- Channels: Digital: 7 (VHF); Virtual: 7
- Branding: Fox 7 Austin

Programming
- Affiliations: 7.1: Fox; for others, see § Subchannels

Ownership
- Owner: Fox Television Stations; (NW Communications of Austin, Inc.)

History
- First air date: November 27, 1952
- Former call signs: KTBC-TV (1952–1998)
- Former channel numbers: Analog: 7 (VHF, 1952–2009); Digital: 56 (UHF, 1997–2009)
- Former affiliations: CBS (1952–1995); DuMont (secondary, 1952–1956); NBC (secondary, 1952–1966); ABC (secondary, 1952–1971)
- Call sign meaning: Texas Broadcasting Company (former owners)

Technical information
- Licensing authority: FCC
- Facility ID: 35649
- ERP: 98.6 kW
- HAAT: 383 m (1,257 ft)
- Transmitter coordinates: 30°18′35″N 97°47′34″W

Links
- Public license information: Public file; LMS
- Website: www.fox7austin.com

KTBC (channel 7) is a television station in Austin, Texas, United States, serving as the market's Fox network outlet. It is owned and operated by the network's Fox Television Stations division, and maintains studios on East 10th Street near the Texas State Capitol in downtown Austin; its transmitter is based at the West Austin Antenna Farm on Mount Larson.

== History ==
=== Early years with CBS ===
KTBC-TV aired its first television broadcast on Thursday, November 27, 1952, becoming the first television station in Austin and Central Texas. Originally housed in a small studio in the Driskill Hotel, the station was first owned by the Texas Broadcasting Company (from whom the call letters are taken), which was in turn owned by then-Senator and future U.S. President Lyndon B. Johnson and his wife Lady Bird, alongside KTBC radio (590 AM and 93.7 FM). Lady Bird Johnson used the money from her family inheritance to purchase KTBC-TV, and she remained active with her radio station until she was in her eighties, which led her to become the first president's wife to have become a millionaire on her own. It carried all four major networks at the time: ABC, CBS, NBC and the now-defunct DuMont Television Network. However, it was a primary CBS affiliate. In its early history, it carried roughly 65% of CBS's schedule; NBC and ABC roughly split the remaining coverage in half.

In 1960, the staff of channel 7 produced a film for the Texas Department of Public Safety, entitled Target Austin. The 20-minute film presents the scenario of a nuclear missile strike on the outskirts of Austin and follows the storylines of several characters from the CONELRAD broadcast to the announcement that it is safe to emerge from shelter. The film takes place in Austin, highlighting several iconic locations in the city, and featured an Austin-based cast and crew: including director Gordon Wilkison (of KTBC), narrator Cactus Pryor (also of KTBC), actress Coleen Hardin, and El Rancho restaurant owner Matt Martinez.

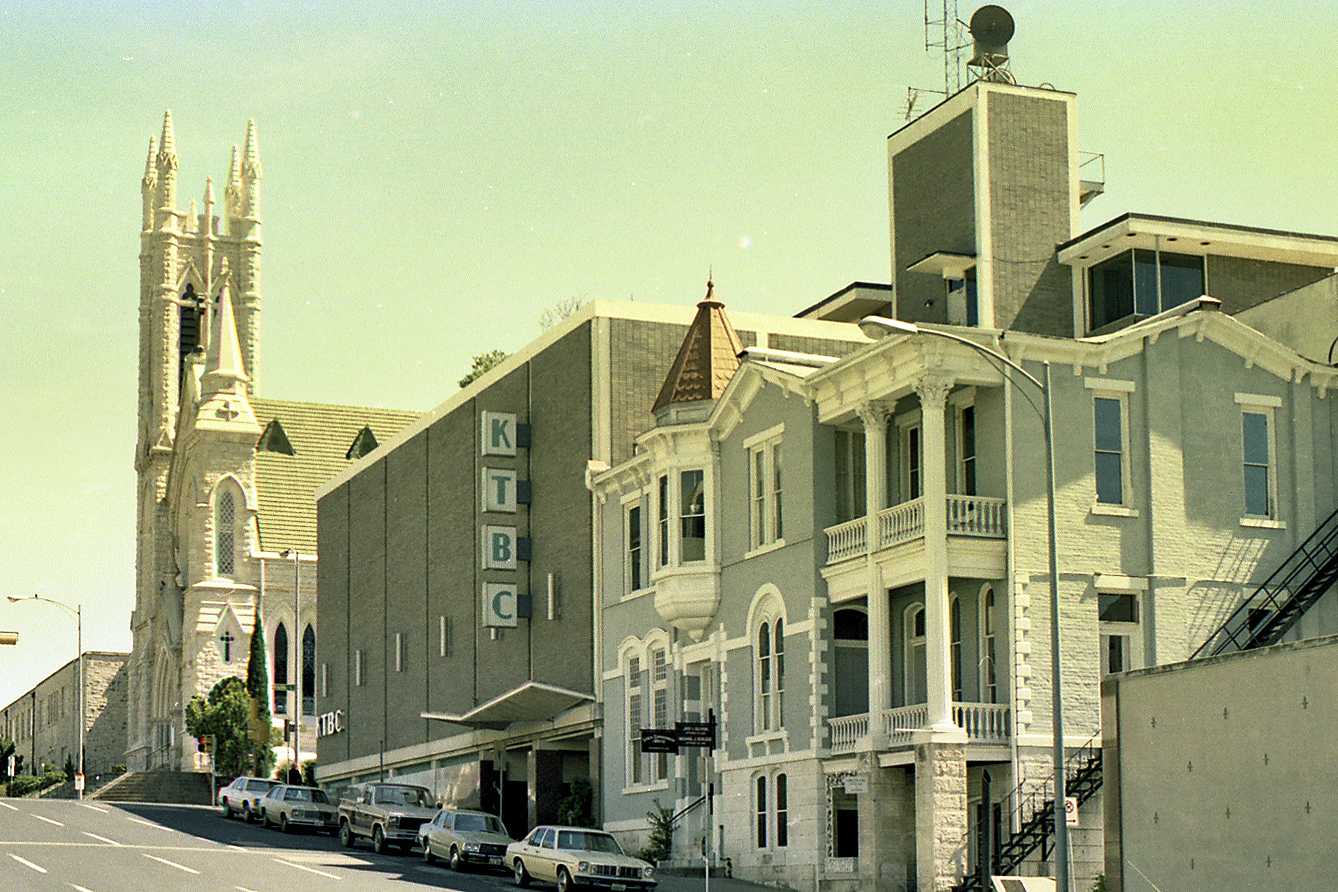
KTBC-TV studios, on East Tenth Street in downtown Austin, circa 1980.

KTBC-TV benefited from a quirk in the Federal Communications Commission (FCC)'s plan for allocating stations. In the early days of broadcast television, there were twelve VHF channels available and 69 UHF channels (later reduced to 55 in 1983). The VHF bands were more desirable because they carried longer distances. Since there were only twelve VHF channels available, there were limitations as to how closely the stations could be spaced.

After the FCC's Sixth Report and Order ended the license freeze and opened the UHF band in 1952, it devised a plan for allocating VHF licenses. Under this plan, almost all of the country would be able to receive two commercial VHF channels plus one noncommercial channel. Most of the rest of the country ("1/2") would be able to receive a third VHF channel. Other areas would be designated as "UHF islands" since they were too close to larger cities for VHF service. The "2" networks became CBS and NBC, "+1" represented non-commercial educational stations, and "1/2" became ABC (which was the weakest network usually winding up with the UHF allocation where no VHF was available).

However, Austin is sandwiched between San Antonio (channels 4, 5, 9, and 12) to the south, Houston (channels 2, 8, 11, and 13) to the east, Waco–Temple–Bryan (channels 3, 6, and 10) to the north, and San Angelo (channels 3 and 8) to the west. This created a large doughnut in central Texas where there could be only one VHF license, which became KTBC-TV. Additionally, UHF signals usually do not travel very far over long distances or over rugged terrain. Even though Austin was large enough on paper to support three full network affiliates as early as the 1950s, the technical limitations made several potential owners skittish about the prospects for UHF in a market that stretched from Mason in the west to La Grange in the east, and also included much of the Hill Country. (Note: Of note, while KTBC was the only full-market VHF outlet in Austin, one of the San Antonio–based VHF outlets, PBS member station KLRN also served Austin in the 1960s and 1970s with a signal that covered both markets midway from a transmitter near New Braunfels until 1979 when the station started to focus on San Antonio exclusively and KLRU was launched to serve Austin.)

One of KTBC's logos as a CBS affiliate.

As a result, KTBC-TV was the only station in Austin until KHFI-TV (channel 42, now KXAN-TV on channel 36) signed on in February 1965. NBC programming continued to be broadcast solely on KTBC-TV for the next 18 months due to contractual obligations. Channel 7 became an exclusive CBS affiliate when all of ABC's programming moved to KVUE (channel 24) when that station first signed on in September 1971.

After Lyndon Johnson became president following the assassination of President John F. Kennedy in 1963, the networks established direct feed lines between KTBC and the various network affiliates in New York City, Dallas and Chicago. This facilitated news reports relayed while the President was residing either in Austin or at his ranch in Johnson City. News reports were also relayed in the president's Oval Office or in his private study at the White House. The Johnsons maintained a penthouse apartment on the fifth floor of the station, which was wired for camera and sound equipment, and used on occasion for local programming on occasions when the Johnsons were away.

This multi-network capability was first demonstrated live on August 1, 1966, following the UT Tower sniper incident. After Charles Whitman's sniper rampage had been stopped, the primary newsman on the scene, Neal Spelce, presented a wrap-up of the event that was carried on all three networks live later that evening. Although the connections were later replaced by satellite uplink technology, the lines were maintained for contingency usage for several years.

After he became president, President Johnson and his family's ownership of KTBC-TV was the source of investigative journalism and reporting, including a front-page story in The Wall Street Journal in March 1964 written by reporter Louis M. Kohlmeier. With a headline that included "How President's Wife Built $17,500 Into Big Fortune in Television", Kohlmeier's reporting and the work done by other reporters and journalists at the time raised questions regarding the former vice president and then President's influence on behalf of the Austin station.

In 1972, new FCC regulations forced the Johnsons to sell KTBC-TV to the Los Angeles-based Times Mirror Company, who had recently purchased KDFW-TV in Dallas. The Johnsons had acquired a large stake in a Texas cable television company, and when the FCC required them to sell one or the other, the Johnsons chose to keep the cable company. They also kept the KTBC radio properties, and under then-FCC guidelines changed the stations' call letters to KLBJ-AM-FM. In 1994, Times Mirror sold KTBC-TV to Argyle Television.

Outside the Austin market, KTBC and all other Austin stations previously served out-of-market coverage on cable systems in both Bryan and College Station for more than two decades, as well as some cable systems in portions of the Waco–Temple–Killeen market.

In January 1994, KTBC began to manage low-power independent station K13VC (known as "KVC 13" on-air) under a local marketing agreement with that station's owner, Global Information Technologies. The LMA allowed KTBC to cross-promote its programming with K13VC for the next nine years until March 29, 2003, when K13VC was shut down due to the channel 13 allocation being utilized for the digital signal for Univision owned-and-operated station KAKW.

=== From CBS to Fox affiliation ===
In December 1993, Fox outbid CBS to obtain the broadcast rights to football games from the National Football Conference of the NFL. In 1994, New World Communications signed a long-term affiliation deal with Fox, which was establishing itself as a major network and was looking for more VHF stations. In the case of Austin, the original KBVO-TV (channel 42) was among the top 10 rated Fox affiliates in the U.S. at the time, yet Fox considered KTBC a far more desirable affiliate prospect due to its VHF dial position.

In late 1994, most New World-owned stations (except for two) dropped their longtime "Big Three" affiliations and switched to Fox. On January 19, 1995, New World took over operations of the Argyle stations through time brokerage agreements. Nearly three months later, New World completed its merger with Argyle.

The last CBS network program to air on KTBC was a repeat of Walker, Texas Ranger at 9 p.m. Central Time on July 1, 1995, the day that channel 7 ended its 43-year affiliation with the network and became a Fox affiliate; the CBS affiliation went to former Fox affiliate KBVO-TV, which changed its call letters to KEYE-TV. KEYE was the only logical choice as the market's replacement CBS affiliate, as both KXAN and KVUE had long-term affiliation contracts with NBC and ABC respectively at the time. As the new Fox affiliate, channel 7 was able to continue as Austin's unofficial "home" of the Dallas Cowboys, because of Fox's rights to the NFC. KTBC had carried most Cowboys games since the team's inception in 1960 by virtue of CBS winning television rights to the NFL in 1956. For many years, it also carried Cowboys preseason games, though those telecasts moved to KEYE in 2006.

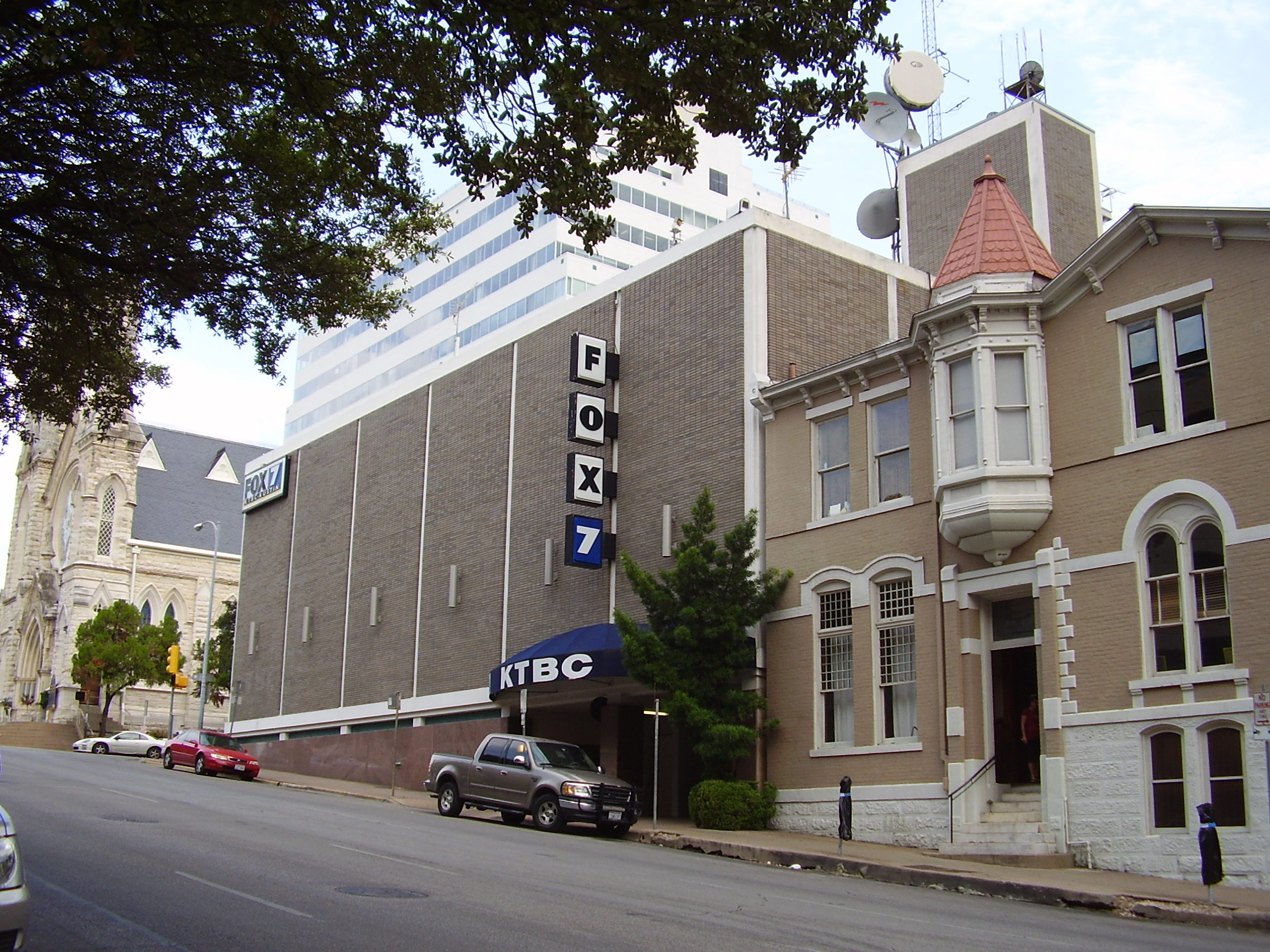
KTBC studios, circa 2008

In its early years as a Fox station, KTBC filled its daytime lineup with talk shows and the nighttime schedule with off-network sitcoms. Although Channel 7 acquired the rights to most of Fox's programming, KTBC and K13VC initially split the local broadcast rights to the network's children's programming block, Fox Kids, as KTBC station management declined to carry the block's weekday lineup, a move which had become standard practice for the other New World stations that had joined Fox since September 1994. KTBC only took the Saturday morning Fox Kids lineup, and simulcast it in conjunction with K13VC until September 1997, when the former ceded its partial rights to Fox Kids exclusively to Channel 13 and replaced it with real estate, paid and E/I-compliant programs. (K13VC continued to air the weekday children's block until Fox discontinued it, confining Fox Kids programming, to Saturdays on December 31, 2001; it began carrying Fox Kids successor, the FoxBox, on September 14, 2002, and continued to air that block until the station ceased operations in 2003. Neither the block, renamed to 4KidsTV in 2005 nor its successor, Weekend Marketplace, have been carried in the Austin market since.)

The station came under the ownership of Fox when New World merged with Fox Television Stations in 1996; this made KTBC the first owned-and-operated network station in the Austin market. With the exclusion of semi-satellite outlets, KTBC has always been the smallest O&O under Fox's portfolio, as the fast-growing Austin region did not become a Top 50 market until the late 2000s. In the spring of 1997, a rumor that KTBC and Phoenix's KSAZ-TV would be traded to the Belo Corporation in exchange for Seattle's KIRO-TV circulated, but this deal never came to fruition. Belo would acquire rival KVUE and Phoenix's KTVK two years later.

== News operation ==
As of October 2021, KTBC presently broadcasts 50 1/2 hours of locally produced newscasts each week (with 8 1/2 hours each weekday, four hours each on Saturdays and Sundays); the most of all the broadcast television stations in the Austin market. KTBC's Sunday 5 p.m. newscast is subject to preemption due to network sports coverage, as is standard with Fox stations that carry early evening weekend newscasts (though the Saturday 5 p.m. newscast is usually delayed to 6 p.m. due to baseball or college football coverage).

In August 2000, KTBC moved its evening newscast from 10 p.m. to 9 p.m.

KTBC was Austin's only television station for nearly 12 years, until KHFI began broadcasting in 1965.

In 1996, Nielsen ratings placed KVUE's newscasts first in Austin, ahead of KXAN and KTBC.

=== Former on-air news talent ===
- Judd Hambrick
- Alan Krashesky

== Technical information ==
=== Subchannels ===
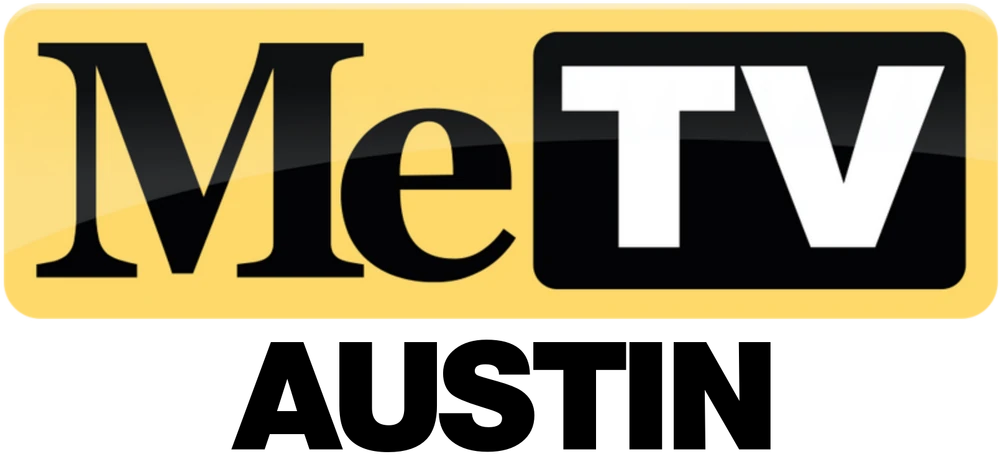
DT4 logo

The station's signal is multiplexed:

Subchannels of KTBC
Subchannel	Res.	Short name	Programming
7.1	720p	KTBC-HD	Fox
7.2	480i	Movies!	Movies!
7.3	480i	Buzzr	Buzzr (4:3)
7.4	480i	MeTV	MeTV
7.5	480i	Catchy	Catchy Comedy
7.6	480i	FoxWX	Fox Weather
62.11	480i	UNIV	Univision in SD (KAKW-DT)

Simulcast of subchannels of another station

=== Analog-to-digital conversion ===
KTBC shut down its analog signal on June 12, 2009, as part of the FCC-mandated transition to digital television for full-power stations. The station's digital signal relocated from its pre-transition UHF channel 56, which was among the high band UHF channels (52–69) that were removed from broadcasting use as a result of the transition, to its analog-era VHF channel 7 for post-transition operations.
