= KVUE =

Television station in Austin, Texas

- Austin, Texas; United States
- Channels: Digital: 33 (UHF); Virtual: 24
- Branding: KVUE

Programming
- Affiliations: 24.1: ABC; for others, see § Subchannels

Ownership
- Owner: Tegna Inc., a subsidiary of Nexstar Media Group; (KVUE Television, Inc.)
- Sister stations: Nexstar: KXAN-TV, KNVA, KBVO

History
- First air date: September 12, 1971
- Former channel numbers: Analog: 24 (UHF, 1971–2009)
- Call sign meaning: "K-VUE", pronounced "k-view"

Technical information
- Licensing authority: FCC
- Facility ID: 35867
- ERP: 1,000 kW
- HAAT: 376 m (1,234 ft)
- Transmitter coordinates: 30°19′18″N 97°48′11″W

Links
- Public license information: Public file; LMS
- Website: www.kvue.com

KVUE (channel 24) is a television station in Austin, Texas, United States, affiliated with ABC. It is owned by the Tegna subsidiary of Nexstar Media Group; Nexstar also owns NBC affiliate KXAN-TV (channel 36) and KBVO (channel 14), an independent station with MyNetworkTV, and operates CW station KNVA (channel 54). KVUE's studios are located on Steck Avenue just east of Loop 1 in northwest Austin, and its transmitter is located on the West Austin antenna farm northwest of downtown.

KVUE was the third television station established in Austin, going on the air in 1971 as an ABC affiliate. Originally owned by a consortium of Texas investors including former governor Allan Shivers, it was purchased by the Evening News Association in 1978. Under Evening News and Gannett, which first owned the station from 1986 to 1999, channel 24 became a force in the Austin news ratings, and in the 1990s its approach to crime coverage attracted national media attention. Gannett traded KVUE to the Belo Corporation in 1999 in exchange for KXTV in Sacramento, California, and $55 million; the deal gave the Dallas-based Belo a station in Austin and coverage of two-thirds of TV households in Texas. Gannett and Belo merged in 2013.

== History ==
=== Pre-launch and construction ===
In the fall of 1961, the Federal Communications Commission (FCC) began to receive applications for channel 24 in Austin. Applicants included Dalton Homer Cobb, a Midland oilman who owned that city's KDCD-TV (channel 18), and John R. Powley of Altoona, Pennsylvania (whose Texas Longhorn Broadcasting Company sought channel 67). They were soon followed by an Austin radio station in business for 15 years and also seeking channel 24: KVET (1300 AM), which filed on December 12, 1961, in anticipation of a future day when a UHF station could be viable. The Cobb and KVET bids were designated for hearing by the FCC in 1962, and KVET got the nod on March 13, 1963.

While KVET manager Willard Deason announced the station would be built at "deliberate speed" and be on the air by early 1965, Austinites would have to wait some time to see it. In 1965, KVET was sold to Butler Broadcasting, channel 24 construction permit included. Butler announced a start date in February or March 1966, then a fall 1967 launch was floated.

KVET filed to sell the construction permit in 1968 to McAlister Television Enterprises, owner of KSEL-TV in Lubbock, for $44,000. McAlister sold a majority stake to several other investors which included former governor Allan Shivers, resulting in the creation of the Channel Twenty-Four Corporation as the assignee. The FCC approved in June 1970; the KVET-TV call letters were changed to KVUE, and a site in what was then far north Austin along Shoal Creek was selected for the studios.

The station signed on the air on September 12, 1971, after winds from Hurricane Fern delayed the intended start-up. KVUE was the market's first full-time ABC affiliate and finally gave the capital city the full program lineups from all three networks; prior to KVUE's sign-on, the network's programming had previously been limited to off-hour clearances on KTBC-TV and KHFI-TV.

=== Growth and ownership changes ===
In 1978, the Evening News Association, publisher of The Detroit News and owner of several television stations, purchased KVUE; it was the last locally owned TV station in the market to be sold. Under Evening News, the station added 13,000 square feet (1,200 m^{2}) to its studio facility, doubling its size, in an expansion begun in 1985. The station also successfully repelled a 1984 attack by a gunman who wished to broadcast a political manifesto; employees tricked him into thinking his statement was broadcast on the air, and he was arrested after reading his statement.

After a hostile takeover bid by Norman Lear and Jerry Perenchio was rebuffed, Evening News put itself up for sale and was purchased by the Gannett Company in 1985, a transaction that closed in February 1986. A second expansion of the studios was conducted in 1991, this time adding another 9,400 square feet (870 m^{2}) to house the newsroom.

One of the state's most important owners of media properties was Belo Corporation. It owned The Dallas Morning News and TV stations in most of the state's important cities: KHOU-TV in Houston, WFAA-TV in Dallas, and KENS-TV in San Antonio. However, it lacked an Austin property and coveted one, particularly given its impending launch of Texas Cable News (TXCN). In February 1999, Gannett agreed to a trade with Belo: Belo received KVUE, while Gannett received KXTV in Sacramento, and $55 million. With the addition of KVUE, TXCN could provide news and information from the four largest cities in Texas, and Belo gained coverage of two-thirds of Texas households. The deal was particularly surprising from a monetary standpoint given that KXTV was in a much larger market than Austin.

On June 13, 2013, Gannett announced that it would acquire Belo for $1.5 billion. The sale was completed on December 23. Gannett then split into print and broadcast companies in 2015, with the broadcast company taking on the name Tegna.

On February 22, 2022, Tegna announced that it would be acquired by Standard General and Apollo Global Management for $5.4 billion. As a part of the deal, KVUE, along with its Dallas sister stations WFAA and KMPX and Houston sister stations KHOU and KTBU, would be resold to Cox Media Group. The deal was canceled on May 22, 2023.

On August 19, 2025, Nexstar Media Group agreed to acquire Tegna for $6.2 billion. In Austin, Nexstar already owned KXAN-TV, KNVA, and KBVO. The deal was completed on March 19, 2026, with Nexstar being allowed by the FCC to hold three TV station licenses in applicable markets. A temporary restraining order issued one week later by the U.S. District Court for the Eastern District of California, later escalated to a preliminary injunction, has prevented KVUE from being integrated into KXAN, KBVO and KNVA.

== News operation ==
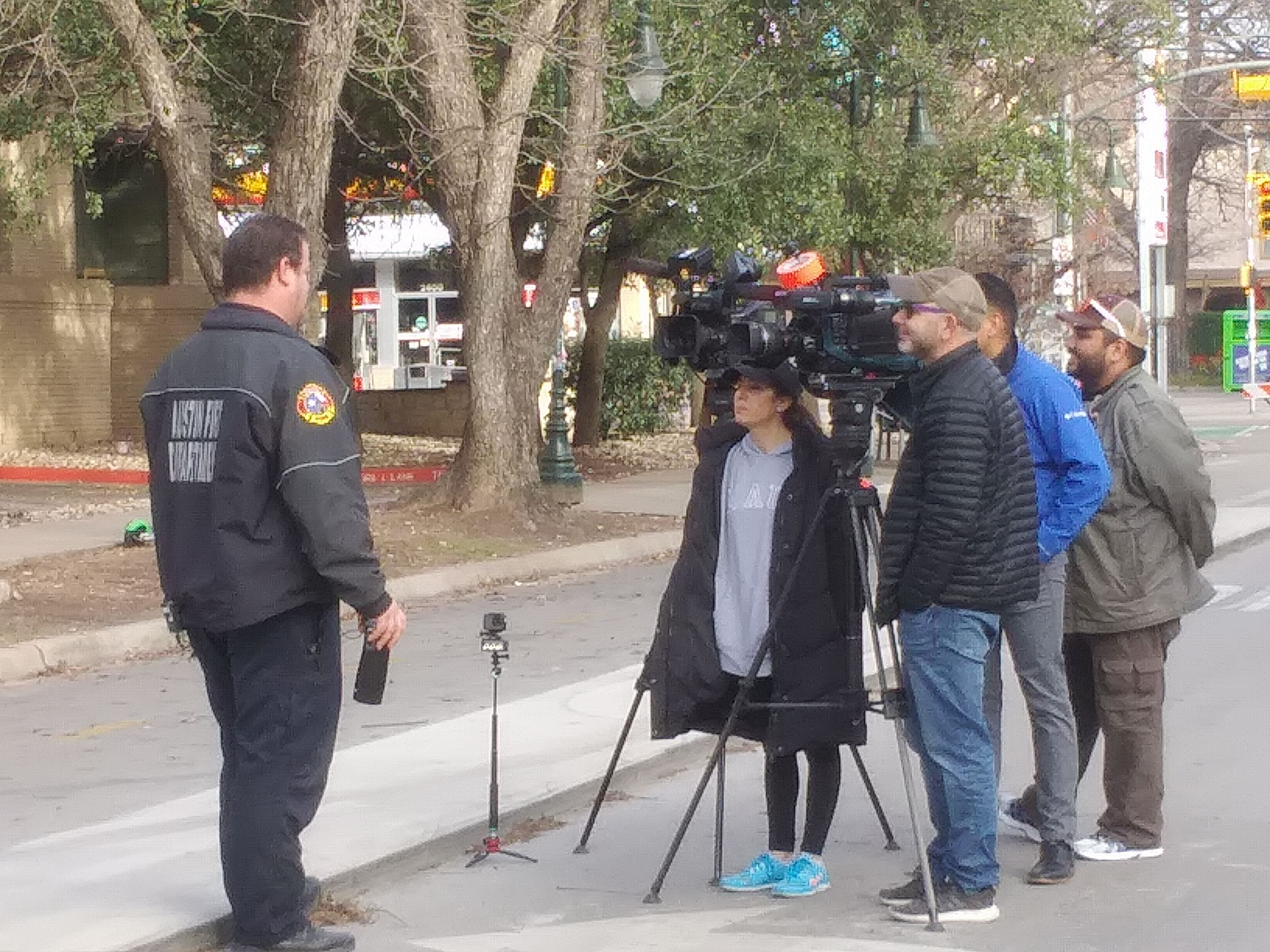
KVUE reporters and camera personnel participating in an interview

KVUE was the first Austin-market television station to make a serious challenge in the local news race, which even after the introduction of two UHF competitors was dominated by KTBC. In May 1981, its Action News edged out KTBC at 6 and 10 p.m. The station remained a solid first place for the next several years, but a spirited competition emerged between channels 7 and 24 in the ratings for the rest of the decade, with KVUE and KTBC leading at different times. KVUE continued to dominate in the ratings after the 1995 switch of CBS and Fox affiliations, which caused KXAN to surge into second place and a slide for KTBC.

Under news director Carole Kneeland, who guided the KVUE newsroom from 1989 until her death from breast cancer in 1998, the station scaled back its crime coverage to reduce the level of "mayhem" it reported—which resulted in national attention in such publications as Columbia Journalism Review and even a feature on ABC's Nightline—and introduced fact-checking of political advertising, a practice soon adopted by stations across the United States. However, by the last years of Gannett ownership, KXAN had started to edge ahead of KVUE, replacing KTBC as channel 24's main competition. The competition between channels 24 and 36 has generally defined Austin television news since; in May 2021, KVUE came second to KXAN in early and late evening news.

In 2014, KVUE won a Peabody Award for a documentary entitled The Cost of Troubled Minds, about Texas's underinvestment in addressing mental health care; this was the first Peabody won by an Austin television station.

KVUE was tricked in 2021 into promoting a fake sexual wellness product, "invented" by a team working for late-night political commentary show Last Week Tonight, called the "Venus Veil", which was actually just a blanket; the show's team paid KVUE $2,650 to feature the fake product and an interview with its "creator" as a way to illustrate how stations such as KVUE promote sponsored content without being upfront about the sponsorship, essentially passing off advertising as news.

=== Notable former on-air staff ===
- Walt Maciborski – anchor
- Arthel Neville – reporter
- Fred Roggin – sports anchor, 1978–1979
- Casey Stegall – anchor/reporter, 2004–2005

== Technical information ==
=== Subchannels ===
KVUE's transmitter is located in west Austin. The station's signal is multiplexed:

Subchannels of KVUE
Subchannel	Res.	Short name	Programming
24.1	720p	KVUE-DT	ABC
24.2	480i	NVUE-TV	Estrella TV
24.3	480i	Crime	True Crime Network
24.4	480i	Quest	Quest
24.5	480i	NEST	The Nest
24.6	480i	Outlaw	Outlaw
24.7	480i	BUSTED	Busted
24.8	480i	ShopLC	Shop LC

=== Analog-to-digital conversion ===
KVUE ended regular programming on its analog signal on February 17, 2009, as part of the FCC-mandated transition to digital television for full-power stations (which Congress had moved the previous month to June 12). The station's digital signal remained on its pre-transition UHF channel 33, using virtual channel 24.

As part of the SAFER Act, KVUE kept its analog signal on the air until June 27 to inform viewers of the digital television transition through a loop of public service announcements from the National Association of Broadcasters.
