= Belo Corporation =

American media company (1926–2013)

Coordinates: 32°46′35″N 96°48′20″W

- Formerly: A. H. Belo Corporation (1926–2000)
- Type: Public
- Traded as: NYSE: BLC
- Industry: Broadcasting, Television, Interactive media
- Founded: 1926; 100 years ago
- Defunct: December 23, 2013; 12 years ago
- Fate: Acquired by Gannett; Newspapers spun-off in 2008 to A. H. Belo Corporation; Broadcast assets merged into Tegna Inc.
- Successor: Gannett; Tegna Inc.; Nexstar Media Group; DallasNews Corporation
- Headquarters: Dallas, Texas, United States
- Key people: Dunia Shive (president and CEO)
- Revenue: ▲US$687 million (FY 2010)
- Operating income: ▲US$216 million (FY 2010)
- Net income: ▲US$86.9 million (FY 2010)
- Total assets: ▲US$1.59 billion (FY 2010)
- Total equity: ▲US$171 million (FY 2010)
- Number of employees: 6,600
- Website: belo.com

Belo Corporation (/ˈbiːloʊ/; formerly A. H. Belo Corporation) was a Dallas, Texas-based media company that owned 20 commercial broadcasting television stations and three regional 24-hour cable news television channels. Until 2008, the company also owned seven newspapers, which were ultimately spun off into a separate company named DallasNews Corporation. Belo was named after former owner Alfred Horatio Belo. Belo had its headquarters in the Belo Building in Downtown Dallas, designed by Dallas architects Omniplan and constructed between 1983 and 1985.

== History ==
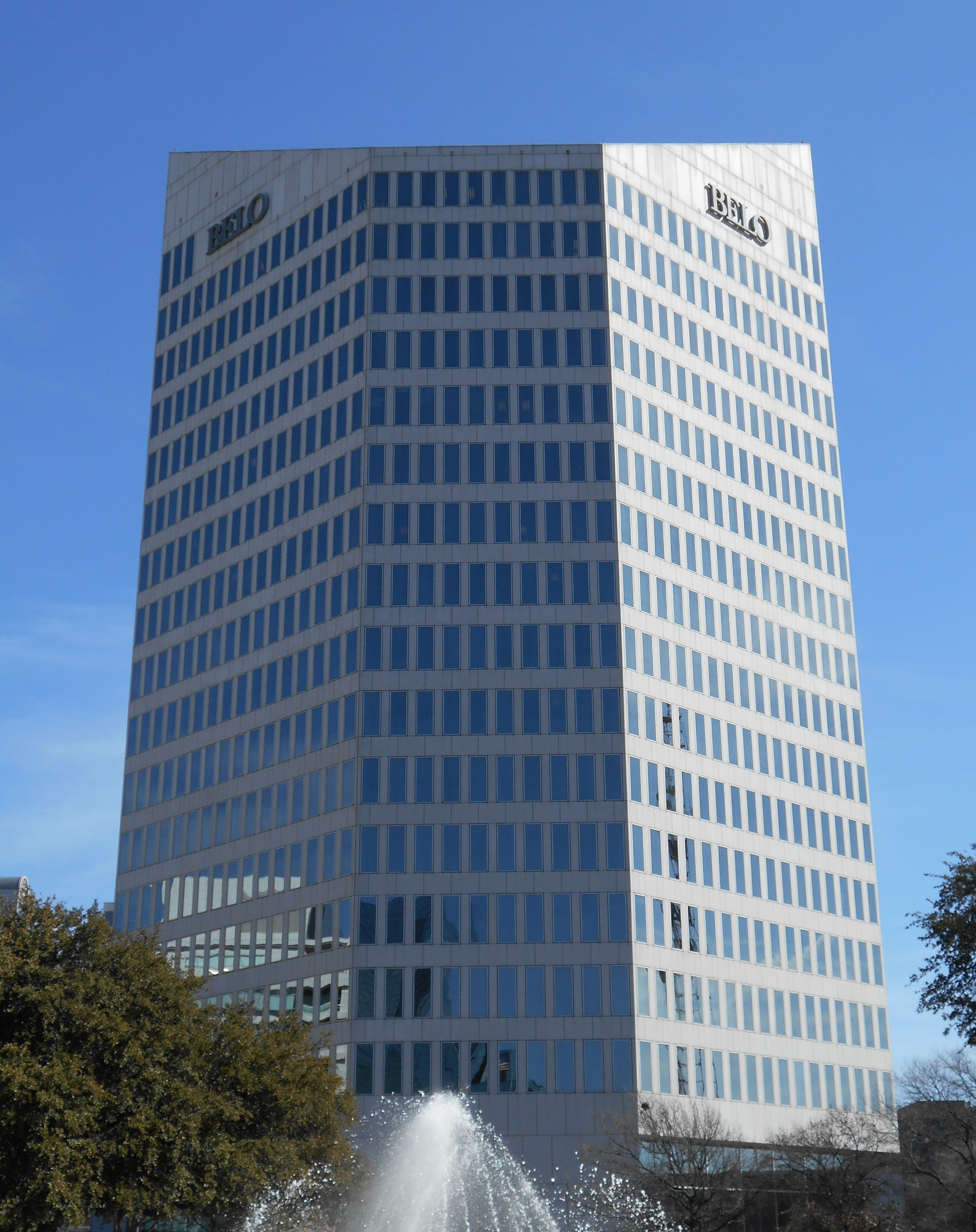
The Belo Tower (now called 400 Record) in downtown Dallas

The company traces its roots back to the establishment of The Daily News in Galveston, Texas, in 1842, four years before the Republic of Texas was annexed by the United States; the company sold The Daily News in 1923. In 1857, the company began publishing the Texas Almanac, a reference book focused on Texas, and on October 1, 1885, launched a second newspaper, The Dallas Morning News, based in Dallas, Texas.

On June 26, 1922, the company expanded into broadcasting with the sign-on of WFAA-AM (at that time, shared time with WBAP and WRR in Dallas, Texas).

In July 1926, A.H. Belo Corporation was founded when George Bannerman Dealey acquired a majority interest in the company. The company was named after Dallas Morning News founder Alfred Horatio Belo.

On January 30, 1950, the company announced the purchase of DuMont-affiliated Dallas television station KBTV (renamed WFAA after the acquisition) for $575,000. This purchase, approved by the Federal Communications Commission (FCC) on March 13, 1950, and completed on March 17, marked the company's entry into television broadcasting. The station switched its primary affiliation to NBC after the acquisition and was also affiliated with ABC on a secondary basis.

In 1963, the company acquired News-Texan Inc., a publishing company that owned suburban newspapers in the Dallas–Fort Worth metroplex; this subsidiary was later renamed Dallas–Fort Worth Suburban Newspapers Inc.

The company acquired its second television station in 1969 when it purchased KFDM-TV in Beaumont from Beaumont Broadcasting, followed in 1980 by its purchase of WTVC in Chattanooga, Tennessee. Among its purchases in later years, Belo acquired the Corinthian Broadcasting subsidiary of Dun & Bradstreet in December 1983, adding six additional stations, including CBS affiliates KHOU in Houston and KOTV in Tulsa, Oklahoma and ABC affiliate WVEC-TV in Norfolk, Virginia to its portfolio. This forced the sales of KFDM and WTVC to Freedom Communications, and of WISH-TV in Indianapolis and WANE-TV in Fort Wayne, Indiana to LIN Broadcasting, to comply with FCC ownership limits.

On December 8, 1991, A.H. Belo acquired the Dallas Times-Herald for $55 million; the paper ceased operations the next day.

On September 26, 1996, A.H. Belo announced that it would acquire the Providence Journal Company (publishers of The Providence Journal in Providence, Rhode Island) for $1.5 billion. This purchase brought Belo the Providence company's ten television stations including KING-TV in Seattle.

On December 28, 2000, A. H. Belo Corporation was legally renamed to Belo Corp.

On October 1, 2007, Belo announced the separation of its newspaper and television businesses by spinning off its newspaper business to shareholders as A. H. Belo Corporation, officially completed on February 8, 2008. The television business retained the Belo Corporation name (without the "A. H." initials). The spin-off was structured so that the broadcasting company was the legal successor to the prior company.

In September 2010, Belo became the first non-ABC group to sign on with the Live Well Network, adding it to five of their stations (WFAA, KMOV, WCNC-TV, WVEC, & WWL-TV) on November 8, 2010.

On June 13, 2013, Gannett Company announced plans to buy Belo for $1.5 billion and the assumption of debt. Because of ownership conflicts in markets where both Belo and Gannett owned television stations and newspapers, Gannett planned to sell six Belo-owned stations—KMOV in St. Louis, WHAS-TV in Louisville, KMSB in Tucson, KGW in Portland, Oregon, and KTVK and KASW in Phoenix—to Sander Media, LLC, owned by former Belo executive Jack Sander. Gannett would have provided some services to the Sander stations under joint services agreements. Due to concerns about any possible future consolidation of operations of Gannett- and Belo-owned properties in markets where both owned television stations or collusion involving the Gannett and Sander stations in retransmission consent negotiations, anti-media-consolidation groups (such as Free Press) and pay television providers (such as Time Warner Cable and DirecTV) called for the FCC to block the acquisition.

The concerns were especially pronounced in St. Louis, since the merged company would have controlled two of the three news departments run by "Big Four" stations in that city—KMOV, which was to have been sold to Sander, and Gannett-owned KSDK. On December 16, 2013, the United States Department of Justice threatened to block the deal unless Gannett, Belo and Sander completely divested KMOV to a government-approved third-party company that would be barred from entering into any agreements with Gannett, in order to fully preserve competition in advertising sales with KSDK. Justice claimed that Gannett and Sander would be so closely aligned that Gannett would have dominated spot advertising in St. Louis. On December 20, the deal was approved by the FCC. With the completion of the deal on December 23, on the same day Gannett and Sander agreed to sell KMOV, KTVK, and control of KASW for $407.5 million to Meredith Corporation (which owns KPHO-TV in the Phoenix market); Sander served as caretaker owner of those stations during the sale process, and SagamoreHill Broadcasting would take on KASW's license. Meredith's purchase of KMOV was completed on February 28, 2014, and its purchase of KTVK, along with SagamoreHill's purchase of KASW, were completed on June 19. SagamoreHill was then forced to divest KASW to Nexstar Broadcasting Group (now Nexstar Media Group) on January 30, 2015.

On June 29, 2015, Gannett split into two companies, one specializing in print media and named "Gannett," and the other specializing in broadcast and digital media. The latter company, Tegna, retained most of the Belo stations and is the legal successor to the company that previously bore Gannett's name.

== Former stations ==
- Stations are arranged in alphabetical order by state and city of license.
- Two boldface asterisks appearing following a station's call letters (**) indicate a station built and signed on by the Belo Corporation.

Stations owned by the Belo Corporation
Media market	State	Station	Purchased	Sold	Notes
Phoenix	Arizona	KTVK	1999	2013	
Phoenix	Arizona	KASW	2000	2013	
Tucson	Arizona	KMSB-TV	1997	2013	
Tucson	Arizona	KTTU	2002	2013	
Sacramento	California	KXTV	1984	1999	
Honolulu	Hawaii	KHNL	1997	1999	
Boise	Idaho	KTVB	1997	2013	
Twin Falls	Idaho	KTFT-LD	1997	2013	(Note: Satellite of KTVB.)
Fort Wayne	Indiana	WANE-TV	1984	1984	(Note: Divested to a third party to complete Belo's purchase of Dun & Bradstreet subsidiary Corinthian Broadcasting.)
Indianapolis	Indiana	WISH-TV	1984	1984	
Louisville	Kentucky	WHAS-TV	1997	2013	
New Orleans	Louisiana	WWL-TV	1994	2013	
New Orleans	Louisiana	WUPL	2007	2013	
St. Louis	Missouri	KMOV	1997	2013	
Santa Fe–Albuquerque	New Mexico	KASA-TV	1997	1999	
Charlotte	North Carolina	WCNC-TV	1997	2013	
Tulsa	Oklahoma	KOTV	1984	2001	
Portland	Oregon	KGW-TV	1997	2013	
Chattanooga	Tennessee	WTVC	1980	1984	
Austin	Texas	KVUE	1999	2013	
Beaumont–Port Arthur	Texas	KFDM-TV	1969	1984	
Dallas–Fort Worth	Texas	WFAA-TV **	1950	2013	
Dallas–Fort Worth	Texas	KFWD	2006	2012	(Note: Managed by Belo Corporation, previously under ownership of HIC Broadcast, Inc.)
Houston	Texas	KHOU-TV	1984	2013	
San Antonio	Texas	KENS-TV	1997	2013	
San Antonio	Texas	KCWX	2000	2010	(Note: Managed by Belo Corporation, previously under ownership of Corridor Television)
Hampton–Norfolk–Portsmouth	Virginia	WVEC-TV	1984	2013	
Seattle–Tacoma	Washington	KING-TV	1997	2013	
Seattle–Tacoma	Washington	KIRO-TV	1995	1997	
Seattle–Tacoma	Washington	KONG	2000	2013	
Spokane	Washington	KREM-TV	1997	2013	
Spokane	Washington	KSKN	2001	2013	

=== Cable networks ===
- Northwest Cable News (NWCN), 1997–2013
- Texas Cable News (TXCN), 1999–2013
- News 24 Houston—joint venture with Time Warner Cable, 2002–2004
- News 9 San Antonio—joint venture with Time Warner Cable, 2002–2004
- NewsWatch 15—joint venture with Cox Communications
- "24/7 NewsChannel" on KTVB-DT2, 2002–2013
- Local News on Cable (LNC), 1997–2010
