= Four Points Media Group =

Holding company (2007–2012)

Four Points Media Group LLC
- Company type: Private
- Industry: Media
- Predecessor: 7 stations owned by CBS Corp.
- Founded: 2007; 19 years ago
- Defunct: January 1, 2012
- Fate: Acquired by Sinclair
- Successor: Sinclair Broadcast Group
- Key people: Dick Reingold; (President, CEO)
- Services: Broadcast television
- Owner: Cerberus Capital Management

Four Points Media Group LLC was a holding company owned by Cerberus Capital Management, established in 2007 to serve as a buyer for 7 television stations formerly owned by CBS Corporation.

The company took over the day-to-day operations of the stations via local marketing agreements on June 25. The acquisition of the stations was granted FCC approval on November 21, 2007, and closed on January 10, 2008.

KUTV, the CBS affiliate in Salt Lake City, served as the master-control hub facility for Four Points' stations. As such, it served as the "flagship" station of the group. KEYE-TV in Austin, Texas, the other CBS affiliate owned by Four Points, was the only station not controlled by the KUTV hub facility.

On March 20, 2009, Four Points reached an agreement with Nexstar Broadcasting Group to take over operations of the stations through local service agreements (LSAs).

On September 8, 2011, Sinclair Broadcast Group announced its intent to purchase Four Points Media Group from Cerberus Capital Management for $200 million. Sinclair began managing the stations in October 2011 through time brokerage agreements and would supply working capital to the stations in consideration of service fees and performance incentives through the LMAs, prior to closing of the acquisition. The deal was approved by the Federal Communications Commission (FCC) on December 21, and closed on January 1, 2012.

== Former stations ==
- Stations are arranged in alphabetical order by state and city of license.

Stations owned by Four Points Media Group
| Media market | State | Station | Purchased | Sold |
|---|---|---|---|---|
| West Palm Beach | Florida | WTVX | 2008 | 2012 |
| West Palm Beach | Florida | WTCN-CA | 2008 | 2012 |
| West Palm Beach | Florida | WWHB-CA | 2008 | 2012 |
| Providence | Rhode Island | WLWC | 2008 | 2012 |
| Austin | Texas | KEYE-TV | 2008 | 2012 |
| Salt Lake City | Utah | KUTV | 2008 | 2012 |
| Salt Lake City | Utah | KMYU | 2008 | 2012 |
