= TXCN =

Texas Cable News
- Country: United States
- Broadcast area: Texas
- Headquarters: Dallas, Texas

Programming
- Language: English
- Picture format: 480i (SDTV)

Ownership
- Owner: Belo Corporation (1999–2013); Gannett Company (2013–2015)
- Sister channels: WFAA, KVUE, KHOU, KENS, KBMT, KYTX, KIII, KIDY, KXVA, KCEN-TV, KAGS-LD

History
- Launched: January 1, 1999; 27 years ago
- Closed: May 1, 2015; 10 years ago

Texas Cable News (TXCN) was an American regional cable news television channel that was owned by the Gannett Company. The channel operated out of offices in Dallas, Texas, located on Young Street in the city's downtown district.

== Background ==
=== Beginnings ===
The 24-hour channel launched on January 1, 1999, and was founded by its original owner, the Belo Corporation. TXCN combined the news staffs of four television stations in Texas owned by Belo at the time – ABC affiliates WFAA in Dallas and KVUE in Austin (acquired from Gannett shortly after this channel's launch), and CBS affiliates KHOU in Houston and KENS in San Antonio – in addition to The Dallas Morning News (which was co-owned with TXCN and the four television stations under common ownership until 2008) and the company's Washington, D.C. news bureau. During the first few years on the air, most of the cable operators have aired TXCN on channel 38 as advertised by the channel itself. In addition to rolling news, weather, and sports coverage, TXCN had public affairs, sports-talk, and entertainment news programming. In its early years, the Fort Worth Star-Telegram has called TXCN "CNN Headline News with a Texas flavor."

When necessary, TXCN would also cover breaking news events outside of Texas, especially during the September 11, 2001 attacks.

=== The gradual decline ===
On December 4, 2004, Belo announced the layoffs of 45 of the channel's 75 staffers. This resulted in the programming on Texas Cable News being scaled down on January 1, 2005. Belo attributed the failure of Texas Cable News to a lack of distribution on cable providers in Texas' largest television markets. From that time until closure, TXCN aired repackaged content from the aforementioned stations in Dallas, Houston, San Antonio and Austin. All original programming, with the exception of weather segments and occasional original programming, was dropped along with on-air talent, except for weather department staff. By April 2009, Belo had further consolidated and downsized operations of TXCN, and the channel's dedicated production and technical facilities, until then located in a building behind the Dallas Morning News building, were vacated.

In 2008, Belo decided to split its broadcasting and newspaper interests into separate companies. TXCN remained with the broadcasting side, which retained the Belo Corporation name, while the newspapers (including The Dallas Morning News) were spun off to the similarly named A.H. Belo Corporation (since June 29, 2021, it was renamed as DallasNews Corporation). However, the former corporate cousins maintained a news partnership. On June 13, 2013, the Gannett Company announced that it would acquire Belo for $2.2 billion, including TXCN and its sister stations. The deal was granted FCC approval on December 20, and was finalized on December 23.

=== Final days on-air ===
On March 3, 2015, WFAA's website announced that TXCN was shutting down after 16 years. A meeting between the owner, Gannett Company, and various cable outlets have agreed to shut down the statewide news channel. After the shutdown, only Time Warner Cable News (renamed Spectrum News as of September 20, 2016) in Austin, Waco and San Antonio are the only 24-hour local or regional news channels left in the state of Texas (however, in late 2020, Spectrum News 1 was launched for the immediate Dallas/Fort Worth Metroplex). It was slated to go off the air on April 1, 2015, but the cut-off time was extended to May 1, 2015 at 12:01 a.m. in the Central Time Zone, in which the channel quietly ceased operations after the 11:00 p.m. cycle of the repackaged newscasts. Roger Barry, the last remaining TXCN on-air personality, announced that he was retiring earlier that day. This came at a time when the channel's viewership had decreased in the face of increased news consumption on digital and other non-television platforms, along with the nationwide streaming availability of the newscasts live or delayed of the stations contributing content for the network via their websites, effectively making the entire operation superfluous and duplicative. In addition, the network did not broadcast in HD, which was nearly general for television news in the United States by the time of the shut-down announcement.

== Website ==
In addition to the network itself, TXCN maintained a website, which listed headlines and weather reports across the state, sports scores, Texas Lottery results, daily Texas History, programming guide for TXCN's original shows, anchor biographies, and a channel finder. Until April 30, 2015, the webpage remained somewhat active, but many features have gradually shut down since the 2004 staffing cuts, leaving only the news headlines and weather updates from the four aforementioned stations via their websites' RSS feeds, and an outdated channel guide (still listed that DFW was being served by Comcast and Houston being served by Time Warner Cable even though the two clusters switched providers in August 2006). On April 30, 2015, the website was changed to a message explaining that TXCN would be discontinued on May 1, 2015 at 12:01 a.m. in the Central Time Zone. The message also provided a list of all Texas-area Gannett stations—including its purchased London Broadcasting assets (now spun off to TEGNA Media as of June 29, 2015; since March 2026, the company itself is acquired by Nexstar Media Group) and their corresponding websites. As of March 2019, the website redirects to WFAA's website.

== Former programs ==
These shows were originally produced for TXCN prior to 2004.

- The Big Movie Show (hosted by Gary Cogill)
- Chevy Sports Day
- Ford SportsTalk
- High School Football Edge
- Lady Raider Sports (hosted by Marsha Sharpe)
- Lone Star Park Live
- Project Texas
- Red Raider Sports (hosted by Bob Knight)
- State of the Game
- Texas Now
- TXCN Early Connect
- TXCN Firstcast
- TXCN Nightwatch
- TXCN Prime
- Monday Mornings with Mattie
- Family Time with Tracey Johnson

== Return of Texas regional news via Charter Communications ==
Following the closure of TXCN in 2015, Charter Communications began expanding its service footprint across Texas with the acquisition of the former Time Warner Cable, which led to the adoption of the Spectrum brand name. As part of this expansion, the cable company also expanded its Spectrum News service, an internally produced news service that focused on local and regional news where the major network affiliates were increasingly focused on more dramatic or shocking stories with immediate impact.

Spectrum News first expanded in Texas with a presence and bureau in Austin in 2016, and Dallas Ft. Worth in 2020. Both bureaus focus on local and regional stories in a nearly identical manner to the former TXCN, with a reduced focus on original programs.

== TEGNA stations launch Texas News Now ==
TEGNA owned and operated stations across Texas collectively launched a new regional news program in Spring 2025 titled Texas News Now, which is an hour-long news roundup available on TEGNA station smart TV apps and online covering the footprint of TEGNA-owned stations across Texas, recalling TXCN's former newswheel format.
