= Spectrum News (disambiguation) =

Spectrum News is a group of cable news channels owned by Charter Communications.

Spectrum News may also refer to:

- The Transmitter, formerly named Spectrum News, an organization that publishes information about autism
- Spectrum News 1 Austin, a cable news television channel based out of Austin, Texas
- Spectrum News 1 Buffalo, a cable news television channel based out of Buffalo, New York
- Spectrum News 1 Capital Region, a cable news television channel based out of Albany, New York
- Spectrum News 1 Central New York, a cable news television channel based out of Syracuse, New York
- Spectrum News 1 Kansas City, a regional sports network based out of Kansas City, Missouri
- Spectrum News 1 (Massachusetts), a cable news television channel based out of Worcester, Massachusetts
- Spectrum News 1 North Carolina, a cable news television channel based out of North Carolina
- Spectrum News 1 Rochester, a cable news television channel based out of Rochester, New York
- Spectrum News 13, a 24-hour cable news network in Florida, United States
