= YNN =

YNN may refer to:

- Your News Now, the brand for Time Warner Cable's 24-hour cable news television affiliates:
  - YNN Buffalo, serving Buffalo, New York
  - YNN Rochester, serving Rochester, New York
  - YNN Central New York, serving Central New York
  - YNN Capital Region, serving New York's Capital District
  - YNN Austin, serving the Austin, Texas area
