= InfoMás =

- Country: United States
- Broadcast area: Tampa/St. Petersburg/Orlando, Florida
- Headquarters: Orlando, Florida

Programming
- Language(s): Spanish
- Picture format: 1080i (HDTV); 480i (SDTV)

Ownership
- Owner: Bright House Networks (2011-2016); Charter Communications (2016-2017)
- Sister channels: Bay News 9 News 13; Spectrum Sports (Florida)

History
- Launched: July 12, 2011; 14 years ago
- Replaced: Bay News 9 en Español (Tampa Bay); Central Florida News 13 en Español (Central Florida)
- Closed: November 20, 2017; 7 years ago

InfoMás (better known as Spectrum InfoMás as of September 24, 2017) was an American Spanish-language cable news television channel owned by Charter Communications through its acquisition of Bright House Networks in May 2016. The channel provided 24-hour rolling news coverage focused on the Tampa Bay Area and Central Florida. The channel was carried on Charter Spectrum digital channel 900 and in high definition on digital channel 1900.

The network was shut down in November 2017, as the owners said that Hispanic viewers watched the English news coverage of Bay News 9 in Tampa and News 13 in Orlando. Most of the existing InfoMás staff were made redundant.

== History ==
The channel traced its history to the launches of two separate Spanish language news channels owned by the former Bright House Networks. In Fall 2001, then Bay News 9 General Manager Elliott Wiser announced the creation of a local Spanish news channel. Bay News 9 en Español launched in March 2002. It provided news coverage and other news content for the Tampa Bay area's Hispanic community. It was the first local news channel in the United States to provide local news and weather segments in Spanish 24 hours a day. Bright House then launched a Spanish-language spin-off of its Orlando-based news channel Central Florida News 13, Central Florida News 13 en Español, in December 2006.

In July 2011 Bright House Networks merged Bay News 9 and Central Florida News 13's Spanish-language news channels into a single regional news channel called InfoMás, broadcasting reports and political coverage from the Tampa and Orlando areas; plans also included a talk show produced out of News 13's Orlando studios, and Spanish broadcasts of professional baseball and basketball games. The channel maintained reporters based in both Tampa Bay and Central Florida.

== Programming ==
Like its English language counterparts, InfoMás covered local, national and international news stories, weather forecasts, entertainment and health stories, and sports; weather segments on the channel also incorporated weather forecasts for South America, the Caribbean and Mexico.

The channel also produced Revista InfoMás, a half-hour weekday magazine program covering politics, immigration, education and other news subjects that affect the Hispanic and Latin American community in the central third of Florida. In lieu of a Spanish-language regional sports network in either of the two markets that InfoMás served, the channel also carried sporting events including NBA games from the Orlando Magic, and Major League Baseball games from the Tampa Bay Rays and the Miami Marlins; game telecasts feature commentary and analysis in Spanish.

== Notable former on-air staff ==
- Carleth Keys – anchor/managing editor (2002–06)

== See also ==
- Bay News 9 - a similar 24-hour regional cable news channel for the Tampa Bay Area operated by Charter Communications
- News 13 - a similar 24-hour regional cable news channel for the Orlando area operated by Charter Communications
