= Spectrum Sports (Wisconsin) =

- Broadcast area: Milwaukee, Wisconsin & surrounding areas, Northeast Wisconsin
- Network: Spectrum Sports

Ownership
- Owner: Time Warner Cable (2007-2016); Charter Communications (2016-2018)
- Sister channels: Spectrum Sports (Carolinas), Spectrum Sports (Ohio), Spectrum Sports (New York), Spectrum Sports (Kansas City), Spectrum SportsNet (Los Angeles), Spectrum Sports (Texas); Spectrum Sports (Florida); Spectrum SportsNet LA

History
- Launched: February 2007; 19 years ago
- Closed: December 31, 2018; 7 years ago
- Replaced by: Spectrum News 1 Wisconsin
- Former names: Time Warner Sports Milwaukee (February 2007-June 2008), Time Warner Cable Sports 32 (June 2008-January 2013), Time Warner Cable SportsChannel (Jan 2013–Sept 2016)

Links
- Website: Milwaukee; Green Bay

Spectrum Sports is a former regional sports network owned by Charter Communications through its acquisition of Time Warner Cable, including its Milwaukee and Eastern Wisconsin cable franchises, in May 2016. Broadcasting on Channel 32 exclusively on Charter Spectrum systems in the Milwaukee and Green Bay/Fox Cities areas, the channel launched in February 2007. This is not to be confused with WACY, Green Bay's actual broadcast Channel 32, which airs on Spectrum channel 83 on its northeastern Wisconsin systems.

The channel featured a mix of local sports roundtable discussion shows, UW-Milwaukee Panthers sporting events, programs featuring the former sports directors of several local television stations and newspapers, coaches' shows, high school sports, and other minor professional sports within the Milwaukee and Green Bay franchise areas of Spectrum. Until 2013 the network also aired Marquette Golden Eagles sports, including men's college basketball games from ESPN Plus, rebroadcasts of ESPN Marquette games, other Marquette sports, and archived Marquette sports programming; this was discontinued that year due to the new Big East Conference contract with Fox Sports 1 which will see some games sub-licensed to Fox Sports Wisconsin locally, and the athletic department considering taking their coach's shows online-only or discontinuing them altogether. The Horizon League also moved to a mix of airing their games through ESPN+ and Stadium (the latter sometimes simulcast by WVTV's "My 24" subchannel), leaving the network without much college game programming. The network also had rights through Time Warner Cable/Spectrum's 'official cable partner' designation to carry programming produced by and revolving around the Green Bay Packers.

On May 18, 2016, Charter completed its merger with Time Warner Cable, after an earlier attempt by Comcast to merge with Time Warner had failed the year before, placing the network and Time Warner Cable's Milwaukee operations under the control of Charter. As a result, it and the other ex-TWC RSNs rebranded under the umbrella of Spectrum Sports.

== Replacement with Spectrum News 1 Wisconsin ==
The channel was never added to Charter's legacy systems in Wisconsin. This was due to Spectrum launching a statewide 24-hour news channel, Spectrum News 1 Wisconsin; a lack of sports job postings for the effort suggested that the content of Spectrum Sports would be merged into the new effort, with a relocation of the rebranded channel space to Channel 1 statewide. This was confirmed by Spectrum in October 2018, and Spectrum Sports ended autonomous operations before the launch of the new Spectrum News channel on November 27 at 6 a.m., using space in Spectrum's downtown Milwaukee headquarters. Time Warner planned to launch "Time Warner News Wisconsin" in the mid-2000s before deciding not to launch a news channel at the time and focus on a more scalable local sports channel. The network continued with archived content for the next month, going off the air late on December 31, 2018.

== Programming ==
The following shows were broadcast and produced by the network:

- The Roundtable – A roundtable show featuring Spectrum Sports' Sports Director Dennis Krause and state sports journalists. Airs weeknights.
- Dennis Krause Show - A half-hour profile show with Krause interviewing sports coaches and former Wisconsin sports greats.
- Sports32 Weekly – Weekly round-up of high school, college, or professional, premieres Tuesdays.
- Timber Rattlers Field Pass - Program featuring stories, news and profiles involving Appleton's minor league baseball team, the Wisconsin Timber Rattlers.
- The Rob Jeter Show – Official weekly coach's show for Milwaukee men's basketball coach Rob Jeter, with Bill Johnson.
- The Keith Tozer Show – A weekly show involving the XSL indoor soccer league and the Milwaukee Wave, featuring Wave coach Keith Tozer, with Dennis Krause.
- "The Midwest Ballers Show"

The following sporting events were carried by Spectrum Sports (Wisconsin):

- WIAA athletics
- Milwaukee Panthers athletics
- Wisconsin Timber Rattlers baseball
- Milwaukee Admirals hockey
- Green Bay Gamblers hockey
- Milwaukee Wave indoor soccer
- Green Bay Blizzard arena football
- Milwaukee Iron arena football

Other shows that aired on Spectrum Sports (Wisconsin):

- Milwaukee Admirals All-Access
- Milwaukee Iron Coach's Show
- Sidelines
- On the Water Adventures
- Hunter's Exchange
- John Gillespies Waters & Woods
- Midwest Classic Golf with Tom Sutton
- Raceline
