= Centralcasting =

Centralised automation for broadcasting

In terrestrial radio and television broadcasting, centralcasting refers to the use of systems automation by which customised signals for broadcast by multiple individual stations may be created at one central facility.

== Definition ==
Centralcasting is a form of broadcast automation which operates on the presumption that large quantities of content are similar and are handled in a consistent or repetitive manner across multiple stations in a broadcast station group. While each individual station has its own digital on-screen graphic logo, call sign and identity, much of the content on a typical affiliate station consists of a common television network or syndicated programming with a small number of local broadcast programming time blocks employed for television news and sports television coverage, public affairs programming or local television commercials.

Traditionally, many operations at an individual broadcast station were handled manually by broadcast engineering technicians at the local station. Network feeds would arrive by satellite; these would contain time cues to indicate when the station could switch to a prerecorded local station break from a videotape recorder, a local station ID from a character generator or a local program such as a newscast. Syndicated programming would arrive separately, either recorded in advance from satellite for tape delay or transported on prerecorded media. Local advertisements would be stored on tape cartridges ("carts") which would need to be inserted in the correct timeslots manually. A station could not operate unattended, even if it were merely retransmitting a network television programme originated elsewhere.

Broadcast automation relies on computers to store and retrieve video, largely eliminating the use of individual videotapes and allowing switching and retrieval of stored programming, advertising and titles to take place automatically. The server would operate from stored playlists, in which each programme, each commercial advertisement, each live or network feed and each station break had been configured in advance.

=== Central control ===
In some cases, broadcasters have operated groups of multiple stations at the regional or national level from one central facility, removing many tasks which were formerly done locally. These operations normally take one of two forms:

1. A fully centralised operation may have local stations which function as little more than a local news bureau and a transmitter site. The local station sends its news footage to the central hub, which inserts it (along with local advertising and station identifiers) into a national network or syndicated programming feed. All video is stored in one central location. The resulting broadcast video streams are centrally assembled then sent directly to local station transmitters by the central hub.
2. A less-centralised approach involves installing servers at local broadcast station sites which may be controlled either locally or remotely. The central hub would be able to send video to the local station, along with playlist information, and local facilities would then be used to store and rebroadcast programming.

=== Non-broadcast operations ===
Many traffic and operations tasks, such as acquiring programming, selling advertisements, scheduling and keeping records of what was broadcast and billing advertisers take place behind the scenes, yet are also suited to automation and central operation by regional broadcast station groups. If computers handle scheduling of individual broadcasts, advertisements and local identification, a computerised record of what has been broadcast can easily be extracted for use at a central location to bill advertisers for broadcast time. Central operation of non-broadcast business functions removes the need for these tasks to be carried out at each of the multiple local stations.

== Advantages ==
For some broadcasters, centralisation of broadcasting operations has reduced the number of people required to operate a station, with some saving in cost. The removal of the space used by master control can then be co-opted for newsroom or studio expansion. This must be carefully balanced, however, against the cost of the extra communications links required from the local station to the hub; these often are optical fibre, microwave or (occasionally) satellite and can be costly if large amounts of digital video must be carried great distances.

By shifting many of the control tasks to a central hub, centralcasting may also reduce the investment which must be made in equipment for each individual local station in the group for upgrades such as digital television broadcasting as less equipment is required at each local station site.

Centralcasting can also be used as a way to control a station's local operations remotely during off-hours (such as late night, where there may be no one or just a skeleton crew at the local site). This can allow a station to operate on an "auto-pilot" basis during off-hours in which it otherwise may have needed to sign-off.

== Drawbacks ==
An over-reliance on automation (and a reduction in the number of people at the local station) may leave an individual station less able to respond to local breaking news, such as tornadoes or other natural disasters which require local, live and immediate coverage. Individual local stations must also retain enough equipment to handle Emergency Alert System messages, routing them automatically to any remote locations being used to encode the final broadcast signals.

The use of large amounts of centrally assembled programming may also reduce local diversity, turning a station into little more than a semi-satellite of a main broadcaster in another city. In some cases, individual stations in a group were formerly required to maintain nominal main studios in or near their respective communities of license but originated little or nothing from these facilities once most broadcast-related tasks become centralized. Often for smaller networks which maintained these minimum studios, there was no room devoted specifically for studio use, and the 'studio facility' was merely an office suite for the reasons of minimum compliance, hosting a public file and serving merely as a telephone/mail correspondence point, with its transmitter site hosting the EAS rack, along with a television camera to suffice the studio requirements (even if the signal would be merely redirected to another station giving emergency news and information). The Main Studio Rule was repealed by the FCC in 2019, with some station groups closing these small main studios for full remote centralcasting.

Broadcast centralisation can create problems when one station in the group is sold (as the local master control functions which had been centralised must be restored before the local station is a viable stand-alone entity). There also needs to be some means to remain on-air locally if the link to the central hub is lost, lest a single point of failure take down all stations in the regional group.

== Users ==
Individual users of centralcasting facilities include:

- Ion Media began centralcasting in 2013 before Scripps took control of it in 2021, and now its stations are all controlled from its West Palm Beach, Florida broadcast facility, even those in a market with another Scripps station.
- ABC Owned Television Stations uses centralcasting.
- CBS News and Stations uses centralcasting.
- Cox Media Group uses centralcasting.
- Cowles Publishing Company's three Washington stations (which include KNDO and KNDU and their SWX Right Now channels), are operated from a centralcasting facility at flagship station KHQ-TV.
- Equity Media Holdings operated a unique C.A.S.H. (Central Automated Satellite Headend) system which allowed it to program all of its stations nationwide from one central hub in Little Rock, Arkansas. Individual station sites in the system were little more than satellite-fed broadcast translators. This system, once one of the largest examples of central broadcast automation, was shut down as a result of Equity's 2009 chapter 11 bankruptcy.
- Fisher Communications used centralcasting.
- Fox Television Stations centralcasts from Las Vegas, Nevada, though it has no station in the market.
- Hearst Television uses centralcasting.
- Innovate Corp., and its subsidiaries HC2 and DTV America centralcasts the station idents, all made up of a ten-second PowerPoint slide with calls, channel number and city of license in italicized Calibri from its hub, which has an inexplicably-placed default clock wipe in the middle of the sequence using the same production music cut each time. However, these idents are crudely inserted regardless of each network's local insertion opportunity and during programming. Innovate's station group relies mostly on outsourced programming from third parties or the 24-hour feeds of digital multicast television networks for content.
- KQED originates six digital subchannels of programming for sister stations KQEH San Jose and KQET Watsonville-Monterey, California in a tapeless/file-based automated operation.
- Meredith Corporation controlled all of its stations from two hubs. Stations east of the Rockies were operated from WGCL in Atlanta, Georgia, and all of its stations out West were controlled from KPHO in Phoenix, Arizona.
- NBC and Telemundo owned and operated stations began using centralcasting in 2001 with three regional hubs. Currently all NBC and Telemundo O&Os are centralcasted from the Comcast Media Center in Centennial, Colorado. Additionally, NBC's cable channels are centralcast from Englewood Cliffs, New Jersey.
- Newport Television (now defunct) operated New York Digital CentralCasting facilities at WSYR-TV Syracuse to serve former Ackerley stations in Binghamton, Elmira, Rochester and Watertown with additional regional hubs serving Oregon and California stations.
- Nexstar Media Group uses centralcasting from 5 regionalized hubs
- Graham Media Group centralcasts from Jacksonville, Florida.
- Some PBS member stations are using centralcasting facilities on a limited scale as a means to deploy additional digital subchannels and remotely monitor unattended overnight broadcast operations.
- PBS SoCal is locating its technical facilities at the Centralcast location in the Los Angeles Sawtelle district
- Radio-Canada generates individualised French language television feeds for each of multiple Canadian time zones from one facility in Montreal
- Sinclair Broadcast Group uses centralcasting.
- TEGNA centralcasts from Charlotte, North Carolina
- Time Warner Cable operated four 24-hour cable news channels (YNN Central New York, YNN Rochester, YNN Buffalo, and YNN Capital Region) from two hubs, one (for news anchoring) in Albany and the other (for all weather operations) in Syracuse. While the news channels mostly use different anchors for each station, all four stations get their weather forecasts from the same team of meteorologists.
- Tribune Broadcasting used centralcasting.
- WCNY-TV, the PBS station based in Central New York State, hosts Centralcast LLC, which broadcast PBS content to over 20 stations in over 9 states. This represents 40% of PBS content in the USA.
- The majority of PBS Wisconsin's operations for its six full-power and translator television stations originate from the public broadcaster's Madison, Wisconsin facility, with the other stations in the network mainly maintaining only basic engineering and studio operations in their city of license. This arrangement is common for statewide PBS and NPR networks such as Kentucky's KET, Nebraska Public Media, Georgia Public Broadcasting in the state of Georgia, and OETA serving the state of Oklahoma. America's First was Alabama Public Television in 1955.

== Controversy ==
Some groups, such as Sinclair Broadcast Group, have attempted to centralise not only routine operational tasks but also the production of local news. The News Central format, which Sinclair abandoned in 2006, involved inserting small blocks of local content into an otherwise-national newscast, which would then be presented to local viewers as having been generated at the local station.

The resulting product contains largely the same content (and potentially the same journalistic biases) in each market in which it appears, raising objections from proponents of localism and opponents of concentration of media ownership.

The reduction in local broadcast-related jobs as tasks are moved to central locations has also drawn objections from trade unions.

== See also ==
- Automatic transmission system
- Broadcast automation
- Station identification and local insertion
- Video server and playout
- Voice-tracking, an equivalent concept for the radio industry
