= Spectrum Community (Maine) =

- Broadcast area: Maine, New Hampshire

Programming
- Picture format: 480i

Ownership
- Owner: Charter Communications

History
- Launched: Unknown
- Closed: 2017

Links
- Website: twctv.net

Spectrum Community was a regional cable television network owned by Charter Communications through its acquisition of Time Warner Cable in May 2016, with coverage throughout Time Warner Cable systems throughout Maine and Northern New Hampshire. The channel broadcasts local programming and local high school and minor league sports. The channel was previously named Time Warner Cable Community and Time Warner Cable Television (TWC TV) before that.

== Programming ==
Business Insider Guest speakers address topical concerns for area business people.

Maine Street Interview show with community leaders discussing happenings in their town.

Mature Lifestyles Monthly news magazine show focusing on senior citizens.

Pet Haven Line Produced by the Kennebec Valley Humane Society, focusing on the care of animals.

State of the State Weekly discussion about local and national issues concerning the state of Maine.

Strictly Sports Monday night program discussing local and national sports, hosted by WGAN talk show host Mike Violette.

Consumer Matters Advice for the Consumer from the Maine Attorney General's office.

Road to the Blaine House Profiles gubernatorial candidates, similar to C-SPAN's Road to the White House.

Mainly Motorsports Focusing on motorsports in New England.

Wildfire Discussing Maine outdoors issues.

Classic Arts Showcase is seen late nights in addition to infomercials.

== Sports programming ==
In addition to Monday night's Strictly Sports talk show. Spectrum Community airs local high school sports largely from Southern Maine and Aroostook County. The station also produces the Maine Principals' Association's high school basketball tournament from Portland every March. Spectrum Community also acts as an overflow feed for MPBN during the aforementioned high school basketball tournament and for New England Sports Network when the Boston Red Sox and Boston Bruins are playing at the same time. Spectrum Community also produces and airs select home Portland Pirates and Maine Red Claws games. The channel will also air games from Time Warner Cable SportsNet when Maine based teams are playing teams that network usually covers.

== See also ==
- TW3 (Albany, NY)
