= Spectrum Sports =

American regional sports broadcasting network group

- Country: United States
- Broadcast area: California; Kansas; New York

Programming
- Language: English
- Picture format: 480i (SDTV); 1080i (HDTV)

Ownership
- Owner: Charter Communications

History
- Launched: 2003

Links
- Website: www.myspectrumsports.com

Availability

Streaming media
- Live Stream: Live Stream

Spectrum Sports (abbreviated as SPECTSN), also known under the corporate names Spectrum Networks, or Charter Sports Regional Networks, is the collective name for a group of regional sports networks in the United States that are primarily owned and operated by Charter Communications through its acquisition of Time Warner Cable in May 2016. Charter also operates two other channels under the alternative name Spectrum SportsNet. The channels previously were branded as either Time Warner Cable Sports Channel or Time Warner Cable SportsNet.

Each of the networks carry regional broadcasts of sporting events from various professional, collegiate and high school sports teams (with broadcasts typically exclusive to each individual network, although some are shown on more than one Spectrum Sports network within a particular team's designated market area), along with regional and national sports discussion, documentary and analysis programs.

Depending on their individual team rights, some Spectrum Sports outlets maintain overflow feeds available via digital cable channels in their home markets, which may provide alternate programming when not used to carry game broadcasts that the main feed cannot carry due to scheduling conflicts. Spectrum Sports' business operations are based in New York City, New York and Los Angeles, California.

== History ==
Time Warner Cable (TWC) launched its first regional sports network in Kansas City in 1996. The network then known as Metro Sports featured mostly college and high school games. The second of these networks was formed in 1998 as Central Ohio Sport! Television. That network began as a partnership with Insight Communications which Time Warner would later acquire. Other networks would soon follow under various names. It wasn't until Fall 2013 that TWC decided to unify these channels under one brand, Time Warner Cable Sports Channel. All of these channels were rebranded as Spectrum Sports after TWC was acquired by Charter in 2016. At that time, Bright House Sports Network was also rebranded Spectrum Sports Florida as Charter had acquired Bright House Networks in the same deal as TWC. With the exception of the Kansas City network (which is also carried by Comcast), all of these networks have exclusive carriage on Charter Spectrum systems only.

Time Warner Cable has also partnered with major league sports teams to form regional sports networks. The first of these was SportsNet New York in 2006 of which the New York Mets are the majority owners. In 2012, Time Warner Cable SportsNet (currently Spectrum SportsNet) was formed in a partnership with the Los Angeles Lakers. This was followed by the less successful Time Warner SportsNet LA (currently Spectrum SportsNet LA) as joint-venture with the Los Angeles Dodgers.

Since taking over, Charter has shut down most of these networks. In some cases they have been replaced by Spectrum News.

== Networks ==
=== Owned and operated ===
Channel	Region served	Team/conference broadcast rights	Year launched	Notes
Spectrum Sports (Kansas City)	Kansas City metropolitan area, Lincoln, Nebraska	Kansas Jayhawks sports Big 12 Conference sports Missouri Valley Conference sports Summit League sports NAIA sports	1996	Launched as Metro Sports; rebranded as Time Warner Cable SportsChannel in 2013.

=== Partnerships ===
Channel	Owner	Region served	Team/conference broadcast rights	Year launched	Notes
Spectrum SportsNet	Los Angeles Lakers (50%); Charter (50%)	Southern California, Central California, Las Vegas Valley, Hawaii	Los Angeles Lakers (NBA); Los Angeles Sparks (WNBA); Los Angeles Galaxy (MLS) (until 2022); Los Angeles Chargers (NFL) (team-related programming)	2012	
Spectrum SportsNet LA; Spectrum Deportes LA	Guggenheim Baseball Management (50%); Charter (50%)	Greater Los Angeles Area, Palm Springs Area, San Joaquin Valley; Las Vegas Valley, Hawaii	Los Angeles Dodgers (MLB)	2014	Only regional sports network with separate Spanish feed. Network is also available on AT&T TV, U-verse, and DirecTV but currently not available on DISH and other cable systems.
SportsNet New York	New York Mets (65%); Charter (27%); NBC Sports Group (8%)	New York Metropolitan Area; Upstate New York	New York Mets (MLB); New York Jets (NFL) (team related programming)	2006	

=== Former networks ===
Channel	Region served	Team/conference broadcast rights	Year launched	Year shutdown	Notes
Spectrum Sports (Carolinas)	North Carolina, South Carolina		2014	2017	Subfeeds: Charlotte, Raleigh, Columbia.
Spectrum Sports (Florida)	Florida		2004	2017	
Spectrum Sports (Ohio)	Ohio, parts of northern Kentucky, western Pennsylvania	Columbus Crew (MLS); Columbus Clippers (IL); Toledo Mud Hens (IL); Dayton Flyers basketball Miami RedHawks hockey Mid-American Conference college football and basketball Ohio High School Athletic Association sports	1998	2019	Launched as Central Ohio Sport! Television. Rebranded as Time Warner Cable SportsChannel in 2012. Network maintains separate feeds for Cleveland, Akron-Canton and Youngstown, Columbus and Mid-Ohio, Cincinnati and Northern Kentucky, and Dayton.
Spectrum Sports (New York)	Upstate New York	Buffalo Bisons (IL); Rochester Knighthawks (NLL); Rochester Razorsharks (PBL); Rochester Red Wings (IL); Rochester Rhinos (USL); New York Mets (MLB) (via WPIX/New York City); Syracuse Chiefs (IL); Syracuse Crunch (AHL); New York Knicks (NBA) (via MSG Network); Eastern College Athletic Conference hockey Syracuse Orange football, basketball and lacrosse Buffalo Bulls football (home games only); Canisius Golden Griffins hockey and basketball Niagara Purple Eagles hockey and basketball RIT Tigers ice hockey Colgate Raiders sports	2003	2017	Subfeeds: Albany, Buffalo, Rochester, Syracuse,
Spectrum Sports (Texas)	Texas	FC Dallas (MLS); Dallas Sidekicks (MASL); High School Football (UIL)	2010	2017	Subfeeds: Dallas / Waco, Austin / San Antonio.
Spectrum Sports (Wisconsin)	Wisconsin	Milwaukee Panthers sports	2007	2018	
Spectrum Sports (Hawaii)	Hawaii	Hawaii Rainbow Warriors and Rainbow Wahine sports Hawaii High School Athletic Association sports	2011	2026	Launched as Oceanic Sports, closed in May 2026.

== See also ==
- NBC Sports Regional Networks
- Fox Sports Networks
- Spectrum News
- Spectrum (brand)
