= Spectrum Sports (New York) =

Network of regional sports cable television stations

- Country: United States
- Broadcast area: Upstate New York
- Network: Spectrum Sports
- Headquarters: West Seneca, New York

Programming
- Language: American English
- Picture format: 1080i (HDTV); 480i (SDTV)

Ownership
- Owner: Charter Communications
- Sister channels: Spectrum Sports (Ohio), Spectrum Sports (Wisconsin), Spectrum Sports (Kansas City), Spectrum SportsNet (Los Angeles), Spectrum Sports (Texas)

History
- Launched: 2003; 22 years ago
- Replaced: Empire Sports Network, Time Warner Cable SportsChannel
- Closed: October 5, 2017; 8 years ago
- Replaced by: MSG Western New York
- Former names: Time Warner Sports (Syracuse); Time Warner SportsNet (Buffalo and Rochester); Time Warner Cable SportsNet (Buffalo and Rochester)

Links
- Website: Albany/Hudson Valley; Syracuse; Rochester; Buffalo

Spectrum Sports was a network of regional sports cable television stations serving much of the upstate New York area. The stations, which were owned and operated by Charter Communications through its acquisition of Time Warner Cable in May 2016, were available in Rochester, Binghamton, Syracuse and Buffalo. The network broadcast a variety of local college and minor league sports games and was the de facto successor to the Buffalo-based Empire Sports Network. Unlike most regional sports networks, Spectrum Sports was never available on satellite television, nor was it available in areas of upstate that are served by companies other than Charter Spectrum/Time Warner Cable (such as Atlantic Broadband in Cattaraugus County or Zito Media in Cayuga County).

== History ==
The network was formed in 2003 as budget cuts at the now-defunct Empire Sports Network, the area's previous regional sports network, forced severe cutbacks in the network's ability to cover sports outside of Buffalo. As a result, Syracuse University dropped Empire and instead signed a contract with Time Warner to carry their games on a separate channel, which became Time Warner Sports. Time Warner added some other sports events from local college and minor league sports teams to create the channel, which was initially only offered in the Syracuse area. In December 2006, Time Warner Sports expanded southward into the Binghamton market.

Also in December 2006, Time Warner SportsNet (TWSN) was established by Time Warner Cable in Rochester by acquiring rights to teams owned by the Rochester Sports Group: namely the Americans (ice hockey), Knighthawks (indoor lacrosse), Rattlers (outdoor lacrosse) and Raging Rhinos (soccer). Some of those teams had previously aired on other Time Warner channels, such as WRWB (the cable-only WB affiliate on channel 16 which has since has been sold to WHAM-TV) and Time Warner's overflow channel, channel 98. In June 2007, TWSN obtained the rights to televise the games of the Rochester Red Wings baseball team. TWSN also obtained the rights to air the Rochester Razorsharks basketball team, replays of the Rochester Raiders indoor football team, and some collegiate sports. The channel serves the entire Greater Rochester area, including the Finger Lakes region and Genesee County (Batavia).

Time Warner Cable established a Buffalo version of TWSN on November 19, 2007, on channel 13 on Buffalo-area TWC systems, operating out of the former Empire studios on Indian Church Road in West Seneca. The channel replaced former local-interest channel "Time Warner 13." TWSN hired former Empire host Jim Brinson in the spring of 2008; Brinson returned to Western New York after a stint as the morning co-anchor at KOHD in Bend, Oregon and hosts programs as well as handles play-by-play duties.

In March 2009, after parent company Time Warner spun off Time Warner Cable as a separate company, all three stations were correspondingly re-branded to begin with "Time Warner Cable" instead of just "Time Warner". The Buffalo and Rochester stations were rebranded as Time Warner Cable SportsChannel in fall 2012, adopting a logo similar to the newly established Time Warner Cable SportsNet in Los Angeles. Likewise, the channels were rebranded "Spectrum Sports" in September 2016 when Charter Communications purchased Time Warner Cable.

Spectrum Sports ceased operations on October 5, 2017. Locally originated programming mostly ended in June; the network waited until October to cease operations to fulfill its commitment to professional baseball coverage. Existing programming on the network was merged into Spectrum News and migrated to online platforms.

== Programming ==
Spectrum Sports aired a wide variety of local sports programming. To suit local interests, and because of rights issues, some events were carried only on the Buffalo, Rochester and/or Syracuse feeds. Binghamton, Utica, and North Country viewers received the Syracuse (Central New York) feed.

In addition to local sports (listed below), Time Warner Sports was also affiliated with ESPNEWS, which was usually carried during the midday period while that network was provided to regional sports networks for filler programming. Paid programming aired on the channel during the overnight hours.

Most first-choice Big East basketball and football games produced by ESPN Plus aired exclusively on Time Warner Cable SportsChannel in its broadcast territory, including any that involve Syracuse University. Additionally, Spectrum Sports rebroadcast Syracuse University games televised by other ESPN networks. SNY (which is part-owned by Charter) generally only had rights to the same games in the New York City metropolitan area.

=== All stations ===
- New York Mets baseball (simulcast of games on WPIX)
- New York Yankees baseball (simulcast of games on WWOR-TV) (2009–2010)
- ECAC Hockey, especially involving Colgate University, Union College, and Rensselaer Polytechnic Institute, in addition to the conference tournament.
- Rochester Americans hockey (moved to MSG Western New York as part of a deal between MSG and team ownership)
- Rochester Knighthawks indoor lacrosse (most games were carried in Rochester but some were broadcast across the entire system)
- Select Oswego State Lakers games
- Select Syracuse University football, basketball, and lacrosse, plus coach's show
- High school sports, with coverage separated by market.

=== Buffalo only ===
- Bengal Magazine, the Buffalo State College weekly athletics recap program
- Buffalo Bisons baseball
- Canisius College hockey and basketball
- Niagara University hockey and basketball
- Portland Pirates hockey (2008–11)
- University at Buffalo home football games (excluding ESPN family of networks broadcasts) and select feeds from road game broadcasts, men's and women's basketball, baseball (select games carries in other markets)
- The Enforcers, an opinion show hosted by Rob Ray and Ruben Brown

=== Rochester only ===
- Rochester Institute of Technology men's ice hockey and occasionally women's ice hockey
- Rochester Rattlers outdoor lacrosse
- Rochester RazorSharks basketball
- Rochester Red Wings baseball
- Rochester Rhinos soccer

=== Buffalo and Rochester only ===
- New York Knicks basketball (simulcast of games on MSG when the Buffalo Sabres are playing at the same time)
- BullsEye, the University at Buffalo weekly athletics recap program

=== Syracuse only ===
- Colgate University home football games, basketball, hockey, and lacrosse (select games aired in other markets)
- Syracuse Chiefs baseball
- Syracuse Crunch hockey

== See also ==
- Spectrum News, sister network
- TW3, Albany sister station that shared some programming with the station
- MSG Western New York, channel focused on Western New York joint programmed by MSG Networks and Pegula Sports and Entertainment.
