= TW3 =

TW3 or TW-3 may be:

- A postcode district in the TW postal area (Twickenham, England)
- That Was the Week That Was, a British television show
- TW3 (Albany, NY), a cable channel
- The Witcher 3: Wild Hunt, a 2015 role-playing medieval fantasy videogame
- Version 3 of the Tanner Whitehouse method of measuring bone age
