= Killing of Dylan Lyons =

2023 killing of a news reporter in Florida, U.S.

Dylan Lyons
- Born: Dylan Colby Lyons; March 11, 1998; Meadowbrook, Pennsylvania, U.S.
- Died: February 22, 2023 (aged 24); Pine Hills, Florida, U.S.
- Education: University of Central Florida; WCJB
- Occupations: Journalist, news reporter
- Employer: Spectrum News 13

Dylan Colby Lyons (March 11, 1998 – February 22, 2023) was an American television news reporter for Spectrum News 13 in Orlando, Florida who was fatally shot while reporting from the scene of a homicide in a Pine Hills neighborhood.

== Early life and career ==
Lyons was born March 11, 1998, in Meadowbrook, Pennsylvania. A graduate of the University of Central Florida with degrees in journalism and political science, Lyons reported and anchored for the UCF Knightly News. He reported and anchored for WCJB, an ABC affiliate in Gainesville.

== Killing ==
On February 22, 2023, Lyons was part of a news crew reporting from Pine Hills in Orange County on the fatal shooting of Nathacha Augustin that happened earlier in the day. 19-year-old Keith Melvin Moses (born June 11, 2003), the suspect in the prior shooting and an Orlando native, returned to the crime scene and shot Lyons and Spectrum News photographer Jesse Walden, then went to a nearby home and shot Brandi Major and her 9-year-old daughter, T'Yonna Major. Police later arrested Moses, who had been an acquaintance of Augustin. Lyons and T'Yonna Major died, while Brandi Major and Walden were critically injured but survived. Moses had a criminal record dating back to 2018 but was never imprisoned as he was a minor at the time.

In addition to his immediate family, Lyons left behind a fiancé, Casey Lynn. A GoFundMe page was set up by the Orlando community and Dylan's sister Rachel to cover the funeral expenses of Lyons and Major.

The killing of Dylan Lyons was condemned by the Director-General of UNESCO Audrey Azoulay in a press-release published on March 1, 2023. UNESCO’s mandate to “promote the free flow of ideas by word and image” includes the protection of journalists and media workers against any forms of attacks and reprisals related to their duties. The facts and circumstances surrounding this killing are categorized and archived online on UNESCO’s Observatory of Killed Journalists. The Observatory archives publicly accessible information on all the journalists killed in relation to their duties since 1997, where the Director-General has issued a condemnation.

On January 29, 2025, the family of Lyons filed a lawsuit against Spectrum News 13's owner, Charter Communications. The lawsuit alleged that Charter Communications had the responsibility to provide staff with proper safety equipment while working in the field and conduct an appropriate risk assessment before sending the news crew into the area while Moses was still at large. On February 18, the families of Lyons and T'Yonna Major filed a lawsuit against the Orange County Sheriff's Office, accusing the sheriff's office of wrongful death and violating civil rights by not doing enough to apprehend Moses or warn people about him. The lawsuit alleges that Brandi Major had asked a deputy what was going on after the killing of Augustin and that she had been told that the situation was under control before Orange County deputies left the scene of the shooting and that the fact there was a homicide suspect in the area was not disclosed to the residents of the area. The lawsuit also accused the sheriff's office of discrimination by assigning fewer resources to Pine Hills.
