= Meadowbrook, Pennsylvania =

Unincorporated community in Pennsylvania, US

- Unincorporated community
- Location within Pennsylvania Location within the United States
- Coordinates: 40°06′45″N 75°04′42″W
- Country: United States
- State: Pennsylvania
- County: Montgomery
- Township: Abington
- Elevation: 154 ft (47 m)
- Time zone: UTC-5 (Eastern (EST))
  - Summer (DST): UTC-4 (EDT)
- ZIP Code: 19046
- Area codes: 215, 267 and 445
- GNIS feature ID: 1204143

Meadowbrook is an unincorporated community in Montgomery County, Pennsylvania. It is located within Abington Township.

== Administration ==
The community is served by Abington Police, and the majority of Meadowbrook is represented at the township level by Abington Ward 1 Commissioner Tom Hecker. Rydal-Meadowbrook Civic Association serves neighbors in this community by hosting candidate forums and advocating for public safety and property rights of homeowners.

== Transport ==
Meadowbrook Station along SEPTA Regional Rail's West Trenton Line served the village. According to histories maintained by the Old York Road Historical Society, this station was previously called Paul Brook Station in the early days.

== Popular culture ==
Meadowbrook and a sort of street gang named "Meadowbrook Mafia" was cited in an episode ("Just Say No", 2x20) of The Goldbergs, a television series set in the nearby Jenkintown.

== Notable people ==
- Steve Frey, pitcher for five baseball teams over eight major league seasons, including Montreal Expos.
- Dylan Lyons, television news reporter.
- Gregg Murphy, sports radio broadcaster for the Philadelphia Phillies.
- Ala Stanford, pediatric surgeon and founder of the Black Doctors COVID-19 Consortium.
- Christopher R. Cooke, auxiliary bishop for the Catholic Archdiocese of Philadelphia.
