= TW3 (Albany, New York) =

Cable television channel

- Country: United States
- Broadcast area: Capital District of NY State, Saratoga County, South Adirondack region, Mohawk Valley, and most of Berkshire County, MA
- Headquarters: Albany, New York

Programming
- Picture format: 4:3 standard definition

Ownership
- Owner: Time Warner Cable
- Sister channels: Capital News 9, News 8 Austin, NY1, News 10 Now

History
- Launched: October 2002
- Closed: 2008

TW3 was a cable television network owned by Time Warner Cable. It was carried on Time Warner Cable systems in the Capital District of New York and that area's suburbs including Saratoga County, the southern Adirondack region, the Mohawk Valley, and most of Berkshire County, Massachusetts.

TW3 was formed in October 2002 as the improved successor to Time Warner 9, a similar station that was succeeded on the Time Warner lineup by sister station Capital News 9 and taking over the channel 3 position which had been pay-per-view previews. On most of Time Warner's Albany-area systems, TW3 occupied the channel 3 position though there were several exceptions, namely former Adelphia systems or systems where an "actual" channel 3 (WCAX in Burlington, Vermont or WFSB in Hartford, Connecticut) has that channel position. Those systems are:

- Pittsfield, Massachusetts: Channel 11
- Ticonderoga, New York (Port Henry/Crown Point) and Schroon Lake, New York: Channel 14
- North Adams, Massachusetts (ex-Adelphia): Channel 21
- Canajoharie, New York, Queensbury, New York, and Lee, Massachusetts (Lenox/Great Barrington) (all ex-Adelphia): Channel 96

It was never an over the air station, just a program source carried by Time Warner.

== Programming ==
Much of TW3's programming was locally originated. The more notable series produced for the station were as follows:

- A simulcast of WAMC's The Round Table (Weekdays 9 a.m.–noon)
- Saints Alive: A magazine show profiling Siena College athletics, hosted by Capital News 9 sports director Damian Andrew.
- Hoop Games: A magazine show on University at Albany men's and women's basketball, hosted by UAlbany broadcaster and WNYT sports director Rodger Wyland.
- Masterminds: A College Bowl formatted quiz show produced in conjunction with BOCES.
- Tech Valley Report: A local business program focusing on the technology sector, produced in part with the Albany-Colonie Chamber of Commerce.
- In & Around Our Towns: A series of insertials that profile aspects of area towns which also airs as a monthly program.
- Capital Tonight: TW3 airs replays of the week-in-review version of the Capital News 9-produced nightly political program. This arrangement dates back to when the show was a weekly program.

TW3 also served as the Albany-area affiliate of the SUNY-owned New York Network, the Educational-access television programming of which aired mostly during daytime hours though their Regents review specials often end up in primetime.

=== Sports coverage ===
TW3 produces and airs a sizeable slate of local sports coverage including high school athletics (football, basketball, baseball, and lacrosse), UAlbany and Siena athletics, Albany Devils hockey, Union College men's hockey and RPI men's hockey. Regionally and beyond, TW3 was the Albany affiliate for ESPN Plus coverage of Big East football and basketball as well as America East Conference network coverage alongside their UAlbany rights. New Jersey Nets games which are seen on WWOR in New York City air on TW3 as well. It also airs New York Yankees games that do not air on ESPN or are not picked up by WXXA from New York City based channel WWOR-TV.

Outside of the Albany area, some TW3 sports programming is simulcast or rebroadcast on Time Warner Cable Sports.

=== Preemptions ===
The station picks up several preempted programs from local broadcast stations that are unable to air them:

- In 2005 and 2006, CBS' Labor Day coverage of US Open Tennis aired on TW3 when WRGB aired the Jerry Lewis MDA Telethon and the WRGB-controlled WNYA was unavailable due to new syndication debuts on that date.
- Limited WMHT programming (namely the PBS Newshour) airs on TW3 at times when WMHT conducts their yearly auctions.
- A small number of New York Yankees games that usually would air on WXXA (also originating from WWOR) air on TW3 in the cases of the Fox network airing either original programming or preseason NFL football.

== Time Warner 9 ==
The predecessor to TW3, Time Warner 9, was on the air from 1997 (when Time Warner purchased the CVI and Cablevision systems in the market) until 2002. Originally, the channel was primarily a barker channel for the then-new services of digital cable and Road Runner plus a clearinghouse for overflow sports programming, most notably WWOR-produced New York Mets games. After Time Warner purchased the former TCI systems in Schenectady and Amsterdam in 1999, it evolved into a showcase for Time Warner's own programming as well as a home for local sports programming. Time Warner 9 was also the home for New York Yankees games in 1999 and from 2000 until 2002 aired a replay of WRGB's 6:00 p.m. newscast at 6:30 p.m., the success of which was a catalyst for the establishment of its replacement, Capital News 9.
