= Christopher R. Cooke =

American Catholic prelate

His Excellency, The Most Reverend Christopher Randall Cooke
- Auxiliary Bishop of Philadelphia; Titular Bishop of Malliana
- Archdiocese: Philadelphia
- Appointed: December 8, 2023
- Installed: March 7, 2024
- Other post: Titular Bishop of Malliana

Orders
- Ordination: May 20, 2006 by Justin Rigali
- Consecration: March 7, 2024 by Nelson J. Pérez, John J. McIntyre, and Michael Francis Burbidge

Personal details
- Born: November 8, 1973 (age 52) Meadowbrook, Pennsylvania, US
- Education: University of Delaware; St. Charles Borromeo Seminary
- Motto: Invenimus Messiam (We have found the Messiah)

Styles of Christopher Randall Cooke
- Reference style: His Excellency; The Most Reverend
- Spoken style: Your Excellency
- Religious style: Bishop

Christopher Randall Cooke (born November 8, 1973) is an American Catholic prelate who has been serving as an auxiliary bishop for the Archdiocese of Philadelphia in Pennsylvania since 2023.

== Biography ==
=== Early life ===
Christopher Cooke was born on November 8, 1973, in Meadowbrook, Pennsylvania. Cooke received a Bachelor of Science in chemical engineering from the University of Delaware in Newark, Delaware, in 1996. That same year, he started working as a process engineer for Arco Chemical Company. He moved to Air Products and Chemicals, Inc.

By 2000, Cooke had decided to become a priest. He left Air Products to enter St. Charles Borromeo Seminary in Wynnewood, Pennsylvania. He earned Master of Arts and Master of Divinity degrees from St. Charles in 2006.

=== Priesthood ===
On May 20, 2006, Cooke was ordained to the priesthood for the Archdiocese of Philadelphia by Cardinal Justin Rigali at the Cathedral Basilica of Saints Peter and Paul in Philadelphia. The archdiocese assigned Cooke as a parochial vicar at the following parishes in Pennsylvania:

- St. Eleanor in Collegeville (2006 to 2008)
- St. Martin of Tours parish in Philadelphia (2008 to 2012)

Cooke left St. Martin in 2012 to become administrator at St. Francis of Assisi Parish in Norristown, Pennsylvania. The next year, he was named as a faculty member and director of the Spiritual Year program at St. Charles Borromeo Seminary. Cooke was promoted in 2021 to dean of men for the seminary. He also serves on the theology formation team there.

A long-distance runner, Cooke completed the Philadelphia Half Marathon in 2016, 2018, 2019 and 2023. His fastest time was 1:50:09 hours in 2016.

=== Auxiliary Bishop of Philadelphia ===
Pope Francis appointed Cooke as an auxiliary bishop of Philadelphia on December 8, 2023. On March 7, 2024, Cooke was consecrated at the Cathedral Basilica of Saints Peter and Paul by Archbishop Nelson J. Pérez, with Auxiliary Bishop John J. McIntyre and Bishop Michael Burbidge serving as co-consecrators.

Cooke is bilingual in Spanish and English.

== See also ==
- Catholic Church hierarchy
- Catholic Church in the United States
- Historical list of the Catholic bishops of the United States
- List of Catholic bishops of the United States
- Lists of patriarchs, archbishops, and bishops

== Episcopal succession ==
Catholic Church titles
Preceded by –	Auxiliary Bishop of Philadelphia; 2024–present	Succeeded by –
