= Bay News 9 =

Cable news network covering Tampa Bay Florida

Spectrum Bay News 9
- Country: United States
- Broadcast area: Tampa/St. Petersburg, Florida
- Network: Spectrum News
- Headquarters: St. Petersburg, Florida

Programming
- Language: English
- Picture format: 1080i (HDTV) (HD feed downgraded to letterboxed 480i for SDTVs)

Ownership
- Owner: Charter Communications
- Sister channels: Spectrum News 13

History
- Launched: September 24, 1997; 28 years ago
- Replaced: Spectrum Sports Florida (in Tampa)

Links
- Website: www.baynews9.com

Availability

Streaming media
- Spectrum News and Spectrum TV apps: 9 (within Tampa metro); 2201 (nationwide)

Spectrum Bay News 9 (also known as Bay News 9) is a cable news television network located in St. Petersburg, Florida. Owned by Charter Communications, it currently serves the Tampa Bay area including Hillsborough, Pinellas, Manatee, Polk, Pasco, Hernando, and Citrus counties. The station, which is exclusive to Spectrum customers, provides rolling news programming 24 hours a day, with the exception of some special programming, including a weekly political program, Political Connections.

The station was created by Elliott Wiser, who was hired as General Manager by Time Warner Cable in May 1997. At that time, TWC was building a similar news channel in Orlando; that channel now is known as Spectrum News 13. Wiser later created Bay News 9 en Español, Tampa Bay on Demand, and Spectrum Sports.

== History ==
The station began operating on September 24, 1997, and gives weather updates every 10 minutes "on the nines" and more frequently during serious weather conditions.

In 2002, Bay News 9 was the first TV station in the area to provide a VIPIR Doppler weather radar system. In 2007, Bay News 9 became the first station in Florida, and one of only a handful of stations, to provide a Dual-Pole Doppler Radar system. On Monday, January 5, 2009, Bay News 9 launched its upgraded doppler radar system called Klystron 9. This new system is capable of seeing weather features in greater detail than other Doppler radar systems. Klystron 9 combines, for the first time in history, a dual Polarimetry radar, Klystron tube, Pulse compression technology and a 1.25-million watt transmitter. That combination of technology makes Klystron 9 the most powerful television radar in the world. Klystron 9 has the ability to see storms other radars can't see and see deeper into those storms. The Klystron 9's dual-pole technology even tells meteorologists the sizes and shape of raindrops and makes the distinction between rain and ice.

Two original anchors remain with the station: meteorologists Mike Clay and Alan Winfield. Winfield only works during hurricanes after leaving the station full-time in 2006 to join a religious ministry. In December 2008, Jen Holloway left the station to join the parent company, Bright House Networks, as a marketing spokesperson. Weekend morning anchor Erica Riggins replaced her spot.

Bay News 9 was originally seen on channel 9 on all systems, except for Pasco County, where it was seen on channel 6. On August 7, 2013, Bright House Networks moved Bay News 9 to channel 9 in Pasco County, making Bay News 9 available on all of Bright House's cable systems in the Tampa Bay area. The newscasts (with the exception of Your Morning News) are recorded for repeat broadcasts with breaking news and weather forecasts inserted almost hourly.

Veronica Cintron was the 5pm-5am solo anchor for ten years straight. Veronica worked a 12-hour shift.

== News operation ==
Bay News 9 maintains content partnerships with several local radio stations as well as various Bay Area newspapers including the Tampa Bay Business Journal, the Citrus County Chronicle, and The Bradenton Herald. The channel also operates news bureaus in Tampa, Bradenton, New Port Richey and Spring Hill; as well as at the offices of the Citrus County Chronicle in Crystal River and The Ledger in Lakeland. The channel also produces feature reports for Orlando-based sister channel News 13 (Bright House began carrying that channel in the Tampa market on digital channel 1213 in December 2010, with Bay News 9 conversely being added to the provider's Central Florida systems on digital channel 1209).

In 1999, Bay News 9 introduced "Health Team 9," a team of practicing doctors (Steven Seltzer, Robert DiMasi, Jacentha Buggs and Linda McClintock) and a licensed psychologist (Steve O'Brien) employed by the channel to serve as experts reporting on a variety of medical issues. The channel ran a regular medical news segment during the morning newscast called "Health Team 9 Health Watch", as well as a segment during the primetime newscast called "Health Team 9 Medical Beat" (which was conducted by the anchor of that night's broadcast). In June 2011, the "Medical Beat" segment was replaced with "Priority Health," in which Dr. Randy Shuck answers health questions sent in by viewers via email; the "Health Watch" segment was also replaced with "Health Headlines," focusing on the day's medical news headlines. Dr. Steve O'Brien remains with Bay News 9 as its mental health expert.

=== Programming ===
The channel operates on a news "wheel" format, offering blocks of news segments, weather forecasts and feature reports in regular intervals; regular weather segments are broadcast in 10-minute intervals "on the nines," with more frequent updates during severe weather events and wall-to-wall coverage whenever hurricanes or tropical storms affect the channel's service area. Its programming is presented live, although a digital video "jukebox" is used to recycle segments (except for those aired during Your Morning News block) for broadcast at other times and to provide loops of newscasts originally broadcast live in certain timeslots (particularly during the overnight hours). Producers update the wheel throughout the day, inserting new material as stories are filed and updated information becomes available; coverage of breaking news events are also inserted as warranted.

In March 2008, Bay News 9 revamped its news cycle, eliminating the "Beyond the Bay" segment at 42 minutes past the hour and replacing it with the Extra segment that aired at 23 minutes past the hour, which was in turn replaced by local news segments. In recent years, traffic segments on weekends have also been eliminated to allow for additional local news coverage. The format returns to the "original" news cycle, with "Extra" segments appearing at 23 and 53 minutes past the hour during the primetime and overnight newscasts. Bay News 9 also is an affiliate of the national and international video news service CNN Newsource.

In addition, Bay News 9 produces the half-hour political discussion program Political Connections (airing Sundays at 11:00 a.m., with an encore at 8:00 p.m.); the program, which is currently hosted by weekday afternoon anchor Al Ruechel debuted in 2005 as part of a partnership between Bay News 9 and the Tampa Bay Times.

Upon the channel's launch, Bay News 9 began producing the nightly half-hour sports highlight program Toyota Sports Connection (it originally aired at 10:30 p.m., before moving to 11:00 p.m. in 2001), which focused mainly on local sports as well as major national sports headlines. It was originally hosted by former Tampa Bay Buccaneer defensive lineman David Logan until his death in 1999, with Rock Riley assuming hosting duties thereafter (the channel has since begun awarding a scholarship to high school athletes named in Logan's honor, The David Logan Scholarship). The program was moved to Bright House Sports Network (now known as Spectrum Sports) in 2010, retaining its 11:00 p.m. timeslot (the regional sports network repeats the program throughout the following day after the initial broadcast).

=== Community service ===
Bay News 9 maintains a program, "Project Weather," which tours hurricane expos and schools in Tampa Bay area communities providing weather safety information to area students. They do SKYPE sessions with local schools called Weather Wednesdays, where students can SKYPE with a meteorologist. The channel distributes science kits to all 6th grade public school teachers in the channel's seven-county viewing area and "Project Weather Activity Books" for preschool and elementary school-aged children at community events. The channel also has an interactive exhibit called "Bay News 9 Rain or Shine" at the Glazer Children's Museum in Tampa, a news and weather exhibit at the Explorations V Children's Museum in Lakeland, a news and weather exhibit at Great Explorations Children's Museum in St. Petersburg, and an exhibit at the Clearwater Marine Aquarium in Clearwater.

== Affiliated channels ==
=== Bay News 9 HD ===
Bay News 9 HD is a high definition simulcast feed of Bay News 9 that broadcasts in the 1080i resolution format. The HD feed is carried on Charter Spectrum digital channels 1009 and 1209; it was launched in the spring of 2006, which resulted in the debut of an extensive graphical overhaul to Bay News 9. Newscasts airing on the feed were not originally produced in HD, airing instead in the 480i format (with stylized pillarboxing) and upconverted to 1080i. On October 20, 2011, Bay News 9 and sister network InfoMás began broadcasting their news programming in high definition, with programming being upgraded to the 16:9 aspect ratio and the introduction of a revised graphics package.

=== InfoMás ===
InfoMás was a Spanish language regional news channel operated through a partnership between Bay News 9 and Orlando-based sister network News 13. The channel was the first 24-hour Spanish language regional news channel in the United States; in addition to providing normal rolling news coverage, the channel also carried exclusive stories tailored to Tampa's Hispanic and Latin American population. Originally carried on digital channel 139, Bay News 9 en Español was later moved to Spectrum digital channel 900. In 2010, the channel began Spanish language game telecasts from the Tampa Bay Rays and Miami Marlins Major League Baseball, and Orlando Magic NBA franchises. The service originated as a separate 24-hour Spanish news channel focused solely on the Tampa Bay area called "Bay News 9 en Español,". Created by Elliott Wiser, the channel launched in March 2002, becoming the country’s first local news channel in Spanish. On March 11, 2011, Bright House Networks announced that it would merge Bay News 9 and Central Florida News 13's respective Spanish-language news channels into a single regional channel, InfoMás. The regional network was launched on July 12, 2011.However, soon after Charter assumed control of the company, InfoMás was discontinued on November 20, 2017, due to most of the Hispanic population in the area watching Bay News 9's English coverage.

=== Spectrum Travel Weather Now ===
Spectrum Travel Weather Now was a 24-hour weather service, which broadcasts on Bright House digital channel 109 and on analog channel 2 (WCLF is digital-only). The channel was launched in 1999 as Bay News 9 Weather Now, and originally provided local forecasts 24 hours a day. In 2004, the channel was relaunched as Bay News 9 Travel Weather Now, reformatted as a 24-hour weather network geared primarily towards business travelers. In October 2009, Bright House Networks revised the channel's name to Bright House Networks Travel Weather Now, with on-air advertisements acknowledging that is content is provided by Bay News 9. After Bright House Networks became Charter Spectrum, Travel Weather Now has been replaced by TV Guide in the bottom screen and a simulcast of Bay News 9 on top.

=== Tampa Bay on Demand/Bay News 9 on Demand ===
Tampa Bay on Demand is a video on demand service which offers local entertainment programming, and is carried on Charter Spectrum digital channel 340. It features segments conducted by Bay News 9 reporter Virginia Johnson, which focuses on people and places within the Tampa Bay entertainment scene, as well as cooking segments (hosted by Roy DeJesus), restaurant and wine reviews, celebrity interviews, and holiday features. The wine review program, Vino Vino, hosted by Elliott Wiser, was nominated for a Cable FAX Award (an awards ceremony presented by industry trade publication Cable FAX) for "Best Video on Demand Program" in August 2012.

Bay News 9 also operates a news-focused VOD service Bay News 9 on Demand, which features long-form news content such as press conferences.

== In popular culture ==
=== Film ===
The 2011 film Dolphin Tale and its 2014 sequel Dolphin Tale 2 featured scenes filmed at Bay News 9's St. Petersburg studio facility. Bay News 9 previously used to operate a webcam in which visitors to the channel's website could watch Winter, the real-life dolphin whose rescue inspired the first film, from her home at the Clearwater Marine Aquarium until her death in 2021.

== See also ==
- News 13 - a similar 24-hour regional cable news channel for the Orlando area operated by Charter Communications
