= Spectrum News 1 North Carolina =

- Country: United States
- Broadcast area: North Carolina
- Network: Spectrum News
- Headquarters: Raleigh, North Carolina

Programming
- Language: English
- Picture format: 1080i (HDTV/widescreen)

Ownership
- Owner: Charter Communications
- Sister channels: NY1; Spectrum News Austin; Spectrum News 1 Buffalo; Spectrum News Central New York; Spectrum News Capital Region; Spectrum News Rochester

History
- Launched: March 22, 2002; 24 years ago
- Former names: News 14 Carolina (2002–2013); Time Warner Cable News (2013-2016); Spectrum News North Carolina (2016-2020)

Links
- Website: spectrumlocalnews.com/nc/charlotte (Charlotte) spectrumlocalnews.com/nc/triangle-sandhills (Central North Carolina) spectrumlocalnews.com/nc/triad (Triad) spectrumlocalnews.com/nc/coastal (Coastal)

Spectrum News 1 North Carolina is an American cable news television channel owned by Charter Communications, as an affiliate of its Spectrum News slate of regional news channels. The channel broadcasts rolling newscasts 24-hours a day, seven days a week, focused primarily on the state of North Carolina, with the exception of some special programming, including weekly in-depth program In Focus, a weeknight regional version of Capital Tonight and the nightly sportscast Sports Night. The channel's headquarters and main studio is located on Atlantic Avenue in Raleigh, just outside downtown. Additional bureaus are located on Morehead Street in downtown Charlotte; at the Centreport office park in Greensboro; on Scientific Park Drive in Wilmington; and in the Croatan National Forest in Newport.

Spectrum News 1 North Carolina maintains five separate feeds for the Charlotte, Research Triangle (Raleigh/Durham/Chapel Hill), Piedmont Triad (Greensboro/Winston-Salem/High Point), Wilmington, and Western North Carolina/Mountain areas; each of the feeds primarily carry local news content for their respective region, however some locally produced programs of statewide interest are shared among SN North Carolina's feeds.

The channel has four rolling-news blocks: Your Morning News from 5am to 10am, Your Midday News from 10am to 5pm, Your Evening News from 5pm to midnight, and Your Overnight News from midnight to 5am.

== History ==
Prior to the launch of the channel, then-CBS affiliate WRAL-TV (channel 5; currently an NBC affiliate) of Raleigh, launched the WRAL NewsChannel, a local news channel that was launched in July 2001 on Time Warner Cable's digital tier (the channel was also transmitted at the time over WRAL's second digital subchannel, now affiliated by Cozi TV).

Time Warner Cable planned to debut its own North Carolina-focused 24-hour local news channel simultaneously in Raleigh, Durham, Fayetteville and Goldsboro in December 2001, which would have given the channel an estimated reach of 425,000 subscribers. After the September 11 attacks in 2001, Alan Mason, the channel's general manager, said the debut would be delayed until February or March 2002. The reason for the change in launch date was because the channel's employees needed training that would have taken place at the new studio facility of sister network NY1 in New York City, however NY1 was concentrating on providing coverage of the attacks and had not yet moved into its new studios. The channel finally made its debut on March 22, 2002, as News 14 Carolina. Reporters used digital cameras instead of videotape, downloading their stories to the newsroom over the computer. Sets, however, more so resembled those used by broadcast television stations.

Time Warner Cable made plans to launch the channel in Charlotte and eight surrounding counties in June. A two-story addition to the Time Warner building on East Morehead Street housed "the nation's most technically advanced newsroom," with digital video that reporters could edit at their desks, and robotic cameras for recording of live and pre-recorded news segments in-studio. In addition, News 14 also operated bureaus in Gastonia and Salisbury. After nine months of preparation, the Charlotte feed of the channel began broadcasting on June 14, under the direction of news director Jim Newman.

Logo as News 14 Carolina used from 2002 to 2013.

Jack Stanley, president of Time Warner's Greensboro division, said that if the Charlotte and Raleigh operations performed well, a Greensboro feed of the channel was likely to launch. This was even though ABC affiliate WXLV-TV (channel 45) had recently shut down its news operation, due to low ratings for its newscasts after it failed to compete with the three established stations in that market (WFMY-TV (channel 2), WGHP (channel 8) and WXII-TV (channel 12)).

On February 26, 2004, members of TheWolfWeb exploited the fact that the channel's system for reporting school, business or church closures during inclement weather were aired without review. Numerous listings ranging from All Your Base Are Belong To Us to several lewd or obscene "businesses" were listed and shown several times during the channel's winter weather coverage. The incident garnered attention from online, print, and broadcast media across the United States, eventually forcing many television stations, including News 14 to establish or increase closing/delay verification and vetting systems to prevent a repeat of the incident.

In June 2004, the website for News 14's Charlotte feed won an Edward R. Murrow Award for "best large-market website" among local television stations. In August 2004, Belo Corporation (then-owners of Charlotte NBC affiliate WCNC-TV (channel 36)) ended its newsgathering partnership with News 14; this forced Time Warner Cable to cut costs by moving administrative, production and master control jobs from the Charlotte feed to Raleigh, and closing the Salisbury and Gastonia bureaus, resulting in the loss of about 50 jobs.

In 2005, News 14 Carolina obtained the local cable television rights to broadcast games from the Charlotte Bobcats NBA franchise. News 14's Bobcats broadcasts were simulcast on Tri-County 14, the local origination channel of Comporium Communications, the main cable provider for the South Carolina side of the Charlotte market; News 14 lost the Bobcats television rights in 2008. On September 25, 2006, the channel launched a feed for the Piedmont Triad region; this was later followed by the launch of a Wilmington area feed on August 18, 2008.

On February 2, 2011, Time Warner Cable and the Sinclair Broadcast Group reached a new carriage contract to resume carriage of WXLV and sister station WMYV (channel 48), resolving a retransmission consent dispute between the two parties. The contract also included a clause to enter into a news share agreement in which News 14 Carolina would begin producing newscasts for WXLV (which had not aired local newscasts since 2004, when it briefly revived its news department as part of Sinclair's News Central local/national hybrid operation). The three weekdaily newscasts, originally branded as News 14 Carolina on ABC 45 (now Spectrum News on ABC 45) and airing for a half-hour at 6:30 a.m., 6:00 and 11:00 p.m., debuted on January 2, 2012. The morning and evening newscasts are produced out of the channel's Greensboro bureau; the launch of the programs also required expansions to News 14's staff.

On December 16, 2013, the channel rebranded as Time Warner Cable News North Carolina as part of a branding standardization across the provider's news channels that included the introduction of a new graphics and music package. All of the channel's subfeeds around the state were accordingly rebranded as Time Warner Cable News (Raleigh/Charlotte/Triad/Coastal). Prior to the rebrand, the channel was one of only two regional news channels owned by Time Warner Cable (alongside New York City sister network NY1) that did not adopt the "YNN" brand (for "Your News Now"), which was adopted by its other news channels between 2009 and 2011 (including Buffalo, New York sister network Time Warner Cable News Buffalo, which was the first to use the brand when it launched in March 2009 as YNN Buffalo). On May 18, 2016, Time Warner Cable was purchased by Charter Communications; the channel was re-branded Spectrum News North Carolina in March 2017. In May 2017, the channel was added to Charter systems in Lillington (on channel 11) and in Carolina Beach and Topsail/Surf City (on channel 5). In January 2021, Spectrum added a Mountain Region feed based in Asheville directed to Western North Carolina serving the area from Asheville to Boone.

In 2017, the channel received a major on-air design update, flattening the brand, and modernizing the appearance of the channel.

In 2020, the channel was re-branded again to Spectrum News 1 North Carolina.
