= Spectrum News =

Group of cable news channels owned by Charter Communications

- Country: United States
- Broadcast area: New York City; Upstate New York; North Carolina; Central Texas; Wisconsin; Greater Los Angeles; Central Florida; Tampa, Florida; Ohio
- Stations: SN Columbus: Columbus, Ohio; SN Austin: Austin, Texas; SN Buffalo: Buffalo, New York; SN Capital Region: Albany, New York; SN Central New York: Syracuse, New York; Spectrum News: NY1: New York City, New York; SN North Carolina: Raleigh, North Carolina; SN Rochester: Rochester, New York; Spectrum News 13: Orlando, Florida; Spectrum Bay News 9: Tampa, Florida; Spectrum News 1 Southern California: El Segundo, California; Spectrum News 1 Wisconsin: Milwaukee, Wisconsin; Spectrum News 1 Kentucky: Louisville, Kentucky

Programming
- Language: English
- Picture format: 480i (SDTV); 1080i (HDTV) (varies, The Capital Region channel is not yet available in HD; Central New York feed is transmitted in 720p HD)

Ownership
- Owner: Charter Communications
- Sister channels: NY1; Spectrum Sports

History
- Launched: September 8, 1992 (Spectrum News NY1)
- Replaced: Spectrum Sports (In some Areas)
- Former names: RNews (Spectrum News Rochester); Capital News 9 (Spectrum News Capital Region); News 10 Now (Spectrum News Central New York); News 8 Austin (Spectrum News Austin); News 14 Carolina (Spectrum News North Carolina); YNN (City/Region Name) (All Spectrum News channels outside of North Carolina)

Links
- Website: spectrumnews1.com/splash

Spectrum News (formerly Time Warner Cable News) is the brand for a slate of cable news television channels that are owned by Charter Communications through its acquisition of Time Warner Cable in May 2016. Each of the 17 regional channels primarily focus on local news, weather and sports coverage in their given areas, in addition to national and international news stories. With the exception of NY1, Spectrum News NECN, Spectrum News Southern California, and the Spectrum News channel for Dallas-Fort Worth (which was formerly over-the-air and on competing cable companies via KAZD), all of the channels are available only via Charter-owned pay television in their respective markets, not appearing on Verizon FiOS, AT&T U-verse, DirecTV or Dish Network.

In July 2022, Charter added all Spectrum News networks, including NY1, Bay News 9 and News 13, to their Spectrum TV mobile and smart TV apps within the 2200s tier of channels, allowing nationwide access to their full suite of networks for Spectrum subscribers.

== Background ==
Time Warner Cable (TWC; at the time, a subsidiary of media conglomerate Time Warner) launched its first regional cable news channel on September 8, 1992, with the rollout of the New York City–based NY1. The provider later acquired GRC9News in Rochester, New York, in 1995 (the result of Time Warner Cable assuming franchise rights in the area, and subsequently renamed R News), and launched two more channels in Florida in 1997, Bay News 9 in Tampa and Central Florida News 13 in Orlando (which were both spun off to Bright House Networks in 2001). These were followed by the launches of News 8 Austin in 1999, News 14 Carolina and News 24 Houston in 2002 and News 9 San Antonio in 2003 (the latter two channels would shut down in 2004), Capital News 9 in 2002, and finally News 10 Now in 2003. A Milwaukee channel was at one point in the planning stages, but a local sports channel was launched instead. For almost all of the channels (excepting NY1 and R News), graphic designer John Christopher Burns (previously employed by then-sister company Turner Broadcasting in the 1980s) was responsible for the creation of the logo and overall looks for every channel, beginning with Bay News 9 in 1997.

Logo as Your News Now used from 2009 to 2013.

In August 2009, TWC launched YNN Buffalo on its Buffalo, New York-area systems; the "YNN" brand (which stood for "Your News Now") was later adopted that August by R News. On February 12, 2010, Time Warner Cable announced plans to have the remainder of its New York–based news channels – with the exception of NY1 – adopt the "YNN" brand that March. In March 2010, Time Warner Cable announced plans to expand the brand to News 8 Austin and News 14 Carolina. News 8 gradually made the transition first, beginning with the adoption of the "YNN Austin" brand on its Facebook and Twitter accounts. The branding change was implemented on that channel on January 10, 2011; however, News 14 would ultimately retain its name for another two years.

On March 14, 2013, Time Warner Cable announced plans to rebrand NY1, News 14 Carolina and the YNN networks under the uniform brand Time Warner Cable News by the end of the year, along with the adoption of new on-air logos and a standardized graphics and music package for each of the channels. The reasoning for the name change was due to the perception by the company that Time Warner Cable subscribers did not know that the provider owns its regional news channels and are largely exclusive to its systems (NY1 is an exception, as it is also carried by the other major cable provider in the New York City market, Cablevision).

On November 20, after objections from Time Warner Cable subscribers over the planned rebranding, the provider announced that it would append the "Time Warner Cable News" brand to the beginning of the NY1 name, while "NY1" would continue to be used on-air as a primary brand. The revised branding as well as the new graphics and music package went into effect on all of TWC's regional news channels on December 16, 2013 (NY1 utilized a modified version of the logo used by the channel since 2001, amended alongside the "Time Warner Cable News" logo).

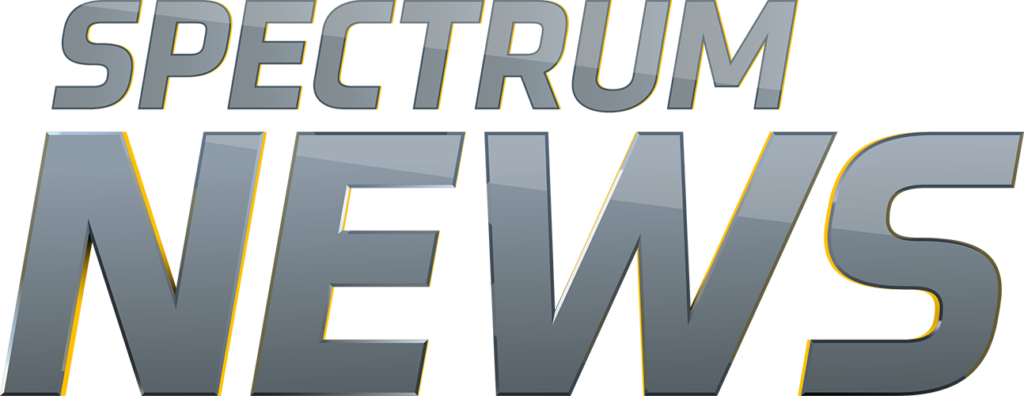
Spectrum News logo used from September 20, 2016 to October 13, 2017.

With the acquisition of TWC by Charter Communications in 2016, the "Time Warner Cable News" branding was dropped from all networks in favor of "Spectrum News", after Charter's primary consumer brand, on September 20, 2016 (with NY1 again incorporating the "Spectrum News" brand into its name while continuing to primarily brand as NY1). Similarly, TWC's various regional sports networks were rebranded under the umbrella of "Spectrum Sports" under a transition period, when they were wound down and those operations merged into new Spectrum News operations.

== Programming ==
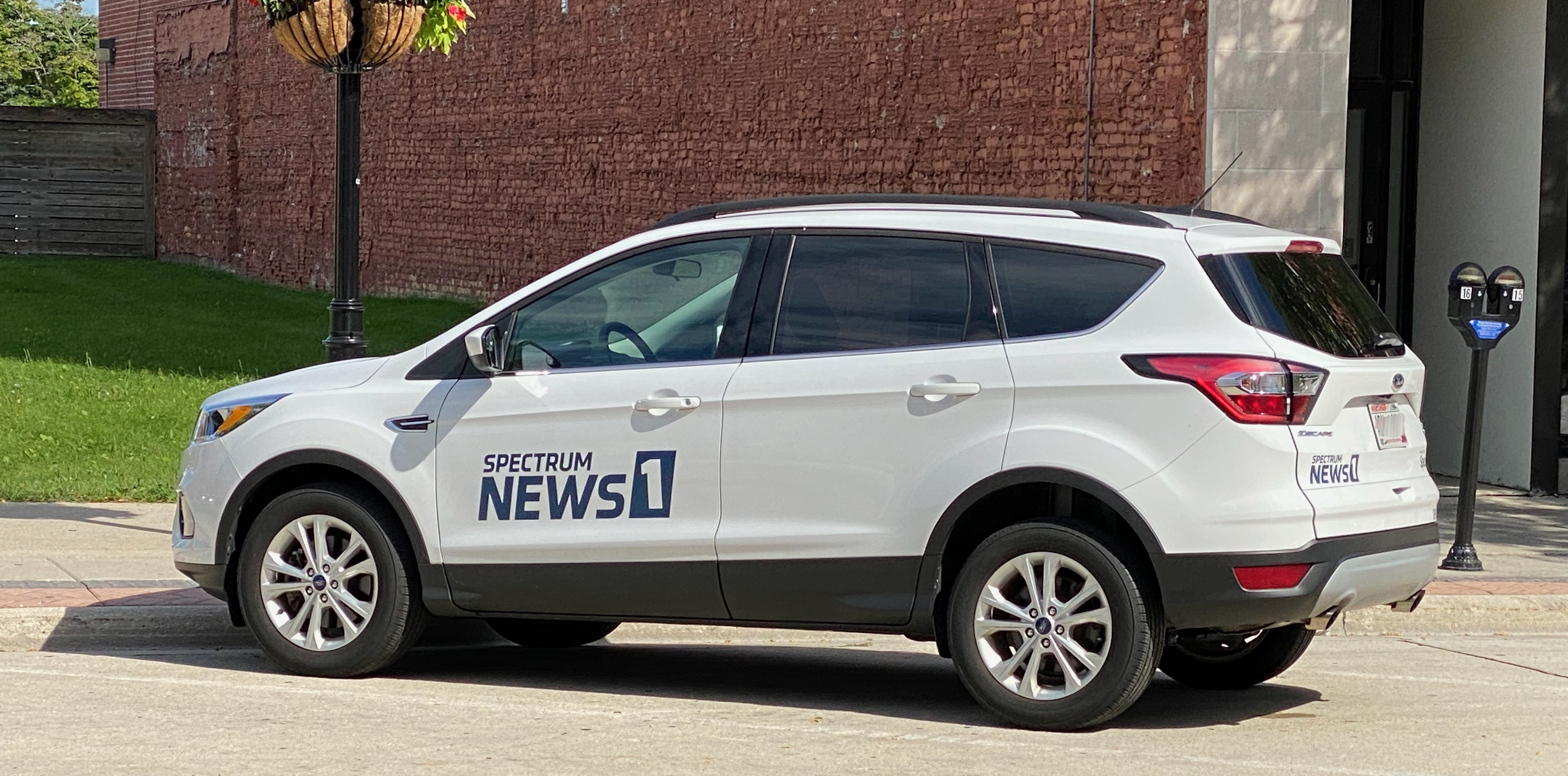
A video journalist's news car for Spectrum News 1 Wisconsin. The reporter was in Sheboygan reporting a human interest piece on the Above & Beyond Children's Museum.

Each of the Spectrum News channels utilize an hour-long news "wheel" format and carry newscasts at least 20 hours a day. Weather reports are broadcast every 10 minutes at all times ending in "1" (for example, 7:01 a.m. or 5:31 p.m.); a brief 90-second-long roundup of the hour's major local headlines (titled “Spectrum News in :90”) airs at the top and bottom of each hour. Each channel also carries live traffic reports based out of their local newsrooms and each maintains its own local assignment desk, on-air staff (anchors, reporters/videojournalists/meteorologists and sports staff), producers and news management.

Spectrum News operates on a model of not carrying news about violent crimes, common auto accidents and fires (known in the industry as 'if it bleeds, it leads' journalism), unless a story involving one is so large and affecting, that coverage is effectively required to remain competitive. In Los Angeles specifically, it does not carry coverage of live freeway car chases, a common feature of the broadcast news operations in Los Angeles. Spectrum News channels also go off the wheel occasionally for live continuous breaking news coverage, such as press conferences for news and sports events, along with live segments or continuous coverage past scheduled live hours for severe weather coverage; some channels also host political debates for local and state candidates. National news events such as the State of the Union, presidential news conferences, and other events considered to be of significant interest are also covered live, depending on the local Spectrum News division's editorial judgement, or may be hubbed to the network's New York headquarters or Washington bureau, as was done with overall coverage of the 2021 storming of the United States Capitol.

Franchise news segments are also syndicated to some of the Spectrum News channels (these include Cooking at Home, a daily cooking segment hosted by Dan Eaton; The Getaway Guy, a travel segment hosted by Mike O'Brian, who also provides traffic reports for Spectrum News' channels in Upstate New York; From the Floor, a weekday financial news segment from the New York Stock Exchange; and Tech Talk, a technology news segment hosted by Adam Balkin).

In addition to sharing weather (and in some cases, sports) content, Spectrum News' four regional news channels in upstate New York – Spectrum News Buffalo, Spectrum News Rochester, Spectrum News Central New York and Spectrum News Capital Region – share content with New York City sister channel NY1, which operates separately from the other Spectrum News channels in the state. The four channels also simulcast the political program Capital Tonight, which is hosted by former Susan Arbetter, formerly of WCNY-FM's "The Capital Pressroom" and is produced out of Spectrum News Capital Region's studios in Albany, at 7:00 p.m. Eastern Time. The network also maintains a bureau in Washington, D.C. for national political news.

Charter also operated Spectrum Sports channels in the same markets as well as many others. In fall 2017, markets that had both Spectrum News and Spectrum Sports stations were consolidated, with Spectrum News stations taking on sports programming and the Spectrum Sports outlets being eliminated.

== Channels ==
=== Spectrum News 1 Austin ===
Spectrum News 1 Austin serves portions of central and south-central Texas. Headquartered in the state capital of Austin, it was launched on September 13, 1999, as News 8 Austin. On January 10, 2011, the channel was renamed as YNN Austin, becoming the last of Time Warner Cable's news channels to adopt the "YNN" brand. The channel was renamed Time Warner Cable News Austin on December 16, 2013. It then changed its name to Spectrum News Austin on September 20, 2016, and again to Spectrum News 1 Austin in 2020.

The station is available on Spectrum channels 1, 8, and 200 in the Austin, Waco, and Killeen/Temple metropolitan areas.

=== Spectrum News 1 Buffalo ===
Spectrum News 1 Buffalo serves the Buffalo region of upstate New York. The channel launched at 7:00 p.m. Eastern Time on March 25, 2009, as YNN Buffalo, becoming the first news channel owned by TWC to use the "YNN" ("Your News Now") brand. The channel is available in almost all of western New York except for portions of Cattaraugus County that are served by Atlantic Broadband. The channel adopted the name Time Warner Cable News Buffalo, on December 16, 2013. It then changed its name to Spectrum News Buffalo on September 20, 2016, and again to Spectrum News 1 Buffalo in 2021.

=== Spectrum News 1 Capital Region/Hudson Valley ===
Spectrum News 1 Capital Region primarily serves the Capital District region of upstate New York, and maintains a subfeed for the Hudson Valley region. The channel launched on October 11, 2002, as Capital News 9 (launching nearly a year behind schedule due to various infrastructure and staffing delays). In August 2006, Capital News 9 expanded its reach to systems within eastern New York that Time Warner Cable had recently acquired from Adelphia Communications. In March 2010, as part of a rebranding of Time Warner Cable's regional news channels statewide, Capital News 9 adopted the "YNN" brand, rebranding as YNN Capital Region. The channel rebranded as Time Warner Cable News Capital Region on December 16, 2013; its subfeed, YNN Hudson Valley, rebranded accordingly as Time Warner Cable News Hudson Valley. It again rebranded as Spectrum News Capital Region/Hudson Valley on September 20, 2016, and to Spectrum News 1 Capital Region/Hudson Valley in 2021.

=== Spectrum News Central New York/Southern Tier/North Country ===
Spectrum News Central New York serves the central portions of upstate New York. Headquartered in Syracuse, it also operates subfeeds for the Southern Tier and the North Country regions of the state, encompassing the western and northern Adirondacks. The channel launched in November 2003 as News 10 Now. In February 2007, the channel launched a separate feed focused on Binghamton, Elmira, Corning and surrounding areas.

Due to the presence of ABC affiliate WSYR-TV, which broadcasts on VHF channel 9, it is the only one of Spectrum's news channels in upstate New York that is not carried on channel 9 in its primary markets; it is instead carried on either channel 10 or channel 14. In March 2010, as part of a rebranding of Time Warner Cable's regional news channels statewide, News 10 Now adopted the "YNN" brand, rebranding as YNN Central New York. The channel was renamed Time Warner Cable News Central New York on December 16, 2013; its subfeed, YNN Southern Tier and YNN North Country, were accordingly and respectively rebranded as Time Warner Cable News Southern Tier and Time Warner Cable News North Country on that date. It then changed its name to Spectrum News Central New York/Southern Tier/North Country on September 20, 2016.

=== Spectrum News 1 Dallas-Fort Worth ===
Spectrum News 1 was launched in Dallas-Fort Worth in October 2020, serving the provider's systems in Dallas and Fort Worth, as well as Wichita Falls. It also serves Southern and Western regions in Texas, adding to Spectrum's existing coverage of Austin and San Antonio. The official launch date for the DFW bureau was October 16, with a team of more than a dozen anchors and meteorologists including Brett Shipp, veteran reporter previously at WFAA, and Charles Divins, former morning anchor at WDSU-TV in New Orleans. From July 15, 2022, to August 3, 2025, Spectrum News 1 Dallas-Fort Worth was available over-the-air via KAZD and through competing pay TV providers due to the Federal Communications Commission's must-carry rules for full power stations.

=== Spectrum News 1 Kansas City ===
Spectrum News 1 Kansas City originated in 1996 as Metro Sports, Time Warner Cable's regional sports network serving the area. On September 26, 2023, it was converted to a Spectrum News channel, while keeping the sports programming, mainly Kansas City Chiefs game analysis programs and high school sports. Spectrum News+ airs outside of sports programs and local inserts.

=== Spectrum News 1 (Kentucky/Southern Indiana) ===
Spectrum News 1 serves Louisville, Lexington, Paducah, Owensboro/Evansville, Indiana, and all other Kentucky communities in which Spectrum provides cable television service, including the Northern Kentucky portion of the Cincinnati, Ohio, market. Louisville, Lexington, Northern Kentucky and several other Kentucky cable markets were once served by legacy Insight Communications systems until the company was acquired by Time Warner Cable in 2012, and are now a part of Spectrum and Charter Communications. Along with Rochester, this variant of Spectrum News 1 is the only Spectrum News network not founded under Time Warner Cable or Charter ownership. The network dated back to the late 2000s as cn|2 (standing for "Community Network", and its main standard definition cable channel 2 slot) under Insight Communications ownership, and aired limited news updates, along with rolling weather updates. The network's service has slowly expanded over time under Time Warner and Charter ownership, now featuring political programs covering the Commonwealth, sports coverage, along with continuous weather coverage. The cn|2 name was retained until Spectrum took control of Time Warner Cable.

On October 29, 2018, the network was re-launched as Spectrum News 1, replacing looped weather forecasts with rolling news and weather coverage from studios based in Louisville. The relaunch also saw the channel move universally to channel 1, displacing Spectrum's video on demand service to a channel 999 shortcut.

=== Spectrum News Massachusetts ===
In December 2019, Spectrum News 1 was launched in Massachusetts, serving the provider's systems in Central and Western Massachusetts, as well as southwestern New Hampshire. It serves areas including Worcester and Pittsfield. It de facto serves as an expansion of the news department for Charter's former regional network, Charter TV3, which Spectrum effectively replaced and was discontinued on October 23, 2020.

=== Spectrum News Maine ===
In August 2021, Charter first announced launching news operations in Maine, the first startup in a market not previously served by a Spectrum News channel. Charter hired six journalists and curated stories from Maine's largest newspapers for its app and website. On September 26, 2023, Charter announced the launch of Spectrum News Maine, a digital-only streaming news service available on the Spectrum app and on smart devices, but not available on linear television. The service has local headlines and weather every 30 minutes, with the remaining content from Spectrum News+, the national news feed of Spectrum News.

=== Spectrum News 1 North Carolina ===
Spectrum News 1 North Carolina serves the entire state of North Carolina, with individual feeds for five regions within the state (the Research Triangle, the Piedmont Triad, Charlotte, Wilmington, and Western North Carolina) that are carried on Spectrum's systems in the respective markets. The channel originally launched as News 14 Carolina on March 22, 2002, in Raleigh; this was followed two months later on June 14 by the launch of its Charlotte feed, and later by sub-feeds for the Piedmont Triad on September 25, 2006, Wilmington on August 18, 2008, and Western NC in January 2021. The channel adopted the name Time Warner Cable News North Carolina on December 16, 2013, and changed its name to Spectrum News North Carolina on September 20, 2016. For most of the 2010s, Spectrum News North Carolina produced newscasts at traditional times on ABC affiliate WXLV-TV. This has since been replaced by an internally produced newscast.

=== Spectrum News 1 (Ohio) ===
On November 7, 2018, Spectrum News 1 Ohio was launched as a 24-hour, statewide news channel. It serves Ohio's three largest cities, Cleveland, Columbus, and Cincinnati, as well as the majority of the state with three regional feeds of news and localized weather forecasts. Taking over the affiliation with the Ohio High School Athletic Association from Spectrum's now-defunct sports channel, Spectrum Sports, Spectrum News 1 is the home of the Ohio High School Football and Basketball championships, other live high school games, select Dayton Flyers basketball games, and Ohio State athletics coverage. The channel is only available to Spectrum subscribers on channel 1.

=== Spectrum News Rochester ===
Spectrum News Rochester serves Rochester, New York, and surrounding areas. The channel launched on September 21, 1989, as "WGRC" (for the city's cable provider at the time, Greater Rochester Cablevision); as such, it is the oldest channel among the Spectrum News networks and the only other one (along with Spectrum News Kentucky) that was not launched by Time Warner Cable or Charter. During this time, it acted as a cable-exclusive general entertainment independent station, airing movies, sitcoms, dramas and cartoons, in addition to a nightly 10:00 p.m. newscast. In 1992, Greater Rochester Cablevision moved "WGRC" to channel 9 and rebranded it as GRC9News; newscasts began to take up an increasing amount of time in the network's schedule. In April 1995, after Time Warner Cable acquired the cable television franchise rights for the area, the channel was renamed R News and was converted into a full 24-hour news channel.

In 2005, some of R News' operations were merged with two of its sister news networks in other parts of New York, Syracuse–based News 10 Now and Albany-based Capital News 9. On August 4, 2009, the channel rebranded as YNN Rochester, becoming the second TWC-owned news channel (after Buffalo-based sister channel YNN Buffalo) to adopt the "YNN" brand. The channel was renamed Time Warner Cable News Rochester on December 16, 2013. It then changed its name to Spectrum News Rochester on September 20, 2016.

=== Spectrum News 1 (Southern California) ===
On November 16, 2018, Spectrum News 1 Southern California was launched as a 24-hour, all-local news channel to serve most of Southern California. The channel is available to Charter Spectrum subscribers, as well as Cox Cable subscribers on the Palos Verdes Peninsula and in southern Orange County on Channel 99. It offers the morning news show The Beat on 1 as well as local newscasts throughout the day and panel discussion shows in the evening. It is not available to all Charter Spectrum subscribers in the region as the Bakersfield area does not seem to have a channel. The channel is split into four feeds - LA/West, LA/East - Inland Empire, San Fernando Valley/Ventura, and Orange County, although in most instances the localization consists merely of local traffic and weather on the on-screen crawl. Spectrum News has a partnership with the Los Angeles Times and hosts Times reporters and opinion writers for discussion and interviews at its studios in El Segundo, near the Times offices. Veteran news anchors who joined Spectrum News 1 Southern California include Alex Cohen, Lisa McRee and Giselle Fernandez.

=== Spectrum News 1 (Wisconsin) ===
Spectrum News 1 serves Milwaukee, Madison, and Green Bay and the Fox Cities with three separate feeds; one for Milwaukee, one for Green Bay, also serving the Wausau market, and the Madison feed serving the rest of Spectrum's service area in the western, central and northern part of the state including the La Crosse, Eau Claire and Duluth/Superior markets. All of the Wisconsin feeds originate from studios in downtown Milwaukee within Spectrum's regional headquarters, along with bureaus throughout the state. The network launched on November 28, 2018, effectively serving as the de facto replacement for Spectrum Sports (a network never added to Charter's legacy systems in the state after the Time Warner Cable purchase; Time Warner had considered launching an all-news channel in the region, but ultimately opted for a more scalable sports network instead), which had wound down its sports rights due to many of its partners taking their rights in-house or to new digital-only partners. Some of the latter network's staff remains with Spectrum News 1, along with an existing content agreement with the Green Bay Packers.

The network is carried on channel 1 universally throughout the state on Spectrum; as with Kentucky, it displaced Spectrum's on demand service to the channel 999 shortcut. For viewers without automatic HD tuning, the channel is carried in high definition on channel 1001 on legacy Time Warner systems, and channel 700 on legacy Charter systems. On modern Charter Spectrum systems, the network is carried on Cable channel 364 in Standard definition, and Cable channel 1364 in high definition.

== Related channels ==
=== NY1 ===
NY1 (also known as Spectrum News NY1 and spoken as "New York One") serves the New York City metropolitan area, and is the only channel that restricts the "Spectrum News" name to a sub-brand. Although it shares content with the other Spectrum News channels, it maintains different programming than Charter's other New York–based news channels; it is the only such channel that does not carry Capital Tonight, but does produce its own specialty programs such as Inside City Hall (which is renamed Road to City Hall during New York City mayoral elections). The channel launched on September 8, 1992. Unlike the other Spectrum News channels, NY1 is carried on providers other than Charter (including Optimum Communications's New York City area systems and the Orlando and Tampa, Florida, systems that were operated by Bright House Networks (which was managed by Time Warner Cable)) prior to their acquisition by Charter. It also operates NY1 Noticias for Spanish-speaking Hispanic American viewers. It is also carried some in Spectrum markets outside of the New York Tri-State region as a higher-tier offering on traditional digital cable, with local advertising bedded over with public service announcements.

=== Spectrum News NECN ===
Spectrum News NECN serves the New England region. Although it shares resources with the Central Massachusetts and Maine Spectrum News operations, it maintains separate on-air staff. The channel launched on March 9, 1992, as New England Cable News, and was relaunched under the Spectrum News brand following its acquisition from NBCUniversal by Charter Communications in 2026.

=== Spectrum Bay News 9 ===
Bay News 9 (also officially known as Spectrum Bay News 9 as of September 24, 2017) is a cable news television network located in St. Petersburg, Florida, and began operating on September 24, 1997. It serves the Tampa Bay area including Hillsborough, Pinellas, Manatee, Polk, Pasco, Hernando, and Citrus counties.

=== Spectrum News 13 ===
News 13 (also officially known as Spectrum News 13 as of September 24, 2017) is focused primarily on Central Florida, specifically Brevard, Flagler, Lake, Marion, Orange, Osceola, Seminole, Sumter, and Volusia counties. The channel originally launched on October 29, 1997, as Central Florida News 13; it was originally partnered with the Orlando Sentinel to help with 24-hour newsgathering operations and the channel was originally operated by Time Warner Cable, which relinquished cable television franchise rights in the Orlando metropolitan area to Bright House Networks in 2001.

=== Spectrum News+ ===
Spectrum News+ is a streaming-only channel that combines Spectrum reporting from local channels hosted by an anchor and rebroadcasts of Spectrum signature shows from various markets. The initial hosts, Bree Driscoll and Sharon Tazewell, anchor from the NY1 studios. The channel is available to all Spectrum customers, including those who do not have a local Spectrum news channel.

== Online news service ==
In markets where Spectrum does not have a news channel, Spectrum has hired reporters to provide community news to visitors to their web site. Markets with Spectrum News operations and no television presence include St. Louis and Hawaii.

== See also ==
- News 12 Networks – a similar group of 24-hour regional cable news channels operated by Optimum Communications.
- FiOS1 – a similar group of 24-hour regional cable news channels formerly operated by Verizon FiOS.
