= Spectrum News 13 =

24 hour cable news network

- Country: United States
- Broadcast area: Central Florida
- Network: Spectrum News
- Headquarters: Orlando, Florida

Programming
- Language: English
- Picture format: 1080i (HDTV) (HD feed downgraded to letterboxed 480i for SDTVs)

Ownership
- Owner: Charter Communications
- Sister channels: Bay News 9

History
- Launched: October 29, 1997; 28 years ago
- Replaced: Spectrum Sports Florida (in Orlando)
- Former names: Central Florida News 13 (1997–2013)

Links
- Website: www.mynews13.com

Availability

Streaming media
- Spectrum News and Spectrum TV apps: 13 (within Orlando metro); 2202 (nationwide)

News 13 (also officially known as Spectrum News 13 as of September 24, 2017) is an American cable news television channel owned by Charter Communications. The channel provides 24-hour rolling news coverage focused primarily on Central Florida, specifically Brevard, Flagler, Lake, Marion, Orange, Osceola, Seminole, Sumter, and Volusia counties.

== History ==
The channel originally launched in October 29, 1997 as Central Florida News 13; it was originally partnered with the Orlando Sentinel to help with 24-hour newsgathering operations and the channel was originally operated by Time Warner Cable, which relinquished cable television franchise rights in the Orlando metropolitan area to Bright House Networks in 2001. On December 14, 2010, the channel was added to Bright House's system in the Tampa Bay area, on digital channel 1213; the channel is offered in addition to the provider's local news channel in the area, Bay News 9.

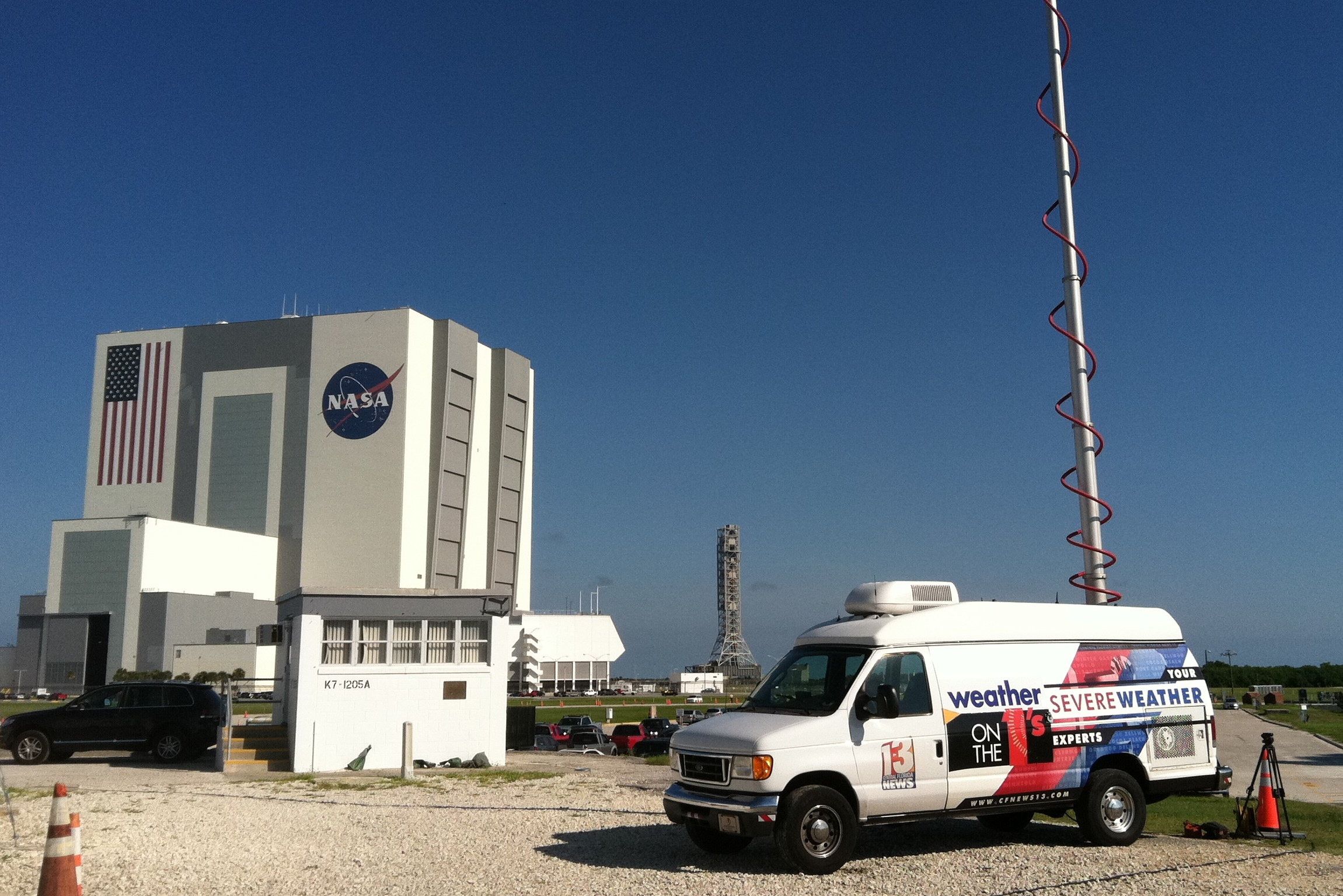
News 13 microwave (ENG) truck at the Kennedy Space Center prior to a launch; the logo package seen here was used until August 27, 2013.

On November 1, 2011, Central Florida News 13 launched a high definition simulcast feed and began airing its newscasts in the format. As part of the upgrade, the channel installed a new master control system and unveiled a slightly modified graphics package.

The channel unveiled a major branding overhaul on August 27, 2013, the most significant in the channel's history. It shortened its name from "Central Florida News 13" to simply News 13 (its website domain was accordingly changed cfnews13.com to mynews13.com); the channel also adopted a logo based on that used by its sister channel in the Tampa Bay region known as Bay News 9 and introduced a new news music ("Primetime News" by Non-Stop Music, which has been used by Bay News 9 since its September 1997 launch) and graphics package, the latter of which is designed to fit 16:9 television sets. Its longtime slogan "All Local, All The Time." was also dropped in favor of the concise "News. Weather. Now.". The logo has been designed by the network's in-house team. The network had expanded away with its newscasts with original programming. Also that day, they launched News 13 24/7, but with the name change, it kept the News 13 branding, when the network ran that channel.

On April 1, 2015, Charter Communications announced that it would be acquiring Bright House Networks, alongside its merger with Time Warner Cable. The acquisition, which was valued at around $71 billion, was completed on May 18, 2016. To reflect this change in ownership, News 13 underwent another name change, going from "News 13" to Spectrum News 13.

On June 12, 2016, during the Orlando nightclub shooting, News 13 received a call from the perpetrator, Omar Mateen. He told News 13 at 2:45 a.m., "I'm the shooter. It's me. I am the shooter." He then said he was carrying out the shooting on behalf of ISIL and began speaking rapidly in Arabic. Mateen also said the shooting was "triggered" by a U.S.-led bombing strike in Iraq that killed Abu Wahib, an ISIL military commander, on May 6, 2016.

On February 22, 2023, News 13 journalist Dylan Lyons and photographer Jesse Walden were shot in a Pine Hills, Florida neighborhood while covering the scene of a fatal shooting that had killed a woman earlier the same day after the suspected shooter returned to the scene of the crime. Lyons died from his injuries, while Walden was hospitalized in critical condition. The suspected shooter, 19-year-old Keith Melvin Moses, who had an extensive criminal history, also fatally shot a 9-year-old girl and injured her mother shortly after attacking the news crew. On January 29, 2025, the family of Lyons filed a lawsuit against Spectrum News 13's owner, Charter Communications. The lawsuit alleged that Charter Communications had the responsibility to provide staff with proper safety equipment while working in the field and conduct an appropriate risk assessment before sending the news crew into the area while Moses was still at large.

== Programming ==
The channel operates on a 24-Hour News Cycle clock and utilizes the "Wheel" format, allowing for blocks of news segments, weather and other content.

Weather forecasts are carried in ten-minute intervals under the brand "Weather on the Ones" which is used by almost all Spectrum News branded channels. During severe weather or during tropical weather, such as a tropical storm or hurricane, weather can extend into "wall-to-wall" coverage.

Live programming is separated by daypart: Your Morning News, News All Day, and Your Evening News. When not live, the channel operates in a wheel or jukebox format, utilizing recordings of news programming to fill in offline programming hours.

Your Morning News airs live starting at 5:00 a.m. and remains live every half hour until 9 a.m. and the Morning wheel runs till Noon. News All Day airs live starting at Noon and is only live for the first ten minutes of the hour, and the wheel runs till 5 p.m. Your Evening News airs live starting at 5 p.m. and stays live through the 6 p.m. hour before returning with a refreshed wheel.

== Special Programming ==
Special Programming on News 13 is offered both in weekly and nightly shows as well as daypart specific special segments.

=== Political Connections ===
Political Connections, is a half-hour political discussion program which airs weeknights at 7 p.m. with an encore at 11:30 p.m. This program is produced in tandem with their sister station Bay News 9 and is currently hosted by Morning News anchor, Ybeth Bruzual from News 13 and Evening News anchor, Holly Gregory from Bay News 9.

=== In Focus ===
In Focus with Allison Walker is a half-hour public affairs program that covers Florida, and is simulcast in both markets. It is a similar program format to NY1's In Focus with Cheryl Willis. It airs Sundays at 11:30 a.m. with an encore at 8:30 p.m.

=== Other Daypart Programming ===
There are other daypart specific offerings, such as A+ Teacher, Everyday Heroes, Pursuit Unlimited and Florida On A Tankful.

=== Space Coast Coverage ===
Spectrum News 13 has an on air promise of broadcasting all rocket launches from the nearby Cape Canaveral Space Force Station and Kennedy Space Center. It operates under the branding Destination Space and has a dedicated Space Coast team of reporters and producers who focus strictly on spaceflight and rocket launches.

Due to the rise in commercial spaceflight and SpaceX's active launch site located at Kennedy Space Center, News 13 also offers an updating list of upcoming launches. SpaceX's Falcon-9 rocket launching Starlink satellites tend to be the most common rocket launch to be able to see, but they cover all launches coming from Brevard County.

== Notable personalities ==
=== Notable current political analysts ===
- Dick Batchelor – former member of the Florida House of Representatives

=== Notable former political analysts ===
- Lou Frey – former member of the U.S. House of Representatives

=== Notable former personalities ===
- Vinnie Politan – anchor/reporter; now at Court TV
- Jessica Yellin – anchor/reporter; now national political correspondent at CNN

== Affiliated channels ==
=== Central Florida News 13 en Español ===
On March 11, 2011, Bright House Networks announced that it would merge Central Florida News 13 and Bay News 9's respective Spanish-language news channels into a single regional channel, InfoMás. The regional network was launched on July 12, 2011.

== See also ==
- Bay News 9 – a similar regional news channel owned by Charter Communications that serves the Tampa Bay area
- Spectrum Sports (Florida) – co-owned regional sports network serving Central Florida
- WSNN-LD – a similar regional news channel that serves the Sarasota area
