= Spectrum News 1 Rochester =

24-hour local news channel from Charter Communications

- Country: United States
- Broadcast area: Western New York
- Network: Spectrum News
- Headquarters: Rochester, New York

Programming
- Language: English
- Picture format: 1080i (HDTV); 480i (SDTV)

Ownership
- Owner: Charter Communications
- Sister channels: NY1; Spectrum News Austin; Spectrum News Buffalo; Spectrum News Central New York; Spectrum News Capital Region; Spectrum News 1 North Carolina

History
- Launched: September 21, 1989; 37 years ago
- Former names: WGRC-TV (1989–1992); GRC9 (1992–1995); R News (1995–2009); YNN Rochester (2009–2013); Time Warner Cable News Rochester (2013–2016); Spectrum News Rochester (2016–2021)

Links
- Website: spectrumlocalnews.com/nys/rochester (Rochester)

Spectrum News 1 Rochester (formerly Spectrum News Rochester and Time Warner Cable News Rochester) is an American cable news television channel owned by Charter Communications through its acquisition of Time Warner Cable in May 2016, as an affiliate of its Spectrum News slate of regional news channels. The channel provides 24-hour rolling news coverage focused primarily on Rochester, New York and the nearby Genesee River and Finger Lakes regions.

The channel is carried on channel 9 in standard definition, as well as high definition, the latter of which is typically rendered automatically by those Charter Communications customers' high definition supported set-top boxes. Standard definition feeds come through to those customers who purchase Spectrum's Basic-Tier level of cable service. As of March 6, 2018, all customers are required to utilize digital receivers to view the station. These digital receivers come in two types: High Definition Multimedia Interface - HDMI - supported High Definition television digital receivers, and for those televisions void of HDMI connectivity, standard digital receivers. Higher tiered customers view the channel on digital channel 200 in high definition in Rochester. Channel 14 in other Charter Communications systems within the region fill in the extent of the area's coverage. As with the rest of its upstate sister news channels in upstate New York, Spectrum News Rochester shares news content with New York City-based NY1, Charter Communications' flagship regional cable news channel (which the provider carries on the digital tiers of its Upstate New York systems).

== History ==
=== As an entertainment-formatted cable channel; expansion of news programming ===
The channel launched on September 21, 1989, as a local origination channel using the fictional call sign "WGRC-TV" (standing for "Greater Rochester Cablevision," the original predecessor of Charter’s present-day cable operation in the area); as such, it is the oldest channel among the Spectrum News networks and one of two that was not launched by Charter Communications or predecessor Time Warner Cable (the other being Spectrum News 1 of Kentucky, which launched under the ownership of Insight Communications). Originally carried on Greater Rochester Cablevision channel 5, the channel originally maintained a format modeled after general entertainment independent stations (such as that of WUHF [channel 31] prior to and after affiliating with Fox in October 1986). On weekdays, WGRC ran a mix of syndicated sitcoms and drama series (consisting of classic sitcoms from 9:00 a.m. to noon, family-oriented and then-relatively-recent off-network sitcoms from 5:00 to 8:00 p.m. and a mix of sitcoms and dramas in late night after 11:00 p.m.), syndicated cartoons (from 6:00 to 9:00 a.m. and 2:00 to 5:00 p.m.), and daily movie showcases at noon and 8:00 p.m.; weekends consisted of a mix of movies, drama series and children's animated series. The channel launched a news department on April 22, 1990, with the premiere of News 5 Rochester: The Ten O'clock News, a nightly half-hour broadcast that was the first local prime time newscast ever offered in the Rochester market. Gradually, the channel's programming evolved to include additional syndicated talk shows and game shows, while continuing to feature some off-network cartoons, sitcoms and feature film packages.

On February 3, 1992, the service was moved to channel 9, and was rebranded as "GRC9"; while it continued to air morning cartoons and movies in early prime time, the channel's schedule shifted by this time to feature syndicated talk shows from noon to 3:00 p.m., cartoon shorts and animated series from 3:00 to 5:00 p.m., sitcoms from 5:00 to 7:00 p.m., and talk shows and rebroadcasts of its local newscasts in late night. After the channel move and rebranding, GRC9's newscasts adopted a presentation model based on that pioneered in 1987 by Moses Znaimer for CITY-TV/Toronto's CityPulse newscasts: its traditional anchor-desk-centered news set was replaced with an open newsroom, in which anchors were positioned in various sections of the newsroom (such as the assignment desk, monitor banks, and a glass-etched map of Rochester). The channel also undertook a gradual expansion of its news programming, adding an early evening newscast at 7:00 p.m. upon the rebrand, followed in 1993 by the premiere of a three-hour-long morning newscast (airing from 6:00 to 9:00 a.m.). On April 4, 1993, GRC9 retitled its newscasts as "R News" to signify their local focus. The channel would continue its evolution into a primarily news-based programming format: a midday newscast at noon was added in 1994 and in early 1995, evening newscasts were expanded to 4:00 p.m., replacing cartoons and syndicated sitcoms.

=== As a 24-hour local news channel ===
After Time Warner Cable acquired the cable television franchise rights for the area, the channel was renamed again on July 4, 1995, adopting "R News" as its universalized branding and converting the channel to a 24-hour rolling news format. The remaining syndicated programming on GRC9's schedule would subsequently be moved to "WRWB-TV", which Time Warner Cable launched (initially carried on channel 26) to provide WB network programming to the market. ("WRWB" converted into a broadcast service on the DT2 subchannel of ABC affiliate WHAM-TV [channel 13] in November 2006.)

On May 25, 2005, Time Warner Cable announced that it would eliminate 30 staff positions from the channel and Syracuse-based sister network News 10 Now in a cost-saving consolidation of its three regional news channels at the time in Upstate New York. News 10 Now and R News's technical production and master control operations were transferred to Albany-based sister channel Capital News 9, which began serving as a hub for all three news channels. (Sister network NY1 continued to maintain separate master control operations at its Manhattan facilities.)

With the move, Capital News 9 began serving as the production and studio hub for the news programming of both channels, while News 10 Now began handling production responsibilities for weather forecast segments for all of its sister news channels statewide, using the channel's weather staff. Each of the channels retained their respective news gathering crews, producers, facilities and news management; the channels also simulcast the Albany-produced political review program Capital Tonight. In addition, the cable access channels on the systems in each of the channels' markets began sharing broadcasts of collegiate sporting events in the event that Time Warner Cable could secure the rights to air the telecasts in all of its upstate markets.

On August 4, 2009, at 5:00 a.m. Eastern Time, the channel was renamed as YNN Rochester, becoming the second TWC-owned regional news channel to adopt the "YNN" ("Your News Now") brand, after Buffalo-based sister channel YNN Buffalo (which became the pilot service for the new brand when that channel launched on March 25, 2009). The "YNN" brand was later expanded to its sister channels in Syracuse (as YNN Central New York) and Albany (as YNN Capital Region). On December 16, 2013, the channel rebranded as Time Warner Cable News Rochester as part of a branding standardization across the provider's news channels that included the introduction of a new graphics and music package.

On September 20, 2016, it was announced that all TWC News channels would be renamed under the Spectrum News brand as a result of Charter Communications' then-recent acquisition of Time Warner Cable. The transition was completed on March 14, 2017, with Time Warner Cable News Rochester being renamed Spectrum News Rochester. Nearly one year following the initial changeover announcement, on September 18, 2017, Spectrum News Rochester retooled to a modernized, 4K-inspired graphics and music package.

In May 2021, Spectrum News Rochester was renamed Spectrum News 1 Rochester.
