= Spectrum News 1 Capital Region =

- Country: United States
- Broadcast area: Albany, New York
- Network: Spectrum News
- Headquarters: Albany, New York

Programming
- Language: English
- Picture format: 480i (SDTV)

Ownership
- Owner: Charter Communications
- Sister channels: NY1; Spectrum News Austin; Spectrum News Buffalo; Spectrum News Central New York; Spectrum News North Carolina; Spectrum News Rochester

History
- Launched: October 11, 2002; 24 years ago
- Former names: Capital News 9 (2002–2010); YNN Albany (2010–2013); Time Warner Cable News Albany (2013-2016)

Links
- Website: www.twcnews.com/nys/capital-region.html (Capital Region) www.twcnews.com/nys/hudson-valley.html (Hudson Valley)

Spectrum News 1 Capital Region (formerly Time Warner Cable News Capital Region) is an American cable news television channel owned by Charter Communications as an affiliate of its Spectrum News slate of regional news channels. The channel provides 24-hour rolling news coverage focused primarily on the Capital District of eastern New York. The channel is headquartered in Albany, New York, and maintains a sub feed serving the Hudson Valley region. Spectrum News 1 Capital Region is carried on channel 9 throughout most of the region, although its channel slot varies in the towns of Queensbury and Canajoharie, and in Berkshire County, Massachusetts.

As with the rest of its upstate sister news channels in upstate New York, Spectrum News 1 Capital Region shares news content with New York City-based NY1, Charter's flagship regional cable news channel (which the provider carries on the digital tiers of its Upstate New York systems).

== History ==
Prior to the launch of the channel, Time Warner Cable carried a repurposed rebroadcast of the 6:00 p.m. newscast from CBS affiliate WRGB (channel 6) on its local origination channel on channel 9. After Nielsen ratings reports showed that the broadcast was competitive with the fledgling 6:30 p.m. newscast on Fox affiliate WXXA-TV (channel 23), Time Warner Cable moved forward with plans to launch an in-house 24-hour news channel.

The channel was launched on October 11, 2002 as Capital News 9. Its debuted nearly a year behind schedule due to various infrastructure and staffing delays. With the launch of Capital News 9, Time Warner Cable's public access channel was moved from channel 9 to channel 3 on most of its Capital District systems (and became known as TW3). Capital News 9 came out of a period when Time Warner Cable rolled out several cable news channels. Within a two-year period, the provider had launched regional news channels in Syracuse (News 10 Now), Houston, (News 24 Houston) and San Antonio (News 9 San Antonio). Two channels were also launched in North Carolina, one based in Raleigh and another in Charlotte (both referred to as News 14 Carolina). Of the channels that launched, only Time Warner Cable News Central New York (the former News 10 Now) and Time Warner Cable News North Carolina (the former News 14 Carolina, which operates four region-specific feeds) remain, the byproduct of financial losses and a dispute with the Belo Corporation, which was a partner in the Texas and Charlotte channels.

On May 25, 2005, Time Warner Cable announced that it would eliminate 30 staff positions from sister networks R News in Rochester and News 10 Now in Syracuse in a cost-saving consolidation of its three regional news channels at the time in upstate New York. News 10 Now and R News's technical production and master control operations were merged with Capital News 9. With the move, Capital News 9 began serving as the production and studio hub for the news programming of both channels (with Capital News 9's anchor staff handling simultaneous on-air duties on both sister channels), while News 10 Now began handling production responsibilities for weather forecast segments for all of its sister news channels statewide from its Syracuse facility (using the channel's weather staff). Each of the channels retained their respective newsgathering crews, producers, facilities and news management; the channels also simulcast the Albany-produced political review program Capital Tonight. In addition, the cable access channels on the systems in each of the channels' markets now share broadcasts of collegiate sporting events in the event that Time Warner Cable is able to secure the rights to air the telecasts in all of its upstate markets.

In August 2006, Capital News 9 expanded its reach to systems within eastern New York that Time Warner Cable had recently acquired from Adelphia Communications. In April 2008, Capital News 9 began simulcasting its audio full-time on local radio station WUAM (900 AM); the simulcasting agreement with the channel ended in 2014, upon mutual agreement by both parties not to renew the contract.

On February 12, 2010, Time Warner Cable announced that Capital News 9 and News 10 Now would be rebranded as "YNN" (for "Your News Now"), adopting the same brand that had already been in use on their sister channels in Buffalo and Rochester (the former of which was the first to adopt the "YNN" brand when it launched in March 2009). The rebranding occurred in March 2010. The following month in April 2010, the channel launched a subfeed for the Hudson Valley region, YNN Hudson Valley.

On December 16, 2013, the channel rebranded as Time Warner Cable News Capital Region as part of a branding standardization across the provider's news channels that included the introduction of a new graphics and music package. The channel's Hudson Valley sub feed was accordingly rebranded from YNN Hudson Valley to Time Warner Cable News Hudson Valley.

With the acquisition of TWC by Charter Communications in 2016, the "Time Warner Cable News" branding has been dropped from all networks in favor of "Spectrum News", after Charter's primary consumer brand on September 20, 2016.

On July 27, 2018, the New York Public Service Commission revoked Charter's cable franchises in the state of New York, citing failures to meet conditions imposed on the provider as part of the TWC purchase. Despite the revocation of Charter's cable franchises in New York, the future fate of Spectrum News Capital Region after Spectrum's exit from New York State is currently unknown.

In May 2021, the channel was re-branded again to Spectrum News 1 Capital Region.
