= Spectrum News 1 Buffalo =

- Country: United States
- Broadcast area: Western New York
- Network: Spectrum News
- Headquarters: Buffalo, New York

Programming
- Language: English
- Picture format: 1080i (HDTV); 480i (SDTV)

Ownership
- Owner: Charter Communications
- Sister channels: Spectrum News Rochester; Spectrum News Capital Region; Spectrum News Central New York; NY1; Spectrum News Austin; Spectrum News North Carolina

History
- Launched: March 25, 2009; 17 years ago
- Former names: YNN Buffalo (2009–2013); Time Warner Cable News Buffalo (2013-2016); Spectrum News Buffalo (2016-2021)

Links
- Website: spectrumlocalnews.com/nys/buffalo (Buffalo) spectrumlocalnews.com/nys/jamestown (Jamestown)

Spectrum News 1 Buffalo (formerly Spectrum News Buffalo and Time Warner Cable News Buffalo) is an American cable news television channel owned by Charter Communications, as an affiliate of its Spectrum News slate of regional news channels. The channel provides 24-hour rolling news coverage focused primarily on the Buffalo metropolitan area and Western New York. The channel is carried on Time Warner Cable systems throughout Western New York on channel 9; it is also carried on TWC's Rochester system on digital channel 1277. A modified feed of the channel, Cable 8 News (C8N), is available on Spectrum's Jamestown system, featuring a mix of local news content and content from Spectrum News 1 Buffalo.

As with the rest of its upstate sister news channels in upstate New York, Spectrum News 1 Buffalo shares news content with New York City-based NY1, Charter's flagship regional cable news channel (which the provider carries on the digital tiers of its Upstate New York systems). As with all Spectrum News channels, Spectrum News 1 Buffalo and C8N are exclusive to Charter Spectrum subscribers; areas of Western New York not served by Charter Spectrum (as of 2017, this includes only a portion of central and southern Cattaraugus County) cannot access the channel.

== History ==
The channel was launched at 7:00 p.m. Eastern Time on March 25, 2009, as YNN Buffalo. It was initially carried on channel 14 on Time Warner Cable's Buffalo system, before moving to channel 9 in late 2009; YNN also replaced Erie-based NBC affiliate WICU-TV on its Chautauqua County system, local origination channel Time Warner 8 on its Jamestown system and Toronto-based CTV owned-and-operated station CFTO-TV in Toronto on most of its other systems in the region.

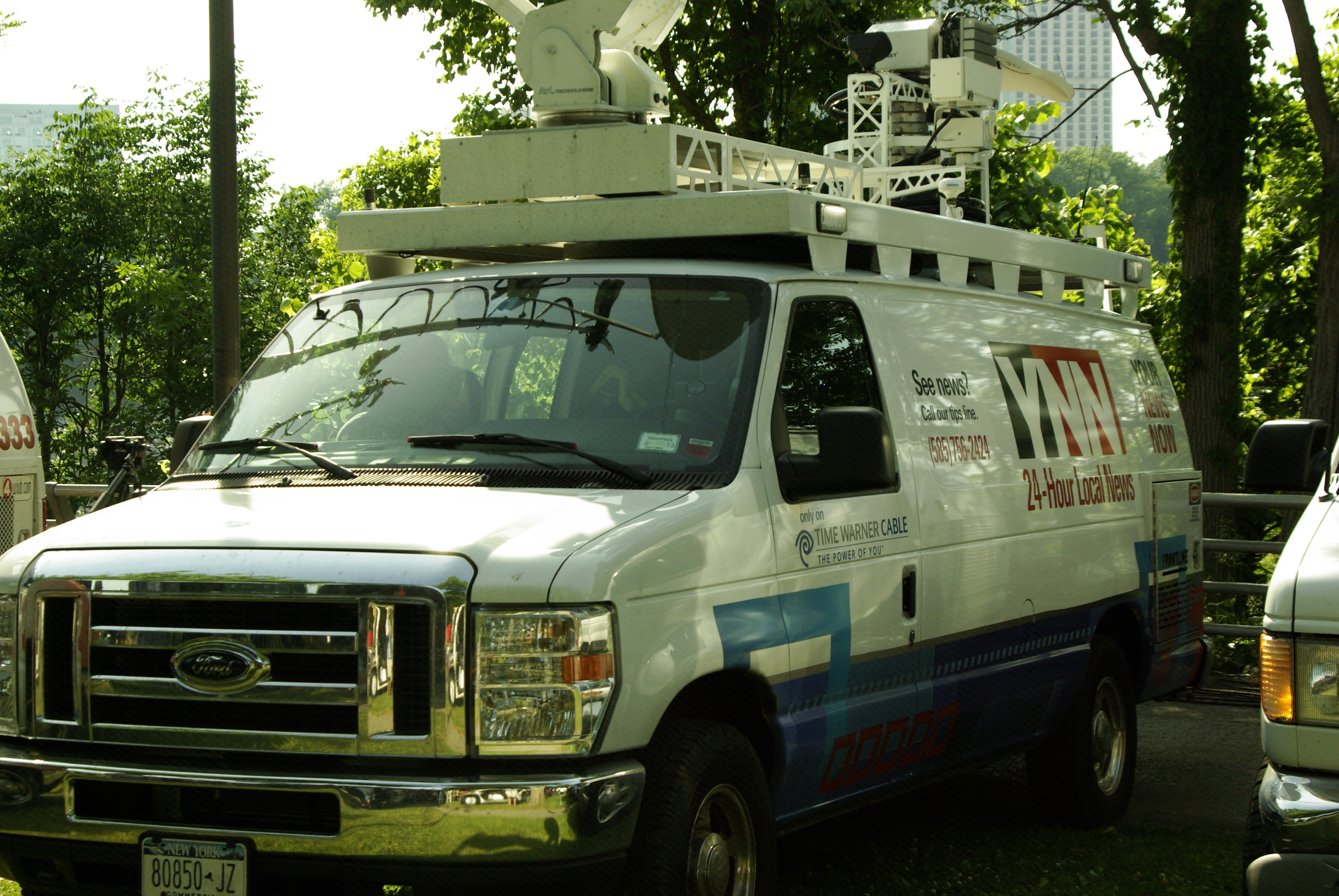
YNN Buffalo live truck

YNN Buffalo was the first regional news channel owned by Time Warner Cable to use the "YNN" brand (standing for "Your News Now"), which Time Warner Cable would later expand the following month to its Rochester-based news channel R News. On February 12, 2010, the provider announced that it would expand the "YNN" brand to two of its other news channels in upstate New York – News 10 Now and Capital News 9. The "YNN" brand later expanded to News 8 Austin in 2011 (although NY1 would never adopt the brand and News 14 Carolina would only use "Your News Now" as a slogan and not a branding).

In early 2010, YNN Buffalo became the first regional news channel owned by Time Warner Cable to launch a high definition simulcast feed. On December 16, 2013, the channel rebranded as Time Warner Cable News Buffalo as part of a branding standardization across the provider's news channels (meant to make it as obvious as possible that the channel was only available on Time Warner Cable) that included the introduction of a new graphics and music package.

On September 20, 2016, it was announced that all TWC News channels would be rebranded as Spectrum News months after Charter acquired Time Warner Cable.

In 2021, the channel was renamed to Spectrum News 1 Buffalo.
