= Spectrum Sports (Florida) =

- Country: United States
- Broadcast area: St. Petersburg and Orlando, Florida
- Headquarters: Orlando, Florida

Programming
- Language: English
- Picture format: 480i (SDTV); 1080i (HDTV)

Ownership
- Owner: Charter Communications

History
- Launched: 2004; 22 years ago
- Replaced: Bright House Networks 47
- Closed: December 16, 2017; 8 years ago
- Replaced by: Bay News 9 News 13
- Former names: Catch 47 (2004–2008); Bright House Sports Network (2008-2016)

Links
- Website: Bay News 9 website News 13 website

Spectrum Sports (formerly known as Bright House Sports Network) was an American regional sports network serving the Tampa Bay and Orlando metropolitan areas of Florida, that was owned by cable television provider Charter Communications which exclusively carried the channel on Standard Definition channel 47 and High Definition channel 1147.

== History ==
Logo as Catch 47, used from 2004 to 2008.

The channel was originally established in the Tampa Bay area in 2004, as Catch 47 (named after its cable channel slot). In September 2008, Corporate VP Elliott Wiser and General Manager Paul Kosuth relaunched the channel as Bright House Sports Network. The Network's carriage was expanded to Bright House's Central Florida systems. In 2012, the channel won sole rights to air all post season high school games. Bright House was acquired by Charter in May 2016, along with Time Warner Cable, and on November 15, 2016, Bright House Sports Network was renamed as Spectrum Sports, as Bright House on the same day became Spectrum.

In 2009, ESPN Inc. acquired a 27% stake in the channel and spun off its stake to Bright House in 2010.

As part of a company-wide restructuring, the channel is slated to be discontinued by the end of 2017. It signed off earlier than expected on December 16, 2017.

== Programming ==
Logo as Bright House Sports Network, used from 2008 to 2016.

Programs featured on Spectrum Sports include Spectrum Sports Sport Stories, a monthly show covering local stories and interviews, Prep Sports Showcase, and "The Sunday Night Fish Fry," which includes Average Angler Adventures.

The channel airs local high school sports in the "Game of the Week" series, covering football, basketball, baseball, softball, volleyball, and soccer events. Spectrum Sports provides the semi-finals and finals from the Florida High School Athletic Association in swimming and diving, cheerleading, lacrosse, basketball, baseball, softball, volleyball, and soccer.

Spectrum Sports provides select coverage of the University of South Florida Bulls athletics, including: football and basketball. In late 2008, the channel used its expanded coverage within the Central Florida market to start televising basketball and football games of the University of Central Florida. The first few games were rebroadcasts from Comcast/Charter Sports Southeast (CSS) and the CBS College Sports Network; however, on January 6, 2009 Bright House Sports Network produced its first UCF basketball game against the College of the Holy Cross. Bright House Networks (now Charter Communications) is also the sponsor of UCF's on-campus stadium, Bright House Networks Stadium.

In addition, Spectrum Sports airs nationwide sports programs from sources such as ESPN Plus and America One. During the overnight hours, it simulcasts programming from ESPNEWS.

Prior to 2010, the channel aired Press Box, Xtra Point, Lightning Strikes, The Baysball Show and Beef 'O' Brady's High School Scoreboard. The Toyota Sports Connection, a nightly show focusing on local professional and college teams, ran from 1997 to 2011. Bright House Sports Network also broadcast most home games and occasional road games of the Arena Football League's Tampa Bay Storm before the league folded in 2009. The announcing team for the Storm games generally consisted of Drew Fellios and former NFL punter Mark Royals.

=== Programming on other channels ===
On March 25, 2007, SportsNet New York (a similar regional sports network in the New York metropolitan area) rebroadcast then-Catch 47's coverage of a game between the Tampa Bay Storm and the New York Dragons from two days earlier. SNY opted to broadcast the game straight from the Catch 47 broadcast, neither editing any part of the coverage (aside from commercials), nor dubbing the game with SNY's own announcers. In 2012, BHSN provided other channels belonging to Time Warner with fitness shows from its On Demand service.

=== Versus rebroadcast ===
On May 7, 2007, Versus (a channel by Comcast) also rebroadcast the Catch 47's coverage of a game between the Tampa Bay Storm and the New York Dragons from two days earlier.

=== ESPN2 airing ===
ESPN2 re-aired Catch 47's coverage of a game between the Tampa Bay Storm and the New York Dragons on June 7, 2007.

== Other services ==
=== Spectrum Sports On Demand ===
Spectrum Sports On Demand, which is carried on channel 520, carries ESPN Local including select University of Florida, Florida State University, University of South Florida, and University of Miami football and basketball games. Coverage showcasing local high school bands, cheerleading squads, and dance teams airs weekly. Specials featured on the video on demand service also include Red Bull Flugtag, Tampa dragon boat races, and Clearwater and Orlando speed boat races.
