= Spectrum News 1 Kansas City =

American regional sports network

- Country: United States
- Broadcast area: Kansas City metropolitan area Lincoln, Nebraska
- Network: Spectrum News
- Headquarters: Kansas City, Missouri

Programming
- Language: English
- Picture format: 1080i (HDTV); 480i (SDTV)

Ownership
- Owner: Charter Communications

History
- Launched: December 12, 1996; 28 years ago
- Former names: Metro Sports (1996–2013); Time Warner Cable SportsChannel (2013–2016); Spectrum Sports Kansas City (2016–2023)

Links
- Website: https://spectrumnews1.com/mo/kansas-city

Spectrum News 1 Kansas City is an American regional sports and news cable and satellite television network owned by Charter Communications. The channel mainly serves the Kansas City metropolitan area; Lawrence, Kansas; and the state of Nebraska. In addition to being carried on Charter Spectrum systems in the Kansas City area, it is currently available on cable providers such as Comcast and MIDCO in metropolitan Kansas City, Lawrence, and areas of Nebraska.

== Background ==
=== Metro Sports: 1996–2013 ===
The channel was launched on December 12, 1996 as Metro Sports, and was founded by Time Warner Cable. It has produced live sporting events for collegiate athletic conferences such as the Big 12 Conference, Missouri Valley Conference, the Summit League, the National Association of Intercollegiate Athletics (NAIA) and their individual members. The channel's other hallmark programming is its coverage of local Kansas City high school athletics, including its "HyVee High School Game of The Week" featuring top local teams in football, basketball, wrestling, volleyball, baseball, soccer and other sports.

Metro Sports logo used from 1996 to 2010.

Metro Sports also broadcast five games of the Missouri Mavericks of the Central Hockey League during the 2010–2011 Central Hockey League season. In March 2009, Metro Sports produced and televised live all 31 games of the 2009 NAIA Division I men's basketball tournament, which was held in Kansas City, Missouri.

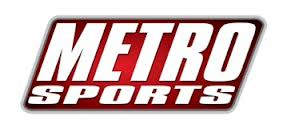
Metro Sports logo used from 2010 to 2013.

Metro Sports formerly produced live sporting events for professional sports teams such as Major League Soccer's Kansas City Wizards (including a Spanish language audio simulcast transmitted over a secondary audio program channel during its final two seasons of coverage, before the Wizards declined to renew their broadcasting contract), and the Kansas City Brigade of the Arena Football League, before the league was liquidated and reincarnated. Metro Sports also produced and televised Kansas City Royals games from 2003 to 2007, after which it lost the rights to FSN Midwest.

Metro Sports has published a book, More Than The Score: Kansas City Sports Memories. On March 1, 2010, Metro Sports launched Metro Sports HD, a high definition simulcast feed of Metro Sports, and a secondary channel, Metro Sports 2.

=== Time Warner Cable SportsChannel: 2013–2016 ===
In September 2013, the channel was renamed as the Time Warner Cable SportsChannel, with its spin-off channel becoming known as Time Warner Cable SportsChannel 2; at that time, it adopted a logo similar to that implemented by Time Warner Cable SportsNet in Los Angeles when it launched the year prior.

=== Spectrum Sports Kansas City: 2016–2023 ===
Following the provider's acquisition of Time Warner Cable in May 2016, the Time Warner Cable SportsChannel services were rebranded under the Spectrum Sports banner in September 2016, as part of Charter's phaseout of the TWC brand.

The channel's weekly fantasy football program Fantasy Huddle is also distributed to other Charter Spectrum systems formerly operated by Time Warner Cable systems nationwide.

=== Spectrum News 1 Kansas City: 2023–present ===
In September 2023, the channel was relaunched as Spectrum News 1 Kansas City, adding local and national news programming to the existing sports coverage. During the day, local news headlines are aired every 30 minutes supplemented by news from Spectrum News+, Spectrum's national channel offering curated coverage from its local news channels.

== Programming ==
On June 26, 2013, KU Athletics, IMG College and Time Warner Cable Sports announced that TWC would broadcast live coverage of the University of Kansas events. This includes the football, men's basketball, women's basketball, volleyball, baseball, softball, soccer and the track and field events.

=== Notable current on–air staff ===
- Richard Baldinger – football analyst
- Danan Hughes – football analyst
- Brian McRae – baseball analyst
- Jayice Pearson – football analyst

=== Notable former on–air staff ===
- Danyelle Sargent – anchor/reporter (2002–2004)
