= Spectrum News 1 Central New York =

- Country: United States
- Broadcast area: Central New York
- Network: Spectrum News
- Headquarters: Syracuse, New York

Programming
- Language: English
- Picture format: 1080i (HDTV)

Ownership
- Owner: Charter Communications
- Sister channels: Spectrum News Rochester; Spectrum News Capital Region; Spectrum News Buffalo; NY1; Spectrum News Austin; Spectrum News North Carolina

History
- Launched: November 7, 2003; 23 years ago
- Former names: News 10 Now (2003–2010); YNN Central New York (2010–2013); Time Warner Cable News Central New York (2013–2016); Spectrum News Central New York (2016-2021)

Links
- Website: spectrumlocalnews.com/nys/central-ny (Central New York) spectrumlocalnews.com/nys/watertown (North Country) spectrumlocalnews.com/nys/binghamton.html (Southern Tier)

Spectrum News 1 Central New York (formerly Spectrum News Central New York and Time Warner Cable News Central New York) is an American cable news television channel owned by Charter Communications, as an affiliate of its Spectrum News slate of regional news channels. The channel provides 24-hour rolling news coverage focused primarily on central portions of upstate New York. The channel is based in downtown Syracuse, New York out of the former New York Central Railroad Passenger and Freight Station building along Interstate 690.

Spectrum News 1 Central New York maintains separate sub-feeds for the Southern Tier and the North Country regions (including the western and northern Adirondack region); it also handles production of Weather on the 1s content for its four sister channels across upstate New York (Spectrum News Rochester, Spectrum News 1 Capital Region, Spectrum News Buffalo. and Spectrum News Hudson Valley).

As with other Spectrum News channels, it is not available on satellite, nor is it available in portions of Cayuga County where Zito Media (successor to Adelphia Communications) controls the cable franchise and Charter Spectrum is not offered.

== Overview ==
Spectrum News 1 Central New York and its separate sub-feed, Spectrum News Southern Tier, are available to nearly 500,000 Spectrum subscribers in all or parts of 22 New York counties, along with portions of the Northern Tier of Pennsylvania (this makes the combined operation one of the larger regional news channels in the United States, in terms of both subscriber reach and geographic coverage area). Spectrum News Central New York/Southern Tier, Spectrum Capital Region/Hudson Valley, Spectrum News Rochester and Spectrum News Buffalo share news content with New York City-based NY1, the group's flagship regional cable news channel (which the provider carries on the digital tiers of its Upstate New York systems).

The channel was awarded a national Edward R. Murrow Award for "Best Website" in 2004. Senior reporter Bill Carey would later win a national Murrow Award for "Best Feature Reporting" in 2007, along with a New York Emmy Award in 2011 for his writing on the 2010 documentary Deadly Delusion. To date, the channel has also won seven regional Murrow Awards, and several New York State Associated Press and Syracuse Press Club awards.

== History ==
The channel was launched on November 7, 2003, as News 10 Now. It was the 11th regional news channel that was launched by Time Warner Cable. The cable provider invested a large amount of financial capital to launch the channel, including an investment of nearly $6 million to restore the former New York Central Railroad Passenger and Freight Station to serve as its base of operations. In addition to its headquarters, Spectrum News Central New York also maintains reporters and photographers based in regional newsrooms located throughout its coverage area across Central and Northern New York.

On May 25, 2005, Time Warner Cable announced that it would eliminate 30 staff positions from the channel in a cost-saving consolidation of its three regional news channels at the time in upstate New York. News 10 Now's technical production and master control operations were merged with Albany-based sister channel Capital News 9. With the move, Capital News 9 began serving as the production and studio hub for the channel's news programming, while News 10 Now began handling production responsibilities for weather forecast segments for all of its sister news channels statewide, using the channel's weather staff. Each of the channels retained their respective newsgathering crews, producers, facilities and news management.

In February 2007, News 10 Now launched a separate feed focused on Binghamton, Elmira, Corning and surrounding areas; the expansion resulted in the hiring of five reporters and a technician that would be based from newly created bureaus located in Vestal and Corning, as well as the addition of four producers at the Syracuse headquarters, who work exclusively on content for the Southern Tier feed. There are now eight staffers based in the Southern Tier, in bureaus located in Vestal and Corning.

News 10 Now's live coverage of the American Civic Association shooting in April 2009, was carried nationally by CNN. A letter from the shooter was mailed to the channel's Syracuse newsroom on the day of the shooting, and was received and reported on by News 10 Now three days later.

On February 12, 2010, Time Warner Cable announced that News 10 Now and Capital News 9 would be rebranded as "YNN" (for "Your News Now") that March, adopting the same brand that had already been in use on their sister channels in Buffalo and Rochester (the former of which was the first to adopt the "YNN" brand when it launched in March 2009).

On December 16, 2013, Time Warner Cable rebranded the channel as Time Warner Cable News Central New York (and its subfeed as Time Warner Cable News Southern Tier) as part of a branding standardization across the provider's news channels. That included the introduction of a new graphics and music package.

On September 20, 2016, with Charter Communications' acquisition of Time Warner Cable, the channels were re-branded as "Spectrum News."

On July 27, 2018, the New York Public Service Commission revoked Charter's cable franchises in the state of New York, citing failures to meet conditions imposed on the provider as part of the TWC purchase. Despite the revocation of Charter's cable franchises in New York, the future fate of Spectrum News in Central New York after Spectrum's exit from New York State is currently unknown.

Just before the end of 2020, during the region’s most serious surge of COVID-19, Spectrum laid off an undisclosed but significant number of its local news staff, including founding news director Ron Lombard, anchors Tammy Palmer and Iris St. Meren, and longtime photographer Tom Walters among others. The remaining staff was asked to record news reports on their mobile devices and anchoring was done from Albany.

In 2021, the channel was renamed to Spectrum News 1 Central New York.
