= Spectrum News 1 Austin =

- Country: United States
- Broadcast area: Austin, Waco, Fredericksburg and San Antonio, Texas
- Headquarters: Austin, Texas

Programming
- Language: English
- Picture format: 1080i (HDTV); 480i (SDTV)

Ownership
- Owner: Charter Communications
- Sister channels: NY1; Spectrum News Buffalo; Spectrum News Central New York; Spectrum News Capital Region; Spectrum News Rochester; Spectrum News North Carolina

History
- Launched: September 13, 1999; 27 years ago
- Former names: News 8 Austin (1999–2011); YNN Austin (2011–2013); Time Warner Cable News Austin (2013–2016); Spectrum News Austin (2016-2020)

Links
- Website: www.spectrumnews1.com/tx/austin.html (Austin) www.spectrumnews1.com/tx/san-antonio.html (San Antonio)

Spectrum News 1 Austin (formerly Spectrum News Austin, Time Warner Cable News Austin, YNN Austin, and News 8 Austin) is an American cable news television channel owned by Charter Communications. The channel provides 24-hour rolling news coverage focused primarily on Central Texas. While its main feed serves the Austin metropolitan area, it also maintains sub-feeds for San Antonio and Waco.

The channel's studios are located at 1708 Colorado Street in Austin, just north of the Texas State Capitol and immediately south of the main campus of the University of Texas. It is available only to Spectrum Cable subscribers within the provider's Central Texas division, which includes Austin, San Marcos, Round Rock, Temple, Killeen and Waco.

== Background ==
The channel was launched on September 13, 1999 as News 8 Austin. The channel changed its name to YNN Austin (for "Your News Now") on January 10, 2011, as part of gradual transition to a uniform brand for most of Time Warner Cable's other regional news channels that originated the year prior on its Buffalo and Rochester news channels in New York.

On December 16, 2013, at 5 a.m., the channel once again rebranded, this time as Time Warner Cable News Austin as part of a new rebranding attempt to standardize channels across the provider's news channels that included the introduction of a new graphics and music package.

On March 11, 2014, Time Warner Cable announced a second attempt to launch a regional news channel for the San Antonio market by launching a subfeed, Time Warner Cable News San Antonio. (News 9 San Antonio was the first attempt by TWC in 2003-2004.) It would operate out of TWCN Austin's headquarters and share managerial staff, with reports being filed for cablecast by San Antonio-based multi-platform reporters in a separate bureau that was established in that city. It was soft-launched on April 8, with a series of weeknight preview broadcasts of two programs airing on the channel (the political discussion program Capital Tonight and the sports highlight program Sports Night) that began. The feed formally launched on June 2, 2014. Plans call for the future hirings of additional journalists based in San Antonio.

On September 20, 2016, it was announced that all TWC News channels would be rebranded as Spectrum News months after Charter acquired Time Warner Cable earlier in the year.

On October 6, 2020, Charter announced it would expand Spectrum News Austin into a statewide news channel—under the Spectrum News 1 brand—serving all Spectrum markets in Texas (including Dallas–Fort Worth, Wichita Falls, El Paso, Corpus Christi, Waco and Harlingen–McAllen–Brownsville) beginning on October 16. In addition to its existing Austin and San Antonio-based staff, the channel will also maintain an expanded staff of reporters—totaling nearly two dozen—in communities that Spectrum News 1 where plans to expand its coverage.

== Programming ==
The channel operates on a news "wheel" format, offering a mix of live and taped news segments heavily focused on the Austin metropolitan area. It also provides traffic reports on weekday mornings and afternoons; as well as sports segments nightly. Producers update the wheel throughout the day, inserting new material as stories are filed and updated information becomes available. In addition to running regular weather segments every 10 minutes "on the 1's", the channel also provides wall-to-wall severe weather coverage whenever tornado and severe thunderstorm warnings are in effect for any part of viewing area of Spectrum News 1 Austin or its subfeeds.

Without different limitations faced by broadcast television stations due to network and programming commitments, Spectrum News Austin is known in the area for its taped coverage of community news. The channel typically does not report on stories or events relating to crime and scandal. The channel is also distinct from traditional television news operations in that its cablecasts are traditionally anchored by a single presenter. Its reporters occasionally set up, shoot and edit their own stories without the assistance of a photojournalist (a format known as videojournalism).
