= 2004 United States presidential election in New York =

- November 2, 2004
- Turnout: 62.44% (▲1.74 pp)

| Nominee | John Kerry | George W. Bush |
| Party | Democratic | Republican |
| Alliance | Working Families | Conservative |
| Home state | Massachusetts | Texas |
| Running mate | John Edwards | Dick Cheney |
| Electoral vote | 31 | 0 |
| Popular vote | 4,314,280 | 2,962,567 |
| Percentage | 58.37% | 40.08% |

Kerry
40–50%
50–60%
60–70%
70–80%
80–90%
Bush
40–50%
50–60%
60–70%
70–80%
80–90%
President before election
George W. Bush
Republican
Elected President
George W. Bush
Republican

The 2004 United States presidential election in New York took place on November 2, 2004, and was part of the 2004 United States presidential election. Voters chose 31 representatives, or electors to the Electoral College, who voted for president and vice president.

New York was won by Democratic nominee John Kerry by an 18.3% margin of victory. Prior to the election, all major news organizations considered this a state Kerry would win, or a safe blue state. The last Republican presidential nominee to have carried the state of New York was Ronald Reagan in 1984 and the last one to finish within single digits of the Democratic opponent was Bush's father George H. W. Bush in 1988.

As expected, Kerry won the state of New York in a landslide. Statewide elections in New York are dominated by the heavily Democratic stronghold of New York City, the most populous city in the United States where around 40% of state residents live. Kerry received around 75% of the vote in the city, accounting for most of his statewide victory. New York gave Kerry his fourth largest statewide margin of victory, only behind Kerry's home state of Massachusetts and fellow New England states Rhode Island and Vermont.

Although the state was left uncontested by both candidates, Bush did manage to significantly improve on his performance from 2000, reducing his margin of defeat from 25% to 18%; this is often attributed to increased support for Bush in the aftermath of the 9/11 attacks and a greater emphasis on the issue of counterterrorism.

After 2004, no Republican presidential candidate would receive over 40% of the state's vote until 2024, when Donald Trump won 43.3%. Likewise, no Republican would carry Rockland County until Trump in 2024.

George W. Bush remains the last Republican candidate to win Dutchess County. Bush was also the first president elected twice without ever carrying New York.

== Primaries ==
- 2004 New York Democratic presidential primary

== Campaign ==
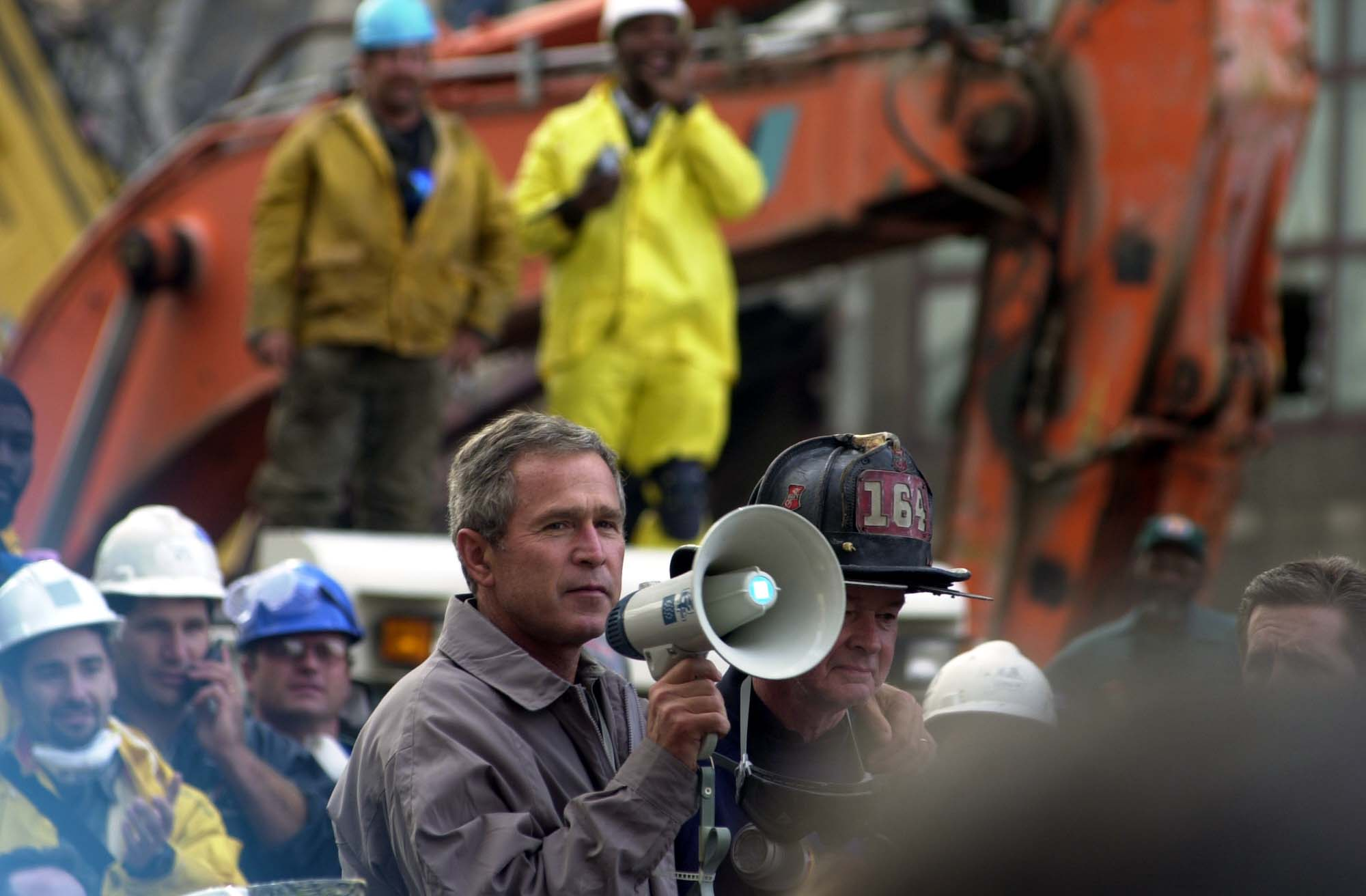
President George W. Bush at Ground Zero, 2001.

=== Predictions ===
There were 12 news organizations who made state-by-state predictions of the election. Here are their last predictions before election day.

| Source | Ranking |
|---|---|
| D.C. Political Report | Solid D |
| Cook Political Report | Solid D |
| Research 2000 | Solid D |
| Zogby International | Likely D |
| Washington Post | Likely D |
| Washington Dispatch | Likely D |
| Washington Times | Solid D |
| The New York Times | Solid D |
| CNN | Likely D |
| Newsweek | Solid D |
| Associated Press | Solid D |
| Rasmussen Reports | Likely D |

=== Polling ===
Kerry won every single pre-election poll, and all but one with a double-digit margin and with at least 49%. The final 3-poll average showed Kerry leading 55% to 38%.

=== Fundraising ===
Bush raised $11,994,227. Kerry raised $27,733,309.

=== Advertising and visits ===
Neither campaign advertised or visited the state during the fall campaign.

== Analysis ==
The voters of the five boroughs of New York City were the main force responsible for Kerry's decisive victory in the state. Kerry won New York City by an overwhelming margin, taking 1,828,015 votes to Bush's 587,534, a 74.99%-to-24.10% victory. Excluding New York City's votes, John Kerry still would have carried New York State, but by a reduced margin, taking 2,486,265 votes to Bush's 2,375,033 votes, a 51.14%-to-48.86% victory.

The New York City suburbs consist of Long Island's Nassau and Suffolk counties as well as Westchester and Rockland counties. Traditionally Republican, this area went clearly Democratic through the past few decades, with the arrival of people from New York City. However, in this area where many voters commute to Manhattan, Bush did better than expected. Although he clearly lost these counties to Gore in 2000 with 39.55% to 56.42%, or 655,665 votes to 935,456, he only lost them by a closer 46.13% to 52.30% to Kerry. While Bush won 167,397 more votes than in 2000, Kerry lost 2,437. This can be mainly explained by the concerns of suburban moderate voters about terrorism, an issue about which they trusted Bush more than Kerry. Exit polls showed 49% of voters in New York trusted Bush to handle terrorism, as opposed to 42% for Kerry.

Upstate New York region, including all of the counties that are not part of New York City or its suburbs, is the least liberal region of the three. Its politics are very similar to those of Ohio or Pennsylvania, at the time, both key swing states and sharing conservative rural areas. Bush expanded his margin in New York City's northern exurban counties Dutchess, Orange and Putnam from 2000. Despite this, Senator Kerry still managed a slim victory in Upstate New York, with 1,553,246 votes to 1,551,971 for Bush. This was largely due to a Democratic tidal wave in the region's four largest cities--Buffalo, Rochester, Syracuse and Albany. Kerry also ran strongly in college dominated Tompkins County and two counties with an influx of former New York City residents moving to vacation homes, Ulster County and Columbia County.

According to exit polls, Senator Kerry won both males (56%–42%) and Females (60%–40%) over the president. President Bush narrowly carried white voters in New York 50% to 49%. This was not enough to overcome Senator Kerry carrying African Americans 90% to 9%, Latinos 75% to 24% and Asians 72% to 27%. Kerry won all age groups over President Bush, with his closest wins being 52% to 47% among those aged 45–59 and 53% to 47% among those 60 and older. Kerry also won all income groups and all levels of education.

== Results ==
2004 United States presidential election in New York
| Party | Candidate | Popular votes | Percentage | Electoral votes |
|---|---|---|---|---|
| Democratic | John Kerry | 4,180,755 | 56.57% | |
| Working Families | John Kerry | 133,525 | 1.81% | |
| Total | John F. Kerry | 4,314,280 | 58.37% | 31 |
| Republican | George W. Bush | 2,806,993 | 37.98% | |
| Conservative | George W. Bush | 155,574 | 2.10% | |
| Total | George W. Bush (incumbent) | 2,962,567 | 40.08% | 0 |
| Independence | Ralph Nader | 84,247 | 1.14% | |
| Peace and Justice | Ralph Nader | 15,626 | 0.21% | |
| Total | Ralph Nader | 99,873 | 1.35% | 0 |
| Libertarian | Michael Badnarik | 11,607 | 0.16% | 0 |
| Socialist Workers | Roger Calero | 2,405 | 0.03% | 0 |
| Constitution (write-in) | Michael Peroutka | 363 | <0.01% | 0 |
| Green (write-in) | David Cobb | 138 | <0.01% | 0 |
| Independent (write-in) | John J. Kennedy | 8 | <0.01% | 0 |
| Independent (write-in) | Michael Halpin | 4 | <0.01% | 0 |
| Socialist Equality (write-in) | Bill Van Auken | 4 | <0.01% | 0 |
| Totals | | 7,391,036 | 100% | 31 |
| Voter turnout: | | | | 62.44% |

=== New York City results ===
| 2004 presidential election in New York City | | Manhattan | The Bronx | Brooklyn | Queens | Staten Island | Total | |
| Democratic- Working Families | John F. Kerry | 526,765 | 283,994 | 514,973 | 433,835 | 68,448 | 1,828,015 | 74.97% |
| Democratic- Working Families | John F. Kerry | 82.06% | 82.80% | 74.86% | 71.66% | 42.74% | 1,828,015 | 74.97% |
| Republican- Conservative | George W. Bush | 107,405 | 56,701 | 167,149 | 165,954 | 90,325 | 587,534 | 24.10% |
| Republican- Conservative | George W. Bush | 16.73% | 16.53% | 24.30% | 27.41% | 56.40% | 587,534 | 24.10% |
| Independence- Peace and Justice | Ralph Nader | 6,023 | 1,973 | 4,859 | 4,535 | 1,190 | 18,580 | 0.76% |
| Independence- Peace and Justice | Ralph Nader | 0.94% | 0.58% | 0.71% | 0.75% | 0.74% | 18,580 | 0.76% |
| Libertarian | Michael Badnarik | 1,276 | 140 | 570 | 561 | 134 | 2,007 | 0.11% |
| Libertarian | Michael Badnarik | 0.20% | 0.04% | 0.08% | 0.09% | 0.08% | 2,007 | 0.11% |
| Socialist Workers | Roger Calero | 278 | 121 | 229 | 177 | 29 | 834 | 0.03% |
| Socialist Workers | Roger Calero | 0.04% | 0.04% | 0.03% | 0.03% | 0.02% | 834 | 0.03% |
| Others | | 204 | 50 | 104 | 330 | 17 | 371 | 0.02% |
| Others | | 0.03% | 0.01% | 0.02% | 0.05% | 0.01% | 371 | 0.02% |
| TOTAL | | 641,951 | 342,979 | 687,884 | 605,392 | 160,143 | 2,438,349 | 100.00% |

=== By county ===
| County | John Kerry Democratic | | George W. Bush Republican | | Various candidates Other parties | | Margin | | Total votes cast |
| County | # | % | # | % | # | % | # | % | Total votes cast |
|---|---|---|---|---|---|---|---|---|---|
| Albany | 89,323 | 60.68% | 54,872 | 37.28% | 3,004 | 2.04% | 34,451 | 23.40% | 147,199 |
| Allegany | 6,566 | 34.07% | 12,310 | 63.88% | 394 | 2.05% | −5,744 | −29.81% | 19,270 |
| Bronx | 283,994 | 82.80% | 56,701 | 16.53% | 2,284 | 0.67% | 227,293 | 66.27% | 342,979 |
| Broome | 46,281 | 50.37% | 43,568 | 47.41% | 2,041 | 2.22% | 2,713 | 2.96% | 91,890 |
| Cattaraugus | 13,514 | 39.44% | 20,051 | 58.52% | 701 | 2.04% | −6,537 | −19.08% | 34,266 |
| Cayuga | 17,534 | 48.64% | 17,743 | 49.22% | 775 | 2.15% | −209 | −0.58% | 36,052 |
| Chautauqua | 27,257 | 44.72% | 32,434 | 53.22% | 1,253 | 2.06% | −5,177 | −8.50% | 60,944 |
| Chemung | 17,080 | 43.71% | 21,321 | 54.56% | 674 | 1.72% | −4,241 | −10.85% | 39,075 |
| Chenango | 9,277 | 43.47% | 11,582 | 54.27% | 482 | 2.26% | −2,305 | −10.80% | 21,341 |
| Clinton | 17,624 | 52.24% | 15,330 | 45.44% | 782 | 2.32% | 2,294 | 6.80% | 33,736 |
| Columbia | 15,929 | 51.21% | 14,457 | 46.48% | 717 | 2.31% | 1,472 | 4.73% | 31,103 |
| Cortland | 10,670 | 46.88% | 11,613 | 51.02% | 477 | 2.09% | −943 | −4.14% | 22,760 |
| Delaware | 8,724 | 41.22% | 11,958 | 56.49% | 485 | 2.29% | −3,234 | −15.27% | 21,167 |
| Dutchess | 58,232 | 47.01% | 63,372 | 51.16% | 2,277 | 1.84% | −5,140 | −4.15% | 123,881 |
| Erie | 251,090 | 56.41% | 184,423 | 41.43% | 9,625 | 2.17% | 66,667 | 14.98% | 445,138 |
| Essex | 8,768 | 45.95% | 9,869 | 51.72% | 445 | 2.34% | −1,101 | −5.77% | 19,082 |
| Franklin | 9,543 | 52.10% | 8,383 | 45.77% | 390 | 2.13% | 1,160 | 6.33% | 18,316 |
| Fulton | 9,202 | 41.42% | 12,570 | 56.58% | 443 | 1.99% | −3,368 | −15.16% | 22,215 |
| Genesee | 10,331 | 37.46% | 16,725 | 60.64% | 524 | 1.90% | −6,394 | −23.18% | 27,580 |
| Greene | 8,933 | 39.88% | 12,996 | 58.02% | 469 | 2.10% | −4,063 | −18.14% | 22,398 |
| Hamilton | 1,145 | 30.99% | 2,475 | 66.98% | 75 | 2.03% | −1,330 | −35.99% | 3,695 |
| Herkimer | 11,675 | 41.24% | 16,024 | 56.60% | 611 | 2.15% | −4,349 | −15.36% | 28,310 |
| Jefferson | 16,860 | 43.45% | 21,231 | 54.72% | 709 | 1.83% | −4,371 | −11.27% | 38,800 |
| Kings | 514,973 | 74.86% | 167,149 | 24.30% | 5,762 | 0.84% | 347,824 | 50.56% | 687,884 |
| Lewis | 4,546 | 39.89% | 6,624 | 58.12% | 227 | 1.99% | −2,078 | −18.23% | 11,397 |
| Livingston | 11,504 | 38.41% | 17,729 | 59.20% | 715 | 2.39% | −6,225 | −20.79% | 29,948 |
| Madison | 13,121 | 43.32% | 16,537 | 54.60% | 629 | 2.08% | −3,416 | −11.28% | 30,287 |
| Monroe | 173,497 | 50.57% | 163,545 | 47.67% | 6,022 | 1.76% | 9,952 | 2.90% | 343,064 |
| Montgomery | 9,449 | 44.53% | 11,338 | 53.43% | 434 | 2.04% | −1,889 | −8.90% | 21,221 |
| Nassau | 323,070 | 52.25% | 288,355 | 46.63% | 6,918 | 1.12% | 34,715 | 5.62% | 618,343 |
| New York | 526,765 | 82.06% | 107,405 | 16.73% | 7,781 | 1.21% | 419,360 | 65.33% | 641,951 |
| Niagara | 47,602 | 49.29% | 47,111 | 48.78% | 1,867 | 1.93% | 491 | 0.51% | 96,580 |
| Oneida | 40,792 | 42.77% | 52,392 | 54.93% | 2,197 | 2.30% | −11,600 | −12.16% | 95,381 |
| Onondaga | 116,381 | 54.23% | 94,006 | 43.80% | 4,238 | 1.98% | 22,375 | 10.43% | 214,625 |
| Ontario | 21,166 | 42.24% | 27,999 | 55.88% | 945 | 1.89% | −6,833 | −13.64% | 50,110 |
| Orange | 63,394 | 43.82% | 79,089 | 54.67% | 2,190 | 1.51% | −15,695 | −10.85% | 144,673 |
| Orleans | 5,959 | 35.95% | 10,317 | 62.24% | 301 | 1.81% | −4,358 | −26.29% | 16,577 |
| Oswego | 24,133 | 46.76% | 26,325 | 51.01% | 1,149 | 2.23% | −2,192 | −4.25% | 51,607 |
| Otsego | 12,723 | 47.74% | 13,342 | 50.06% | 587 | 2.20% | −619 | −2.32% | 26,652 |
| Putnam | 19,575 | 42.03% | 26,356 | 56.59% | 640 | 1.37% | −6,781 | −14.56% | 46,571 |
| Queens | 433,835 | 71.66% | 165,954 | 27.41% | 5,603 | 0.93% | 267,881 | 44.25% | 605,392 |
| Rensselaer | 36,075 | 49.75% | 34,734 | 47.90% | 1,705 | 2.35% | 1,341 | 1.85% | 72,514 |
| Richmond | 68,448 | 42.74% | 90,325 | 56.40% | 1,370 | 0.85% | −21,877 | −13.66% | 160,143 |
| Rockland | 64,191 | 48.91% | 65,130 | 49.63% | 1,910 | 1.46% | −939 | −0.72% | 131,231 |
| Saratoga | 48,730 | 45.60% | 56,158 | 52.55% | 1,985 | 1.86% | −7,428 | −6.95% | 106,873 |
| Schenectady | 35,971 | 51.78% | 32,066 | 46.16% | 1,432 | 2.06% | 3,905 | 5.62% | 69,469 |
| Schoharie | 5,630 | 38.67% | 8,591 | 59.01% | 338 | 2.33% | −2,961 | −20.34% | 14,559 |
| Schuyler | 3,445 | 40.10% | 4,960 | 57.74% | 185 | 2.16% | −1,515 | −17.64% | 8,590 |
| Seneca | 6,979 | 45.54% | 7,981 | 52.08% | 365 | 2.38% | −1,002 | −6.54% | 15,325 |
| St. Lawrence | 22,857 | 54.73% | 18,029 | 43.17% | 875 | 2.09% | 4,828 | 11.56% | 41,761 |
| Steuben | 14,523 | 34.35% | 26,980 | 63.81% | 781 | 1.85% | −12,457 | −29.46% | 42,284 |
| Suffolk | 315,909 | 49.46% | 309,949 | 48.53% | 12,854 | 2.01% | 5,960 | 0.93% | 638,712 |
| Sullivan | 15,034 | 48.55% | 15,319 | 49.47% | 613 | 1.98% | −285 | −0.92% | 30,966 |
| Tioga | 9,694 | 40.56% | 13,762 | 57.58% | 446 | 1.87% | −4,068 | −17.02% | 23,902 |
| Tompkins | 27,229 | 64.19% | 13,994 | 32.99% | 1,198 | 2.82% | 13,235 | 31.20% | 42,421 |
| Ulster | 47,602 | 54.27% | 37,821 | 43.12% | 2,289 | 2.61% | 9,781 | 11.15% | 87,712 |
| Warren | 13,405 | 43.16% | 16,969 | 54.63% | 685 | 2.20% | −3,564 | −11.47% | 31,059 |
| Washington | 10,624 | 42.32% | 13,827 | 55.08% | 652 | 2.59% | −3,203 | −12.76% | 25,103 |
| Wayne | 15,709 | 38.11% | 24,709 | 59.94% | 802 | 1.94% | −9,000 | −21.83% | 41,220 |
| Westchester | 229,849 | 58.08% | 159,628 | 40.33% | 6,293 | 1.59% | 70,221 | 17.75% | 395,770 |
| Wyoming | 6,134 | 33.76% | 11,745 | 64.64% | 290 | 1.59% | −5,611 | −30.88% | 18,169 |
| Yates | 4,205 | 39.26% | 6,309 | 58.90% | 197 | 1.83% | −2,104 | −19.64% | 10,711 |
| Totals | 4,314,280 | 58.36% | 2,962,567 | 40.08% | 115,107 | 1.56% | 1,351,713 | 18.28% | 7,391,954 |

==== Counties that flipped from Democratic to Republican ====
- Cayuga (county seat: Auburn)
- Montgomery (county seat: Fonda)
- Richmond (coterminous with Staten Island, a borough of New York City)
- Rockland (county seat: New City)
- Seneca (county seat: Waterloo)
- Sullivan (county seat: Monticello)

=== By congressional district ===
Kerry won 20 of 29 congressional districts. Both candidates won a district held by the other party.

| District | Bush | Kerry | Representative |
|---|---|---|---|
| 1st | 49.4% | 48.7% | Tim Bishop |
| 2nd | 45% | 53% | Steve Israel |
| 3rd | 52% | 47% | Peter T. King |
| 4th | 44% | 55% | Carolyn McCarthy |
| 5th | 36% | 63% | Gary Ackerman |
| 6th | 15% | 84% | Gregory W. Meeks |
| 7th | 25% | 74% | Joseph Crowley |
| 8th | 27% | 72% | Jerrold Nadler |
| 9th | 43% | 56% | Anthony D. Weiner |
| 10th | 13% | 86% | Edolphus Towns |
| 11th | 13% | 86% | Major Owens |
| 12th | 19% | 80% | Nydia Velasquez |
| 13th | 55% | 45% | Vito Fossella |
| 14th | 24% | 74% | Carolyn B. Maloney |
| 15th | 9% | 90% | Charlie Rangel |
| 16th | 10% | 89% | Jose Serrano |
| 17th | 33% | 66% | Eliot L. Engel |
| 18th | 42% | 57% | Nita Lowey |
| 19th | 53% | 45% | Sue W. Kelly |
| 20th | 53% | 45% | John E. Sweeney |
| 21st | 43% | 55% | Michael R. McNulty |
| 22nd | 45% | 53% | Maurice Hinchey |
| 23rd | 51% | 47% | John M. McHugh |
| 24th | 52% | 46% | Sherwood Boehlert |
| 25th | 48% | 50% | James T. Walsh |
| 26th | 55% | 43% | Thomas M. Reynolds |
| 27th | 44% | 53% | Jack Quinn |
| 27th | 44% | 53% | Brian Higgins |
| 28th | 36% | 62% | Louise Slaughter |
| 29th | 56% | 42% | Amo Houghton |
| 29th | 56% | 42% | Randy Kuhl |

== Electors ==
NY voters cast their ballots for electors: representatives to the Electoral College. New York has 31 electors because it has 29 congressional districts and 2 senators. All candidates who appear on the ballot or qualify to receive write-in votes must submit a list of 31 electors, who pledge to vote for their candidate and his or her running mate. Whoever wins the majority of votes in the state is awarded all 31 electoral votes. Their chosen electors then vote for president and vice president. Although electors are pledged to their candidate and running mate, they are not obligated to vote for them. An elector who votes for someone other than his or her candidate is known as a faithless elector.

The electors of each state and the District of Columbia met on December 13, 2004, to cast their votes for president and vice president. The Electoral College itself never meets as one body. Instead the electors from each state and the District of Columbia meet in their respective capitols.

The following were the members of the Electoral College from New York. All were pledged to and voted for Kerry/Edwards.

1. Joseph Ashton
2. Bill De Blasio
3. Molly Clifford
4. Lorraine Cortes-Vazquez
5. Inez Dickens
6. Danny Donahue
7. Herman D. Farrell
8. C. Virginia Fields
9. Emily Giske
10. Bea Gonzalez
11. Alan Hevesi
12. Frank Hoare
13. Virginia Kee
14. Peggy Kerry
15. Denise King
16. Len Lenihan
17. Bertha Lewis
18. Alan Lubin
19. Thomas J. Manton
20. Dennis Mehiel
21. June O'Neill
22. David Paterson
23. Jose Rivera
24. Rich Schaffer
25. Chung Seto
26. Sheldon Silver
27. Eliot Spitzer
28. Antoine Thompson
29. Paul Tokasz
30. Bill Wood
31. Robert Zimmerman

== See also ==
- United States presidential elections in New York
- Presidency of George W. Bush
