= Gerson Borrero =

Puerto Rican journalist, radio host, and TV political commentator

- Born: Ponce, Puerto Rico
- Citizenship: U.S.
- Occupations: Journalist, TV Personality, Radio Host
- Spouse: Ruth Noemí Colón
- Writing career
- Language: English, Spanish
- Notable awards: National Hispanic Media Coalition "Excellence in Broadcast Journalism" Award (2017) Heavy 100 list of "Most Important Radio Hosts" (2002) Hispanic Media Award Achievement in Radio (2001) Best Hispanic on Air Personality (2000) Best Talk Radio Program GLOBO Award (1999)

Gerson Borrero is an American journalist, radio host, and TV political commentator. Among other posts, he has been editor-at-large of City & State NY and editor-in-chief of El Diario/La Prensa, the largest Spanish-language newspaper in New York City.

In addition to his print reporting, Borrero has been a New York City radio host for over two decades. He currently appears on the popular TV news show Political Rundown on New York 1, with Errol Louis and WABC Radio's Curtis Sliwa.

== Early years ==
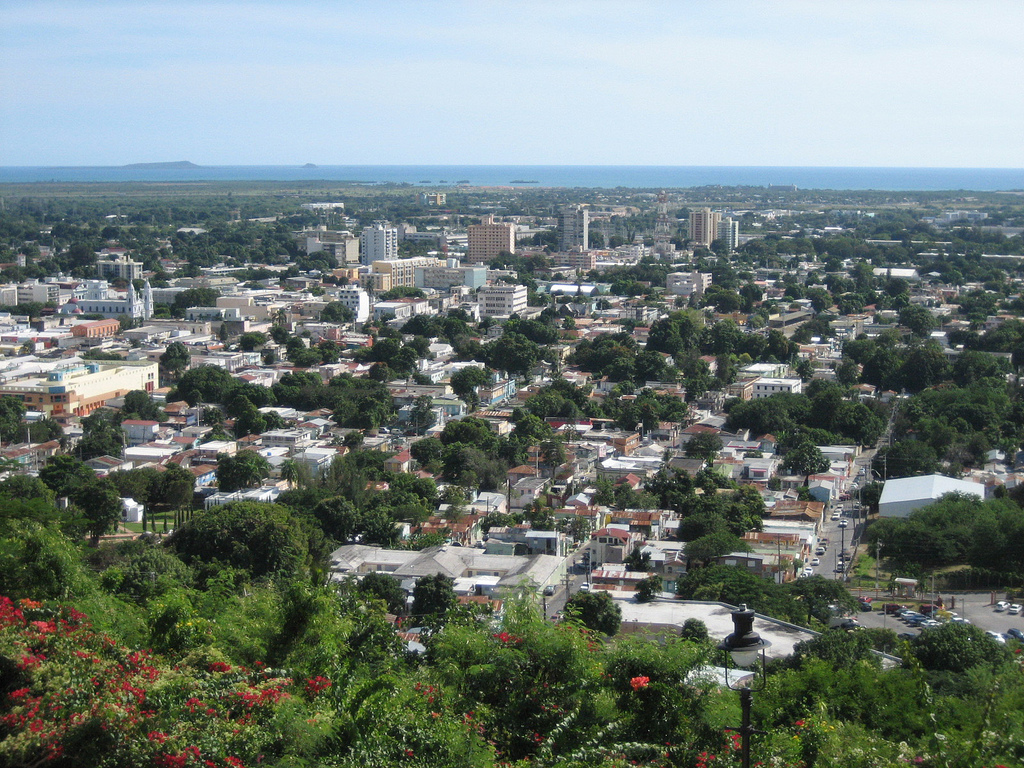
Ponce, Puerto Rico, with the Caribbean Sea in the background

Borrero was born in 1950 in Ponce, Puerto Rico, and came to New York City at age 4.

He and his brother were raised by their single mother, Noelia Maldonado, who worked at a jewelry factory and sold Avon and home cleaning products.

Growing up in the Bronx, Borrero was argumentative in school. He disagreed with his teachers frequently and vehemently. To this day, Borrero "wonders how he managed to get good grades."

Borrero's "notorious candor" got him in trouble with an elementary schoolteacher. The teacher pulled his ears and dug her nails into them, which prompted Borrero to throw a milk tray at her. At this point, Borrero's mother sent him back to Puerto Rico for a few years.

In 1980, Borrero was a co-founder of the "Committee Against Fort Apache," which protested against the negative imagery and racial stereotyping of the movie Fort Apache, the Bronx.

On another occasion, Borrero led a protest when Madonna rubbed a Puerto Rican flag between her legs.

Borrero helped found the Institute for Puerto Rican Policy. He later opened a public relations firm, and helped Rep. Nydia Velázquez in her initial, and successful, run for US Congress.

His journalism career started when a friend asked him to deliver occasional commentaries for a local Spanish-language TV station, and he discovered that "there was a market for his belligerence." In 1995, Borrero began writing full-time for El Diario/La Prensa, the largest Spanish-language newspaper in New York City.

== Journalism ==
Borrero's journalism has covered a broad spectrum of New York City life: particularly in the areas of government and politics.

External videos
- Borrero receives the 2017 "Excellence in Broadcast Journalism" Award from the National Hispanic Media Coalition

In 1996 he landed a column called Bajo Fuego ("Under Fire") in El Diario/La Prensa. In announcing this new column, El Diario publisher Rossana Rosado declared that Borrero understood the city in a way that the paper's Latin America-trained reporters did not.

For nineteen years, from 1995 through 2014, Bajo Fuego was published thrice weekly in El Diario/La Prensa. The column won several awards for its in-depth research, and its unique perspective on Latino life in New York.

For three years, from 2000 through 2003, Borrero also served as editor-in-chief of El Diario.

== Radio ==
External audio
- Gerson Borrero on WNYC Radio, discussing How the Power 100 Affect You

Borrero's Bajo Fuego column caught the attention of Radio WADO's management in New York City. They gave Borrero a sprawling three hours-per day, five days per week, talk show. New Yorkers enjoyed his brash, dramatic style of reporting and interviewing - and according to Arbitron ratings, the show's audience grew to 165,000 a week. "He's a very popular guy. He could make you, and he could break you," said New York State Senator Rubén Díaz Sr., who is also the father of Bronx Borough President Rubén Díaz Jr.

The show ran until 2001, and Borrero continued as a radio broadcaster for over twenty years.

He is also a frequent guest on the Brian Lehrer Show on WNYC.

== Television ==
External videos
- Gerson Borrero and Curtis Sliwa kick off the first Political Rundown of 2018, with Errol Louis moderating
- Political Rundown on New York 1, with Gerson Borrero, Curtis Sliwa and Errol Louis

Borrero is a political commentator for New York 1.

For over a decade he has appeared with WABC Radio's Curtis Sliwa on a weekly show, as part of the Time Warner Cable News program, Inside City Hall.

This show, Political Rundown, features Borrero and Sliwa squaring off over the week's top local, state and national news stories.

The segment, which airs each Wednesday and is moderated by political anchor Errol Louis, has been reported as a “must see” in New York political circles.

Borrero also appears as a cultural and political commentator on the Spanish-language channel of Time Warner/Spectrum. The program is called Para Que Lo Sepas, and the TV channel is NY1 Noticias, a division of the Time Warner NY1 channel.

== HITN ==
HITN (Hispanic International Television Network) is the largest Latino public broadcaster in the United States.

In 2016, Borrero hosted a twelve-part educational TV series for HITN called Tu Momento 21016. The twelve informational videos, all hosted by Borrero, provided a detailed yet easy-to-understand overview of the entire U.S. presidential electoral process - from candidacy to inauguration day. In this manner, from April through Election Day 2016, Borrero and HITN encouraged U.S. voter participation by educating the Spanish-speaking community, nationwide, about the complex U.S. electoral system.

Currently, Borrero conducts a weekly interview series for HITN called Estudio DC con Gerson Borrero. It focuses on national political figures and Latino cultural leaders.

== Honors and awards ==
- Best Talk Radio Program GLOBO Award (1999)
- Best Hispanic on Air Personality (2000)
- Hispanic Media Award Achievement in Radio (2001)
- Heavy 100 list of "Most Important Radio Hosts" (2002)
- National Hispanic Media Coalition "Excellence in Broadcast Journalism" Award (2017)

== Family life ==
Borrero is married to Ruth Noemí Colón, an attorney who was the 66th Secretary of State of New York.

Borrero has two adult children - Taína, 38, and Gerson Felipe, 24.

== See also ==
- Puerto Rican literature
- List of Puerto Rican writers
- New York City Council
- New York State Legislature
- Puerto Rican Day Parade
- El Diario/La Prensa
- Inside City Hall
