= Roma Torre =

American journalist

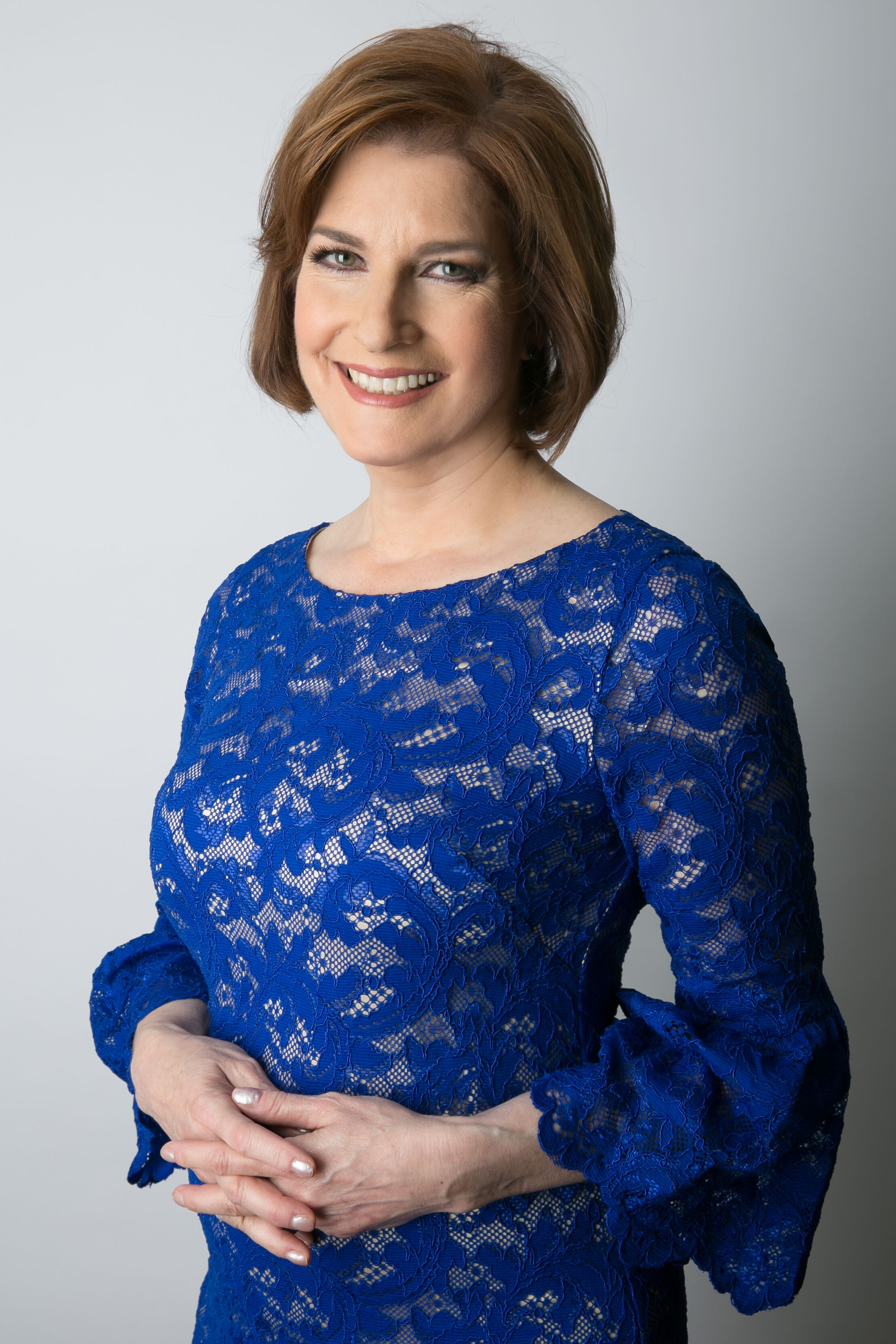
- Roma Torre in April 2020
- Born: Roma Torre Friedman; April 20, 1958 (age 68); New York, New York
- Education: Tufts University (B.A.)
- Occupations: Journalist, Theater Critic
- Children: 2
- Parent(s): Harold W. Friedman; Marie Torre
- Writing career
- Notable awards: 2019 NATAS Silver Circle, 2019 and 1991 Emmy Awards, Newswomen’s Club of New York's 2003 Peggy Award

Roma Torre (born April 20, 1958) is an American TV journalist and theater critic. She is best known for her time at cable news channel NY1, where she was a lead news presenter for over 28 years.

Torre previously served as an anchor for NY1’s morning news, the station’s political news program “Inside City Hall”, and more recently "Your News Live at Noon". She has also co-anchored the inaugural ceremonies at City Hall Plaza and co-hosted the Tony Awards.

Torre and four others departed NY1 in December 2020 following a settlement in an age and gender discrimination lawsuit against Charter Communications.

== Career ==
Torre began her career at WCBS-TV as a news writer and producer. She also spent 5 years at News 12 Long Island. In 1992, NY1 was founded and she became the news anchor for "News All Day", appearing in the daytime newscasts. Torre had taken up different roles during her career with NY1, including hosting "Inside City Hall" and the theater show "On Stage".

Torre has received over 30 broadcasting awards including a 2019 Emmy and a 1991 Emmy for her coverage of the Avianca plane crash disaster. She was also a recipient of the Newswomen’s Club of New York's 2003 Peggy Award for Broadcasting for her review of the Broadway show, Big River. In November 2019, she was inducted into the New York NATAS' Silver Circle for 25 years of significant contributions to New York television.

=== Lawsuit against Charter Communications ===
In June 2019, Torre and four other news presenters (Amanda Farinacci, Vivian Lee, Jeanine Ramirez and Kristen Shaughnessy) filed an age and gender discrimination lawsuit against the station's parent company, Charter Communications. The five, represented by Douglas H. Wigdor, claimed that Charter marginalized them since the company's acquisition of NY1, reducing their airtime and paying them less money than male counterparts. They also accused the company of hiring younger "literal replacements" based on their race and skin color. Torre specifically alleged that the network had given preferential treatment to male anchor Pat Kiernan, including a new studio for the morning broadcasts that she claimed she was barred from using.

Charter Communications refuted the claims, stating “We take these allegations seriously, and as we complete our thorough review, we have not found any merit to them.”

One month after filing the lawsuit, Torre criticized NY1 for alleged retaliation by refusing to allow her to cover the USWNT 2019 ticker-tape parade. “In contrast to 2015, this year NY1 has excluded me from live coverage of the celebration. This year, only weeks after we filed our lawsuit, NY1 has informed me that I will not be involved in the live parade coverage despite my request to continue in this role,” she wrote.

Torre and the other plaintiffs continued to appear on NY1 while the lawsuit was pending, but mutually agreed to depart the network following a settlement announced on December 31, 2020.

== Personal life ==
Torre is the daughter of Marie Torre, a well-known journalist who was the first to gain national attention for serving 10 days in jail after refusing to identify a news source in a dispute involving CBS and Judy Garland in Garland v. Torre.

Born in New York City, Torre grew up in Pittsburgh and aspired to be an actress. She graduated from Tufts University magna cum laude with a degree in English and history. After graduation, she founded a theater company with Eduardo Lopez whom she later married.

Roma and Ed Lopez have 2 children, Alejandro and Alegra.

Torre is a colon cancer survivor and has been an outspoken patient advocate urging early screening as the best prevention for the disease.

== Filmography ==
According to IMDb, Torre has appeared in films and TV shows as a news anchor.

Appearance
Year	Title	Form of entertainment
1996	City Hall	Film
2000	The Yards	Film
2000	Dinner Rush	Film
2001	Spin City	TV series
2001	Kate & Leopold	Film
2002	100 Centre Street	TV series
2003	Law & Order: Criminal Intent	TV series
2004	The Manchurian Candidate	Film
2004	In Good Company	Film
2008	Cloverfield	Film
2016	Custody	Film
2017	The Punisher	TV series
2022	The Batman	Film
