= Vitarelli =

Vitarelli is an Italian surname. Notable people with the surname include:

- Alicia Vitarelli, news anchor
- Cory Vitarelli, lacrosse player
- William Vitarelli, educator and architect

== See also ==
- Joe Viterelli, actor
