= Marie Torre =

Marie Torre (born Torregrossa; June 17, 1924, Brooklyn, New York – January 3, 1997) was a television personality who appeared on KDKA-TV, Pittsburgh, Pennsylvania from 1962 to 1977. She was the station's first woman anchor and one of the first female anchors in the United States. She showed great versatility, easily moving from covering hard news stories, including the kidnapping of Peggy Ann Bradnick at Shade Gap, Pennsylvania, in May 1966, to interviewing such notables and newsmakers as President Lyndon B. Johnson and Coretta Scott King.

== Career ==
Torre hosted a daily interview talk show, Contact, later renamed The Marie Torre Show, as well as public affairs programming on KDKA-TV. She served as the station's entertainment critic, including everything from motion pictures to live theatre productions, such as the Pittsburgh Civic Light Opera.

Earlier in her career, she gained some notoriety when, as a reporter for the New York Herald Tribune, she refused to name the source of comments critical of actress Judy Garland. During a landmark court case, Garland v. Torre, Torre was sentenced to 10 days imprisonment for contempt of court.

She appeared three times on the children's show, Mister Rogers' Neighborhood.

After 1977, Marie Torre returned to New York City.

== Honors and legacy ==
Carlow University in Pittsburgh sponsors the Marie Torre Memorial Lecture Series.

== Personal life ==
Her daughter, Roma Torre, is also in the news business: she was an anchor and theater critic for New York cable news channel NY1.

== See also ==
- Freedom of the Press - United States
