= Dominic Carter =

Dominic Carter may refer to:

- Dominic Carter (journalist)
- Dominic Carter (actor)
