= Ruth Noemí Colón =

Puerto Rican politician

64th Secretary of State of New York
- In office September 1, 2010 – May 1, 2011
- Governor: David Paterson; Andrew Cuomo
- Preceded by: Lorraine Cortés-Vázquez
- Succeeded by: Cesar A. Perales

Personal details
- Born: November 21, 1958 (age 67) Caguas, Puerto Rico
- Spouse: Gerson Borrero
- Education: University of Puerto Rico (B.Ed., MA); Pace University School of Law (JD)
- Profession: Attorney

Ruth Noemí Colón (born November 21, 1958) was the 64th Secretary of State of New York, serving in the Cabinets of Governors David Paterson and Andrew Cuomo. She was appointed by Governor Paterson to replace outgoing Secretary Lorraine Cortés-Vázquez who officially resigned on September 1, 2010.

A resident of White Plains, Colón earned a bachelor degree in education and a master's degree in communications from the University of Puerto Rico. Colón has a Juris Doctor from Pace University School of Law. Secretary Colón is a member of the Westchester Women's Bar Association and serves on the board of directors of the Puerto Rican Bar Association.

On March 31, 2011, Governor Andrew Cuomo announced the nomination of Cesar A. Perales for the Secretary of State position. Effective May 2, 2011, Perales replaced Colón as the state's new Secretary of State and was confirmed by the New York State Senate on June 7.

== See also ==
- List of Puerto Ricans

Political offices
Preceded by Lorraine Cortés-Vázquez	Secretary of State of New York; 2010 - 2011	Succeeded by Cesar A. Perales
