= Ruschell Boone =

American television journalist (1975–2023)

- Born: Ruschell West; 1975; Kingston, Jamaica
- Died: 3 September 2023 (aged 48)
- Education: Baruch College
- Occupations: Reporter; journalist
- Spouse: Todd Boone (m. 2005)
- Children: 2
- Website: ruschellboone.com

Ruschell Boone (née West; 1975 – 3 September 2023) was a Jamaican-born American reporter and journalist based in New York City. She worked for NY1 cable television news from 2002 until her death in 2023.

== Early life and education ==
Ruschell West was born in Kingston, Jamaica. She immigrated to the Bronx in 1986 when she was 11, where she recalled being bullied for her Jamaican accent. She was one of five children in a blended family with her mother Faithlyn (Swaby) and stepfather Duke Scott.

Boone earned a degree in accounting from City University of New York (CUNY) Baruch College. Although she picked accounting to ensure a good living, she discovered her passion for journalism in her senior year when she took over a college radio segment for a missing guest. Boone's academic counselor tried to dissuade her from a career change, saying that it was too late for her to change paths and that she did not "fit the mold". After her death, CUNY established a scholarship named in her honor.

== Career ==
Working in cable television news since 1998, Boone was a business news associate for CNBC and then an associate producer and assignment editor for CNN. She joined NY1 in 2002.

As a reporter for NY1, she covered breaking stories such as the 2016 pressure-cooker bombing in Manhattan and the 2016 presidential election. She became a general assignment reporter for NY1's Live at Ten newscast in 2018. In 2019, Boone was nominated for three New York Emmy Awards for news reporting and work on NY1's talk shows, and in 2020 she was nominated again as a live reporter. She won in 2021 for her series New York: Unfiltered. She moved to the anchor desk in 2021, where her work was nominated for another Emmy posthumously in 2024.

== Personal life and death ==
On 24 September 2005, Ruschell West married Todd Boone, a production technician at NY1. They went on to have two sons. In 2022, she began a medical leave from NY1 for treatment of pancreatic cancer. She later returned to the NY1 anchor desk, but succumbed to medical complications on 3 September 2023, at the age of 48. Speakers at her memorial service included New York elected officials Letitia James, Eric Adams, Adrienne Adams, and Donovan Richards.

== Awards ==
- New York Press Club Award for Best Feature Reporting – 2013
- New York Association of Black Journalists award for Best Spot News Reporting – 2014
- City & State list of Queens Most Influential Leaders – 2016, 2019, 2020
- Queens District Attorney's William Tucker Garvin Public Service Award – 2019
- New York Emmy Award for Best Light News Feature Series – 2021
