= NY1 Noticias =

New York Spanish-language news channel

Spectrum Noticias
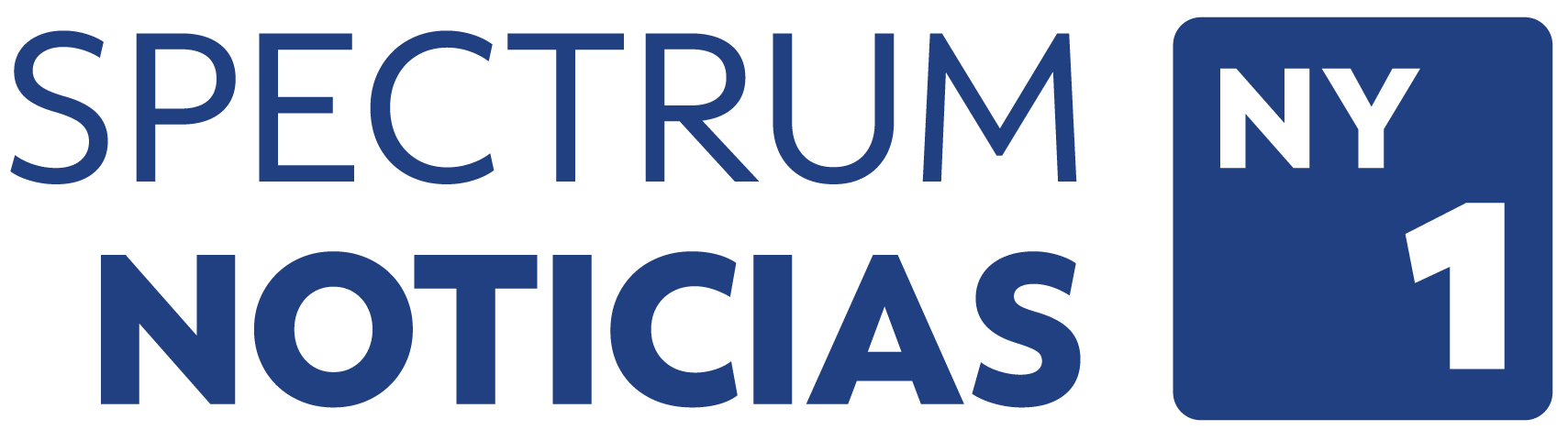
- Country: United States
- Broadcast area: New York metropolitan area
- Network: Spectrum News
- Headquarters: New York, New York

Programming
- Language: American Spanish
- Picture format: 1080i HDTV; (downscaled to letterboxed 480i for the SDTV feed)

Ownership
- Owner: Charter Communications
- Sister channels: NY1, NY1 Rail and Road, Spectrum Noticias LA

History
- Launched: June 30, 2003; 22 years ago
- Former names: NY1 Noticias (2003-2025)

Links
- Website: spectrumnoticias.com/ny/nyc

Availability

Terrestrial
- Charter Spectrum: 38 and 799
- Cablevision: 194

Spectrum Noticias also known as Spectrum Noticias NYC) (pronounced "Spectrum Noticias New York City", is a 24-hour Spanish-language cable news television channel owned by Charter Communications through its acquisition of Time Warner Cable in May 2016; it serves New York City's five boroughs. It is available to customers on channels 38 and 799 on Spectrum's DTV: Digital Television and DTV en Español and first went on the air at 8:01 p.m. on June 30, 2003. It can also be received on Cablevision channel 194 at select areas.

NY1 Noticias provides New York City area news and weather updates like its parent English channel, NY1, in pre-recorded 30-minute cycles but also features in-depth coverage of issues that have a direct impact on New Yorkers of Hispanic and Latin American heritage, such as immigration, public health and community affairs. The channel maintains a morning counterpart to Mornings on 1, dubbed Nueva York por la Mañana. The "Weather on the 1's" (Spanish: "El Tiempo en el 1") shows not only local and national forecasts but also North American forecasts.

Since 2005, NY1 Noticias airs a weekly political and the only non-hard news program, Pura Política, which is anchored by political reporter Juan Manuel Benitez.

Since 2021, NY1 Noticias airs a weekly segment on immigration, El Abogado a tu Lado, with immigration attorney, Luis Gomez Alfaro.

Since 2022, NY1 Noticias also releases a weekly podcast, Inmigracion con NY1 Noticias, which is co-hosted by Carlos Rajo and immigration attorney, Luis Gomez Alfaro.

Since 2025, NY1 Noticias moved channels from 95 and 831 to 38 and 799. And rebranded to Spectrum Noticias NYC on February 24, 2025.

== Notable on–air staff ==
Former logo of Time Warner Cable Noticias NY1 used from December 16, 2013 until November 15, 2016

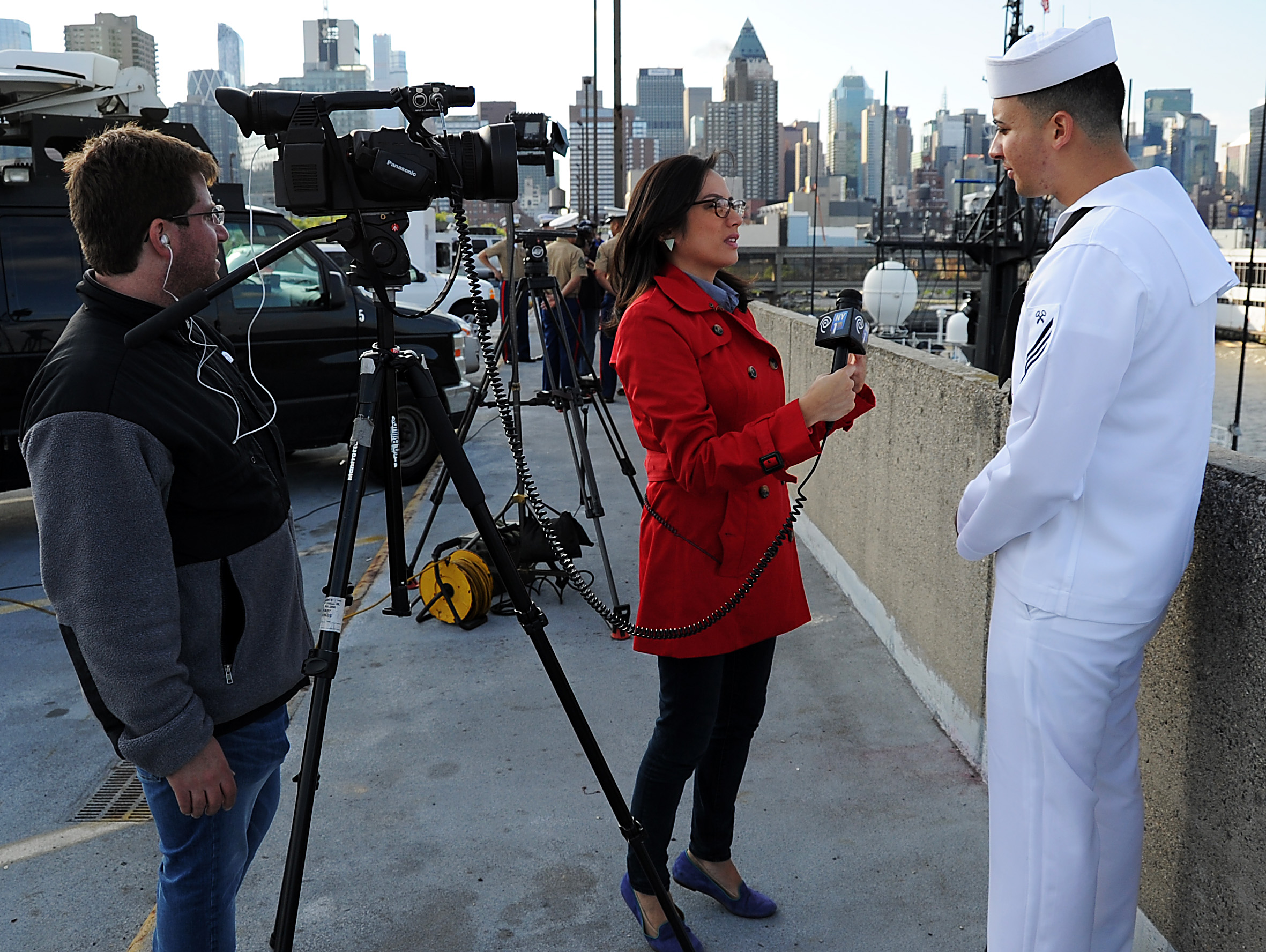
NY1 Noticias reporter Fabiola Galindo interviewing a sailor during Fleet Week 2015

=== Current ===
- Juan Manuel Benitez - anchor and reporter
- Philip Klint - anchor
- Julio César García - anchor and reporter
- Patsi Arias – anchor
- Birmania Ríos - reporter
- Yenniffer Martínez - reporter

=== Former ===
- Carleth Keys – anchor
