= Gary Anthony Ramsay =

- Education: Southeastern Oklahoma State University
- Occupations: News executive, entrepreneur, news anchor, talk show host, producer
- Website: arise.tv garyanthonyramsay.com

Gary Anthony Ramsay is an American news anchor, journalist, diversity advocate and communications businessman. He worked with WCTQ and WINK-TV, before spending 15 years as an anchor with NY1 from 1992 onwards. In 2007, Ramsay left his role with NY1 to launch his own media company Great Pitch Media. In 2012, he set up Arise News with Nduka Obaigbena.

His work with NY1 led Ramsay to receive accolades from the National Association of Black Journalists, Associated Press and was also a recipient of the Edward R. Murrow award.

Ramsay was the VP of U.S. News, Operations & Public Affairs for Arise News Networks, from September 2012 and resigned in May 2015 after Arise ownership ran into cash flow problems.

== Early life and education ==
Ramsay was born in Jamaica, before moving to New York City and growing up in the New York City borough of Southeast Queens.

In 1981, Ramsay studied at the Spartan College of Aeronautics and Technology, where he achieved an Associate degree with an Associate of Science in Aviation. After studying at the Spartan College of Aeronautics and Technology until 1982, Ramsay moved to Southeastern Oklahoma State University, where he studied for three years.

At the end of his University education, he achieved a Bachelor of Science degree in Business & Aviation.

== Career ==
Ramsay's career started in radio, working for WCTQ in February 1988. He held the position as a radio host until 1990, while also being the News & Sports Director for WCTQ.

After working in radio, Ramsay moved to a joint position with WINK-TV, where he would be involved with both television and radio. He worked as the Bureau Chief and was responsible for developing and follow-up stories in the Fort Myers and Port Charlotte areas of Florida.

His first major role was after he left his role at WINK-TV to join NY1 in New York City. His move to NY1 came in June 1992. Ramsay joined the news network at the time of its foundation and was part of the team when the show first aired in 1992. While working as a news anchor for the show, he broke the first attack on the World Trade Center in 1993 and the murder in the New York City Hall in 2003. As a reporter he broke the grounding of the Chinese cargo ship Golden Venture, which exposed human trafficking in America.

Other notable news coverage included the second World Trade Center attack in 2001, the Kosovo War in 1999 and also the war in Iraq in 2003. His coverage and reporting led Ramsay to receive a number of accolades for his work, including awards from the National Association of Black Journalists. He also received awards from the New York Press Club, and the Associated Press. Ramsay was also the recipient of the Edward R. Murrow award.

According to an interview with Ramsay, he stated that he had made a decision to leave NY1 after 15 years in the summer of 2007. Following his meeting with NY1 executives, he continued to work as a news anchor for the station. In November of that year, Ramsay phoned a live show on the same network as NY1 News under a false name. He then made a number of comments on the developing news story. This was later picked up by NY1 executives as Ramsay, who went onto describe his actions as "a flash moment of frustration". This led Ramsay to resign from his role at NY1 after 15 years as an anchor on the network.

Many other New York-based tabloids picked up on the story, but many quoted inaccuracies when compared to the New York Times article. This included the NY Daily News, who had stated Ramsay was sacked from his role, when according to the NY Times he had quit.

Ramsay was one of the founding members of Arise News, along with Nduka Obaigbena. The news station broadcasts 24-hour coverage from broadcast hubs in London, New York, Johannesburg and Lagos. In 2009, Ramsay was quoted by AdWeek in his role as President of the New York Association of Black Journalists, following the firing of a journalist from the New York Post.

In 2010, NY1 was the defendant against one of its former employees, who sued the station. Ramsay was called to the stand as a witness during the trial, which dated back to his time of employment at NY1. NY1 prevailed in the suit.
