= Carleth Keys =

Venezuelan news anchor and reporter

- Born: Carleth Revete; Puerto Ordaz, Venezuela
- Occupation: News Anchor for NY1 Noticias

Carleth Revete, known professionally as Carleth Keys (pronounced car-LET), is a Venezuelan news anchor and reporter and former print journalist and television program host.

== Early life ==
Keys was born and raised in Puerto Ordaz, Venezuela. She attended the Universidad Católica Andrés Bello, where she studied mass communications. In 2000, she immigrated to the United States, residing in Tampa, Florida. In 2007, she moved to New York City.

== Professional background ==
=== Print journalism ===
Keys started her journalism career reporting for El Nacional newspaper in Caracas, Venezuela. In 2000, after immigrating to the US, she wrote for a trilingual newspaper in Ybor City, Florida, called La Gaceta.

=== Television journalism ===
Keys has served as the news anchor and managing editor for Bay News 9 En Español, which broadcasts in the Tampa Bay area.

She moved to New York in 2007, where she was a prime time news anchor for NY1 Noticias, a 24-hour local cable news channel that broadcasts in New York City. She was also the host for the fashion and celebrity show De Moda, a Spanish language Webcast that is broadcast in Yahoo! en Español.

== Filmography ==
In 2004, Keys appeared as a Spanish news anchor in The Punisher.

== Honors and awards ==
- 2003: Hispanic Media Woman of the Year as named by the Tampa Hispanic Heritage Committee
- 2004: Suncoast Chapter Emmy nomination for best series
- 2004: Finalist for the Tampa Bay Business Journal's Business Woman of the Year Award in Media
- 2006: AP Florida Awards winner of the best short hard feature
- 2008: One of the most outstanding Venezuelans abroad by El Universal newspaper, in its 99th anniversary edition
