= Juan Manuel Benítez =

Spanish-born journalist and journalism professor in New York City

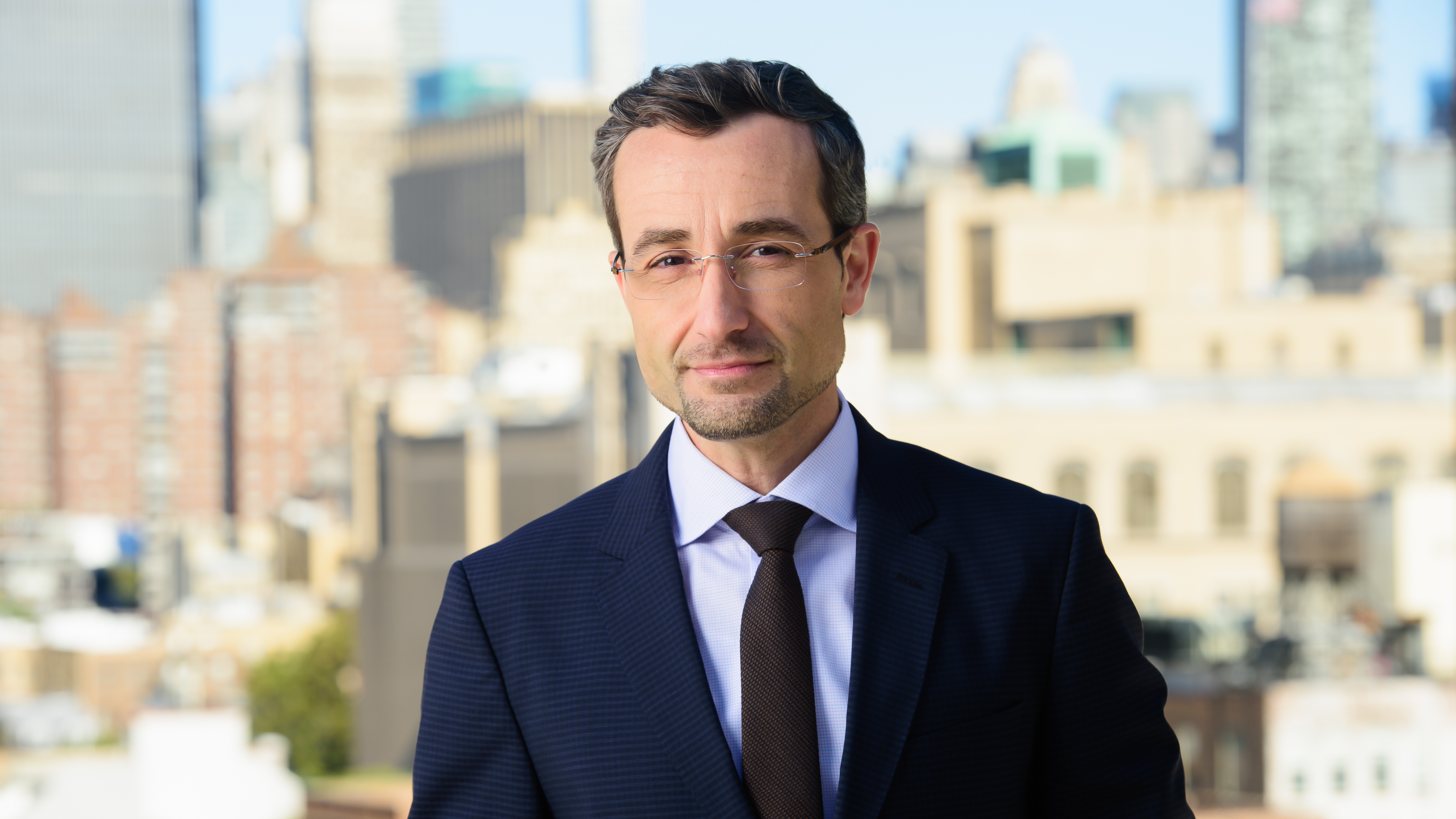
Juan Manuel Benítez

Juan Manuel Benítez Fernel (born in Badajoz, Spain) is a Spanish-born American bilingual journalist, television anchor, podcaster, and professor of journalism based in New York City. He holds the Philip S. Balboni Professorship of Local Journalism at the Columbia University Graduate School of Journalism.

== Early life and education ==
Benítez was born in Badajoz, Spain. He earned a bachelor’s degree in Anglo-German Language and Literature from the University of Extremadura. He holds a master’s degree from Columbia University’s School of International and Public Affairs (SIPA). He also studied at the Heidelberg University, the University of Lisbon, and Kalamazoo College.

== Career ==
Benítez began his journalism career as a reporter for Hispanic Market Weekly.

In 2003, he joined NY1 in New York City and helped launch its Spanish-language sister channel, NY1 Noticias (later Spectrum Noticias). At NY1/NY1 Noticias, he hosted the weekly political affairs show Pura Política and co-hosted the bilingual podcast Off Topic/On Politics. He covered successive New York City mayoral administrations and national elections, and moderated numerous televised debates. Benítez has also served as a guest host on The Brian Lehrer Show on WNYC, and has appeared as a political commentator on MSNBC, NTN24, and other outlets. He has written opinion columns for El Diario La Prensa.

In 2025, Benítez launched the weekly interview podcast Juan Manuel Benítez Wants to Know, which features in-depth conversations with political leaders, policy thinkers, and cultural figures shaping New York City and beyond. The show blends policy analysis and personal storytelling, with guests including Brad Lander, Kathryn Wylde, Mark Levine, Eric Adams, and Curtis Sliwa.

Benítez has reported on climate change and adaptation, earning a New York Emmy Award for his coverage. He is also the recipient of awards from the New York Press Club, the New York State Associated Press Association, and the HOLA Excellence in TV Award.

Before joining Columbia, he taught bilingual journalism at the Craig Newmark Graduate School of Journalism at CUNY, where he helped design the bilingual journalism curriculum.

He became the Philip S. Balboni Professor of Local Journalism at Columbia Journalism School in 2023. He also serves on the jury of the Alfred I. duPont–Columbia University Awards|duPont–Columbia Awards.

== Personal life ==
Benítez resides in Manhattan.

== Selected awards and recognition ==
- New York Emmy Award (for climate coverage)
- New York Press Club Award
- Associated Press Association Award
- HOLA Excellence in TV Award

== See also ==
- NY1 Noticias
- Columbia University Graduate School of Journalism
