= New York State Division of Criminal Justice Services =

The New York State Division of Criminal Justice Services (DCJS) is a division of the New York State Executive Department. This division provides "services" for New York's criminal justice offices and units. The chief executive of this department is called a "Commissioner." The current Commissioner of DCJS is Rossana Rosado, appointed in November 2021.

In 2011, DCJS moved its offices from Stuyvesant Plaza to the Alfred E. Smith Building.

DCJS provides the following services to New York State's government;

- Law enforcement training
  - Security guard training
- Criminal justice training
- Law enforcement accreditation
- Quality assurance for breathalyzers and speed checkers
- Criminal justice grant fund management
- Crime data and statistics analysis
- Research support
- Oversees county probation departments and alternatives to incarceration programs
- Coordination of juvenile justice policy
- Staff support to independently appointed commissions and councils;
  - New York State Commission on Forensic Science

DCJS also provides these services for the public;

- Criminal history records and fingerprint files
- Background checks
- Sex Offender Registry
- Missing Persons Clearinghouse
- DNA Databank
  - alongside the New York State Police Forensic Investigation Center
