= NY1 Rail and Road =

American TV news channel

- Country: United States
- Broadcast area: NY metro area
- Network: Spectrum News
- Headquarters: New York, NY

Programming
- Language: English
- Picture format: 480i (SDTV)

Ownership
- Owner: Charter Communications
- Sister channels: NY1, NY1 Noticias

History
- Launched: August 18, 2010; 15 years ago
- Closed: September 29, 2023

NY1 Rail and Road was a 24-hour cable news channel focusing exclusively on the vehicular traffic and mass transit conditions within the five boroughs of New York City. Owned by Charter Communications through its acquisition of Time Warner Cable in May 2016, the channel was a spin-off from its parent station NY1's popular report of the same name. It was available to New York City Spectrum subscribers on channel 214, and on channel 91 in New Jersey and Hudson Valley, until September 29, 2023 at 9:00 PM EDT. NY1 Rail and Road updated every five minutes and had feeds for four different zones (Manhattan and Brooklyn, Queens, Staten Island, and the Hudson Valley.) The station aired a constant floating digital aerial map of New York City with a short anchor segment every half-hour, along with periodic cutaways indicating mass transit service changes.

The digital map (with data provided by INRIX) highlighted major streets which were color-coded according to the speed of traffic with INRIX's common coding, with black indicating a completely jammed or closed road, red indicating traffic flow of less than 25 miles per hour (dark red if around less than 15 mph), yellow 25–50 mph flow, and green little to no traffic.
