= Cesar A. Perales =

American politician (born 1940)

Cesar Perales

65th Secretary of State of New York
- In office May 2, 2011 – February 3, 2016
- Governor: Andrew Cuomo
- Preceded by: Ruth Noemí Colón
- Succeeded by: Rossana Rosado

Personal details
- Born: November 12, 1940 (age 85) New York City, New York, U.S.
- Party: Democratic
- Education: City University of New York, City College (BA); Fordham University (JD)

Cesar Augusto Perales (born November 12, 1940) is an American attorney, civil servant and was the previous Secretary of State of New York in the Cabinet of Governor Andrew Cuomo. Perales was appointed by Cuomo on March 31, 2011, and unanimously confirmed by the New York State Senate on June 7.

== Early life ==
The son of a Puerto Rican father and a Dominican mother, Perales grew up in New York City. He has said he first considered becoming a lawyer as a child, after his father's business went bankrupt.

"It really cost us a lot. I'm talking about losing furniture in the house, having it repossessed and things of that nature. It was a very terrible period for our family. And my father once told me that if he had had good legal help this wouldn't have happened."

Perales went on to earn a bachelor's degree from City College in 1962 and graduated from Fordham Law School in 1965.

Upon graduating from Fordham, Perales worked at the legal unit for a Ford Foundation-funded program on the Lower East Side of New York called Mobilization for Youth. In 1968, when the federal government began to open neighbourhood legal services programs as part of the War on Poverty, Perales was selected to establish the first Brooklyn Legal Services Office. His experiences working in New York's Puerto Rican neighborhoods allowed him to also assume the role of legal advocate for New York's Latino community. In April 1969, he represented the students who took over his alma mater, the City College of New York to demand the admission of more minority students.

In January 1970, he represented the Young Lords Organization when they took control of a church to provide community services to poor community in El Barrio. Perales negotiated the early morning non-violent arrest of over 100 members the Young Lords who refused to leave the church. "The Young Lords were seen as a radical young Puerto Rican group that, actually in that situation had taken over that church and were offering breakfast to the kids," Perales said. "These young people had a right to have a lawyer. I was doing my job as a lawyer for a group that I thought was doing good things."

== Government service ==
Perales has spent more than four decades in public service, including serving as the regional director of the United States Department of Health, Education, and Welfare (HEW) in New York and later as Assistant Secretary of HEW during the administration of President Jimmy Carter.

Perales served as Commissioner of the New York State Department of Social Services under Governor Mario Cuomo and as Deputy Mayor of New York City under Mayor David Dinkins.

== Puerto Rican Legal Defense and Education Fund; other service ==
Perales is a co-founder of LatinoJustice PRLDEF and established the first Brooklyn Legal Services Office. In 1972, Perales, along with two other young Puerto Rican attorneys—Jorge Batista and Victor Marrero—raised enough seed money to open the Puerto Rican Legal Defense and Education Fund, a legal organization modeled on the NAACP Legal Defense Fund. Perales served as the first executive director and Marrero was chairman of the board. In its early days, the fund, known by the acronym PRLDEF (pronounced pearl-deaf), brought many important civil rights lawsuits on behalf of Latinos living in New York City and across the U.S.

In 1974, the consent decree issued in PRLDEF's suit Aspira v. New York City Board of Education became central to the United States’ establishment of bilingual education programs in schools across the country. And, in several lawsuits against the New York Civil Service Commission, New York Police Department and New York Sanitation Commission, PRLDEF was able to get the courts to strike down numerous civil service requirements that kept Latinos from public employment and eliminated barriers to government benefits for non-English speaking applicants.

In the mid-1970s, a number of PRLDEF lawsuits, beginning with Lopez v. Dinkins on the local level and culminating with Ortiz v. New York State Board of Elections on the statewide level, forced election officials in New York to provide bilingual assistance. The litigation had national impact in 1975 when Congress amended the Voting Rights Act to include the right to bilingual voting procedures.

In 1981, Perales returned to PRLDEF after another stint in government. Within six months, PRLDEF was at the forefront of litigation to get the Justice Department to block the election of the New York City Council until district lines were redrawn in a nondiscriminatory manner. The subsequent court order halting the elections was perhaps the most dramatic application of the Voting Rights Act in the North.

Perales left government in 1994 to assume the position of senior vice president at Columbia Presbyterian Medical Center. During his tenure at the hospital, he developed a Community Health Care system that received national recognition.

In 2003, Perales returned to the organization he had founded. PRLDEF quickly gained new prominence as an advocate and defender of the rights of immigrants. The fund's attorneys won a major victory against the Town of Brookhaven, New York in 2005 when a judge ruled that the town had to halt its policy of selectively enforcing its housing code laws against Latino households and its practice of evicting tenants without prior notice.

The group's case against Hazleton, Pennsylvania's anti-immigrant ordinance in 2007 was the first of its kind to go to a full trial, and ended with a federal judge issuing the precedent-setting ruling that immigration legislation is a matter reserved to the federal government.

Under Perales's leadership, the group was also among the first to challenge violent early morning raids of private homes by federal Immigration and Customs Enforcement agents. The organization has also filed a unique petition with the Inter-American Commission on Human Rights, arguing that the United States' aggressive immigration enforcement policies create a climate that fosters bias crimes.

In 2008, PRLDEF's board of directors voted to change the name of the group to more accurately reflect changes in its mission, its client base, and the make-up of its board. The Puerto Rican Legal Defense and Education Fund changed its name to LatinoJustice PRLDEF. "Latinos are beginning to see themselves as a group, as a community," said Perales. "There is a coming together of identification in a common struggle."

Political offices
Preceded by Ruth Noemí Colón	Secretary of State of New York; 2011–2016	Succeeded by Rossana Rosado
