= 2004 New York Democratic presidential primary =

- March 2, 2004

284 Democratic National Convention delegates (236 pledged, 48 unpledged) The number of pledged delegates received is determined by the popular vote
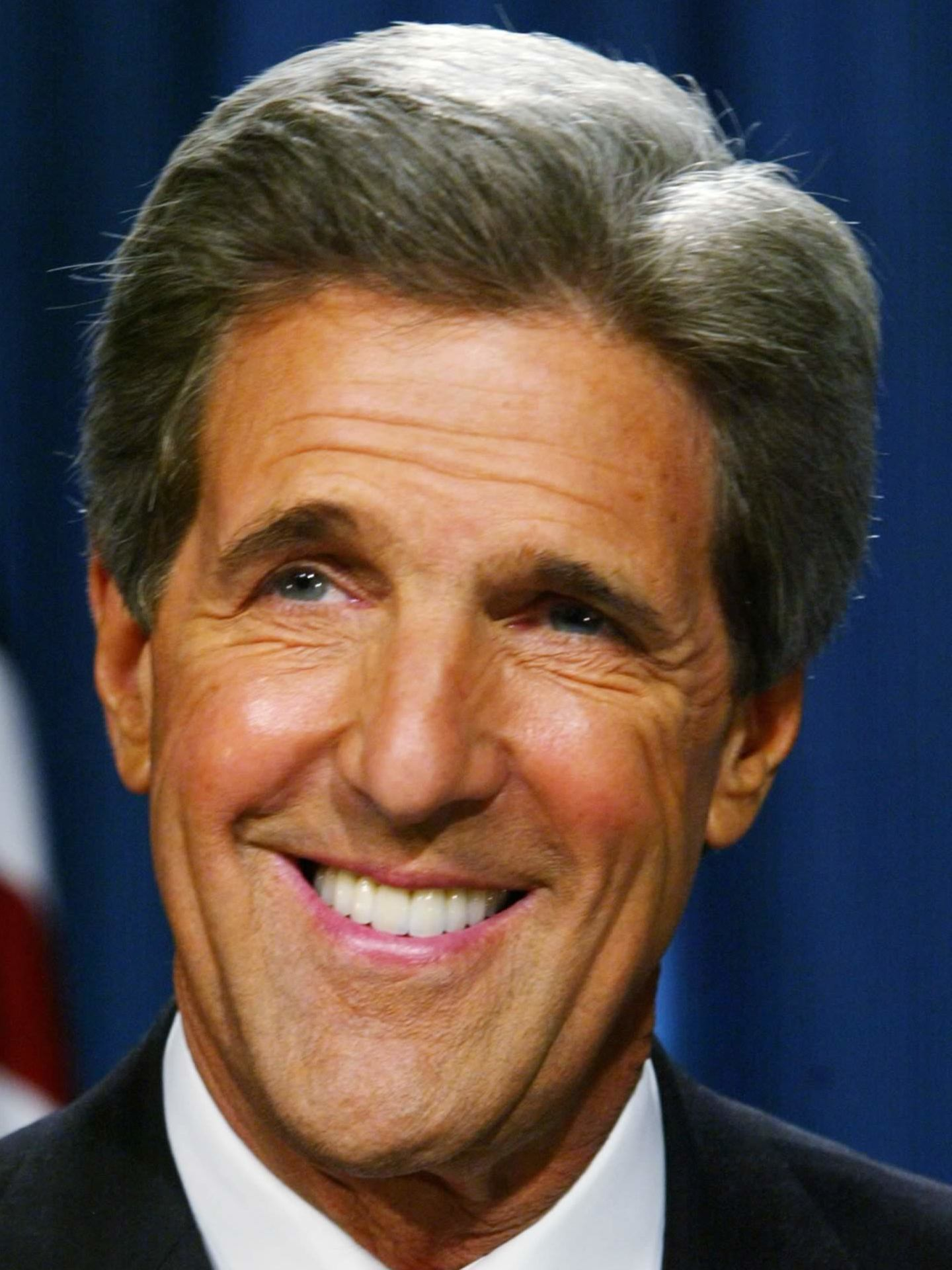

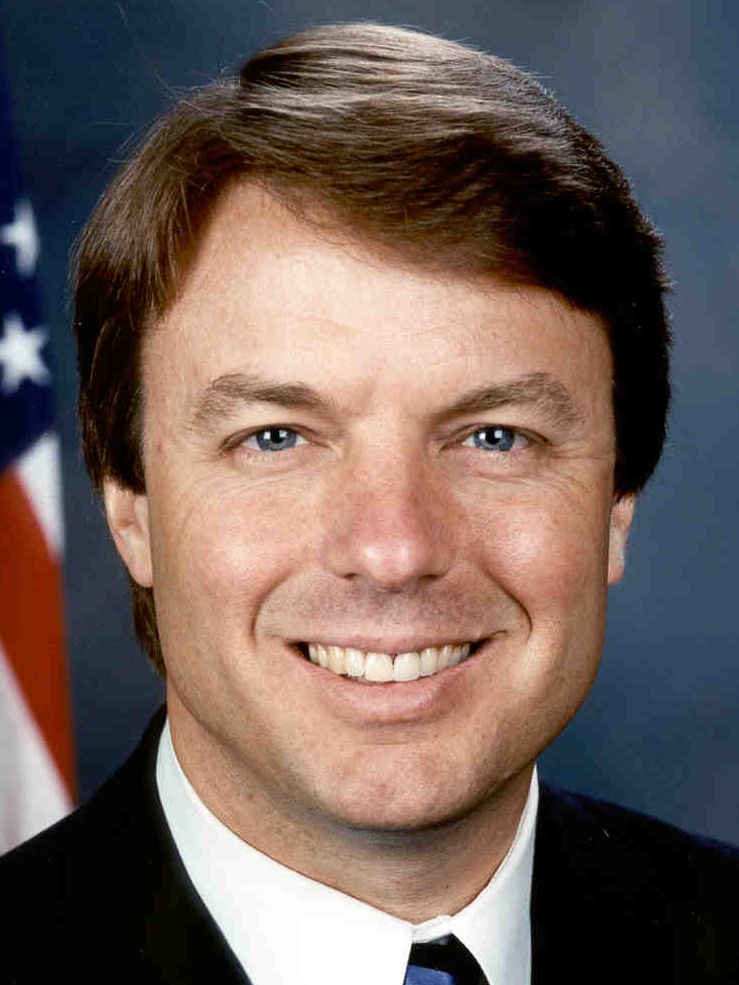

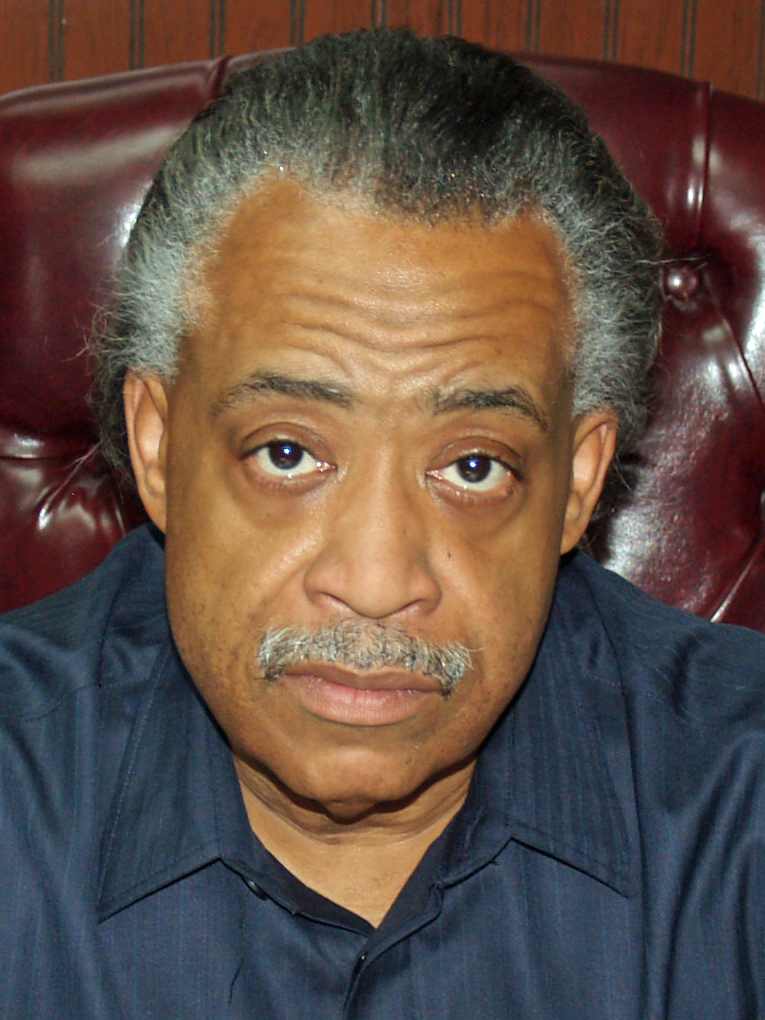

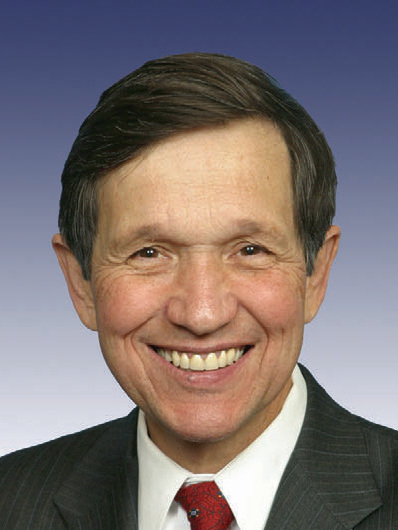
Candidate	John Kerry	John Edwards
Home state	Massachusetts	North Carolina
Delegate count	175	53
Popular vote	437,754	143,960
Percentage	61.17%	20.12%
Candidate	Al Sharpton	Dennis Kucinich
Home state	New York	Ohio
Delegate count	8	0
Popular vote	57,456	36,680
Percentage	8.03%	5.13%
- County results Kerry: 35–40% 40–45% 45–50% 50–55% 55–60% 60–65% 65–70%

The 2004 New York Democratic presidential primary took place on March 2, 2004, also known as Super Tuesday.

== Results ==
100% of precincts reporting
Candidate	Votes	Percentage	Counties	Delegates
John Kerry	437,754	61.17%	62	174
John Edwards	143,960	20.12%	0	54
Al Sharpton	57,456	8.03%	0	8
Dennis Kucinich	36,680	5.13%	0	0
Howard Dean*	20,471	2.86%	0	0
Joe Lieberman*	9,314	1.30%	0	0
Dick Gephardt*	3,954	0.55%	0	0
Wesley Clark*	3,517	0.49%	0	0
Lyndon LaRouche	2527	0.35%	0	0
Total	715,633	100%	0	236

* Candidate withdrew prior to primary.

== See also ==
- 2004 Democratic Party presidential primaries
- 2004 New York Republican presidential primary
