= Cleo Coyle =

American novelist

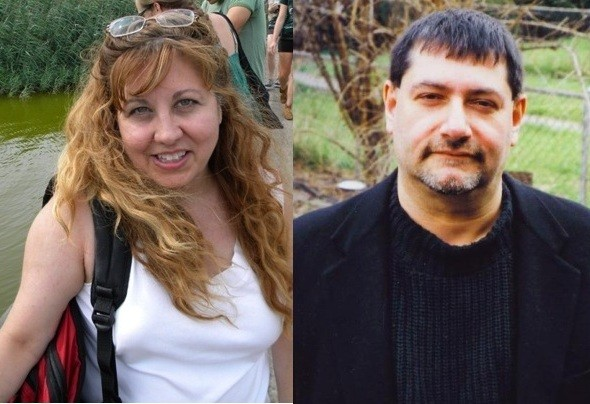
Alice Alfonsi and Marc Cerasini

Cleo Coyle is the pen name for American mystery writers Alice Alfonsi in collaboration with her husband Marc Cerasini, best-known for the Coffeehouse Mysteries (Berkley Prime Crime), a series of cozy mysteries set in and around a fictional coffeehouse in the Greenwich Village neighborhood of New York City.

== Biography ==
Alice Alfonsi and Marc Cerasini both grew up with Italian parents in working-class neighborhoods of Pittsburgh, Pennsylvania. Alfonsi graduated from Carnegie Mellon University in Pittsburgh, Pennsylvania; Cerasini graduated from Ohio University in Athens, Ohio. In New York, Alfonsi worked as a journalist and book author; Cerasini as a magazine editor, literary critic and fiction and nonfiction author. The couple met in Manhattan and married at the Little Church of the West in Las Vegas. They live in New York City.

Alfonsi was the ghostwriter for Hidden Passions, a novelization of the NBC soap opera Passions, which spent seven weeks on the 2001 New York Times hardcover fiction bestsellers list. Cerasini has written four novels in the 24: Declassified series of original Jack Bauer adventures based on the Fox TV series 24. He also wrote two original novels for Marvel Comics featuring Wolverine. His nonfiction includes The Future of War: The Face of 21st Century Warfare (Alpha Books, 2003).

Among their co-authored projects are the Haunted Bookshop mysteries (Penguin Group), originally written under the pen name Alice Kimberly and later published under their Cleo Coyle name. The paranormal cozy mystery series is set in and around an independent bookstore in Rhode Island, and features the ghost of a hardboiled PI from the 1940s who helps the modern-day bookshop owner solve crimes.

== Novels ==
=== The Coffeehouse Mystery Series ===
- On What Grounds (2003, ISBN 0-425-19213-X)
- Through the Grinder (2004, ISBN 0-425-19714-X)
- Latte Trouble (2005, ISBN 0-425-20445-6)
- Murder Most Frothy (2006, ISBN 0-425-21113-4)
- Decaffeinated Corpse (2007, ISBN 978-0-425-21638-5)
- French Pressed (2008, ISBN 978-0-425-22049-8)
- Espresso Shot (2008, ISBN 978-0-425-22177-8)
- Holiday Grind (2009, ISBN 978-0-425-23005-3)
- Roast Mortem (2010, ISBN 978-0-425-23459-4)
- Murder by Mocha (2011, ISBN 978-0-425-24143-1)
- A Brew to a Kill (August 2012, ISBN 978-0-425-24787-7)
- Holiday Buzz (November 2012, ISBN 978-0-425-25535-3)
- Billionaire Blend (December, 2013, ISBN 978-0-425-25291-8)
- Once Upon a Grind (December, 2014, ISBN 978-0-425-27085-1)
- Dead to the Last Drop (December, 2015, ISBN 978-0-425-27609-9)
- Dead Cold Brew (January, 2017, ISBN 978-0-425-27611-2)
- Shot In the Dark (April, 2018, ISBN 978-0-451-48884-8)
- Brewed Awakening (December 2019, ISBN 978-0451488879)
- Honey Roasted (January 2022, ISBN 978-0593197561)
- Bulletproof Barista (November 2023, ISBN 978-0593197615)

=== The Haunted Bookshop Mystery Series ===
- The Ghost and Mrs. McClure
- The Ghost and the Dead Deb
- The Ghost and the Dead Man's Library
- The Ghost and the Femme Fatale
- The Ghost and the Haunted Mansion
- The Ghost and the Bogus Bestseller
- The Ghost and the Haunted Portrait
- The Ghost and the Stolen Tears
- The Ghost Goes to the Dogs
