= NY1 =

American cable news television channel

- Country: United States
- Broadcast area: New York metropolitan area; (also available in certain areas of North Carolina, Florida and Upstate New York)
- Network: Spectrum News
- Headquarters: Manhattan, New York City

Programming
- Language: English
- Picture format: 1080i HDTV; (downscaled to letterboxed 480i for the SDTV feed)

Ownership
- Owner: Charter Communications
- Sister channels: NY1 Noticias; NY1 Rail and Road

History
- Launched: September 8, 1992; 34 years ago

Links
- Website: www.ny1.com/nyc/all-boroughs.html; (main site for all boroughs)

NY1 (also officially known as Spectrum News NY1 and spoken as New York One) is an American cable news television channel founded by Time Warner Cable, which itself is owned by Charter Communications through its acquisition in May 2016. The channel provides 24-hour news coverage, with a focus on the five boroughs of New York City; its programming primarily features news, traffic and weather, however NY1 also features specialty programs such as Inside City Hall (which is renamed Road to City Hall during New York City mayoral elections).

NY1 is available on Spectrum's New York City system on channel 1 in standard definition and 200 in high definition. The channel is available to more than two million cable customers within the five boroughs of New York City, as well as most parts of New Jersey served by Spectrum, Mount Vernon in Westchester County, New York, and Long Island. As of 2019, NY1 is not currently available on Verizon FiOS.

Outside the New York metropolitan area, NY1 is carried on Spectrum systems throughout the State of New York, and its HD simulcast channel is available on its Orlando and Tampa systems. It is also available on its Raleigh, Charlotte, and Greensboro systems in North Carolina on digital channel 215, both in standard and high definition. Like all Spectrum news channels, it is also available nationwide on the Spectrum News app to television and broadband subscribers, and to television subscribers through smart TV and mobile apps in the 2200 series. Outside the New York area, a loop of public service announcements and Spectrum promo ads is played over New York–specific advertising.

== History ==
NY1 logo used from 1992 to 2001.

NY1 was conceived by Richard Aurelio, the president of Time Warner Cable's New York City cable group who felt at the time that "New York City needed its own 24/7 news station that just covered the city." The channel launched on September 8, 1992; it originally operated from a newsroom at the National Video Center at 460 West 42nd Street in the Manhattan borough of New York City, under the guidance of vice president of news Paul Sagan and news director Steve Paulus. Construction of the 42nd Street facility was completed just over 1½ months earlier on July 15, however the channel's newly hired reporters actually began work one month beforehand by attending a videojournalism "boot camp".

While some of NY1's reporters had used their own cameras in other markets, most of them had no exposure to the technical side of journalism. Following their training, the reporters and the rest of the staff took part in an additional two-month training period that included four weeks of real-time rehearsal. A watershed event came in the final weeks of training, with the collapse of a former post office building on Manhattan's West Side. Although the channel was not yet on the air, NY1 reporters covered the story as if the channel was fully operational, interviewing survivors and witnesses.

NY1 logo used from 2001 to 2013.

Following the attack on the World Trade Center on September 11, 2001, NY1's feed was temporarily transmitted throughout the United States via Oxygen after the cable channel was unable to broadcast regular programming from its headquarters in the Manhattan neighborhood of Battery Park City, located near the World Trade Center. In 2001, Time Warner Cable began offering NY1 to digital cable subscribers in the Albany market (it remained on that system even after the October 2002 launch of sister cable news channel Capital News 9); the channel was added to Time Warner Cable systems in other markets—primarily those located in Upstate New York—thereafter.

In January 2002, the channel moved its operations to a new, all-digital facility on the sixth floor at Chelsea Market at 75 Ninth Avenue (between West 15th and 16th streets) in the Chelsea neighborhood of Manhattan. On June 30, 2003, Time Warner Cable launched NY1 Noticias, a Spanish-language version of the channel for digital cable subscribers. In 2005, NY1 launched NY1 on Demand, a video-on-demand service for Time Warner Cable customers, available on channel 1111 in the provider's New York City system.

In 2008, NY1 launched a high-definition simulcast feed on Time Warner Cable digital channel 701, although it was originally broadcast only in a pillarboxed format (a center-cut 4:3 picture with sidebars of the NY1 logo), until the channel migrated to a full 16:9 widescreen format in October 2009.

=== Rebranding to Time Warner Cable News NY1 ===
Former Time Warner Cable News NY1 logo used from December 16, 2013, to November 15, 2016

On March 14, 2013, Time Warner Cable announced plans to rebrand NY1 and its other regional news channels (including News 14 Carolina and the YNN networks) under the Time Warner Cable News brand by the end of the year, along with the adoption of new on-air logos and a standardized graphics package for each of the channels. The reasoning for the name change was due to the perception by the company that Time Warner Cable subscribers did not know that the provider owns its regional news channels and are largely exclusive to its systems (NY1 is an exception, as it was also carried by Cablevision in the New York City market).

The proposed name change for NY1 met with immediate controversy among Time Warner Cable's subscribers due to the familiarity with the brand and dissatisfaction with the provider's service by its New York City area customers. Time Warner Cable explored the possibility of keeping the NY1 brand while also including on-air references to its TWC ownership in some fashion, though executives confirmed that the rebranding would have no effect on the channel's news format or reporting style.

On November 20, 2013, Time Warner Cable announced that it would append the "Time Warner Cable News" brand to the beginning of the NY1 name, while "NY1" would continue to be used on-air as a primary brand. The revised branding as well as the new graphics and music package (which included a modified version of the logo used by the channel since 2001, amended alongside the "Time Warner Cable News" logo) went into effect on December 16, 2013.

In 2014, NY1's HD channel was moved to Time Warner Cable digital channel 200.

=== Renaming to Spectrum News NY1 ===
On May 18, 2016, Time Warner Cable was acquired by Charter Communications. The Time Warner Cable News branding was replaced by Spectrum News (named after Charter's cable services brand) beginning November 15, 2016. While the NY1 name is still in use, especially on air, it continues to incorporate the "Spectrum News" brand at the beginning of NY1's primary brand.

On March 30, 2017, Charter Communications announced plans for a major restructuring of NY1, as several reporters were laid off and some shows were cancelled in the upcoming months. A spokesperson for Charter said "As with any network, we're constantly evolving to find better ways to reach and engage our viewers. We seek to provide the most compelling information and entertainment possible by providing more context, in-depth reporting, analysis and explanation, cultivating a more relevant and thoughtful conversation that makes Spectrum News essential in the lives of Spectrum subscribers. From time to time, our programming and staffing will change as we strive to better cover the stories that resonate most with our viewers."

On April 1, 2017, the day after the restructuring, Richard Aurelio highly criticized the move, saying NY1 "can’t be about entertainment and ratings and making money. It’s about doing what’s best for New York and the people who live there." He also noted a deemphasis on local coverage that NY1 was supposed to focus on, especially after the cancellation of longtime shows The Call and NY Times Close Up, claiming that "they're really abandoning their commitment to the city."

== NY1 as prototype for other Time Warner Cable markets ==
NY1 was the first regional news channel to be operated by Time Warner Cable prior to the acquisition of Charter Communications; the cable provider has since launched 24-hour news channels in several other markets that are modeled after NY1 (two of which, News 24 Houston and News 9 San Antonio, both operated as joint ventures between TWC and Belo, had shut down within their first two years of operation). In addition to the channels launched by TWC, the provider also acquired Spectrum News Rochester (which debuted in 1990 as "WGRC") in 1995, after it assumed cable franchise rights in the Rochester, New York, market from Greater Rochester Cablevision. It also acquired Spectrum News 1 (which debuted in the late 2000s as cn|2) in 2012, after it assumed cable franchise rights in much of Kentucky from Insight Communications, and Spectrum News NECN (debuting in 1992 as New England Cable News) in 2026 after acquiring its assets from NBCUniversal. The majority of these channels, as of September 20, 2016, are now branded as "Spectrum News" as part of the integration with Time Warner Cable and Charter Communication's cable systems into Charter Spectrum. The channels include:

- Spectrum Bay News 9 – Tampa, Florida (debuted in 1997 as "Bay News 9")
- Spectrum News 13 – Orlando, Florida (debuted in 1997 as "Central Florida News 13")
- Spectrum News Austin – Austin, Texas (debuted in 1999 as "News 8 Austin")
- Spectrum News Capital Region – Albany, New York (debuted in 2002 as "Capital News 9")
- Spectrum News Central New York – Syracuse, New York (debuted in 2003 as "News 10 Now")
- Spectrum News NECN – Boston, Massachusetts and the wider New England region (debuted in 1992 as "New England Cable News")
- Spectrum News North Carolina – serving several markets in North Carolina (debuted as "News 14 Carolina" in Raleigh March 22, 2002, and in Charlotte June 14, 2002)
- Spectrum News Buffalo – Buffalo, New York (debuted in 2009 as "YNN Buffalo")
- Spectrum News 1 – serving several markets in Wisconsin (debuted in 2018)
- Spectrum News 1 SoCal – Los Angeles, California (debuted in 2018)

== Format ==
The most-common "program" on NY1 is a half-hour "news wheel" that begins at the top and bottom of each hour. It begins with a recap of top news headlines named the "NY1 Minute" and includes weather every 10 minutes "on the ones". The remainder of the half-hour is filled with mostly taped news segments heavily focusing on stories from the New York metropolitan area. There are 15 minutes of commercials per hour.

Nearly all stories are pre-recorded, even segments made to look like they are occurring live; instead of a "live" indicator during field reports from NY1's reporters, most stories seen on the channel have an on-screen graphic merely stating that the reporter is/was "on scene". This is because when the report was first broadcast, it may have originally been shown live but is not once it is re-aired, unless it updates a breaking news event. Moreover, reporters generally tape their own stories with video cameras (a practice known as video journalism), and send these taped reports to the newsroom to be edited for broadcast. A practice unique only to NY1 when it debuted, the 'one-man band' mode of journalism where the reporter records their own stories and surrounding narration has now become a standard with most local newscasts throughout the United States.

=== Locally produced programs ===
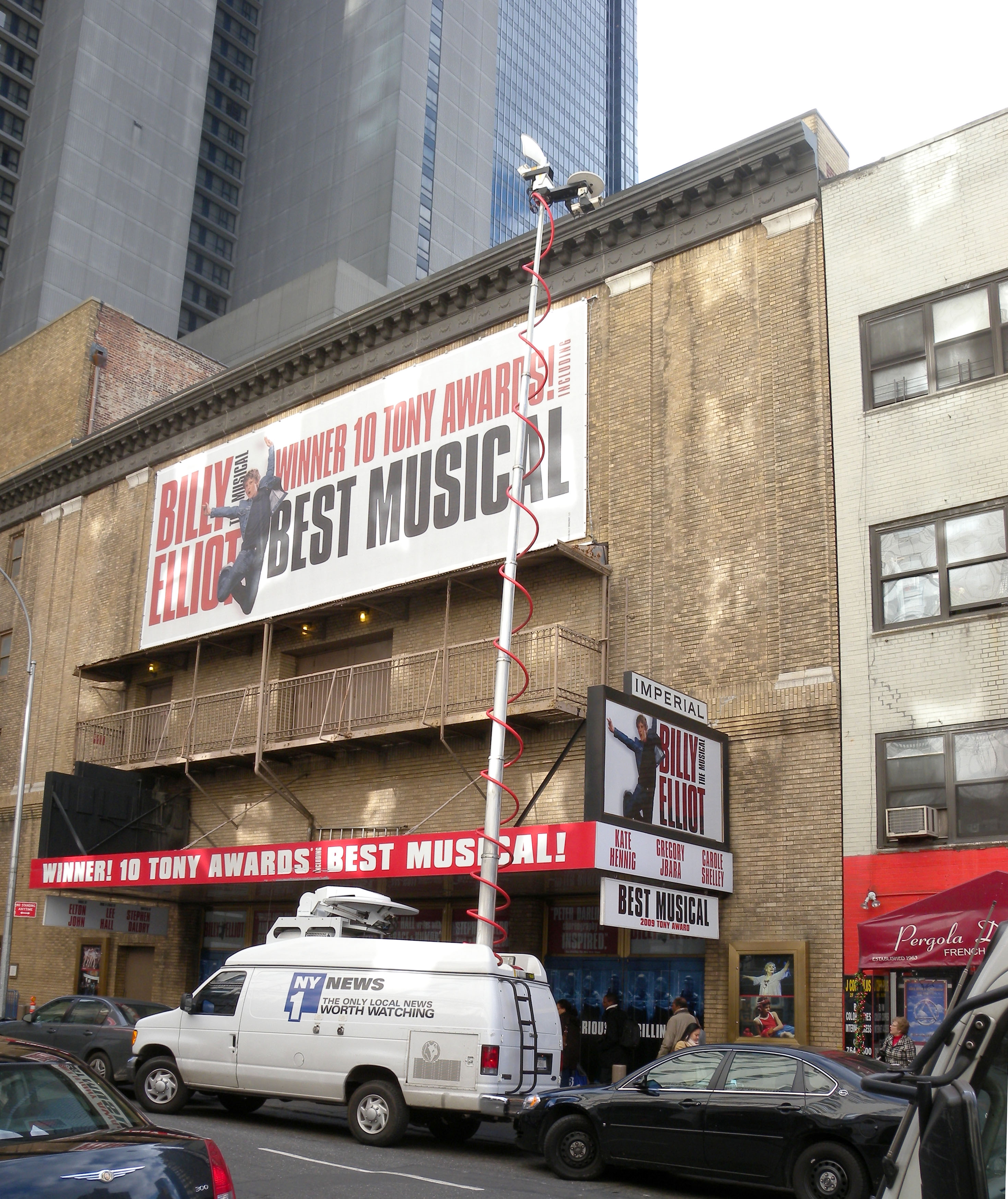
Remote broadcast van.

==== Mornings on 1 ====
Mornings on 1, which debuted on October 23, 2017, is a three-hour live weekday morning newscast (airs weekdays from 6:00 a.m. to 9:00 a.m.) that is designed to help New Yorkers get an informed start to their day with a dynamic mix of local news, headlines, politics, weather, and transit reports. Mornings on 1 is anchored by Pat Kiernan and traffic reporter Jamie Stelter.

The Rush Hour

The Rush Hour is a two-hour weekday afternoon newscast anchored by Annika Pergament. It launched on January 16, 2024, and airs from 4:00 p.m. to 6:00 p.m. on weekdays.

News All Day

News All Day is a four-hour weekday programming block anchored by Shannan Ferry. It serves as NY1's primary daypart newscast after Mornings on 1. The show was launched in November 2021, and airs from 12:00 p.m. to 4 p.m. on Weekdays. The block was anchored by Ruschell Boone until her death in 2023.

==== In Focus with Cheryl Wills ====
In Focus with Cheryl Wills is a 30-minute public affairs program hosted by NY1 Live at Ten anchor Cheryl Wills. The program features viewpoints from a roundtable of newsmakers on various topics that impacts New Yorkers.

==== Inside City Hall / Road to City Hall ====
Inside City Hall (re-titled Road to City Hall during mayoral election cycles) is a weeknight political program hosted by Errol Louis that covers politics both local and national. NY1 and its upstate sister channels have collaborated on (and sponsored) a number of political debates, coverage of these use Inside City Hall presentation.

==== NY1 at Ten ====
NY1 at Ten, which premiered on January 15, 2018, is an hour-long live weeknight newscast that delivers a complete summary of the day's news and the first look at tomorrow's. NY1 at Ten is anchored by Cheryl Wills and weather is presented by chief meteorologist John Davitt. Sister network SNY produces a sports report during the program, covering professional and collegiate sports highlights (NY1's sports department was shut down in September 2017). The program was originally known as NY1 Live at Ten from January 15, 2018 until January 10, 2025. The program was rebranded to NY1 Live at Ten since January 13, 2025.

==== On Stage ====
On Stage is a 30-minute program that premiered on May 4, 1998. Currently hosted by Frank DiLella, it primarily features reports on the New York City theater scene, as well as reports on theatrical performances from around the region.

Weekends on 1

Weekends on 1 is a weekend morning newscast anchored by Rocco Vertuccio that debuted in November 2021. It airs weekend mornings from 7:00 a.m. to noon.

=== Former notable programs ===
==== The Call ====
Launched on July 25, 2005, The Call was a live, one-hour call-in and write-in news show hosted by John Schiumo. Throughout the day, viewers were encouraged to vote on the top news stories of the day, and after receiving an email alert as to the top story, were asked to write or call in to discuss the topic with Schiumo. The program was expanded to one hour in January 2012 in response to viewer requests. The Call was cancelled on April 6, 2017.

==== News at Eleven ====
In an effort to compete with local late-night newscasts on the area's broadcast television stations in the timeslot, NY1 debuted a nightly 11:00 p.m. newscast titled NY1 News at Eleven (later retitled Time Warner Cable News NY1 at Eleven and Spectrum News NY1 at Eleven) on January 22, 2007. The newscast was last anchored by Lewis Dodley on weeknights and Cheryl Wills on weekends. The 11 p.m. newscast was quietly cancelled following its September 28, 2017, broadcast.

==== The New York Times Close Up ====
The New York Times Close Up (originally titled New York Closeup), which premiered on September 8, 1992, was hosted by New York Times urban affairs correspondent Sam Roberts and was produced in association with the newspaper. The show gave viewers an inside preview of the most compelling reports from Sunday's Times, with the correspondents who filed the stories. It featured Times reporters, columnists, and editors examining the week's top stories in the New York City area. The last episode on NY1 aired on April 8, 2017; since September 15, 2017, The New York Times Close Up has aired on CUNY TV.

==== Sports on 1: The Last Word ====
Sports on 1: The Last Word, which premiered on September 8, 1992, was a live 55-minute call-in sports program (airing every night at 11:35 p.m.) that provided recaps of the local sports scores and headlines of the day. It was hosted by Phil Andrews, Kevin Garrity, or Dario Melendez on various days. The show aired its final program on September 28, 2017.

==== Spotlight NY ====
Debuting on December 2, 2017, Spotlight NY was a 30-minute program hosted by weekend afternoon anchor Vivian Lee that explored the arts and culture of the city. The show aired its final program two years later on January 6, 2019.

== News team ==
=== Current on-air staff ===
- Guy Brown — Meteorologist
- Erin Billups — health reporter
- Roger Clark — general assignment reporter
- Bobby Cuza — political reporter
- John Davitt — chief meteorologist
- Frank DiLella — theater reporter and host of On Stage
- Bree Driscoll — anchor/reporter
- Shannan Ferry — anchor/reporter
- Kevin Frey — Washington, D.C., bureau reporter
- Rebecca Greenberg — reporter
- Stef Manisero — anchor/reporter
- Courtney Gross — political reporter
- Bob Hardt — political director
- Jillian Jorgensen — education reporter
- Pat Kiernan – morning anchor
- Ron Lee — traffic anchor
- Errol Louis – political reporter and host of Inside City Hall/Road to City Hall
- Victoria Manna — Staten Island reporter
- Dean Meminger — criminal justice reporter
- Alyssa Paolicelli — general assignment reporter
- Annika Pergament — Anchor, The Rush Hour
- Justine Re — reporter
- Dan Rivoli — traffic reporter
- Josh Robin — chief national political reporter
- Stephanie Simon — freelance anchor
- Jamie Stelter — traffic reporter
- Rocco Vertuccio — anchor/reporter
- Cheryl Wills — anchor, NY1 Live at Ten, and host of In Focus with Cheryl Wills

=== Former on-air staff ===
- Angi Gonzalez — anchor/reporter (2015-2021); Now a National Political Correspondent for Spectrum News
- Anthony Pascale — anchor/reporter (2020-2024); now on-air reporting for FanDuel TV, covering horse racing
- Asa Aarons – employment reporter (2009–2012); now with WJCL
- Amy Yensi — Bronx reporter (2018-2022); now reports for PIX11
- Dominic Carter – host of Inside City Hall/Road to City Hall and senior political reporter (1992–2009); now with WRNN-TV
- Clodagh McGowan — Queens reporter (2013-2023)
- Emily Ngo — political reporter (2019-2023)
- Gloria Pazmino — political reporter (2019-2022); now National Correspondent for CNN
- Edric Robinson — Manhattan reporter (Left 2023); now with News 12 Networks
- Juan Manuel Benítez — political reporter (2003-2023)
- Steve Cangialosi – sports anchor/reporter (1992–2000); now at MSG Plus, MSG Network, and WEPN-FM
- Duke Castiglione – sports broadcaster on Sports on 1 (2000–2005); now with WCVB
- Deborah Feyerick – anchor/reporter (1992–2000; now with CNN)
- Stacy-Ann Gooden – weekday morning meteorologist (2017–2019; now with WPIX)
- Taina Hernandez – political reporter (1997–2001; later with ABC News and WNYW)
- Greg Kelly – political affairs reporter (2000–2002; later with WNYW; now with Newsmax TV)
- Matt McClure – business anchor (2013–2019; now Executive Producer at iHeartMedia)
- Nancy Loo — anchor/reporter (1992-1994; later with WABC-TV; now with NewsNation)
- Kerri Lyon – reporter (1997–2002)
- Lindsay Tuchman — general assignment reporter (2017-2021, Now reports for WABC-TV)
- Lori Chung — general assignment reporter (2014-2023); Now anchors for Spectrum's National News Station
- Lewis Dodley — anchor (1992-2024); retired
- Gary Anthony Ramsay – anchor/reporter (1992–2007)
- Carol Anne Riddell – reporter (1992–1996; later with WNBC)
- Sam Roberts – host of "The New York Times Close Up" (1992–2017)
- Neil Rosen – movie critic (1992–2017)
- Melissa Russo – political reporter (1992–1998; now with WNBC)
- Jeremy Schaap – political reporter (1992–1993); now with ESPN
- Andrew Schmertz – Brooklyn and morning reporter (1994–1998); former business anchor- WABC; now CEO of Hopscotch Air, Inc.
- Roma Torre – weekday afternoon anchor and theater critic (1992–2020)
- Alicia Vitarelli – reporter; now with WPVI-TV
- Erick Adame — meteorologist (2018-2022)
- Ruschell Boone - reporter/anchor, News All Day (deceased)
- Zach Fink — Albany reporter (left 2023)

== Related channels ==
=== NY1 Noticias ===
NY1 Noticias (pronounced as "New York One Noticias" and also known as Spectrum Noticias NY1) is a Spanish language regional cable news channel that was launched on June 30, 2003, as an offshoot of NY1. It is available on Spectrum digital channels 95 and 831. Like its English language parent network, NY1 Noticias covers general news stories primarily focused on the New York City metropolitan area, along with in-depth coverage of issues affecting the area's Hispanic population.

=== NY1 Rail and Road ===
NY1 Rail and Road (pronounced as "New York One Rail and Road") was a cable channel that focused on the traffic and mass transit conditions within the New York City metropolitan area. Launched on August 18, 2010, the channel was exclusive to Spectrum Cable subscribers (carried on digital channel 214 in New York City, and digital channel 91 in New Jersey and the Hudson Valley). The channel featured traffic and transit updates on five-minute intervals with separate feeds for Manhattan and Brooklyn, Queens, Staten Island, and the Hudson Valley, respectively. The channel shut down September 29, 2023.

== In popular culture ==
=== Film ===
- In the thriller Sliver (1993), a television in the building's laundry room broadcasts NY1.
- In the crime drama The Yards (2000), NY1 reporters are featured reporting several events in the plot.
- In the romantic comedy Maid in Manhattan (2002), a Mexican hotel maid impersonates a high-class woman having an argument with a politician.
- In the comedy Elf (2003), NY1 is the station through which the story of an alleged Christmas Eve sighting of Santa Claus spreads throughout New York City.
- In the documentary Super Size Me (2004), a NY1 report on the blizzard of 2003 is shown for several seconds.
- In the comedy White Chicks (2004), the character Denise is an NY1 News reporter.
- In the adventure comedy Night at the Museum (2006), NY1 is one of the stations that carries the story about dinosaur tracks leading into New York City's American Museum of Natural History. (The other station is WNYW, due to the fact that the movie was produced by 20th Century Fox.)
- In the monster movie Cloverfield (2008), NY1's Roma Torre reports on the earthquake preceding the arrival of the monster.
- In the science fiction movie Jumper (2008), various footage of the NY1's opening are seen.
- In the thriller The Taking of Pelham 123 (2009), NY1 political reporter Michael Scotto appears briefly.
- In the superhero film The Amazing Spider-Man 2, the NY1 logo is seen throughout the film.
- In a post-credits scene in the superhero film Spider-Man: Far From Home, Pat Kiernan makes a cameo as himself and reports on a skirmish in London, in which Mysterio has framed Spider-Man for his murder through edited footage aired on NY1. NY1's news trucks, weather graphics, helicopter, and other reports are also seen throughout the film.
- In the Liam Neeson movie The Commuter (2018), aerial and other news footage can be seen broadcasting on TV screens with the Spectrum NY1 logo and graphics.

=== Literature ===
- NY1 anchor Pat Kiernan appears briefly in Through the Grinder, the second novel in The Coffeehouse Mystery Series by Cleo Coyle.

=== Music ===
- "That's It That's All," from the To the 5 Boroughs (2004) album by the Beastie Boys, contains the line "Like George Whipple on New York 1; Got a hairy ass and that's no fun." Whipple covered celebrity gossip and high society for NY1.

=== Television ===
- Episodes of the courtroom drama series 100 Centre Street, the drama series Third Watch, the police procedural and legal drama series Law & Order (and its spinoffs Law & Order: Criminal Intent and Law & Order: Special Victims Unit) and the situation comedy series Spin City briefly show TVs in the background that are tuned to NY1.
- Episodes of the drama series The Sopranos feature NY1 television reporters and anchors.
- The sitcom How I Met Your Mother featured character Robin Scherbatsky as an NY1 reporter, although the show branded it "Metro News 1." The character formerly co-anchored the network with Sandy Rivers, who reads from the newspaper much like NY1's Pat Kiernan.
- In an episode of the sitcom 30 Rock, the character Liz Lemon mentions that one of her fears is having her picture shown on NY1 after dying alone in her apartment.
- In Season 1 Episode 8 of Showtime's Billions, Pat Kiernan breaks news on NY1.

=== Podcasts ===
- Pat Kiernan appeared on a taping of the Doug Loves Movies podcast starring Doug Benson at the Gramercy Theatre on October 23, 2011. The episode, which also featured actor Keith Powell as well as comics Jim Gaffigan and Michael Ian Black, was released onto the iTunes Store three days later.

== See also ==
- Media in New York City
- News 12 Networks – a similar group of 24-hour regional cable news channels operated by Cablevision.
- FiOS1 – a similar defunct group of 24-hour regional cable news channels operated by Verizon FiOS.
- Spectrum News – a group of 24-hour regional cable news channels operated by Charter Communications; NY1 is the only regional news channel operated by Charter in the state of New York that does not utilize the Spectrum brand using the same stricter branding standards as its sister channels.
- CP24-a channel in Toronto (owned by Bell Globemedia) that serves the same function as NY1.
