= Alicia Vitarelli =

American news broadcaster (born 1978)

Alicia Vitarelli (born November 13, 1978) is a news anchor for 6 ABC Action News in Philadelphia. She joined the Action News team in October 2010. Alicia co anchored Action News at 4 until October 2019 with Brian Taff and Sharrie Williams. She currently is a co anchor of Action News at 5 along with Rick Williams and Sharrie Williams. On occasion, Alicia teams up with NJ 101.5 radio host Dennis Malloy to cook up Italian specialties for a weekend cooking show called A Roma Aroma. In 2023, she started co-anchoring the new Action News at 10am with Alicia Vitarelli, Alyana Gomez and Nydia Han.

She previously worked for News 12 New Jersey, where she was the morning and afternoon anchor for two and a half years. She was also the producer and host of Buck Wild, a weekly bargain-hunting segment that aired on Wednesdays.

She has also worked as an anchor and reporter for Time Warner cable network NY1, a 24-hour channel in New York City. Vitarelli graduated from Villanova University with degrees in communications, Spanish and theatre, and has a master's degree in broadcast journalism from the Medill School of Journalism at Northwestern University. She is married to Matthew Pantaleno.

On Monday, August 19, 2013, she announced on air that she and her husband were expecting their first child in January 2014.
