= Inside City Hall =

- Genre: Talk/News program
- Country of origin: United States

Production
- Camera setup: Multi-Camera
- Running time: 60 minutes Live-to-tape

Original release
- Network: NY1
- Release: 1992

Inside City Hall is an American political talk show that appears on the 24-hour cable-news television channel NY1. The show's format and topics focus primarily on political issues concerning New York City, but it extends into other issues, such as social, economic, and education topics affecting New York City. The current host is former New York Daily News columnist Errol Louis. Inside City Hall broadcasts live Monday - Friday from 7:00 PM to 8:00 PM and is repeated at 11:00 PM.

== Host ==
Inside City Hall was hosted by Dominic Carter and Andrew Kirtzman for many years until Kirtzman left New York 1 in 2002 to become political reporter and host of "Kirtzman and Company" for WCBS-TV. In 2009, Carter was arrested for domestic assault and NY1 did not renew his contract. His eventual replacement was current host Errol Louis. Josh Robin fills in occasionally as a guest host.

== Recurring segments ==
=== Mondays with the Mayor ===
Mondays with the Mayor segment airs every Monday and consists of a one-on-one interview with Mayor Bill de Blasio to discuss issues within city government. Questions are taken from members of the audience via Twitter.

=== Consultants Corner ===
Consultants Corner is a segment that airs every Monday. This is a debate format in which two Democrat and two Republican political consultants discuss current political topics. Typically the segment includes each consultant grading, with and A - F, an elected official's handling of a current incident.

=== Wise Guys ===
Wise Guys is a segment that airs on the Tuesday episode. This segment consists of the host discussing current news with three former prominent elected officials, former US Senator Al D'Amato, and former Governor of New York Eliot Spitzer. Former New York City mayor Ed Koch and former New York State Comptroller Carl McCall had been a permanent guests. A guest panelist occasionally is fills in for one of the three regulars. "Guest wiseguys" have included Betsy McCaughey, Elizabeth Holtzman, Fernando Ferrer, Peter Vallone, Sr., Tom Ognibene, Eliot Spitzer, Adolfo Carrión, Jr., Michael Grimm, Vito Fossella, David Paterson, C. Virginia Fields, Joseph J. DioGuardi, Ruth Messinger, Melinda Katz, Betsy Gotbaum, John Faso, Judith H. Hope, and Gary Ackerman.

=== Political Rundown ===
Political Rundown segment airs on Wednesday. Guardian Angels founder and radio talk show host Curtis Sliwa faces-off with El Diario columnist Gerson Borrero in which they share 60 seconds to comment on a given topic.

=== The Louis Letter ===
The Louis Letter segment airs on Thursday and consists of host Errol Louis giving a personal commentary on a subject.

=== Sound-Off ===
Sound-Off segment airs on Thursday and consists of an in-depth look at an issue related to city, state, or national politics.

=== The Friday Conversation ===
The Friday Conversation segment airs on Friday and consists of an interview focused on one particular current event, commonly related to a forthcoming book, mini-series, or documentary.

=== Reporters Round Table ===
Reporters Round Table segment airs on Friday and consists of four reporters discussing issues that are affecting New York City. Part of the segment reporters identifies one specific topic that will be reported on in the near future.
