= Lorraine Cortés-Vázquez =

American politician (born 1950)

Commissioner of the New York City Department for the Aging
- In office April 15, 2019 – 2026
- Mayor: Bill De Blasio; Eric Adams; Zohran Mamdani
- Preceded by: Donna Corrado
- Succeeded by: Lisa Scott-McKenzie

63rd Secretary of State of New York
- In office January 1, 2007 – September 1, 2010
- Governor: Eliot Spitzer; David Paterson
- Preceded by: Chris Jacobs
- Succeeded by: Ruth Noemí Colón

Personal details
- Born: October 18, 1950 (age 75) New York City, New York, U.S.
- Party: Democratic
- Education: Hunter College (BA); New York University (MPA)

Lorraine A. Cortés-Vázquez is an American government official who served as the commissioner of the New York City Department for the Aging, and previously served as the 65th Secretary of State of New York, appointed by Governor Eliot Spitzer and serving in the cabinets of both Spitzer and his successor, David Paterson.

== Early life and education ==
Cortés-Vázquez was born in East Harlem, New York City. She earned her undergraduate degree from Hunter College, and a Master of Public Administration from the Robert F. Wagner Graduate School of Public Service at New York University. She has pursued further studies at Columbia University's School of Non-Profit Management, as well as at the John F. Kennedy School of Government at Harvard University in Cambridge, Massachusetts.

== Career ==
A former vice president for Government and Public Affairs with Cablevision, she was chief of staff to former New York Assemblyman Roberto Ramirez. From 2001 to 2007, she served on the New York State Board of Regents. Since April 2019, she has been serving as Commissioner for the Department for the Aging under multiple mayors — New York City Mayor Bill de Blasio, Eric Adams, and Zohran Mamdani.

As Secretary of State, she was formally responsible with accepting Spitzer's resignation from the governorship on March 17, 2008, due to a sex scandal. She also accepted the resignation of U.S. Senator Hillary Clinton when she resigned after she accepted the position of United States Secretary of State.

Cortés-Vázquez serves as Executive Vice President for Multicultural Markets and Engagement for the AARP, resuming employment in the non-profit sector which included previous stints as executive director of Aspira of New York during the 1990s and president of the Hispanic Federation.

In 2020, Cortés-Vázquez was appointed by Mayor Bill De Blasio and confirmed by the New York State Senate to serve on the board of the Metropolitan Transportation Authority.

== Personal life ==
Cortés-Vázquez is of Puerto Rican and Dominican descent and is the second person of Puerto Rican ancestry to serve as Secretary of State in a state of the Union, preceded only by Pedro Cortés, of Pennsylvania.

Political offices
Preceded by Christopher Jacobs	Secretary of State of New York; 2007–2010	Succeeded by Ruth Noemí Colón
