= Rossana Rosado =

American politician

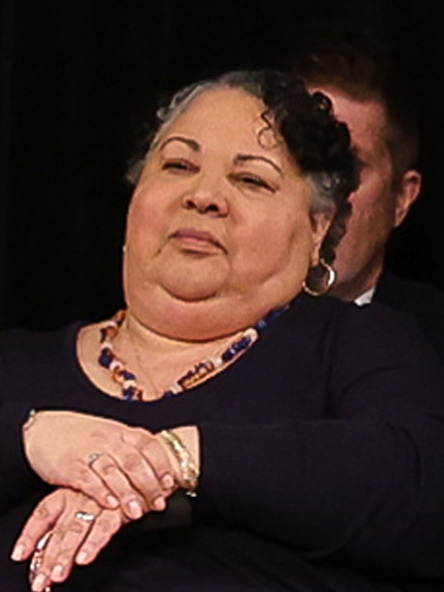
- Rosado in 2025

13th Commissioner of the New York State Division of Criminal Justice Services
- Incumbent
- Assumed office February 14, 2022; Acting: November 4, 2021 – February 14, 2022
- Governor: Kathy Hochul
- Preceded by: Michael C. Green

66th Secretary of State of New York
- In office February 3, 2016 – November 4, 2021; Acting: February 3, 2016 – June 16, 2016
- Governor: Andrew Cuomo; Kathy Hochul
- Preceded by: Cesar Perales
- Succeeded by: Brendan Hughes (acting)

Personal details
- Born: August 20, 1961 (age 64) New York City, New York, U.S.
- Party: Democratic
- Education: Pace University (BA)

Rossana Rosado (born August 20, 1961) is the 13th Commissioner of the New York State Division of Criminal Justice Services appointed by Governor Kathy Hochul in November 2021. She is also an American newspaper editor, publisher and producer who served as the Secretary of State of New York. On February 3, 2016, Governor Andrew Cuomo appointed Rosado as the Secretary of State. She was unanimously confirmed by the New York State Senate on June 15, 2016. She attended Pace University, where she earned a B.A. in journalism.

== Career ==
Rossana Rosado began her career at El Diario La Prensa starting as a journalist in the early 1980s. She then was publisher and CEO of the newspaper company in 1999. She was the first woman to serve as an editor and publisher of the second largest Spanish-language newspaper in the country, El Diario La Prensa. In 1992, Rosado was appointed vice president for public affairs at the Health and Hospitals Corporation for the City of New York by Mayors David Dinkins and Rudy Giuliani. Rosado has served on the board of the Port Authority of New York and New Jersey from 2012 and 2015, and is member of the college's foundation board of trustees since 2012.

== Awards ==
Rosado has won an Emmy for producing public service announcements that highlighted organizations that helped children in need. She also won the STAR award from the NY Women's Agenda, the Peabody Award for Journalism, and the NY Press Club President's award.

== Personal life ==
Rosado is married and has two children and she currently lives in White Plains, New York.

Political offices
Preceded by Cesar A. Perales	Secretary of State of New York; 2016–2021	Succeeded by Brendan Hughes; Acting
