= Dominic Carter (journalist) =

American news reporter

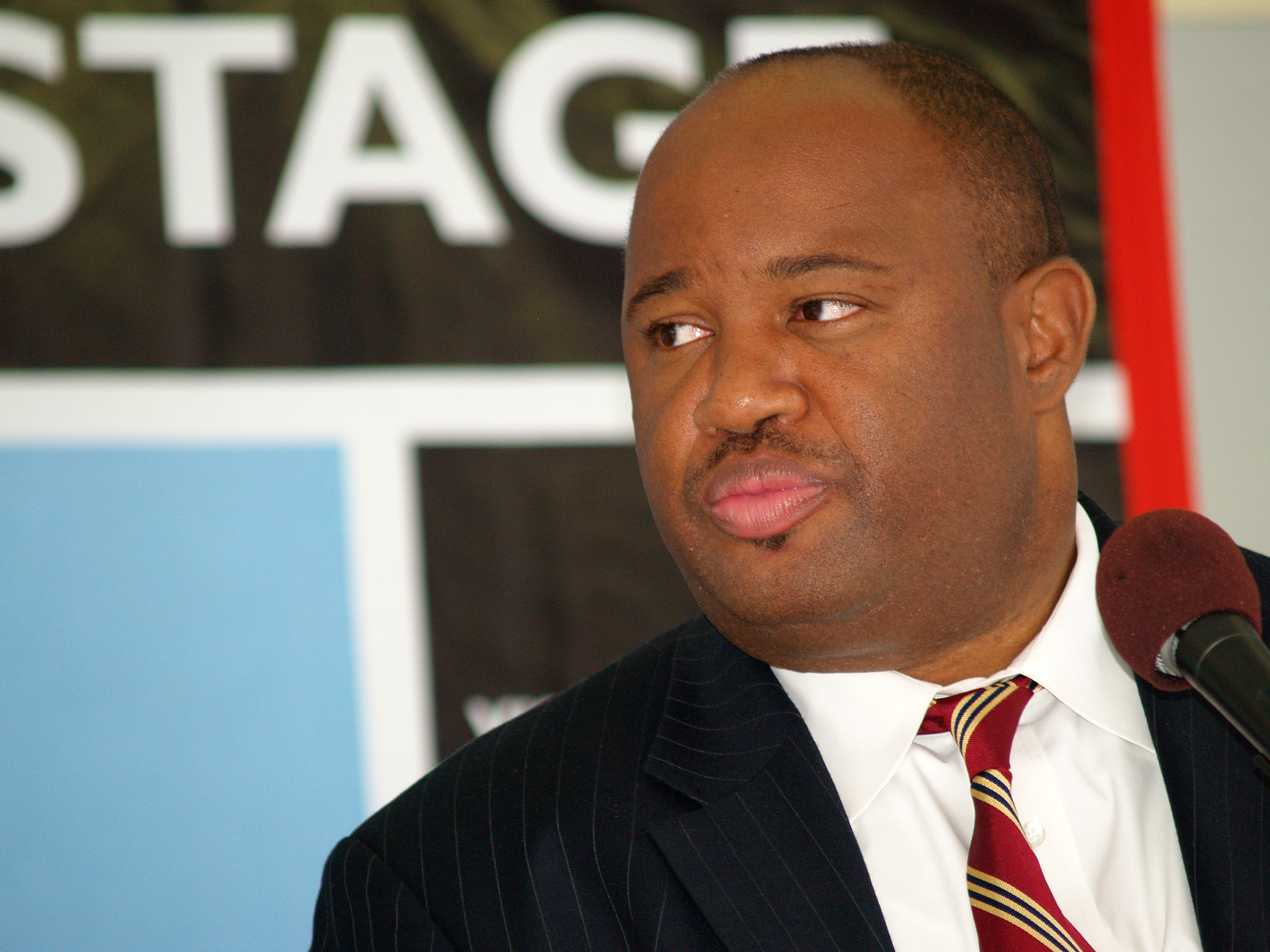
- Born: June 18, 1964 (age 62)
- Education: State University of New York College at Cortland (B.A.); Syracuse University

Dominic Carter (born June 18, 1964) is an American news reporter and political commentator for Verizon Fios/RNN News which airs in NY, NJ, DE, and CT. He is also a blogger for The Huffington Post, and does radio work for WABC.

== Education ==
Carter grew up in The Bronx, NY. After high school, he attended the State University of New York at Cortland where he received a BA in journalism. Later he attended graduate school at Syracuse University. He and his wife have two children.

== Broadcasting career ==
Though best known for his current work as a television news journalist, Carter began his broadcast career in 1988 as a radio reporter. He spent most of that year covering Jesse Jackson's presidential campaign. Later, his work as a radio reporter brought him a measure of prominence when he interviewed Nelson Mandela during latter's trip to New York.

In 1992, Carter made the move to television as a reporter and anchor with the newly launched New York 1, a Time Warner station in New York. Carter's position as host of the news and commentary show Inside City Hall gave him access to a wider array of interviewees, including Cardinal John Joseph O'Connor, former president Bill Clinton, South African president Nelson Mandela, Mexican president Vicente Fox, former secretary of state Condoleezza Rice, Hillary Clinton, and congressman Charles B. Rangel. In 2006, Carter made national news as the moderator of a series of statewide debates in New York State, which included then-senator Hillary Clinton. During the course of those debates, Clinton acknowledged for the first time that she was considering a candidacy for the presidency.

Carter's work has sent him abroad to Japan, Israel, Somalia, and the Persian Gulf. In addition, he has appeared as a guest on Fox News Channel, CNN, and MSNBC. On December 21, 2008, he appeared as a member of a guest panel on CBS News' Face The Nation

In 2008, the Time Warner Station expanded its news coverage during the political conventions, sending Carter to both the Democratic and Republican conventions. At the same time, the station's coverage of those events was made available through Time Warner Cable to customers outside the New York City.

As of 2023, Carter is heard weeknights on WABC Radio from Midnight - 1 AM ET. The last segment of his program used to feature talk show host, Frank Morano, who followed him nightly.

== Books ==
In 2007, Carter released No Momma's Boy (iUniverse, May 1, 2007), a memoir that documents Carter's troubled relationship with his mother, who had been clinically diagnosed with paranoid schizophrenia. The book describes Carter's journey from the public school system and the housing projects of New York City to his career in journalism. Carter has traveled across the United States speaking about his life and book.

As of 2021, Carter is heard on WABC 770AM from 4:00-5:00PM on Sunday, and on weekday earliest mornings from midnight to 1:00 AM.

== Personal life ==
In 2009, Carter was convicted of a misdemeanor, attempted assault of his wife, but won his case on appeal. In a 3-0 decision, the appellate court ruled the case should have never gone to trial.

Media offices
Preceded by Show started	Host of Inside City Hall; 1992–2009	Succeeded by Errol Louis
