= January 5–6, 2025 United States blizzard =

North American winter storm in 2025

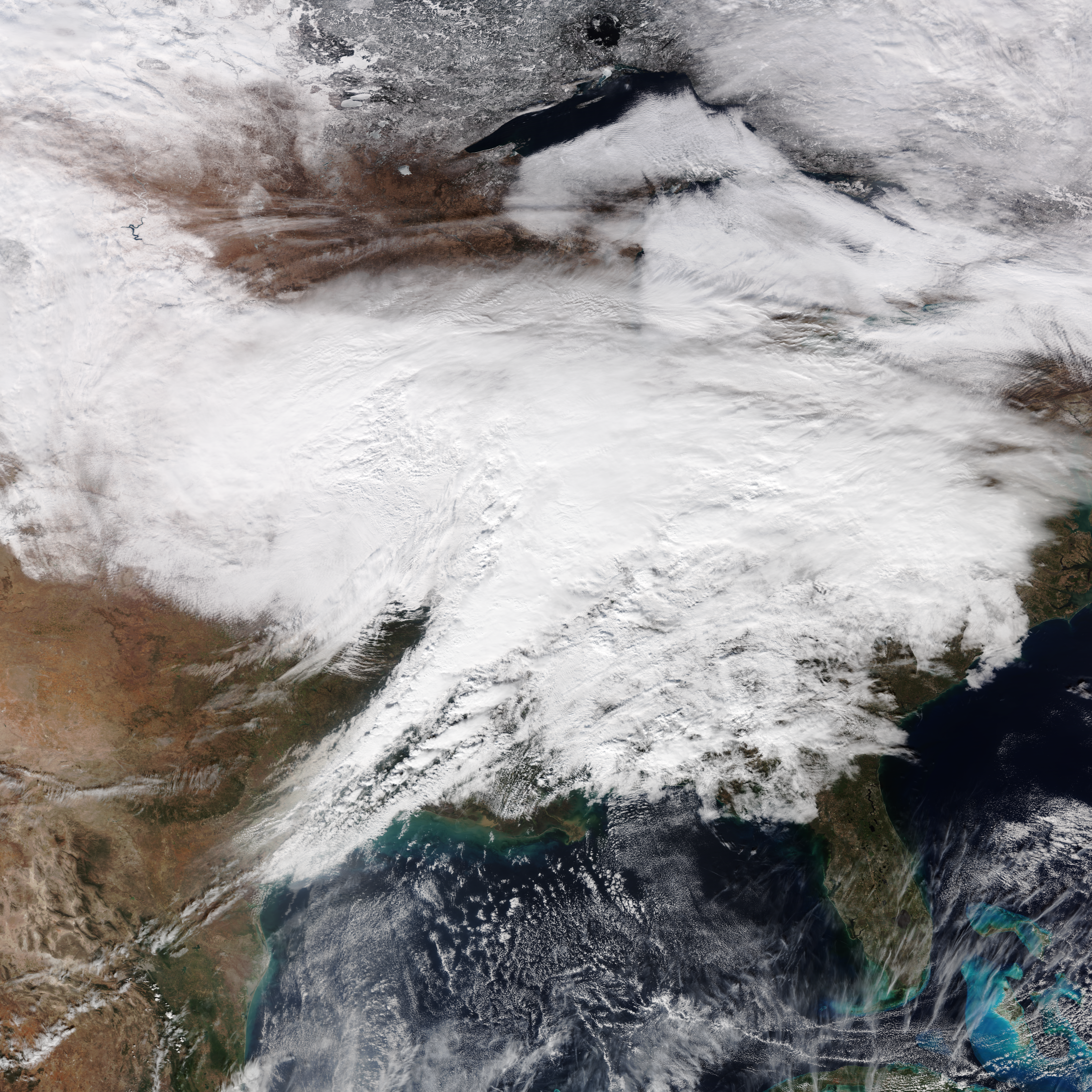
- Satellite image of the blizzard over the High Plains on January 5

Meteorological history
- Formed: January 3, 2025
- Exited land: January 7, 2025
- Dissipated: January 9, 2025

Category 2 "Minor" blizzard
- Regional snowfall index: 3.02 (NOAA)
- Lowest pressure: 976 mbar (hPa); 28.82 inHg
- Max. snowfall: Snowfall – 20.5 in (52 cm) in Chapman, Kansas; Ice – 0.79 in (20 mm) near Burnt Chimney, Virginia

Tornado outbreak
- Tornadoes: 14
- Max. rating: EF2 tornado
- Duration: January 3–5, 2025
- Highest winds: Tornadic – 132 mph (212 km/h) (Dean, Louisiana EF2 on January 6)
- Largest hail: 1 inch (2.5 cm) in Chatham, Mississippi

Overall effects
- Fatalities: 10
- Damage: $5.426 million
- Areas affected: Pacific Northwest, Rocky Mountains, High Plains, Ohio Valley, Deep South, Mid-Atlantic states
- Power outages: >365,000
- Part of the 2024–25 North American winter

From January 5 to 6, 2025, a significant and expansive winter weather event, unofficially nicknamed Winter Storm Blair by the Weather Channel and media outlets, or often known as the Blizzard of 2025, produced blizzard conditions across the High Plains, as well as a long swath of accumulating snow and ice storm to the eastern half of the United States. Beginning on January 3, the system first made landfall along the northern West Coast of the United States before tracking southeastward, bringing severe winter conditions to multiple regions all the way to the Mid-Atlantic states and prompting numerous state emergency declarations. The storm system also produced 2025's first tornado, which touched down in northern California, before producing several more tornadoes within the Deep South a few days later on January 5. Most impacts from the storm ended by January 6 after the winter storm moved offshore into the Atlantic Ocean.

Winter storm advisories issued by the National Weather Service (NWS) throughout January 3 extended approximately 1,500 mi (2,400 km) from western Kansas to West Virginia, marking one of the most extensive winter weather warning areas in the 2024–25 North American winter season up to the beginning of 2025. Approximately 365,000 people were estimated to have lost power as a result of the blizzard, and the city of Richmond, Virginia, experienced a water outage and ensuing crisis due to damage sustained to water distribution facilities from the storm. The winter storm was also deadly, as at least 10 people were confirmed to have been killed as a result.

== Meteorological history ==
=== Blizzard ===
Map plotting the storm's track and intensity, according to the Saffir–Simpson scale Map key Saffir–Simpson scale Tropical depression (≤38 mph, ≤62 km/h) Tropical storm (39–73 mph, 63–118 km/h) Category 1 (74–95 mph, 119–153 km/h) Category 2 (96–110 mph, 154–177 km/h) Category 3 (111–129 mph, 178–208 km/h) Category 4 (130–156 mph, 209–251 km/h) Category 5 (≥157 mph, ≥252 km/h) Unknown Storm type Tropical cyclone Subtropical cyclone Extratropical cyclone, remnant low, tropical disturbance, or monsoon depression

A vigorous upper-level trough crossed the West Coast on January 3, initiating a dynamic pattern that led to a significant winter storm across the contiguous U.S. The Weather Prediction Center (WPC) tracked the disturbance as it moved southeastward through the Rockies, where lee cyclogenesis near the Texas–New Mexico border produced a rapidly deepening surface low by January 4–5. Simultaneously, strong mid-level jet flow—clocking around 60 kn (69 mph)–60 kn (69 mph) at 500 mb—promoted large-scale ascent and supported wet-bulb advection into the High Plains, triggering widespread snowfall and ice. Arctic cold air dammed southward behind the system, aiding in snow‐ and ice‐producing frontal structure and enhancing white‑out and blizzard formation from Kansas into the Mid‑Atlantic by January 6.

By January 4–5, surface analyses depicted a classic baroclinic zone: a well-defined warm front north across the Midwest and a pronounced cold front trailing southwest behind the low, intersecting a deepening dry‑cold wedge. Moist air feeding northward from the Gulf of Mexico fueled heavy snow and freezing rain across the Plains and Ohio Valley. In areas such as Kansas, Missouri, and Indiana, snowfall exceeded 6 in (15 cm)–12 in (30 cm), with some parts of the Midwest receiving over a foot of snow. Significant ice accumulations, from 0.25 in (0.64 cm) to 0.75 in (1.9 cm), were observed in southern Illinois, southern Missouri, and northern Kentucky, resulting in widespread power disruptions and hazardous travel conditions.

The storm reached peak severity on January 5, when blizzard conditions—defined by wind gusts over 35 mph (56 km/h), blowing snow, and visibility under a quarter-mile—were reported across the High Plains. The tight pressure gradient around the strengthening cyclone, along with a robust low-level jet, drove wind gusts exceeding 50 mph (80 km/h), especially across Kansas and Nebraska. By January 6, the system had progressed into the Mid‑Atlantic, tapering off by evening as snowfall transitioned to sleet or rain in the eastern sectors. The storm caused widespread travel disruption—cancelling over 1,300 flights and leading to hundreds of thousands of power outages across multiple states. Ten fatalities and significant economic impacts were reported.

=== Tornado Outbreak ===
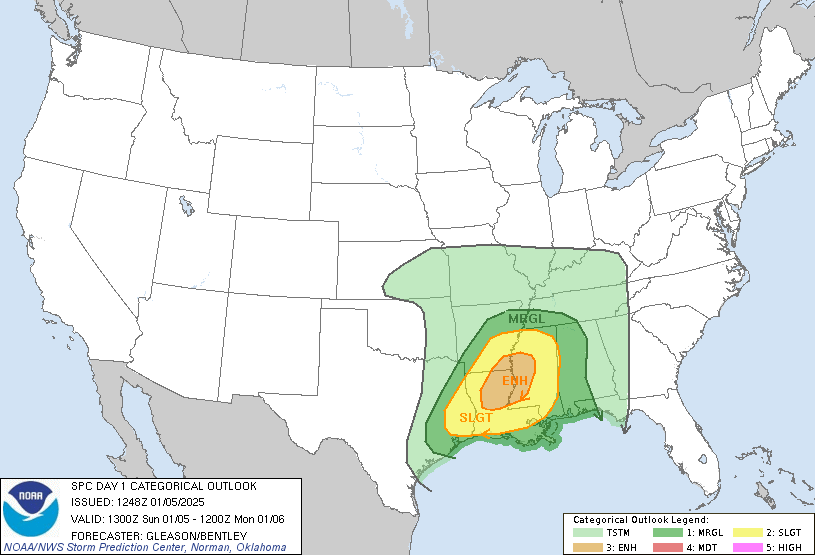
The Storm Prediction Center (SPC)'s forecast for January 5, with an enhanced risk area within the Lower Mississippi River Valley

As the expansive winter storm moved east across the southern U.S., it triggered a corridor of severe thunderstorms ahead of and along its southern frontal boundary. On January 5, entrenched Arctic air to the north and persistent Gulf moisture to the south produced a sharp frontal gradient across the Deep South, including Louisiana, Mississippi, and Alabama—regions classified under a Level 3 (Enhanced) severe weather threat by the Storm Prediction Center that day, with expectations for wind damage and a few tornadoes possible despite overall marginal instability.

Although thermodynamic energy was modest, strong low-level wind shear associated with the advancing cold front—with an increasingly veering low-level jet during the afternoon—supported rotating updrafts in an otherwise cool environment. Converging Gulf moisture and frontal lifting generated embedded thunderstorms capable of brief tornadoes. These storms were most concentrated over northern Louisiana and western Mississippi, where mesoanalysis highlighted marginal CAM-supported discrete cells and line segments capable of producing damaging winds and occasional tornadoes.

The primary tornado activity occurred during the evening hours of January 5, predominantly as isolated EF0–EF2 tornadoes, scattered across areas such as southern Arkansas, northern Mississippi, and northeastern Louisiana—coincident with the cold front’s southward trajectory. The environment favored gust fronts and broken-line mode with embedded circulations rather than classic supercell structures, and no tornado outbreak in terms of numerous or long-track tornadoes was observed. Forecast discussions emphasized the threat as focused and transient: a brief period of enhanced tornado risk embedded within a broader winter storm context, with damaging wind the more widespread hazard.

== Preparations ==
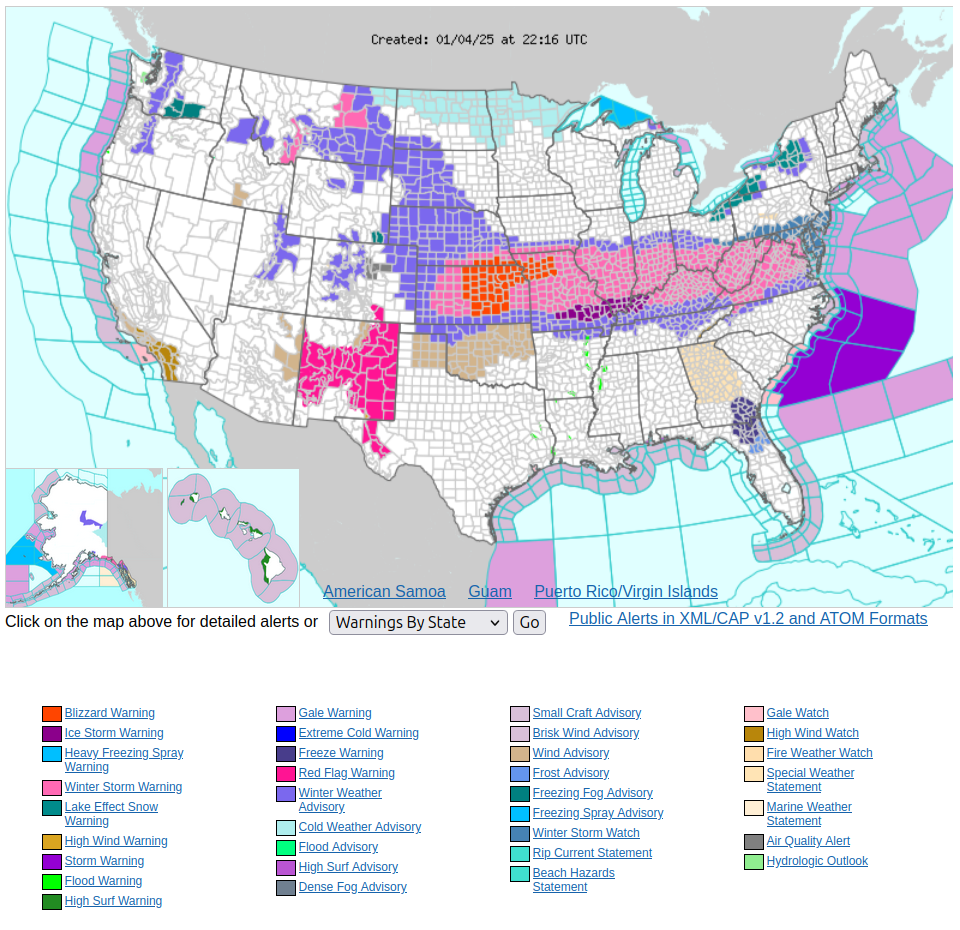
Map highlighting active weather alerts across the United States on the evening of January 4

Major U.S. airlines, including United Airlines, American Airlines, Southwest Airlines, and Delta Air Lines, implemented fee waivers for flight changes during the event. Numerous Amtrak lines were also cancelled across the country from January 5–7.

=== Great Plains ===
Starting on January 4th, the National Weather Service offices in Wichita, Topeka, Omaha/Valley, and Kansas City/Pleasant Hill issued blizzard warnings forecasting 6 in (15 cm)–12 in (30 cm) of snow, wind gusts over 40 mph (64 km/h), and periods of near-zero visibility. In Wichita and Topeka, city emergency managers activated warming shelters, staged emergency vehicles, and coordinated with utility companies for potential power outages. In the Kansas City metro, local governments on both sides of the state line declared snow emergencies, pre-positioned plow fleets, and enforced parking restrictions on snow emergency routes to facilitate clearing operations. In St. Joseph, city public works deployed salt trucks and prepared to close steep roads, while MoDOT closed portions of I‑29 and warned against non-essential travel. The Nebraska Department of Transportation (NDOT) pre-treated highways in the southeast portion of the state and staged plows along I‑80 in advance of the storm.

=== Midwest & Ohio River Valley ===
In the Midwest and Ohio Valley, which was under winter storm and ice storm warnings, preparations focused on the forecast for heavy snow north of the I‑70 corridor and significant icing to the south. In Columbia and St. Louis, city officials declared snow emergencies, MoDOT pre-treated bridges (especially Mississippi River crossings), and snowplows were staged in advance of the storm. In Springfield and Champaign, IDOT coordinated salt and plow operations along I‑55 and I‑72, while local governments opened warming shelters for vulnerable residents. Following snow warnings of 6 in (15 cm)–12 in (30 cm), Jacksonville and South Jacksonville, IL, issued snow emergencies, and emphasized that vehicles parked on emergency snow routes would be towed. In Terre Haute, Bloomington, and Indianapolis, INDOT pre-treated interstate corridors (I‑70, I‑65, I‑74) and city emergency management activated warming centers and coordinated response crews.

On 4 January, Governor of Kentucky Andy Beshear issued a state of emergency in anticipation of dangerous road conditions, widespread power outages, and sustained freezing temperatures. In Louisvillle and Lexington, local governments canceled schools, KYTC staged crews along I‑64 and I‑75, and LG&E prepared for potential power outages due to ice accretion on power lines. The Christian Wayside Mission and the Salvation Army in Louisville opened warming shelters for the homeless. In Cincinnati and Dayton, city agencies coordinated with ODOT to salt bridges, deploy plows, and activate snow emergency parking restrictions, while Duke Energy and DP&L staged line crews in case of outages.

=== Central Appalachians & Mid-Atlantic ===
In the Mid-Atlantic and central Appalachians, winter storm warnings and winter weather advisories were issued for areas expecting 4 in (10 cm)–8 in (20 cm) of snow and ice accumulations up to 0.5 in (1.3 cm). On 5 January, Governor of West Virginia Jim Justice issued a state of emergency in all 55 counties of the state. In West Virginia, state and local agencies prepared for hazardous mountain travel; Charleston and Huntington opened warming centers, while the WVDOT treated I‑64, I‑77, and I‑79 in anticipation of slick conditions. On January 3rd, Governor of Virginia Glenn Youngkin issued a state of emergency for the entirety of the state. In Virginia, VDOT staged plow crews along I‑81 and mountain passes, and Richmond, Charlottesville, and Harrisonburg city officials opened shelters and warned residents of potential power outages from ice.

In the Washington-Baltimore metropolitan area, both MDOT and DDOT pre-treated major commuter routes, including I‑95, I‑695, and US 50, while local jurisdictions announced snow emergency parking restrictions to keep plow routes clear. Multiple Maryland school districts issued schedule changes for students in order to avoid the winter weather. Governor of Maryland Wes Moore issued a State of Preparedness extending from 5–6 January. In Philadelphia and Wilmington, PennDOT and DelDOT applied brine to highways and bridges, focused especially on river crossings, and warned of treacherous travel conditions due to the potential for mixed precipitation and icing. Schools in Philadelphia closed on January 6 due to the snow.

=== Red River Valley & Northwoods ===
In the Red River Valley and adjacent Northwoods area, including northeastern North Dakota and northern Minnesota, authorities issued cold weather advisories ahead of the early January cold wave that followed the storm system. These advisories warned residents of wind chills dropping to −40 °F (−40 °C) or lower, particularly overnight where sparse snow cover exacerbated the chill. Local emergency management and tribal health departments coordinated opening warming shelters in rural communities and towns like Grand Forks and Bemidji, and issued guidance to check on vulnerable populations, including the elderly and those without heat. Utility companies in the region also advised on preventing frozen pipes and vehicle breakdowns due to the extreme temperatures. These preparations were precautionary in nature, as the region was not under heavy snow or blizzard warning products, but was instead bracing for record arctic cold in the aftermath of the storm system.

== Impact ==
Maximum snow, ice, and sleet accumulations by U.S. state according to the National Weather Service
| State | Maximum snow | Maximum ice | Maximum sleet |
|---|---|---|---|
| Delaware | 12.0 inches (30 cm) | —N/a | —N/a |
| Washington D.C. | 8.3 inches (21 cm) | —N/a | —N/a |
| Illinois | 9.5 inches (24 cm) | 0.5 inches (1.3 cm) | 2.0 inches (5.1 cm) |
| Indiana | 12.0 inches (30 cm) | 0.5 inches (1.3 cm) | —N/a |
| Kansas | 20.5 inches (52 cm) | 0.66 inches (1.7 cm) | —N/a |
| Kentucky | 9.0 inches (23 cm) | 0.75 inches (1.9 cm) | —N/a |
| Maryland | 12.4 inches (31 cm) | —N/a | —N/a |
| Missouri | 13.0 inches (33 cm) | 0.63 inches (1.6 cm) | 4.0 inches (10 cm) |
| Nebraska | 12.0 inches (30 cm) | —N/a | —N/a |
| New Jersey | 8.0 inches (20 cm) | —N/a | —N/a |
| North Carolina | —N/a | 0.15 inches (0.38 cm) | —N/a |
| Ohio | 10.0 inches (25 cm) | —N/a | —N/a |
| Virginia | 11.3 inches (29 cm) | 0.75 inches (1.9 cm) | —N/a |
| West Virginia | 11.0 inches (28 cm) | 0.52 inches (1.3 cm) | —N/a |

=== West ===
After making landfall along the northern West Coast of the continental United States, valley areas in Eastern Washington experienced freezing rain during the afternoon and evening of 3 January, while widespread snowfall accumulated in mountainous regions across Washington and Montana.

In Northern California, the winter storm system produced a tornado near Paynes Creek and Shingletown, which FOX Weather reported was the first United States tornado in 2025. The tornado was confirmed by the National Weather Service's Sacramento office at approximately 5:30 pm PST who issued a tornado warning for Shasta and Tehama counties, and was captured on video by a University of California, San Diego camera. The tornado resulted in no reported damage or injuries. The winter storm also brought heavy snow and strong winds to the northern California region, and produced quarter-size hail at higher elevations.

Travel advisories were issued in Montana due to heavy snowfall in mountainous areas in conjunction with strong wind gusts. Nearly all regions of Montana were impacted by heavy snowfall, with cold weather advisories issued across northeast Montana.

=== High Plains ===
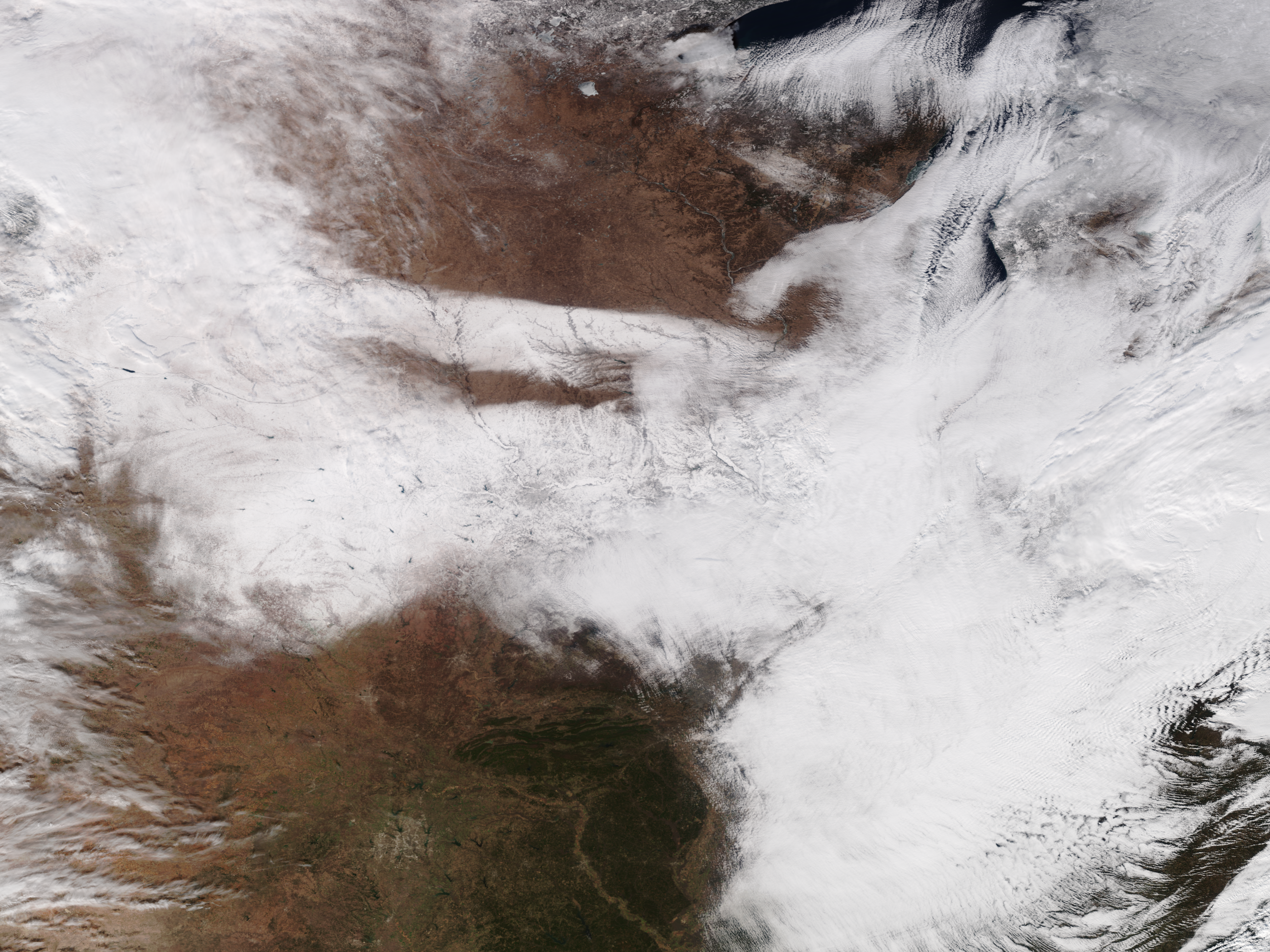
Wide swath of snowfall from the blizzard that struck the central U.S. on January 5–6, 2025

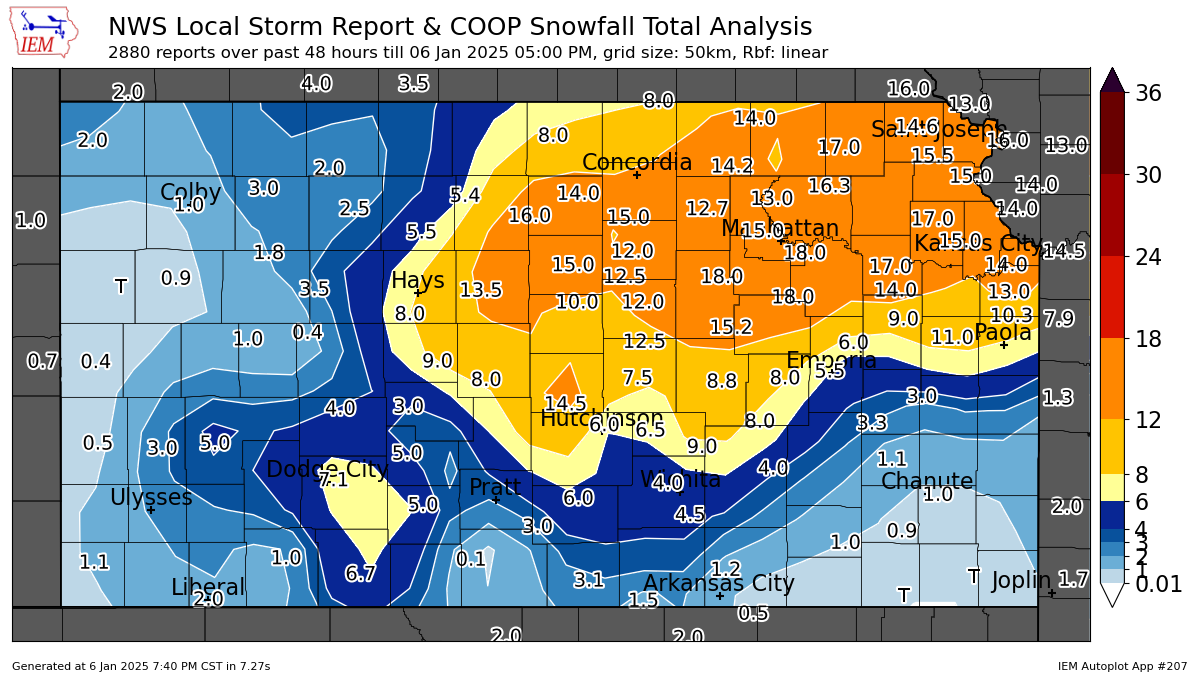
A map of the total snowfall across Kansas between January 4th to January 6th, 2025

On 4 January, Utah was impacted by a "potent but quick moving cold front" that brought snowfall and 50 mph wind gusts in the Wasatch Front region, leading to travel advisories along several international and state highways in central and northern Utah. Freezing rain fell in Kansas and Missouri, which led to thick road icing and several dozen traffic accidents. In Kansas, a vehicle rollover occurred on US-54 in Wichita, while several more accidents occurred near Salina. Governor of Kansas Laura Kelly issued a state of disaster emergency amid the storm's precipitation causing several traffic collisions and road closures with most major highways and interstates in the Kansas City area being closed for the 48 hours surrounding the storm.

During the afternoon, the Kansas City Chiefs were delayed a few hours from departing the Kansas City International Airport due to airport closure by NOTAM, as a result of the winter storm producing freezing drizzle on the airfield. This came before their game against the Denver Broncos the next day.

On 5 January, a woman was found dead in Kansas City after being reported missing the prior day as severe winter weather impacted the region. The Kansas Highway Patrol reported that one person was killed and another injured due to road icing, after their vehicle collided with a jackknifed trailer while driving eastbound on US-56.

=== Midwest ===
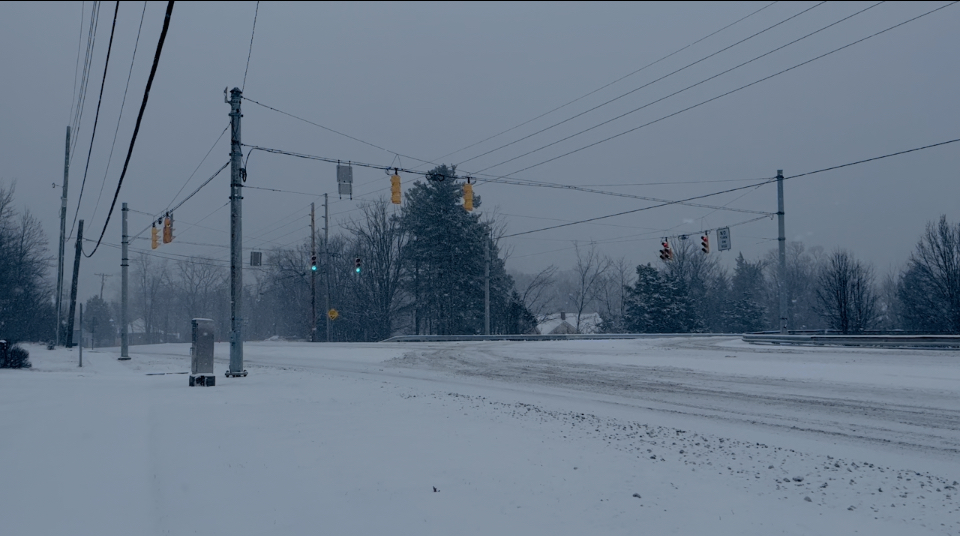
The winter storm in Monroe County, Indiana on January 4

Cincinnati/Northern Kentucky International Airport received 8 in (20 cm) of snowfall— a record amount— leading to dozens of cancelled flights.

On 6 January, the Indiana State Police stated that they received reports of 259 vehicle collisions and reports of 271 vehicles that had slid off roadways. The Indianapolis District state police reported that 151 crashes were reported— of which 12 resulted in injuries— and that they had to respond to 100 disabled or stuck vehicles.

At 6:30 PM EST on 5 January, readings from PowerOutage.us indicated that 41,284 customers were suffering from power outages, with the most present in Warren and Henderson County. On 6 January, half of Magoffin County customers were without power due to downed power lines.

The storm resulted in Mammoth Caves National Park closing.

=== East Coast ===
On 6 January, the Maryland State Police reported that they had received 475 service calls between 1 AM EST to midday, which included 156 unattended vehicles and 123 crashes. Baltimore received 6.6 in (17 cm) of snow, which was the biggest snowfall there in three years.

Virginia State Police reported 248 crashes requiring their response, noting that not all accidents were necessarily related to the winter storm. Reagan National Airport shut down their runways late on January 6 due to the snowfall.

On both 6 and 7 January, the United States Office of Personnel Management closed federal offices in the Washington DC area and put maximum telework for employees in effect.

Across the Philadelphia metropolitan area, accumulations were heaviest across the southern parts of the region, with only 1.8 in (4.6 cm) of snow in Philadelphia. At Philadelphia International Airport, over 380 flights were delayed, and 80 were cancelled. In the Atlantic City area, and along the Jersey Shore, however, up to 7 in (18 cm) of snow were recorded. In New York City, the January 6 snowfall total was 0.9 in (2.3 cm).

==== Richmond water outage ====
In January 2025, the city of Richmond, Virginia and its surrounding localities suffered water distribution outages due to a blizzard which impacted much of the United States. The issues started on the morning of Monday, January 6, and were mostly resolved by Saturday, January 11. The localities' water systems are interconnected, meaning that problems in Richmond City led to problems across the region. Richmond was the most impacted, followed by Henrico to the immediate north. Henrico is bordered on the north by Hanover County and on the west by Goochland County, which also faced some impacts. Chesterfield County, to the south of Richmond, was impacted very little, as they were able to effectively switch water sources and have very few customers who directly receive water from the city.During the crisis itself, boil-water advisories were issued for all of Richmond and Henrico, parts of Hanover and Goochland, and for 27 people in Chesterfield. These regional partners had to adapt by shutting off their own water supply from Richmond, which caused impacts there, particularly in Henrico County.

Communication issues between the city and Henrico County, and between the city and its water customers, contributed to response difficulties. Impacts were widely felt, with hospitals, schools, and sporting events being among those facing cancellations and service interruptions. Cooperation among localities and between localities and the private sector helped to mitigate some of the issues.

The event had political implications, because the Virginia General Assembly had to recess until Monday, January 13; they had originally been scheduled to start their session on Wednesday. Governor Glenn Youngkin activated the Virginia National Guard, which was made easier because of the state of emergency that had been declared earlier in the week. He called for an after-action review to more fully understand the crisis. Further, Jason Miyares, the Attorney General of Virginia, said that he would aggressively prosecute price gouging. The outage happened roughly a week into newly elected mayor Danny Avula's administration, and multiple commentators discussed his performance.

Full water service was returned by Thursday and Friday, January 9 and 10, but the boil-water advisory was not lifted until the afternoon of Saturday, January 11 due to testing requirements mandated by the Virginia Department of Health's (VDH) Office of Drinking Water (ODW). These were also required for Henrico County.

Multiple state regulators and outside reviewers pointed to a lack of speedy information-sharing as contributing to the crisis, and the crisis put the issue at the head of legislators' minds, although people had brought up the issue beforehand.

Multiple internal and external investigations were held to determine the causes of the crisis and the next steps for the affected localities, the region as a whole, and the state. Richmond's audit identified infrastructure, communication, and planning struggles as the main cause of the crisis. The reports of Hanover and Henrico focused on how communication failures from the city hampered their ability to respond.

== Confirmed tornadoes ==
The winter storm also brought severe weather across the country, primarily in the Southeast with 14 tornadoes confirmed. Damage from the tornado outbreak totaled $637,000.

Confirmed tornadoes by Enhanced Fujita rating
| EFU | EF0 | EF1 | EF2 | EF3 | EF4 | EF5 | Total |
|---|---|---|---|---|---|---|---|
| 1 | 2 | 9 | 2 | 0 | 0 | 0 | 14 |

=== January 3 event ===
List of confirmed tornadoes – Friday, January 3, 2025 (Note: All dates are based on the local time zone where the tornado touched down; however, all times are in Coordinated Universal Time for consistency.)
| EF# | Location | County / parish | State | Start coord. | Time (UTC) | Path length | Max. width |
|---|---|---|---|---|---|---|---|
| EFU | NW of Dales | Tehama | CA | 40.3374°N 122.0899°W | 01:18–01:21 | 0.8 mi (1.3 km) | 50 yd (46 m) |
| EFU | A short-lived tornado touched down over open land, causing no reported damage. | | | | | | |

=== January 5 event ===
List of confirmed tornadoes – Sunday, January 5, 2025
| EF# | Location | County / parish | State | Start coord. | Time (UTC) | Path length | Max. width |
|---|---|---|---|---|---|---|---|
| EF1 | SE of Star City | Lincoln | AR | 33.8672°N 91.6875°W | 20:04-20:07 | 1.21 mi (1.95 km) | 300 yd (270 m) |
| EF1 | This tornado began north of AR 54 and moved northeast along the highway, damaging chicken houses and causing roof damage to two homes. It continued northeast, uprooting and snapping several trees before lifting near a barn. | | | | | | |
| EF2 | SE of Marion to S of Sulphur Springs, AR | Union, Morehouse | LA | 32.8646°N 92.191°W | 20:19–20:37 | 9.03 mi (14.53 km) | 650 yd (590 m) |
| EF2 | A high-end EF2 tornado touched down southeast of Marion and moved northeast. Numerous trees were snapped or had large branches broken. A trailer was lifted from its foundation, and debris was blown across the area with extensive vehicle damage nearby. Several homes sustained roof and carport damage, and a shop collapsed and was blown off its foundation at peak intensity. Additional roof and shed damage occurred before the tornado entered the Upper Ouachita National Wildlife Refuge. High-resolution satellite imagery showed the tornado continued northeast, crossing the Ouachita River before dissipating. | | | | | | |
| EF1 | NW of Oak Grove | West Carroll | LA | 32.9122°N 91.4734°W | 21:42–21:44 | 2.17 mi (3.49 km) | 100 yd (91 m) |
| EF1 | The roofs of a few residences were damaged, a mobile was shifted off its foundation and trees were snapped. | | | | | | |
| EF1 | S of Holly Bluff | Sharkey, Yazoo | MS | 32.77°N 90.74°W | 23:14–23:20 | 6.1 mi (9.8 km) | 450 yd (410 m) |
| EF1 | A few trees were uprooted. This tornado was confirmed in March 2025 through satellite imagery. | | | | | | |
| EF1 | NW of Aberdeen | Monroe | MS | 33.858°N 88.6242°W | 01:08–01:09 | 0.69 mi (1.11 km) | 120 yd (110 m) |
| EF1 | This brief tornado uprooted or snapped trees and caused roof damage to a house. Some power lines were also downed. | | | | | | |
| EF1 | SE of Brandon to NE of Pelahatchie | Rankin | MS | 32.2541°N 89.9184°W | 01:11–01:28 | 11.12 mi (17.90 km) | 150 yd (140 m) |
| EF1 | Several chicken houses were damaged, with debris thrown into fields. Many trees were snapped or uprooted, and power lines were downed. | | | | | | |
| EF0 | W of Vina | Franklin | AL | 34.3514°N 88.1414°W | 01:40–01:44 | 2.44 mi (3.93 km) | 158 yd (144 m) |
| EF0 | A pole barn sustained major damage to its roof and supporting beams. A mobile home sustained roof damage and had one of its windows shattered. Trees were snapped or uprooted as well. | | | | | | |
| EF1 | SE of Louisville | Winston | MS | 33.0885°N 88.9686°W | 01:41–01:47 | 4.26 mi (6.86 km) | 250 yd (230 m) |
| EF1 | This high-end EF1 tornado first impacted the south side of Boon, where a metal gas station building was unroofed and had an exterior wall blown out. A tree fell onto and damaged a nearby home, while another house and a shed sustained roof damage. The tornado then continued to the northeast, snapping multiple trees and damaging another shed before it lifted just after it crossed MS 14. | | | | | | |
| EF2 | N of Brooksville | Noxubee | MS | 33.2445°N 88.5887°W | 02:11–02:16 | 3.42 mi (5.50 km) | 500 yd (460 m) |
| EF2 | A low-end EF2 tornado snapped or uprooted numerous large trees in wooded areas as it crossed US 45. Five power poles were snapped as well, and an irrigation pivot was overturned. | | | | | | |
| EF0 | NW of New Hebron | Lawrence, Simpson | MS | 31.7243°N 90.0773°W | 02:18–02:28 | 5.99 mi (9.64 km) | 75 yd (69 m) |
| EF0 | A few trees were downed, a house had minor roof damage, and a trampoline was thrown. | | | | | | |
| EF1 | NE of New Hebron | Jefferson Davis, Simpson | MS | 31.7385°N 89.9324°W | 02:32–02:38 | 4.02 mi (6.47 km) | 300 yd (270 m) |
| EF1 | This tornado passed through the rural community of Gwinville, where an old gas station building was shifted off its foundation and had its porch uplifted. A house had its porch overhang removed as well, and some trees and tree branches were downed. The tornado dissipated just over the Simpson County line near MS 13. | | | | | | |
| EF1 | NNW of Mize | Smith | MS | 31.9013°N 89.6415°W | 02:52–03:00 | 6.18 mi (9.95 km) | 300 yd (270 m) |
| EF1 | A high-end EF1 tornado damaged or destroyed multiple sheds and outbuildings, one of which had its debris and contents scattered across the ground. A house had minor gutter and exterior damage, and another house had a carport thrown into it. Many trees were snapped or uprooted, and several power poles were also snapped. | | | | | | |
| EF1 | N of Carrollton | Pickens | AL | 33.2937°N 88.1714°W | 02:53–03:02 | 6.94 mi (11.17 km) | 300 yd (270 m) |
| EF1 | Two homes had roofing removed and numerous trees were snapped or uprooted, a few of which fell onto a garage. Power lines were downed and a small power pole was snapped. | | | | | | |

== See also ==
- Tornadoes of 2025
- Weather of 2025
- January 31 – February 2, 2015 North American blizzard
- March 2014 North American winter storm
