= Extreme cold watch =

Weather watch

An extreme cold watch is a weather watch issued by the United States' National Weather Service (NWS) to inform the public that "dangerously cold air, with or without wind, is possible." The extreme cold watch is a 'step' below the "extreme cold warning."

As of 1 October 2024, the NWS replaced the "wind chill watch" with the "extreme cold watch." The NWS officially implemented changes to its wind chill and hard freeze warnings, watches, and advisories (WWAs) as part of its "Hazard Simplification initiative." The goal of these WWA name changes, per the NWS, was "simplifying a suite of cold weather forecast products to improve messaging of winter hazards and provide better decision support." The changes include:

"Extreme cold" WWA consolidation and renaming scheme
_{(WWAs listed from least to most concern to safety)}

- Wind Chill Watch was renamed to Extreme Cold Watch
- Wind Chill Warning was renamed to Extreme Cold Warning
- Wind Chill Advisory was renamed to Cold Weather Advisory

"Freeze" WWA consolidation scheme and renaming scheme
_{(WWAs listed from least to most concern to safety)}

- Hard Freeze Watch was renamed to Freeze Watch
- Hard Freeze Warning was consolidated to Freeze Warning

Note: Local NWS offices determine the standards governing the issuance of such WWAs. For example, one local office may issue an "extreme cold" WWA at a higher- or lower-temperature than other offices.

== Example ==
URGENT - WEATHER MESSAGE
National Weather Service Juneau AK
541 AM AKST Thu Jan 30 2025

AKZ318-310100-
/O.CON.PAJK.EC.A.0001.250201T0300Z-250202T0300Z/
Municipality of Skagway-
Including the cities of Skagway and White Pass
541 AM AKST Thu Jan 30 2025

...EXTREME COLD WATCH REMAINS IN EFFECT FROM FRIDAY EVENING
THROUGH SATURDAY AFTERNOON...

* WHAT...Extremely cold temperatures as low as 40 below possible.
  Wind gusts up to 50 mph are possible.

* WHERE...Skagway and Klondike Highway.
* WHEN...From Friday evening through Saturday afternoon.
* IMPACTS...Frostbite and hypothermia are likely if exposed to
  these temperatures.

* ADDITIONAL DETAILS...Highest wind gusts are expected near the
  city of Skagway with lowest wind chills near White Pass.

PRECAUTIONARY/PREPAREDNESS ACTIONS...

Wear protective clothing such as a hat, facemask and heavy gloves
or mittens if you have plans to be outdoors. To prevent freezing
and possible bursting of outdoor water pipes they should be
wrapped, drained, or allowed to drip slowly. Those that have in-
ground sprinkler systems should drain them and cover above-ground
pipes to protect them from freezing.

&&

$$
