= Extreme cold warning =

Weather warning in the United States and Canada

An extreme cold warning is a weather warning issued by Environment and Climate Change Canada (ECCC) and by the United States' National Weather Service (NWS) to inform the public about active or imminent severe cold temperatures in their local region.

In April 2014, ECCC replaced the "wind chill warning" with an "extreme cold warning." In the older system a wind chill warning for Southern Ontario and Atlantic Canada was issued when the wind chill dropped to -35. Thus a temperature of −37 °C (−35 °F) with no winds would not require a warning be issued. Under the new system the extreme cold warning is issued based on either the temperature or the wind chill being a certain value for at least two hours. The values range from −30 °C (−22 °F) temperatures to −55 °C (−67 °F) in parts of the Arctic.

On October 1, 2024, the NWS replaced the "wind chill warning" with the "extreme cold warning" for the same reasons. The standards governing issuance are set by local NWS offices. The step below an extreme cold warning is an "extreme cold watch," which itself replaced the "wind chill watch" in October 2024.

== Canada ==
An extreme cold warning is issued when the following temperatures are expected to last for at least two hours, which different regions have different criteria for:

- South-Central Ontario and Southwestern Ontario issued at −30 °C (−22 °F)
- Southeastern Ontario, the Southern Interior of British Columbia, the British Columbia Coast and Atlantic Canada (excluding Labrador) issued at −35 °C (−31 °F)
- Quebec (excluding northern Quebec) issued at −38 °C (−36 °F)
- Northern Ontario (excluding the far north), Central Interior of British Columbia and the Prairies (Alberta, southern Manitoba, southern Saskatchewan) issued at −40 °C (−40 °F)
- Far northern Ontario, northern Manitoba (excluding northeastern Manitoba), northern Saskatchewan, Northern Interior of British Columbia and Labrador issued at −45 °C (−49 °F)
- Northern Quebec (excluding Nunavik) issued at −48 °C (−54 °F)
- Yukon, Northwest Territories (excluding Paulatuk, Sachs Harbour, Ulukhaktok), Baffin Island, and northeastern Manitoba issued at −50 °C (−58 °F)
- Nunavik issued at −52 °C (−62 °F)
- Northwest Territories (Paulatuk, Sachs Harbour, Ulukhaktok only) and Nunavut (excluding Baffin Island) issued at −55 °C (−67 °F)

In 2025, ECCC added colour-coded weather alerts to indicate increasing severity of risk, from yellow, to orange, to red. Yellow alerts are used for hazardous weather, orange alerts for severe weather, and red alerts for very dangerous and possibly life-threatening weather.

== United States ==
In the United States an extreme cold warning was an experimental weather warning issued by the National Weather Service in North Dakota, South Dakota, and Minnesota. The warning was issued if the temperature fell to −35 °F (−37 °C) or colder with a wind of less than 5 mph (8 km/h; 2 m/s). It was an experimental advisory for when the air temperature was dangerously cold, but the wind was too little to warrant a Wind Chill Watch or Warning.

The Extreme Cold Warning was used from January 10, 2011, to April 15, 2011. It was discontinued beginning with the 2011-12 winter storm season. Only five Extreme Cold Warnings were issued in that period: one for Burleigh County, three for areas outside of the Bismarck–Mandan metropolitan area, and one for West Glacier, Montana

In a partner webinar on October 30, 2018, the National Weather Service announced that based on survey feedback, the Extreme Cold Warning and the Wind Chill Warning will be consolidated into the Extreme Cold Warning, meaning that this product would once again be issued on a regular basis. This change was hinted to take effect sometime in 2021, accounting for NWS software upgrades. This was confirmed at the AMS 2024 meeting in January 2024.

In October 2024, the NWS officially implemented these changes to its wind chill and hard freeze warnings, watches, and advisories (WWAs) as part of its "Hazard Simplification initiative." The goal of these WWA name changes, per the NWS, is "simplifying a suite of cold weather forecast products to improve messaging of winter hazards and provide better decision support." The changes include:

"Extreme cold" WWA consolidation and renaming scheme
_{(WWAs listed from least to most concern to safety)}

- Wind Chill Watch was renamed to Extreme Cold Watch
- Wind Chill Warning was renamed to Extreme Cold Warning
- Wind Chill Advisory was renamed to Cold Weather Advisory

"Freeze" WWA consolidation scheme and renaming scheme
_{(WWAs listed from least to most concern to safety)}

- Hard Freeze Watch was renamed to Freeze Watch
- Hard Freeze Warning was consolidated to Freeze Warning

Note: Local NWS offices determine the standards governing the issuance of such WWAs. For example, one local office may issue an "extreme cold" WWA at a higher- or lower-temperature than other offices.

== Example of an Extreme Cold Warning (United States) ==
URGENT - WEATHER MESSAGE
National Weather Service Twin Cities/Chanhassen MN
451 PM CST Mon Jan 20 2025

MNZ054-056>060-062-064>070-073>077-082>085-091>093-210700-
/O.UPG.KMPX.CW.Y.0002.000000T0000Z-250121T1800Z/
/O.EXA.KMPX.EC.W.0001.000000T0000Z-250121T1800Z/
Lac Qui Parle-Chippewa-Kandiyohi-Meeker-Wright-Hennepin-Ramsey-
Yellow Medicine-Renville-McLeod-Sibley-Carver-Scott-Dakota-
Redwood-Brown-Nicollet-Le Sueur-Rice-Watonwan-Blue Earth-Waseca-
Steele-Martin-Faribault-Freeborn-
Including the cities of Chanhassen, Waseca, Mankato, Fairmont,
Victoria, Albert Lea, Olivia, St James, Hastings, Owatonna,
Gaylord, Minneapolis, Granite Falls, Willmar, Monticello,
Madison, Litchfield, Hutchinson, Montevideo, Faribault, Chaska,
St Peter, Le Sueur, New Ulm, Redwood Falls, St Paul, Shakopee,
and Blue Earth
451 PM CST Mon Jan 20 2025

...EXTREME COLD WARNING IN EFFECT UNTIL NOON CST TUESDAY...

* WHAT...Dangerously cold wind chills as low as 37 below.
* WHERE...Portions of central, east central, south central,
  southwest, and west central Minnesota.

* WHEN...Until noon CST Tuesday.
* IMPACTS...The dangerously cold wind chills could cause frostbite
  on exposed skin in as little as 10 minutes.

PRECAUTIONARY/PREPAREDNESS ACTIONS...

Persons are urged to stay indoors until conditions improve. If you
must go outside, dress in layers. Several layers of clothes will
keep you warmer than a single heavy coat. Cover exposed skin to
reduce your risk of frostbite or hypothermia. Gloves, a scarf, and a
hat will keep you from losing your body heat.

Keep pets indoors as much as possible.

Make frequent checks on older family, friends, and neighbors. Ensure
portable heaters are used correctly. Do not use generators or grills
inside.

&&

$$

== Example of an Extreme Cold Warning (Canada) ==
3:15 PM CST Monday 3 February 2025
Extreme Cold Warning in effect for:

City of Regina

A multi-day episode of very cold wind chills is expected.

Dangerous wind chill values of minus 40 or colder continue.

Overnight low temperatures approaching minus 30 coupled with winds of 10 to 15 km/h will produce extremely cold wind chill values of minus 40 to minus 45 over the coming days.

Snow moving in from the United States will likely push regions between the international border and the Transcanada Highway above extreme cold thresholds by Tuesday morning. However, areas to the north, in the vicinity of the Yellowhead, will continue with the bitterly cold temperatures into Wednesday morning.

Temperatures are expected to moderate for most by Thursday.

Extreme cold puts everyone at risk.

Risks are greater for young children, older adults, people with chronic illnesses, people working or exercising outdoors, and those without proper shelter.

Watch for cold related symptoms: shortness of breath, chest pain, muscle pain and weakness, numbness and colour change in fingers and toes.

Cover up. Frostbite can develop within minutes on exposed skin, especially with wind chill.

If it’s too cold for you to stay outside, it’s too cold for your pet to stay outside.

Outdoor workers should take regularly scheduled breaks to warm up.

Extreme cold warnings are issued when very cold temperatures or wind chill creates an elevated risk to health such as frost bite and hypothermia.

Please continue to monitor alerts and forecasts issued by Environment Canada. To report severe weather, send an email to SKstorm@ec.gc.ca or tweet reports using #SKStorm.

== See also ==
- Severe weather terminology (United States)
- Extreme heat warning - the polar opposite of an Extreme cold warning
