= Wind chill watch =

Former U.S. weather alert

A wind chill watch was a weather watch formerly issued by the National Weather Service of the United States when the wind chill could reach dangerous levels within the next 12 to 48 hours; as of October 2024 it has been renamed "extreme cold watch." The exact definition required to issue a watch varies from state to state or from National Weather Service county warning areas to another, but if forecasters believe conditions are favorable for life-threatening wind chills meeting local criteria, a watch will be issued. People going outside should plan to protect themselves against hypothermia and frostbite. In October 2024, the "wind chill watch" and "wind chill warning" were, among other changes, renamed in-favor of a "simplified" naming scheme.

== Example ==
The following is an example of a wind chill watch issued by the National Weather Service office in Detroit, Michigan.

017 
WWUS43 KDTX 141646
WSWDTX

URGENT - WINTER WEATHER MESSAGE
NATIONAL WEATHER SERVICE DETROIT/PONTIAC MI
1146 AM EST WED JAN 14 2009

...LONG DURATION ARCTIC VISIT...

.AN ARCTIC AIRMASS WILL BECOME FIRMLY ESTABLISHED OVER THE GREAT
LAKES REGION TONIGHT AND WILL PERSIST THROUGH FRIDAY INTO EARLY
SATURDAY. THE COMBINATION OF BITTERLY COLD AIR...WITH TEMPERATURES
WELL BELOW ZERO AT TIMES...AND A PERSISTENT WIND WILL CREATE
DANGEROUSLY LOW WIND CHILL VALUES. WIND CHILL READINGS WILL DIP TO
AROUND -20 TONIGHT AND THURSDAY. THE HEART OF THE ARCTIC AIRMASS
WILL SETTLE ACROSS THE REGION BEGINNING LATE THURSDAY AND
CONTINUING INTO EARLY SATURDAY. THE ADDITION OF A PERSISTENT WIND
DURING THAT TIME WILL PROPEL WIND CHILL VALUES BELOW -25 DEGREES.

MIZ047>049-053>055-060>063-068>070-075-076-082-083-150100-
/O.NEW.KDTX.WC.Y.0001.090115T0300Z-090116T0000Z/
/O.NEW.KDTX.WC.A.0001.090116T0000Z-090117T1500Z/
MIDLAND-BAY-HURON-SAGINAW-TUSCOLA-SANILAC-SHIAWASSEE-GENESEE-
LAPEER-ST. CLAIR-LIVINGSTON-OAKLAND-MACOMB-WASHTENAW-WAYNE-
LENAWEE-MONROE-
INCLUDING THE CITIES OF...MIDLAND...BAY CITY...BAD AXE...
SAGINAW...CARO...SANDUSKY...OWOSSO...FLINT...LAPEER...
PORT HURON...HOWELL...PONTIAC...WARREN...ANN ARBOR...DETROIT...
ADRIAN...MONROE
1146 AM EST WED JAN 14 2009

...WIND CHILL ADVISORY IN EFFECT FROM 10 PM THIS EVENING TO 7 PM
EST THURSDAY...
...WIND CHILL WATCH IN EFFECT FROM THURSDAY EVENING THROUGH
SATURDAY MORNING...

THE NATIONAL WEATHER SERVICE IN DETROIT/PONTIAC HAS ISSUED A WIND
CHILL ADVISORY...WHICH IS IN EFFECT FROM 10 PM THIS EVENING TO
7 PM EST THURSDAY. A WIND CHILL WATCH HAS ALSO BEEN ISSUED. THIS
WIND CHILL WATCH IS IN EFFECT FROM THURSDAY EVENING THROUGH
SATURDAY MORNING.

THE COMBINATION OF BITTERLY COLD AIR AND A PERSISTENT WIND WILL
CREATE DANGEROUSLY LOW WIND CHILL VALUES. WIND CHILL READINGS WILL
DIP TO AROUND -20 TONIGHT AND THURSDAY. THE HEART OF THE ARCTIC
AIRMASS WILL SETTLE ACROSS THE REGION BEGINNING LATE THURSDAY AND
CONTINUING INTO EARLY SATURDAY. THE ADDITION OF A PERSISTENT WIND
DURING THAT TIME WILL PROPEL WIND CHILL VALUES BELOW -25 DEGREES.

A WIND CHILL ADVISORY MEANS THAT VERY COLD AIR AND STRONG WINDS
WILL COMBINE TO GENERATE LOW WIND CHILLS. THIS WILL RESULT IN
FROST BITE AND LEAD TO HYPOTHERMIA IF PRECAUTIONS ARE NOT TAKEN. 
IF YOU MUST VENTURE OUTDOORS...MAKE SURE YOU WEAR A HAT AND
GLOVES.

A WIND CHILL WATCH MEANS THERE IS THE POTENTIAL FOR A COMBINATION
OF VERY COLD AIR AND STRONG WINDS TO CREATE DANGEROUSLY LOW WIND
CHILL VALUES. MONITOR THE LATEST FORECASTS AND WARNINGS FOR
UPDATES ON THIS SITUATION.

$$

MANN

== October 2024 Update ==
In October 2024, the NWS implemented changes to its wind chill and hard freeze warnings, watches, and advisories (WWAs) as part of its "Hazard Simplification initiative." The goal of these WWA name changes, per the NWS, is "simplifying a suite of cold weather forecast products to improve messaging of winter hazards and provide better decision support." The changes include:

Extreme Cold Consolidation and Renaming

- Wind Chill Watch was renamed to an Extreme Cold Watch
- Wind Chill Warning was renamed to an Extreme Cold Warning
- Wind Chill Advisory was renamed to a Cold Weather Advisory

Freeze Consolidation

- Hard Freeze Watch was consolidated to a Freeze Watch
- Hard Freeze Warning was consolidated to a Freeze Warning

^{Local NWS offices will still determine the standards governing the issuance of such WWAs.}

== See also ==
- Severe weather terminology (United States)
