= EAX =

EAX may refer to:

- EAX mode, a mode of operation for cryptographic block ciphers
- EAX register, a 32-bit processor register of x86 CPUs
- Environmental Audio Extensions, a number of digital signal processing presets for audio, found in Sound Blaster sound cards
- GTD-5 EAX, class 5 digital telephone switch typically used in former GTE service areas
- National Weather Service Kansas City/Pleasant Hill, Missouri, a National Weather Service forecast office (WFO ID EAX)
