= Wind chill warning =

Former American and Canadian weather warning

A wind chill warning was a hazardous weather statement previously issued by both local forecast offices of the National Weather Service (NWS) in the United States and by the Meteorological Service of Environment and Climate Change Canada (ECCC) when wind chills were forecast to reach values low enough for residents and travelers to be susceptible to life-threatening medical conditions (such as severe frostbite and hypothermia) or death associated with accelerated body heat loss. In both Canada and the United States, the "wind chill warning" has been replaced with the "extreme cold warning."

Extreme wind chills meeting wind chill warning criteria can generate a significant decrease in body temperature, and induce frostbite damage to exposed skin and other tissue over an accelerated period of time (onset within as little as 10 to 15 minutes in severe cases). People within the warned area are advised to avoid venturing outdoors unless conducting necessary travel; if going outside, extra precaution should be taken against the likelihood of developing hypothermia and frostbite by wearing multiple layers of clothing (such as a thick winter coat, a scarf and long underwear, in addition to layers of outerwear) as well as a hat (e.g., a knit cap that can be used to cover the ears) and gloves.

In the United States, the exact definition varies from state to state or between National Weather Service county warning areas (with the highest criteria in the Upper Midwest and Alaska, and the lowest criteria in the Florida Peninsula), and a warning is used to express more severe conditions than a wind chill advisory. If extreme wind chills are expected to quickly lead to frostbite or death, then enhanced wording with the words particularly dangerous situation may be added to the text; this is rarely issued. The National Weather Service in Twin Cities/Chanhassen was the first office to do this on January 5, 2014.

On April 8, 2014, Environment Canada replaced the Wind Chill Warning with an Extreme Cold Warning. The warning is still issued based on a region's normal climate. In the older system, a wind chill warning for Southern Ontario and Atlantic Canada was issued when the wind chill dropped to −35 °C (−31 °F). This meant that if the temperature was −37 °C (−35 °F) with no wind a warning was not issued. Under the new system the extreme cold warning is issued based on either the temperature or the wind chill being a certain value for at least two hours. The values range from −30 °C (−22 °F) in the south to −55 °C (−67 °F) in parts of the Arctic.

In the United States, the "wind chill watch" and "wind chill warning" were eliminated in favor of a "simplified" naming scheme, with "wind chill warning" becoming "extreme cold warning."

== Sample Wind Chill Warning ==
The following is an example of a Wind Chill Warning issued by the National Weather Service office in Burlington, Vermont on February 1, 2023.

983 
WWUS41 KBTV 012017
WSWBTV

URGENT - WINTER WEATHER MESSAGE
National Weather Service Burlington VT
317 PM EST Wed Feb 1 2023

NYZ026>031-034-035-087-VTZ001>011-016>021-021000-
/O.UPG.KBTV.WC.A.0001.230203T0600Z-230205T0000Z/
/O.NEW.KBTV.WC.W.0001.230203T0600Z-230204T1800Z/
Northern St. Lawrence-Northern Franklin-Eastern Clinton-
Southeastern St. Lawrence-Southern Franklin-Western Clinton-
Western Essex-Eastern Essex-Southwestern St. Lawrence-Grand Isle-
Western Franklin-Orleans-Essex-Western Chittenden-Lamoille-
Caledonia-Washington-Western Addison-Orange-Western Rutland-
Eastern Franklin-Eastern Chittenden-Eastern Addison-
Eastern Rutland-Western Windsor-Eastern Windsor-
Including the cities of Massena, Norfolk, Fort Covington, Malone,
Champlain, Plattsburgh, South Colton, Star Lake, Saranac Lake, 
Tupper Lake, Dannemora, Ellenburg, Lake Placid, Newcomb, 
Port Henry, Ticonderoga, Ogdensburg, Potsdam, Gouverneur, 
Alburgh, South Hero, St. Albans, Swanton, Derby, Newport, 
Island Pond, Lunenburg, Burlington, Shelburne, Johnson, Stowe, 
Hardwick, St. Johnsbury, Montpelier, Waitsfield, Middlebury, 
Vergennes, Bradford, Randolph, Fair Haven, Rutland, 
Enosburg Falls, Richford, Richmond, Underhill, Bristol, Ripton, 
East Wallingford, Killington, Bethel, Ludlow, Springfield, 
and White River Junction
317 PM EST Wed Feb 1 2023

...WIND CHILL WARNING IN EFFECT FROM 1 AM FRIDAY TO 1 PM EST
SATURDAY...

* WHAT...Dangerously cold wind chills expected. Wind chills as 
  low as 30 to 45 below zero.

* WHERE...All of northern New York and Vermont.

* WHEN...From 1 AM Friday to 1 PM EST Saturday.

* IMPACTS...The dangerously cold wind chills could cause frostbite
  on exposed skin in as little as 10 minutes.

* ADDITIONAL DETAILS...The lowest wind chills will occur Friday 
  into early Saturday morning.

PRECAUTIONARY/PREPAREDNESS ACTIONS...

Have a plan for extreme cold conditions. Prepare your car for cold
weather and ensure your home has sufficient heat. During the
event, cover exposed skin and wear multiple layers of loose- 
fitting, light weight, and warm clothing.


&&

$$

For more information from the National Weather Service visit
http://weather.gov/btv/winter

== Sample PDS Wind Chill Warning ==
The following is an example of a particularly dangerous situation Wind Chill Warning issued by the National Weather Service office in Chanhassen, Minnesota.

WWUS43 KMPX 050957
WSWMPX

URGENT - WINTER WEATHER MESSAGE
NATIONAL WEATHER SERVICE TWIN CITIES/CHANHASSEN MN
357 AM CST SUN JAN 5 2014

...HISTORIC AND LIFE-THREATENING COLD AIR HAS ARRIVED...
...THIS IS A PARTICULARLY DANGEROUS SITUATION...

.THE COLDEST AIRMASS SINCE 1996 CONTINUES TO MOVE SOUTHEAST OUT
OF CANADA AND INTO MINNESOTA AND WISCONSIN. WIND CHILL VALUES WILL
RANGE BETWEEN 30 AND 45 BELOW TODAY AND CONTINUE TO FALL THROUGH
MONDAY MORNING. AIR TEMPERATURES TONIGHT WILL DROP INTO THE 20S
AND 30S BELOW ZERO. GUSTY WEST OR NORTHWEST WINDS COMBINED WITH
THESE EXTREMELY COLD TEMPERATURES WILL PRODUCE WIND CHILLS OF 50 
TO 65 BELOW ZERO LATE TONIGHT AND EARLY MONDAY.

WIND CHILLS COLDER THAN 50 BELOW CAN CAUSE EXPOSED FLESH TO
FREEZE IN ONLY 5 MINUTES. A WIND CHILL WARNING IS IN EFFECT FOR
CENTRAL AND SOUTHERN MINNESOTA AND WEST CENTRAL WISCONSIN THROUGH
NOON TUESDAY.

THE GUSTY WINDS WILL ALSO BRING AREAS OF BLOWING SNOW TO MUCH OF
THE AREA TODAY AND TONIGHT. WHERE GUSTS REACH 35 TO 45 MPH OVER
WESTERN AND SOUTHERN MINNESOTA...VISIBILITIES MAY OCCASIONALLY BE
REDUCED TO LESS THAN A HALF MILE IN NEAR BLIZZARD CONDITIONS. THIS
WILL BRING AN ADDITIONAL LEVEL OF DANGER TO ANYONE STRANDED.

MNZ041-047-048-054>057-064-065-067-073>075-082>085-091>093-052115-
/O.CON.KMPX.WC.W.0001.000000T0000Z-140107T1800Z/
DOUGLAS-STEVENS-POPE-LAC QUI PARLE-SWIFT-CHIPPEWA-KANDIYOHI-
YELLOW MEDICINE-RENVILLE-SIBLEY-REDWOOD-BROWN-NICOLLET-WATONWAN-
BLUE EARTH-WASECA-STEELE-MARTIN-FARIBAULT-FREEBORN-
INCLUDING THE CITIES OF...ALEXANDRIA...MORRIS...GLENWOOD...
MADISON...BENSON...MONTEVIDEO...WILLMAR...GRANITE FALLS...
OLIVIA...GAYLORD...REDWOOD FALLS...NEW ULM...ST. PETER...
ST. JAMES...MANKATO...WASECA...OWATONNA...FAIRMONT...BLUE EARTH...
ALBERT LEA
357 AM CST SUN JAN 5 2014

...WIND CHILL WARNING REMAINS IN EFFECT UNTIL NOON CST TUESDAY...

A WIND CHILL WARNING REMAINS IN EFFECT UNTIL NOON CST TUESDAY. 

* THIS IS A PARTICULARLY DANGEROUS SITUATION!

* WIND CHILL VALUES: 35 TO 65 BELOW...WITH THE COLDEST READINGS
  TONIGHT AND MONDAY MORNING.

* IMPACTS: EXPOSED FLESH WILL FREEZE IN 10 MINUTES WITH WIND
  CHILLS OF 35 BELOW...AND IN 5 MINUTES WITH WIND CHILLS OF 50
  BELOW OR COLDER.

* OTHER IMPACTS...WINDS GUSTING BETWEEN 35 AND 45 MPH THIS
  AFTERNOON AND TONIGHT WILL LEAD TO BLOWING SNOW WITH
  VISIBILITIES OCCASIONALLY DROPPING TO 1/2 MILE OR LESS IN NEAR
  BLIZZARD CONDITIONS. SHOULD YOUR VEHICLE BECOME STRANDED...YOUR
  LIFE WILL BE AT RISK. CONSIDER POSTPONING ALL TRAVEL.

PRECAUTIONARY/PREPAREDNESS ACTIONS...

A WIND CHILL WARNING MEANS THE COMBINATION OF VERY COLD AIR AND
STRONG WINDS WILL CREATE DANGEROUSLY LOW WIND CHILL VALUES. THIS
WILL RESULT IN FROST BITE AND LEAD TO HYPOTHERMIA OR DEATH IF
PRECAUTIONS ARE NOT TAKEN.

&&

$$

MNZ042>045-049>053-058>063-066-068>070-076>078-WIZ014>016-023>028-
052115-
/O.CON.KMPX.WC.W.0001.000000T0000Z-140107T1800Z/
TODD-MORRISON-MILLE LACS-KANABEC-STEARNS-BENTON-SHERBURNE-ISANTI-
CHISAGO-MEEKER-WRIGHT-HENNEPIN-ANOKA-RAMSEY-WASHINGTON-MCLEOD-
CARVER-SCOTT-DAKOTA-LE SUEUR-RICE-GOODHUE-POLK-BARRON-RUSK-
ST. CROIX-PIERCE-DUNN-PEPIN-CHIPPEWA-EAU CLAIRE-
INCLUDING THE CITIES OF...LONG PRAIRIE...LITTLE FALLS...
PRINCETON...MORA...ST. CLOUD...FOLEY...ELK RIVER...CAMBRIDGE...
CENTER CITY...LITCHFIELD...MONTICELLO...MINNEAPOLIS...BLAINE...
ST. PAUL...STILLWATER...HUTCHINSON...CHASKA...SHAKOPEE...
BURNSVILLE...LE SUEUR...FARIBAULT...RED WING...AMERY...
BALSAM LAKE...RICE LAKE...BARRON...LADYSMITH...HUDSON...
NEW RICHMOND...RIVER FALLS...PRESCOTT...MENOMONIE...BOYCEVILLE...
DURAND...PEPIN...CHIPPEWA FALLS...BLOOMER...EAU CLAIRE...ALTOONA
357 AM CST SUN JAN 5 2014

...WIND CHILL WARNING REMAINS IN EFFECT UNTIL NOON CST TUESDAY...

A WIND CHILL WARNING REMAINS IN EFFECT UNTIL NOON CST TUESDAY. 

* THIS IS A PARTICULARLY DANGEROUS SITUATION!

* WIND CHILL VALUES: 35 TO 65 BELOW...WITH THE COLDEST READINGS
  TONIGHT AND MONDAY MORNING.

* IMPACTS: EXPOSED FLESH WILL FREEZE IN 10 MINUTES WITH WIND
  CHILLS OF 35 BELOW...AND IN 5 MINUTES WITH WIND CHILLS OF 50
  BELOW OR COLDER.

* OTHER IMPACTS...AREAS OF BLOWING SNOW ARE POSSIBLE AS WINDS GUST
  AS HIGH AS 35 MPH THIS AFTERNOON AND TONIGHT.

PRECAUTIONARY/PREPAREDNESS ACTIONS...

A WIND CHILL WARNING MEANS THE COMBINATION OF VERY COLD AIR AND
STRONG WINDS WILL CREATE DANGEROUSLY LOW WIND CHILL VALUES. THIS
WILL RESULT IN FROST BITE AND LEAD TO HYPOTHERMIA OR DEATH IF
PRECAUTIONS ARE NOT TAKEN.

&&

$$

BORGHOFF

== October 2024 Update ==
In October 2024, the NWS implemented changes to its wind chill and hard freeze warnings, watches, and advisories (WWAs) as part of its "Hazard Simplification initiative." The goal of these WWA name changes, per the NWS, is "simplifying a suite of cold weather forecast products to improve messaging of winter hazards and provide better decision support." The changes include:

Extreme Cold Consolidation and Renaming

- Wind Chill Watch was renamed to an Extreme Cold Watch
- Wind Chill Warning was renamed to an Extreme Cold Warning
- Wind Chill Advisory was renamed to a Cold Weather Advisory

Freeze Consolidation

- Hard Freeze Watch was consolidated to a Freeze Watch
- Hard Freeze Warning was consolidated to a Freeze Warning

^{Local NWS offices will still determine the standards governing the issuance of such WWAs.}

== See also ==
- Severe weather terminology (United States)
