= Extreme heat watch =

Weather advisory in the United States

An extreme heat watch is a notice issued by the National Weather Service of the United States when the high temperatures reach anywhere within the range of 95 °F (35 °C) and 100 °F (38 °C) in the continental US, as exposure to those temperatures greatly increases the risk of heat stroke and heat exhaustion.

== Example ==
The following is an example of an extreme heat watch issued by the National Weather Service office in Pendleton, Oregon.

743 
WWUS76 KPDT 082026
NPWPDT

URGENT - WEATHER MESSAGE
National Weather Service Pendleton OR
126 PM PDT Fri Aug 8 2025

ORZ041-044-507-WAZ024-026>029-100000-
/O.NEW.KPDT.XH.A.0002.250810T1900Z-250813T0500Z/
Eastern Columbia River Gorge of Oregon-Lower Columbia Basin of
Oregon-Foothills of the Northern Blue Mountains of Oregon-Eastern
Columbia River Gorge of Washington-Kittitas Valley-Yakima Valley-
Lower Columbia Basin of Washington-Foothills of the Blue
Mountains of Washington-
Including the cities of Arlington, Athena, Ellensburg, Hermiston,
Naches, Pilot Rock, White Salmon, Ione, Tri-Cities, Connell,
Sunnyside, Dayton, Walla Walla, Prosser, Boardman, The Dalles,
Pendleton, Toppenish, Waitsburg, Yakima, and Thorp
126 PM PDT Fri Aug 8 2025

...EXTREME HEAT WATCH IN EFFECT FROM SUNDAY AFTERNOON THROUGH 
TUESDAY EVENING...

* WHAT...Dangerously hot conditions with temperatures 99 to 103 
  degrees possible. This will pose a moderate to major risk of 
  heat-related illness.

* WHERE...Eastern Columbia River Gorge of Oregon and Washington, 
  Lower Columbia Basin of Oregon and Washington, Foothills of the 
  Northern Blue Mountains of Oregon, Kittitas Valley, Yakima Valley, 
  and Foothills of the Blue Mountains of Washington.

* WHEN...From Sunday afternoon through Tuesday evening.

* IMPACTS...Heat related illnesses increase significantly during 
  extreme heat events. Extreme heat will significantly increase the 
  risk of heat-related illnesses for much of the population, 
  especially those who are heat sensitive and those without 
  effective cooling or adequate hydration.

PRECAUTIONARY/PREPAREDNESS ACTIONS...

Drink plenty of fluids, stay in an air-conditioned room, stay out of 
the sun, and check up on relatives and neighbors. Young children and 
pets should never be left unattended in vehicles under any 
circumstances.

Monitor the latest forecasts and warnings for updates on this 
situation. Be prepared to drink plenty of fluids, stay in an 
air-conditioned room, stay out of the sun, and check up on relatives 
and neighbors.



&&

$$

== See also ==
- Extreme heat warning
- Severe weather terminology (United States)
