= National Weather Service Topeka, Kansas =

Weather forecast office serving northeast Kansas

National Weather Service Weather Forecast Office Topeka, Kansas

- The 23 counties in northeastern Kansas served by the Topeka NWS Forecast Office

Agency overview
- Type: Meteorological
- Jurisdiction: Federal Government of the United States
- Headquarters: 1116 NE Strait Avenue, Topeka, Kansas 66616-1667; 39.072399°N 95.631106°W
- Employees: 21
- Agency executives: Kris Craven, Meteorologist in Charge; Chad Omitt, Warning Coordination Meteorologist
- Parent agency: National Weather Service
- Website: www.weather.gov/top/

National Weather Service – Topeka, Kansas (Abbreviation TOP) is a local National Weather Service forecast office based in Topeka, the state capital of Kansas. Its offices are located near Philip Billard Municipal Airport. It provides weather and emergency information to 23 counties in north-central, northeast, and east-central Kansas. Communities that rely on the Topeka Weather Office for forecasts and severe storm warnings include Abilene, Clay Center, Concordia, Council Grove, Emporia, Hiawatha, Junction City, Lawrence, Manhattan, Marysville, Ottawa, and Topeka.

== NOAA Weather Radio ==
The Topeka NWS Office operates five NOAA Weather Radio transmitters to provide timely weather forecasts, watches, warnings and statements to the public. All transmitters operate on 1000 watts of power.

=== WXK91, Maple Hill/Topeka ===
WXK91, based in Maple Hill, broadcasts at 162.475 MHz and serves the following Kansas counties: Douglas, Geary, Jackson, Jefferson, Morris, Osage, Pottawatomie, Riley, Shawnee, Wabaunsee, and Atchison§.

§ Atchison County falls under the responsibility of the Pleasant Hill, MO Forecast Office.

=== WXK94, Concordia ===
WXK94, based in Concordia, broadcasts at 162.550 MHz and serves the following Kansas counties: Clay, Cloud, Ottawa, Republic, Washington, Jewell§, and Mitchell§.

§ Jewell and Mitchell counties fall under the responsibility of the Hastings, NE Forecast Office.

=== WXL71, Abilene ===
WXL71, based in Abilene, broadcasts at 162.525 MHz and serves the following Kansas counties: Clay, Dickinson, Geary, Morris, Ottawa, Riley, Marion§, McPherson§, and Saline§.

§ Marion, McPherson and Saline counties fall under the responsibility of the Wichita, KS Forecast Office.

=== KZZ67, Blue Rapids ===
KZZ67, based in Blue Rapids, broadcasts at 162.425 MHz and serves the following Kansas counties: Marshall, Nemaha, Pottawatomie, Riley, and Washington.

=== KGG98, Halls Summit ===
KGG98, based in Halls Summit, broadcasts at 162.425 MHz and serves the following Kansas counties: Anderson, Coffey, Douglas, Franklin, Lyon, Osage, Allen§, Chase§, Greenwood§, and Woodson§.

§ Allen, Chase, Greenwood and Woodson counties fall under the responsibility of the Wichita, KS Forecast Office.
