= Harriet Jane Lawrence =

- Born: September 13, 1883; Kingsbury, Maine, U.S.
- Died: February 28, 1974 (aged 90); Portland, Oregon, U.S.
- Education: Boston University School of Medicine
- Occupations: Pathologist; physician
- Years active: 1912-1967
- Known for: Work during the 1918 influenza pandemic; first known woman pathologist in Oregon
- Awards: Distinguished Alumni Award (Boston University, 1963)

Harriet Jane Lawrence (September 13, 1883 – February 28, 1974) was an American physician and pathologist who was among the early women to specialize in laboratory medicine in the United States and the first known woman pathologist in Oregon. She earned her medical degree from Boston University School of Medicine in 1912 and established a clinical laboratory in Portland the following year, directing it for more than fifty years.

During the 1918 influenza pandemic, Lawrence isolated hemolytic streptococcus from infected patients and developed a bacterial vaccine intended to combat secondary pneumonia associated with influenza. Although the viral cause of influenza was not yet understood, her work contributed to statewide treatment efforts and brought her national recognition. Over the course of her career, she supported the early medical career of Alan L. Hart and advocated for expanded opportunities for women in medicine.

== Early life and education ==
Harriet Jane Lawrence was born on September 13, 1883, in Kingsbury, Maine. She began working as a teacher at the age of fifteen and used her earnings to help finance her continued education. Through savings from her teaching work, she was able to pursue higher education and eventually enroll in medical school.

Lawrence attended Boston University School of Medicine, where she earned her medical degree in 1912. She was one of six women in her graduating class at a time when women remained significantly underrepresented in medical education. She later received the 1963 Distinguished Alumni Award from Boston University in acknowledgment of her contributions to medicine and work to advance women in the field.

== Career and research ==
=== Early work ===
After completing her medical training in 1912, Lawrence briefly worked as a resident pathologist in Boston. That same year, she relocated to Portland, Oregon where she worked with tuberculosis specialist Ralph Matson. Lawrence established her own clinical laboratory in the Selling Building in 1913. She directed the laboratory for more than fifty years, providing diagnostic services to physicians and public agencies throughout Oregon. Lawrence conducted experimental work related to infectious disease and kept laboratory animals, including guinea pigs, at her home on Southeast Peacock Lane for research purposes.

=== Support of Alan L. Hart ===
Lawrence played a supportive role in the early career of physician and radiologist Alan L. Hart. Following Hart’s transition in 1917, she provided professional advocacy and a written recommendation that helped him secure a medical appointment at the Albuquerque Sanatorium.

=== 1918 influenza pandemic ===
The influenza pandemic of 1918 placed a sever strain on Oregon’s hospitals and public health infrastructure. At the time, the viral cause of influenza had not yet been identified, and many physicians believed that the high mortality rate resulted from secondary bacterial infections. In response, the Oregon State Board of Health supplied Lawrence’s laboratory with an infected tissue sample obtained from a navy yard in Bremerton, Washington.

Lawrence isolated hemolytic streptococcus from patient samples and developed a vaccine targeting this bacterium, which was associated with secondary pneumonia in influenza patients. Although described at the time as an influenza vaccine, the preparation was designed to combat bacterial infections that frequently followed influenza rather than the virus itself. The vaccines produced in her laboratory were distributed to physicians throughout Oregon as part of broader public health efforts.

Her work received national recognition, and she was later honored by President Woodrow Wilson for her contributions.

=== Later research and leadership ===
Lawrence continued to direct her laboratory for more than fifty years, and it developed a reputation for reliability among investigators. She worked closely with the Board of Medical Examiners in Portland.

Beyond her laboratory work, Lawrence was active in professional and civic organizations. Lawrence became a fellow with the newly formed American Society of Clinical Pathologists in 1927. The goal of the organization was to advance the field of clinical pathology and to ensure it was on equal ground with other specialized areas of medicine. She was a member of the Medical Club of Portland where she worked with other notable women physicians such as Mae Cardwell, Jessie Fern McGavin, and Amelia Zeigler. Lawrence also supported the local chapter of the Philanthropic Educational Organization (P.E.O.) Sisterhood, which was an international organization that worked to provide educational opportunities for women. Through these affiliations she encouraged women to enter medicine and advocated for equal educational opportunities.

In 1963, Boston University’s General Alumni Association awarded her its Distinguished Alumni Award. She retired in 1967.

== Personal life ==
Federal census records from the 1920s through the 1940s indicate that she lived in Portland and had a daughter named Elizabeth. She died in Portland on February 28, 1974.
