= Halls Summit, Kansas =

Unincorporated community in Coffey County, Kansas

Coordinates: 38°20′50″N 95°40′31″W

Halls Summit is an unincorporated community in Coffey County, Kansas, United States. It is located at the intersection of 22nd Rd NW and Planter Rd.

== History ==
Halls Summit had a post office from 1878 until 1935. Since 2003, it has been the home of NOAA Weather Radio transmitter, KGG-98, operated by the National Weather Service Topeka, Kansas to serve residents of east-central and southeast Kansas.

== Education ==
The community is served by Lebo–Waverly USD 243 public school district.

== Notable people ==
- Alan L. Hart (1890–1962), physician and tuberculosis researcher, born in Halls Summit
