= Alan L. Hart =

Transgender American physician and writer (1890–1962)

- Alan L. Hart in 1943
- Born: October 4, 1890; Halls Summit, Kansas, US
- Died: July 1, 1962 (aged 71)
- Education: Albany College; Stanford University; University of Oregon; Stanford University School of Medicine
- Occupations: Physician; radiologist; tuberculosis researcher; writer; novelist
- Writing career
- Pen name: Robert Allen Bamford Jr. A. L. H. A. Hart
- Language: English
- Notable works: Doctor Mallory; These Mysterious Rays

Alan L. Hart (also known as Robert Allen Bamford Jr., October 4, 1890 – July 1, 1962) was an American physician, radiologist, tuberculosis researcher, writer, and novelist. Hart pioneered the use of X-ray photography in tuberculosis detection; he worked in sanitariums and X-ray clinics in New Mexico, Illinois, Washington, and Idaho. For the last 16 years of his life, he headed mass X-ray programs that screened for tuberculosis in Connecticut. X-rays were not regularly used to screen for tuberculosis prior to Hart's innovation, and are still used today, which has led researchers to believe that he saved countless lives.

As a fiction author, Hart published over nine short stories and four novels, which incorporated drama, romance, and medical themes.

Circa 1917, Hart became one of the first trans men in the United States to undergo a hysterectomy.

== Early life ==
Hart pictured in the early 1890s

Hart was born on October 4, 1890, in Halls Summit, Coffey County, Kansas, to Albert L. Hart and Edna Hart (née Bamford). When his father died of typhoid fever in 1892, his mother reverted to her maiden name and moved the family to Linn County, Oregon. When Hart was five years old his mother remarried, to Bill Barton, and the family moved to Edna's father's farm. Hart wrote later, in 1911, of his happiness during this time, when he was free to present as male, playing with boys' toys made for him by his grandfather. His parents and grandparents largely accepted and supported his gender expression, though his mother described his "desire to be a boy" as "foolish". His grandparents' obituaries, from 1921 and 1924, both list Hart as a grandson. When Hart was 12 the family moved to Albany. There Hart was obliged to present as female to attend school, where he was treated as a girl. He continued to spend the holidays at his grandfather's farm, presenting as male among his male friends, "teasing the girls and playing boy's games".

During his school years, Hart was allowed to write essays under his chosen name "Robert Allen Bamford Jr." with little resistance from his classmates or teachers. It was common at the time for writers to use pseudonyms, including to assume names of a different gender. Hart published work in local newspapers and in school and college publications under this name, or as "submitted by an anonymous boy", or using the neutral "A. L. H." or "A. Hart". He used his legal name only under pressure from peers or seniors. His early work dealt with masculine subjects, even when he was asked to write on topics about life as a woman. When asked to write about female classmates or friends he portrayed them as prize fighters or boyish basketball players.

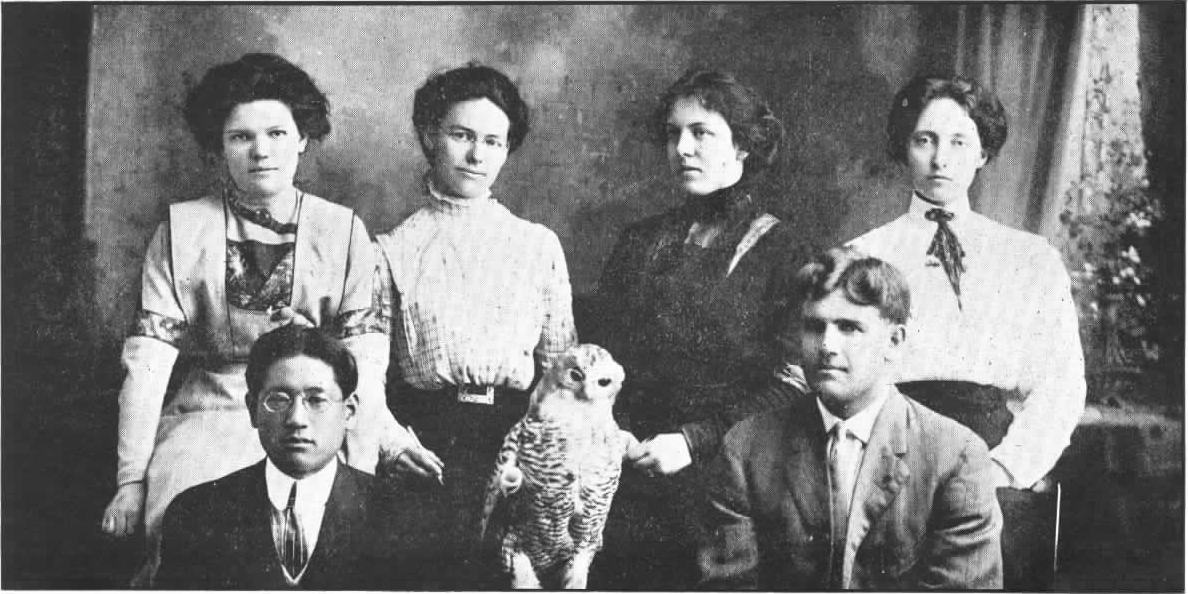
Hart (standing on right) as a part of editorial staff for college yearbook

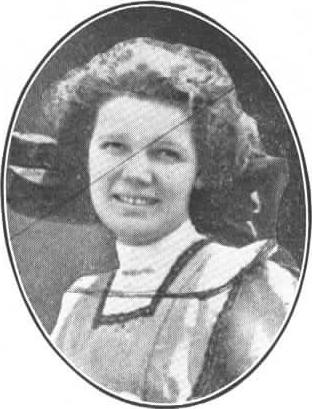
Eva Cushman, who dated Hart during his college years

Hart attended Albany College (now Lewis & Clark College), then transferred with classmate and romantic partner Eva Cushman to Stanford University for the 1911–1912 school year before going back to Albany. Hart graduated from Albany College in 1912, and in 1917 obtained a Doctor of Medicine degree from the University of Oregon Medical Department in Portland (now Oregon Health & Science University); during this period, Hart also returned to Northern California to attend courses in the summer of 1916 at the Stanford University School of Medicine, then located in San Francisco. Hart was deeply unhappy that the medical degree was issued in his female name, limiting his opportunities to use it in any future life under a male name. College records show that at least one of the senior staff was sympathetic; his graduation records were indexed internally as "Hart, Lucille (aka Robert L.), M.D." Nonetheless, Hart knew that if he presented himself as Robert, any prospective employer checking his credentials would discover the female name or find no records for him at all. After graduation he worked for a short while (presenting as a woman) at a Red Cross hospital in Philadelphia.

== Tuberculosis research ==
Hart devoted much of his career to research into and treatment of tuberculosis. In the early 20th century the disease was the biggest killer in America. Doctors, including Hart, were realizing that myriad illnesses (consumption, phthisis, phthisis pulmonalis, Koch's disease, scrofula, lupus vulgaris, white plague, King's evil, Pott's disease and Gibbus) were all cases of tuberculosis (TB). TB usually attacked victims' lungs first; Hart was among the first physicians to document how it then spread, via the circulatory system, causing lesions on the kidneys, spine, and brain, eventually resulting in death. Scientists had discovered in the nineteenth century that tuberculosis was not hereditary, but an airborne bacillus spread rapidly among persons in close proximity by coughing and sneezing. This meant it might be treated, but with no cure for the disease in its advanced stages the only hope for sufferers was early detection.

X-rays, or Roentgen rays as they were more commonly known until World War Two, had been discovered only in 1895, when Hart was five years old. In the early twentieth century they were used to detect bone fractures and tumors, but Hart became interested in their potential for detecting tuberculosis. Since the disease often presented no symptoms in its early stages, X-ray screening was invaluable for early detection. Even rudimentary early X-ray machines could detect the disease before it became critical. This allowed early treatment, often saving the patient's life. It also meant sufferers could be identified and isolated from the population, greatly lessening the spread of the disease. Hart established numerous mass X-ray clinics to identify non-symptomatic TB cases in cities across the country. Public fund-raising drives, like the newly created Christmas Seal campaign, helped finance these efforts. By the time antibiotics were introduced in the 1940s, doctors using the techniques Hart developed had managed to cut the tuberculosis death toll down to one fiftieth of what it had previously been.

In 1937, Hart was hired by the Idaho Tuberculosis Association and later became the state's Tuberculosis Control Officer. He established Idaho's first fixed-location and mobile TB screening clinics and spearheaded the state's war against tuberculosis. Between 1933 and 1945 Hart traveled extensively through rural Idaho, covering thousands of miles while lecturing, conducting mass TB screenings, training new staff, and treating the effects of the epidemic.

An experienced and accessible writer, Hart wrote widely for medical journals and popular publications, describing TB for technical and general audiences and giving advice on its prevention, detection, and cure. At the time the word "tuberculosis" carried a social stigma akin to venereal disease, so Hart insisted his clinics be referred to as "chest clinics", himself as a "chest doctor", and his patients as "chest patients". Discretion and compassion were important tools in treating the stigmatized disease.

In 1943, Hart, now recognized as pre-eminent in the field of tubercular roentgenology, compiled his extensive evidence on TB and other X-ray-detectable cases into a definitive compendium, These Mysterious Rays: A Nontechnical Discussion of the Uses of X-rays and Radium, Chiefly in Medicine (published by Harper & Brothers), still a standard text today. It was the first general audience book on this subject, which allowed patients to understand how X-rays were a helpful diagnostic tool in a wide variety of cases. In the book, Hart also worked to dispel widespread safety concerns about X-ray technology, an artifact of the volatility of first-generation X-ray machines. These Mysterious Rays was translated into Spanish and several other languages.

In 1948, Hart was appointed director of hospitalization and rehabilitation for the Connecticut State Tuberculosis Commission. As in Idaho, Hart took charge of a massive statewide X-ray screening program for TB, emphasizing the importance of early detection and treatment. He lived out his life holding this position, and is credited with helping contain the spread of tuberculosis in Connecticut as he had previously in the Pacific Northwest. Similar programs based on his leadership and methodology in this field in other states also saved many thousands of lives.

== Personal life ==
=== Transition ===
Upon reaching adulthood, Hart sought psychiatric counselling and surgery to continue passing as a man. Hart's was the first documented transgender male transition in the United States, though sex reassignment surgeries had been carried out earlier in Germany, including on one man, treated by German sexologist Magnus Hirschfeld, who had won the right to serve in the German military. The 1906–1907 case of Karl M. Baer had set a new precedent for sex reassignment surgery by enlisting simultaneous support from psychiatric, legal, and surgical quarters. There was now medical and legal precedent for transitioning; Hart's approach to his own transition appears to have drawn on the Baer case.

In 1917, Hart approached Joshua Allen Gilbert, at the University of Oregon and requested surgery to eliminate menstruation and the possibility of ever becoming pregnant. He also presented Gilbert with a eugenic argument, that a person with "abnormal inversion" should be sterilized. Gilbert was initially reluctant, but accepted that Hart was "extremely intelligent and not mentally ill, but afflicted with a mysterious disorder for which I [Gilbert] have no explanation". He accepted that Hart experienced himself only as a male, who described himself using phrases including "the other fellows and I" and asking "what could a fellow do?" Gilbert wrote, in case notes published in the Journal of Nervous and Mental Disease in 1920, that "from a sociological and psychological standpoint [Hart] is a man" and that living as one was Hart's only chance for a happy existence, "the best that can be done". Gilbert addressed the fact that Hart already passed as male, stating: "Many Kodak pictures of H have been exhibited as those of a man without being questioned." He added: "Let him who finds in himself a tendency to criticize to offer some constructive method of dealing with the problem on hand. He will not want for difficulties. The patient and I have done our best with it."

Early female to male (FTM) reassignment surgeries involved the implanting of testicular tissue in place of the removed ovaries. Crystalline male hormones had been extracted in usable quantities from male urine by 1903, but it represented an infection risk.

Hart's surgery was completed at the University of Oregon Medical School over the 1917–1918 winter vacation. He then legally changed his name.

He interned at San Francisco Hospital. A former classmate recognized him there, and he was outed as transgender in the Spokesman-Review newspaper on February 6, 1918. The article's opening sentence referred to him by his birth name and with she/her pronouns, describing him as having graduated from Stanford "as a fluffy coed ... [who] affected boyish mannerisms".

In February 1918, he married his first wife, Inez Stark, at a Congregational church and moved with her to Gardiner, Oregon, to set up his own medical practice.

In an interview with a local paper, Hart declared that he was "happier since I made this change than I ever have in my life, and I will continue this way as long as I live .... I have never concealed anything regarding my [change] to men's clothing .... I came home to show my friends that I am ashamed of nothing".

Synthetic hormones were not immediately available. When given the opportunity, Hart began taking testosterone. His treatment led to masculinization, including a lower-pitched voice and facial hair.

=== Life after transition ===
In Oregon, Hart suffered an early blow when a former medical school classmate outed him as transgender, forcing Hart and his wife to move. Hart found the experience traumatic and again consulted Gilbert, who wrote that Hart had suffered from "the hounding process ... which our modern social organization can carry on to such perfection and refinement". Hart set up a new practice in remote Huntley, Montana, writing later that he "did operations in barns and houses ... [till] the crash of the autumn of 1920 wiped out most of the Montana farmers and stockmen, and me along with them". He then took itinerant work, until in 1921, on a written recommendation from noted physician Harriet J. Lawrence (decorated by President Wilson for developing a flu vaccine (Note: Actually a vaccine for hemolytic streptococcus, a secondary bacterial infection commonly occurring in patients infected with Spanish flu.)), he secured a post as staff physician at Albuquerque Sanatorium.

The relocations, financial insecurity, and secrecy placed strain on Hart's marriage, and Inez left him in September 1923. She ordered him to have no further contact with her, and divorced him in 1925. The same year Hart married his second wife, Edna Ruddick; the union lasted until the end of Hart's life. In 1925 Hart moved to the Trudeau School of Tuberculosis in New York, where he also carried out postgraduate work; he spent 1926–1928 as a clinician at the Rockford TB sanatorium in Illinois. In 1928 Hart obtained a master's degree in Radiology from the University of Pennsylvania; he was in 1929 appointed Director of Radiology at Tacoma General Hospital. During the 1930s the couple moved to Idaho, where Hart worked during the 1930s and early 1940s; his work also took him to Washington, where he held a research fellowship as a roentgenologist in Spokane. During the war Hart was also a medical adviser at the Army Recruiting and Induction headquarters in Seattle, while Edna worked for the King County Welfare Department in the same city.

In 1948, after Hart obtained a master's degree in public health from Yale, the couple moved to Connecticut, where Hart had been appointed Director of Hospitalization and Rehabilitation for the Connecticut State Tuberculosis Commission. The couple lived out their lives in West Hartford, Connecticut, where Edna became a professor at the University of Hartford. After the Second World War synthetic testosterone became available in the US, and for the first time Hart was able to grow a beard and shave. He also developed a deeper voice, making him more confident and his public appearances easier.

During the last six years of his life Hart gave numerous lectures, and dedicated all his free time to fundraising for medical research and to support patients with advanced TB who could not afford treatment. He was a member of the American Thoracic Society, American Public Health Association, American Association for the Advancement of Science, and American Civil Liberties Union, among many others. Socially, both he and Edna were well liked, active community leaders. Alan was of Protestant faith and served for eight years as vice president for his local Unitarian Church council.

Hart died of heart failure on July 1, 1962. The terms of his will directed his body be cremated and his ashes scattered over Puget Sound where he and Edna had spent many happy summers together.

Hart said once, in a speech to graduating medical students, "Each of us must take into account the raw material which heredity dealt us at birth and the opportunities we have had along the way, and then work out for ourselves a sensible evaluation of our personalities and accomplishments".

== Bibliography ==
Alongside his medical practice and research, Hart pursued a second career as a novelist. He had in early life published in local, school, and college magazines, and later published four novels, chiefly on medical themes. His four novels incorporate semi-autobiographical themes: The Undaunted (1936) contains a doctor, Richard Cameron, who describes himself as a 'cripple' after his foot is amputated following persistent bone infection. Cameron worries that this physical defect will drive women away, but ends up marrying his sweetheart. A second character, a radiologist named Sandy Farquhar, is a gay man who has been harassed and tormented, driven from job to job, over his sexuality. Farquhar, who is short, thin, and bespectacled, resembles Hart physically, and considers himself "the possessor of a defective body". Another novel, In the Lives of Men, contains a gay male character with a missing arm.

=== Early short stories ===
These short stories were collected in The Life and Career of Alberta Lucille/Dr. Alan L. Hart, with collected early writings, by Brian Booth.

- 1908: "Frankfort Center" (published in the Albany High School Whirlwind) – For an assignment to write about female college members and sporting activities, Hart described the ambiguously named "Frances", a prize boxer and basketball player.
- 1909: "My Irish Colleen" (published anonymously in the Albany College Student, March 1909 issue) – A love poem, presented as the work of an anonymous male student about an Irish girl. It was reprinted in his college yearbook in 1911, under his female name, outing his crush on Eva Cushman.
- 1909: "To the Faculty" (published in the Albany College Student, March 1909 issue) – A call for student rebellion and a statement of the need of students to be taken seriously. The work discusses doves spreading their wings and flying, reflecting Hart's sense of confinement while forced to live as a sedate young woman.
- 1909: "The American 'Martha'" (published in the Albany College Student, December 1909 issue) – A critical take on the fate of women obliged to be housewives, and raising their daughters to the same destiny. The piece quoted the Bible and reflected a concern for women's rights.
- 1909: "'Ma' on the Football Hero" (published in the Albany College Student, December 1909 issue) – Hart asks "what would his mother would say if he were to be a rough and tough College football hero?"
- 1910: "The Magic of Someday" (published in the Albany College Student, January 1910 issue) – A lament on the destruction of Hart's childhood dreams of freedom when he was obliged to be female; ending with hope for a future in which he, "with a heart of a man", might be happy.
- 1910: "The National Triune" (published in the Albany College Student, February 1910 issue, under the pseudonym "Lucille Hart") – the story condemns contemporary politic scandals and the injustice of sexism, and sets out Hart's ideas about the character of a true and respectable man.
- 1910: "The Unwritten Law of the Campus" (published in the Albany College Student, March 1910 issue) – A discussion of the difference between moral laws, physical laws, and laws of convention, with reference to discourtesy of someone who tells tales on another student for contravening gender norms.
- 1911: "An Idyll of a Country Childhood" (published in The Takenah, Albany College yearbook, 1911) – By now Hart's habits of male dress outside school were well-known, and this story frankly described his early life and its freedom to dress and live as a boy.

=== Novels ===
- 1935: Doctor Mallory (published by W. W. Norton & Company) – An overnight best-seller, Hart's first novel drew on his experiences as a small-town doctor in Gardiner, Oregon. It portrayed the medical profession as increasingly venal, and was the first exposé of the medical world by a working doctor.
- 1936: The Undaunted (published by W. W. Norton & Company) – This novel showed gay physician "Sandy Farquhar" pursuing a career in radiology "because he thought it wouldn't matter so much in a laboratory what a man's personality was", conflicts and themes which Hart himself had experienced in his early career.
- 1937: In the Lives of Men (published by W. W. Norton & Company) – Hart's third novel was favorably reviewed for its insights into contemporary medicine, but the reviewer at a national magazine (The Saturday Review of Literature) noted "as a doctor, Hart knows surprisingly little about women".
- 1942: Doctor Finlay Sees it Through (published by Harper & Brothers) – Hart's final novel, not to be confused with A. J. Cronin's Dr. Finlay's Casebook, is considered to have influenced subsequent medical fiction. Another semi-autobiographical account, it revolves around John Finlay, a relatively wealthy doctor who owns his own practice during the Great Depression.

== Legacy ==
After Hart's death, his wife acted on his wish to establish a fund for research into leukemia, from which his mother had died. The interest on his estate is donated annually to the Alan L. and Edna Ruddick Hart Fund, which makes grants for research into leukemia and its cure.

Hart's will, written in 1943, stipulated that his personal letters and photographs be destroyed, and this was done on his death in 1962. Hart had acted all his life to control the interpretation of his private and emotional life, and the destruction of his personal records at his death were commensurate with this goal. Believing that the secret of his personal history was safe he made no attempt to account for his own life. His identity as the pseudonymous "H" in Gilbert's notes was discovered posthumously by Jonathan Ned Katz, and his identity described as lesbian. Katz's attempts to learn more about Hart's life by contacting Hart's widow were discouraged by Edna Ruddick Hart. The message passed on by her friend in Albany was: "Let that all be passed now. She is older and does not want any more heart ache now."

== Controversy ==
=== Lesbian reclamation ===
Jonathan Ned Katz, who in Gay American History: Lesbians and Gay Men in the U.S.A. (1976) first identified Hart as the pseudonymous "H" in Joseph Gilbert's 1920s case notes, described Hart as a lesbian and depicted his case as one where contemporary strictures against lesbianism were so strong that a 'woman' like Hart had to adopt a male identity to pursue love affairs with women. Katz contended again in his 1983 Gay/Lesbian Almanac: A New Documentary that Hart was "clearly a lesbian, a woman-loving woman".

As activist Margaret Deidre O'Hartigan noted in the book The Phallus Palace, Katz expressed the belief that transsexualism was "quack medicine" at the time. Wrote Katz: "An historical study needs to be made of the medical and autobiographical literature on 'transsexualism'; it will, I think, reveal the fundamentally sexist nature of the concept and the associated medical treatments." Hart's widow refused interviews with Katz as she was offended by his categorization of her husband (and by extension, herself) as lesbian. Katz has said he would not portray Hart as a lesbian today.

In 1981, the Oregon gay and lesbian rights PAC called Right to Privacy began hosting the Lucille Hart dinner. They characterized Alan Hart as a famous lesbian from Portland. This fundraiser regularly collected over $100,000 in contributions annually. Right to Privacy's executive director, Barry Pack, said in 1995: "We continue to believe that Lucille Hart made a choice to represent herself as a man based on the oppression of society at large ... It is our belief that by honoring the beginning of her life as a woman, as well as the end of her life as a man, we bring greater dignity and respect to one of Oregon's greatest lesbian and gay heroes." In 1996, The Oregonian reported that Right to Privacy said Hart obtaining a hysterectomy was an "unfortunate result of the psychotherapy".

Right to Privacy published "The Lucille Hart Story: an Unconventional Fairy Tale" in 1996. It was authored by amateur historian Tom Cook, and Thomas Lauderdale, who had a degree in history but a career as a pianist for the band Pink Martini. Both Cook and Lauderdale believed that Hart was a lesbian and frequently gave soundbites to newspapers about it as well as formal presentations at colleges and history museums in Oregon and Washington.

Other Portland publications, such as Alternative Connections in 1993 and Just Out in 1995, also claimed Hart was a lesbian. In 1995, transsexual historian Susan Stryker weighed in on Hart's identity twice in the Transsexual News Telegraph. Stryker claimed in the summer of 1995 that Hart was "the butch half of a butch/femme relationship". In the following issue, Stryker said that her social constructionist views of identity gave her "reservations about using the word 'transsexual' to refer to people before the mid 20th century who identify in a profound, ongoing manner with a gender that they were not assigned at birth". The term 'transsexual' was not published until the 1920s, and not widely used until the 1960s, near Hart's death. O'Hartigan noted in The Phallus Palace that a social constructionist view would seem to exclude claiming Hart was butch as well.

=== Transgender protest of lesbian reclamation ===
In the popular 1985 pamphlet, Information for the Female-to-Male Crossdresser and Transsexual, author and activist Lou Sullivan listed Alan Hart as a historical figure representing transgender men. In October 1994, Candice Hellen Brown, a male-to-female transsexual residing in Portland, wrote a letter to the editor of Just Out magazine defending Hart's manhood and criticizing the Right to Privacy dinner. In her letter, she wrote:

The Right to Privacy Political Action Committee in Oregon has a big fundraiser every year that is called the Lucille Hart Dinner. When asked if I am going, I indignantly answer, "Not until they stop using the wrong name and gender for one of our heroes!" His name is Alan ... He never wavered from his identity as a man, and upon his death, his widow continued to insist that he was a man. Why would such a straight man be called a lesbian by the gay community when today we would certainly call him a female-to-male transsexual? ... He was transsexual or, at least, a transgenderist – a true pioneer. One who is seen as a hero by today's transsexual community. Please don't let him be taken away from us by allowing his old name to be used as though it were a badge of honor.

Margaret Deidre O'Hartigan called this "the opening shot in the struggle to restore Hart's manhood" in The Phallus Palace. In 1995, Candice Hellen Brown and other transsexuals in Portland formed the Ad Hoc Committee of Transsexuals to Recognize Alan Hart. A representative from the committee, Rachel Koteles, approached the Portland chapter of the Lesbian Avengers and asked if they would like to see a presentation that argued their case. The Lesbian Avengers agreed and, upon seeing a presentation by Brown, Koteles, and a female-to-male transsexual named Ken Morris, were persuaded to believe that Alan Hart was a transgender man. After attempting to negotiate with the Right to Privacy commission, The Lesbian Avengers and the Ad Hoc Committee of Transsexuals decided to protest the Lucille Hart Dinner and other events.

In October 1995, members from the Ad Hoc Committee interrupted a Reed College lecture given by Thomas Cook titled "The Legendary Life of Lucille Hart, alias Dr. Alan Hart" to unfurl a 20-foot banner that said "HIS NAME WAS ALAN!" Three days after this protest, over a dozen transsexuals and lesbians (including Brown, Morris, Koteles, several members of the Portland Lesbian Avengers, several transsexual men from Seattle, and the wife of one of those men) protested the Right to Privacy dinner in the convention center where it was taking place. They wore buttons that said "HIS NAME WAS ALAN HART!" and passed out over 400 yellow flyers to attendees that said "HIS NAME WAS ALAN" and explained that they wanted the Right to Privacy dinner to acknowledge that he was a "transsexual hero". The Lesbian Avengers also placed a message on the flyer urging Right to Privacy to acknowledge Hart this way. According to FTM International, attendees responded to this with generally favorable attitudes.

After the protest, Brown wrote an editorial for Just Out that emphasized the Ad Hoc Committee was not complaining about lesbian and gay people in general. Brown emphasized that the Committee believed that the lesbians and gays who were transphobic were a "minority of the gay and lesbian community". She emphasized the allyship of the Lesbian Avengers in this editorial. Right to Privacy was resistant to the protests, with their chair, Lisa Maxfield, saying that she was "not yet convinced" that anyone could know "the truth about whether Lucy was a lesbian or preoperative transsexual". However, Right to Privacy agreed to start a face-to-face dialogue about the issue with the Ad Hoc Committee in January 1996.

=== Transgender reclamation and conflict resolution ===
2026 sticker of notable trans man Dr. Alan Hart on a lamp post in Boise, Idaho touting his TB research

In March 1996, the board of Right to Privacy announced that they would change the name of the Lucille Hart Dinner. According to Maxfield: "The articles presented to us were very convincing and certainly influenced our decision." Right to Privacy settled on the name "Right to Pride" for the next dinner that same year. In 1999, Right to Pride dissolved, and many members joined Basic Rights Oregon, a similar gay and lesbian group. They used Hart's name for fundraising in 2000 for the "17th Annual Hart Dinner" and used both she and he pronouns for him in the pamphlet. In 2003, the writer Joy Parks described the battle, especially within Portland, Oregon LGBT communities over Hart's identity as "extremely ugly" and one in which "neither side appeared particularly victorious".

In 1997, female-to-male transsexual philosopher Jacob Hale supported Stryker's views in the Transsexual News Telegraph, calling Hart an "issue in a recent transgender community controversy" and one of "three butch/ftm border war figures". However, O'Hartigan claimed in The Phallus Palace that Hale framing the issue as infighting among transsexuals did not represent the truth, which is that there was a strong movement among transsexuals and lesbians at the time to pressure Right to Privacy to change the name of the dinner and to claim Alan Hart as a transsexual man. In 2004, writer Jillian Todd Weiss published an article in the Journal of Bisexuality that claimed Hart's attempted lesbian reclamation was a "gay rewriting of history" and that it showed a "blatant lack of regard for transgendered identities".

Writers in the 2020s for mainstream publications as well as historical societies tend to portray Alan Hart as a transgender man. The Oregon Encyclopedia acknowledges that there was conflict over his identity, but refers to him as "one of the first female-to-male transgender persons to undergo a hysterectomy in the United States and live the remainder of his life as a man". Scientific American referred to Hart as a "trailblazing transgender doctor" in 2021.

== Additional media ==
=== Exhibitions ===
- In 2002 the Aubrey Watzek Library at Lewis & Clark College ran an exhibition on Hart's life and early writings, titled "The Lives of Men": A Literary Glimpse at the Life of Alberta Lucille Hart/Dr. Alan L. Hart, a title drawing on one of Hart's novels. The exhibition's run was extended by nearly a month in light of unexpectedly high interest.
- In 1994, the story of Alan Lucille Hart and Eva Cushman's attendance at Stanford University, along with a brief description of their subsequent lives, was included in the historical exhibition "Coming to Terms: Passionate Friendship to Gay Liberation on the Farm" at Cecil H. Green Library at Stanford. The exhibition was curated by independent scholar Gerard Koskovich; it ran from July through October 1994 and was the subject of a feature article in the Stanford Daily. "The farm" in the exhibition title is a nickname for the Stanford campus.
- Hart and Cushman's story also was featured in a second historical exhibition at Stanford University: "Creating Queer Space at Stanford: Pages From a Student Scrapbook", which was on display in April and May 2004 in the second floor lobby of Tresidder Memorial Union on the Stanford campus. The exhibition was curated by independent scholar Gerard Koskovich, with Stanford undergraduate Hunter Hargraves serving as associate curator.

=== Describing Hart as transsexual/transgender ===
- Bair, Henry. "Lucille Hart Story" and Brian Booth "Alan Hart: A Literary Footnote", in Right to Privacy Ninth Annual Lucille Hart Dinner Booklet (October 6, 1990).
- Bates, Tom. "Decades ago, an Oregon Doctor Tried to Define Gender"" The Oregonian (July 14, 1996).
- Koskovich, Gerard. "Gay at Stanford: Past, Present and Future" (panel discussion sponsored by the Stanford Historical Society at Stanford University, Dec. 3, 2009). Koskovich was one of three presenters; his talk mentions Hart as a forebear of the transgender rights movement. A podcast of the panel is available on the Stanford Historical Society website.

=== Describing Hart as lesbian ===
- Katz, Jonathan. Gay American History: Lesbians and Gay Men in the U.S.A. New York City: Thomas Y. Crowell, 1976.
- Katz, Jonathan Ned. Gay/Lesbian Almanac: A New Documentary. New York City: Harper and Row, 1983.
- Lauderdale, Thomas M., and Cook, Tom. "The Incredible Life and Loves of the Legendary Lucille Hart", Alternative Connection, Vol. 2, Nos. 12 and 13 (September and October 1993).
- Miller, Janet, and Schwartz, Judith. Lesbian Physicians Sideshow, created for American Association of Physicians for Human Rights Conference, Portland, Oregon (August 19, 1993).

=== General works ===
- Booth, Brian. The Life and Career of Alberta Lucille/Dr. Alan L. Hart with Collected Early Writings. Lewis & Clark College, Portland, OR. 1999.
- Koskovich, Gerard. "Private Lives, Public Struggles", Stanford, Vol. 21, No. 2 (June 1993).
- A compilation of Hart's college writings from the Lewis & Clark College Special Collections, accompanied by an overview and timeline of Hart's life by Brian Booth: PDF from Lewis and Clark College.
- Hart, Alan L (1943). These Mysterious Rays: a nontechnical discussion of the uses of X rays and radium, chiefly in medicine. New York: Harper & Brothers. OCLC 1078472674.

== See also ==
- List of LGBT people from Portland, Oregon
