= Extreme heat warning =

Weather warning issued by the U.S. National Weather Service

An extreme heat warning is a notice issued by the National Weather Service of the United States when extremely dangerous heat is expected or occurring. Usually within 24 to 36 hours. The criteria for this warning varies by location.

Extreme heat can pose a threat to human life and other animals, through conditions such as heat stroke, heat exhaustion, dehydration, and other heat-related illnesses.

On March 10, 2025, the National Weather Service updated the Excessive Heat Warning and Watch, and renamed it to the Extreme Heat Warning and Watch, based on a public survey results in 2018.

== Criteria ==
Local offices, particularly those where extreme heat is less frequent or in areas with deserts or mountainous terrain, often have their own criteria; which can vary significantly between different parts of the United States.

== Dangers ==
Due to the extreme illnesses that can occur, athletes should limit their physical activity when an extreme heat warning is issued. According to the National High School Sports Related Injury Surveillance System, High School RIO, an estimated number of 51,943 excessive heat illnesses occurred in nine of the high school sports observed between 2005, 2011, and 2020.

== Example ==
The following is an example of an extreme heat warning and a heat advisory issued by the National Weather Service office in San Antonio, Texas on May 13, 2025 during a heat wave.

233 
WWUS74 KEWX 131753
NPWEWX

URGENT - WEATHER MESSAGE
National Weather Service Austin/San Antonio TX
1253 PM CDT Tue May 13 2025

TXZ171>173-183>193-202>208-217>223-228-141000-
/O.NEW.KEWX.XH.W.0001.250514T1800Z-250515T0200Z/
/O.EXT.KEWX.HT.Y.0001.250513T1800Z-250514T1800Z/
Llano-Burnet-Williamson-Val Verde-Edwards-Real-Kerr-Bandera-
Gillespie-Kendall-Blanco-Hays-Travis-Bastrop-Kinney-Uvalde-Medina-
Bexar-Comal-Guadalupe-Caldwell-Maverick-Zavala-Frio-Atascosa-
Wilson-Karnes-Gonzales-Dimmit-
Including the cities of Boerne, Bastrop, Georgetown, Uvalde,
Leakey, Fredericksburg, Hondo, Pearsall, Lockhart, Del Rio,
Floresville, Eagle Pass, Gonzales, Burnet, Brackettville, San
Antonio, Rocksprings, Kerrville, Blanco, Crystal City, Austin,
Seguin, Bandera, New Braunfels, Carrizo Springs, Llano, San
Marcos, Karnes City, and Pleasanton
1253 PM CDT Tue May 13 2025

...HEAT ADVISORY NOW IN EFFECT UNTIL 1 PM CDT WEDNESDAY...
...EXTREME HEAT WARNING IN EFFECT FROM 1 PM TO 9 PM CDT WEDNESDAY...

* WHAT...For the Heat Advisory, air temperatures near 104 degrees, 
  except near 110 along the Rio Grande. For the Extreme Heat 
  Warning, dangerously hot conditions with air temperatures of 105 
  to 108 degrees, with near 115 degrees along the Rio Grande.

* WHERE...A portion of south central Texas.

* WHEN...For the Heat Advisory, until 1 PM CDT Wednesday. For the 
  Extreme Heat Warning, from 1 PM to 9 PM CDT Wednesday.

* IMPACTS...Heat related illnesses increase significantly during 
  extreme heat and high humidity events. Hot temperatures and high 
  humidity may cause heat illnesses.

PRECAUTIONARY/PREPAREDNESS ACTIONS...

Drink plenty of fluids, stay in an air-conditioned room, stay out of 
the sun, and check up on relatives and neighbors.

To reduce risk during outdoor work, the Occupational Safety and 
Health Administration recommends scheduling frequent rest breaks in 
shaded or air conditioned environments. Anyone overcome by heat 
should be moved to a cool and shaded location. Heat stroke is an 
emergency! Call 9 1 1.

&&

$$

== See also ==
- Heat index - (HI) is a measure of temperature as perceived by humans, combining actual air temperature and relative humidity, in shaded areas.
- Wet-bulb globe temperature - (WBGT) is a measure of environmental heat as it affects humans and animals.
- Extreme cold warning – the polar opposite of an extreme heat warning
