= National Weather Service Wichita, Kansas =

NWS Forecast Office serving central Kansas

Wichita, Kansas Weather Forecast Office
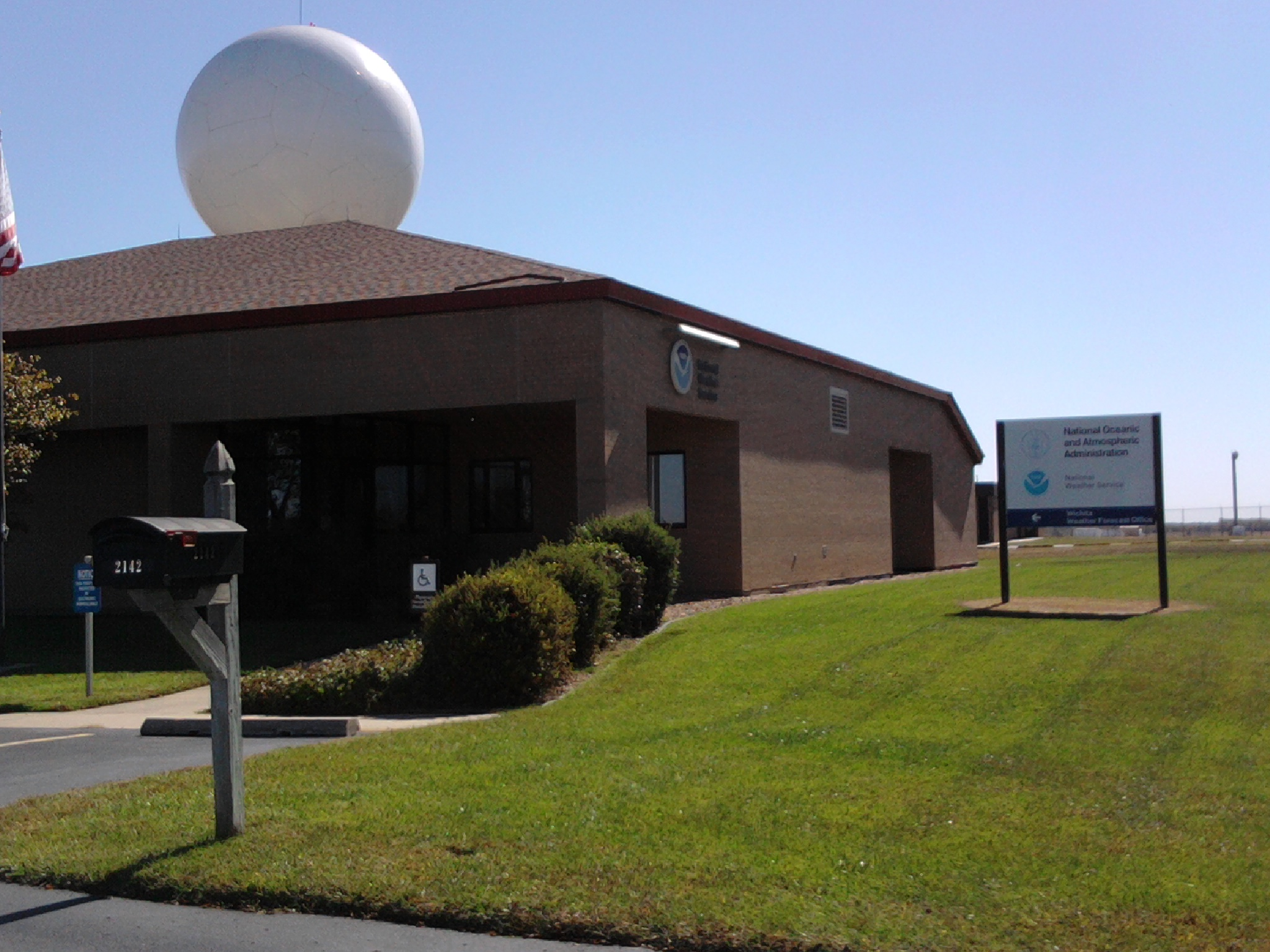
- Wichita, KS NWS Forecast Office.

Agency overview
- Jurisdiction: Federal Government of the United States
- Headquarters: 2142 S. Tyler Road, Wichita, KS; 37°39′17.7″N 97°26′36.1″W
- Employees: 23*
- Agency executives: Suzanne Fortin, Meteorologist in Charge (MIC); Chance Hayes, Warning Coordination Meteorologist (WCM)
- Parent agency: National Weather Service
- Website: www.weather.gov/ict/

Map
- Location of the National Weather Service Wichita, Kansas and its county warning area.

The National Weather Service in Wichita, Kansas or simply known by storm reporters (NWS Wichita) is a local weather forecast office of the National Weather Service responsible for monitoring weather conditions and alerts for 26 counties in central, east-central, south-central, and southeastern Kansas, including the Wichita Metropolitan Area and Salina, Kansas.

== History ==
The Army Signal Service established a federal weather office in the region on June 13, 1888. On April 1, 1930, the Wichita Municipal Airport (currently McConnell Air Force Base) weather office opened. Pilot Balloons were sent at 5:30 am and pm each day, and from April 1, 1930, to November 29, 1940, there were two Weather Bureau Offices in Wichita.

=== Present day ===
The current National Weather Service Wichita is located at 2142 S. Tyler Road in the southwestern part of Wichita, near Eisenhower Airport, and is in charge of issuing local forecasts and weather warnings for central, south central, and southeastern Kansas. It is one of four National Weather Service offices located in Kansas and one of seven that serve the state. In the event that the office becomes temporarily unable to perform its duties, NWS Wichita's primary backup office (the office that would take over until NWS Wichita was able to resume service) is the National Weather Service office in Topeka, Kansas, with the secondary backup office being the National Weather Service office in Dodge City, Kansas. One particular example of this happening was during the April 14th, 2012 outbreak, with an EF3 tornado threatening the Mid-Continental Airport (Eisenhower), prompting the office to hand over operations to NWS Topeka.

== NOAA Weather Radio ==
NWS Wichita operates six NOAA Weather Radio transmitters to serve Central, South-Central and Southeast Kansas:

- KEC59, which broadcasts from Wichita on the frequency of 162.550 MHz, serves the following counties, either wholly or in part: Butler, Cowley, Harper, Harvey, Kingman, McPherson, Reno, Sedgwick, and Sumner.
- WXK95, which broadcasts from Erie on the frequency of 162.400 MHz, serves the following counties: Allen, Labette, Montgomery, Neosho, Wilson, Woodson, Bourbon§, Cherokee§, and Crawford§.
- WXK92, which broadcasts from Ellsworth on the frequency of 162.400 MHz, serves the following counties: Barton, Ellsworth, Lincoln, McPherson, Rice, Russell, and Saline.
- WWH22, which broadcasts from Beaumont on the frequency of 162.500 MHz, serves the following counties, either wholly or in part: Butler, Chase, Chautauqua, Cowley, Elk, Greenwood, and Woodson.
- WZ2511, which broadcasts from Sharon on the frequency of 162.400 MHz, serves the following counties:
  - In Kansas, Harper, Kingman, Reno, Barber§, Pratt§, and Stafford§.
  - In Oklahoma, Alfalfa§, Grant§, and Woods§.
- KPS511, which broadcasts from Great Bend on the frequency of 162.500 MHz, serves the following counties: Barton, Ellsworth, Reno, Rice, Russell, Pawnee§, Rush§, and Stafford§.

N.B. Counties marked with a § are outside the Wichita WFO's County Warning Area.
