= Freeze watch =

Notice warning of sub-freezing temperatures within 48 hours

A freeze watch is a notice issued by the National Weather Service that announces that temperatures of 32 °F (0 °C) and below is possible in the next 48 hours. This watch is only issued during the growing season when the freezing temperature may damage or kill unharvested crops, which would end the growing season. Farmers are advised to prepare protecting their remaining crops and monitor the forecast.

== Example ==
TXZ200-213-226-227-235>237-300-131200-
/O.NEW.KHGX.FZ.A.0001.181114T0600Z-181114T1500Z/
Fort Bend-Inland Brazoria-Inland Harris-Inland Jackson-
Inland Matagorda-Northern Liberty-Southern Liberty-Wharton-
Including the cities of Alvin, Angleton, Bay City, Cleveland,
Dayton, Devers, Edna, El Campo, First Colony, Ganado, Houston,
Liberty, Mission Bend, Missouri City, Pearland, Pecan Grove,
Rosenberg, Sugar Land, and Wharton
400 PM CST Mon Nov 12 2018

...FREEZE WATCH IN EFFECT FROM LATE TUESDAY NIGHT THROUGH
WEDNESDAY MORNING...

The National Weather Service in Houston/Galveston has issued a
Freeze Watch, which is in effect from late Tuesday night through
Wednesday morning.
* EVENT...Temperatures falling to 29-32 degrees.
* TIMING...Overnight Tuesday into Wednesday morning.
* IMPACT...Sub-freezing temperatures are possible. These
  conditions may kill sensitive vegetation.

PRECAUTIONARY/PREPAREDNESS ACTIONS...

A Freeze Watch means sub-freezing temperatures are possible.
These conditions could kill crops and other sensitive vegetation.

&&

$$

== See also ==
- Freeze warning
- Severe weather terminology (United States)
