= Freeze warning =

Type of warning issued by the US National Weather Service

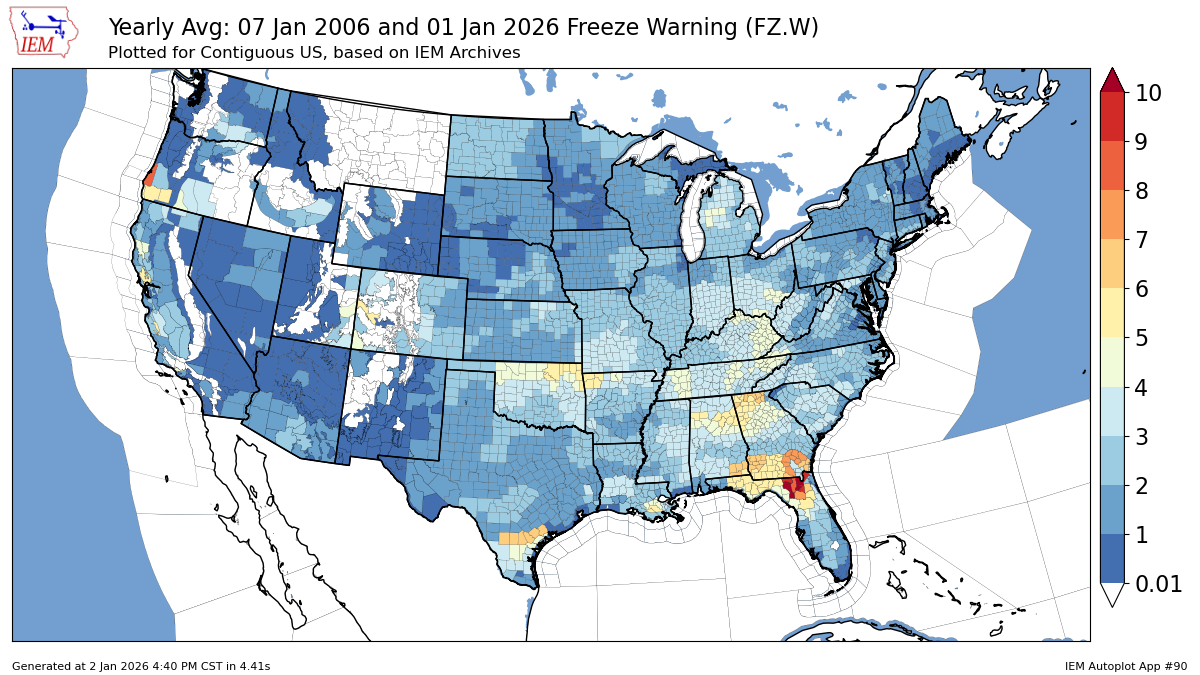
Map of average annual freeze warnings in the United States between 2006 and 2026.

A freeze warning issued in United States is a warning issued by the National Weather Service when the temperature is going to be projected as below 32 °F (0 °C) for a long period of time. This is used if the temperature is low enough to cause the most impact at that time of year.

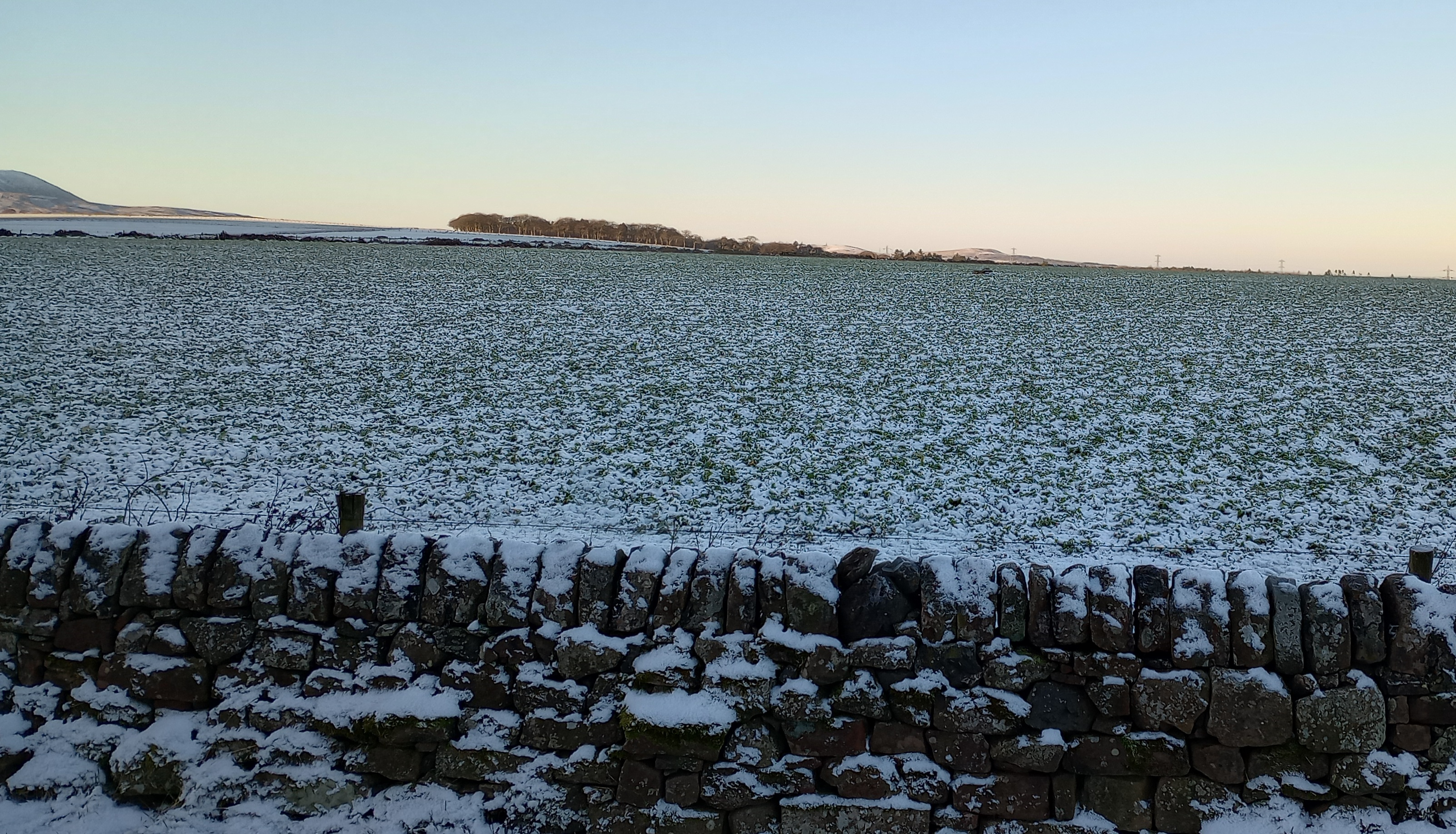
Example of frozen agriculture landscape.

The warning is used in the fall to mark the end of the growing season with the first episode of a widespread freeze. This is due to the temperature threshold that kills certain types of commercial crops and residential plants. However, if the temperature drops below 28 °F (−2 °C) for a length of time it can kill most types of commercial crops and residential plants. The end of growing season occurs in mid to late October west of the Blue Ridge mountains and early November east of the mountains, but if the climate is warm the growing season may extend longer.

At the end of spring, another freeze warning is issued at the start of growing season if it is predicted to cause damage to new plants and crops.

== The Benefit of Freeze Warnings ==
Having a freeze warning is not just used to protect plants from freezing. Many people stand to benefit by abiding and following the precautions placed in a freeze warning. Homeowners, renters, or people who work with water outside stand to benefit from paying attention to freeze warnings because pipes, garden houses, and other equipment that uses water can be damaged in temperatures below freezing. The water freezes and then expands, causing damage to your equipment. One way to tend to this is by storing the equipment in a dry place during the winter season or using insulated pipes and winterizing covers.

A study shows that those who use predictive intervals, or warnings, took more precautionary action than those using deterministic forecasts. Some believe that weather warnings are pointless due to the capacity for the warning to be wrong, making them skeptical to using them. However, both groups, those using predictive intervals and deterministic forecasts, were able to understand the predictive interval verification graphics and use them to correctly identify the best performing forecast periods and achieving better results. By utilizing verification graphics, the National Weather Service is able to increase trust of the public.

== Example ==
URGENT - WEATHER MESSAGE
National Weather Service Cleveland OH
747 AM EDT Sat Oct 17 2026

OHZ003-006>011-013-014-017>023-027>033-036>038-047-PAZ002-003-172000-
/O.CON.KCLE.FZ.W.0006.261018T0500Z-261018T1300Z/
Lucas-Wood-Ottawa-Sandusky-Erie-Lorain-Cuyahoga-Geauga-
Ashtabula Inland-Hancock-Seneca-Huron-Medina-Summit-Portage-Trumbull-
Wyandot-Crawford-Richland-Ashland-Wayne-Stark-Mahoning-Marion-Morrow-
Holmes-Knox-Southern Erie-Crawford-
Including the cities of Perrysburg, Mount Gilead, Brunswick,
Cleveland, South Russell, Alliance, Wooster, Titusville, Bainbridge,
Clyde, Corry, Massillon, Rittman, Edinboro, Port Clinton, Roaming
Shores, Youngstown, Carey, Chesterland, Middlefield, Andover, Bowling
Green, Huron, Elyria, Chardon, Genoa, Jefferson, Cardington, Ravenna,
Millersburg, Union City, Avon Lake, Austintown, Niles, Crestline,
Burton, Mount Vernon, Meadville, Kent, Killbuck, Aurora, Fostoria,
Willard, Findlay, Bellevue, Marion, Toledo, Wadsworth, Bucyrus,
Fremont, Lorain, Medina, Warren, Streetsboro, Upper Sandusky, North
Ridgeville, Tiffin, Boardman, Norwalk, Ashland, Orwell, Oak Harbor,
Canton, Galion, Akron, Orrville, Mansfield, and Sandusky
747 AM EDT Sat Oct 17 2026

...FREEZE WARNING REMAINS IN EFFECT FROM 1 AM TO 9 AM EDT SUNDAY...

* WHAT...Sub-freezing temperatures as low as 30 expected.

* WHERE...Portions of north central, northeast, and northwest Ohio
  and northwest Pennsylvania.

* WHEN...From 1 AM to 9 AM EDT Sunday.

* IMPACTS...Frost and freeze conditions could kill crops, other
  sensitive vegetation and possibly damage unprotected outdoor
  plumbing.

PRECAUTIONARY/PREPAREDNESS ACTIONS...

Take steps now to protect tender plants from the cold.

&&

$$

[5]

== See also ==
- Freeze Watch
- Severe weather terminology (United States)
