= National Weather Service Kansas City/Pleasant Hill, Missouri =

NWS Forecast Office serving west central Missouri, east central Kansas

National Weather Service Weather Forecast Office Pleasant Hill/Kansas City, Missouri

Agency overview
- Formed: July 1, 1888
- Preceding agencies: National Weather Service Kansas City, Missouri; Weather Bureau Kansas City, Missouri
- Jurisdiction: Federal Government of the United States
- Headquarters: 1803 North 7 Highway, Pleasant Hill, Missouri 63072; 35.182°N 97.440°W
- Employees: 25
- Agency executives: Julie Adolphson, Meteorologist in Charge; Andy Bailey, Warning Coordination Meteorologist
- Parent agency: National Weather Service (operating as a branch of the NWS Central Region Headquarters)
- Website: www.weather.gov/eax/

National Weather Service - Pleasant Hill/Kansas City, Missouri (office identification code: EAX) is a Weather Forecast Office (WFO) of the National Weather Service, which is responsible for forecasts and the dissemination of weather warnings and advisories for 37 counties in northern and western Missouri and seven counties in extreme eastern Kansas, including the Kansas City and St. Joseph metropolitan areas. Though, as the Storm Prediction Center (SPC) in Norman, Oklahoma is responsible for issuing severe thunderstorm and tornado watches, the Pleasant Hill/Kansas City WFO only composes outline and status updates for SPC-issued watches affecting any portion of its designated County Warning Area.

The Pleasant Hill Weather Forecast Office – which operates as a branch of the National Weather Service's Central Region Headquarters (CRH) division – manages two Doppler weather radar sites that cover its area of forecasting responsibility, a NEXRAD (WSR-88D) radar, based outside of the Pleasant Hill offices (radar identification code: TLX), serving northeastern Kansas and most of western Missouri; and a Terminal Doppler Weather Radar at Kansas City International Airport (MCI), serving the immediate Kansas City area.

The office is located at 1803 North 7 Highway in the Kansas City suburb of Pleasant Hill, Missouri. NWS Pleasant Hill/Kansas City is currently overseen by Julie Adolphson, who has served as the Meteorologist In Charge of the office since October 2006.

== History ==
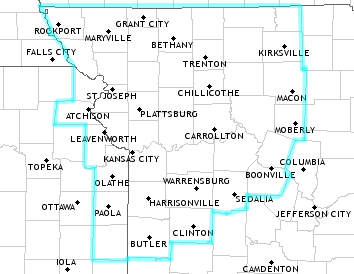
The Pleasant Hill WFO's county warning area, bordered in blue, covers 37 counties in northern and western Missouri and seven counties in extreme eastern Kansas.

On February 9, 1870, President Ulysses Grant signed into law a Joint Congressional Resolution that required the Secretary of War to establish a weather forecasting service for the United States. Tasked with taking and disseminating weather observations from selected sites, this agency was assigned to the Signal Service of the United States Army due to the fact that military discipline was needed and the new service needed to have a reliable communications system. Weather observations were initially to be made at 24 sites, with observations to be taken three times daily at 7:35 a.m., 4:35 and 11:35 p.m. local time. The official observations were then transmitted back to Washington D.C., with other observations to be taken as required.

In 1877, Washington University in St. Louis had assigned observers report temperature and precipitation information from around Missouri. In 1882, the Missouri Legislature approved a bill to establish a statewide weather service. By 1887, the Missouri Climate Network consisted of 77 reporting stations, including one located in Kansas City. A summary of the success of this program was reported to the St. Louis Academy of Science in 1888. By 1888, the number of Signal Corps weather stations had increased into the hundreds; problems between the Department of War and the Signal Corps over the latter's desire for more autonomy had also increased.

On July 1, 1888, the Signal Corps opened its first Weather Service office in Kansas City, located in the U.S. Customs Building on 9th and Walnut Streets, with the commencement of observations. On November 16, 1889, Patrick Conner became the station chief and remained in the position for 41 years until his retirement on August 31, 1930. On May 1, 1890, the office moved its operations into the Rialto Building on 9th Street and Grand Avenue.

On October 1, 1890, President Benjamin Harrison signed an act transferring the responsibilities of the weather service from the Signal Corps to the U.S. Department of Agriculture, establishing the foundation for the new U.S. Weather Bureau that had been laid under the purview of the Signal Corps. On July 1, 1891, the weather stations, telegraph lines, equipment and honorably discharged Signal Corps personnel were transferred to the Department of Agriculture's new civilian Weather Bureau. On July 1, 1907, the bureau offices and primary observation site moved to the Scarritt Building on 9th and Grand.

Between January 1, 1934 and November 2, 1939, portions of the observational program were conducted at both the Post Office Building at the Kansas City Municipal Airport as well as in downtown Kansas City at the New Post Office Building at 315 Pershing Road. On November 2, 1939, the Kansas City office of the Weather Bureau and main observation site migrated to the Administration Building at the Municipal Airport. On June 30, 1940, the U.S. Government transferred the Weather Bureau's operations to the U.S. Department of Commerce.

In 1954, the Severe Local Storms Unit (SELS) – the forerunner of the Storm Prediction Center that was established in March 1952 as the Severe Weather Unit (SWU), an experimental forecasting unit created to provide forecasts for severe thunderstorms and developed the modern-day severe thunderstorm and tornado watch program – relocated its operations from the U.S. Weather Bureau's analysis center in Washington, D.C. to the Kansas City Weather Bureau office at the Municipal Airport; at that time, the unit began disseminating tornado forecasts to the public on a widespread basis, albeit having to undergo a protocol involving the chiefs of the district offices whose regional offices were to be notified to plan to forecast the threat of severe weather and SELS forecasters to determine whether the threat of tornadoes would be mentioned in the public forecast if the threat in question. SELS would ultimately eliminate the end-run that gave the district office chiefs the right of first refusal in deciding whether the threat could be mentioned in the forecasts in 1958, when the Weather Bureau opted to disseminate the SELS-developed forecast to the general public through broadcast and print media.

On May 20, 1957, the Kansas City office released what would serve as the template for tornado warnings, when a public alert was issued for an F5 tornado that developed southwest of Williamsburg, Kansas and went on to devastate the Ruskin Heights neighborhood of Kansas City. Despite the agency's continued reluctance on incorporating references to tornadoes in public warnings to the public, seven years after the U.S. Weather Bureau officially lifted a ban on tornado forecasts, staff meteorologist Joe Audsley issued a statement that a "funnel cloud [was sighted] touching the ground" in Paola, Kansas at 6:30 p.m. that evening, in order to reinforce the severe weather forecast issued by SELS. Audsley – who was reprimanded for issuing a message on a potential tornado (which turned out to be accurate) by the meteorologist in charge of the Weather Bureau office in Sioux City, Iowa, when he worked there in 1947 – relayed an update to the previous alert around 7:30 p.m., this time noting that the Olathe Naval Air Station reported that a tornado was on the ground southeast of Olathe, Kansas and moving "rapidly northeast" into the southeastern portion of the Kansas City area, and subsequently issued additional messages detailing the exact track of the tornado as indicated by radar and reports from airline pilots and the public.

On January 20, 1966, the office moved its operations into the Federal Aviation Administration Building at the Municipal Airport, and became the largest office of the Weather Bureau (which would be renamed the National Weather Service on January 1, 1967) located outside of Washington D.C. The office complex became known as the National Severe Storms Forecast Center (NSSFC), incorporating the observations and SELS units and ten additional units – RADU (which provided analysis of hourly radar reports), Comms (which managed the Weather Bureau's teletype circuits), a District Forecast unit (responsible for oversight of the regional forecast offices in Missouri, Kansas, Iowa and Nebraska), a Flight Advisory unit (which provided aviation forecasts for the Midwestern United States), a WSR-57 radar unit, regional and national public service units, and units for satellite forecasts, atmospheric charting, forecasting computers, and Techniques and Development.

On October 2, 1972, the National Weather Service moved the operations of its regional Weather Service Office (WSO) into a trailer on the southwest portion of Kansas City International Airport; the remainder of the NSSFC's operations, meanwhile, moved into the Federal Building in downtown Kansas City.

On April 15, 1979, the National Weather Service moved into a permanent facility at 1236 Mexico City Avenue, which handled surface observations, severe local warnings and local adaptive forecasts. The office operated an WSR-57 radar and monitored multiple ALERT observation systems, which received rainfall and river stage information. In 1993, the Weather Forecast Office (WFO) began to transfer various operations functions to a new facility located at 1803 North 7 Highway in Pleasant Hill, which also housed the operations of the Missouri Basin River Forecast Center. Randall McKee (who was promoted to the position in December 1991, following the departure of predecessor Beverly Poole, who left the Kansas City WFO in April of that year after four years) retained his duties as the office's Meteorologist in Charge with the move to Pleasant Hill, and remained in that position until January 1994; he was eventually succeeded in October of that year by Lynn Maximuk, who oversaw the office's forecasting operations until April 2006; by the time that Maximuk took over, responsibilities for the dissemination of forecasts and weather warnings for the WFO's area of responsibility were transferred to the Pleasant Hill facility.

Instead of accompanying the Weather Forecast Office to the new Pleasant Hill facility, the National Oceanic and Atmospheric Administration decided to migrate the operations of the National Severe Storms Forecast Center from Kansas City to a wing of the Max Westheimer Airport campus in Norman, Oklahoma in October 1995, when it adopted its current name as the Storm Prediction Center. The office at Kansas City International Airport remained in operation until the summer of 1996, at which time all remaining functions were transferred to the Pleasant Hill building; the WSR-57 radar system near the airport was concurrently decommissioned, as a result of the new NEXRAD radar system based at the airport coming online as part of the nationwide rollout of the advanced radar. In October 2006, Julie Adolphson was appointed as Meteorologist in Charge of the Pleasant Hill office.

== NOAA Weather Radio ==
NOAA Weather Radio logo

The Pleasant Hill Weather Forecast Office maintains ten NOAA Weather Radio transmitters across the northwestern third of Missouri and two in far eastern Kansas to transmit routine extended and specialized short-term forecasts, current weather observations, hazardous weather outlooks and historical weather information. Each of the transmitters, through the Emergency Alert System, also disseminate watches, warnings and advisories issued by the NWS office, severe thunderstorm and tornado watches issued by the Storm Prediction Center and other emergency information to the public.

The office schedules a required weekly test of the Specific Area Message Encoding system for public alert dissemination on all ten NOAA Weather Radio transmitters in the region each Wednesday at 11:00 a.m. and 7:00 p.m. Central Time; exceptions exist if there is a threat of severe weather that day within the listening area of any or all of the stations, in which case the test will be postponed until the following Wednesday, barring that severe weather is not forecast to occur then.

City of license	Call sign	Frequency (MHz)	Service area of transmitter
Cameron, Missouri	KZZ85	162.475 MHz	portions of northwest Missouri
Carrollton, Missouri	KZZ34	162.450 MHz	portions of central Missouri
Galt, Missouri	KZZ38	162.500 MHz	portions of north-central Missouri
Independence, Missouri	KID77	162.550 MHz	Kansas City Metropolitan Area
Lancaster, Missouri	WXM36	162.550 MHz	portions of northeast Missouri and extreme southeast Iowa
La Plata, Missouri	WXM39	162.525 MHz	portions of northeast Missouri
Maryville, Missouri	KZZ37	162.425 MHz	portions of northwest Missouri and extreme southwest Iowa
Parker, Kansas	WZ2512	162.525 MHz	portions of extreme east-central Kansas and extreme west-central Missouri
Shawnee Mound, Missouri	KZZ39	162.500 MHz	portions of west-central Missouri
Wathena, Kansas	KEC77	162.400 MHz	St. Joseph area
