= Cold weather advisory =

US-based weather statement

A cold weather advisory (formerly known as a wind chill advisory until October 2024) is a hazardous weather statement issued by Weather Forecast Offices (WFO) of the National Weather Service (NWS) in the United States to alert the public that temperatures or wind chills are forecast to reach values low enough that it poses a threat to human health and life if adequate protection is not taken against hypothermia and frostbite. The exact criteria meriting the issuance of an advisory vary from state to state, and areas prone to colder temperatures will often require colder temperatures/wind chills before issuing an advisory.

== Example ==
The following is an example of the now deprecated Wind Chill Advisory; this one was issued by the National Weather Service office in Detroit, Michigan on January 21, 2011.

920 
WWUS43 KDTX 212131
WSWDTX

URGENT - WINTER WEATHER MESSAGE
NATIONAL WEATHER SERVICE DETROIT/PONTIAC MI
431 PM EST FRI JAN 21 2011

...EXTREME COLD WIND CHILLS TONIGHT...

.COLD TEMPERATURES IN ADDITION TO WINDS INCREASING TONIGHT AHEAD OF
A LOW PRESSURE SYSTEM WILL ALLOW WIND CHILLS TO DROP BETWEEN -15
AND -20 ACROSS THE NORTHERN THUMB AND SAGINAW VALLEY TONIGHT.

MIZ047>049-053>055-062-063-220545-
/O.NEW.KDTX.WC.Y.0001.110122T0500Z-110122T1500Z/
MIDLAND-BAY-HURON-SAGINAW-TUSCOLA-SANILAC-LAPEER-ST. CLAIR-
INCLUDING THE CITIES OF...MIDLAND...BAY CITY...BAD AXE...
SAGINAW...CARO...SANDUSKY...LAPEER...PORT HURON
431 PM EST FRI JAN 21 2011

...WIND CHILL ADVISORY IN EFFECT FROM MIDNIGHT TONIGHT TO 10 AM
EST SATURDAY...

THE NATIONAL WEATHER SERVICE IN DETROIT/PONTIAC HAS ISSUED A WIND
CHILL ADVISORY...WHICH IS IN EFFECT FROM MIDNIGHT TONIGHT TO
10 AM EST SATURDAY. 

IMPACTS...

 * COLD WIND CHILLS MAY LEAD TO FROST BITE AND HYPOTHERMIA IF
   PRECAUTIONS ARE NOT TAKEN. 

HAZARDOUS WEATHER...

 * WIND CHILLS ARE EXPECTED TO FALL BETWEEN -15 AND -20 DEGREES
   LATE TONIGHT THROUGH TOMORROW MORNING.

PRECAUTIONARY/PREPAREDNESS ACTIONS...

 * A WIND CHILL ADVISORY MEANS THAT VERY COLD AIR AND STRONG
WINDS WILL COMBINE TO GENERATE LOW WIND CHILLS. THIS WILL RESULT
IN FROST BITE AND LEAD TO HYPOTHERMIA IF PRECAUTIONS ARE NOT
TAKEN.  IF YOU MUST VENTURE OUTDOORS...MAKE SURE YOU WEAR A HAT
AND GLOVES.

&&

$$

RK

The following is the first Cold Weather Advisory issued by the National Weather Service. It was issued on November 17, 2024.

URGENT - WEATHER MESSAGE
National Weather Service Sacramento CA
1254 PM PST Sun Nov 17 2024

CAZ068-069-181400-
/O.NEW.KSTO.CW.Y.0001.241119T0600Z-241119T1800Z/
Western Plumas County/Lassen Park-West Slope Northern Sierra
Nevada-
Including the cities of Chester, Quincy, and Blue Canyon
1254 PM PST Sun Nov 17 2024

...COLD WEATHER ADVISORY IN EFFECT FROM 10 PM MONDAY TO 10 AM PST
TUESDAY ABOVE 6000 FEET...

* WHAT...Very cold temperatures 5 to 15 degrees expected at
  elevations above 6000 feet.

* WHERE...West Slope Northern Sierra Nevada and Western Plumas
  County/Lassen Park.

* WHEN...From 10 PM Monday to 10 AM PST Tuesday.

* IMPACTS...Frostbite and hypothermia will occur if unprotected skin
  is exposed to these temperatures. These cold temperatures could be
  hazardous to pets, plants, and those without adequate heating.

PRECAUTIONARY/PREPAREDNESS ACTIONS...

Keep pets indoors as much as possible.

&&

$$

== See also ==
- Severe weather terminology (United States)
