= River flood watch =

Flood advisory in the United States

A river flood watch is issued by the National Weather Service of the United States when flooding at formal forecast points with river gaging sites and established flood stages is possible. Flooding may be caused by various reasons, such as heavy rain in the vicinity of the river, melting snow, and/or ice jams.

== Example ==
The following is an example of a river flood watch issued by the National Weather Service office in Seattle, Washington.

ZCZC SEAFFASEW
WGUS66 KSEW 151139
URGENT - IMMEDIATE BROADCAST REQUESTED
FLOOD WATCH
NATIONAL WEATHER SERVICE SEATTLE WA
339 AM PST THU NOV 15 2007

...THE NATIONAL WEATHER SERVICE IN SEATTLE HAS ISSUED A FLOOD WATCH
FOR THE FOLLOWING RIVERS IN WESTERN WASHINGTON...

   SKOKOMISH RIVER NEAR POTLATCH AFFECTING MASON COUNTY.

.FLOOD BULLETIN NO. 1

HEAVY RAIN OVER THE OLYMPIC MOUNTAINS COULD DRIVE THE SKOKOMISH RIVER
ABOVE FLOOD STAGE LATE TONIGHT OR FRIDAY MORNING.

A VIGOROUS FRONTAL SYSTEM WILL PRODUCE PERIODS OF HEAVY RAIN OVER THE
OLYMPIC PENINSULA TONIGHT...AND SOME SPOTS ON THE SOUTH SLOPES OF
THE OLYMPIC MOUNTAINS COULD RECEIVE MORE THAN THREE INCHES OF RAIN.
THE RAINFALL COULD BE HEAVY ENOUGH TO PRODUCE FLOODING ON THE
SKOKOMISH RIVER.

A FLOOD WATCH MEANS THAT FLOODING IS POSSIBLE BUT NOT IMMINENT OR
CERTAIN. BE READY TO ACT QUICKLY IF THE NATIONAL WEATHER SERVICE
ISSUES A FLOOD WARNING.

WAC045-151839-
/O.NEW.KSEW.FL.A.0004.071115T1139Z-000000T0000Z/
/SRPW1.0.ER.000000T0000Z.000000T0000Z.000000T0000Z.OO/
339 AM PST THU NOV 15 2007

THE NATIONAL WEATHER SERVICE IN SEATTLE HAS ISSUED A
* FLOOD WATCH FOR
  THE SKOKOMISH RIVER NEAR POTLATCH
* UNTIL FURTHER NOTICE.
* AT 2:45 AM THURSDAY THE STAGE WAS 13.0 FEET.
* MINOR FLOODING IS POSSIBLE.
* FLOOD STAGE IS 16.0 FEET.
* FORECAST...FLOOD STAGE MAY BE REACHED BY LATE TONIGHT OR FRIDAY
MORNING.

$$

MCDONNAL
WEATHER.GOV/SEATTLE

== See also ==
- Severe weather terminology (United States)
