= Significant weather advisory =

U.S. hazardous weather warning

A significant weather advisory was a hazardous weather statement issued by certain Weather Forecast Offices (WFO) of the National Weather Service (NWS) in the United States to alert the public about thunderstorm activity below designated severe criteria for or not expected to produce severe weather. The title assigned to the advisory — titled "significant weather alert" or referenced by its originating product, "special weather statement" — varied by the issuing WFO.

Created in April 2002 as an unofficial special weather statement sub-product, the advisory was issued when trained storm spotters or Doppler weather radar indicate that a sub-severe thunderstorm is producing or will soon produce hail or strong winds below NWS-determined severe weather warning criteria. Should conditions favor intensification or severe weather approach the alerted area, a warning may be required. While intense lightning or rainfall caused by the thunderstorm did not merit an advisory on its own, the advisory may also have mentioned the occurrence or likelihood of such phenomena. The NWS ceased usage of the "significant weather advisory" titling in August 2021, although it continues to issue special weather statements for sub-severe thunderstorms when warranted through the agency's local Weather Forecast Offices (WFO).

== Definition ==
An unofficial product issued within a special weather statement (used generally for inclement weather falling below or approaching watch, warning or advisory criteria), individual National Weather Service Weather Forecast Offices (WFO) issued significant weather advisories to inform the general public and local media of thunderstorm activity below severe criteria that posed limited if any threat to life and property, but may impact outdoor activities and commuter travel; other weather situations, including those associated with an accompanying thunderstorm (such as a localized downburst, or an overspreading heat burst or macroburst-type outflow winds associated with a decaying thunderstorm), would occasionally warrant the issuance of an advisory statement.

For non-severe thunderstorm activity, it was typically issued if a storm is capable of producing one or more of the following elements: hail of less than one inch (2.5 cm) in diameter, winds of 40 to 58 mph (64 to 93 km/h), excessive lightning (particularly cloud-to-ground) or locally heavy rainfall accumulations of at least one inch (25 mm) per hour. If the alerted thunderstorm approaches warning criteria or severe weather associated with the storm is presently outside of but forecast to reach the advisory area, additional wording would be included in the product to advise the public, media outlets and trained spotters to monitor the weather situation and keep abreast of any warnings that may be issued.

If severe weather is detected, the National Weather Service would replace the significant weather advisory with a severe thunderstorm or tornado warning, which may warrant local communities in the path of the associated severe weather, at their discretion, to activate sirens to warn citizens not watching or listening to media to seek shelter. (This remains the case with convective special weather statements.) If torrential rainfall occurred, a flood advisory or flash flood warning could be issued separately from a significant weather advisory. As with warnings for tornadoes and severe thunderstorms since the October 2007 adoption of storm-based warning products, Weather Forecast Offices (WFO) of the National Weather Service outline significant weather advisories in polygonal shapes for map-based weather hazard products distributed to the main agency and individual WFO websites (including open-source APIs for public weather websites and mobile apps), and the Storm Prediction Center, based on the projected path or affected general area of a storm at the time of the advisory's issuance. In NWS text products, convective special weather statements are usually illustrated by individual counties and equivalent jurisdictions (sections or the entirety thereof, and in list format if it covers more than one jurisdiction), particularly dependent on the jurisdiction's total land area.

The product titling was mainly used by forecast offices located in the National Weather Service's Southern and Central Region Headquarters; for other NWS offices outside that region, in lieu of a significant weather advisory, similarly worded advisory text will be included within a standard special weather statement. References to the "significant weather advisory" and "significant weather alert" terms in First Warning—a broadcast weather alert system derived for use by local television stations—and its derivatives vary by station and market; in most cases, the system's various iterations classify the product by generic thunderstorm-specific terms that predate its creation (i.e., "Heavy T-Storms", "Heavy Storms", "Strong T-Storms").

On July 28, 2021 (or as late as August 2 in certain County Warning Areas), the NWS ceased use of the "significant weather advisory" titling for special weather statements issued for sub-severe thunderstorm events, reverting to utilizing generic headline text outlining that an individual cell, cluster or linear complex of sub-severe thunderstorms will impact certain counties/parishes through the statement's time of expiration. The stylistic product text for thunderstorm-based special weather statements was concurrently reformatted to follow the Impact Based Warning format used for severe convective warnings since 2012, adding and separating out key information about the threat(s), including the threat type/s, information source, and general impacts from the threat/s into bulleted "HAZARD", "SOURCE", and "IMPACT" sections. Additional language was added to the convective special weather statement text to allow for the insertion of basis phenomena tags for waterspouts occurring over inland lakes not within designated marine zones and landspouts.

Because of its lower-level importance, the Emergency Alert System (which begins with a three-burst SAME digital audio activation header and 1050 Hz attention signal, and ends with a quicker End of Message tone) will not be activated to broadcast convective special weather statements; however, such statements are still processed by text-to-speech software for dissemination via NOAA Weather Radio within routine and emergency broadcast cycles.

== Example of a significant weather advisory ==
The following example of a significant weather advisory was issued by the Norman, Oklahoma, National Weather Service on July 14, 2011.

SPECIAL WEATHER STATEMENT
NATIONAL WEATHER SERVICE NORMAN OK
1251 AM CDT THU JUL 14 2011

OKZ015-140600-
DEWEY OK-
1251 AM CDT THU JUL 14 2011

...SIGNIFICANT WEATHER ADVISORY...

THIS SIGNIFICANT WEATHER ADVISORY IS FOR DEWEY COUNTY.

AT 1251 AM CDT...A STRONG THUNDERSTORM WAS LOCATED OVER CAMARGO...
MOVING EAST AT 15 MPH.

HAZARDS INCLUDE...
HAIL UP TO ONE-HALF INCH...
WIND GUSTS TO 50 MPH...
MINOR FLOODING IN AREAS OF POOR DRAINAGE...

SEVERE WEATHER IS NOT EXPECTED AND NO WARNINGS ARE ANTICIPATED AT
THIS TIME.

LAT...LON 3613 9899 3593 9900 3595 9934 3613 9933

$$
WR

== See also ==
- Severe weather terminology (United States)
- Weather warning
