= Freezing spray advisory =

Weather warning and advisory

A Freezing Spray Advisory is issued by the National Weather Service of the United States to warn sea vessels and sometimes road vehicles near the shoreline that accumulation of freezing water droplets and icing due to a combination of cold suspended droplets, wind, and cold air, so vessel movement is possible, however, accumulations are not expected to reach rates of 2 cm per hour, or else a heavy freezing spray watch, warning or a specific notice would be issued.

== Example ==
The following is an example of a Freezing Spray Advisory issued by the National Weather Service office in Seattle, Washington.

000
FZUS76 KSEW 231952
MWSSEW

MARINE WEATHER STATEMENT
NATIONAL WEATHER SERVICE SEATTLE WA
1152 AM PST WED FEB 23 2011

PZZ133-241800-
NORTHERN INLAND WATERS INCLUDING THE SAN JUAN ISLANDS-
1152 AM PST WED FEB 23 2011

...FREEZING SPRAY ADVISORY IN EFFECT FOR THE NORTHERN INLAND WATERS
FROM 8 PM PST THIS EVENING UNTIL LATE THURSDAY MORNING...

THE NATIONAL WEATHER SERVICE HAS ISSUED A FREEZING SPRAY ADVISORY
FOR THE NORTHERN INLAND WATERS FROM 8 PM PST THIS EVENING UNTIL LATE
THURSDAY MORNING.

STRONG FRASER OUTFLOW WILL CAUSE WINDY CONDITIONS WITH TEMPERATURES
FALLING INTO THE MID 20S OVER THE NORTHERN INLAND WATERS TONIGHT.
THIS COMBINATION WILL POSE THE HAZARD OF FREEZING SPRAY OVER THE
WATERS...MAINLY NEAR BELLINGHAM BAY...ROSARIO STRAIT...AND THE FAR
SOUTHERN END OF THE STRAIT OF GEORGIA.

ICE ACCUMULATIONS OF UP TO ONE-TENTH OF AN INCH PER HOUR ARE
POSSIBLE ON BOATS AND SHIPS TRAVERSING THESE WATERS TONIGHT AND
THURSDAY MORNING.

PRECAUTIONARY/PREPAREDNESS ACTIONS...

MONITOR FORECASTS FROM THE NATIONAL WEATHER SERVICE IN SEATTLE
FOR UPDATES ON THIS POTENTIAL EVENT.

&&

$$

HANER
WEATHER.GOV/SEATTLE

== See also ==
- Severe weather terminology (United States)
