= Heavy freezing spray watch =

Weather advisory in the United States

A Heavy Freezing Spray Watch is issued by the National Weather Service of the United States when there is an increased risk of a heavy spray event that meets the necessary criteria, but the occurrence, timing, and/or location are still uncertain. A watch will be issued when forecasters expect freezing water droplets to be able to accumulate on sea vessels at rates of 2 cm per hour or greater. This accumulation must be caused by an "appropriate combination of cold water, wind, cold air temperature, and vessel movement."

== See also ==
- Severe weather terminology (United States)
