= Heavy freezing spray warning =

Weather warning

A Heavy Freezing Spray Warning is issued by the National Weather Service of the United States to warn vessels that rapid accumulation and icing of freezing water droplets due to a combination of cold water, wind, cold air, and vessel or vehicle movement is likely. Accumulation rates of 2 cm per hour or greater must be possible for a warning to be issued, or else a freezing spray advisory would be issued.

== Example ==
The following is an example of a Heavy Freezing Spray Warning issued by the National Weather Service office in Marquette, Michigan.

URGENT - MARINE WEATHER MESSAGE
NATIONAL WEATHER SERVICE MARQUETTE MI
1024 AM EST MON JAN 5 2015

LSZ162-052330-
/O.CON.KMQT.UP.W.0002.000000T0000Z-150110T0600Z/
LAKE SUPERIOR WEST OF A LINE FROM SAXON HARBOR WI TO GRAND
PORTAGE MN BEYOND 5NM-
1024 AM EST MON JAN 5 2015 /924 AM CST MON JAN 5 2015/

...HEAVY FREEZING SPRAY WARNING REMAINS IN EFFECT UNTIL 1 AM EST
/MIDNIGHT CST/ SATURDAY...

A HEAVY FREEZING SPRAY WARNING REMAINS IN EFFECT UNTIL 1 AM EST
/MIDNIGHT CST/ SATURDAY.

* TIMING: EXPECT HEAVY FREEZING SPRAY TO OCCUR UNTIL 1 AM EST
  /MIDNIGHT CST/ SATURDAY.

PLEASE SEE THE LATEST MARINE FORECASTS FOR MORE DETAILED
INFORMATION.

PRECAUTIONARY/PREPAREDNESS ACTIONS...

A HEAVY FREEZING SPRAY WARNING MEANS HEAVY FREEZING SPRAY IS
EXPECTED TO RAPIDLY ACCUMULATE ON VESSELS. THESE CONDITIONS CAN
BE EXTREMELY HAZARDOUS TO NAVIGATION. IT IS RECOMMENDED THAT
MARINERS NOT TRAINED TO OPERATE IN THESE CONDITIONS OR VESSELS
NOT PROPERLY EQUIPPED TO DO SO...REMAIN IN PORT OR AVOID THE
WARNING AREA.

== See also ==
- Severe weather terminology (United States)
