= Hazardous seas warning =

Weather warning for dangerous waves

A Hazardous Seas Warning is issued by the National Weather Service of the United States when wave heights and/or wave steepness values reach certain criteria. These criteria are defined by the local forecast office. Such tall waves can pose a serious threat to vessels that do not seek shelter.

== Example ==
The following is an example of a Hazardous Seas Warning issued by the National Weather Service office in Medford, Oregon.

133 
WHUS76 KMFR 032130
MWWMFR

URGENT - MARINE WEATHER MESSAGE
NATIONAL WEATHER SERVICE MEDFORD OR
230 PM PDT FRI OCT 3 2008

PZZ356-376-041030-
/O.EXT.KMFR.SE.W.0039.000000T0000Z-081005T1200Z/
/O.CON.KMFR.GL.W.0035.000000T0000Z-081004T0900Z/
COASTAL WATERS FROM CAPE BLANCO OR TO PT. ST. GEORGE CA OUT 20 NM-
WATERS FROM CAPE BLANCO OR TO PT. ST. GEORGE CA FROM 20 TO 60 NM-
230 PM PDT FRI OCT 3 2008

...HAZARDOUS SEAS WARNING NOW IN EFFECT UNTIL 5 AM PDT SUNDAY...
...GALE WARNING REMAINS IN EFFECT UNTIL 2 AM PDT SATURDAY...

THE HAZARDOUS SEAS WARNING IS NOW IN EFFECT UNTIL 5 AM PDT
SUNDAY. A GALE WARNING REMAINS IN EFFECT UNTIL 2 AM PDT SATURDAY.

A STRONG FRONT MOVING THROUGH THE WATERS TODAY WILL BRING SOUTH
WINDS OF 35 TO 40 KT WITH OCCASIONAL GUSTS NEAR 50 KT TO THE
AREA. HIGHER GUSTS UP TO 55 KT ARE EXPECTED AROUND CAPE BLANCO.
THESE WINDS WILL PERSIST THROUGH THE LATE EVENING... THEN WILL SHIFT
SOUTHWEST AND GRADUALLY EASE TO 20 TO 30 KT LATE TONIGHT.

AS THE WINDS INCREASE...COMBINED SEAS WILL BUILD TO 12 TO 15 FEET
AT 8 SECONDS. THEN ON SATURDAY...WESTERLY SWELLS OF 15 TO 16 FEET
AT 12 SECONDS WILL ARRIVE..DECREASING TO 9 TO 11 FEET SUNDAY
MORNING.

PRECAUTIONARY/PREPAREDNESS ACTIONS...

A GALE WARNING MEANS THAT CONDITIONS WILL BE HAZARDOUS TO
COMMERCIAL VESSELS AND EXTREMELY HAZARDOUS TO SMALL CRAFT.

A HAZARDOUS SEAS WARNING MEANS THAT WAVES WITH EXTREME STEEPNESS
ARE IMMINENT OR OCCURRING. AREAS THAT ARE PRONE TO SHOALING WILL
BE VERY DANGEROUS.

&&

$$

== See also ==
- Severe weather terminology (United States)
