= Gale watch =

Weather advisory in the United States

A gale watch is issued by the National Weather Service of the United States when there is an increased risk for a gale-force wind event, meaning sustained surface winds, or frequent gusts, of 34 to 47 knots (39 to 54 mph; 63 to 87 km/h), but the occurrence, location, and/or timing of the event is still uncertain.

== Example ==
The following is an example of a gale watch issued by the National Weather Service office in Miami, Florida.

578 
WHUS72 KMFL 111914
MWWMFL

URGENT - MARINE WEATHER MESSAGE
NATIONAL WEATHER SERVICE MIAMI FL
214 PM EST THU FEB 11 2010

...GALE FORCE WINDS POSSIBLE FRIDAY INTO FRIDAY NIGHT...

AMZ650-651-670-671-120930-
/O.CAN.KMFL.SC.Y.0051.000000T0000Z-100211T2300Z/
/O.NEW.KMFL.GL.A.0001.100212T1500Z-100213T0900Z/
COASTAL WATERS FROM JUPITER INLET TO DEERFIELD BEACH, FL OUT
20 NM-
COASTAL WATERS FROM DEERFIELD BEACH TO OCEAN REEF, FL OUT 20 NM-
WATERS FROM JUPITER INLET TO DEERFIELD BEACH, FL EXTENDING FROM
20 NM TO 60 NM-
WATERS FROM DEERFIELD BEACH TO OCEAN REEF, FL EXTENDING FROM
20 NM TO THE TERRITORIAL WATERS OF THE BAHAMAS-
214 PM EST THU FEB 11 2010

...GALE WATCH IN EFFECT FROM FRIDAY MORNING THROUGH LATE FRIDAY
NIGHT...
...SMALL CRAFT ADVISORY IS CANCELLED...

THE NATIONAL WEATHER SERVICE IN MIAMI HAS ISSUED A GALE WATCH...
WHICH IS IN EFFECT FROM FRIDAY MORNING THROUGH LATE FRIDAY NIGHT.
THE SMALL CRAFT ADVISORY FOR THIS AFTERNOON HAS BEEN CANCELLED.

SEAS HAVE SUBSIDED BELOW 7 FEET ACROSS THE GULF STREAM THIS
AFTERNOON. A STRONG LOW PRESSURE SYSTEM WILL PASS NORTH OF THE
REGION FRIDAY EVENING. STRONG SOUTHERLY WINDS ARE EXPECTED TO
DEVELOP FRIDAY AHEAD OF THE LOW...WITH STRONG WESTERLY WINDS
BEHIND THE ASSOCIATED COLD FRONT PASSING DURING THE EVENING HOURS.
SUSTAINED WINDS OF 25 TO 35 KNOTS ARE POSSIBLE WITH FREQUENT GUSTS
TO 40 KNOTS EVEN OUTSIDE OF THUNDERSTORMS. THESE WINDS WILL LEAD
TO EXTREMELY DANGEROUS MARINE CONDITIONS.

PRECAUTIONARY/PREPAREDNESS ACTIONS...

A GALE WATCH IS ISSUED WHEN THE RISK OF GALE FORCE WINDS OF 34 TO
47 KNOTS HAS SIGNIFICANTLY INCREASED...BUT THE SPECIFIC TIMING
AND/OR LOCATION IS STILL UNCERTAIN. IT IS INTENDED TO PROVIDE
ADDITIONAL LEAD TIME FOR MARINERS WHO MAY WISH TO CONSIDER
ALTERING THEIR PLANS.

&&

$$

== See also ==
- Severe weather terminology (United States)
