= River flood warning =

Weather warning indicating river-stem flooding has been observed or is imminent

A river flood warning is issued by the National Weather Service of the United States when forecast points with formal river gaging sites and established flood stages along rivers, where flooding has already been forecast, is imminent or occurring. The National Weather Service defines river flooding as "the inundation of normally dry areas as a result of increased water levels in an established water course."

A typical warning will state the forecast point covered by the warning, the current flood stage, the established flood stage, and the expected crest, which is issued by the River Forecast Center. The crest will usually occur at least six-seven hours after the start of the event and the flooding can be caused by heavy rain in the vicinity of the river, melting snow, or ice jams.

== Example ==
The following is an example of a River Flood Warning issued by the National Weather Service office in Peachtree City, Georgia.

WGUS42 KFFC 240703
FLWFFC
GAC135-250658-


BULLETIN - IMMEDIATE BROADCAST REQUESTED
FLOOD WARNING 
NATIONAL WEATHER SERVICE PEACHTREE CITY GA 
158 AM EST TUE JAN 24 2006

...RIVER FLOOD WARNING FOR PARTS OF THE SUWANEE CREEK...

FOR THE SUWANEE CREEK NEAR SUWANEE...
  THE LATEST STAGE WAS 7.9 FEET AT 2 AM TUESDAY.
  FLOOD STAGE IS 8.0 FEET.
   THE FORECAST FOR THE SUWANEE CREEK NEAR SUWANEE...
      THE RIVER WILL RISE ABOVE FLOOD STAGE AROUND 4 AM TUESDAY.
      THE RIVER WILL CREST NEAR 8.2 FEET AROUND 7 AM TUESDAY.
      THE RIVER WILL FALL BELOW FLOOD STAGE AROUND 12 PM TUESDAY.
                                                   
AT 8.0 FEET...FLOOD STAGE IS REACHED. MINOR FLOODING BEGINS. SUWANEE 
CREEK PARK BEGINS TO FLOOD.  THIS CREST COMPARES TO A PREVIOUS CREST 
OF 8.2 FEET ON SEP 25 1997.  

&&
ALL PERSONS WITH INTERESTS ALONG THE RIVER SHOULD MONITOR THE
LATEST FORECASTS...AND BE PREPARED TO TAKE NECESSARY PRECAUTIONS TO 
PROTECT LIFE AND PROPERTY. DO NOT DRIVE CARS THROUGH FLOODED AREAS. 
IF YOU SEE FLOOD WATERS...REMEMBER TO TURN AROUND AND DO NOT DROWN.

STAY TUNED TO NOAA WEATHER RADIO...WEATHER.GOV...LOCAL TV AND RADIO 
STATIONS...OR YOUR CABLE TV OUTLETS...FOR THE LATEST INFORMATION ON 
THIS EVENT.

FOR GRAPHICAL HYDROLOGICAL INFORMATION...PLEASE GO TO WEATHER.GOV AND
CLICK ON GEORGIA. SELECT RIVERS AND LAKES AHPS UNDER CURRENT 
CONDITIONS. THE ADVANCED HYDROLOGIC PREDICTION SERVICE PAGE PROVIDES 
CURRENT AND FORECAST RIVER INFORMATION...GAGE LOCATIONS...IMPACTS...
AND HISTORICAL CREST INFORMATION FOR ALL FORECAST POINTS BY CLICKING 
ON EACH POINT.

$$

== Emergency ==
The first River Flood Emergency was issued by the National Weather Service in Jacksonville, Florida.

Sunny Mostly Sunny Clear Weather Alert Weather advisories Weather watches Weather

000
WGUS42 KJAX 280222
FLWJAX

BULLETIN - EAS ACTIVATION REQUESTED
FLOOD WARNING
NATIONAL WEATHER SERVICE JACKSONVILLE FL
1022 PM EDT WED JUN 27 2012

FLC003-089-GAC039-049-290200-
/O.NEW.KJAX.FA.W.0030.120628T0222Z-120629T0200Z/
/00000.0.ER.000000T0000Z.000000T0000Z.000000T0000Z.OO/
BAKER FL-CHARLTON GA-CAMDEN GA-NASSAU FL-
1022 PM EDT WED JUN 27 2012

THE NATIONAL WEATHER SERVICE IN JACKSONVILLE HAS ISSUED A

* RIVER FLOOD EMERGENCY FOR THE ST. MARYS RIVER BASIN IN
  BAKER COUNTY IN NORTHEAST FLORIDA...
  NORTHWESTERN NASSAU COUNTY IN NORTHEAST FLORIDA...
  SOUTHERN CAMDEN COUNTY IN SOUTHEAST GEORGIA...
  THIS INCLUDES THE CITIES OF...WOODBINE...ST. MARYS...
  SOUTHEASTERN CHARLTON COUNTY IN SOUTHEAST GEORGIA...

* UNTIL 1000 PM EDT THURSDAY

* A HISTORIC FLOOD IS OCCURRING ON THE ST. MARYS RIVER DUE TO VERY
HEAVY RAINFALL FROM TROPICAL STORM DEBBY. RAPID RISES ALONG THE ST.
MARYS RIVER AND ITS TRIBUTARIES ARE EXPECTED WITHIN THE NEXT 24
HOURS...AND THESE FLOOD WATERS WILL AFFECT RESIDENTS ALONG THE RIVER
BASIN IN NASSAU...BAKER...CHARLTON AND CAMDEN COUNTIES.

AREAS THAT DO NOT NORMALLY FLOOD ALONG THE ST. MARYS RIVER WILL
FLOOD ANYWHERE ALONG THE LENGTH OF THE RIVER. EXTREME FLOODING MAY
OCCUR AT FLEA HILL AND KINGS FERRY WITHIN THE NEXT 24 HOURS TO 36
HOURS. OVERLAND FLOODING WILL EXTEND TO AND CONNECT WITH THE SATILLA
RIVER TO THE NORTH ALONG AND WEST OF THE STATE ROAD 110 IN GEORGIA
EAST OF FOLKSTON.

PRECAUTIONARY/PREPAREDNESS ACTIONS...

RESIDENTS SHOULD CLOSELY MONITOR THE SITUATION WITH A HEIGHTENED
LEVEL OF URGENCY AND NOT WAIT UNTIL THE LAST MINUTE TO EVACUATE. IF
YOU FIND YOURSELF IN IMMEDIATE DANGER PLEASE DIAL 9 1 1.

RESIDENTS AND THOSE WITH INTERESTS ALONG THE ST MARYS RIVER BASIN
SHOULD TAKE IMMEDIATE ACTION TO PROTECT LIFE AND PROPERTY.

FOR NASSAU COUNTY RESIDENTS...A SHELTER HAS BEEN OPENED AT THE
HILLIARD HIGH SCHOOL SHOULD EVACUEES NEED A LOCATION TO STAY UNTIL
RIVER ELEVATIONS HAVE SUBSIDED.

STAY TUNED TO NOAA WEATHER RADIO...COMMERCIAL RADIO OR TELEVISION
STATIONS...OR CABLE TELEVISION FOR ANY UPDATES. FOR ADDITIONAL
INFORMATION...VISIT THE NATIONAL WEATHER SERVICE IN JACKSONVILLE
WEBSITE ON THE INTERNET AT WEATHER.GOV/JAX.

&&

LAT...LON 3066 8147 3067 8161 3075 8196 3068 8200
      3054 8197 3030 8202 3026 8206 3023 8229
      3057 8226 3057 8222 3060 8221 3059 8209
      3081 8204 3086 8193 3093 8190 3099 8176
      3098 8170 3078 8168 3079 8149

$$

ENYEDI

== See also ==
- Severe weather terminology (United States)
