= Special weather statement =

Type of weather advisory

A Special Weather Statement (SAME event code SPS) is a form of weather advisory. Special Weather Statements are issued by the National Weather Service of the United States (NWS) and the Meteorological Service of Canada (MSC). There are no set criteria for special weather statements in either country.

== Definition by region ==
=== United States ===
Local Weather Forecast Offices (WFO) of the National Weather Service may issue a Special Weather Statement to alert of a specified hazard that is approaching or below warning or advisory criteria, that does not have a specific alert product code of their own (such as for widespread funnel clouds with limited to no threat of complete tornadogenesis, the likelihood of landspouts, or strong outflow winds from decaying thunderstorms), to advise of ongoing or imminent hazardous convective weather expected to occur within the geographical area over a one- to two-hour timeframe, major events forecast to occur beyond a six-hour timeframe (such as substantial temperature changes, dense fog and winter weather events), or to outline high-impact events supplementary to information contained in other hazardous weather products (such as black ice, short-duration heavy snow or lake-effect snow bands expected to briefly reduce visibility, heavy rainfall not expected to cause flooding, heat index or wind chill values expected to approach "advisory" criteria for one or two hours, or local areas of blowing dust where wind is below advisory criteria).

Since the NWS discontinued the separate significant weather advisory product in July 2021, Special Weather Statements have been used most commonly to alert of sub-severe thunderstorms (containing sustained winds or gusts of 40–57 mph (64–92 km/h) and/or hail less than one inch (2.5 cm) in diameter, in addition to frequent to continuous lightning and/or funnel clouds not expected to become a tornado threat), and other convective events of short-term impact to travel and outdoor activities (such as snow squalls, bursts of freezing rain, or strong winds or heat bursts produced by decaying thunderstorms) that may not meet warning or advisory criteria. These are also occasionally used to clear counties from severe weather watches. Special Weather Statements may also be issued for possible fire weather conditions (often, at minimum, for an enhanced risk). Sometimes, Special Weather Statements may be issued to update on current weather conditions, but such incidences are typically addressed within the Short-Term Forecast product. An Emergency Alert System (EAS) activation can and may be requested on very rare occasions.

=== Canada ===
Special Weather Statements are issued by regional offices of the Meteorological Service of Canada for weather events that are unusual or those that cause general inconvenience or public concern and cannot adequately be described in a weather forecast. These may include widespread events such as Arctic outflows, Alberta clippers, coastal fog banks, areas of possible thunderstorm development, and strong winds such as chinooks and les suetes winds. They are written in a free style and may also reflect warnings in effect near the United States border.

== See also ==
- Severe weather terminology (United States)
- Severe weather terminology (Canada)
