= River flood advisory =

Weather statement indicating river-stem flooding has been observed or is imminent

A river flood advisory is issued by the National Weather Service of the United States when minor flooding at formal forecast points with river gaging sites and established flood stages is possible. Flooding may have many causes, such as heavy rain in the vicinity of the river, melting snow or ice jams.

== Example ==
The following is an example of a river flood advisory issued by the National Weather Service office in Seattle, Washington.

WGUS86 KSEW 270003
FLSSEW

FLOOD ADVISORY
NATIONAL WEATHER SERVICE SEATTLE WA
403 PM PST SAT APR 26 2005

...THE NATIONAL WEATHER SERVICE HAS ISSUED A FLOOD ADVISORY FOR THE
FOLLOWING RIVER IN WESTERN WASHINGTON...

   SKOKOMISH RIVER NEAR POTLACH AFFECTING MASON COUNTY
. FLOOD BULLETIN NO. 1
HEAVY RAIN WILL FALL OVER THE SOUTHERN OLYMPICS TODAY. THE SNOW
LEVEL WILL BE 5000 TO 6000 FEET. TWO TO THREE INCHES OF RAIN ARE
POSSIBLE TODAY.

DO NOT ATTEMPT TO DRIVE THROUGH FLOODED AREAS...THIS IS THE CAUSE OF
MOST FLOOD RELATED DEATHS IN WASHINGTON.

WAC045-270630-
/O.NEW.KSEW.FL.Y.0003.050427T0415Z-050427T1400Z/
/00000.0.ER.000000T0000Z.000000T0000Z.000000T0000Z.OO/
403 PM PST SAT APR 26 2005

NATIONAL WEATHER SERVICE HAS ISSUED A
* FLOOD ADVISORY FOR
  SKOKOMISH RIVER NEAR POTLATCH
* FROM SATURDAY EVENING UNTIL EARLY SUNDAY MORNING
* AT 345 PM PST SATURDAY THE STAGE WAS...13.9 FEET
* FLOOD STAGE IS...16.0 FEET
* FORECAST... CREST BELOW FLOOD STAGE NEAR 15.7 FEET AROUND 11 PM
  SATURDAY. THEN FALL TO 13.7 FEET SUNDAY MORNING.
* AT 15.0 FEET...THE SKOKOMISH RIVER WILL LOCALY SPILL OVER ITS
  BANKS INTO LOW AREAS OF SKOKOMISH VALLEY.

$$

WEATHER.GOV/SEATTLE

== See also ==
- Severe weather terminology (United States)
