= Hazardous seas watch =

Weather warning and advisory

A Hazardous Seas Watch is issued by the National Weather Service of the United States when there is an increased threat of high wave heights and/or wave steepness values reach a certain criteria, but the occurrence, timing, and/or location are still uncertain, though the area of concern is known. The criteria are set by the local forecast offices. It is normally accompanied with strong winds, and occasionally even cyclonic activity. Such tall waves can pose a serious threat to vessels that do not seek shelter, as well as vehicles and property very close to concerned waters.

== Example ==
The following is an example of a Hazardous Seas Watch issued by the National Weather Service office in Medford, Oregon.

316 
WHUS76 KMFR 102325
MWWMFR

URGENT - MARINE WEATHER MESSAGE
NATIONAL WEATHER SERVICE MEDFORD OR
325 PM PST WED DEC 10 2008

PZZ356-376-120000-
/O.EXT.KMFR.SW.Y.0107.081211T1200Z-081213T0000Z/
/O.CON.KMFR.SI.Y.0119.081211T1200Z-081212T1200Z/
/O.NEW.KMFR.GL.A.0027.081213T0000Z-081213T1200Z/
/O.NEW.KMFR.SE.A.0025.081213T0000Z-081214T1200Z/
COASTAL WATERS FROM CAPE BLANCO OR TO PT. ST. GEORGE CA OUT 20 NM-
WATERS FROM CAPE BLANCO OR TO PT. ST. GEORGE CA FROM 20 TO 60 NM-
325 PM PST WED DEC 10 2008

...SMALL CRAFT ADVISORY FOR HAZARDOUS SEAS NOW IN EFFECT FROM
4 AM THURSDAY TO 4 PM PST FRIDAY...
...SMALL CRAFT ADVISORY FOR WINDS REMAINS IN EFFECT FROM 4 AM
THURSDAY TO 4 AM PST FRIDAY...
...GALE WATCH IN EFFECT FROM FRIDAY AFTERNOON THROUGH LATE FRIDAY
NIGHT...
...HAZARDOUS SEAS WATCH IN EFFECT FROM FRIDAY AFTERNOON THROUGH
LATE SATURDAY NIGHT...

THE NATIONAL WEATHER SERVICE IN MEDFORD HAS ISSUED A GALE WATCH...
WHICH IS IN EFFECT FROM FRIDAY AFTERNOON THROUGH LATE FRIDAY
NIGHT. A HAZARDOUS SEAS WATCH HAS ALSO BEEN ISSUED. THIS
HAZARDOUS SEAS WATCH IS IN EFFECT FROM FRIDAY AFTERNOON THROUGH
LATE SATURDAY NIGHT. THE SMALL CRAFT ADVISORY FOR HAZARDOUS SEAS
IS NOW IN EFFECT FROM 4 AM THURSDAY TO 4 PM PST FRIDAY. A SMALL
CRAFT ADVISORY FOR WINDS REMAINS IN EFFECT FROM 4 AM THURSDAY TO
4 AM PST FRIDAY. 

COMBINED SEAS WILL BUILD TO 10 TO 11 FEET THURSDAY THROUGH FRIDAY.
NORTH WINDS WILL INCREASE TO 15 TO 25 KT THURSDAY AND THURSDAY NIGHT.

PRECAUTIONARY/PREPAREDNESS ACTIONS...

A SMALL CRAFT ADVISORY FOR HAZARDOUS SEAS MEANS THAT WAVES WILL
BE STEEP ENOUGH TO CREATE A POTENTIAL HAZARD TO SMALL CRAFT.

SMALL CRAFT CONDITIONS FOR WIND MEANS THAT WIND SPEEDS OF 23 TO
33 KNOTS ARE EXPECTED. INEXPERIENCED MARINERS...ESPECIALLY THOSE
OPERATING SMALLER VESSELS SHOULD AVOID NAVIGATING IN THESE
CONDITIONS.

A GALE WATCH IS ISSUED WHEN THE RISK OF GALE FORCE WINDS OF 34 TO
47 KNOTS HAS SIGNIFICANTLY INCREASED...BUT THE SPECIFIC TIMING
AND/OR LOCATION IS STILL UNCERTAIN. IT IS INTENDED TO PROVIDE
ADDITIONAL LEAD TIME FOR MARINERS WHO MAY WISH TO CONSIDER
ALTERING THEIR PLANS.

A HAZARDOUS SEAS WATCH IS ISSUED WHEN THE RISK OF HAZARDOUS SEAS
HAS SIGNIFICANTLY INCREASED...BUT THE SPECIFIC TIMING AND/OR
LOCATION IS STILL UNCERTAIN.  IT IS INTENDED TO PROVIDE
ADDITIONAL LEAD TIME FOR MARINERS WHO MAY WISH TO CONSIDER
ALTERING THEIR PLANS.

&&

$$

== See also ==
- Severe weather terminology (United States)
