= Coastal flood watch =

Flood advisory in the United States

A coastal flood watch is issued by the National Weather Service of the United States when coastal flooding along the coast of the Atlantic Ocean, Pacific Ocean, Arctic Ocean, or the Gulf of Mexico is possible. The flooding must be due to water being forced from the nearby body of water onto land, and not from rainfall. Nor'easters, hurricanes, tropical storms, and thunderstorms can all lead to the issuance of a coastal flood watch.

== Example ==
The following is an example of a coastal flood watch issued by the National Weather Service office in Norton, Massachusetts.

462
WHUS41 KBOX 130725
CFWBOX

URGENT - IMMEDIATE BROADCAST REQUESTED
Coastal Hazard Message
National Weather Service Boston/Norton MA
325 AM EDT Mon Mar 13 2023

MAZ007-015-016-019-022-132030-
/O.NEW.KBOX.CF.A.0001.230315T0700Z-230315T1200Z/
Eastern Essex MA-Suffolk MA-Eastern Norfolk MA-
Eastern Plymouth MA-Barnstable MA-
325 AM EDT Mon Mar 13 2023

...COASTAL FLOOD WATCH IN EFFECT FROM LATE TUESDAY NIGHT THROUGH
WEDNESDAY MORNING...

* WHAT...Up to one foot of inundation above ground level
  possible in low-lying areas near shorelines and tidal
  waterways (2.1 to 12.9 feet Mean Lower Low Water).

* WHERE...Eastern Massachusetts coast from the Merrimack River
  to Cape Cod.

* WHEN...From late Tuesday night through Wednesday morning.
* IMPACTS...Flooding is up to one foot deep and affects more
  vulnerable shore roads, including Morrissey Boulevard in Boston.

* ADDITIONAL DETAILS...Large waves may produce pockets of moderate
  flooding along the ocean shoreline in places such as Gloucester,
  Revere, Hull, and Scituate. Flooding could be 1 to 2 feet deep in
  some locations and debris could wash onto coastal roadways.
  Significant beach erosion is also possible.

PRECAUTIONARY/PREPAREDNESS ACTIONS...

If travel is required, allow extra time as some roads may be
closed. Do not drive around barricades or through water of
unknown depth. Take the necessary actions to protect flood-prone
property.

&&

&&

Time of high total tides are approximate to the nearest hour.

Gloucester Harbor
MLLW Categories - Minor 11.5 ft, Moderate 13.0 ft, Major 15.0 ft
MHHW Categories - Minor 2.0 ft, Moderate 3.5 ft, Major 5.5 ft

             Total      Total    Departure
 Day/Time    Tide       Tide     from Norm   Waves    Flood
            ft MLLW    ft MHHW       ft       ft      Impact
 --------  ---------  ---------  ---------  -------  --------
 13/04 AM  10.2/10.7   0.7/ 1.1   0.8/ 1.3     6       None
 13/04 PM   8.9/ 9.4  -0.7/-0.2   0.6/ 1.1    5-6      None
 14/05 AM  10.4/10.9   0.9/ 1.4   1.1/ 1.6    6-8      None
 14/05 PM  10.0/10.5   0.5/ 1.0   2.0/ 2.5   13-17     None
 15/06 AM  10.7/11.2   1.2/ 1.7   1.5/ 2.0   12-15     Minor
 15/06 PM   8.9/ 9.4  -0.7/-0.2   1.0/ 1.5   8-10      None

Merrimack River near Newburyport MA
MLLW Categories - Minor 11.0 ft, Moderate 12.0 ft, Major 13.5 ft
MHHW Categories - Minor 1.5 ft, Moderate 2.5 ft, Major 4.0 ft

             Total      Total    Departure
 Day/Time    Tide       Tide     from Norm   Waves    Flood
            ft MLLW    ft MHHW       ft       ft      Impact
 --------  ---------  ---------  ---------  -------  --------
 13/04 AM   9.2/ 9.7  -0.3/ 0.2   0.8/ 1.3     5       None
 13/05 PM   8.1/ 8.6  -1.5/-1.0   0.7/ 1.1     5       None
 14/05 AM   9.5/10.0   0.0/ 0.5   1.1/ 1.6    4-5      None
 14/05 PM   9.0/ 9.5  -0.6/-0.1   2.1/ 2.6   8-10      None
 15/06 AM  10.0/10.5   0.5/ 1.0   1.6/ 2.0   9-10      Minor
 15/07 PM   7.8/ 8.4  -1.7/-1.2   0.9/ 1.4    5-7      None

Boston Harbor
MLLW Categories - Minor 12.5 ft, Moderate 14.0 ft, Major 15.0 ft
MHHW Categories - Minor 2.4 ft, Moderate 3.9 ft, Major 4.9 ft

             Total      Total    Departure
 Day/Time    Tide       Tide     from Norm   Waves    Flood
            ft MLLW    ft MHHW       ft       ft      Impact
 --------  ---------  ---------  ---------  -------  --------
 13/04 AM  10.6/11.1   0.5/ 1.0   0.8/ 1.3     1       None
 13/04 PM   9.4/ 9.9  -0.8/-0.2   0.7/ 1.1     2       None
 14/05 AM  11.0/11.5   0.9/ 1.4   1.3/ 1.8     2       None
 14/05 PM  10.4/10.9   0.2/ 0.8   2.0/ 2.5     2       None
 15/06 AM  12.3/12.8   2.2/ 2.7   2.6/ 3.1     2      Minor
 15/06 PM   9.3/ 9.8  -0.9/-0.4   1.1/ 1.6     2       None

Revere
MLLW Categories - Minor 12.5 ft, Moderate 14.5 ft, Major 16.0 ft
MHHW Categories - Minor 2.6 ft, Moderate 4.6 ft, Major 6.1 ft

             Total      Total    Departure
 Day/Time    Tide       Tide     from Norm   Waves    Flood
            ft MLLW    ft MHHW       ft       ft      Impact
 --------  ---------  ---------  ---------  -------  --------
 13/04 AM  10.6/11.1   0.7/ 1.1   0.8/ 1.3     1       None
 13/04 PM   9.3/ 9.8  -0.7/-0.2   0.7/ 1.1    1-2      None
 14/04 AM  10.8/11.3   0.9/ 1.4   1.2/ 1.7     2       None
 14/05 PM  10.2/10.7   0.2/ 0.8   1.9/ 2.3     2       None
 15/05 AM  12.1/12.6   2.2/ 2.7   2.6/ 3.1     2      Minor-Mdt
 15/06 PM   9.1/ 9.6  -0.9/-0.4   1.1/ 1.6     2       None

Scituate MA
MLLW Categories - Minor 11.5 ft, Moderate 13.5 ft, Major 15.5 ft
MHHW Categories - Minor 1.8 ft, Moderate 3.8 ft, Major 5.8 ft

             Total      Total    Departure
 Day/Time    Tide       Tide     from Norm   Waves    Flood
            ft MLLW    ft MHHW       ft       ft      Impact
 --------  ---------  ---------  ---------  -------  --------
 13/04 AM  10.2/10.7   0.5/ 1.0   0.8/ 1.3     5       None
 13/04 PM   9.0/ 9.5  -0.8/-0.2   0.7/ 1.1     5       None
 14/05 AM  10.6/11.1   0.9/ 1.4   1.2/ 1.7    5-7      None
 14/05 PM  10.1/10.6   0.4/ 0.9   2.0/ 2.5   11-14     None
 15/06 AM  12.0/12.5   2.2/ 2.7   2.6/ 3.1   11-13    Minor-Mdt
 15/06 PM   9.1/ 9.6  -0.7/-0.2   1.2/ 1.7    7-8      None

Buzzards Bay at Woods Hole
MLLW Categories - Minor 5.5 ft, Moderate 7.0 ft, Major 8.5 ft
MHHW Categories - Minor 3.5 ft, Moderate 5.0 ft, Major 6.5 ft

             Total      Total    Departure
 Day/Time    Tide       Tide     from Norm   Waves    Flood
            ft MLLW    ft MHHW       ft       ft      Impact
 --------  ---------  ---------  ---------  -------  --------
 13/01 PM   2.5/ 3.0   0.5/ 1.0   0.7/ 1.1    2-3      None
 14/01 AM   3.4/ 3.9   1.4/ 1.9   1.3/ 1.8     4       None
 14/01 PM   2.7/ 3.2   0.8/ 1.3   1.3/ 1.8     4       None
 15/02 AM   1.9/ 2.3  -0.2/ 0.3  -0.2/ 0.2    6-7      None
 15/03 PM   2.3/ 2.8   0.4/ 0.9   0.7/ 1.1     5       None

Chatham MA - East Coast
MLLW Categories - Minor 9.0 ft, Moderate 11.5 ft, Major 13.0 ft
MHHW Categories - Minor 1.3 ft, Moderate 3.8 ft, Major 5.3 ft

             Total      Total    Departure
 Day/Time    Tide       Tide     from Norm   Waves    Flood
            ft MLLW    ft MHHW       ft       ft      Impact
 --------  ---------  ---------  ---------  -------  --------
 13/04 AM   5.9/ 6.4  -1.9/-1.4   0.8/ 1.3    5-6      None
 13/05 PM   4.7/ 5.2  -3.0/-2.5   0.7/ 1.1    5-6      None
 14/05 AM   6.2/ 6.7  -1.6/-1.1   1.1/ 1.6    7-9      None
 14/06 PM   5.0/ 5.5  -2.7/-2.2   1.0/ 1.5   13-14     None
 15/06 AM   6.4/ 6.9  -1.4/-0.9   1.3/ 1.8    12       None
 15/07 PM   5.1/ 5.6  -2.7/-2.2   1.2/ 1.7   9-10      None

Chatham - South side
MLLW Categories - Minor 9.0 ft, Moderate 10.5 ft, Major 11.5 ft
MHHW Categories - Minor 4.5 ft, Moderate 6.0 ft, Major 7.0 ft

             Total      Total    Departure
 Day/Time    Tide       Tide     from Norm   Waves    Flood
            ft MLLW    ft MHHW       ft       ft      Impact
 --------  ---------  ---------  ---------  -------  --------
 13/04 AM   4.7/ 5.2   0.2/ 0.8   0.8/ 1.3    4-5      None
 13/05 PM   4.0/ 4.5  -0.6/-0.1   0.8/ 1.3    4-5      None
 14/06 AM   5.2/ 5.7   0.8/ 1.3   1.2/ 1.7    6-8      None
 14/06 PM   4.2/ 4.7  -0.3/ 0.2   1.1/ 1.6   10-13     None
 15/06 AM   5.2/ 5.7   0.8/ 1.3   1.1/ 1.6   10-11     None
 15/07 PM   4.2/ 4.7  -0.3/ 0.2   1.1/ 1.6    7-9      None

Provincetown Harbor
MLLW Categories - Minor 13.0 ft, Moderate 14.0 ft, Major 15.0 ft
MHHW Categories - Minor 2.9 ft, Moderate 3.9 ft, Major 4.9 ft

             Total      Total    Departure
 Day/Time    Tide       Tide     from Norm   Waves    Flood
            ft MLLW    ft MHHW       ft       ft      Impact
 --------  ---------  ---------  ---------  -------  --------
 13/04 AM  10.7/11.2   0.6/ 1.1   0.8/ 1.3     4       None
 13/04 PM   9.4/ 9.9  -0.8/-0.2   0.6/ 1.1     4       None
 14/05 AM  10.8/11.3   0.7/ 1.1   0.9/ 1.4    6-8      None
 14/05 PM  10.8/11.3   0.7/ 1.1   2.2/ 2.7   12-19     None
 15/06 AM  12.5/13.0   2.3/ 2.8   2.6/ 3.1   13-15     None
 15/06 PM   9.6/10.1  -0.6/-0.1   1.3/ 1.8   9-11      None

Dennis - Sesuit Harbor
MLLW Categories - Minor 13.0 ft, Moderate 14.5 ft, Major 16.0 ft
MHHW Categories - Minor 2.5 ft, Moderate 4.0 ft, Major 5.5 ft

             Total      Total    Departure
 Day/Time    Tide       Tide     from Norm   Waves    Flood
            ft MLLW    ft MHHW       ft       ft      Impact
 --------  ---------  ---------  ---------  -------  --------
 13/04 AM  11.1/11.6   0.6/ 1.1   0.9/ 1.4     3       None
 13/04 PM   9.6/10.1  -1.0/-0.5   0.6/ 1.1    3-4      None
 14/05 AM  11.0/11.5   0.5/ 1.0   0.9/ 1.4    4-6      None
 14/05 PM  11.2/11.7   0.7/ 1.1   2.3/ 2.8   7-10      None
 15/06 AM  12.7/13.2   2.2/ 2.7   2.6/ 3.1    8-9     Minor-Mdt
 15/06 PM  10.1/10.6  -0.5/ 0.0   1.5/ 2.0    6-7      None

Sandwich Harbor
MLLW Categories - Minor 12.0 ft, Moderate 14.0 ft, Major 15.0 ft
MHHW Categories - Minor 1.7 ft, Moderate 3.7 ft, Major 4.7 ft

             Total      Total    Departure
 Day/Time    Tide       Tide     from Norm   Waves    Flood
            ft MLLW    ft MHHW       ft       ft      Impact
 --------  ---------  ---------  ---------  -------  --------
 13/04 AM   9.5/10.0  -0.9/-0.4   0.8/ 1.3     4       None
 13/04 PM   8.3/ 8.8  -2.0/-1.6   0.7/ 1.1    3-4      None
 14/05 AM   9.8/10.3  -0.6/-0.1   1.2/ 1.7    3-5      None
 14/05 PM   9.5/10.0  -0.9/-0.4   2.1/ 2.6   6-10      None
 15/06 AM  11.2/11.7   0.9/ 1.4   2.6/ 3.1    8-9      Minor
 15/06 PM   8.7/ 9.2  -1.7/-1.2   1.4/ 1.9    6-7      None

Wings Neck
MLLW Categories - Minor 6.5 ft, Moderate 9.0 ft, Major 11.5 ft
MHHW Categories - Minor 2.1 ft, Moderate 4.6 ft, Major 7.1 ft

             Total      Total    Departure
 Day/Time    Tide       Tide     from Norm   Waves    Flood
            ft MLLW    ft MHHW       ft       ft      Impact
 --------  ---------  ---------  ---------  -------  --------
 13/01 PM   4.0/ 4.5  -0.5/ 0.0   0.8/ 1.3     3       None
 14/02 AM   5.0/ 5.5   0.6/ 1.1   1.2/ 1.7     3       None
 14/01 PM   4.2/ 4.7  -0.2/ 0.2   1.4/ 1.9     3       None
 15/02 AM   4.0/ 4.5  -0.3/ 0.2   0.2/ 0.8     4       None
 15/03 PM   3.7/ 4.2  -0.7/-0.2   0.7/ 1.1     5       None

&&

$$

== See also ==
- Severe weather terminology (United States)
