= Urban and small stream flood advisory =

Weather statement warning of flooding

An urban and small stream flood advisory is issued when ponding of water of streets, low-lying areas, highways, underpasses, urban storm drains, and elevation of creek and small stream levels is occurring or imminent. Urban and small stream flood advisories are issued for flooding that occurs within three hours after the excessive rainfall. These advisories are issued on a county by county basis by the local Weather Forecast Office and are generally in effect for 3 to 4 hours.

== Example ==
192
WGUS84 KBMX 231943
FLSBMX

Flood Advisory
National Weather Service Birmingham AL
143 PM CST WED JAN 23 2019

ALC047-065-091-105-232245-
/O.NEW.KBMX.FA.Y.0001.190123T1943Z-190123T2245Z/
/00000.N.ER.000000T0000Z.000000T0000Z.000000T0000Z.OO/
Marengo AL-Perry AL-Hale AL-Dallas AL-
143 PM CST WED JAN 23 2019

The National Weather Service in Birmingham has issued a

* Urban and Small Stream Flood Advisory for Poor Drainage Areas
  for...
  Marengo County in southwestern Alabama...
  Perry County in central Alabama...
  Southern Hale County in west central Alabama...
  Northwestern Dallas County in south central Alabama...

* Until 445 PM CST.

* At 139 PM CST, radar indicated one to two inches of rain has
  fallen across the area. Additional rainfall of up to one inch is
  possible during the next one to two hours. This will produce some
  minor flooding of streets and roadways in the area...especially in
  low-lying areas near small creeks and streams or in areas with
  poor drainage.

  * Some locations that will experience flooding include...
Demopolis, Marion, Greensboro, Linden, Uniontown, Jefferson,
Thomaston, Sweet Water, Newbern, Myrtlewood, Faunsdale, Dayton,
Bogue Chitto, Vaiden, Nanafalia, Consul, Magnolia, Wayne, Miller and
Vineland.

PRECAUTIONARY/PREPAREDNESS ACTIONS...

Turn around, don't drown when encountering flooded roads. Most flood
deaths occur in vehicles.

&&

LAT...LON 3217 8801 3228 8802 3231 8796 3228 8793
      3229 8793 3240 8804 3259 8774 3261 8780
      3294 8747 3283 8732 3284 8702 3266 8702
      3266 8697 3220 8735 3227 8751 3213 8752
      3213 8762 3201 8762 3199 8767 3200 8811

$$

== See also ==
- Severe weather terminology (United States)
- Flash Flood Warning
