= Severe weather terminology (United States) =

Terminology used by the National Weather Service to describe severe weather in the US

This article describes severe weather terminology used by the National Weather Service (NWS) in the United States, a government agency operating within the Department of Commerce as an arm of the National Oceanic and Atmospheric Administration (NOAA).

The NWS provides weather forecasts, hazardous weather alerts, and other weather-related products for the general public and special interests through a collection of national and regional guidance centers (including the Storm Prediction Center, the National Hurricane Center and the Aviation Weather Center), and 122 local Weather Forecast Offices (WFO). Each Weather Forecast Office is assigned a designated geographic area of responsibility—also known as a county warning area—that are split into numerous forecast zones (encompassing part or all of one county or equivalent thereof) for issuing forecasts and hazardous weather products.

The article primarily defines precise meanings and associated criteria for nearly all weather warnings, watches, advisories, statements, and other products not associated with hazardous weather issued by the NWS and its sub-organizations (some of which may be specific to certain cities or regions). Related weather scales and general weather terms used by the agency are also addressed.

== Definitions of severe weather alerts ==
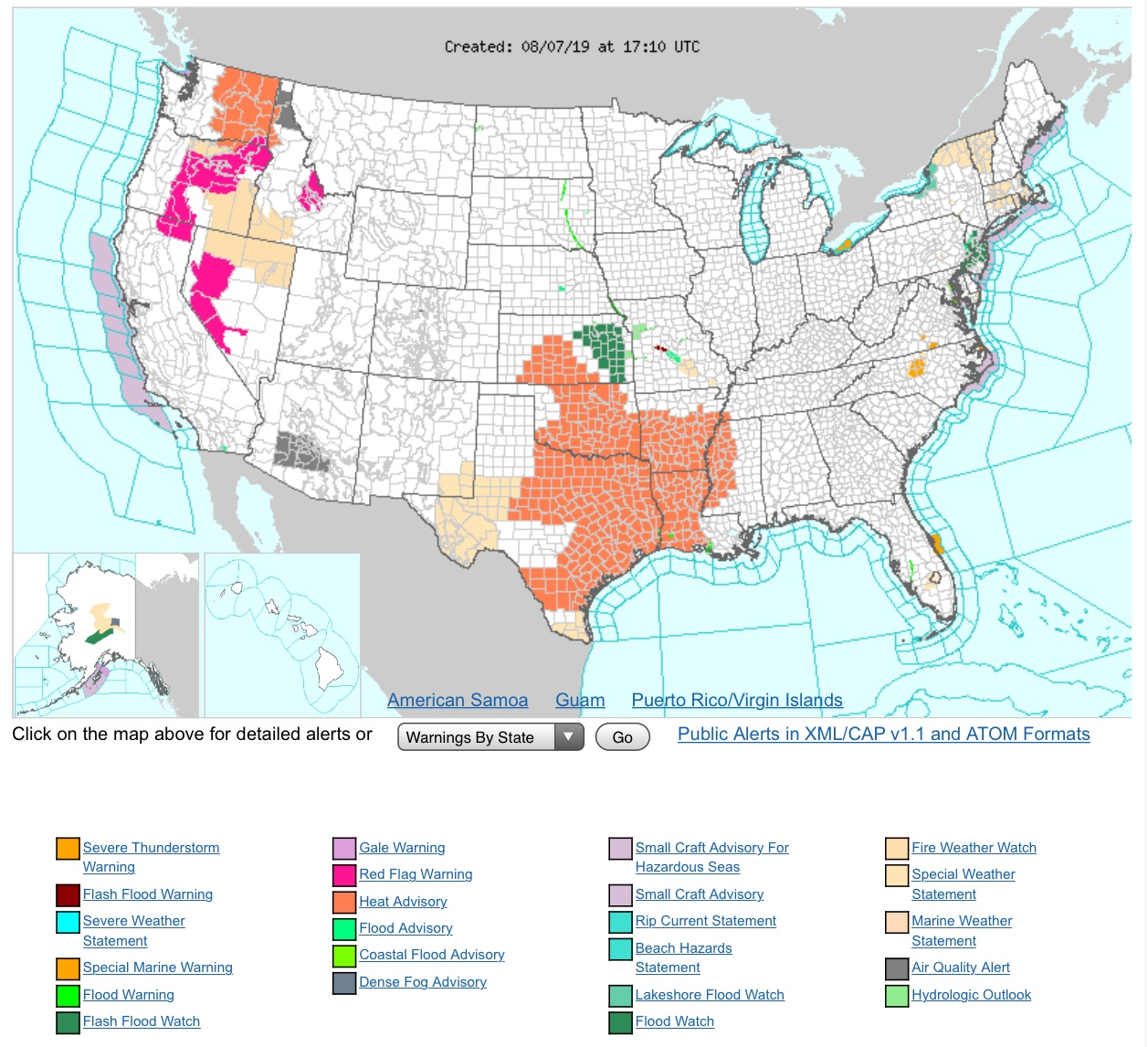
An example of weather alerts on a national map from the National Weather Service

The NWS divides severe weather alerts into several types of hazardous/hydrologic events:

- **Severe local storms** – Short-fused, small-scale hazardous weather or hydrologic events produced by thunderstorms (including large hail, damaging winds, tornadoes, and flash floods).
- **Winter storms** – Weather hazards associated with freezing or frozen precipitation (freezing rain, sleet, and/or snow), or combined effects of winter precipitation and strong winds.
- **Fire weather** – Weather conditions that contribute to an increased risk and help cause the spread of wildfires.
- **Flooding** – Hazardous hydrological events resulting in temporary inundation of land areas not normally covered by water, often caused by excessive rainfall.
- **Coastal/lakeshore hazards** – Hydrological hazards that may affect property, marine or leisure activities in areas near ocean and lake waters including high surf and coastal or lakeshore flooding, as well as rip currents.
- **Marine hazards** – Hazardous events that may affect marine travel, fishing and shipping interests along large bodies of water, including hazardous seas and freezing spray.
- **Tropical cyclone hazards** – Hazardous tropical cyclone events that may affect property in inland areas or marine activities in coastal waters, resulting in wind damage, storm surge, tornadoes and flooding rain.
- **Non-precipitation hazards** – Weather hazards not directly associated with any of the above including extreme heat or cold, dense fog, high winds, and river or lakeshore flooding.

=== Legend ===
- ––– — Designated color codes used to identify watches, warnings, advisories or other products in NWS hazard maps and other internal products are indicated alongside the event code;
- ––– — Off-white background indicates product does not have an assigned color code
- **SVR** — Product event code in **bold text**; all event codes are indicated following the title of each listed product;
- (NPW) — Product event code in parenthetical regular text; used for products that have both standard and Specific Area Message Encoding (SAME) event codes;
  - SAME product codes assigned to each term for NOAA Weather Radio (NWR) broadcasts are included in products that do not have a specified code are identified where applicable, as defined by NOAA, as:

  - Non-Precipitation Warnings/Watches/Advisories (NPW)
  - Coastal Flood Warnings/Watches/Advisories (CFW)
  - Marine Weather Statement (MWS)
  - Mesoscale Discussion (MCD)
  - Severe Weather Warnings/Watches/Advisories (WSW)

=== Severe local storms ===
- **Tornado watch** **TOA** (**yellow box** in some select NWS documentation, **red box** in most other media) – Conditions are favorable for the development of severe thunderstorms and tornadoes in and close to the watch area. These watches are issued for large areas by the Storm Prediction Center in Norman, Oklahoma, and are usually valid for five to eight hours.
  **Particularly dangerous situation tornado watch** **TOA** – Conditions are favorable for the development of severe thunderstorms capable of producing destructive tornadoes in and close to the watch area. These watches are occasionally issued, and usually mean that a major tornado outbreak is possible, where the potential for multiple strong to violent (EF4 and EF5) tornadoes exists. Usually only reserved for forecast "high-end" severe weather events, this type of watch is usually valid for a longer period of time and issued for a larger area by the Storm Prediction Center in Norman, Oklahoma, than a typical tornado watch.
- **Tornado warning** **TOR** – Strong rotation in a thunderstorm has been indicated by Doppler weather radar or a tornado has been sighted by Skywarn spotters or other persons (such as local law enforcement). These warnings are currently issued on a polygonal basis, are usually issued for a duration of 30 minutes (but can run for as long as one hour), and can be issued without either a tornado watch or a severe thunderstorm watch being already in effect. Tornado warnings may be issued in combination with a Special Marine Warning if the storm affects nearshore or coastal waters.
  **Particularly dangerous situation tornado warning** **TOR** – A large tornado has been confirmed to be producing damage and is moving into and through the warned area. The PDS wording can be incorporated into the text of a tornado warning, either upon its initial issuance or in a "severe weather statement" providing updated information on the storm, when a considerable tornado debris signature is detected on radar or a large tornado is visually observed. (The PDS wording is also incorporated into the boilerplate precautionary/preparedness action statement for tornado emergencies.)
  **Tornado emergency** **TOR** (SVS) – Sent as a "severe weather statement" or as the initial tornado warning, this is a high-end tornado warning issued when a violent tornado is expected to impact a densely populated area. Such warnings have been issued for, among other significant tornado events, the F5-rated tornado that destroyed much of Bridge Creek, Moore and portions of southeastern Oklahoma City, Oklahoma on May 3, 1999 (during which the product was conceived by the NWS Forecast Office in Norman); the EF5 tornado that destroyed much of Greensburg, Kansas on May 4, 2007; the EF4 tornado that hit Tuscaloosa, Alabama on April 27, 2011 (one of 16 tornado emergencies issued during the associated regional outbreak, which holds the all-time record for the most tornado emergencies issued in a 24-hour period); the EF5 tornado that affected Moore and adjacent southern portions of the Oklahoma City area on May 20, 2013; the May 31, 2013 tornado system that went over the Oklahoma City area through portions of Canadian County near and south of the densely populated city of El Reno; the EF4 tornado that affected western portions of the Kansas City area on May 28, 2019; the EF4 tornado that affected several areas in Mississippi on April 12, 2020; and two long-track EF4 tornadoes that affected the Mid-South region (one of which traveled a 165.6-mile (266.5 km) path through portions of western Kentucky, including the city of Mayfield) on December 10–11, 2021. This enhanced form of a tornado warning is issued mainly by Weather Forecast Offices within the National Weather Service's Central and Southern Region Headquarters; a tornado emergency is the highest level of a three-tiered Impact Based Warning system for tornadoes used by all WFOs within the Central Region Headquarters, and eight others within the Eastern, Southern and Western Regions.
- **Severe thunderstorm watch** **SVA** (**pink box** or **blue box** in NWS documents, typically **yellow box** in other media) – Conditions are favorable for the development of severe thunderstorms in and close to the watch area. A severe thunderstorm contains large damaging hail of 1 inch (25 mm) diameter or larger, and/or damaging winds greater than 58 mph (95 km/h or 50 knots) or greater. Isolated tornadoes are also possible (depending on whether atmospheric conditions are sufficient to produce tornadic activity) but not expected to be the dominant severe weather event. These watches are issued for large areas by the Storm Prediction Center in Norman, Oklahoma, and are usually valid for five to eight hours.
  **Particularly dangerous situation severe thunderstorm watch** **SVA** – Conditions are favorable for the development of severe thunderstorms in and close to the watch area. Isolated tornadoes are possible but not expected to be the dominant severe weather event, hence these watches are very rarely issued. An expected severe wind event (derecho) is the mostly likely reason for a PDS severe thunderstorm watch to be issued, with widespread winds greater than 90 mph (150 km/h or 80 knots) possible. These watches are usually valid for a longer period of time and are issued for a larger area by the Storm Prediction Center in Norman, Oklahoma than a typical severe thunderstorm watch. This type of watch is usually only reserved for forecast "high-end" severe weather events. If, however, tornadoes are expected to be a major weather threat in addition to the preceding criteria, then a standard tornado watch (generally not a PDS watch) would be issued instead.
- **Severe thunderstorm warning** **SVR** – A severe thunderstorm is indicated by Doppler weather radar or sighted by Skywarn spotters or other persons, such as local law enforcement. A severe thunderstorm contains large damaging hail of 1 inch (2.5 cm) in diameter or larger, and/or damaging winds of 58 mph (93 km/h) or greater. These warnings are currently issued on a polygonal basis, are usually issued for a duration of 30 minutes to one hour, and can be issued without a severe thunderstorm watch or a tornado watch being already in effect. Because severe thunderstorms can produce tornadoes with little or no advance warning, a severe thunderstorm warning may be upgraded to a tornado warning if strong rotation is indicated or a tornado is sighted. Lightning frequency is not a criterion for issuing a severe thunderstorm warning. Severe thunderstorm warnings may be issued in combination with a special marine warning if the storm affects nearshore or coastal waters.
  **Particularly dangerous situation severe thunderstorm warning** **SVR** – Issued within the initial severe thunderstorm warning or as a complete re-issuance of the previously issued warning, a PDS severe thunderstorm warning indicates a significant severe thunderstorm has been detected by Doppler weather radar and/or observed by Skywarn spotters or other civil defense personnel, and is moving into and through the warned area with the capability of causing significant property damage, and severe injury or fatality to people or animals caught in the storm's path. These may be issued for an ongoing severe wind event (either by a derecho, or from an intense wind core or downburst within a squall line or supercell) containing winds greater than 80 mph (124 km/h or 70 knots), and/or extreme hail of 2.75 inches (70 mm) diameter or larger over a wide area. Specific to this product, the boilerplate PDS wording ("this is a particularly dangerous situation") placed between the storm summary and hazard information in the warning text was replaced in July 2021 with the notation "this is a destructive storm for[...]," highlighting specific locations under greatest threat from extreme winds or hail accompanying the warned storm.
  **Severe thunderstorm emergency** **SVR** (SVS) – Sent as a "severe weather statement" or a complete re-issuance of the severe thunderstorm warning, this is an unofficial, high-end severe thunderstorm warning that is occasionally issued when a significant severe thunderstorm is imminent or impacting a highly populated area. First issued by the National Weather Service office in Cheyenne, Wyoming on August 16, 2019, the National Weather Service does not currently maintain a concrete criterion for issuance, although Weather Forecast Offices that issue or have issued such warnings may use the same criteria meriting a PDS Severe Thunderstorm Warning to indicate life-threatening severe weather conditions that will impact a densely populated area.
- **Severe weather statement** **SVS** – A statement issued to provide updated information for active severe thunderstorm and tornado warnings to the public and emergency managers, with revised information including reports of observed severe weather and the approximate location of the storm cell (as indicated by the most recently updated NEXRAD data) at the time of the statement's issuance. Severe Weather Statements may include notices of cancellation (if the warning is being discontinued entirely, or if sections of counties or county-equivalent jurisdictions are being removed from the continuing warning), or notices of a warning being allowed to expire because the prompting storm has weakened below severe criteria.
- **Flash flood watch** **FFA** (**green box**) – Conditions are favorable for flash flooding or urban flooding in and close to the watch area within the next 36 hours. These watches are issued by the Weather Forecast Office and are usually issued six to 24 hours in advance of expected flood potential. (The Heavy Rainfall Warning product issued by the Meteorological Service of Canada has a similar meaning as an NWS Flash Flood Watch.)
  **Particularly dangerous situation flash flood watch** **FFA** – Conditions are favorable for an extremely elevated level of severe and life-threatening flash flooding beyond the level of a normal flash flood watch in and close to the watch area. These watches are usually issued for a smaller area by the local WFOs than typical flash flood watches, which often span multiple county warning areas, and are usually valid for a longer period of time. This type of watch is usually only reserved for forecast "high-end" flash flood events.
- **Flash flood warning** **FFW** – Flash flooding—either indicated by Doppler weather radar or stream gauges, or reported by Skywarn spotters or local emergency officials—is occurring, imminent, or highly likely in the short term. A flash flood is a flood that occurs within six hours of excessive rainfall and poses a threat to life and/or property, especially in low-lying or flood prone areas (including urban areas with poor drainage, rivers and streams); ice jams and dam failures can also cause flash floods. These warnings are issued on a county by county (or equivalent thereof) basis by the local Weather Forecast Office and are generally in effect for two to six hours, although particularly during tropical cyclones a warning may last for a longer period of time, and occasionally last shorter than two hours.
  **Particularly dangerous situation flash flood warning** **FFW** – Issued within the initial flash flood warning or as a complete re-issuance of the previously issued warning, this indicates widespread, life-threatening flash flooding—caused by excessive rainfall, ice jams or imminent dam failures—has been indicated by Doppler weather radar, emergency personnel or trained observers over a broadly populated area.
  **Flash flood emergency** **FFS** – A flash flood emergency is a high-end usage of the flash flood warning. The flash flood emergency term is used when widespread flooding is occurring, and either, multiple water rescues have been reported in the past few hours, or if highly populated regions are undergoing significant flash flooding likely to cause loss of life and property. This terminology is more widely used during hurricanes with high amounts of moisture (an example is Hurricane Harvey in 2017, during which multiple flash flood emergencies were issued for portions of southeast Texas and southern Louisiana, including the Houston area).
- **Flash flood statement** **FFS** – A hydrological weather statement issued to provide updated information on active flash flood watches and warnings to the public and emergency managers.

==== Deprecated ====
- **Significant weather advisory** **SPS** (alt.: **significant weather alert**) – A strong thunderstorm below severe criteria, containing small hail below 1 inch (2.5 cm) diameter, and/or strong winds of 39–57 miles per hour (63–92 km/h), is indicated by Doppler weather radar and may create some adverse impacts on travel. These advisories are issued as special weather statements written in the style of severe thunderstorm and other short-fused warnings, usually on a county by county (or equivalent thereof) basis. Some areas use an entirely different format (most notably WFOs in the Northeast and Mid-Atlantic), denoting which locations in each county will be affected by the thunderstorm. The NWS ceased use of the "significant weather advisory" titling in July 2021; special weather statements for non-severe thunderstorms concurrently adopted product language following the Impact Based Warning format used for severe convective storms.

=== Winter precipitation ===
- **Winter storm watch** **WSA** – Hazardous winter weather conditions including significant accumulations of snow and/or freezing rain and/or sleet are possible generally within 24 to 48 hours. The generic term, Winter Storm Watch, is used for hazardous winter precipitation in the form of heavy snow, freezing rain or sleet, or a combination of the precipitation types, sometimes accompanied by strong winds. The forecast accumulation criteria for each frozen precipitation type vary significantly over different county warning areas. These watches are issued by local National Weather Service Forecast Offices.
- **Winter storm warning** **WSW** – Hazardous winter weather conditions that pose a threat to life and/or property are occurring, imminent, or highly likely within 12 to 48 hours. The generic term, Winter Storm Warning, is used for hazardous winter precipitation in the form of heavy snow, freezing rain or sleet, or a combination of two or more precipitation types. The forecast accumulation criteria for each frozen precipitation type vary significantly over different county warning areas. The Winter Storm Warning product was restructured to incorporate additional precipitation-specific criteria previously applied to the deprecated heavy snow warning and sleet warning products beginning with the 2008-09 winter storm season.
- **Blizzard warning** **BZW** – Sustained winds or frequent gusts of 35 miles per hour (56 km/h) or greater, accompanying heavy snowfall, frequently reducing visibilities to 1/4 mile (0.40 km) or less is forecast to occur over a period of at least three hours. There are no temperature criteria in the definition of a blizzard, but freezing temperatures of at least 32 °F (0 °C) and 35 miles per hour (56 km/h) winds will create wind chills of at least −16.7 °F (−27.1 °C). A winter storm watch for blizzard conditions is issued when conditions meeting criteria are forecast to occur within 12 to 48 hours.
- **Ice storm warning** **WSW** – Heavy ice accumulations that may cause significant disruptions to travel and public utilities, and damage to trees and utility infrastructure impacting life and property are imminent. The criteria for amounts vary over different county warning areas; accumulations range from 1/4 to 1/2 inch (6.4 to 12.7 mm) or more of freezing rain on elevated horizontal flat surfaces. (Hazardous icing conditions are covered and similar warning criteria are used by the Meteorological Service of Canada for their Freezing Rain Warning product.)
- **Winter weather advisory** **WSW** – Hazardous winter weather conditions are occurring, imminent, or likely. Conditions will cause a significant inconvenience and if caution is not exercised, may result in a potential threat to life and/or property. The generic term, Winter Weather Advisory (which replaced the previously used "Travelers Advisory"), is used for hazardous winter precipitation in the form of snow, freezing rain or freezing drizzle, sleet or blowing snow, or a combination of two or more precipitation types. The forecast accumulation criteria—defined below locally designated warning criteria or based on NWS impact-driven advisory criteria—for at least one of the frozen precipitation elements within a defined 12- or 24-hour period vary significantly over different county warning areas. Originally issued to indicate hazardous travel conditions (usually concurrent with standalone precipitation-specific advisories indicating hazards to life, property and commerce), it was restructured as a general purpose product—deprecating the snow advisory, blowing snow advisory, snow and blowing snow advisory, and sleet advisory products—beginning with the 2008-09 winter storm season (it would later supersede the freezing rain advisory and lake-effect snow advisory products for the 2017-18 winter season).
- **Lake effect snow warning** **WSW** – Very heavy lake-effect snowfall amounts of generally 6 inches (15 cm) in 12 hours or less or 8 inches (20 cm) in 24 hours or less are imminent or highly likely. Lake-effect snow squalls can significantly reduce visibilities with little notice. The NWS had originally discontinued the product, superseded by the winter storm warning for heavy lake-effect snow, on October 15, 2018; however, it reinstated the lake effect snow warning as a standalone product beginning with the 2019–20 winter storm season.
- **Snow squall warning** **SQW** – An intense, generally limited duration, period of moderate to heavy snowfall has been observed by radar. Usually accompanied by strong, gusty surface winds, significantly reduced visibility up to 1/4 mile (0.40 km) or less (which may reach levels creating whiteout conditions), and possibly lightning; temperature drops behind an arctic front that are sufficient to produce flash freezes, in conjunction with a significant reduction in visibility from falling and/or blowing snow, may also serve as a warning criteria factor. Snow accumulation may be significant.

==== Deprecated ====
- **Heavy snow warning** **WSW** – Heavy snowfall amounts are imminent; the criteria for amounts (based on 12-hour and 24-hour minimum accumulations) vary significantly over different county warning areas. Discontinued beginning with the 2008-2009 winter storm season and replaced with the winter storm warning for heavy snow.
- **Sleet warning** **WSW** (alt.: **heavy sleet warning**) – Heavy sleet accumulations of 1 to 2 inches (2.5 to 5.1 cm) or more, which may cause significant disruptions to travel or utilities, are imminent or expected to occur within 12 hours. Discontinued beginning with the 2008-2009 winter storm season and replaced by the winter storm warning for heavy sleet.
- **Sleet advisory** **WSW** – Moderate sleet accumulations of 1/4 to 1 inch (0.64 to 2.54 cm) are imminent or expected to occur within 12 hours. Because sleet usually occurs with other precipitation types, a Winter Weather Advisory will almost always be used in such cases. Discontinued beginning with the 2008-2009 winter storm season and replaced with the winter weather advisory for sleet.
- **Snow advisory** **WSW** – Moderate snowfall amounts are imminent; the criteria for amounts vary significantly over different county warning areas. Under the former definition, a snow advisory could be warranted if lesser snowfall accumulations were forecast to produce travel difficulties, especially early in the winter season. Discontinued beginning with the 2008-2009 winter storm season and replaced by the winter weather advisory for snow.
- **Blowing snow advisory** **WSW** – Sustained winds or frequent gusts of 25 to 35 miles per hour (40 to 56 km/h) accompanied by falling and blowing snow, occasionally reducing visibilities to 1/4 mile (0.40 km) or less, will occur for at least three hours. Discontinued beginning with the 2008-2009 winter storm season and replaced by the Winter Weather Advisory for Blowing Snow.
- **Snow and blowing snow advisory** **WSW** – Sustained winds of 25 to 35 miles per hour (40 to 56 km/h) are expected to be accompanied by falling and blowing snow, occasionally reducing visibilities to 1/4 mile (0.40 km) or less for at least three hours. Discontinued beginning with the 2008-2009 winter storm season and replaced by the winter weather advisory for snow and blowing snow.
- **Lake effect snow watch** **WSW** – Significant amounts of lake-effect snow (generally 6 inches (150 mm) within 12 hours or 8 inches (200 mm) within 24 hours) are possible in the next 12 to 48 hours. Discontinued on October 2, 2017; a winter storm watch is now issued instead.
- **Lake effect snow advisory** **WSW** – Moderate amounts of lake-effect snow (generally 3 to 6 inches [76 to 152 mm]) are expected or occurring. Discontinued on October 2, 2017; a winter weather advisory for lake-effect snow is now issued instead.
- **Freezing rain advisory** **WSW** (alt.: **freezing drizzle advisory**) – Freezing rain or freezing drizzle producing ice accretion of up to 1/4 inch (6.4 mm) that may cause significant travel impairments is expected or occurring. Discontinued on October 2, 2017; a winter weather advisory for freezing rain is now issued instead.
- **Blizzard watch** **WSW** – Sustained winds or frequent gusts of 35 miles per hour (30 kn; 56 km/h) or greater, accompanying considerable falling and/or blowing snow, frequently reducing visibilities to 1/4 mile (0.40 km) or less for a period of three hours or more are possible generally within 12 to 48 hours. The NWS deprecated issuance of blizzard watches in October 2017; a winter storm watch is now issued in its place.

=== Fire weather ===
- **Fire warning** **FRW** – A major, uncontrolled wildfire or structural fire is currently burning in a populated area and/or near major roadways, and evacuation is recommended by local civil authorities.
- **Red flag warning** **FWA** – Extreme burning conditions favor the combustion and rapid spread of wildfires within 12 to 24 hours in areas that have not received precipitation for a short period or are experiencing drought conditions, and which the National Fire Danger Rating System (NFDRS) designates as having a high to extreme fire danger. It is issued primarily to alert fire department officials and firefighters of conditions ideal for the combustion and spread of wildfires. The surface relative humidity (RH) and 10-hour fuel moisture criteria meriting a Fire Weather Watch may vary by state based on local vegetation, topography and distance from major water sources, though forecast sustained winds are usually expected to be 20 miles per hour (32 km/h) or greater.
  **PDS red flag warning** **FWA** – Conditions for wildland fire combustion, rapid growth and behavior are extremely dangerous, due to very dry fuels, very low humidity levels, and strong winds. Introduced in October 2019, it is analogous to particularly dangerous situation wording for severe weather watches and warnings and superseded such wording occasionally applied to red flag warnings previously.
- **Fire weather watch** **FWA** – Conditions expected to become favorable for the rapid spread of wildfires in areas of dry vegetation within 12 to 48 hours or up to 72 hours if the NWS office is reasonably confident that red flag fire conditions will occur. It is issued primarily to alert fire and land management agencies of conditions ideal for the combustion and spread of wildfires. The surface relative humidity and 10-hour fuel moisture criteria meriting a fire weather watch may vary depending by state based on local vegetation, topography and distance from major water sources, though forecast sustained winds are usually expected to be 20 miles per hour (32 km/h) or greater.

=== Flooding ===
- **Areal flood warning** **FLW** – General or areal flooding of streets, low-lying areas, urban storm drains, creeks, and small streams in which there is a serious threat to life or property is occurring, imminent, or highly likely. Flood warnings are usually issued for flooding that occurs more than six hours after the excessive rainfall, or when flooding is imminent/occurring but is not rapid enough to prompt a flash flood warning. These warnings are issued on a polygonal basis by the local Weather Forecast Office and are generally in effect for six to twelve hours.
  **River flood warning** **FLS** (formerly **flood warning for river forecast point**) – Flooding of streams or rivers is occurring, imminent, or highly likely. These warnings are issued either by the River Forecast Centers for the area surrounding affected streams or rivers or on a county by county basis by the local Weather Forecast Office and are generally in effect for an indeterminate period until river gauges in the affected areas record water levels receding below the water body's predetermined flood stage.
- **Areal flood watch** **FLA** – Hydrometeorological conditions favor a threat of areal flooding affecting area streets, rivers, streams, and/or urban storm drains within six to 24 hours. It is intended to inform the public and cooperating agencies (including ambulance services and fire departments that may assist in water rescues) in advance of expected flood potential, even though the occurrence of flooding is neither certain nor imminent.
- **Areal flood advisory** **FLS** – Minor general or areal flooding of streets, low-lying areas, urban storm drains, creeks, and small streams is occurring, imminent, or highly likely within the next one to three hours, but is not expected to substantially threaten life and property. These advisories are issued on a polygonal basis by the local Weather Forecast Office and are generally in effect for three to six hours.
  **River flood advisory** **FLS** – Minor flooding of streams or rivers reaching action stage is occurring, imminent, or highly likely. These advisories are issued on a county by county basis by the local Weather Forecast Office and are generally in effect for a couple of days or longer.
  **Urban and small stream flood advisory** **FLS** – Ponding of water on streets, low-lying areas, highways, underpasses, urban storm drains, and elevation of creek and small stream levels is occurring or imminent. Urban and small stream flood advisories are issued for flooding that occurs within three hours after the excessive rainfall. These advisories are issued on a polygonal basis by the local Weather Forecast Office and are generally in effect for three to four hours. (The watch/warning/advisory display map on the NWS's national and local Forecast Office websites does not display the advisory as an area-specific polygon, instead indicating the affected counties and/or county-equivalent subdivisions.)
- **Flood statement** **FLS** – A hydrological weather statement issued to provide updated information on ongoing flooding along major streams in which there is not a serious threat to life and/or property active or flood warnings to the public and emergency managers; information will be provided on observed (or if a dam is at risk of breaking, updates on the ongoing threat) flooding within the warning area, and current and forecast flood stages for lakes and rivers at the time of the statement's issuance.

=== Coastal/lakeshore hazards ===
- **Coastal flood warning** **CFW** – Coastal flooding from ocean water being forced inland from the nearby body (caused by either nor'easters, tropical cyclones or thunderstorms) is occurring, imminent or highly likely within 12 to 24 hours, and poses a serious threat to life and/or property. WFOs may occasionally issue warnings valid after the second forecast period of the date of validity if a strong likelihood of the event exists or when a longer advance notice is needed for public response.
- **Coastal flood watch** **CFA** – Coastal flooding from ocean water being forced inland from the nearby body is possible within 12 to 48 hours, creating significant impacts to life and/or property.
- **Coastal flood advisory** **CFW** – Minor coastal flooding or tidal overflow is occurring or is imminent within 12 hours. Flooding will not pose a serious threat to lives or property, but will create a nuisance for pedestrian and vehicle travel in the affected area.
- **Storm surge warning** **SSW** – Localized heavy flooding associated with a tropical cyclone from storm surge waves moving inland from the shoreline is occurring or is imminent in the specified area within the next 36 hours, posing a significant threat to life and/or property. A warning may be issued in advance of the cyclone's landfall if other hazardous tropical conditions (such as the onset of tropical storm-force winds) are expected to limit enactment of evacuations and other safety precautions, and may also be issued for adjacent locations that could potentially be isolated by surge inundation. Issued in collaboration between the National Hurricane Center (NHC) and local Weather Forecast Offices, storm surge warnings are only issued for regions in the Atlantic and Gulf Coasts of the conterminous United States.
- **Storm surge watch** **SSA** – Life-threatening inundation from rising water being forced inland by an ongoing or potential tropical, subtropical or post-tropical cyclone is possible within the specified area, generally within 48 hours. Similar criteria included in a Storm Surge Warning for conditions that would limit lead time for undertaking safety precautions and inclusion of areas that may experience isolation from surge inundation also apply to this product. Issued in collaboration between the NHC and local WFOs, storm surge watches are only issued for regions in the Atlantic and Gulf Coasts of the conterminous United States.
- **Lakeshore flood warning** **CFW** – Lakeshore flooding that poses a serious threat to life and/or property is occurring or is imminent in the next 12 to 24 hours.
  **Seiche warning** **CFW** – Rapid, large fluctuations in water level in the Great Lakes (similar to the sloshing in a bath tub) caused by storms or high winds, resulting in both lakeshore flooding and critically low water levels at different times. Issued as a lakeshore flood warning with reference of being a seiche warning.
- **Lakeshore flood watch** **CFW** – Lakeshore flooding that could pose a serious threat to life and/or property is possible within the next 12 to 48 hours.
- **Lakeshore flood advisory** **CFW** – Minor lakeshore flooding that may pose a threat to life and/or property is occurring or is imminent in the next 12 hours.
- **Lake wind advisory** **NPW** – Sustained wind speeds of 20 to 29 miles per hour (32 to 47 km/h) are forecast to persist for one hour or longer on area lakes that may cause hazards for maritime travel; wind speeds meeting advisory criteria may vary depending on the county warning area. The usage of this product is locally determined by each Weather Forecast Office.
- **High surf warning** **SRD** – Destructive, pounding surf poses an especially heightened danger to life, boating and other marine property in and near the surf zone, and may damage property near the shoreline; high surf criteria may vary depending on the region.
- **High surf advisory** **SRD** – Pounding surf poses a danger to life, boating and other marine property within the surf zone; high surf criteria may vary depending on the region.
- **High surf watch** **SRD** – A high surf event due to significant breaking wave action is possible in the next few days.
- **Rip current statement** **SRD** – Describes a risk of rip currents present in the specified area; may be issued as a Beach Hazards Statement.
- **Beach hazards statement** **SRD** – Issued for rip or longshore currents, or other hazards (including chemical or biological hazards) may create life-threatening conditions in lake or ocean waters. Beachgoers will be advised to exercise caution when in or near the water.

=== Marine hazards ===
- **Heavy freezing spray warning** **MWS** – Usually issued for shipping interests when conditions are favorable for the rapid freezing of sea spray on vessels at a rate of more than 2 centimetres (0.79 in) per hour, caused by some appropriate combination of cold water, wind, air temperature and vessel movement.
- **Heavy freezing spray watch** **MWS** – Usually issued for shipping interests when conditions are favorable for a heavy freezing spray event meeting Heavy Freezing Spray Warning criteria but its occurrence, location, and/or timing is still uncertain.
- **Freezing spray advisory** **MWS** – Usually issued for shipping interests when conditions are probability of accumulating frozen sea spray on vessels of less than 2 cm per hour caused by some combination of cold water, wind, air temperature, and vessel movement.
- **Hazardous seas warning** **MWS** – Significant wave heights and/or wave steepness values—independent of strong winds—are forecast to cause rough surf in the warned coastal area and adjacent waters, which could pose a serious threat to vessels that do not move to stable waters or dock. Warning criteria may vary depending on the NWS Weather Forecast Office.
- **Hazardous seas watch** **MWS** – A rough surf event—regardless of forecast wind speeds that may contribute to such an occurrence—is possible in the warned coastal area and adjacent waters, but its occurrence, location, and/or timing remains uncertain. Warning criteria may vary depending on the NWS Weather Forecast Office.
- **Low water advisory** **MWS** – Critically below average water levels over the Great Lakes, coastal marine zones or other tidal marine area, waterway, or river inlet within or adjacent to a marine zone have been observed, and potentially present a hazard to maritime navigation.
- **Marine dense fog advisory** **MWS** – Widespread dense fog reducing visibility to less than 1 mile (1,600 m) covering more than half the area of a marine zone is expected for at least two hours over a 12-hour period, creating hazardous navigation conditions for boaters and other marine vessels.
- **Marine weather statement** **MWS** – The equivalent of a special weather statement at sea, indicating potentially hazardous marine conditions.
- **Special marine warning** **SMW** – A warning to mariners of short-duration hazardous weather conditions (lasting up to two hours) including thunderstorms or squalls with wind gusts of 34 knots (39 mph; 63 km/h) or more, hail 1 inch (2.5 cm) diameter or larger, or waterspouts affecting coastal areas not adequately covered by existing marine warnings. Short-duration mesoscale events (such as a strong cold front, gravity wave or squall line) expected to last two hours or less and produce criteria wind speeds, or volcanic ashfall may also warrant issuance.
  **Particularly dangerous situation special marine warning** **SMW** – A warning to mariners of hazardous weather conditions that present a considerable threat to life and property.
- **Small craft advisory** **SCA** – A warning to mariners of high sustained winds or frequent gusts and/or significant sea or wave heights that may damage or capsize small boats. Only issued by WFOs in coastal regions and the Great Lakes for areas included in the Coastal Waters Forecast or Nearshore Marine Forecast products. Thresholds necessitating the issuance of small craft advisories are determined by the accordant NWS Regional Headquarters.
  **Small craft advisory for hazardous seas** **SCAH** – An advisory to mariners of wave or sea conditions that are potentially hazardous to small boats because of wave height, wave period, steepness, or swell direction, even if wind speeds are expected to fall below locally defined small craft advisory criteria. Only issued by WFOs in coastal regions and the Great Lakes for areas included in the Coastal Waters Forecast or Nearshore Marine Forecast products. Thresholds necessitating the issuance of this type of small craft advisory vary among geographic areas within each NWS Regional Headquarters.
  **Small craft advisory for rough bar** **SCARB** – Waves in or near harbor or river entrances are expected to be especially hazardous to mariners due to the interaction of swell, tidal and/or river currents in relatively shallow water. Thresholds governing the issuance of this type of small craft advisory vary among local geographic areas, and are based upon locally determined parameters such as wave steepness, wind speed and direction, and local bathymetry.
  **Small craft advisory for winds** **SCAW** – Wind speeds may pose potential hazards for maritime activity. Wave heights must remain below standard small craft advisory criteria to merit the issuance of a wind-based advisory. Thresholds necessitating the issuance of wind-based small craft advisories are determined by the accordant NWS Regional Headquarters.
  **Brisk wind advisory** **NPW** – Sea or lake ice is expected and may be hazardous to small marine craft. May be issued as a Small Craft Advisory with reference of being a brisk wind advisory. This advisory is not issued by WFOs serving the Great Lakes region due to the prevalence of ice floes during winter in the lake bodies.

=== Temperature ===
- **Extreme heat warning** **NPW** – Maximum Heat Index (HI) values are forecast to meet or exceed locally defined warning criteria for more than three hours over at least two consecutive days. Excessive Heat Warnings are issued within 12 hours of the onset of the defined heat index criteria. Specific criteria vary among local Weather Forecast Offices, due to climate variability and the effect of excessive heat on the local population. Typical HI values are maximum daytime temperatures above 105 to 110 °F (41 to 43 °C) for up to three hours per day, with minimum nighttime temperatures above 75 °F (24 °C) (criteria may vary slightly by county warning area) for two consecutive days. Warning criteria may be lowered by the issuing WFO if the heat event occurs early in the season, during a multi-day heat wave or during a widespread power outage occurs during a heat event due to severe weather phenomena (such as high winds, severe thunderstorms, or a derecho). This product was previously known as an Excessive Heat Warning until March 4, 2025.
- **Extreme heat watch** **NPW** – Conditions are favorable for an excessive heat event with extreme Heat Index values during the day, combined with nighttime low temperatures of 80 °F (27 °C) or higher that limit perspiration recovery, are forecast to occur to meet or exceed local Excessive Heat Warning criteria in the next 24 to 72 hours. This product was previously known as an Excessive Heat Watch until March 4, 2025.
- **Extreme cold warning** **NPW** – Dangerously cold air temperatures and/or wind chills, capable of causing life-threatening medical conditions (such as severe frostbite and hypothermia) or death associated with accelerated heat loss from exposed skin, are forecast to meet or exceed locally defined warning criteria for more than three hours over at least two consecutive days, regardless of forecast wind speeds that may affect ambient air temperature. Extreme Cold Warnings are issued within 12 hours of the onset of the defined actual or apparent temperature criteria, which varies among local Weather Forecast Offices, due to climate variability and the effect of extreme cold on the local population. The product was first used experimentally by Weather Forecast Offices in North Dakota, South Dakota and Minnesota from January until April 2011, and was reinstated for use by the Alaskan Region WFOs in 2018 as a consolidation of the previously separate Extreme Cold Warning and Wind Chill Warning products. (Note: The Alaskan Region’s criterial definition for Extreme Cold Warnings required shelter temperatures to be −50 °F (−46 °C) or colder and air temperatures to remain below −40 °F (−40 °C) up to the 700 mb (21 inHg) level for three or more consecutive days.) Elsewhere, Extreme Cold Warnings could be issued by local Weather Forecast Offices in the mainland United States as an experimental product using locally appropriate thresholds, usually with little or no wind as a factor. Both this and the Wind Chill Warning product were to have been consolidated into a singular Extreme Cold Warning product for use by WFOs in the rest of the conterminous United States in 2021, accounting for NWS software upgrades; the Extreme Cold Warning formally superseded the Wind Chill Warning in October 2024.
- **Extreme cold watch** **NPW** – Dangerously cold temperatures are possible for a prolonged period of time. Frostbite and hypothermia are likely if exposed to these temperatures. This product replaced the Wind Chill Watch in October 2024.
- **Cold weather advisory** **NPW** – Seasonably cold air temperatures or wind chill values, but not extremely cold values, are expected or occurring. The temperature and wind chill criteria vary significantly over different county warning areas based on climate variability. This product was previously known as a Wind Chill Advisory until October 2024, utilizing regionally variable criteria focused narrowly on apparent temperatures.
- **Freeze warning** **FZW** (NPW) – Minimum shelter temperatures are forecast to be 32 °F (0 °C) or below over a widespread area within 12 to 36 hours, regardless of whether frost concurrently develops on plants, vegetation and other exposed surfaces. Freeze Warnings are usually issued to highlight freezes occurring during the locally defined starting and ending periods of the growing season (as determined by the average dates of the first freeze of Autumn and the last freeze of Spring), and will be intermediately issued when appropriate until the end of the growing season based on criteria set by the Weather Forecast Office.
- **Freeze watch** **NPW** – Issued during the locally defined growing season when conditions are favorable for a freeze event that may damage or kill crops to meet or exceed Freeze Warning criteria within 24 to 48 hours.
- **Frost advisory** **NPW** – Issued during the locally defined growing season when minimum sheltered temperatures are forecast to be near or slightly above freezing (33 to 36 °F [1 to 2 °C]) over an extensive area on nights with good radiational cooling conditions (e.g., light winds and clear skies). Widespread frost can be expected. Frost Advisories are usually issued to highlight frost events occurring during the locally defined starting and ending periods of the growing season, and will be intermediately issued when appropriate until the end of the growing season based on criteria set by the Weather Forecast Office.
- **Heat advisory** **NPW** – High Heat Index (HI) values are forecast to meet or exceed locally defined warning criteria for one or two days. Specific criteria vary over different county warning areas, due to climate variability and the effect of excessive heat on the local population. Usually issued within 12 hours of the onset of conditional advisory criteria, typical HI values are maximum daytime temperatures above 100 to 115 °F (38 to 46 °C) for up to three hours per day, with minimum nighttime temperatures falling within or above the range of 75 to 80 °F (24 to 27 °C) (depending on county warning area criteria) for two consecutive days. Warning criteria may be lowered by the issuing WFO if the heat event occurs early in the season, during a multi-day heat wave or during a widespread power outage occurring during a heat event due to severe weather phenomena (such as high winds, severe thunderstorms, or a derecho).

==== Deprecated ====
- **Wind chill warning** **NPW** – Extreme wind chills, capable of causing life-threatening medical conditions (such as severe frostbite and hypothermia) or death associated with accelerated heat loss from exposed skin, are imminent or occurring. The apparent temperature and wind speed criteria vary significantly over different county warning areas based on climate variability. This product was intended to be deprecated sometime in 2021, and superseded by the Extreme Cold Warning product, which was to have included dual criteria for extreme wind chill and actual temperature values, and have its use expanded to WFOs elsewhere in the conterminous United States; the Wind Chill Warning was finally deprecated in October 2024.
  **Particularly dangerous situation wind chill warning** **NPW** – Extremely low wind chills of −30 °F (−34 °C) or lower creating an enhanced risk of frostbite, hypothermia and death are imminent or occurring. This definitional criteria was consolidated along with the parent Wind Chill Warning product into the Extreme Cold Warning product in October 2024.
- **Wind chill watch** **NPW** – Extreme wind chills that are capable of causing life-threatening medical conditions associated with accelerated heat loss from exposed skin are possible within the next 12 to 48 hours; the apparent temperature and wind speed criteria vary significantly over different county warning areas. This product and its definitional criteria was consolidated into the Extreme Cold Watch product in October 2024.
- **Hard freeze warning** **NPW** – Minimum shelter temperatures are forecast to be 28 °F (−2 °C) or below over a widespread area during the growing season. A hard freeze may occur with or without frost. Temperature criteria may vary slightly in some county warning areas. This product and its definitional criteria was consolidated into the Freeze Warning product in October 2024; hard freeze messaging can be incorporated into the body of the Freeze Warning product when appropriate.
- **Hard freeze watch** **NPW** – Conditions are favorable for widespread sub-freezing temperatures that would meet or exceed Hard Freeze Warning criteria within the next 12 to 48 hours during the locally defined growing season. This product and its definitional criteria was consolidated into the Freeze Watch product in October 2024; hard freeze messaging can be incorporated into the body of the Freeze Watch product when appropriate.

=== Aviation ===
The following advisories are issued by the National Weather Service Aviation Weather Center (outside of Alaska) or Alaska Aviation Weather Unit. Atmospheric ash plume advisories/warnings are also issued by the United States Geological Survey (Aviation Color Codes).

- **Airport weather warning** **AWW** – Addresses weather phenomena (including but not limited to surface wind gusts around or above 40 knots (46 mph), freezing rain, heavy snow or thunderstorms producing cloud-to-ground lightning within 5 miles [8.0 km] of the airport and/or 1/2-inch [1.3 cm] hail) capable of adversely affecting ground operations at regional and international airports. AWWs are intended for the use of airport managers, fixed-base operators, airline ground personnel, and other personnel responsible for the safety of ground operations.
- **Center weather advisory** **CWA** – Advisories issued when conditions just below severe (SIGMET) criteria. CWAs are issued for thunderstorms, turbulence, icing, and ceiling and visibility limits (IFR).
- **SIGMET** (significant meteorological information) **SIG** – Advises of weather that is potentially hazardous to all aircraft and is affecting or is forecast to affect at least 3,000 square miles (8,000 km^{2}).
  - **Convective SIGMET** **SIG** – Implies severe or greater turbulence, severe icing, and low level wind shear. Issued for severe surface weather (including surface winds greater than or equal to 50 knots (93 km/h; 58 mph), hail at the surface greater than or equal to 3/4 inch (19 mm) in diameter, or tornadoes); embedded thunderstorms; line of thunderstorms; thunderstorms greater than or equal to VIP level 4 affecting 40% or more of an area at least 3,000 square miles (7,800 km^{2}).
  - **Non-convective SIGMET** **SIG** – These SIGMETs may be issued for: severe icing; severe or extreme turbulence; dust storms and/or sand storms lowering visibilities to less than 3 miles (5 km); or volcanic ash. SIGMET advisories are issued for six hours during hurricanes and four hours for other weather-related events.
- **Volcanic ash advisories** **VAA** – Advisory issued for all ash plumes detected by satellite imagery, including the location of the volcano, location/description of ash plume, forecast (at 6, 12 and 18 hours), and a graphic of the ash plume location/forecast. VAAs are issued by Volcanic Ash Advisory Centers in Anchorage (Alaska) and Washington (Contiguous United States, Caribbean, Central America, most of the North Pacific, and South America north of 10°S).

VAAs are standardized worldwide by the International Civil Aviation Organization.

=== Tropical weather ===
- **Tropical storm warning** **TRW** – Tropical storm conditions (gale- and storm-force sustained winds of 34 to 63 knots [39 to 72 mph; 63 to 117 km/h]) are expected within the specified coastal or inland area within 36 hours (24 hours for Guam, as locally defined by the NWS Forecast Office in Barrigada) in advance of the forecast onset of tropical-storm-force winds. These winds may be accompanied by storm surge, and coastal and/or river flooding. Tropical Storm Warnings may also be issued in association with a subtropical or post-tropical cyclone.
- **Tropical storm watch** **TRA** – Tropical storm conditions (gale- and storm-force sustained winds of 34 to 63 knots [39 to 72 mph; 63 to 117 km/h]) are possible within the specified coastal or inland area within 48 hours in advance of the forecast onset of tropical-storm-force winds. These winds may be accompanied by storm surge, and coastal and/or river flooding. Tropical Storm Watches may also be issued in association with a subtropical or post-tropical cyclone.
- **Hurricane warning** **HUW** – Hurricane conditions (sustained winds of 64 knots [74 mph; 119 km/h] or greater) are expected within the specified coastal or inland area within 36 hours in advance of the forecast onset of tropical-storm-force winds. A Hurricane Warning can remain in effect if dangerously high storm surge, or a combination of dangerous storm surge and waves continue, even when winds fall below hurricane criteria. (This product is issued as a **Typhoon Warning** by the NWS Forecast Office in Barrigada, Guam, which uses a 24-hour maximum lead time before the onset of tropical-storm-force winds.)
- **Hurricane watch** **HUA** – Hurricane conditions (sustained winds of 64 knots [74 mph; 119 km/h] or greater) are possible within the specified coastal or inland area within 48 hours in advance of the forecast onset of tropical-storm-force winds. (This product is issued as a **Typhoon Watch** by the NWS Forecast Office in Barrigada, Guam and its partnering tropical weather forecasting agency, the Central Pacific Hurricane Center.)
- **Hurricane local statement** **HLS** (alt., **tropical cyclone local statement**) – Issued by NWS Weather Forecast Offices for hurricane-threatened zones within the office's Warning Area, providing detailed weather conditions, evacuation decisions made by local law enforcement and emergency management agencies, and other necessary safety precautions for residents in the cyclone's path.
- **Extreme wind warning** **EWW** – An extreme wind event producing sustained surface winds of 100 knots (120 mph; 190 km/h) or greater, associated with the eyewall of a major hurricane (Category 3 or higher on the Saffir-Simpson Scale), non-convective winds, downslope winds or a derecho is occurring or expected to occur in the specified coastal or inland area within one hour. Extreme Wind Warnings—which should be issued no prior than two hours before the onset of extreme winds—are not issued by WFOs located within the Pacific basin.

=== Other hazards ===
- **Air quality alert** **AQA** – Significant atmospheric pollution (through inhalable particulates or ozone) is expected to accumulate in a given area, and may be hazardous to people suffering from respiratory conditions. Criteria developed in conjunction with the local or state EPA and the product issued at their request.
- **Air stagnation advisory** **ASA** (NPW) – Atmospheric conditions stable enough to cause air pollutants to accumulate in a given area. Criteria are developed in conjunction with the local or state EPA and the product is issued at their request.
- **Ashfall advisory** **NPW** – Ash rain resulting in deposition of less than 1/4 inch (6.4 mm) of ashfall accumulation at the surface is occurring or likely. Ashfall from the large airborne ash plume may originate directly from a volcanic eruption, from the re-suspension (by wind) of a significant amount of relic ash, or by large fires. Ashfall accumulations may affect the health of people suffering from respiratory illnesses.
- **Ashfall warning** **NPW** – A volcano undergoing a major eruption is creating the likelihood of significant impact on the public (with higher risk to the health of people with respiratory illnesses) and maritime activity due to ashfall accumulation forecast to be greater than or equal to 0.25 inches (6.4 mm), significant debris, lava, or lahar flows.
- **Blowing dust advisory** **NPW** – Considerable blowing sand or dust are expected to reduce visibilities to between 1/4 and 1 mile (0.40 and 1.61 km) or less, but greater than 1/4 mile (0.40 km) over a widespread or localized area, caused by strong sustained winds of 25 miles per hour (40 km/h) or greater.
  **Dust advisory** **NPW** – A sudden drop in visibility to 1 mile (1,600 m) or less, but greater than 1/4 mile (400 m), resulting in widespread or localized blowing dust.
- **Blowing dust warning** **NPW** – Life-threatening dust will reduce visibilities to near zero over a widespread or localized area, caused by strong sustained winds of 25 miles per hour (40 km/h) or greater.
- **Dense fog advisory** **NPW** – Widespread or localized fog reducing visibilities of 1/8 to 1/4 mi (0.2 to 0.4 km) or less (up to 1 nmi [1.2 mi; 1.9 km] for marine-based advisories, depending on locally defined criteria) is occurring or is forecast within the next six to 12 hours.
  - **Freezing fog advisory** **NPW** – Widespread dense fog reducing visibility to less than 1/4 mile (400 m) that occurs in a sub-freezing environment, producing very light glazed ice accumulations on exposed surfaces.
- **Dense smoke advisory** **NPW** – Widespread or localized smoke reducing visibilities to 1/4 mi (0.4 km) or less (up to 1 nmi [1.2 mi; 1.9 km] for marine-based advisories, depending on locally defined criteria) is occurring; minimum visibility criteria may be defined by the accordant NWS Regional Headquarters or local Weather Forecast Office.
- **Dust storm warning** **DSW** – Widespread or localized blowing dust reducing visibilities to 1/4 mi (0.4 km) or less, usually caused by sustained winds of 25 miles per hour (40 km/h) or greater, is occurring or imminent.
- **Gale warning** **MWS** – Sustained surface winds or frequent gusts of 34 to 47 knots (39 to 54 mph; 63 to 87 km/h) is either forecast within 24 to 48 hours or is occurring in marine areas. The wind speeds must not be directly associated with a tropical cyclone.
- **Gale watch** **MWS** – A gale-force wind event affecting marine areas producing sustained surface winds or frequent gusts of 34 to 47 knots (39 to 54 mph; 63 to 87 km/h) is forecast within the next few days, but its occurrence, location and/or specific timing remains uncertain.
- **High wind warning** **HWW** – Strong sustained winds of 40 to 73 miles per hour (64 to 117 km/h) for one hour or longer, or wind gusts of 58 miles per hour (93 km/h) or greater for any duration that are not associated with thunderstorms are occurring or will occur within six to 12 hours. Wind speeds may pose a hazard to pedestrian and vehicular travel (including toppling or creating flying debris from unsecured outdoor objects, and the risk of pushing cars outside their lane of travel and overturning high-profile vehicles), and cause disruption of electrical utilities and wired telecommunications services (including the downing of electrical lines). Warning criteria may vary by county warning area based on local climatological strong wind frequency. It is superseded by a tropical storm warning.
- **High wind watch** **HWA** – Strong sustained winds of 40 to 73 miles per hour (64 to 117 km/h) or greater for one hour or more, or wind gusts of 58 to 89 miles per hour (93 to 143 km/h) for any duration are expected within 12 to 48 hours. Wind speeds may pose a hazard to pedestrian and vehicular travel (including toppling or creating flying debris from unsecured outdoor objects, and the risk of pushing cars outside their lane of travel and overturning high-profile vehicles), and cause disruption of electrical utilities and wired telecommunications services (including the downing of electrical lines). Watch criteria may vary depending on the county warning area based on local climatological strong wind frequency.
- **Hurricane force wind warning** **NPW** – Sustained winds or frequent gusts of 64 knots (74 mph; 119 km/h) or greater are being observed or are predicted to occur. The wind speeds must not be directly associated with a tropical cyclone.
- **Hurricane force wind watch** **NPW** – Sustained surface winds or frequent gusts of 64 kilometres per hour (40 mph; 35 kn) or greater are forecast. The expected occurrence, location and/or timing of the wind event may be uncertain but is forecast to take place within the next few days. The wind speeds must not be directly associated with a tropical cyclone.
- **Low water advisory** **MWS** – Water levels are significantly below average levels over major lakes, coastal marine zones, and tidal marine areas, waterway, or river inlet within or adjacent to a marine zone, which could create a hazard to navigation. Issued primarily for areas within the Northern Region Headquarters near the Great Lakes region.
- **Special weather statement** **SPS** – A weather statement issued when a specified hazard is approaching advisory criteria or to highlight upcoming significant weather events. These are issued to advise of ongoing or imminent hazardous convective weather expected to continue/dissipate or expand/decrease in geographical coverage within the next one to two hours, major events forecast to occur beyond a six-hour timeframe (such as substantial temperature changes, dense fog and winter weather events), sub-severe thunderstorms (containing sustained winds or gusts of 40–57 mph (64–92 km/h) and/or hail less than one inch (2.5 cm) in diameter, in addition to frequent to continuous lightning and/or funnel clouds not expected to become a tornado threat), or to outline high-impact events supplementary to information contained in other hazardous weather products (such as black ice, short-duration heavy snow or lake-effect snow bands expected to briefly reduce visibility, heavy rainfall not expected to cause flooding, heat index or wind chill values expected to approach "advisory" criteria for one or two hours, or local areas of blowing dust where wind is below advisory criteria).
  **Particularly dangerous situation special weather statement** **SPS** – An enhanced advisory issued for hazards that do not have a specific code of their own, and pose an exceptionally high risk of damage and loss of life.
- **Storm warning** **MWS** – Sustained surface winds or frequent gusts of 48 to 63 knots (55 to 72 mph; 89 to 117 km/h) is either predicted within 36 hours or occurring. Expected wind speeds are likely to cause significant navigational impairment and/or damage to commercial and recreational boating within the warned area. The wind speeds must not be directly associated with a tropical cyclone.
- **Storm watch** **MWS** – Sustained surface winds or frequent gusts of 48 to 63 knots (55 to 72 mph; 89 to 117 km/h) are forecast to occur, but its occurrence, location and/or timing remains uncertain. Expected wind speeds may cause significant navigational impairment and/or damage to commercial and recreational boating. The wind speeds must not be directly associated with a tropical cyclone.
- **Wind advisory** **NPW** – Strong sustained winds of 31 to 39 miles per hour (50 to 63 km/h) for one hour or longer and/or wind gusts of 46 to 57 miles per hour (74 to 92 km/h) for any duration are expected within the next 12 to 24 hours. Wind speeds may pose a hazard to pedestrian and vehicular travel, topple and/or create flying debris from unsecured outdoor objects, and potentially disrupt public utilities and down electrical lines. Advisory criteria may vary by county warning area depending on local climatology; winds of the standard criteria magnitude occurring over an area that frequently experiences such wind speeds will not necessarily trigger a wind advisory.

=== Non-meteorological hazards and administrative messages ===
The National Weather Service also relays messages for non-weather related hazardous events in text products and NOAA Weather Radio broadcasts:

- **911 telephone outage emergency** **TOE** – Issued when 911 telephone service experiences a network outage over a geographic area or telephone exchange. Alternative phone numbers in which to reach 911 or dispatch emergency personnel will be provided to the public.
- **Administrative message** **ADR** – A non-emergency message providing updated information about an event that is either in progress, has expired or concluded early, pre-event preparation or mitigation activities, post-event recovery operations, or other Emergency Alert System-related administrative matters.
- **Avalanche watch** **AVA** – Indicates conditions are forecast to favor natural or human-induced avalanches that could affect roadways, structures, or backcountry activities.
- **Avalanche warning** **AVW** – Avalanche activity—either natural or human-induced—is ongoing or imminent, and likely to affect roadways, structures or backcountry activities and threaten the lives of people within the avalanche's path. Safety precautions will be recommended or ordered as dictated by state law or local ordinance.
- **Avalanche Advisory** **AVA** – Indicates that conditions may be favorable for the development of avalanches in mountainous regions.
- **Blue alert** **BLU** – Issued by state and local authorities to warn the public of information relating to a law enforcement officer who is missing, seriously injured or was killed in the line of duty, or if there is an imminent, credible threat to an officer. Information on the suspect and safety instructions for if the suspect has been spotted within a specific community may be included. The NWS added the ability to convey these messages to its WFOs on a phased basis beginning in late 2019.
- **Child abduction emergency** **CAE** – An emergency message, usually issued in accordance with an Amber alert, informing the public and law enforcement about a missing child believed to have been abducted. Local or state law enforcement agencies investigating the abduction will provide descriptions of the missing child, suspect or vehicle used by the suspect, and ask the public to notify the requesting agency if they have information on the child's or suspect's whereabouts.
- **Civil danger warning** **CDW** – Assigned a higher priority than a Local Area Emergency and a Civil Emergency Message, this indicates a hazardous event (such as the contamination of local water supply or a military or terrorist attack that is imminent or ongoing) presenting a danger to a significant civilian population, requiring specific protective action (such as evacuation or sheltering in place).
- **Civil emergency message** **CEM** – A message intended to warn the public of an in-progress or imminent significant threat(s) to public safety and/or property. Although the hazard that warrants such a message to be issued is less specific than that meriting a Civil Danger Warning (and, to a lesser extent, a Local Area Emergency), it is given higher priority than a Local Area Emergency.
- **Demonstration Message** **DMO** – A demonstration or test message used for particular purposes in established state, local, tribal or territorial EAS plans. Purposes may include testing of a siren system, audio quality checks or alert origination system and pathway demonstration.
- **Earthquake warning** **EQW** – Indicates earthquake activity is ongoing or imminent.
- **Evacuation immediate** **EVI** – Warns the public that immediate evacuation for a long-duration emergency event (such as for an approaching tropical cyclone, a wildfire or the release of flammable or explosive gas) has been recommended or ordered by state and/or local law enforcement.
- **Hazardous materials warning** **HMW** – Warns the public of the release of non-radioactive hazardous material (such as a flammable gas, toxic chemical, or biological agent) that may necessitate recommendations of evacuation (for an explosion, fire or oil spill hazard) or sheltering in place (for a toxic fume hazard).
- **Law enforcement warning** **LEW** – Issued by authorized law enforcement agencies to warn the public of a bomb explosion, riot, or other criminal event (e.g., a jailbreak) that may result in the blockade roads, waterways, or facilities, the evacuation or denial of access to affected areas, and the arrest of violators or suspicious persons.
- **Local area emergency** **LAE** – An emergency message that defines an event of insignificant threat to public safety and/or property, which could escalate, contribute to more serious events, or disrupt critical public safety services (such as a disruption in water, electric or natural gas service, snowfall-induced road closures, or a potential terrorism threat).
- **Nuclear power plant warning** **NUW** – Warns of a hazardous materials event at a nuclear power plant classified as a Site Area Emergency (a hazardous event confined to the plant site) or General Emergency (an event affecting a less than 10-mile [16 km] radius around the plant) under Nuclear Regulatory Commission (NRC) guidelines. Authorized officials may recommend evacuation or medical treatment of exposed persons in nearby areas.
- **Radiological hazard warning** **RHW** – Indicates the loss, discovery, theft or release of a radiological hazard.
- **Shelter in place warning** **SPW** – Indicates an event (such as the release of hazardous materials containing toxic fumes or radioactivity harmful to residents in the warning area) in which the public is recommended to shelter in place and take necessary safety precautions.
- **Tsunami watch** **TSA** – A tsunami is forecast to impact the specified area.
- **Tsunami warning** **TSW** – A tsunami with the potential of causing widespread coastal flooding accompanied by powerful currents and inundation and/or significant damage to adjacent property is imminent, expected or occurring and may continue for several hours after the wave's initial arrival, issued by the National Tsunami Warning Center.
- **Tsunami advisory** **TSW** – A tsunami with the potential to generate strong currents or waves dangerous to those in or very near the water is imminent, expected, or occurring. The threat may continue for several hours after initial arrival, but significant inundation of land and adjacent property is not expected.
- **Volcano warning** **VOW** – Indicates volcanic activity that is ongoing or imminent.

== Wind and tropical cyclones ==
Wind alerting is classified into groups of two Beaufort numbers, beginning at 6–7 for the lowest class of wind advisories. The last group includes three Beaufort numbers, 14–16. The actual alerts can be categorized into three classes: maritime wind warnings, land wind warnings, and tropical cyclone warnings. Advisory-force and gale-force winds will not trigger a separate wind advisory or warning if a Blizzard warning is already in effect. However, as seen with Hurricane Sandy, if widespread high wind warnings are in effect prior to the issuance of a blizzard warning, the high wind warnings may be continued.

=== Wind alert terms and signals ===
Wind speed	Marine or beach hazard warning	Land warning	Tropical cyclone warning(s)	Flags	Lights	Beaufort force
25 to 38 mph (22 to 33 knots)	Small craft advisory	Wind advisory	Wind advisory or small craft advisory			6–7
39 to 54 mph (34 to 47 knots)	Gale warning	High wind warning	Tropical storm warning*			8–9
55 to 73 mph (48 to 63 knots)	Storm warning	High wind warning	Tropical storm warning†			10–11
74–110 mph (64 to 99 knots)	Hurricane force wind warning	High wind warning	Hurricane warning			12–13
Over 110 mph (100+ knots)	Hurricane force wind warning	Extreme wind warning	Major hurricane warning‡			14–16

* Tropical Storm Warning flags and lights will always be displayed the same as Storm Warning flags and lights.
† A tropical storm with winds in this range is sometimes referred to as a "severe tropical storm".
‡ The Extreme Wind Warning is issued shortly before the eyewall makes landfall.

== Hazardous weather risks ==
The various weather conditions described above have different levels of risk. The National Weather Service uses a multi-tier system of weather statements to notify the public of threatening weather conditions. These statements are used in conjunction with specific weather phenomena to convey different levels of risk. In order of increasing risk, these statements are:

- Outlook – Outlooks are issued to provide contextual forecasts of potential hazardous weather events:
  - A Hazardous Weather Outlook HWO is issued daily to outline hazardous weather or hydrologic events that may occur in the next seven days within each Weather Forecast Office’s area of responsibility. Each segment of the product will contain sections outlining hazardous weather in the short term (through Day 1) and long term (for Days 2-7), and spotter activation information. The outlook will include information about any potential hazards to life, property or travel (severe or strong thunderstorms, heavy rain or flooding, winter weather, tropical cyclones, extremes of heat or cold, and/or fire weather conditions) that may take place over the next seven days with an emphasis on the first 24 hours of the forecast. It is intended to provide information to those who need considerable lead time to prepare for the event (such as emergency management agencies, Skywarn spotters and media outlets). If issued for a coastal area, the outlook will contain two segments: one for the marine zones and adjacent land-based (i.e., coastal) zones, and the other for the remainder of the land-based zones. In August 2021, the Graphical Hazardous Weather Outlook (GHWO)—originally known as the Enhanced Hazardous Weather Outlook (EHWO)—was introduced as an experimental product, providing color-coded graphical depictions of potential weather hazards within each WFO’s area of responsibility over the seven-day forecast period, compiled utilizing data collected from the Storm Prediction Center and the Weather Prediction Center; beginning with its elimination by the Eureka, California and Corpus Christi, Texas offices in August 2023, NWS Forecast Offices will gradually discontinue the text-based Hazardous Weather Outlook product in favor of utilizing the GHWO to outline weather hazards within each forecast area and the Area Forecast Discussion product to convey regionally specific hazard information.
  - A Hydrologic Outlook ESF is issued daily solely to outline possible hydrologic events occurring in the next seven days within each WFO’s area of responsibility. The outlook, which follows a similar structure to the Hazardous Weather Outlook, will include information on an as-needed basis about potential flooding more than 24 hours from the event and long-term forecast information (such as water supply forecasts and probabilistic analyses).
  - A Short-Term Forecast NOW (alt., NOWcast) is an event-driven narrative outlook of near-term weather conditions within the Weather Forecast Office’s area of responsibility, typically valid for a three- to seven-hour period. The product outlines any ongoing or recently occurring conditions—based on radar analysis, satellite imagery and other forms of remote observation—that provide a basis for, or an enhancement to, the forecast. During severe weather events, the product can be used to describe the progress of severe weather and/or rainfall capable of producing flash flooding.
  - Mesoscale discussions (MDs) are event-driven narrative outlooks of near-term severe weather and hydrological conditions over the continental United States, typically valid for a one- to seven-hour period, usually preceding the onset of an event. The Storm Prediction Center issues Mesoscale Convective Discussions (MCD) to provide short-term analysis highlighting the development and/or evolution of potential or ongoing severe thunderstorm and hazardous winter weather activity. In severe weather situations, discussions illustrate forecaster reasoning for whether a watch is warranted (based on probabilities ranging from 5% to 95%), to provide analysis of ongoing convection (often to update information on ongoing watches and sometimes to provide reasoning for a watch cancellation), or are used as advance notice of a categorical upgrade in a forthcoming convective outlook update. Meso-gamma mesoscale discussions are occasionally issued by the SPC to provide targeted mesoanalysis when there is high confidence that a high-impact severe weather event containing strong tornadoes (EF2+) or extreme damaging winds (greater than 100 mph (160 km/h)) will occur. During winter weather events, they provide analysis of expected heavier rates of winter precipitation over a specific time span or elevation, short-term blizzard conditions; or climatologically anomalous or unexpected events below defined criteria. The Weather Prediction Center issues mesoscale precipitation discussions (MPDs) as flash flood guidance for National Weather Service forecast offices, NWS River Forecast Centers, the media, emergency managers and other users, containing technical discussions concerning forecasted heavy rainfall events and expected impacts relating to potential flooding.
- Advisory – An advisory is issued when a hazardous weather or hydrologic event is occurring, imminent, or likely. Advisories are for "less serious" conditions than warnings that may cause significant inconvenience, and if caution is not exercised could lead to situations that may threaten life or property. The National Weather Service may activate weather spotters in areas affected by advisories to help them better track and analyze the event.
- Emergency – An Emergency is issued when an event that by itself cannot pose a threat to life or property, but may indirectly cause other events to happen that may pose a threat to life or property. An example of this would be a power outage, which although not directly posing a hazard, may threaten public safety and critical services. The only existing exceptions to this are the tornado emergency and flash flood emergency, which are issued to get the attention of the public to a major tornado or flash flood.
- Watch – A watch is used when the risk of a hazardous weather or hydrologic event has increased significantly, but its occurrence, location, or timing is still uncertain. It is intended to provide enough lead time so those who need to set their plans in motion can do so. A watch means that hazardous weather is possible. People should have a plan of action in case a storm threatens and they should listen for later information and possible warnings especially when planning travel or outdoor activities. The National Weather Service may activate weather spotters in areas affected by watches to help them better track and analyze the event.
- Warning – A warning is issued when a hazardous weather or hydrologic event is occurring, imminent, or likely. A warning means weather conditions pose a threat to life or property. People in the path of the storm need to take protective action. The National Weather Service may activate weather spotters in areas affected by warnings to help them better track and analyze the event.
- Statement – A statement is either issued as a follow-up message to a warning, watch, or emergency, that may update, extend, or cancel the message it is following up or a notification of significant weather for which no type of advisory, watch, or warning exists.

=== Convective outlook categories ===
The Storm Prediction Center (SPC) issues Day 1, Day 2, and Day 3 Convective Outlooks depicting forecast areas of general (non-severe) and severe thunderstorm threats across the contiguous United States, along with a text narrative discussion consisting of a plain-language summary of the threat type(s) and timing focused on areas of highest risk, and a technical discussion written in scientific language that usually includes a synoptic overview of convective patterns as well as, if necessary, a geographically specific narrative of meteorological reasoning and justification for the type of coverage and intensity applicable to the severe thunderstorm threat.

The categorical forecast in the Day 1-3 Convective Outlooks—which estimates a severe weather event occurring within 25 miles (40 km) of a point—specifies the level of overall severe thunderstorm risk via numbers, descriptive labeling, and colors as follows:

Convective thunderstorm risk categories
Risk category	Map code	Description
General or non-severe thunderstorms	TSTM	Delineates, to the right of a line, where a 10% or greater probability of thunderstorms is forecast during the valid period. While severe weather is not anticipated, thunderstorms occurring in areas under general risk can occasionally reach severe intensity.
Marginal	1-MRGL	An area of severe storms of either limited organization and longevity, or very low coverage and marginal intensity.
Slight	2-SLGT	An area of organized severe storms, which is not widespread in coverage with varying levels of intensity.
Enhanced	3-ENH	An area of greater (relative to slight risk) severe storm coverage with varying levels of intensity.
Moderate	4-MDT	An area where widespread severe weather with several tornadoes and/or numerous severe thunderstorms is likely, some of which should be intense. This risk is usually reserved for days with several supercells producing intense tornadoes and/or very large hail, or an intense squall line with widespread damaging winds.
High	5-HIGH	An area where a severe weather outbreak is expected from either numerous intense and long-tracked tornadoes or a long-lived derecho-producing thunderstorm complex that produces hurricane-force wind gusts and widespread damage. This risk is reserved for when high confidence exists in widespread coverage of severe weather with embedded instances of extreme severe (i.e., violent tornadoes or very damaging convective wind events).

The attendant risk areas are derived from probability forecasts of tornadoes, damaging winds, and large hail occurring within 25 miles of any point during each day of the outlook period. For the Day 1 and Day 2 Convective Outlooks, the risk areas are determined by the probability of any individual severe weather hazard, ranging from 2% to 60%, derived from odds greater than the statistical average that any one location may be impacted by severe weather hazards. (For example, a 15% tornado probability indicates 15 times the average odds that a tornado will be reported within 25 miles of a point.) Probabilities for severe-criteria wind and hail are typically assigned higher numbers than for tornadoes, since there is a greater likelihood of occurrence in comparison.

Because of greater uncertainty about the likelihood and severity of thunderstorm hazards beyond the short-term, the Day 3 and Day 4-8 Convective Outlooks assesses the percentile probability of all severe thunderstorm hazards combined during those periods at general likelihoods (15%, 30% and 45% for Day 3, and 15% and 30% for Days 4-8).

A demarcated "hatched" area, represented as a black outline with diagonal dashes contained within the contour, is overlaid with the severe probabilities if there is a 10% or greater probability for significant severe events—tornadoes rated EF2 or greater, thunderstorm wind gusts of hurricane force (74 miles per hour (119 km/h)) or higher, or hailstones 2 inches (5.1 cm) in diameter or larger—within 25 miles of a point on any outlook day.

Categorical outlook conversion
Day 1 and Day 2 probability to categorical outlook conversion
Outlook probability	TORN	WIND	HAIL
2%	MRGL	not used	not used
5%	SLGT	MRGL	MRGL
10%	ENH	not used	not used
10% Sig. Severe	ENH	not used	not used
15%	ENH	SLGT	SLGT
15% Sig. Severe	MDT	SLGT	SLGT
30%	MDT	ENH	ENH
30% Sig. Severe	HIGH	ENH	ENH
45%	HIGH	ENH	ENH
45% Sig. Severe	HIGH	MDT	MDT
60%	HIGH	MDT	MDT
60% Sig. Severe	HIGH	HIGH	MDT
Day 3 probability to categorical outlook conversion
Outlook probability	Combined TORN, WIND, and HAIL		
5%	MRGL (Note: Because of the tornado-driven nature of landfalling tropical cyclone events, the Day 3 outlook allows for a 5% overall severe probability to be designated as a slight risk.)		
15%	SLGT		
15% Sig. Severe	SLGT		
30%	ENH		
30% Sig. Severe	ENH		
45%	ENH		
45% Sig. Severe	MDT		
Day 4–8 probability to categorical outlook conversion
Outlook probability	Combined TORN, WIND, and HAIL		
< 15%	No Area		
15%	Severe (15%)		
30%	Severe (30%)		

On March 3, 2026, the SPC implemented changes to the Severe Weather Outlook products, incorporating Conditional Intensity Group (CIG) forecasts of significant severe weather for Days 1–3, replacing the “SIGN” labeling previously used for higher-end severe events. The three intensity categories (CIG1, CIG2, and CIG3) are intended to communicate increasing intensity of significant severe hazards (including strong/violent tornadoes, large hail and extreme straight-line winds).

Under this system, the existing SPC significant severe hazard grids for tornado, wind, hail and total severe will continue to be disseminated, with additional probability thresholds for discrete severe thunderstorms being added to the existing 10% significant severe threshold, represented as a sequence of even numbers (e.g., 2%, 4%), and unconditional probabilities of significant severe hazards based on potential tornado intensity, maximum hail size and maximum wind speeds. The maximum threshold for the Day 1 and Day 2 probabilistic severe wind forecasts will also be increased with the introduction of two additional probability categories (75% and 90%).

Categorical outlook and Conditional Intensity Group conversion
Tornado probability to categorical outlook/CIG conversion (Days 1–2)
Outlook probability	<CIG1	CIG1	CIG2	CIG3
2%	MRGL	MRGL	SLGT	not used
5%	SLGT	SLGT	ENH	not used
10%	SLGT	ENH	ENH	ENH
15%	ENH	ENH	MDT	MDT
30%	ENH	MDT	HIGH	HIGH
45%	ENH	MDT	HIGH	HIGH
60%	ENH	HIGH	HIGH	HIGH
Wind probability to categorical outlook/CIG conversion (Days 1–2)
Outlook probability	<CIG1	CIG1	CIG2	CIG3
5%	MRGL	MRGL	SLGT	not used
15%	SLGT	SLGT	ENH	not used
30%	SLGT	ENH	ENH	not used
45%	ENH	ENH	MDT	HIGH
60%	ENH	MDT	HIGH	HIGH
75%	ENH	MDT	HIGH	HIGH
90%	ENH	MDT	HIGH	HIGH
Hail probability to categorical outlook/CIG conversion (Days 1–2)
Outlook probability	<CIG1	CIG1	CIG2	
5%	MRGL	MRGL	SLGT	
15%	SLGT	SLGT	ENH	
30%	SLGT	ENH	ENH	
45%	ENH	ENH	MDT	
60%	ENH	MDT	MDT	
Total severe probability to categorical outlook/CIG conversion (Day 3)
Outlook probability	<CIG1	CIG1	CIG2	
5%	MRGL	MRGL	SLGT	
15%	SLGT	SLGT	ENH	
30%	SLGT	ENH	ENH	
45%	ENH	ENH	MDT	
60%	ENH	MDT	MDT	

CIG intensity levels, identified in graphical outlooks under a revised 10% significant severe "hatched" demarcation structure applied to each level, indicate the atmospheric environment supports the formation of the following severe phenomena:

Conditional Intensity Groups
CIG level	Graphical outlook representation	Potential severe weather parameters
<CIG1	No demarcation	Environment is capable of supporting the development of tornadoes (mainly of EF0–EF1 intensity), straight-line wind gusts under 74 mph, and/or hail under two inches in diameter.
CIG1	Right-aligned diagonal dashes	Environment is capable of supporting the development of strong tornadoes of at least EF2 intensity, straight-line wind gusts to 74 mph or stronger, and/or hail two inches in diameter or larger.
CIG2	Left-aligned diagonal lines	Environment is capable of supporting the development of strong to violent tornadoes of EF3 intensity or stronger, straight-line winds of 85 mph or stronger (produced through organized linear bow echoes or derechos) capable of widespread wind damage, or destructive hail 3.5 inches in diameter or larger.
CIG3	Cross-hatch pattern	Environment is capable of supporting the development of violent tornadoes of at least EF4 intensity or a high-end (usually ongoing) derecho event producing straight-line wind gusts above 95 mph.

=== Warning impact statements ===
Many of the National Weather Service's Weather Forecast Offices—primarily those located within the Central and Southern Region Headquarters—use a multi-tier impact-based warning (IBW) system of impact statements to notify the public and emergency management officials of the severity of specific severe weather phenomena. The impact statement system—initially used only for tornado and severe thunderstorm warnings—was first employed by the WFOs in Wichita and Topeka, Kansas, and Springfield, St. Louis and Kansas City/Pleasant Hill, Missouri beginning with the 2012 Spring severe weather season, eventually expanded to include 33 additional National Weather Service Weather Forecast Offices within the Central Region Headquarters in 2013, and then to eight additional offices within the Eastern, Southern and Western Regions in the spring of 2014. Since July 28, 2021 (or as late as August 2 in certain County Warning Areas), the NWS has incorporated categorical “CONSIDERABLE” and “DESTRUCTIVE" damage threat indicators (similar to those incorporated into tornado warning products since the implementation of the Impact Based Warning system) at the bottom of the product text of certain severe thunderstorm warnings and related Severe Weather Statements to indicate higher-end hail and/or wind events caused by the parent storm cell.

Under this system, the warning product will include text denoting the specific hazard (i.e., 60 mph wind gusts and quarter size hail) and applicable sourcing (either via indication from Doppler weather radar, or visual confirmation from storm spotters or other emergency management officials) and the level of impact to life and/or property. In order of increasing risk by warning type, these statements—which may be modified at the discretion of the regional forecast office—are:

Tornado Warning
Tornado impact attribute	Impact statement(s) (in sentence order, where applicable)
Landspout / weak tornado	Expect damage to mobile homes, roofs, and vehicles.; Alternate wording: Expect damage to mobile homes, roofs, screen enclosures, carports, vehicles and trees along the path of the tornado.; (For landspouts and weak tornadoes, alternative impact statements may be utilized at the discretion of the Weather Forecast Office; all other statements are standard nationwide.)
"Base" (default)	Flying debris will be dangerous to those caught without shelter.; Mobile homes will be damaged or destroyed.; Damage to roofs, windows and vehicles will occur.; Tree damage is likely.
Considerable (accompanies wording for a PDS Tornado Warning)	You are in a life-threatening situation.; Flying debris may be deadly to those caught without shelter.; Mobile homes will be destroyed.; Considerable damage to homes, businesses, and vehicles is likely and complete destruction is possible.
Catastrophic (accompanies wording for a Tornado Emergency)	You are in a life-threatening situation.; Flying debris may be deadly to those caught without shelter.; Mobile homes will be destroyed.; Considerable damage to homes, businesses, and vehicles is likely and complete destruction is possible.
Severe Thunderstorm Warning
Thunderstorm attribute	Impact statement(s) (in sentence order, where applicable)
Wind (60 mph)	1) Expect damage to roofs, siding, and trees.; Alternate wording: 1) Tree and power line damage is likely.; 2) Expect damage to some roofs, siding, carports, and fences.; (This alternate damage impact statement should include both aforementioned statements.)
Wind (70 mph) (classified as "Considerable")	1) Expect considerable tree damage.; 2) Damage is likely to mobile homes, roofs, and outbuildings.; Alternate wording: 1) Expect considerable tree and power line damage.; 2) Damage is likely to mobile homes, roofs, screen enclosures, carports, and outbuildings.
Wind (80 mph) (classified as "Destructive"; accompanies wording for a PDS Severe Thunderstorm Warning)	1) Flying debris will be dangerous to those caught without shelter.; 2) Mobile homes will be heavily damaged.; 3) Expect considerable damage to roofs, windows, and vehicles.; 4) Extensive tree damage and power outages are likely.; Alternate wording: 1) Flying debris will be dangerous to those caught without shelter.; 2) Mobile homes will likely be heavily damaged.; 3) Considerable damage to roofs, windows, and vehicles is likely.; 4) Expect considerable tree and power line damage.
Wind (90 mph) (classified as "Destructive"; accompanies wording for a PDS Severe Thunderstorm Warning)	1) You are in a life-threatening situation.; 2) Flying debris may be deadly to those caught without shelter.; 3) Mobile homes will be heavily damaged or destroyed.; 4) Homes and businesses will have substantial roof and window damage.; 5) Expect extensive tree damage and power outages.; Alternate wording: 1) You are in a life-threatening situation.; 2) Flying debris may be deadly to those caught without shelter.; 3) Mobile homes will be heavily damaged or destroyed.; 4) Homes and businesses will likely have substantial roof and window damage.; 5) Expect extensive tree damage and power line damage with widespread power outages.
Wind (100 mph+) (classified as "Destructive"; accompanies wording for a PDS Severe Thunderstorm Warning)	1) You are in a life-threatening situation.; 2) Flying debris may be deadly to those caught without shelter.; 3) Mobile homes will be destroyed.; 4) Expect considerable damage to homes and businesses.; 5) Expect extensive tree damage and power outages.; Alternate wording: 1) You are in a life-threatening situation.; 2) Flying debris may be deadly to those caught without shelter.; 3) Mobile homes will be heavily damaged or destroyed.; 4) Homes and businesses will likely have substantial roof and window damage.; 5) Expect extensive tree damage and power line damage with widespread power outages.
Hail (1.00" to 1.25")	Damage to vehicles is expected.; Alternate wording: Damage to vehicles is likely.
Hail (1.50" to 2.50") (hail sizes of 1.75" to 2.50" classified as "Considerable"	1) People and animals outdoors will be injured.; 2) Expect damage to roofs, siding, windows, and vehicles.; Alternate wording: 1) People and animals outdoors will likely be injured.; 2) Expect damage to roofs, siding, screen enclosures, windows, and vehicles.
Hail (2.75"+) (classified as "Destructive"; accompanies wording for a PDS Severe Thunderstorm Warning)	1) People and animals outdoors will be severely injured.; 2) Expect shattered windows, extensive damage to roofs, siding, and vehicles.; Alternate wording: 1) Severe injuries are likely with hail this size.; 2) Expect shattered windows, extensive damage to roofs, siding, screen enclosures, and vehicles.

== Media distribution ==
Hazardous weather forecasts and alerts are provided to the public using the NOAA Weather Radio All Hazards system and through news media such as television, radio and internet sources. Many local television stations have overlay graphics which will either show a map or a list of the affected areas. The most common NWS weather alerts to be broadcast over NOAA Weather Radio using SAME technology are described in the following table:

Common NWS weather alerts
Event name	Code	Description
Tornado watch	TOA	Also known as a red box. Conditions are favorable for the development of severe thunderstorms producing tornadoes in and close to the watch area. Watches are usually in effect for several hours, with six hours being the most common (also automatically indicates a Severe Thunderstorm Watch).
Tornado warning	TOR	A tornado is indicated by radar or sighted by storm spotters. The warning will include where the tornado is and what locations will be in its path (also automatically indicates a Severe Thunderstorm Warning).
Severe thunderstorm watch	SVA	Also known as a yellow box or blue box. Conditions are favorable for the development of severe thunderstorms in and close to the watch area. Watches are usually in effect for several hours, with six hours being the most common.
Severe thunderstorm warning	SVR	Issued when a thunderstorm produces hail 1 inch (25 mm) or larger in diameter and/or winds which equal or exceed 58 miles per hour (93 km/h). Severe thunderstorms can result in the loss of life and/or property. Information in this warning includes: where the storm is, what locations will be affected, and the primary threat(s) associated with the storm. Tornadoes can also and do develop in severe thunderstorms without the issuance of a tornado warning.
Severe weather statement	SVS	Issued when the forecaster wants to follow up a warning with important information on the progress of severe weather elements.
Special marine warning	SMW	Issued when a thunderstorm over water produces hail 1 inch (25 mm) or larger in diameter, causes winds which equal or exceed 39 miles per hour (63 km/h), or is capable of producing or currently producing a waterspout. Information in this warning includes: where the storm is, what waters will be affected, and the primary threat associated with the storm.
Flood watch	FLA	Issued as either a Flood Watch or a River Flood Watch. Indicates that flooding is possible in and close to the watch area. Those in the affected area are urged to be ready to take action if a flood warning is issued or flooding is observed.
Flood warning	FLW	Issued as either a Flood Warning or a River Flood Warning. Indicates that flooding is imminent or occurring in the warned area.
Flash flood watch	FFA	Also known as a green box. Indicates that flash flooding is possible in and close to the watch area. Those in the affected area are urged to be ready to take quick action if a flash flood warning is issued or flooding is observed.
Flash flood warning	FFW	Signifies a dangerous situation where rapid flooding of small rivers, streams, creaks, or urban areas are imminent or already occurring. Very heavy rain that falls in a short time period can lead to flash flooding, depending on local terrain, ground cover, degree of urbanization, degree of man-made changes to river banks, and initial ground or river conditions.
Blizzard watch	BZA	An announcement for specific areas that blizzard conditions are possible.
Blizzard warning	BZW	A warning that sustained winds or frequent gusts of 30 kn (35 mph or 56 km/h) or higher and considerable falling and/or blowing snow reducing visibilities to 1/4 mile (0.40 km) or less are expected in a specified area. A blizzard warning can remain in effect when snowfall ends but a combination of strong winds and blowing snow continue, even though the winter storm itself may have exited the region (also automatically indicates a Winter Storm Warning for Heavy Snow and Blowing Snow).
Tropical storm watch	TRA	An announcement for specific areas that tropical storm conditions are possible within 48 hours.
Tropical storm warning	TRW	A warning that sustained winds within the range of 34 to 63 kn (39 to 73 mph or 63 to 117 km/h) associated with a tropical cyclone are expected in a specified area within 36 hours or less.
Hurricane watch	HUA	An announcement for specific areas that hurricane conditions are possible, and tropical storm conditions are possible within 48 hours.
Hurricane warning	HUW	A warning that sustained winds 64 kn (74 mph or 118 km/h) or higher associated with a hurricane are expected, and tropical storm conditions are expected within 36 hours in a specified area. A hurricane warning can remain in effect when dangerously high water or a combination of dangerously high water and exceptionally high waves continue, even though winds may be less than hurricane force (also automatically indicates a Tropical Storm Warning).

== Related weather scales as defined by the NWS ==
The NWS uses several scales in describing weather events or conditions. Several common scales are described below.

=== Hail diameter sizes ===
The size of individual hailstones that reach surface level is determined by speed of the updraft which create the individual ice crystals at atmospheric levels. Larger hailstones are capable of producing damage to property, and particularly with very large hailstones, resulting in serious injury or death due to blunt-force trauma induced by the impact of the hailstones. Hailstone size is typically correspondent to the size of an object for comparative purposes.

Hailstone size	Measurement (in)	Measurement (cm)	Updraft speed (mph)	Updraft speed (m/s)
pea	0.25	0.6	40	18
penny	0.75	1.9	44	20
quarter*	1.00	2.5	49	22
half dollar	1.25	3.2	54	24
ping pong ball	1.50	3.8	60	27
golf ball	1.75	4.4	64	29
hen egg†	2.00	5.1	69	31
tennis ball	2.50	6.4	77	34
baseball	2.75	7.0	81	36
tea cup	3	7.6	84	38
softball	4	10.1	98	44
grapefruit	4.50	11.4	103	46
computer CD/DVD	4.75	12.1	N/A	N/A

* Begins hail sizes within the severe hail criterion.
† Begins hail sizes within the Storm Prediction Center's significant severe criterion.

=== Beaufort wind scale ===
The Beaufort scale is an empirical measure that correlates wind speed to observed conditions at sea or on land.

Wind category	Beaufort number	Wind speed	Conditions
Advisory-force	6	25–31 mph (40–50 km/h)	Large branches in motion; whistling in telephone wires.
Advisory-force	7	32–38 mph (51–62 km/h)	Whole trees in motion; inconvenience felt walking against wind.
Gale-force	8–9	39–54 mph (63–88 km/h)	Twigs break off trees; wind generally impedes progress. Tropical storm criteria begin.
Storm-force	10–11	55–73 mph (89–117 km/h)	Damage to chimneys and television antennas; pushes over shallow-rooted trees. Severe thunderstorm criteria begin (58 mph (93 km/h)).
Hurricane-force	12–13^{†}	74–112 mph (118–181 km/h)	Peels shingles off roofs; windows broken if struck by debris; trees uprooted or snapped; mobile homes severely damaged or overturned; moving cars pushed off-road. Hurricane criteria begin.
Major hurricane-force Extreme wind	14–16^{†}	113–237 mph (182–381 km/h)	Roofs torn off houses; cars lifted off ground; trees defoliated and sometimes debarked. Major hurricane criteria begin.

^{†}:Beaufort levels above 12 are non-standard in the United States. Instead, the Saffir–Simpson hurricane scale (Category 1, Category 2, etc.) is used.

=== Enhanced Fujita tornado intensity scale ===
The Enhanced Fujita scale, an updated version of the original Fujita scale that was developed by Ted Fujita with Allen Pearson, assigns a numerical rating from EF0 to EF5 to rate the damage intensity of tornadoes. EF0 and EF1 tornadoes are considered "weak" tornadoes, EF2 and EF3 are classified as "strong" tornadoes, with winds of at least major hurricane force, where EF4 and EF5 are categorized as "violent" tornadoes, with winds corresponding to category 5 hurricane winds and rising to match or exceed the strongest tropical cyclones on record. The EF scale is based on tornado damage (primarily to buildings), which makes it difficult to rate tornadoes that strike in sparsely populated areas, where few man-made structures are found. The Enhanced Fujita scale went into effect on February 1, 2007.

EF number	Wind speed	Comparable hurricane winds	Damage	Examples
EFU	N/A	N/A	No surveyable damage. Intensity cannot be determined due to a lack of information. This rating applies to tornadoes that traverse areas where no structures or trees were impacted to allow a damage indicator to be assigned, cause damage in an area that cannot be accessed by a survey, or cause damage that cannot be differentiated from that of another tornado.	N/A
EF0	65–85 mph (105–137 km/h)	Severe tropical storm – Category 1	Light damage. Peels surface off some roofs; some damage to gutters or siding; branches broken off trees; shallow-rooted trees pushed over.	Philadelphia (1999); Jacksonville (2004); St. Louis (2007); Windsor, Ontario (2009); Minneapolis (2009)
EF1	86–110 (138–178 km/h)	Category 1–2	Moderate damage. Roofs severely stripped; mobile homes overturned or badly damaged; loss of exterior doors; windows and other glass broken.	Houston, (1992), Miami (1997), Bronx, New York (2010); Brooklyn and Queens, New York (2010); Minneapolis (2011)
EF2	111–135 (179–218 km/h)	Category 3	Significant damage. Roofs torn off well-constructed houses; foundations of frame homes shifted; mobile homes completely destroyed; large trees snapped or uprooted; light-object missiles generated; cars lifted off ground.	Salt Lake City (1999); Brooklyn (2007); Atlanta (2008); Vaughan, Ontario (2009); Mobile (2012); Tallahassee (2024)
EF3	136–165 (219–266 km/h)	Category 4–5	Severe damage. Entire stories of well-constructed houses destroyed; severe damage to large buildings such as shopping malls; trains overturned; trees debarked; heavy cars lifted off the ground and thrown; structures with weak foundations blown away some distance.	St. Louis (1871); Miami (1925); Pine Lake, Alberta (2000); Raleigh, North Carolina (2011); Springfield, Massachusetts (2011); El Reno, Oklahoma (2013); Nashville, Tennessee (2020); Andover, Kansas (2022)
EF4	166–200 (267–322 km/h)	Strong category 5	Extreme damage. Well-constructed houses and whole frame houses completely leveled; cars thrown and small missiles generated.	St. Louis (1896); Regina, Saskatchewan (1912); Worcester (1953); Jackson (2003); Tuscaloosa and Birmingham, Alabama (2011); Mayfield (2021); Rolling Fork (2023); Greenfield (2024); Somerset-London, Kentucky (2025)
EF5	>200 (>322 km/h)	Hurricane Patricia	Catastrophic damage. Strong frame houses leveled off foundations and swept away; automobile-sized missiles fly through the air in excess of 100 m (300 ft); steel reinforced concrete structures badly damaged; high-rise buildings have significant structural deformation; incredible phenomena will occur.	Waco (1953); Birmingham (1977); Moore, Oklahoma (1999); Joplin (2011); Moore, Oklahoma (2013); Enderlin, North Dakota (2025)

=== Saffir–Simpson hurricane category scale ===
The Saffir–Simpson hurricane wind scale, assigns a numerical classification of hurricanes into five categories distinguished by the intensities of their sustained winds. The scale spans from Category 1 (winds of at least 74 miles per hour (119 km/h)) to Category 5 (exceeding 156 miles per hour (251 km/h)). Unlike the Enhanced Fujita Scale, which assigns ratings for tornadoes after damage has been incurred and thoroughly assessed, categories on the Saffir-Simpson scale are assigned to most active cyclones that reach the minimum hurricane threshold, even before landfall.

Category	Sustained winds	Storm surge	Central pressure	Potential damage	Example(s)
	33–42 m/s 74–95 mph 64–82 knot 119–153 km/h	4–5 ft 1.2–1.5 m	28.94 inHg 980 mbar	No real damage to building structures. Damage primarily to unanchored mobile homes, shrubbery, and trees. Also, some coastal flooding and minor pier damage.	Jerry (1989) Ismael (1995); Danny (1997); Gaston (2004); Kate (2015)
	43–49 m/s 96–110 mph 83–95 kn 154–177 km/h	6–8 ft 1.8–2.4 m	28.50–28.91 inHg 965–979 mbar	Some roofing material, door, and window damage. Considerable damage to vegetation, mobile homes, etc. Flooding damages piers and small craft in unprotected anchorages may break their moorings.	Carol (1954) Diana (1990); Erin (1995); Marty (2003); Juan (2003)
	50–58 m/s 111–129 mph 96–113 kn 178–209 km/h	9–12 ft 2.7–3.7 m	27.91–28.47 inHg 945–964 mbar	Some structural damage to small residences and utility buildings, with a minor amount of curtainwall failures. Mobile homes are destroyed. Flooding near the coast destroys smaller structures with larger structures damaged by floating debris. Terrain may be flooded well inland.	Alma (1966) Alicia (1983); Roxanne (1995); Fran (1996); Isidore (2002); Sandy (2012)
	59–69 m/s 130–156 mph 114–135 kn 210–249 km/h	13–18 ft 4.0–5.5 m	27.17–27.88 inHg 920–944 mbar	More extensive curtainwall failures with some complete roof structure failure on small residences. Major erosion of beach areas. Terrain may be flooded well inland.	"Galveston" (1900) Hazel (1954); Iniki (1992); Iris (2001); Harvey (2017); Laura (2020); Ian (2022)
	70 m/s 157 mph 136 kn 250 km/h	19 ft 5.5 m	<27.17 inHg <920 mbar	Complete roof failure on many residences and industrial buildings. Some complete building failures with small utility buildings blown over or away. Flooding causes major damage to lower floors of all structures near the shoreline. Massive evacuation of residential areas may be required.	"Labor Day" (1935) Camille (1969); Gilbert (1988); Andrew (1992); Wilma, Katrina (2005); Irma (2017); Michael (2018) Dorian (2019) Milton (2024)

== See also ==
- Emergency Alert System
- Glossary of climate change
- Glossary of environmental science
- Glossary of meteorology
- List of climate change topics
- List of severe weather phenomena
- List of Storm Prediction Center high risk days
- Local storm report
- National Weather Service
- National Weather Service bulletin for New Orleans region, generally considered the most seriously worded NWS forecast ever issued, done so the day before Hurricane Katrina.
- NOAA Weather Radio
- Severe weather terminology (Canada)
- Severe weather terminology (Japan)
- Specific Area Message Encoding
- Storm Prediction Center
