= March 2017 North American blizzard =

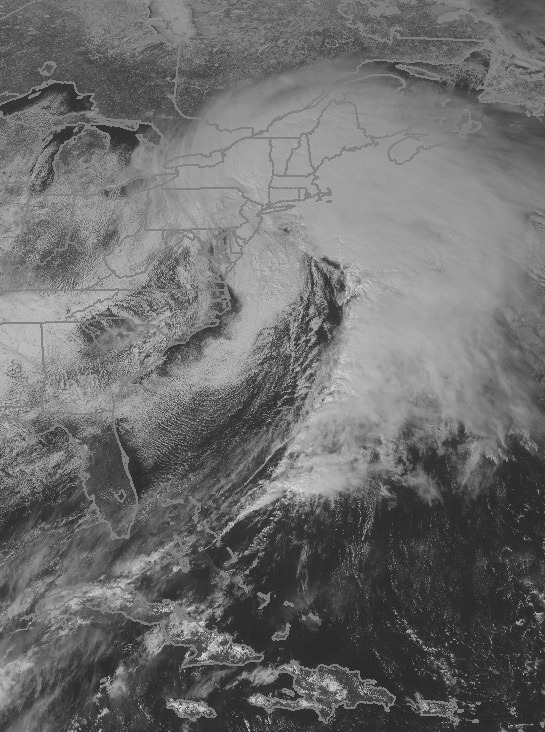
- The extratropical cyclone responsible for the blizzard near peak intensity at 18:45 UTC (2:45 p.m. EDT) on March 14, over the Eastern U.S.

Meteorological history
- Formed: March 9, 2017
- Exited land: March 16, 2017
- Dissipated: March 18, 2017

Category 4 "Crippling" blizzard
- Regional snowfall index: 10.66 (NOAA)
- Highest winds: 75 mph (120 km/h) (1-minute sustained winds)
- Highest gusts: 138 mph (222 km/h) on Mount Washington, New Hampshire
- Lowest pressure: 974 mbar (hPa); 28.76 inHg
- Max. snowfall: Snow – 58 inches (150 cm) in Bolton Valley, Vermont; Ice – 0.40 inches (10 mm) in Chesilhurst, New Jersey

Tornado outbreak
- Tornadoes: 3 on March 13
- Max. rating: EF1 tornado
- Duration: 4 hours, 3 minutes

Overall effects
- Fatalities: 16–19 total
- Areas affected: Great Plains, Upper Midwest, Ohio Valley, Northeastern United States, particularly the Mid-Atlantic states, New England), Southwestern and Atlantic Canada, and the British Isles
- Power outages: 100,000+
- Part of the 2016–17 North American winter

From March 13–15, 2017, a major late-season blizzard, unofficially referred to as Winter Storm Stella by The Weather Channel and other media, or more commonly referred to as the Blizzard of 2017, Blizzard Eugene, the Pi Day Storm, or the Pi Day Blizzard, affected the Northeastern United States, New England and Canada, dumping up to 3 feet (36 in; 91 cm) of snow in the hardest hit areas, mainly New York, Vermont, New Hampshire and southern Quebec. Forming out of an extratropical cyclone near the Northwest, the storm system dived into the northern portions of the United States, dropping light to moderate snow across the Great Lakes, Upper Midwest on March 11–12 before reaching the Ohio Valley the next day. It later coalesced into a powerful nor'easter off the East Coast, producing a swath of heavy snowfall across a large portion of the Northeast. However, it tracked closer to the coast then expected, cutting down on snow totals in some of the big cities such as New York City, which was originally expected to receive up to 12–18 inches (30–46 cm) of snow but affected more inland ones like Montreal and Sherbrooke (Canada). The nor'easter continued its way further into New England and the Maritimes throughout the day of March 15, before subsiding the next day as it moved away onto Newfoundland.

Ahead of the storm, residents prepared in advance for the major nor'easter, with blizzard warnings issued for several states, including New York, Pennsylvania, New Jersey, Connecticut, Rhode Island, and Massachusetts. Several officials had crews with salt trucks ready to deploy to clear roads. The system also disrupted travel across the country, with numerous flight cancellations at most of the major airports in the Northeast. It dropped a swath of moderate snow accumulation as it moved across the northern tier of the country, with as much as 13 inches (33 cm) reported. The storm was also responsible for ending a record streak without snowfall in Chicago, Illinois, where no snow had occurred since December 25, 2016.

== Meteorological history ==
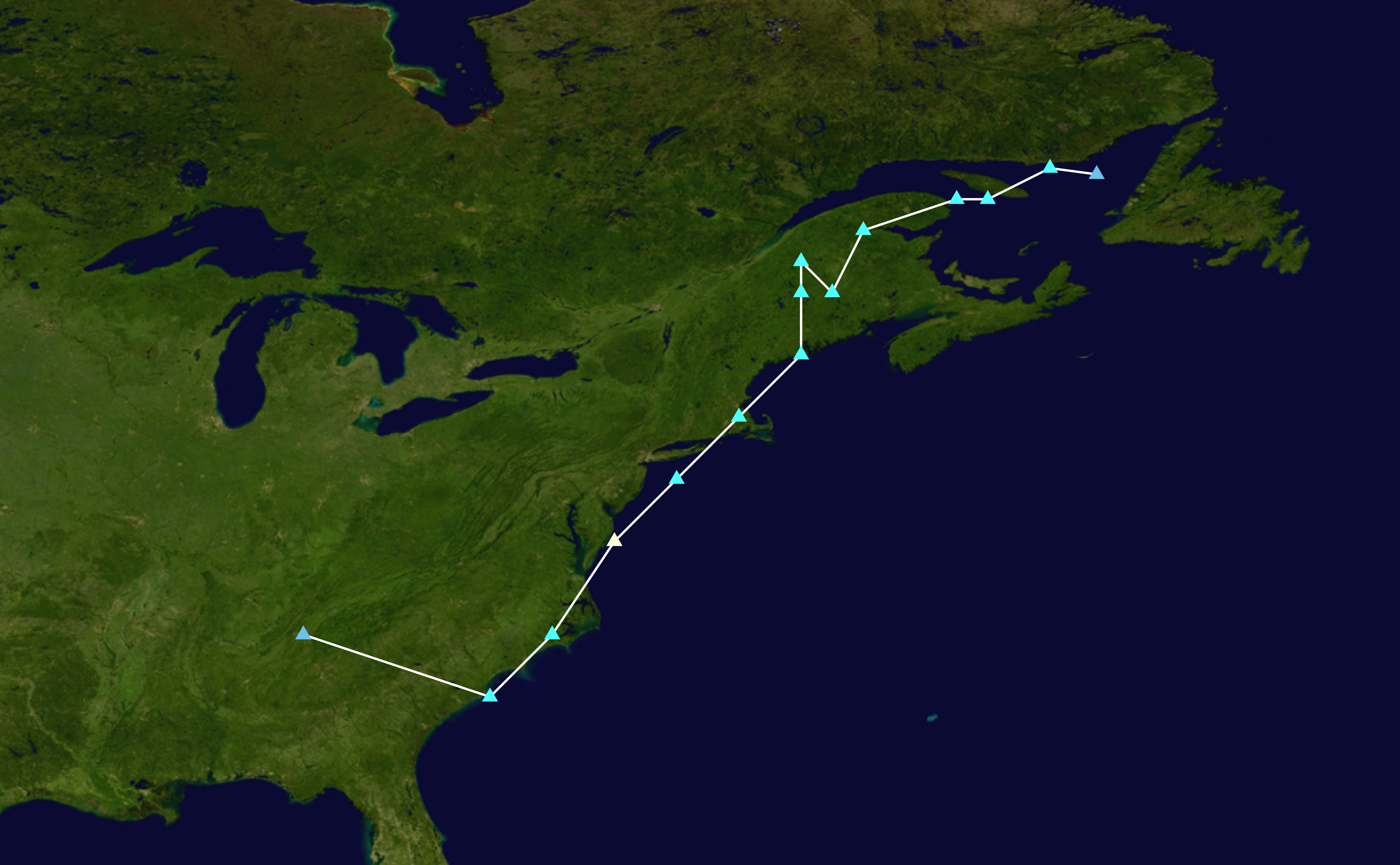
Map plotting the storm's track and intensity, according to the Saffir–Simpson scale Map key Saffir–Simpson scale Tropical depression (≤38 mph, ≤62 km/h) Tropical storm (39–73 mph, 63–118 km/h) Category 1 (74–95 mph, 119–153 km/h) Category 2 (96–110 mph, 154–177 km/h) Category 3 (111–129 mph, 178–208 km/h) Category 4 (130–156 mph, 209–251 km/h) Category 5 (≥157 mph, ≥252 km/h) Unknown Storm type Tropical cyclone Subtropical cyclone Extratropical cyclone, remnant low, tropical disturbance, or monsoon depression

On March 9, an extratropical cyclone formed in the North Pacific Ocean. On March 11, it began to affect parts of the Northwestern United States as well as British Columbia in Canada. It eventually moved ashore later that day and transferred its energy to a new surface low, which began to move southeastwards into the United States as an Alberta clipper. The system moved swiftly across the Upper Midwest throughout the day of March 12, dropping a swath of accumulating snow of 3–6 inches (7.6–15.2 cm) as frontogenesis took place. On March 13 at 15:00 UTC, the Weather Prediction Center began issuing storm summaries while the system was located west-northwest of St. Louis, Missouri. Throughout the day, a weak secondary area of low pressure formed in the Gulf of Mexico and drifted northeastwards, while not expected to fuse with the other low to its north, it helped inject moisture from the ocean over the state of Florida, which gradually began to merge with the outermost fringes of the northerly system that had now moved into the Ohio Valley.

By 21:00 UTC that night, a new surface low developed off the Georgia coastline with a central pressure of 1,010 millibars (30 inHg), eventually becoming the dominant low of the nor'easter. The storm began to rapidly deepen as it moved parallel to the East Coast of the United States, with the central pressure dropping to 986 millibars (29.1 inHg) by 15:00 UTC on March 14 while it was just off the Maryland coastline. The storm continued to intensify as it drifted northeastwards towards Long Island, continuing to produce an expansive area of snow with heavier rates embedded in snowbands across Connecticut, northern New York and most of interior New England, as well as parts of Canada. The low subsequently reached its peak intensity of 974 millibars (28.8 inHg) while just inland over Long Island. By 20:00 UTC, most of the snow had come to an end in New Jersey, Delaware, and Washington D.C., as the low began to move inland over New England; subsequently it also began to weaken as it traveled further inland, and by early on March 15, snow began to end in more parts of the region. The system continued to weaken as it moved slowly through upper New England, the system continued to weaken, consequently, the Weather Prediction Center terminated storm summaries on the winter storm as nearly most of the moderate to heavy snow had stopped in the region and switched to rain. On March 18, the low that was formerly the blizzard had moved out to sea and dissipated.

=== Forecasting controversy ===
On March 14, New York Governor Andrew Cuomo stated that the storm was not as bad as previously anticipated, due to the change over to a mix of snow and sleet, but advised residents to not let their guard down, as the storm was still predicted to cause high wind gusts and coastal flooding.

The reduction in snowfall totals was due to a shift in the storm's track to the west more towards the New Jersey coastline, which resulted in more mixed precipitation rather than snow. Initially, the National Weather Service predicted that the blizzard would leave New York City with up to 12–24 inches (30–61 cm) (rivaling it almost with the Great Blizzard of 1888), however these totals were later reduced due to the change in the system's track. Similarly, the metro area faced a similar situation a little over two years prior where New York City was predicted to receive up to 2–3 feet (24–36 in) of snow, but only received less than half of the predicted amount due to a shift in the storm's track by 50–100 miles (80–161 km).

Meteorologists at the National Weather Service were aware of the changing conditions that led to lesser snow accumulations along the coast the night prior to the expected event. In a multi-office conference, however, forecasters decided to maintain the higher-than-likely snowfall predictions "out of extreme caution." They sought to avoid sending mixed and/or incorrect messages about a dangerous storm by maintaining a steady forecast.

== Preparations ==
Weather alerts at 6:36 p.m. EST (23:36 UTC) on March 13 in advance of the winter storm around Pennsylvania and New Jersey
Blizzard warning	Winter storm warning
Storm warning	Gale warning
Small craft advisory	High wind warning
Weather alerts at 6:37 p.m. EST (23:37 UTC) on March 13 in advance of the winter storm around the Boston metro area.

=== United States ===
Amtrak made several adjustments to service on the Northeast Corridor in preparation of the storm. On the Acela Express, service was suspended between New York City and Boston and reduced between Washington, D.C. and New York City on March 14. Northeast Regional trains were placed on a modified schedule on March 14 with several trains shortened or cancelled. Keystone Service trains were placed on a severe weather schedule for March 14. Bieber Transportation Group cancelled buses to Philadelphia and New York City on March 14.

President Donald Trump postponed a meeting with Angela Merkel due to the nor'easter.

==== Mid-Atlantic ====
===== New York, New Jersey and Pennsylvania =====
On March 11, the National Weather Service issued blizzard watches for parts of the Northeast, including New York City.

Late on March 12, officials issued a hazardous travel advisory in advance of the storm, which was predicted to bring up to 18 inches (46 cm) of snow to parts of the state, including Staten Island.

The following day on March 13, New York City mayor Bill de Blasio urged the residents of the region to avoid traveling at any point due to the dangerous conditions and also allowing for sanitation crews to respond faster. The New York City Department of Sanitation said that they had nearly 700 salt spreaders across the boroughs of the state, and 1,600 plows would be dispatched to clear the roadways. New York Governor Andrew Cuomo advised everyone in a statement that "[I] encourage all New Yorkers in affected regions to plan ahead, and avoid any unnecessary travel as the storm progresses," and also said to expect disruptions to travel and transportation.

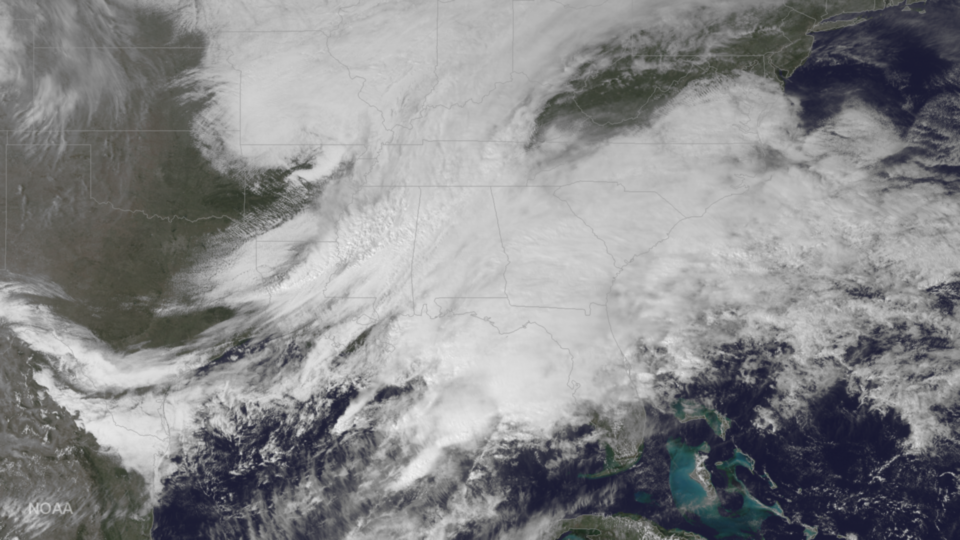
The precursor to the blizzard developing over the Southeastern United States on March 13

A state of emergency was declared in New York City on March 13, in which the above ground subway system will be shut down on March 14. LaGuardia Airport was also completely shut down. The state also declared state of emergency. The Wildlife Conservation Society closed all zoos and aquariums in New York City, and the Statue of Liberty, Ellis Island, Empire State Building, and several museums and libraries closed as well.

On March 13, a snow emergency was declared for Philadelphia, which was to go into effect later that night. 50,000 tons of salt were said to be available and salting would begin when the snow arrived. Pennsylvania Governor Tom Wolf signed a proclamation of disaster that day and stated that speeds would be restricted on most major freeways. Several businesses and attractions in Philadelphia closed on March 14 including the Philadelphia Zoo, Independence Hall National Historic Park, and the Philadelphia Museum of Art. SEPTA made changes to bus and train service in anticipation of the storm, with service on several bus routes altered or suspended and Regional Rail service running on a modified Saturday schedule on March 14. Several flights at Philadelphia International Airport on March 14 were cancelled in anticipation of the storm. The Berks Area Regional Transportation Authority and LANta cancelled all service on March 14. The United States Postal Service closed post offices and cancelled mail delivery for several locations in Pennsylvania on March 14.

Schools in North Jersey announced closures for Tuesday. A state of emergency was later declared by Governor Chris Christie, with state offices closed on March 14. New Jersey Transit suspended bus service starting at midnight on March 14 and implemented weekend schedules on commuter rail and light rail lines for March 14. PATCO Speedline announced they would be operating on a reduced snow schedule on March 14.

A radar loop of the blizzard at 10:00 a.m. EST (13:00 UTC), March 14

In Delaware, Governor John Carney issued a level one driving warning for New Castle County and DMV offices in New Castle County were closed on March 14.

===== Washington D.C, Virginia and Maryland =====
Washington, D.C., was issued a winter storm warning on March 13. MetroAccess is issued to shut down on March 14.

Virginia Governor Terry McAuliffe also declared a state of emergency late on March 13. The state of emergency was to allow state agencies to assist local governments as they respond to the storm. Roughly 4,500 pieces of equipment were ready to plow once snow totals began to exceed two inches.

A state of emergency was declared in Maryland by Governor Larry Hogan, urging people to prepare for the storm and stay off the roads.

==== New England ====
In Boston, the Massachusetts Emergency Management Agency said that they had mechanics working on loads of equipment to get ready for plowing the roads. Approximately 130 flights were cancelled as of the morning of March 13.

In advance of the nor'easter, the Connecticut Department of Transportation readied 634 trucks and 250 contractors. On March 13, Connecticut Governor Dannel Malloy issued a statewide travel ban, ordering all non-essential first and second shift employees to remain home. Prominent educational institutions, such as the University of Connecticut and Yale University, closed campuses while local districts shut down as well. The Department of Motor Vehicles cancelled all scheduled road tests. State police planned to ready additional staff leading up to the storm. Bridgeport Mayor Joe Ganim declared a snow emergency late on March 12 while Hartford officials warned city residents of a parking ban beginning at 8 p.m. EDT the following day. The city of New Haven issued a citywide travel ban effective on March 14. Airport officials at Bradley International Airport began organizing plans for snow removal in the wake of the snowstorm. The Metropolitan Transportation Authority deployed extra staff and specialized equipment, while Peter Pan Bus Lines canceled services from upstate New York to Washington D.C. Eversource Energy and The United Illuminating Company contacted city and town leaders for organization prior to the storm and assistance in its wake. All state roads were closed to everyone except for emergency vehicles. At 4 p.m. EST (21:00 UTC) nearly the whole state went into a blizzard warning, except for shoreline areas of Middlesex and New London counties.

In Rhode Island, parking bans were issued in cities statewide on March 13. Utilities crews prepared for the snow on March 14.

Some town hall meetings were canceled or postponed in New Hampshire, including Manchester, due to the storm. Schools around the southern part of the state closed on March 14.

The Maine Department of Transportation had to prepare for the storm in Eastern Maine on March 13.

=== Canada ===
Winter storm warnings were issued in the Canadian Maritimes on March 13 and for all Southern and Eastern Quebec. Because the system tracked farther inland than expected on the US East Coast, snow accumulations forecast constantly increased on March 12–13 in Ontario and Quebec.

== Impact ==
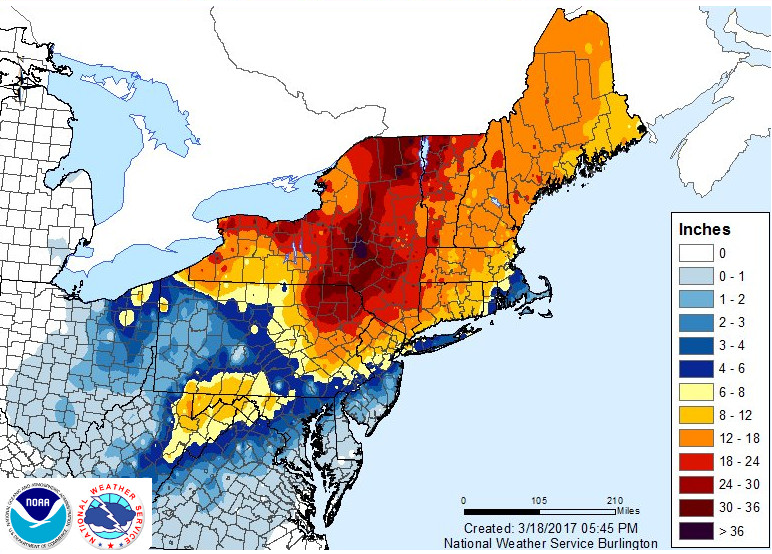
Snow total observed from March 14 to 16, 2017 in the USA

=== United States ===
==== Midwest ====
The first phase of the storm hit the Midwest on March 13, causing up to 15 inches (38 cm) of snow in some areas. Two deaths were reported in Wisconsin.

==== New England ====
Snow started falling in the early hours of March 14. West Springfield had received 3 inches of snow by 9:15 a.m. EST (12:15 UTC). Hurricane-force wind gusts of 79 mph (127 km/h) were recorded in Wellfleet, Massachusetts and of 77 mph (124 km/h) on Plum Island. Except for pockets, most of the snow dissipated in the night of March 14. Due to the wind cycle, Boston was at nearly 40 °F (4 °C) on the night of March 14.

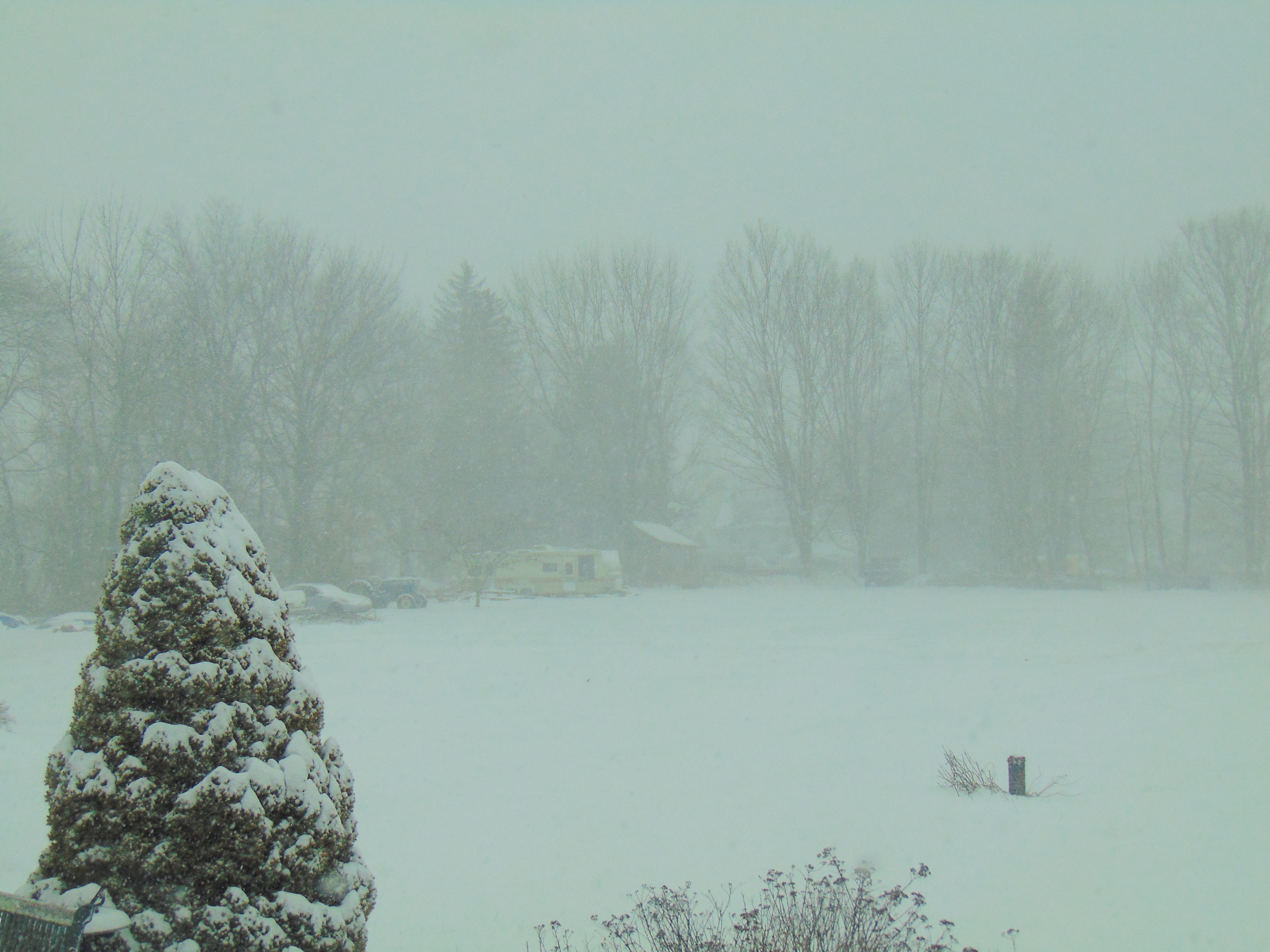
A photo of the snow in Connecticut.

Snow started in Connecticut in the early hours of March 14. Except for pockets, most of the snow dissipated in the night of March 14. A man died in East Hartford after being hit by a plow truck. Approximately 1,700 customers lost power during the storm. Some areas, including Middletown got up to 21 inches (53 cm) of snow.

Rhode Island wasn't as badly hit as other states, due to its location to the Atlantic Ocean. It toppled a wind turbine, due to winds. Snow started falling in the three states of Maine, Vermont, and New Hampshire on the morning of March 14. Maine experienced blizzard conditions in some areas. Except for pockets, the snow ended in the mid-afternoon of March 15.

Burlington, Vermont snow's lingered around for a while. The snow ended on the morning of March 15. The nor'easter produced maximum wind gusts (at elevation) of 128–138 mph (206–222 km/h) at Mount Washington, New Hampshire. The snow ended on the morning of March 15.

==== Mid-Atlantic ====
===== New York, New Jersey and Pennsylvania =====
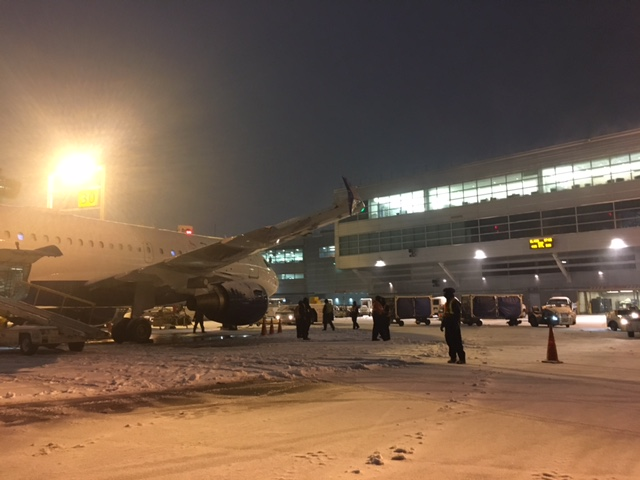
Snow at the JFK Airport after the storm

Western New York started getting hit by snow during the evening of March 13. The strongest parts of the storm on March 14 hit the Catskills area of the state. Ilion, New York saw 7 inches (18 cm) in just one hour. The blizzard warning for New York City was rescinded early in the morning. Freezing rain and sleet was common in the southern areas of the state, along with flooding. By the evening of March 15, except for small bands of snow in Central New York, the snow had ended. 3–6 deaths were reported in the state. In New York City, where snow mixed with rain, accumulation was reduced to 7.6 inches (19 cm). Accumulation was further reduced on Long Island, where most of the island saw totals under 5 inches (13 cm).

Snow started falling on the night of March 13. The snow had ended by the evening of March 14. Flooding was also caused by this storm. Atlantic City, New Jersey recorded 3.02 in (77 mm) of rain, an all time March record. Along with high winds, beach erosion was common along the southern shore. A National Hockey League game between the New Jersey Devils and Winnipeg Jets was postponed.

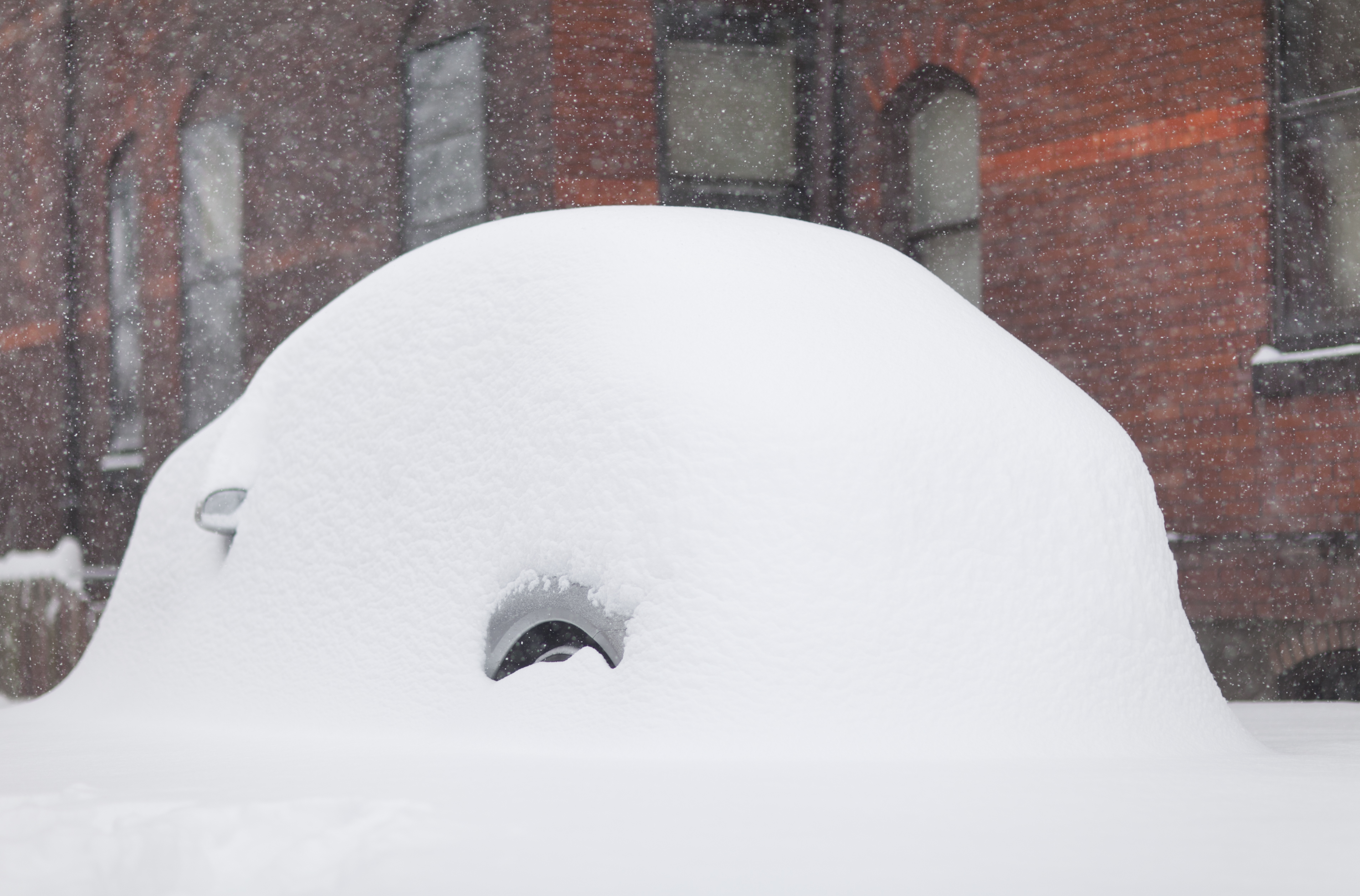
17 in (43 cm) of snow fell in Williamsport, Pennsylvania.

Snow started falling on the night of March 13. Except for small pockets, the snow ended by the early-morning of March 15. The National Guard ended bringing a sick child to the hospital during the storm. 40,000 people lost power during the storm. Three deaths have been reported from the state. Mail delivery from the United States Postal Service was suspended in many areas.

===== Maryland =====
Snow started falling on the night of March 13. It had turned into sleet by the mid-morning of March 14. It left the state by the late-afternoon of March 14.

=== Canada ===
Snow accumulations in Canada in centimètres.

==== Quebec and Ontario ====
The snow began hitting Ontario and Quebec on March 13 around noon. It rapidly intensified in the afternoon over portions of Southern Quebec and the Eastern Townships before becoming a powerful blizzard over Montreal and its South Shore, as heavy snow bands came from the South-East and did a wrap-around effect just on the South Shore of Montreal, where the snow fell at a rate of more than 7.5 cm/hr (3 in/hr) for more than 6 hours between 6PM and midnight. Environment Canada reported that a blizzard officially occurred in Montreal and Quebec City. The storm continued to track Northeast and affected Quebec City and Eastern Quebec where blizzard conditions were also occurring in the night. At the end of the blizzard, 18 cm (7 in) were recorded in Ottawa, 40 cm (16 in) in Montreal, 35 cm (14 in) in Quebec City, 55 cm (22 in) in Sherbrooke, 70 cm (28 in) in Drummondville, and more than 75 cm (30 in) in several locations such as Saint-Hubert, Vaudreuil-Dorion and Saint-Jean-sur-Richelieu.

Winds from the Northeast increased in the Saint Lawrence River between Montreal and Quebec City in the evening, producing the blizzard. Wind gusts reached 107 km/h (66 mph) at Montreal Pierre-Elliott Trudeau International Airport, 113 km/h (70 mph) at Saint-Hubert Airport on the South Shore and 140 km/h (87 mph) at Quebec International Airport. Numerous road pileups occurred, most notably on Ontario Highway 401 near Mallorytown, on Quebec highway 20 near Saint-Zotique (which caused a major fire, destroying several semis and killing one of their drivers), on highway 10 near Magog, on highway 40 near Lavaltrie and on Highway 20 near Sainte-Hélène de Bagot. Road closures included highway 15 near the USA border, highway 10 near Magog, highway 20 in Saint-Zotique and Saint-Eugène, and most notably on highway 13 on Montreal Island, where several hundreds of cars and trucks were left trapped for more than 14 hours due to communication and logistic issues complicating the evacuation.

In Quebec, many areas were left without power for more than 24 hours. In Quebec City, the Saint-Lawrence river stepped out of its riverbed, flooding both areas of Quebec City and Lévis. Five people were killed during the storm itself. At least two more (both elderly males) were found dead in Montreal in parked cars over the following days, presumably killed by heart attacks while attempting to clear them out.

==== Atlantic Canada ====
The storm started affected New Brunswick in the afternoon on March 14, with the other Atlantic Canadian provinces being hit in the early evening. The Maritime's snow ended at the night of March 15, even though Newfoundland continues to have snow.

=== Snowfall totals ===
Highest observed snow totals from each affected state
State	Town	Amount
Illinois	Colona	5.8 inches (15 cm)
Indiana	Cedar Lake	3 inches (7.6 cm)
Iowa	Ringsted	13 inches (33 cm)
Michigan	Oscoda	8 inches (20 cm)
Minnesota	Duluth	13 inches (33 cm)
North Dakota	New Town / Williston	4 inches (10 cm)
South Dakota	Watertown	10 inches (25 cm)
Wisconsin	Newburg	15.6 inches (40 cm)
Arkansas	Cave City	5 inches (13 cm)
Tennessee	Paris	4.5 inches (11 cm)
South Carolina	Pageland	3.7 inches (9.4 cm)
North Carolina	Bakersville	5.5 inches (14 cm)
Kentucky	Hebron	0.8 inches (2.0 cm)
West Virginia	Great Cacapon	12 inches (30 cm)
Virginia	Winchester	9.1 inches (23 cm)
New York	Hartwick	48.4 inches (123 cm)
Connecticut	Middletown	21 inches (53 cm)
New Jersey	Vernon	20 inches (51 cm)
Pennsylvania	Poyntelle	39.5 inches (100 cm)
Delaware	Pike Creek	4.4 inches (11 cm)
Maryland	Mountain Lake Park	12.8 inches (33 cm)
District of Columbia	National Zoo	3.1 inches (7.9 cm)
Massachusetts	Williamstown	19 inches (48 cm)
Rhode Island	Burrillville	13 inches (33 cm)
New Hampshire	Nottingham	19 inches (48 cm)
Maine	Bridgton	20.7 inches (53 cm)
Vermont	Bolton Valley	58 inches (150 cm)

Highest observed snow totals from each reported province
Province	Town	Amount
Ontario	Niagara Falls	45 centimetres (18 in)
Quebec	St-Jean-sur-Richelieu	75 centimetres (30 in)
New Brunswick	Bathurst	30 centimetres (12 in)

== Naming ==
The storm has received several different unofficial names from different media outlets. The Weather Channel, which names significant winter storms that have disruptive impacts on major cities, assigned the name Stella to the winter storm. Connecticut based WFSB dubbed the storm Blizzard Eugene. The National Weather Service has stated though that, unlike hurricanes, it does not name winter storms. The practice of winter storm naming remains controversial in the United States.

== Cold wave ==
After the storm, a burst of Arctic air swept through the United States. On March 15, record low temperatures were matched or broken in Waterloo, Iowa (−5 °F (−21 °C)), Cedar Rapids, Iowa (2 °F (−17 °C)) and Memphis, Tennessee (25 °F (−4 °C)). On March 16, records were matched or broken at Jacksonville, Florida (28 °F (−2 °C)), Melbourne, Florida (39 °F (4 °C)), Macon, Georgia (26 °F (−3 °C)), Florence, South Carolina (20 °F (−7 °C)), and Charleston, South Carolina (24 °F (−4 °C)). This freeze in the Southeast destroyed numerous crops, causing at least $1 billion in agricultural losses.

== See also ==
- List of Regional Snowfall Index Category 4 winter storms
- 1993 Storm of the Century – struck around the same time, and just as heavy
- February 2013 North American blizzard – had a very similar origin from the merger of two lows into one off the East Coast
- January 2015 North American blizzard – similar storm that had origins from an Alberta clipper, and was criticized for less snowfall totals in New York City as well when forecasts predicted much more
- December 15–17, 2020 nor'easter – nor'easter that affected similar areas with similar amounts of snow
