= Wind advisory =

Weather advisory in the United States

A wind advisory is generally issued by the National Weather Service of the United States when there are sustained non thunderstorm winds of 31–39 miles per hour (50–63 km/h) and/or gusts of 46–57 miles per hour (74–92 km/h) over land. Winds over the said cap will trigger high wind alerts rather than a wind advisory. The advisory is site specific, but winds of this magnitude occurring over an area that frequently experiences such wind speeds on a basis will not trigger a wind advisory. A slightly lower wind speed in areas around lakes may trigger a Lake wind advisory instead.

== Example ==
The following is an example of a Wind Advisory issued by the National Weather Service Office in Paducah, Kentucky on Sunday March 24, 2024.

485 
WWUS73 KPAH 241828
NPWPAH

URGENT - WEATHER MESSAGE
National Weather Service Paducah KY
128 PM CDT Sun Mar 24 2024

ILZ075>078-080>094-INZ081-082-085>088-KYZ001>022-MOZ076-086-087-
100-107>112-114-250900-
/O.NEW.KPAH.WI.Y.0005.240325T1000Z-240326T1000Z/
Jefferson-Wayne IL-Edwards-Wabash-Perry IL-Franklin-Hamilton-
White-Jackson-Williamson-Saline-Gallatin-Union-Johnson-Pope-
Hardin-Alexander-Pulaski-Massac-Gibson-Pike-Posey-Vanderburgh-
Warrick-Spencer-Fulton-Hickman-Carlisle-Ballard-McCracken-Graves-
Livingston-Marshall-Calloway-Crittenden-Lyon-Trigg-Caldwell-
Union KY-Webster-Hopkins-Christian-Henderson-Daviess-McLean-
Muhlenberg-Todd-Perry MO-Bollinger-Cape Girardeau-Wayne MO-Carter-
Ripley-Butler-Stoddard-Scott-Mississippi-New Madrid-
Including the cities of Mount Vernon, Fairfield, Albion, 
Mount Carmel, Pinckneyville, West Frankfort, McLeansboro, Carmi, 
Carbondale, Murphysboro, Herrin, Harrisburg, Shawneetown, 
Jonesboro, Vienna, Golconda, Elizabethtown, Cairo, Mound City, 
Metropolis, Fort Branch, Petersburg, Poseyville, Evansville, 
Boonville, Rockport, Hickman, Clinton, Bardwell, Wickliffe, 
Paducah, Mayfield, Smithland, Benton, Murray, Marion, Eddyville, 
Cadiz, Princeton, Morganfield, Dixon, Madisonville, Hopkinsville,
Henderson, Owensboro, Calhoun, Greenville, Elkton, Perryville, 
Marble Hill, Cape Girardeau, Jackson, Piedmont, Van Buren, 
Doniphan, Poplar Bluff, Bloomfield, Sikeston, Charleston, 
and New Madrid
128 PM CDT Sun Mar 24 2024 /228 PM EDT Sun Mar 24 2024/

...WIND ADVISORY IN EFFECT FROM 5 AM CDT /6 AM EDT/ MONDAY TO
5 AM CDT /6 AM EDT/ TUESDAY...

* WHAT...South winds 20 to 30 mph with gusts up to 50 mph 
  expected.

* WHERE...All of southern Illinois, southwest Indiana, western 
  Kentucky, and southeast Missouri.

* WHEN...From 5 AM CDT /6 AM EDT/ Monday to 5 AM CDT /6 AM EDT/ 
  Tuesday.

* IMPACTS...Gusty winds could blow around unsecured objects. 
  Tree limbs could be blown down and a few power outages may 
  result.

* ADDITIONAL DETAILS...Higher gusts are possible. Be sure to
  prepare for potential minor damages and travel difficulties due
  to high winds, especially for high profile and towing vehicles.
  In addition, area lakes will experience dangerously high wave 
  conditions.

PRECAUTIONARY/PREPAREDNESS ACTIONS...

Use extra caution when driving, especially if operating a high
profile vehicle. Secure outdoor objects.

&&

$$

== See also ==
- Gale warning
- Hurricane force wind warning
- Lake wind advisory
- Small craft advisory
- Storm warning
