= Beaufort scale =

Empirical measure describing wind speed based on observed conditions

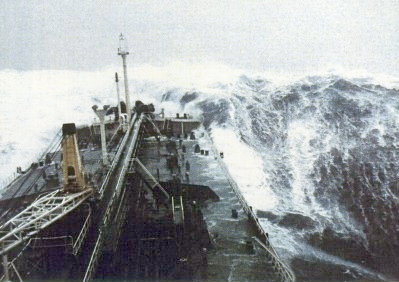
A ship in a force 12 ("hurricane-force") storm at sea, the highest rated on the Beaufort scale

The Beaufort scale (/ˈboʊfərt/ BOH-fərt) is an empirical measure that relates wind speed to observed conditions at sea or on land. Its full name is the Beaufort wind force scale. It was devised in 1805 by Francis Beaufort, a hydrographer in the British Royal Navy. It was officially adopted by the Royal Navy and later spread internationally.

== History ==
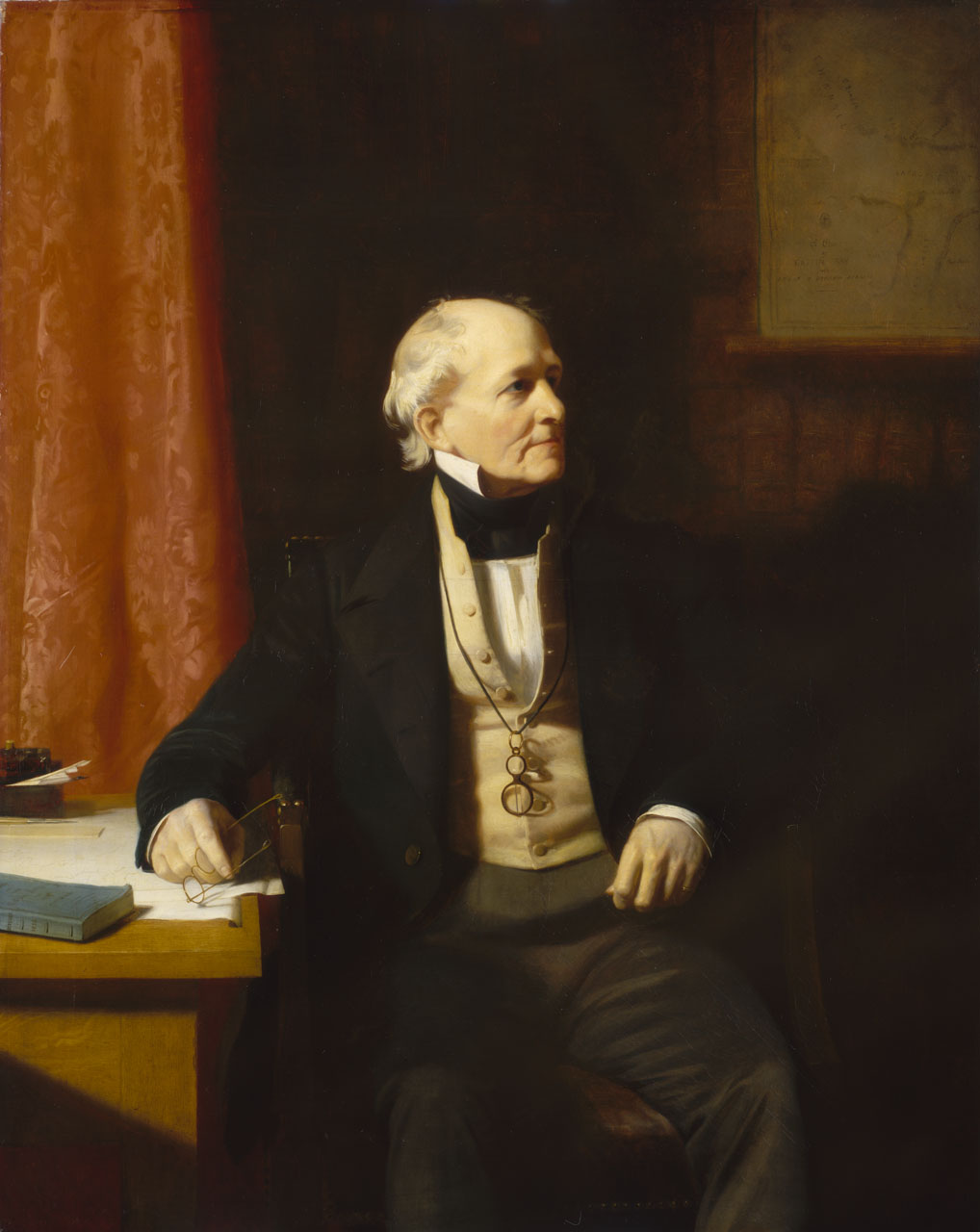
Sir Francis Beaufort

The scale that carries Beaufort's name had a long and complex evolution from the previous work of others (including Daniel Defoe the century before). In the 18th century, naval officers made regular weather observations, but there was no standard scale and so they could be very subjective – one man's "stiff breeze" might be another's "soft breeze" – Beaufort succeeded in standardising a scale. The scale was devised in 1805 by Francis Beaufort (later Rear Admiral), a hydrographer and a Royal Navy officer, while serving on HMS Woolwich, and refined until he was Hydrographer of the Navy in the 1830s, when it was adopted officially. It was first used during the 1831–1836 "Darwin voyage" of HMS Beagle under Captain Robert FitzRoy, who was later to set up the first Meteorological Office in Britain giving regular weather forecasts.

The initial scale of 13 classes (zero to 12) did not reference wind speed numbers, but related qualitative wind conditions to effects on the sails of a frigate, then the main ship of the Royal Navy, from "just sufficient to give steerage" to "that which no canvas sails could withstand".

The scale was made a standard for ship's log entries on Royal Navy vessels in the late 1830s and, in 1853, the Beaufort scale was accepted as generally applicable at the First International Meteorological Conference in Brussels.

In 1916, to accommodate the growth of steam power, the descriptions were changed to how the sea, not the sails, behaved and extended to land observations. Anemometer rotations to scale numbers were standardised only in 1923. George Simpson, CBE (later Sir George Simpson), director of the UK Meteorological Office, was responsible for this and for the addition of the land-based descriptors. The measures were slightly altered some decades later to improve its utility for meteorologists. Nowadays, meteorologists typically express wind speed in kilometres or miles per hour or, for maritime and aviation purposes, knots, but Beaufort scale terminology is still sometimes used in weather forecasts for shipping and the severe weather warnings given to the public.

== Modern scale ==
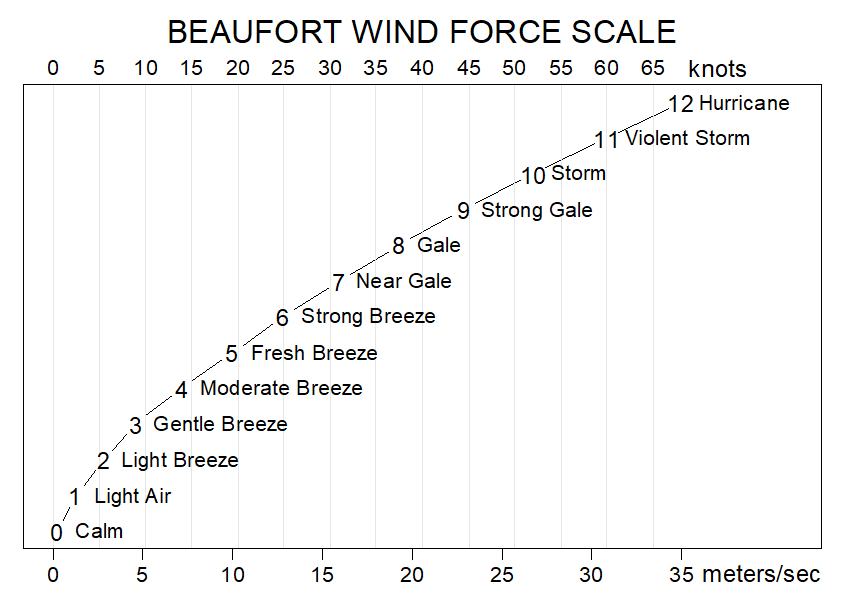
Data graphic showing Beaufort wind force in scale units, knots and metres per second

Wind speed on the modern Beaufort scale is based on the empirical relationship:

- v = 0.836 B^{3/2} m/s
- v = 1.625 B^{3/2} knots ($=\frac{13} {8} \sqrt{B^3}$)

where v is the equivalent wind speed at 10 metres above the sea surface and B is Beaufort scale number. For example, B = 9.5 is related to 24.5 m/s which is equal to the lower limit of "10 Beaufort". Using this formula the highest winds in hurricanes would be 23 in the scale. F1 tornadoes on the Fujita scale and T2 TORRO scale also begin roughly at the end of level 12 of the Beaufort scale, but are independent scales, although the TORRO scale wind values are also based on the 3/2 power law relating wind velocity to Beaufort force.

The table below details the contemporary use of the scale. Wave heights in the scale are for conditions in the open ocean, not along the shore.

Beaufort scale
Beaufort number	Description	Wind speed	Wave height	Sea conditions	Land conditions	Sea conditions (photo)	Associated warning flag
0	Calm	< 1 knot < 1 mph < 1 km/h 0–0.2 m/s	0 ft 0 m	Sea like a mirror	Smoke rises vertically		
1	Light air	1–3 knots 1–3 mph 1–5 km/h 0.3–1.5 m/s	0–1 ft 0–0.3 m	Ripples with appearance of scales are formed, without foam crests	Direction shown by smoke drift but not by wind vanes		
2	Light breeze	4–6 knots 4–7 mph 6–11 km/h 1.6–3.3 m/s	1–2 ft 0.3–0.6 m	Small wavelets still short but more pronounced; crests have a glassy appearance but do not break	Wind felt on face; leaves rustle; wind vane moved by wind		
3	Gentle breeze	7–10 knots 8–12 mph 12–19 km/h 3.4–5.4 m/s	2–4 ft 0.6–1.2 m	Large wavelets; crests begin to break; foam of glassy appearance; perhaps scattered white horses	Leaves and small twigs in constant motion; light flags extended		
4	Moderate breeze	11–16 knots 13–18 mph 20–28 km/h 5.5–7.9 m/s	3.5–6 ft 1–2 m	Small waves becoming longer; fairly frequent white horses	Raises dust and loose paper; small branches moved		
5	Fresh breeze	17–21 knots 19–24 mph 29–38 km/h 8–10.7 m/s	6–10 ft 2–3 m	Moderate waves taking a more pronounced long form; many white horses are formed; chance of some spray	Small trees in leaf begin to sway; crested wavelets form on inland waters		
6	Strong breeze	22–27 knots 25–31 mph 39–49 km/h 10.8–13.8 m/s	9–13 ft 3–4 m	Large waves begin to form; the white foam crests are more extensive everywhere; probably some spray	Large branches in motion; whistling heard in telegraph wires; umbrellas used with difficulty		
7	Moderate gale, near gale	28–33 knots 32–38 mph 50–61 km/h 13.9–17.1 m/s	13–19 ft 4–5.5 m	Sea heaps up and white foam from breaking waves begins to be blown in streaks along the direction of the wind; spindrift begins to be seen	Whole trees in motion; inconvenience felt when walking against the wind		
8	Gale, fresh gale	34–40 knots 39–46 mph 62–74 km/h 17.2–20.7 m/s	18–25 ft 5.5–7.5 m	Moderately high waves of greater length; edges of crests break into spindrift; foam is blown in well-marked streaks along the direction of the wind	Twigs break off trees; generally impedes progress		
9	Strong/severe gale	41–47 knots 47–54 mph 75–88 km/h 20.8–24.4 m/s	23–32 ft 7–10 m	High waves; dense streaks of foam along the direction of the wind; sea begins to roll; spray affects visibility	Slight structural damage (chimney pots and slates removed)		
10	Storm, whole gale	48–55 knots 55–63 mph 89–102 km/h 24.5–28.4 m/s	29–41 ft 9–12.5 m	Very high waves with long overhanging crests; resulting foam in great patches is blown in dense white streaks along the direction of the wind; on the whole the surface of the sea takes on a white appearance; rolling of the sea becomes heavy; visibility affected	Seldom experienced inland; trees uprooted; considerable structural damage		
11	Violent storm	56–63 knots 64–72 mph 103–117 km/h 28.5–32.6 m/s	37–52 ft 11.5–16 m	Exceptionally high waves; small- and medium-sized ships might be for a long time lost to view behind the waves; sea is covered with long white patches of foam; everywhere the edges of the wave crests are blown into foam; visibility affected	Very rarely experienced; accompanied by widespread damage		
12	Hurricane-force	≥ 64 knots ≥ 73 mph ≥ 118 km/h ≥ 32.7 m/s	≥ 46 ft ≥ 14 m	The air is filled with foam and spray; sea is completely white with driving spray; visibility very seriously affected	Devastation		

The Beaufort scale is neither an exact nor an objective scale; it was based on visual and subjective observation of a ship and of the sea. The corresponding integral wind speeds were determined later, but conversions have not been made official.

=== Extended scale ===
The Beaufort scale was extended in 1946 when forces 13 to 17 were added. However, forces 13 to 17 were intended to apply only to special cases, such as tropical cyclones. Nowadays, the extended scale is used in Taiwan, mainland China and Vietnam, which are often affected by typhoons. Internationally, the World Meteorological Organization Manual on Marine Meteorological Services (2012 edition) defined the Beaufort Scale only up to force 12 and there was no recommendation on the use of the extended scale.

Extended Beaufort scale
Beaufort number	Wind speed
13	72–80 knots 83–92 mph 133–148 km/h
14	81–89 knots 93–103 mph 149–165 km/h
15	90–99 knots 104–114 mph 166–183 km/h
16	100–108 knots 115–125 mph 184–200 km/h
17	> 108 knots 125 mph 200 km/h

== Use ==
The scale is used in the Shipping Forecasts broadcast on BBC Radio 4 in the United Kingdom, and in the Sea Area Forecast from Met Éireann, the Irish Meteorological Service. Met Éireann issues a "Small Craft Warning" if winds of Beaufort force 6 (mean wind speed exceeding 22 knots) are expected up to 10 nautical miles offshore. Other warnings are issued by Met Éireann for Irish coastal waters, which are regarded as extending 30 miles out from the coastline, and the Irish Sea or part thereof.

"Gale Warnings" are issued if winds of Beaufort force 8 are expected. "Strong Gale Warnings" are issued if winds of Beaufort force 9 or frequent gusts of at least 52 knots are expected. "Storm Force Warnings" are issued if Beaufort force 10 or frequent gusts of at least 61 knots are expected. "Violent Storm Force Warnings" are issued if Beaufort force 11 or frequent gusts of at least 69 knots are expected. "Hurricane Force Warnings" are issued if winds of greater than 64 knots are expected.

This scale is widely used in the Netherlands, Germany, Greece, China, Taiwan, Hong Kong, Malta, Macau, and the Philippines, although with some differences between them. Taiwan uses the Beaufort scale with the extension to 17 noted above. China also switched to this extended version without prior notice on the morning of 15 May 2006, and the extended scale was immediately put to use for Typhoon Chanchu. Hong Kong and Macau retain force 12 as the maximum.

In the United States of America, winds of force 6 or 7 result in the issuance of a small craft advisory, with force 8 or 9 winds bringing about a gale warning, force 10 or 11 a storm warning ("a tropical storm warning" being issued instead of the latter two if the winds relate to a tropical cyclone), and force 12 a hurricane-force wind warning (or hurricane warning if related to a tropical cyclone). A set of red warning flags (daylight) and red warning lights (night time) is displayed at shore establishments which coincide with the various levels of warning.

In Canada, maritime winds forecast to be in the range of 6 to 7 are designated as "strong"; 8 to 9 "gale force"; 10 to 11 "storm force"; 12 "hurricane force". Appropriate wind warnings are issued by Environment Canada's Meteorological Service of Canada: strong wind warning, gale (force wind) warning, storm (force wind) warning and hurricane-force wind warning. These designations were standardised nationally in 2008, whereas "light wind" can refer to 0 to 12 or 0 to 15 knots and "moderate wind" 12 to 19 or 16 to 19 knots, depending on regional custom, definition or practice. Prior to 2008, a "strong wind warning" would have been referred to as a "small craft warning" by Environment Canada, similar to US terminology. (Canada and the USA have the Great Lakes in common.)

== Weather scale ==
Beaufort's name was also attached to the Beaufort scale for weather reporting:

Symbol	Interpretation
a	active
b	blue sky
c	detached clouds
d	drizzling rain
f	fog
g	dark, gloomy
h	hail
l	lightning
m	misty (hazy)
o	overcast
p	passing showers
q	squally
r	rain
s	snow
t	thunder
u	ugly (threatening)
v	visibility (unusual transparency)
w	wet, dew

In this scale the weather designations could be combined, and reported, for example, as "s.c." for snow and detached cloud or "g.r.q." for dark, rain and squally.

== See also ==
- Bowditch's American Practical Navigator
- CLIWOC
- Douglas sea scale
- Extratropical cyclone
- Saffir–Simpson hurricane wind scale
- Sea state
- Squall
- Tornado intensity
- Tropical cyclone intensity scales
