= Small craft advisory =

Type of wind warning

Small craft advisory pennant

A small craft advisory is a type of wind warning issued by the National Weather Service in the United States. In Canada a similar warning is issued by Environment Canada. It is issued when winds have reached, or are expected to reach within 12 hours, a speed marginally less than gale force. A Small Craft Advisory may also be issued when sea or lake ice exists that could be hazardous to small boats.

The insignia that denotes a small craft advisory is one red, triangular flag (two such flags, one placed above the other, signify a gale warning).

Inland, this advisory is known as a wind advisory. A lake wind advisory is issued for winds just below this range, because unobstructed winds across the open waters of a lake are normally faster than across land.

The wind speed that triggers the advisory has changed over time. Until the late 1960s, the threshold was 32 to 38 miles per hour (or 28 to 33 knots). At some point, the lower limit was reduced to 23 miles per hour (20 knots). Today, however, most places have standardized on 25 to 38 miles per hour (22 to 33 knots), encompassing the combined ranges of forces 6 and 7 on the Beaufort scale. Winds strong enough to trigger a small craft advisory may be referred to as being "advisory-force". Conversely, winds just above this intensity (39–57 miles per hour) are called "gale-force", and have a separate associated warning.

Occasionally an informal lesser advisory, known as "small craft exercise caution", is issued for wind speeds lighter than those that call for a small craft advisory. Criteria for this vary in different localities: sometimes a range of 19 to 24 miles per hour (17 to 21 knots) is observed, or in some places 17 to 23 miles per hour (15 to 19 knots) may be used.

The National Weather Service does not specifically identify what constitutes a "small craft". The size of the boat is only part of what a person should consider when venturing out under such a warning. Weight, displacement and hull design are also important factors and an even more important consideration is not only the craft, but the experience of the captain. The next step above these advisories is a gale warning, known as a high wind warning when issued for inland locations. If the winds are associated with a tropical cyclone, then the next level above a small craft or wind advisory is a tropical storm warning. Occasionally, such bulletins may also be issued for areas above a particular elevation, as wind speeds tend to increase with altitude in the mountains.

== Coastal Warning Display program ==
As of 15 February 1989, the National Weather Service retired its Coastal Warning Display network nationwide.

For over 100 years, display stations were established at yacht clubs, marinas, and Coast Guard stations to hoist flags, pennants and colored lights to warn mariners of storms at sea. The display stations were individually notified by the National Weather Service to raise the signals and again to lower them when the hazards passed. The National Weather Service paid for the visual signals; however, the display stations were operated by other agencies or volunteers. Although the Coastal Warning Display program has been formally discontinued, U.S. Coast Guard and other stations may continue to display warning signals without the direct participation of the National Weather Service.

Beginning 1 June 2007, U.S. Coast Guard formally re-established a Coastal Warning Display program at selected small boat stations which will hoist display flags to warn of small craft advisories, gale warnings, tropical storm warnings, storm warnings, hurricane warnings, and hurricane-force wind warnings.

The Coastal Warning Display program was de-emphasized in favor of frequently updated telephone recordings and NOAA Weather Radio. The latter covers the coastal areas of continental United States, Alaska, Hawaii, and the Mariana Islands with continuous weather broadcasts. The major shortcomings of the Coastal Warning Display program were that the displays reached only the small portion of the marine public within sight of them; it cannot convey specific information on movement, intensity, and duration; and the time required to notify the sites by individual telephone calls takes the forecaster away from critical tasks associated with the weather. Further, when users perceive them to be a full substitute for NOAA Weather Radio, other radio broadcasts, and the telephone recordings, they are actually being a disservice.

== Canada ==
A similar warning, known as a Strong Wind Warning, is issued by Environment Canada's Meteorological Service of Canada from its different offices for the Pacific, Atlantic, and Arctic waters. These warnings are coordinated for the Great Lakes region with American neighboring offices.

Strong Wind Warning was previously referred to as Small Craft Warning and is still (2012) referred to as such in many publications. A Strong Wind Warning is issued for winds in the range 20–33 knots and wave heights 2–3 metres.

== Example of Small Craft Advisory ==
This is an example of a Small Craft Advisory from the National Weather Service Forecast Office in Los Angeles, California.

URGENT - MARINE WEATHER MESSAGE
NATIONAL WEATHER SERVICE LOS ANGELES/OXNARD CA
906 PM PDT FRI MAR 16 2012

PZZ670-171215-
/O.NEW.KLOX.SC.Y.0036.120317T0406Z-120317T1600Z/
/O.EXB.KLOX.GL.W.0016.120317T2200Z-120319T1000Z/
/O.UPG.KLOX.GL.A.0010.120318T0000Z-120319T1000Z/
WATERS FROM PT. PIEDRAS BLANCAS TO PT. ARGUELLO AND WESTWARD
60 NM-
906 PM PDT FRI MAR 16 2012

...SMALL CRAFT ADVISORY IN EFFECT UNTIL 9 AM PDT SATURDAY...
...GALE WARNING IN EFFECT FROM 3 PM SATURDAY TO 3 AM PDT MONDAY...

THE NATIONAL WEATHER SERVICE IN LOS ANGELES/OXNARD HAS ISSUED A
GALE WARNING FOR THE WATERS FROM POINT PIEDRAS BLANCAS TO POINT
ARGUELLO AND WESTWARD 60 NM. THIS WARNING IS IN EFFECT FROM 3 PM
SATURDAY TO 3 AM PDT MONDAY. A SMALL CRAFT ADVISORY HAS ALSO BEEN
ISSUED. THIS SMALL CRAFT ADVISORY IS IN EFFECT UNTIL 9 AM PDT
SATURDAY. THE GALE WATCH IS NO LONGER IN EFFECT.

* WINDS...SOUTHWEST WINDS WILL INCREASE TO 10 TO 20 KNOTS WITH
  FREQUENT GUSTS TO 25 KNOTS TONIGHT AND CONTINUE THROUGH SATURDAY
  MORNING. THE WINDS WILL THEN SHIFT TO NORTHWEST AND INCREASE
  THROUGH SATURDAY AFTERNOON. NORTHWEST WINDS 15 TO 25 KNOTS WITH
  FREQUENT GUSTS BETWEEN 35 AND 40 KNOTS WILL DEVELOP LATE
  SATURDAY AFTERNOON AND CONTINUE INTO SUNDAY EVENING. THE WINDS
  WILL BEGIN TO DIMINISH LATE SUNDAY NIGHT.

* SEAS...SHORT-PERIOD AND STEEP HAZARDOUS SEAS BETWEEN 10 AND 12
  FEET WILL DEVELOP SATURDAY AFTERNOON...THEN BUILD TO BETWEEN 15
  AND 20 FEET SATURDAY NIGHT INTO SUNDAY.

PRECAUTIONARY/PREPAREDNESS ACTIONS...

A GALE WARNING MEANS WINDS OF 34 TO 47 KNOTS ARE IMMINENT OR
OCCURRING. OPERATING A VESSEL IN GALE CONDITIONS REQUIRES
EXPERIENCE AND PROPERLY EQUIPPED VESSELS. IT IS HIGHLY
RECOMMENDED THAT MARINERS WITHOUT THE PROPER EXPERIENCE SEEK SAFE
HARBOR PRIOR TO THE ONSET OF GALE CONDITIONS.

A SMALL CRAFT ADVISORY MEANS THAT WIND SPEEDS OF 21 TO 33 KNOTS
ARE EXPECTED TO PRODUCE HAZARDOUS WAVE CONDITIONS TO SMALL CRAFT.
INEXPERIENCED MARINERS...ESPECIALLY THOSE OPERATING SMALLER
VESSELS SHOULD AVOID NAVIGATING IN THESE CONDITIONS.

== See also ==
- Severe weather terminology (United States)
- Severe weather terminology (Canada)
