= Hurricane warning =

A hurricane warning may refer to

- Hurricane force wind warning, by the US National Weather Service
- Tropical cyclone warnings and watches
