= Square wave =

Square wave may refer to:

- Square wave (waveform)
- Cross seas, also known as square waves
