= Sea state =

General condition of the free surface on a large body of water

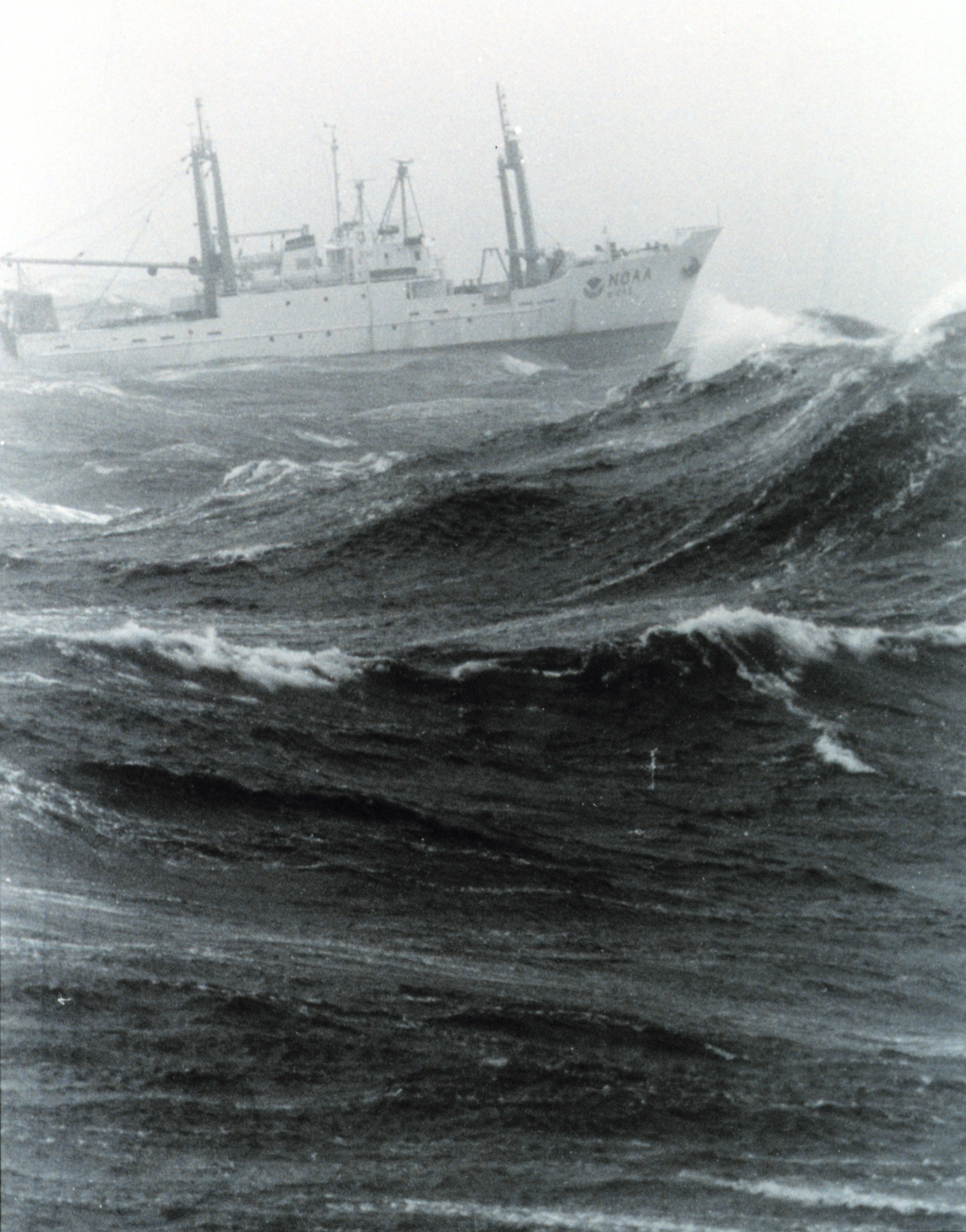
NOAA ship Delaware II in foul weather on Georges Bank.

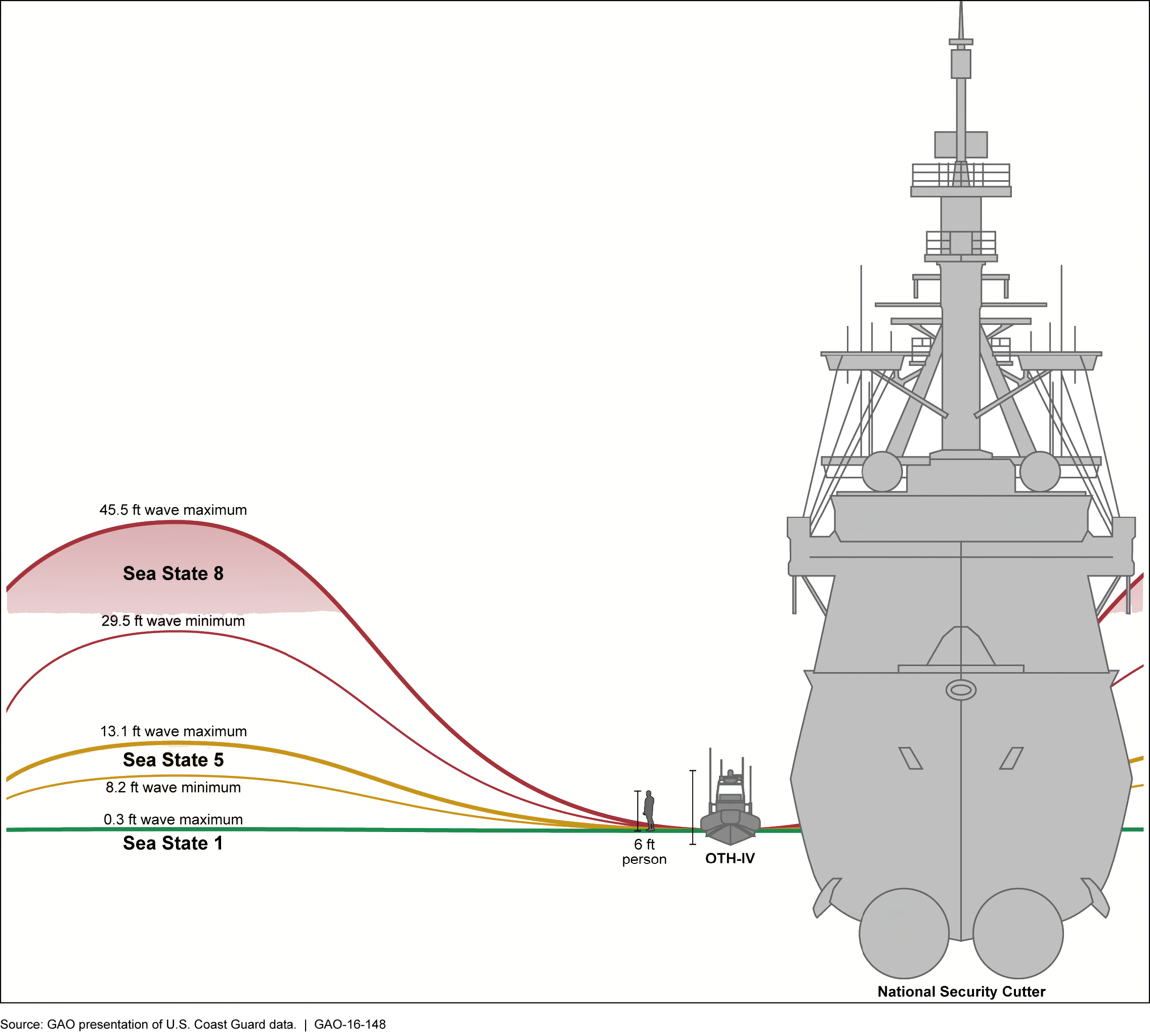
Sea State 5 and 8 range

In oceanography, sea state is the general condition of the free surface on a large body of water—with respect to wind waves and swell—at a certain location and moment. A sea state is characterized by statistics, including the wave height, period, and spectrum. The sea state varies with time, as the wind and swell conditions change. The sea state can be assessed either by an experienced observer (like a trained mariner) or by using instruments like weather buoys, wave radar, or Earth observation satellites.

The short-term statistics describing the sea state are determined for a time interval in which the sea state is considered to be constant. This duration has to be much longer than the individual wave period, but shorter than the period in which the wind and swell conditions can be expected to vary significantly. Typically, the sea state is assumed to be constant for 15-30 minutes.

The large number of variables involved in creating and describing the sea state cannot be quickly and easily summarized, so simpler scales are used to give an approximate but concise description of conditions for reporting in a ship's log or similar record.

== WMO sea state code ==
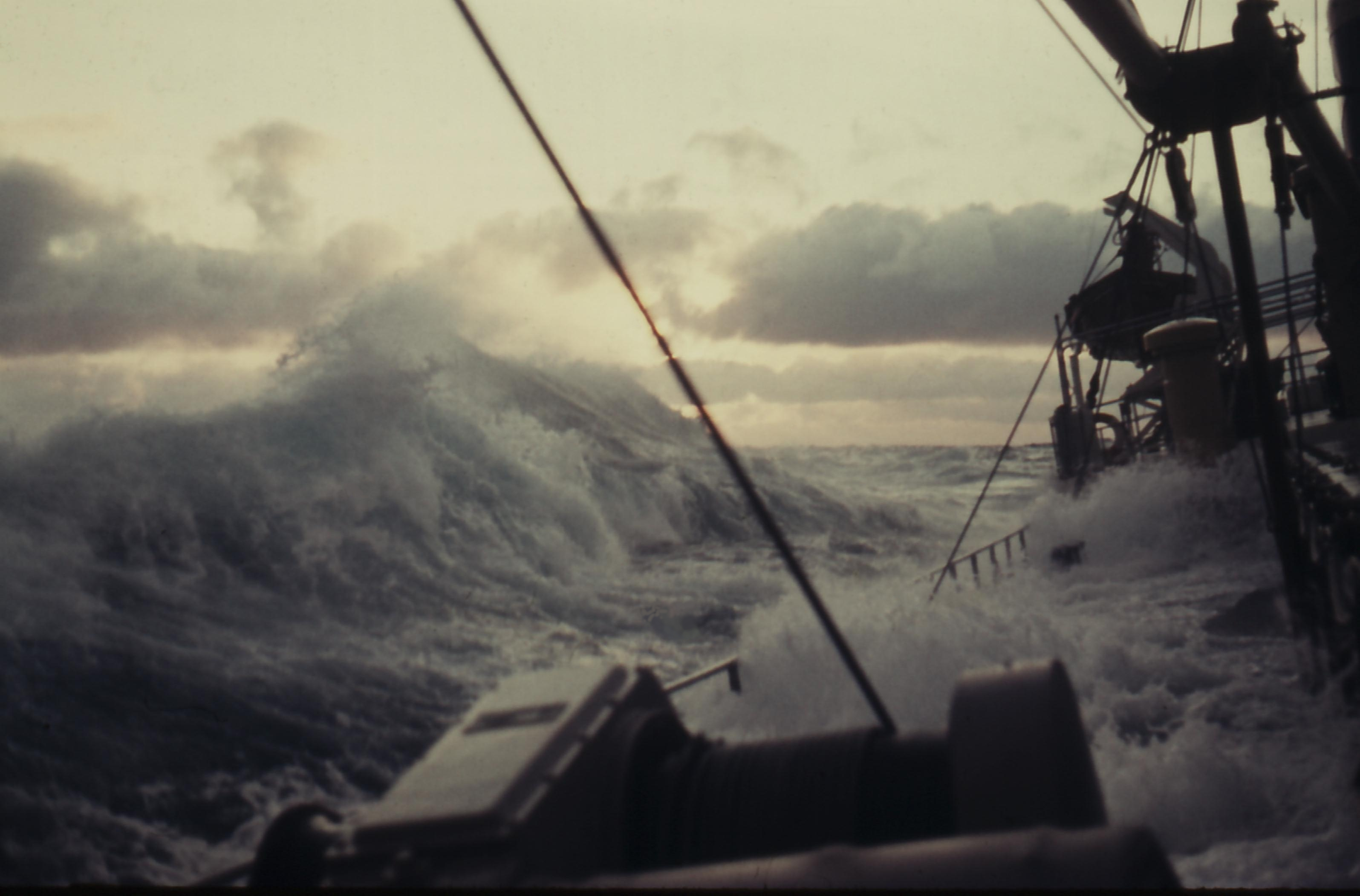
Winter, North Atlantic – Water over deck and hatches, storm with huge waves (1958)

The World Meteorological Organization (WMO) sea state code largely adopts the 'wind sea' definition of the Douglas Sea Scale. The direction from which the swell is coming should be recorded.

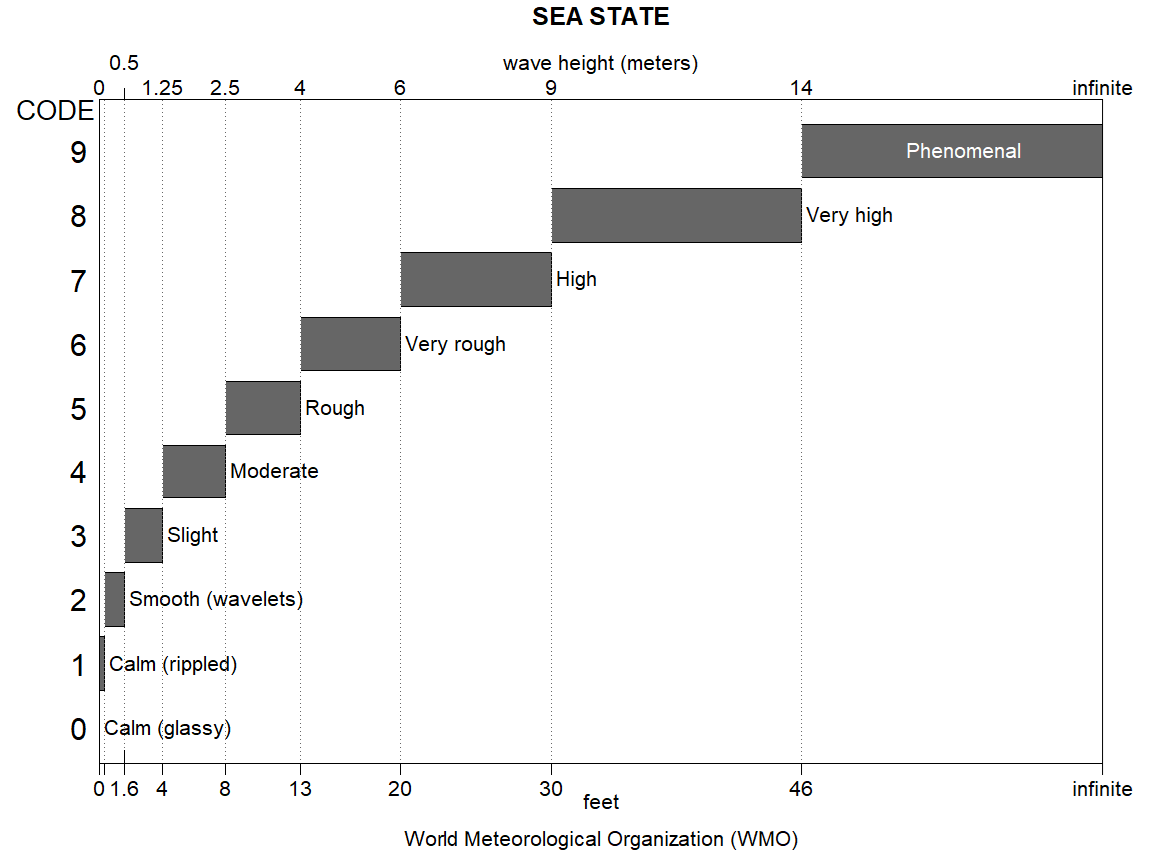
graphic of WMO sea state codes, descriptions, and wave heights in meters

| WMO Sea State Code | Wave height | Characteristics |
|---|---|---|
| 0 | 0 metres (0 ft) | Calm (glassy) |
| 1 | 0 to 0.1 metres (0.0 to 3.9 in) | Calm (rippled) |
| 2 | 0.1 to 0.5 metres (3.9 in to 1 ft 7.7 in) | Smooth (wavelets) |
| 3 | 0.5 to 1.25 metres (1 ft 8 in to 4 ft 1 in) | Slight |
| 4 | 1.25 to 2.5 metres (4 ft 1 in to 8 ft 2 in) | Moderate |
| 5 | 2.5 to 4 metres (8 ft 2 in to 13 ft 1 in) | Rough |
| 6 | 4 to 6 metres (13 to 20 ft) | Very rough |
| 7 | 6 to 9 metres (20 to 30 ft) | High |
| 8 | 9 to 14 metres (30 to 46 ft) | Very high |
| 9 | Over 14 metres (46 ft) | Phenomenal |

Character of the sea swell
| | 0. None |
| Low | 1. Short or average 2. Long |
| Moderate | 3. Short; 4. Average; 5. Long |
| High | 6. Short; 7. Average; 8. Long |
| | 9. Confused |

== Sea states in marine engineering ==
In engineering applications, sea states are often characterized by the following two parameters:

- The significant wave height H_{1/3} — the mean wave height of the highest third of the waves.
- The mean wave period, T_{1}.

In addition to the short-term wave statistics presented above, long-term sea state statistics are often given as a joint frequency table of the significant wave height and the mean wave period. From the long and short-term statistical distributions, it is possible to find the extreme values expected over a given number of years by fitting an extreme value distribution. The extreme value distribution can then inform an engineer about the most extreme significant wave height to be expected during the lifetime of a ship or offshore structure. Using the response amplitude operators of the ship, the engineer can then use the extremes in significant wave height and wave period to calculate the most extreme loads that the ship should be able to withstand. Withstanding significant wave heights that happen on average once in 100 years or once in 1000 years is a common demand for the design of ships and offshore structures.

== CCI Sea State ==
The "Sea State" project within the ESA's Climate Change Initiative (CCI) program created an 18-year data set (2002–2020) covering various sea state-related Essential Climate Variables as measured by the Jason satellite series, other ocean-focused Earth observation satellites, and in situ sources. In 2025, data from CCI Sea State, combined with the new SWOT satellite measurements, were used to describe a new record wave height of nearly 20 m in the open ocean.

== See also ==
- Beaufort scale
- Cross sea
- Douglas sea scale

== General and cited references ==
- Bowditch, Nathaniel (1938), American Practical Navigator, H.O. publication No. 9 (revised ed.), United States Hydrographic Office, OCLC 31033357
- Faltinsen, O. M. (1990), Sea Loads on Ships and Offshore Structures, [Cambridge University Press], ISBN 0-521-45870-6
