= Gale =

Strong wind

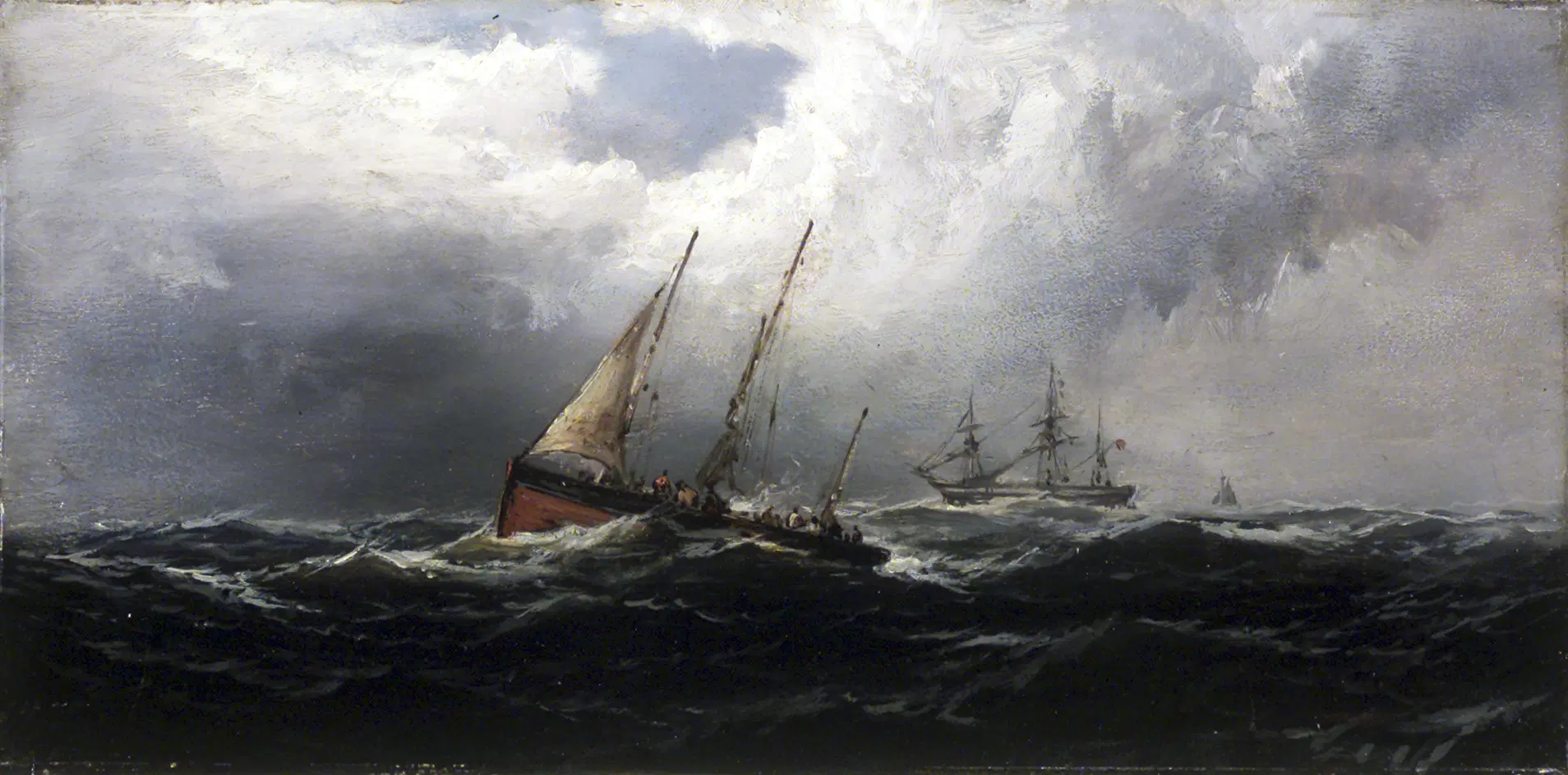
After a Gale – Wreckers by James Hamilton

Gale warning flag

A gale is a strong wind; the word is typically used as a descriptor in nautical contexts. The U.S. National Weather Service defines a gale as sustained surface wind moving at a speed between 34 and 47 knots (63.0 and 87.0 km/h; 17.5 and 24.2 m/s; 39.1 and 54.1 mph). Forecasters typically issue gale warnings when winds of this strength are expected. In the United States, a gale warning is specifically a maritime warning; the land-based equivalent in National Weather Service warning products is a wind advisory.

Other sources use minima as low as 28 knots (52 km/h; 14 m/s; 32 mph), and maxima as high as 90 knots (170 km/h; 46 m/s; 100 mph). Through 1986, the National Hurricane Center used the term “gale” to refer to winds of tropical storm-force for coastal areas between 33 knots (61 km/h; 17 m/s; 38 mph) and 63 knots (117 km/h; 32 m/s; 72 mph). The 90 knots (170 km/h; 46 m/s; 100 mph) definition is very non-standard. A common alternative definition of the maximum is 55 knots (102 km/h; 63 mph; 28 m/s).

The most common way of describing wind force is with the Beaufort scale that defines a gale as wind from 50 kilometres per hour (14 m/s) to 102 kilometres per hour (28 m/s). It is an empirical measure for describing wind speed based mainly on observed sea conditions. On the original 1810 Beaufort wind force scale, there were four "gale" designations whereas generally today there are two gale forces, 8 and 9, and a near gale 7:

Wind force	Original name	Current name	km/h	m/s	mph	knots	Mean knots	Sea state
7	Moderate gale	Near gale	50–61	14–17	32–38	28–33	30	Rough
8	Fresh gale	Gale	62–74	17–20	39–46	34–40	37	Very Rough
9	Strong gale	Severe Gale/ Strong Gale (UK)	75–88	21–24	47–54	41–47	44	High
10	Whole gale	Storm	89–102	25–28	55–63	48–55	52	Very High

== Etymology ==
The word gale is derived from the Middle English gale, a general word for wind of any strength, even a breeze. This word is probably of North Germanic origin, related to Icelandic gola (breeze) and Danish gal (furious, mad), which are both from Old Norse gala (to sing), from Proto-Germanic *galaną (to roop, sing, charm), from Proto-Indo-European *gʰel- (to shout, scream, charm away). Well into the nineteenth century, English-speaking seafarers still referred to relatively modest windspeeds as a 'gale,' if qualified by the kind of sail that could reasonably be set in those conditions (e.g., topsail gale or topgallant gale).
