= 2016–17 North American winter =

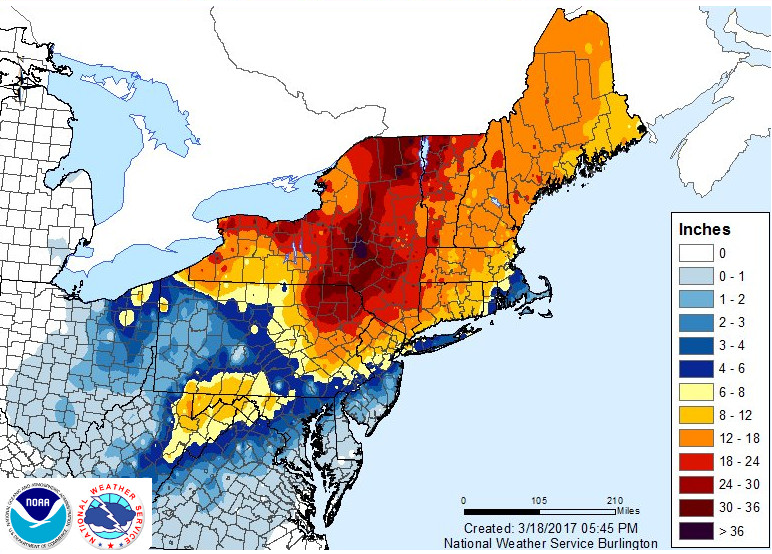
- A map of snowfall totals from a major blizzard that struck the Northeastern United States on March 14–17.

Seasonal boundaries
- Meteorological winter: December 1 – February 28
- Astronomical winter: December 21 – March 20
- First event started: November 19, 2016
- Last event concluded: May 1, 2017

Most notable event
- Name: March 2017 North American blizzard
  - Duration: March 11–15, 2017
  - Lowest pressure: 974 mb (28.76 inHg)
  - Fatalities: 16–19 fatalities
  - Damage: Unknown

Seasonal statistics
- Total WPC-issued storms: 20 total
- Rated storms (RSI) (Cat. 1+): 4 total
- Major storms (RSI) (Cat. 3+): 1 total
- Maximum snowfall accumulation: 58 in (150 cm) at Bolton Valley, Vermont (March 11–15, 2017)
- Total fatalities: 34-37 total
- Total damage: Unknown

Related articles
- 2016–17 UK and Ireland windstorm season

The 2016–17 North American winter was quite warm across North America in general, due in part to a weak La Niña that was expected to influence weather conditions across the continent. Several notable events occurred during the season, including a potent winter storm that affected the East Coast of the United States in early January, the second-largest winter tornado outbreak on record later that month, and an unusually warm February. (Note: February 2017 was the second warmest on record for the contiguous United States, and the warmest on record in Texas, Louisiana, Arkansas, Missouri, Illinois, Indiana, Kentucky, Ohio, West Virginia, Virginia, North Carolina, Maryland, Delaware, Pennsylvania, New Jersey, New York. It was also the second warmest on record for Mississippi, Tennessee, South Carolina, New Mexico, Wisconsin and Michigan. However, North Carolina’s February in 2018 was warmer, as was South Carolina’s. Hundreds of monthly records, and thousands of daily records, were broken.) In addition, towards the end of the season, a large cyclonic storm system that caused a large tornado outbreak, flooding, and a potent blizzard occurred in the Heartland of the country. However, the most notable event of the winter was a powerful blizzard that impacted the Northeast and New England in mid-March, towards the end of the season.

While there is no well-agreed-upon date used to indicate the start of winter in the Northern Hemisphere, there are two definitions of winter which may be used. Based on the astronomical definition, winter begins at the winter solstice, which in 2016 occurred on December 21, and ends at the March equinox, which in 2017 occurred on March 20. Based on the meteorological definition, the first day of winter is December 1 and the last day February 28. Both definitions involve a period of approximately three months, with some variability. Winter is often defined by meteorologists to be the three calendar months with the lowest average temperatures. Since both definitions span the calendar year, it is possible to have a winter storm in two different years.

== Seasonal forecasts ==
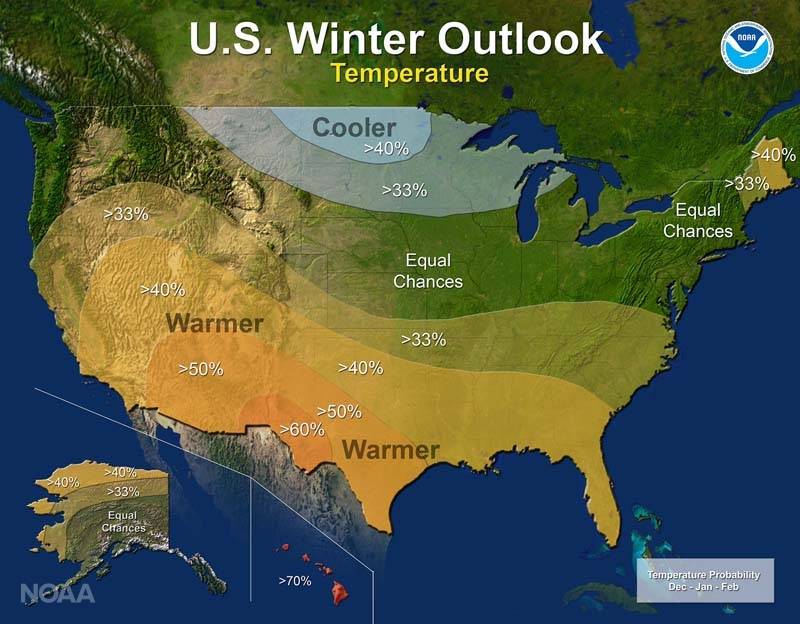
Temperature outlook

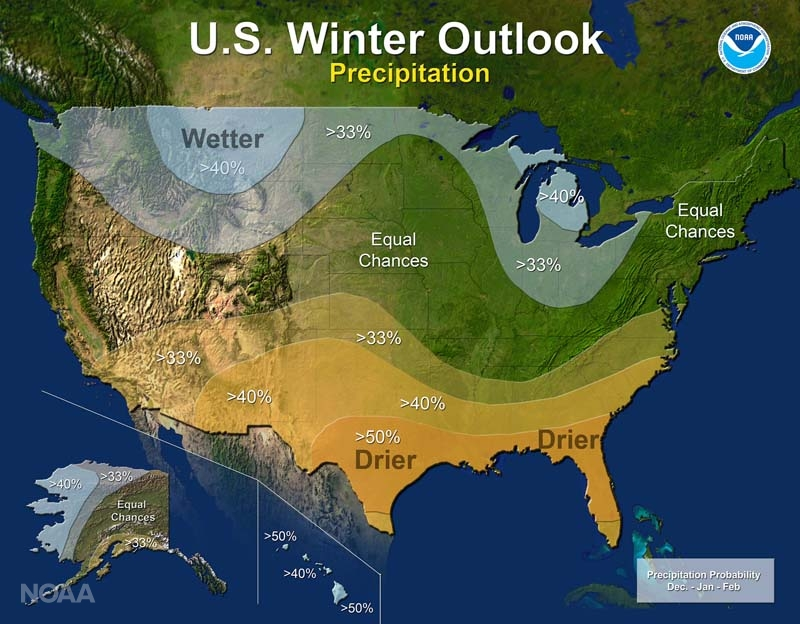
Precipitation outlook

On October 20, 2016, the National Oceanic and Atmospheric Administration's Climate Prediction Center issued its U.S. Winter Outlook. A La Niña was expected to influence winter conditions, and the CPC noted that such conditions were likely to either develop in the late fall or early winter. Forecasters also noted that the La Niña, should it develop, would likely be weak and would probably be short-lived. The outlook indicated that above-average precipitation was favored in the northern Rocky Mountains, Hawaii, western Alaska, and in the vicinity of the Great Lakes. The converse was favored across the entire Southern U.S. and southern Alaska. The outlook favored above-average temperatures across the Southern United States extending through the central Rockies, in northern New England, in northern and western Alaska, and especially in Hawaii. Other regions were given "equal chances" of either above or below-average temperatures. Drought conditions were considered likely to continue in multiple regions already in drought, including parts of California and the Southwest. Such conditions were expected to not only remain but also expand in the Southeastern U.S., and development was anticipated in the southern Plains. Lessening of drought conditions was expected in northern California, western New England, parts of the Ohio Valley, the northern Plains, and the northern Rockies, while the expansion of drought conditions was considered likely in eastern New England.

== Events ==
=== Mid-November winter storm ===
In the middle part of November, a winter storm affected parts of the northern United States; it brought heavy snow to northern Minnesota and caused over 20,000 buildings to lose power in the state. Wind gusts of up to 70 mph were reported from Minnesota to Michigan. Several cities in Upstate New York saw some of their snowiest November days on record, and one town picked up 54.5 inches (138 cm). Large portions of Interstate 81 in New York shut down. Six people died, including three in Minnesota, two in Pennsylvania and one in New Hampshire.

=== Christmas Day blizzard ===
- Category 0 "Nuisance" (RSI/NOAA: N/A)
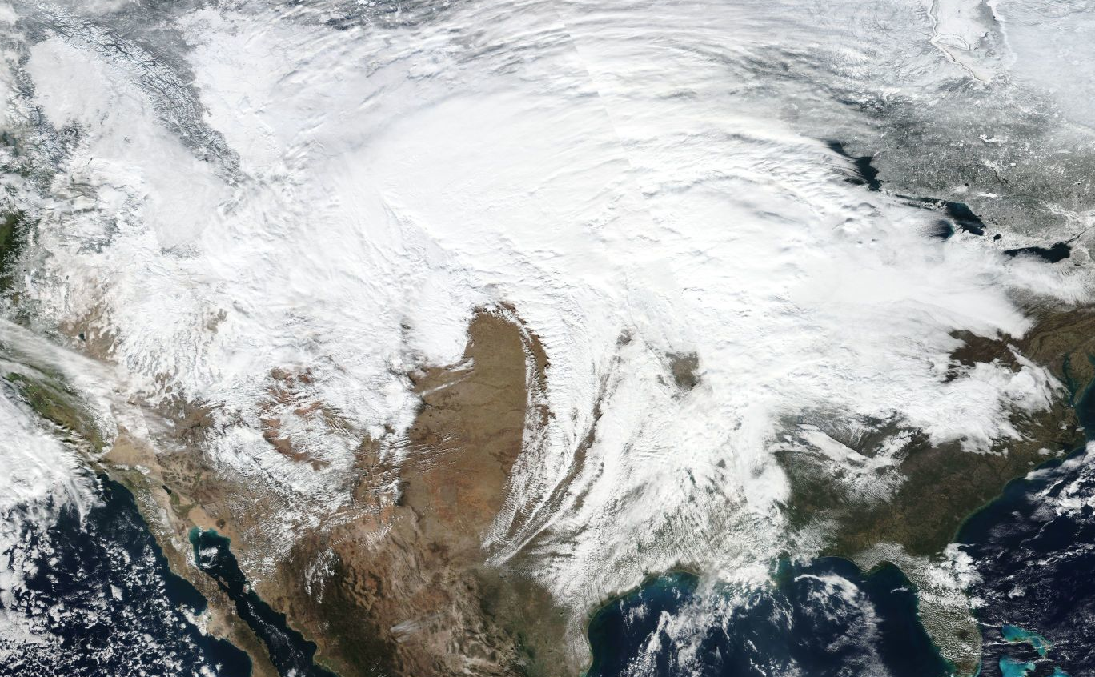
- Duration: December 23 – December 27, 2016
- Lowest pressure: 983 mb (29.03 inHg)
- Maximum snow: 12–24 in (30–61 cm)

Moving ashore on the West Coast of the United States on December 23, an extratropical storm system named Winter Storm Europa by The Weather Channel moved through the Southwest, dumping heavy snowfall before emerging into the High Plains on December 24–25. Prior to its passage through much of the United States, it was expected to drop 1–2 feet (12–24 in) of snow, creating havoc for Christmas travelers. The system brought the potential for severe thunderstorms as well, with two tornadoes and severe winds produced across the central U.S. After the cyclone moved ashore, it dove southeast, weakening somewhat as it began to slowly eject into the High Plains. A squall line begin to coalesce along the system's cold front as the low began to deepen somewhat. An arctic airmass to the system's north helped crank out snowfall as it slowed down in speed and continued to deepen, reaching a minimum pressure of 983 millibars (29.0 inHg) late on December 25. The storm caused over 13,700 residents in South Dakota to lose power, while also resulting in 200 miles (320 km) of I-90 in the state to close. The remaining system moved into Canada and was absorbed by another system on December 27.

=== Early January winter storm ===
- Category 2 "Significant" (RSI/NOAA: 3.5)
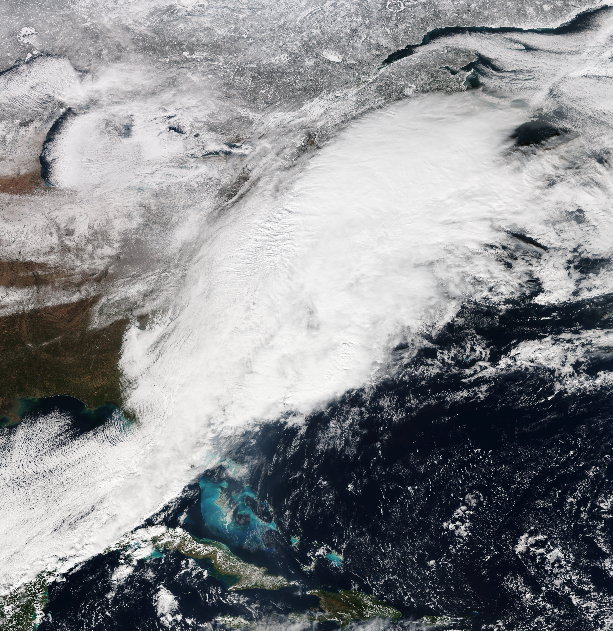
- Duration: January 4 – January 13, 2017
- Lowest pressure: 987 mb (29.15 inHg)
- Maximum snow: 56 in (140 cm)
- Fatalities: 6 fatalities

In early January, a winter storm began to impact the Southeastern United States with snow, ice and rainy conditions as it swept east, eventually moving offshore early on January 7. Afterwards, it began to track northwards and continued to produce snowfall in parts of the Carolinas and eventually the Northeast.

Numerous government offices were closed in Arkansas and Oklahoma in response to the storm. On January 6, 2017, Alabama Governor Robert J. Bentley and North Carolina Governor Roy Cooper declared a state of emergency. Hartsfield-Jackson International Airport in Atlanta had a number of January 7 flights cancelled. Three people died in traffic accidents, one in Kentucky, one in North Carolina and another in Georgia. Eastern Virginia received as much as a foot of snow. In North Carolina, 10 inches of snow fell in Greensboro, High Point, Lewisville and Lenoir, and at one point 25,000 were without power.

=== Mid-January ice storm ===
- Category 0 "Nuisance" (RSI/NOAA: N/A)
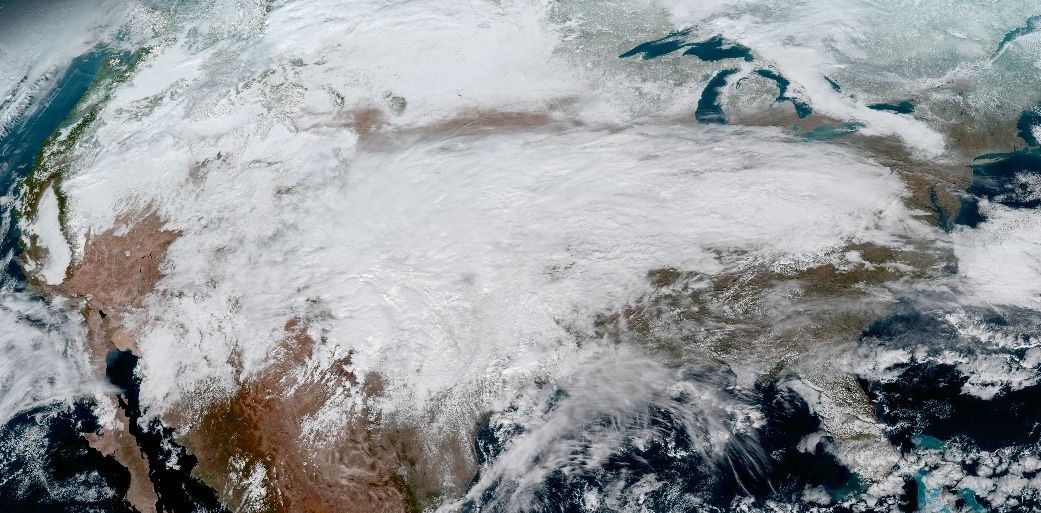
- Duration: January 10 – January 17, 2017
- Lowest pressure: 1006 mb (29.71 inHg)
- Maximum snow: 29.5 in (75 cm)
- Fatalities: 9 fatalities

In mid-January, a damaging ice storm began to form which impacted the Great Plains and American Midwest. On January 13, 2017, one woman from Missouri died while driving in on the icy roads, a National Football League game was postponed, and thousands lost power. Sleet starting falling to the ground on January 23. Many schools had a snow day due to inclement weather on Tuesday the 24th.

=== Late January nor'easter ===
A strong and dangerous tornado outbreak impacted parts of the Southeast, with it being called one of the most prolific January tornado outbreaks recorded. After initially impacting the Southeast, the storm struck the Northeastern United States as a nor'easter, causing high winds, rain, snow, and ice storms. The storms caused wind damage to various buildings, including at least one death, and shuttered several airports and other transportation systems as it passed. It also caused significant beach erosion in parts of New Jersey and flooded coastal communities in New Jersey and Long Island. On the 24th, wind gusts around the New York City metro area approached 60 mph (97 km/h).

Freezing rain and snow caused treacherous traveling conditions across southern Quebec on January 24; at least 100 accidents were blamed on slippery roads.

=== February blizzards ===
A fast-moving but powerful blizzard affected the Northeastern United States with winter weather in the time span of February 8–9. Forming as an Alberta clipper in the northern United States, the system initially produced light snowfall from the Midwest to the Ohio Valley as it tracked southeastwards. It eventually reached the East Coast of the United States and began to rapidly grow into a powerful nor'easter. Up to 18 inches (46 cm) of snow as well as blizzard conditions were recorded in some of the hardest hit areas before the system moved away from the coastline early on February 10.

Another powerful blizzard impacted New England less than a week after the previous one. It formed over the Great Lakes, then moving into the Northeast. It underwent bombogenesis off the East Coast, and stalled out in the Gulf of Maine for over a day. It resulted in a wide swath of over 2 feet (0.61 m) of snow in New England and Eastern Canada. It caused over $3.9 million (2017 USD) in damage, and resulted in 2 fatalities.

=== Mid-March blizzard ===
- Category 4 "Crippling" (RSI/NOAA: 10.66)
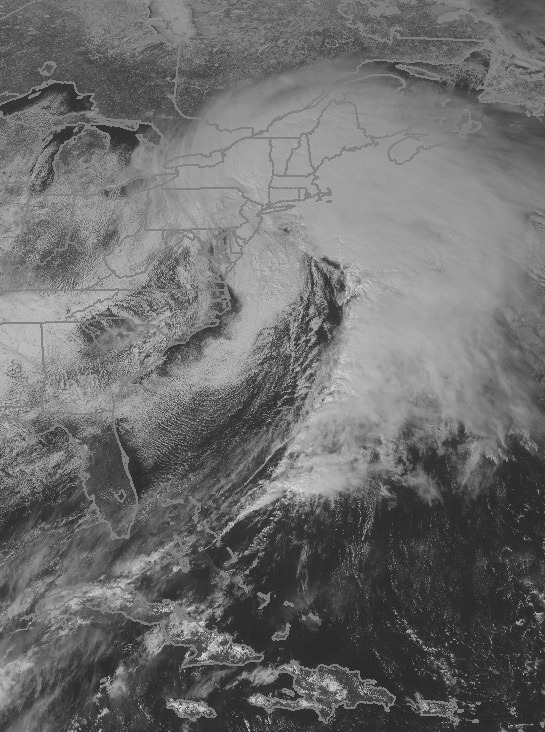
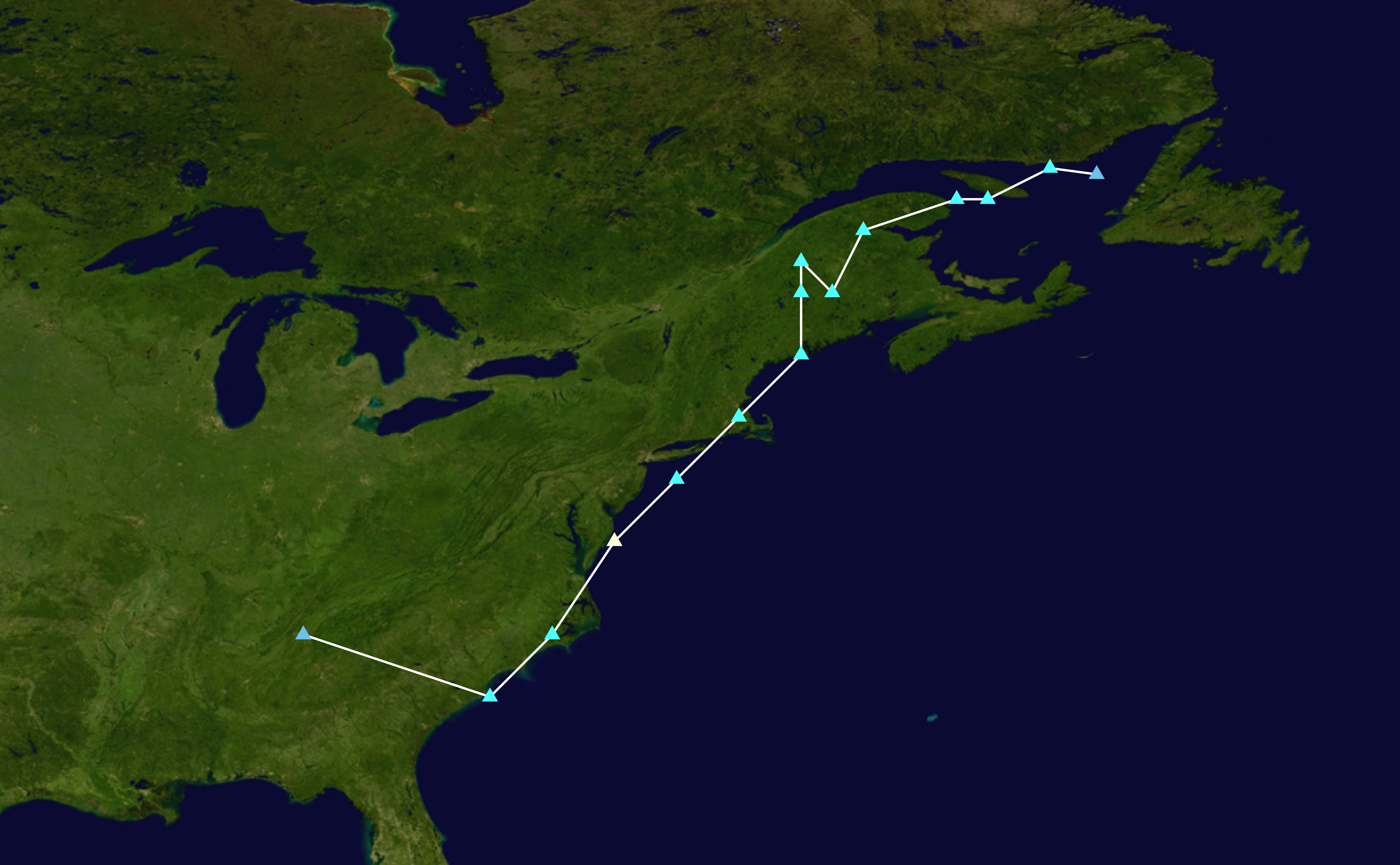
- Duration: March 9 – March 16, 2017
- Lowest pressure: 974 mb (28.76 inHg)
- Maximum snow: 58 in (150 cm)
- Fatalities: 16–19 fatalities

A major blizzard struck the Northeastern United States and Eastern Canada around the timeframe of March 13–15, burying some places under 3–4 feet (36–48 in) of snow. The storm system resulted from the combination of two areas of low pressure that coalesced into one large system that paralleled the East Coast, bringing a widespread area of wintery weather. However, it tracked closer to the coast then expected, cutting down on snow totals in some of the big cities such as New York City, which was originally expected to receive up to 12–18 inches (30–46 cm) of snow but affected more inland ones like Montreal and Sherbrooke (Canada). The nor'easter continued its way further into New England and the Maritimes throughout the day of March 15, before subsiding the next day as it moved away onto Newfoundland.

After the blizzard, a short cold-wave hit the East U.S., while a minor snow storm hit Cape Cod on March 19, causing 1–4 inches (2.5–10.2 cm) of snow.

=== Late April–early May storm complex ===
- Category 0 "Nuisance" (RSI/NOAA: N/A)
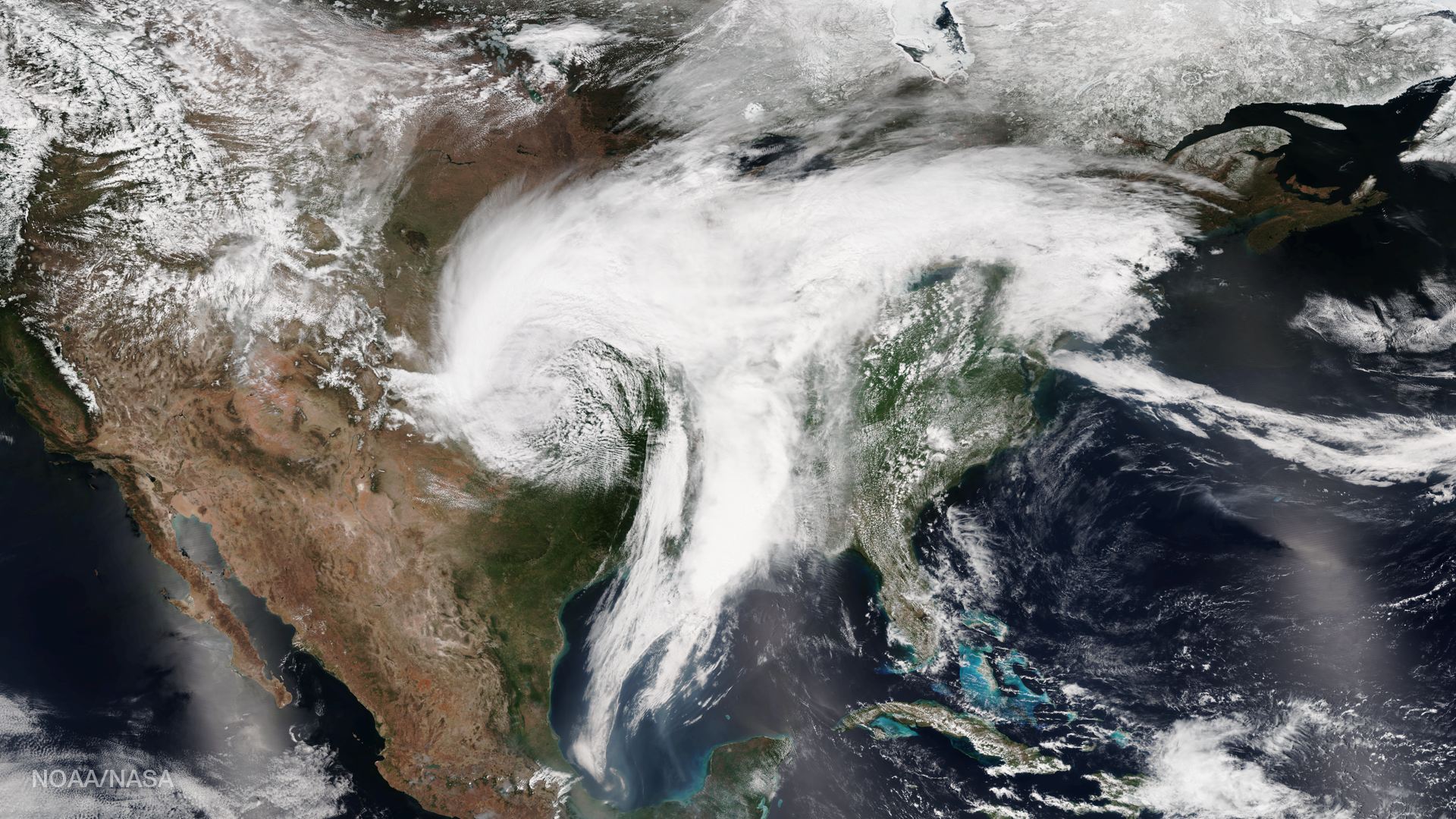
- Duration: April 28 – May 1, 2017
- Lowest pressure: 991 mb (29.26 inHg)
- Maximum snow: 36 in (91 cm)

Near the end of April, a major storm system began to develop in the Rockies with heavy snowfall projected for the Plains and Upper Midwest. The storm system also brought life-threatening flooding and severe weather.

On April 28, residents in Denver, Colorado and other major cities began preparing for the storm. Officials were also worried that because of the time of year where most trees were in full bloom, the heavy wet snow might cause branches to break and fall down, possibly causing power outages. In Boulder, where a golf tournament was being held, officials were prepared for possible delays to the tournament. In the end, Denver picked up 5 inches (13 cm), with higher amounts in the mountains. At the height of the storm, up to 9,200 were reported to be without power in Pueblo.

Previously, the winter storm had dumped up to 2 feet (24 in) of snow in the higher elevations of Wyoming. The state's Department of Transportation also urged residents to stay off the roadways if necessary. In addition, Highway 16 was shut down in the Bighorn Mountains because of the treacherous conditions.

Blizzard warnings were issued for Kansas and the adjacent areas, as heavy snow and gusty winds were predicted. After the storm subsided, about 100 evacuations and 36 rescues were reported. In the northwestern part of the state, 130 miles (210 km) of Interstate 70 was shut down due to the treacherous conditions.

== See also ==
- 2016–17 UK and Ireland windstorm season

== Notes ==
Preceded by 2015–16	North American winters 2016–17	Succeeded by 2017–18
