= Douglas sea scale =

Scale to estimate the roughness of the sea for navigation

The Douglas sea scale is a scale which measures the height of the waves and also measures the swell of the sea. The scale is very simple to follow and is expressed in one of 10 degrees.

== The scale ==
The Douglas sea scale, also called the "international sea and swell scale", was devised in 1921 by Captain H. P. Douglas, who later became vice admiral Sir Percy Douglas and hydrographer of the Royal Navy. Its purpose is to estimate the roughness of the sea for navigation. The scale has two codes: one code is for estimating the sea state, the other code is for describing the swell of the sea.

=== State of the sea (wind sea) ===
Degree	Height (m)	Height (ft)	Description
0	no wave		Calm (Glassy)
1	0–0.10	0.00–0.33	Calm (rippled)
2	0.10–0.50	0.33–1.64	Smooth
3	0.50–1.25	1.6–4.1	Slight
4	1.25–2.50	4.1–8.2	Moderate
5	2.50–4.00	8.2–13.1	Rough
6	4.00–6.00	13.1–19.7	Very rough
7	6.00–9.00	19.7–29.5	High
8	9.00–14.00	29.5–45.9	Very high
9	>14.00	>45.9	Phenomenal

The Degree (D) value has an almost linear dependence on the square root of the average wave Height (H) above, i.e.,. Using linear regression on the table above, the coefficients can be calculated for the low Height values and for the high Height values. Then the Degree can be approximated as the average between the low and high estimations, i.e.:where [.] is the optional rounding to the closest integer value. Without the rounding to integer, the root mean square error of this approximation is:.

=== Swell ===
Degrees	Description
0	No swell
1	Very Low (short or average and low wave)
2	Low (long and low wave)
3	Light (short and moderate wave)
4	Moderate (average and moderate wave)
5	Moderate rough (long and moderate wave)
6	Rough (short and high wave)
7	High (average and high wave)
8	Very high (long and high wave)
9	Confused (wavelength and height indefinable)

=== Wave length and height classification ===
Wavelength

- Short wave 100 m –
- Average wave 100–200 m
- Long wave 201 m +

Wave height

- Low wave 2 m –
- Moderate wave 2–4 m
- High wave 4.01 m +

== See also ==
- Beaufort scale
- Fujita scale
- Saffir–Simpson hurricane scale
- Sea state
- Significant wave height
- TORRO scale
