= Lake wind advisory =

Weather advisory in the United States

A lake wind advisory is issued by the United States National Weather Service local forecast offices when windy conditions on area lakes are expected to be hazardous for boaters and other recreational events on or around lakes.

== Example ==
URGENT - WEATHER MESSAGE
NATIONAL WEATHER SERVICE SHREVEPORT LA
1148 AM CST SUN NOV 11 2012

LAZ017-020-022-TXZ166-167-112200-
/O.EXA.KSHV.LW.Y.0038.000000T0000Z-121111T2200Z/
SABINE LA-GRANT-LA SALLE-SAN AUGUSTINE-SABINE TX-
INCLUDING THE CITIES OF...MANY...COLFAX...JENA...SAN AUGUSTINE...
HEMPHILL
1148 AM CST SUN NOV 11 2012

...LAKE WIND ADVISORY IN EFFECT UNTIL 4 PM CST THIS AFTERNOON...

THE NATIONAL WEATHER SERVICE IN SHREVEPORT HAS ISSUED A LAKE WIND
ADVISORY...WHICH IS IN EFFECT UNTIL 4 PM CST THIS AFTERNOON.

* EVENT...WINDS OF 15 TO 25 MPH WITH GUSTS TO 30 MPH.

* TIMING....

* IMPACT...BOATERS SHOULD USE CAUTION IN OPEN WATERS ON AREA
  LAKES.
 
PRECAUTIONARY/PREPAREDNESS ACTIONS...

A LAKE WIND ADVISORY INDICATES THAT WINDS WILL CAUSE ROUGH CHOP
ON AREA LAKES. SMALL BOATS WILL BE ESPECIALLY PRONE TO CAPSIZING.

&& [1]

== See also ==
- Wind advisory
