= Cross sea =

Sea state with two wave systems traveling at oblique angles

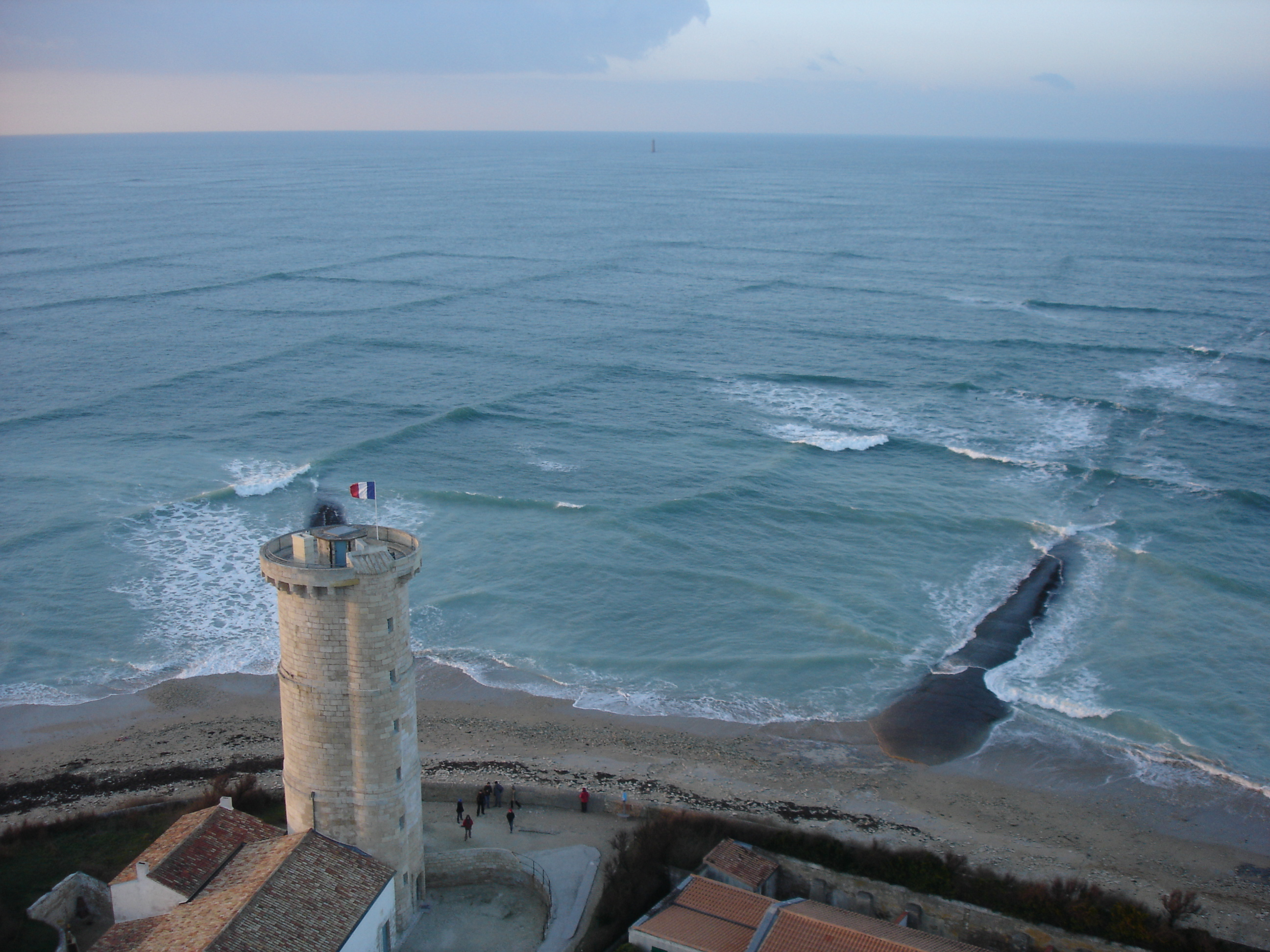
Cross swell at Île de Ré, France. The waves themselves are examples of cnoidal waves.

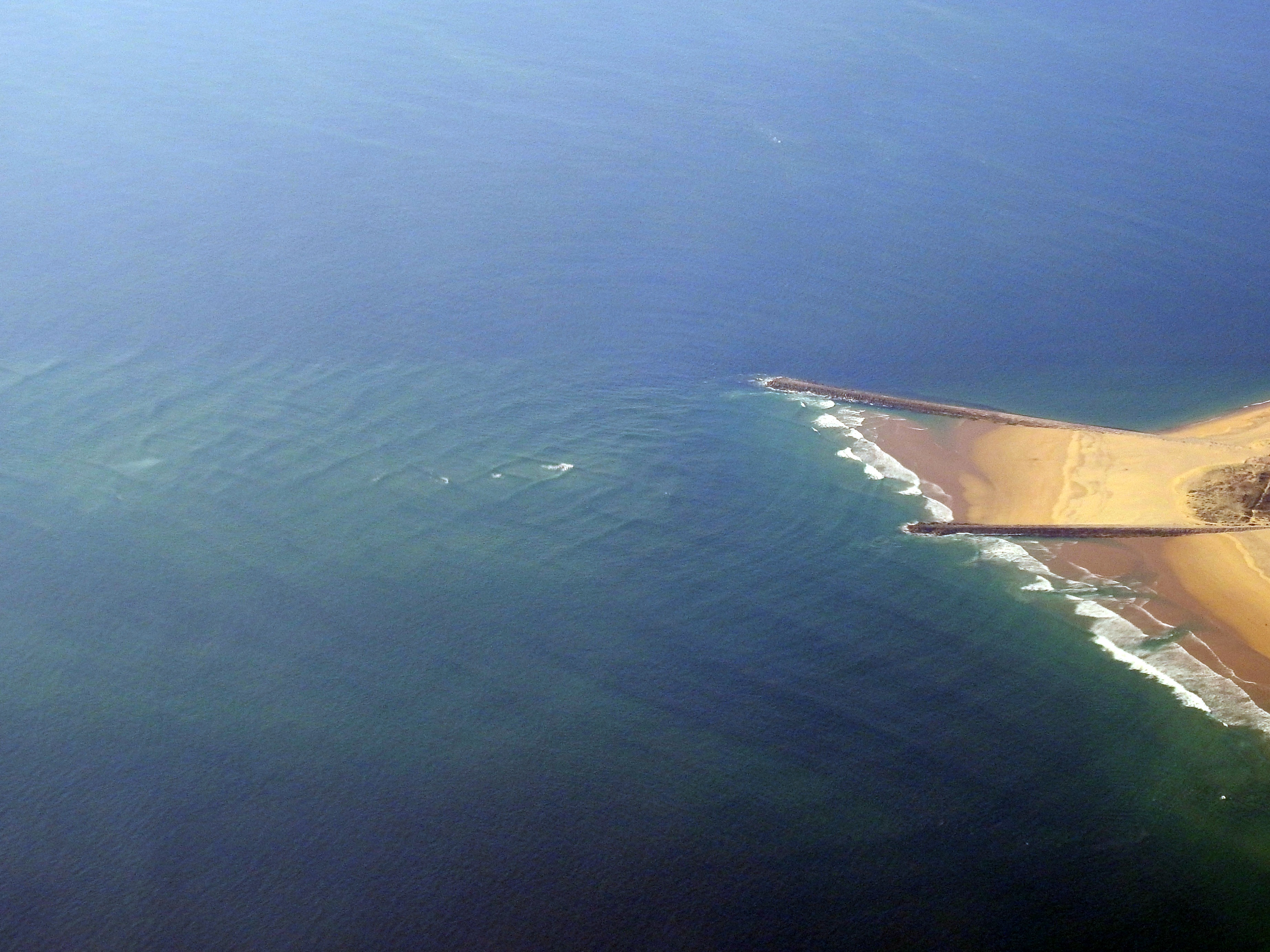
Cross sea near Lisbon, Portugal.

A cross sea (also referred to as a squared sea or square waves) is a sea state of wind-generated ocean waves that form nonparallel wave systems. Cross seas have a large amount of directional spreading. This may occur when water waves from one weather system continue despite a shift in wind. Waves generated by the new wind run at an angle to the old.

Two weather systems that are far from each other may create a cross sea when the waves from the systems meet at a place far from either weather system. Until the older waves have dissipated, they can present a perilous sea hazard.

This sea state is fairly common and a large percentage of ship accidents have been found to occur in this state. Vessels fare better against large waves when sailing directly perpendicular to oncoming surf. In a cross sea scenario, that becomes impossible as sailing into one set of waves necessitates sailing parallel to the other.

Cross seas present a particular hazard for small boats and swimmers, since they can generate rip currents and waves.

A cross swell is generated when the wave systems are longer-period swells, rather than short-period wind-generated waves.
