= Hurricane force wind warning =

Weather warning

Hurricane warning/Hurricane force wind warning flag (USA)

A hurricane force wind warning is a warning issued by the National Weather Service of the United States when sustained winds or frequent gusts of 64 knots (118 km/h, 74 mph) or greater are either being observed or are predicted to occur. The winds must not be directly associated with a tropical cyclone, or a hurricane warning will be issued. If winds are lighter than 64 knots, a storm warning or gale warning will be issued. The hurricane force wind warning is only used to warn of the possibility of wind which reaches hurricane-level severity, but lacks direct connection with a hurricane system. The hurricane force wind can either signal sustained winds of 64 knots, or gusts of 64 knots lasting for two or more hours.

In US maritime warning flag systems, two red square flags with a black square taking up the middle ninth of each flag is used to indicate a hurricane force wind warning (the use of one such flag denotes a storm warning or a tropical storm warning). The flags used to denote hurricane force winds are also used to warn of incoming hurricanes.

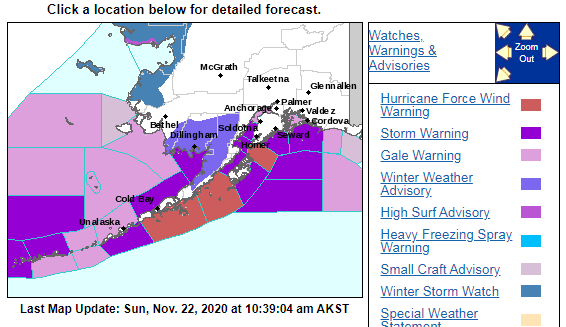
Hurricane Force Wind Warning, as seen on the weather.gov website.

== Example ==
URGENT - MARINE WEATHER MESSAGE
NATIONAL WEATHER SERVICE PORTLAND OR
249 AM PDT MON MAR 12 2012

PZZ255-275-121800-
/O.CON.KPQR.HF.W.0002.000000T0000Z-120313T0100Z/
COASTAL WATERS FROM CASCADE HEAD TO FLORENCE OR OUT 10 NM-
WATERS FROM CASCADE HEAD TO FLORENCE OR FROM 10 TO 60 NM-
249 AM PDT MON MAR 12 2012

...HURRICANE FORCE WIND WARNING REMAINS IN EFFECT UNTIL 6 PM PDT
THIS EVENING...

A HURRICANE FORCE WIND WARNING REMAINS IN EFFECT UNTIL 6 PM PDT
THIS EVENING.

* WINDS...SOUTH WIND 40 TO 50 KT WITH GUSTS TO 70 KT EXPECTED TO
  PEAK MONDAY MORNING OVER THE OUTER WATERS...WITH LOCAL GUSTS TO
  75 KT POSSIBLE OVER THE INNER WATERS MONDAY LATE MORNING AND
  EARLY AFTERNOON.

* SEAS....COMBINED SEAS WILL REACH 28 TO 30 FEET EARLY MONDAY
  MORNING...POSSIBLY HIGHER...THEN EASE TO AROUND 20 FEET BY
  EARLY MONDAY EVENING. SEAS WILL BE QUITE CHOPPY WITH A HIGH
  SOUTH TO SOUTHWEST WIND WAVE COMPONENT...AND A WEST LONGER
  PERIOD SWELL COMPONENT.

PRECAUTIONARY/PREPAREDNESS ACTIONS...

A HURRICANE FORCE WIND WARNING MEANS WINDS OF 64 KNOTS OR GREATER
ARE IMMINENT OR OCCURRING. ALL VESSELS SHOULD REMAIN IN PORT...OR
TAKE SHELTER AS SOON AS POSSIBLE...UNTIL WINDS AND WAVES SUBSIDE.

== See also ==
- Severe weather terminology (United States)
- Small craft advisory
- Gale warning
- Hurricane warning
