= Storm warning =

Meteorological warning about a coming storm

Storm warning flag (US)

At sea, a storm warning is a warning issued by the National Weather Service of the United States when winds between 48 and 63 knots (89 and 117 km/h; 55 and 72 mph) are occurring or predicted to occur soon. The winds must not be associated with a tropical cyclone. If the winds are associated with a tropical cyclone, a tropical storm warning will be substituted for the storm warning and less severe gale warning.

In US maritime warning flag systems, a red square flag with a black square taking up the middle ninth of the flag is used to indicate a storm warning (the use of two such flags denotes a hurricane force wind warning or a hurricane warning). The same flag as a storm warning is used to indicate a tropical storm warning.

On land, the National Weather Service issues a 'high wind warning' (Specific Area Message Encoding code: HWW) for storm-force winds, which also encompasses the lesser gale-force and greater hurricane force winds. In most cases, the warning applies to winds of 40-114 mph for at least 1 hour; or any gusts of 58–114 miles per hour on land unless a tropical storm warning, blizzard warning, winter storm warning, severe thunderstorm warning, or dust storm warning covers the phenomenon. Winds in excess of 115 mph (100 kn) will always result in new issuance of an extreme wind warning shortly before their onset, typically right before the eyewall of a major hurricane makes landfall, but possibly as a substitute for a severe thunderstorm warning in an extreme derecho event. The only exception is that if the extreme winds are associated with a tornado, a tornado warning (or more likely a tornado emergency) will be issued instead.

== Weather Warning Flags (United States) ==
Small Craft Advisory Flag

Gale Warning Flags

Storm Warning Flag

Hurricane Warning Flags

== Recent example ==
The following is a recent example of a storm warning issued by the National Weather Service office in Juneau, Alaska.

URGENT - MARINE WEATHER MESSAGE
National Weather Service Juneau AK
240 AM AKST Wed Feb 11 2026

PKZ661-662-111945-
/O.CON.PAJK.SC.Y.0049.000000T0000Z-260212T0300Z/
/O.NEW.PAJK.GL.W.0029.260212T0300Z-260212T1200Z/
/O.NEW.PAJK.SR.W.0006.260212T1200Z-260212T1500Z/
Dixon Entrance to Cape Decision from 15 to 90 NM-
Cape Decision to Cape Edgecumbe from 15 to 80 NM-
240 AM AKST Wed Feb 11 2026

...SMALL CRAFT ADVISORY REMAINS IN EFFECT UNTIL 6 PM AKST THIS
EVENING...
...GALE WARNING IN EFFECT FROM 6 PM THIS EVENING TO 3 AM AKST
THURSDAY...
...STORM WARNING IN EFFECT FROM 3 AM TO 6 AM AKST THURSDAY...

* WHAT...For the Small Craft Advisory, south winds 20 to 30 kt
  and seas 10 to 15 ft. For the Gale Warning, south winds 35 to
  45 kt with gusts up to 60 kt and seas 15 to 20 ft expected.
  For the Storm Warning, south winds 40 to 50 kt with gusts up
  to 65 kt and seas 23 to 25 ft expected.

* WHERE...Dixon Entrance to Cape Decision from 15 to 90 NM and
  Cape Decision to Cape Edgecumbe from 15 to 80 NM.

* WHEN...For the Small Craft Advisory, until 6 PM AKST this
  evening. For the Gale Warning, from 6 PM this evening to 3 AM
  AKST Thursday. For the Storm Warning, from 3 AM to 6 AM AKST
  Thursday.

* IMPACTS...Storm force winds and hazardous seas will capsize or
  damage vessels and reduce visibility.

PRECAUTIONARY/PREPAREDNESS ACTIONS...

Mariners should remain in port, alter course, and/or secure the
vessel for severe conditions.

&&

$$

== See also ==
- Severe weather terminology (United States)
- Small craft advisory
- Gale warning
- Hurricane warning
