= Gale warning =

Weather forecast including a warning of a gale-force winds

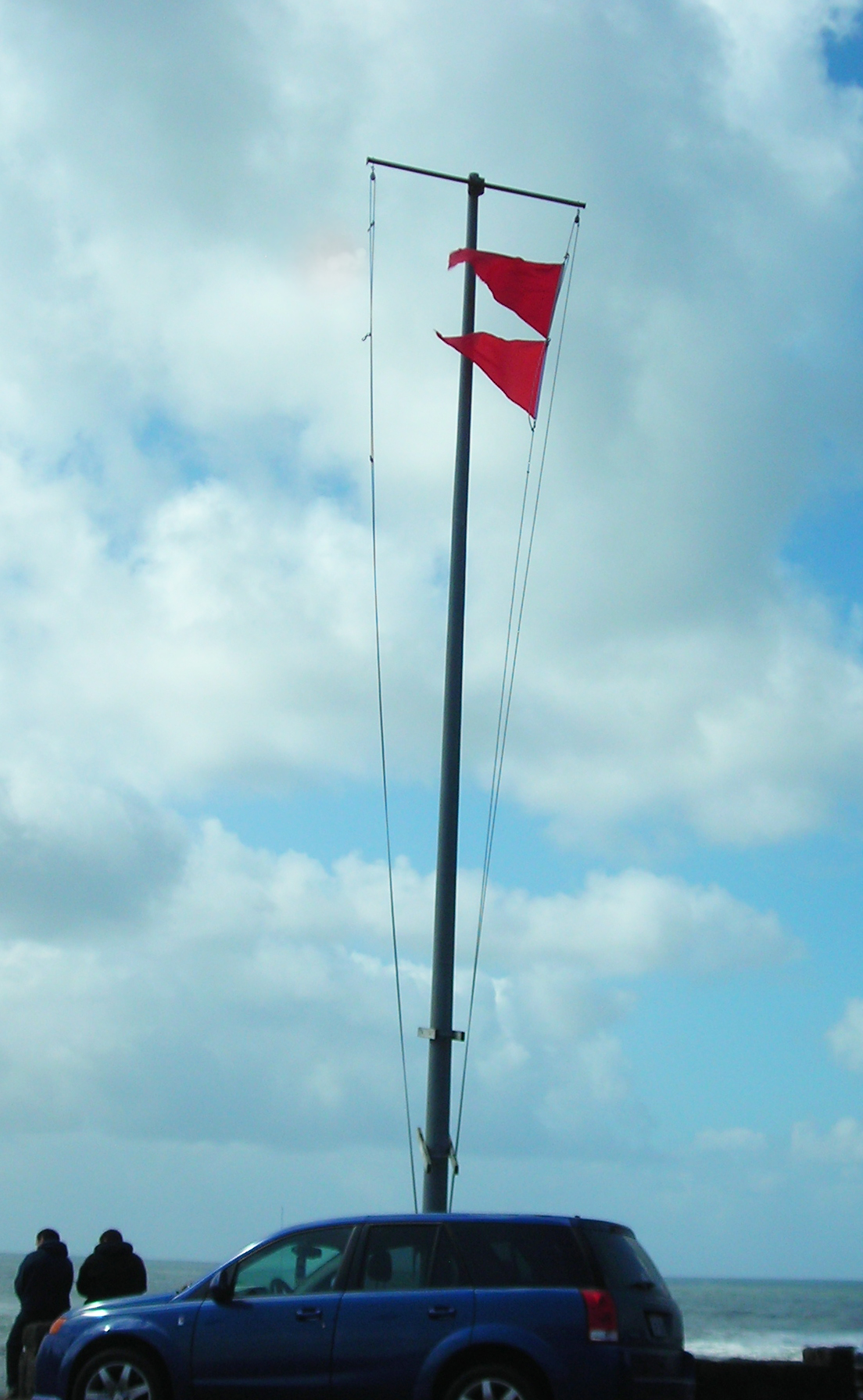
Gale warning flags (USA)

A gale warning is an alert issued by national weather forecasting agencies around the world in an event that maritime locations currently or imminently experiencing winds of gale force on the Beaufort scale. Gale warnings (and gale watches) allow mariners to take precautionary actions to ensure their safety at sea or to seek safe anchorage and ride out the storm on land. Though usually associated with deep low-pressure areas, winds strong enough to catalyze a gale warning can occur in other conditions too, including from anticyclones, or high-pressure systems, in the continental interior. The winds are not directly associated with a tropical cyclone.

== Usage in the United States ==
=== Maritime ===
In the United States, the National Weather Service issues gale warnings for marine areas (oceans, sounds, estuaries, and the Great Lakes) experiencing, or about to experience, winds within the range of 34 knots (63 km/h; 39 mph) to 47 knots (87 km/h; 54 mph). In United States maritime warning flag systems, two red pennants indicate a gale warning; the use of one such flag denotes a small craft advisory.

The National Weather Service issues a storm warning for higher winds of 48 knots (89 km/h; 55 mph) to 63 knots (117 km/h; 72 mph) at sea. In the event of a tropical cyclone, however, a tropical storm warning replaces both the gale warning and the storm warning. In this type of situation, the storm warning maritime flag is also used in lieu of the gale warning pennants, regardless of the intensity of the tropical storm.

=== Land ===
The National Weather Service issues a similar high wind warning (Specific Area Message Encoding code: HWW) for high winds on land. The criteria vary from place to place; however, in most cases, the warning applies to winds of 40 miles per hour (64 km/h) to 73 miles per hour (117 km/h) for at least 1 hour; or any gusts of 58 miles per hour (93 km/h) to 114 miles per hour (183 km/h) on land. It is more severe than a wind advisory, but not as severe as an extreme wind warning, which is generally issued if major hurricane winds are expected from a tropical cyclone. The high wind warning is not issued if a tropical storm warning, blizzard warning, winter storm warning, severe thunderstorm warning, dust storm warning, or tornado warning covers the phenomenon.

== Usage in the United Kingdom ==
In the United Kingdom, the Met Office issues gale warnings, and radio broadcasts them four times a day at fixed times on 198 kHz in the Shipping Forecast, part of the broadcast output of BBC Radio 4. If a considerable time will intervene before the next Shipping Forecast, forecasters may issue an extra gale warning, read between programmes. The Meteorological Office issues warnings for sea areas surrounding the United Kingdom for all predictions of winds of Beaufort scale Force 8 or greater, the forecasts extending as far north as Iceland and as far south as southern Spain.

Robert FitzRoy developed the first weather forecasting and storm warning system. On 1 September 1860 weather reports began to be collected at the Meteorological Office in London via electric telegraph and on 5 February 1861 the first storm warning was issued. After his death in 1865 the storm warning service was discontinued due to the ongoing debate about its scientific accuracy but the increased loss of life caused a public outcry and a campaign in press and in parliament saw the restoration of storm warnings in 1867. The service continues to this day and is now known as the iconic Shipping Forecast.

== Usage in Ireland ==
Met Éireann, the Republic of Ireland meteorological office, issues an area forecast for the Irish Sea and warnings for sea areas around Ireland with headlands of Ireland (e.g. Fair Head, Malin Head, Mizen Head, Carnsore Point) defining stretches of coast.

== Usage in Canada ==
In Canada, the Meteorological Service of Canada branch of the Environment and Climate Change Canada issues a gale warning for lakes, oceans, and other marine areas within the country.

== Usage in the Philippines ==
In the Philippines, the Philippine Atmospheric, Geophysical and Astronomical Services Administration (PAGASA) branch of the Department of Science and Technology (DOST) issues gale warnings during weather disturbances (including typhoons) within the Philippine Area of Responsibility (PAR).

== Example ==
The following is an example of a Gale Warning issued by the National Weather Service office in North Webster, Indiana.

URGENT - MARINE WEATHER MESSAGE
NATIONAL WEATHER SERVICE NORTHERN INDIANA
901 PM EDT WED OCT 29 2014

LMZ043-046-300915-
/O.CON.KIWX.GL.W.0014.141031T1200Z-141101T0900Z/
NEW BUFFALO MI TO ST JOSEPH MI-MICHIGAN CITY IN TO NEW BUFFALO MI-
901 PM EDT WED OCT 29 2014

...GALE WARNING REMAINS IN EFFECT FROM 8 AM FRIDAY TO 5 AM EDT
SATURDAY...

* WINDS...NORTHWEST 15 TO 25 KNOTS WITH GUSTS TO 30 KNOTS BY
  DAYBREAK FRIDAY...VEERING NORTH TO 35 KNOT GALES WITH GUSTS TO
  45 KNOT GALES FRIDAY. NORTH WINDS DIMINISHING TO 20 TO 30
  KNOTS WITH GUSTS TO 35 KNOT GALES LATE FRIDAY NIGHT.

* WAVES..5 TO 8 FEET LATE THURSDAY NIGHT...BUILDING TO 14 TO 20
  FEET FRIDAY...SUBSIDING TO 8 TO 12 FEET LATE FRIDAY NIGHT.

PRECAUTIONARY/PREPAREDNESS ACTIONS...

A GALE WARNING MEANS WINDS OF 34 TO 47 KNOTS ARE IMMINENT OR
OCCURRING. OPERATING A VESSEL IN GALE CONDITIONS REQUIRES
EXPERIENCE AND PROPERLY EQUIPPED VESSELS. IT IS HIGHLY
RECOMMENDED THAT MARINERS WITHOUT THE PROPER EXPERIENCE SEEK SAFE
HARBOR PRIOR TO THE ONSET OF GALE CONDITIONS.

&&

$$

STAY TUNED TO NOAA WEATHER RADIO FOR FURTHER DETAILS OR
UPDATES...OR CHECK OUR WEB SITE AT WEATHER.GOV/IWX/?N=MARINE

== See also ==
- Severe weather terminology (United States)
- Small craft advisory
- Storm warning
- Tropical cyclone warnings and watches
