= List of National Weather Service Weather Forecast Offices =

Weather forecast offices in the United States

Map of regions covered by the 122 Weather Forecast Offices

The National Weather Service (NWS) operates 122 weather forecast offices in the United States. Each weather forecast office (WFO or NWSFO) has a geographic area of responsibility, also known as a county warning area, for issuing local public, marine, aviation, fire, and hydrology forecasts. They also issue severe weather warnings, gather weather observations, and daily and monthly climate data for their assigned area. The local weather forecast offices also control the broadcasts of weather information on the NOAA Weather Radio All Hazards stations. The NWS is divided into six regions.

== History ==
Prior to the NWS reorganization in the 1990s, each state and territory had its own forecast office — with the exception of northern and southern California; north, south, and west Texas; and upper and lower New England. Local offices (NWSOs) then each maintained their own county warning area, and the official hourly and daily readings at the weather station where they were located, typically at a regional airport in a smaller city.

During the reorganization, many of these became forecast offices, while most were closed in favor of cheaper automatic weather stations like AWOS and ASOS. Since then, many offices and weather radars have moved to separate non-airport locations, where they are assigned new location identifiers, such as EYW/KEYW to KEY/KKEY for NWSFO Key West, and BHM/KBHM to BMX/KBMX for Birmingham radar.

In 2025, following the termination of 880 NOAA employees, it was announced that the National Weather Service office in Goodland, Kansas was the first NWS office no longer operating 24/7 and that "about a dozen more" are likely to stop 24/7 service as well.

== Forecast offices ==
=== Alaska Region (3 offices) ===
Forecast office	State	Office call sign	Address
Anchorage	Alaska	AFC	6930 Sand Lake Rd, Anchorage, AK 99502
Fairbanks	Alaska	AFG	UAF-Akasofu Building, Fairbanks, AK 99775-7345
Juneau	Alaska	AJK	8500 Mendenhall Loop Rd, Juneau, AK 99801

=== Central Region (38 offices) ===
Forecast office	State	Office call sign	Address
Denver - Boulder	Colorado	BOU	325 Broadway Boulder, CO 80305
Grand Junction	Colorado	GJT	2844 Aviators Way Grand Junction, CO 81506
Pueblo	Colorado	PUB	3 Eaton Way Pueblo, CO 81001
Chicago	Illinois	LOT	250 George J Michas Dr, Romeoville, IL 60446
Lincoln	Illinois	ILX	1362 State Route 10 Lincoln, IL 62656
Indianapolis	Indiana	IND	6900 West Hanna Avenue Indianapolis, IN 46241
Northern Indiana	Indiana	IWX	7506 E 850 N Syracuse, IN 46567
Davenport/Quad Cities	Iowa	DVN	9040 N Harrison Street, Davenport, IA, 52806
Des Moines	Iowa	DMX	9607 NW Beaver Drive Johnston, IA 50131
Dodge City	Kansas	DDC	102 Airport Road Dodge City, KS, 67801
Goodland	Kansas	GLD	920 Armory Road Goodland, KS 67735
Topeka	Kansas	TOP	1116 NE Strait Avenue Topeka, KS 66616
Wichita	Kansas	ICT	2142 S. Tyler Road Wichita, KS 67209
Jackson	Kentucky	JKL	1329 Airport Road Jackson, KY 41339
Louisville	Kentucky	LMK	6201 Theiler Lane Louisville, KY 40229
Paducah	Kentucky	PAH	8250 Kentucky Highway 3520 West Paducah, KY 42086
Detroit/Pontiac	Michigan	DTX	9200 White Lake Road White Lake, MI 48386
Gaylord	Michigan	APX	8800 Passenheim Road Gaylord, MI 49735
Grand Rapids	Michigan	GRR	4899 Tim Dougherty Dr, Grand Rapids, MI 49512
Marquette	Michigan	MQT	112 Airpark Drive South Negaunee, MI 49866
Duluth	Minnesota	DLH	5027 Miller Trunk Highway Duluth, MN 55811
Chanhassen/Twin Cities	Minnesota	MPX	1733 Lake Drive West Chanhassen, MN, 55317
Kansas City/Pleasant Hill	Missouri	EAX	1803 North 7 Highway Pleasant Hill, MO 64080
Springfield	Missouri	SGF	5805 West Highway EE Springfield, MO 65802
St. Louis	Missouri	LSX	12 Missouri Research Park Drive St. Charles, MO 63304
Hastings	Nebraska	GID	6365 North Osborne Drive West Hastings, NE 68901
North Platte	Nebraska	LBF	5250 E. Lee Bird Drive North Platte, NE 69101
Omaha/Valley	Nebraska	OAX	6707 North 288th Street Valley, NE 68064
Bismarck	North Dakota	BIS	2301 University Drive Building 27 Bismarck, ND 58504
Grand Forks	North Dakota	FGF	4797 Technology Circle Grand Forks, ND 58203
Aberdeen	South Dakota	ABR	824 391st Ave S. Aberdeen, SD 57401-9311
Rapid City	South Dakota	UNR	300 East Signal Drive Rapid City, SD 57701
Sioux Falls	South Dakota	FSD	26 Weather Lane Sioux Falls, SD 57104
Green Bay	Wisconsin	GRB	2485 South Point Road Green Bay, WI 54313
La Crosse	Wisconsin	ARX	N2788 County Road FA La Crosse, WI 54601
Milwaukee/Sullivan	Wisconsin	MKX	N3533 Hardscrabble Road Dousman, WI 53118
Cheyenne	Wyoming	CYS	1301 Airport Parkway Cheyenne, WY 82001
Riverton	Wyoming	RIW	12744 West US Highway 26 Riverton, WY 82501

=== Eastern Region (23 offices) ===
Forecast office	State	Office call sign	Address
Caribou	Maine	CAR	810 Main St, Caribou, ME 04736
Gray/Portland	Maine	GYX	1 Weather Ln, Gray, ME 04039
Boston/Norton	Massachusetts	BOX	46 Commerce Way, Norton, MA 02766
Mount Holly/Philadelphia	New Jersey	PHI	732 Woodlane Rd, Mt Holly, NJ 08060
Albany	New York	ALY	1400 Washington Avenue, Albany, NY 12222
Binghamton	New York	BGM	32 Dawes Dr, Johnson City, NY 13790
Buffalo	New York	BUF	587 Aero Drive, Cheektowaga, NY 14225
New York/Upton	New York	OKX	175 Brookhaven Ave, Upton, NY 11973
Newport/Morehead City	North Carolina	MHX	533 Roberts Rd, Newport, NC 28570
Raleigh	North Carolina	RAH	1005 Capability Dr #300, Raleigh, NC 27606
Wilmington	North Carolina	ILM	2015 Gardner Dr, Wilmington, NC 28405
Cleveland	Ohio	CLE	925 Keynote Circle Suite 314, Brooklyn Heights, OH 44131
Wilmington (de facto “Cincinnati/Wilmington”)	Ohio	ILN	1901 OH-134, Wilmington, OH 45177
Pittsburgh	Pennsylvania	PBZ	192 Shafer Rd, Coraopolis, PA 15108
State College	Pennsylvania	CTP	328 Innovation Blvd, State College, PA 16803
Charleston	South Carolina	CHS	5777 S Aviation Ave, North Charleston, SC 29406
Columbia	South Carolina	CAE	2909 Aviation Way, West Columbia, SC 29170
Greenville-Spartanburg	South Carolina	GSP	1549 GSP Dr, Greer, SC 29651
Burlington	Vermont	BTV	1200 Airport Dr, South Burlington, VT 05403
Baltimore/Washington	Virginia	LWX	43858 Weather Service Road, Sterling, VA 20166
Blacksburg/Roanoke	Virginia	RNK	1750 Forecast Dr, Blacksburg, VA 24060
Wakefield	Virginia	AKQ	10009 General Mahone Hwy, Wakefield, VA 23888
Charleston	West Virginia	RLX	1754 Hendrickson Dr, South Charleston, WV 25303

=== Pacific Region (2 offices) ===
Forecast office	State	Office call sign	Address
Guam	Guam	GUM	3232 Hueneme Rd, Barrigada, GU, 96913
Honolulu	Hawaii	HFO	2525 Correa Rd # 250, Honolulu, HI 96822

=== Southern Region (32 offices) ===
Forecast office	State	Office call sign	Address
Birmingham	Alabama	BMX	465 Weather Vane Rd, Calera, AL 35040
Huntsville	Alabama	HUN	320 Sparkman Dr NW, Huntsville, AL 35805
Mobile/Pensacola	Alabama	MOB	8400 Airport Blvd #11, Mobile, AL 36608
Little Rock	Arkansas	LZK	8400 Remount Rd, North Little Rock, AR 72118
Jacksonville	Florida	JAX	13701 Fang Dr, Jacksonville, FL 32218
Key West	Florida	KEY	1315 White St, Key West, FL 33040
Melbourne	Florida	MLB	421 Croton Rd, Melbourne, FL 32901
Miami	Florida	MFL	11691 SW 17th Street Miami, FL 33165
Tallahassee	Florida	TAE	1017 Academic Way FSU, Love Bldg, 4th Floor, Tallahassee, FL 32306-4509
Tampa	Florida	TBW	2525 14th Ave SE, Ruskin, FL 33570
Peachtree City/Atlanta	Georgia	FFC	4 Falcon Dr, Peachtree City, GA 30269
Lake Charles	Louisiana	LCH	300 E Tank Farm Rd, Lake Charles, LA 70607
New Orleans/Baton Rouge	Louisiana	LIX	62300 Airport Rd. Slidell, LA 70460
Shreveport	Louisiana	SHV	5655 Hollywood Ave, Shreveport, LA 71109
Jackson	Mississippi	JAN	234 Weather Service Dr, Flowood, MS 39232
Albuquerque	New Mexico	ABQ	2341 Clark Carr Loop SE, Albuquerque, NM 87106
Norman/Oklahoma City	Oklahoma	OUN	120 David L. Boren Blvd. Suite 2400, Norman, OK 73072
Tulsa	Oklahoma	TSA	10159 E 11th St #300, Tulsa, OK 74128
San Juan	Puerto Rico	SJU	5000 Expreso Román Baldorioty de Castro, Carolina, PR 00979
Memphis	Tennessee	MEG	7777 Walnut Grove Rd #1, Memphis, TN 38120
Morristown/Knoxville	Tennessee	MRX	5974 Commerce Blvd, Morristown, TN 37814
Nashville	Tennessee	OHX	500 Weather Station Rd, Old Hickory, TN 37138
Amarillo	Texas	AMA	1900 English Rd, Amarillo, TX 79108
Austin/San Antonio	Texas	EWX	2090 Airport Rd, New Braunfels, TX 78130
Brownsville	Texas	BRO	20 S Vermillion Ave, Brownsville, TX 78521
Corpus Christi	Texas	CRP	426 Pinson Dr, Corpus Christi, TX 78406
El Paso	Texas	EPZ	7955 Airport Rd, Santa Teresa, NM 88008
Fort Worth-Dallas	Texas	FWD	3401 Northern Cross Blvd, Fort Worth, TX 76137
Houston/Galveston	Texas	HGX	1353 FM646, Dickinson, TX 77539
Lubbock	Texas	LUB	2579 S Loop 289 #100, Lubbock, TX 79423
Midland/Odessa	Texas	MAF	2500 Challenger Dr, Midland, TX 79706
San Angelo	Texas	SJT	7654 Knickerbocker Rd, San Angelo, TX 76904

=== Western Region (24 offices) ===
Forecast office	State	Office call sign	Address
Flagstaff	Arizona	FGZ	Building 49 Hughes Ave, Bellemont, AZ 86015
Phoenix	Arizona	PSR	2727 E Washington St, NWS PAB 1TA, Phoenix, AZ 85034
Tucson	Arizona	TWC	520 N Park Ave #304, Tucson, AZ 85719
Eureka	California	EKA	300 Startare Dr, Eureka, CA 95501
Los Angeles/Oxnard	California	LOX	520 N Elevar St, Oxnard, CA 93030
Sacramento	California	STO	3310 El Camino Ave # 228, Sacramento, CA 95821
San Diego	California	SGX	11440 W Bernardo Ct #230, San Diego, CA 92127
San Francisco Bay Area/Monterey	California	MTR	21 Grace Hopper Ave, Monterey, CA 93943
San Joaquin Valley/Hanford	California	HNX	900 Foggy Bottom Rd, Hanford, CA 93230
Boise	Idaho	BOI	NIFC Building 3807, 3833 Development Ave, Boise, ID 83705
Pocatello	Idaho	PIH	1945 Beechcraft Ave, Pocatello, ID 83204
Billings	Montana	BYZ	2170 Overland Ave, Billings, MT 59102
Glasgow	Montana	GGW	92 Airport Rd, Glasgow, MT 59230
Great Falls	Montana	TFX	5324 Tri Hill Frontage Rd, Great Falls, MT 59404
Missoula	Montana	MSO	6633 Aviation Way, Missoula, MT 59808
Elko	Nevada	LKN	3720 Paradise Dr, Elko, NV 89801
Las Vegas	Nevada	VEF	7851 Dean Martin Dr, Las Vegas, NV 89139
Reno	Nevada	REV	2350 Raggio Pkwy, Reno, NV 89512
Medford	Oregon	MFR	4003 Cirrus Dr, Medford, OR 97504
Pendleton	Oregon	PDT	2001 NW 56th St, Pendleton, OR 97801
Portland	Oregon	PQR	5241 NE 122nd Ave, Portland, OR 97230
Salt Lake City	Utah	SLC	2242 W North Temple, Salt Lake City, UT 84116
Seattle	Washington	SEW	7600 Sand Point Way NE, Seattle, WA 98115
Spokane	Washington	OTX	2601 N Rambo Rd, Spokane, WA 99224

An interactive map of all six regions with links to individual WFOs can be found here: https://www.weather.gov/srh/nwsoffices
