= Tropical Storm Alberto (1994) =

Atlantic tropical storm in 1994

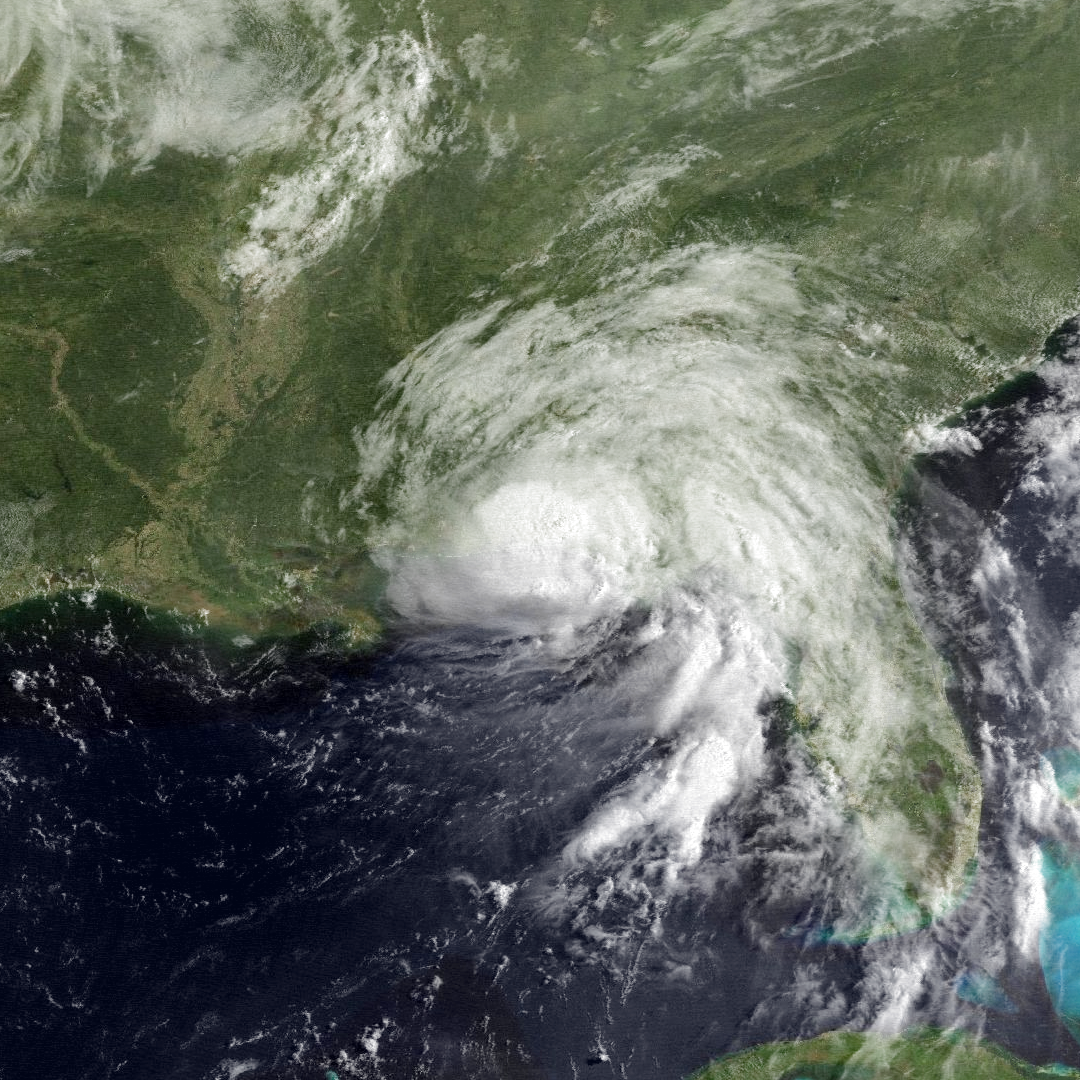
- Tropical Storm Alberto at peak intensity making landfall in western Florida on July 3

Meteorological history
- Formed: June 30, 1994
- Dissipated: July 7, 1994

Tropical storm
- 1-minute sustained (SSHWS/NWS)
- Highest winds: 65 mph (100 km/h)
- Lowest pressure: 993 mbar (hPa); 29.32 inHg

Overall effects
- Fatalities: 33 total
- Damage: $1.03 billion (1994 USD)
- Areas affected: Florida Panhandle, Alabama, Georgia
- IBTrACS
- Part of the 1994 Atlantic hurricane season

Tropical Storm Alberto was a tropical cyclone that produced extensive and destructive flooding over portions of Alabama, Georgia, and Florida in July 1994. The first named storm of the annual hurricane season, Alberto developed from a tropical wave over the northwestern Caribbean Sea on June 30. Initially a tropical depression, the system moved westward, before curving northwestward on July 1 and entering the Gulf of Mexico. Early on the following day, the depression intensified into Tropical Storm Alberto. Alberto strengthened steadily over the Gulf of Mexico, and by midday on July 3, it peaked as a strong tropical storm with maximum sustained winds of 65 mph (100 km/h). A few hours later, the cyclone made landfall near Destin, Florida, at the same intensity. The system quickly weakened to a tropical depression early on July 4. Thereafter, a high pressure system caused Alberto to drift over west-central Georgia and central Alabama, until the storm dissipated over Alabama on July 7.

In its early and precursor stages, Alberto produced about 10 in (250 mm) of precipitation on Cuba's Isla de la Juventud. Striking the Florida Panhandle as a strong tropical storm, the cyclone caused some erosion and wind damage. Additionally, freshwater flooding forced about 3,000 people to flee their homes. Damage in Florida totaled about $80 million. The storm generated heavy precipitation over much of southeastern Alabama. Floodwaters entered hundreds of homes each in Coffee, Dale, Geneva, Henry, and Houston counties. Georgia experienced the worst effects from the storm. Up to 27.85 in (707 mm) of rain fell near Americus. Flooding resulted in the closure of approximately 1,000 bridges, while about 471,000 acres (191,000 ha) of croplands were inundated in Georgia alone. Throughout Alabama, Georgia, and Florida, approximately 18,000 businesses and homes suffered damage or destruction. Alberto was responsible for $1.03 billion in damages (1994 USD) and 33 deaths. Other sources, however, place the damage total from $1.5 billion to almost $2 billion and the death toll closer to 38 people.

== Meteorological history ==
Map plotting the storm's track and intensity, according to the Saffir–Simpson scale Map key Saffir–Simpson scale Tropical depression (≤38 mph, ≤62 km/h) Tropical storm (39–73 mph, 63–118 km/h) Category 1 (74–95 mph, 119–153 km/h) Category 2 (96–110 mph, 154–177 km/h) Category 3 (111–129 mph, 178–208 km/h) Category 4 (130–156 mph, 209–251 km/h) Category 5 (≥157 mph, ≥252 km/h) Unknown Storm type Tropical cyclone Subtropical cyclone Extratropical cyclone, remnant low, tropical disturbance, or monsoon depression

On June 18, radiosonde data from Dakar, Senegal, indicated that a tropical wave emerged into the Atlantic from the west coast of Africa. The wave moved westward for several days, with an associated area of low clouds. Little deep convection developed until June 26, when the wave was situated in just north of Puerto Rico and the Virgin Islands. However, strong wind shear diminished a significant amount of convection while the system crossed the Bahamas on June 28. After crossing Cuba and emerging into the Caribbean Sea by the following day, deep convection quickly redeveloped and became more concentrated as the wave encountered only light vertical wind shear. A reconnaissance aircraft flight into the system on June 30 detected a well-defined circulation. As a result, Tropical Depression One developed just west of Isla de la Juventud at 06:00 UTC. Initially, the depression moved westward at about 8 mph (13 km/h). However, a low aloft centered over the south-central Gulf of Mexico and a mid-latitude short-wave trough moving eastward across the northern gulf caused the depression to curve northwestward on July 1.

Early on July 2, a reconnaissance aircraft flight into the cyclone indicated that it had intensified into a tropical storm, which was assigned the name Alberto. Later that day, Alberto accelerated somewhat in a northerly direction due to another short-wave trough approaching the central Gulf Coast of the United States, with the storm's forward speed increasing to about 14 mph (23 km/h). Although the system previously had a rather poor appearance on satellite imagery, the center of circulation became more embedded within the deep convection. At 12:00 UTC on July 3, Alberto attained its peak intensity with maximum sustained winds of 65 mph (100 km/h) and a minimum barometric pressure of 993 mbar (29.3 inHg). About three hours later, the cyclone made landfall near Destin, Florida, at the same intensity. As the storm moved inland, satellite imagery detected hints of a developing eye feature. However, Alberto rapidly weakened, falling to tropical depression intensity by 00:00 UTC on July 4. After bypassing the short-wave trough, the cyclone's forward progress became blocked by a building high pressure area. As a result, Alberto began drifting over Georgia, executing a small cyclonic loop before entering Alabama. Although having turned very weak, the depression remained a tropical cyclone until its circulation dissipated over Alabama late on July 7.

== Preparations ==
On June 30, on the day of Alberto's formation, a tropical storm warning was issued from Puerto Juárez to Mérida, Mexico; the warning was discontinued on July 1. In the United States, a tropical storm watch was posted on July 2 for locations between Sabine Pass, Texas and Pensacola, Florida. The watch was subsequently upgraded to a tropical storm warning from Gulfport, Mississippi, to Cedar Key, Florida; it was soon altered to a hurricane warning. Later on July 3, the hurricane warning was discontinued and replaced with a tropical storm warning, which was lifted at 2100 UTC.

On the Florida Panhandle, residents boarded up windows in anticipation of what was to be a "fury". At gasoline stations, unusually long lines formed, and local stores did increased business in selling emergency supplies. Thousands of tourists along the coast left the region; a local deputy was quoted as estimating that 10,000 people checked out of their hotels early. On Okaloosa Island and Holiday Isle, ground-floor house and businesses were forced to evacuate. Civil-defense authorities evacuated residents from low-lying locations. Then-Governor of Florida, Lawton Chiles, declared a State of emergency for parts of the state, and advised residents along the coast to monitor updates regarding the storm. Over 3,000 people sought refuge in Red Cross shelters along the coast of Florida, westward into parts of Alabama.

== Impact ==
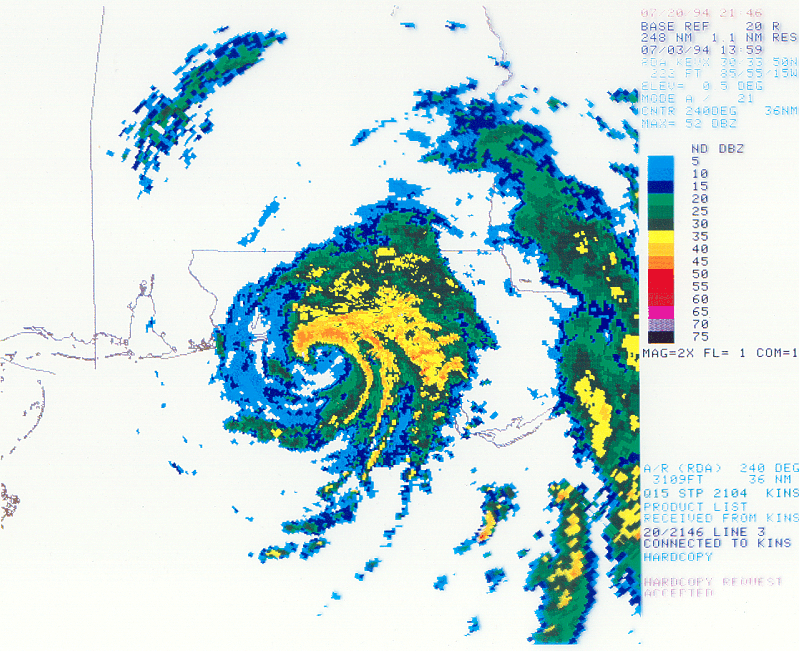
Radar image of Alberto at landfall

Upon forming, the storm dropped heavy rainfall over parts of Cuba, peaking at 10 inches (250 mm).

In the United States, Alberto produced heavy rainfall over the Florida Panhandle, southeastern Alabama, and central and southwest Georgia. Within the three states combined, floodwaters impacted more than 900,000 acres (360,000 ha) of crops. The storm damaged or destroyed approximately 18,000 homes and damaged more than 1,000 roads and 218 dams, many of which failed. Flooding also prompted about 50,000 people to flee their homes. Throughout the United States, Alberto caused about $1.03 billion in damage. A total of 33 deaths occurred, 31 in Georgia and 2 in Alabama.

=== Florida ===
At Destin, Florida, sustained winds blew at 63 mph (101 km/h), while winds gusted to 75 mph (121 km/h); however, there was an unofficial report of 89 mph (143 km/h) gusts. There, barometric pressure fell to 993 mbar (29.3 inHg) in association with Alberto. Storm tides of 5 ft (1.5 m) was estimated along the coast of Destin, while tides reached 3 ft (0.91 m) at Panama City. At St. George Island, wind gusts reached 58 mph (93 km/h). Beach erosion and tidal flooding occurred along the coast. Throughout northwest Florida, 5 in (130 mm) of rain fell, with totals as high as 21.57 in (548 mm). Other precipitation accumulations include 13.25 in (337 mm) at Caryville.

Along the coast, damage was limited to sea walls, piers and boats, and roof damage to some beachfront motels. As the storm progressed inland, it brought down signs, billboards, trees and powerlines, and triggered moderate flooding; about 18,500 customers lost electric power. As a weakened tropical depression, the remnants of Alberto dropped extensive rainfall throughout the region. As heavy rain fell to the north, tremendous volumes of water moved down major river systems into the Florida Panhandle. As a result, there was extensive river flooding that exceeded 100-year events in some locations, particularly along the Apalachicola and Chipola Rivers. The Apalachicola remained above flood stage until August, although in localized areas, flooding persisted until September due to Tropical Storm Beryl. A total of 300,000 chickens and 125 cattle and hogs were lost within the state, and offshore, 90% of the oysters in Apalachicola Bay were lost. The flooding was severe, inflicting $40 million (1994 USD) in damage to infrastructure, $14 million in insured damage, and $25 million in agricultural losses.

=== Georgia ===
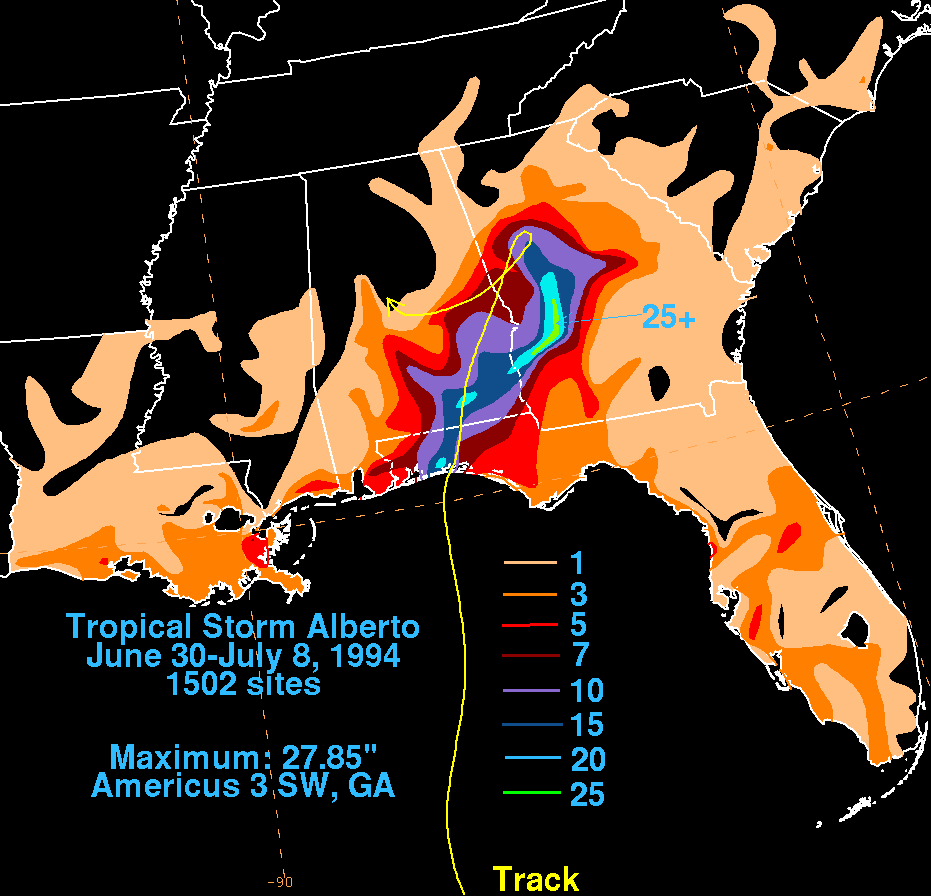
Rainfall associated with Tropical Storm Alberto

In Georgia, rainfall from the tropical cyclone peaked at 27.85 in (707 mm) near Americus. Due to a previously stalled cold front, which subsequently caused Alberto to remain stationary, the ground was already saturated with rainfall. Virtually all of the precipitation became instant runoff into streams and rivers. Peak discharges along the Flint and Ocmulgee rivers exceeded 100-year flood levels. At least 100 dams and recreational watersheds suffered severe damage or were destroyed. Many roads were inundated, forcing the closure of 175 roads and 1,000 bridges. Damage to highway infrastructure exceeded $130 million.

Approximately 471,000 acres (191,000 ha) of croplands were submerged, causing about $100 million in damage to agriculture. Fifteen of the United States Geological Survey's (USGS) gaging stations were severely damaged or demolished, forcing data to be collected manually and reported by cellphone. Due to flooded water systems, approximately 500,000 people were temporarily left without drinking water. There were 31 deaths in the state, most of which from cars being swept onto flooded roads or into swollen creeks. With $750 million in damage, Alberto was considered the costliest tropical cyclone in Georgia, until Hurricane Michael in 2018 then later Hurricane Helene in 2024. The flooding was considered the worst in the history of the state.

==== Southwest Georgia ====
Along the state line with Florida, five counties in southwestern Georgia reported 3 to 5 in (76 to 127 mm) of precipitation. In Bainbridge, the rising Flint River caused 300 residents to evacuate. Although the river crested about 7 ft (2.1 m) lower than initially predicted, flooding moderately or severely damaged approximately 300 homes in Bainbridge, as well as more than a dozen businesses. A local fertilizer plant was also threatened by the swollen Flint River. In the five counties of Brooks, Colquitt, Cook, Thomas, and Worth, the Little and Ochlockonee rivers overflowed their banks, flooding adjacent areas. In Early and Miller counties, 7 to 10 in (180 to 250 mm) of rain fell between July 3 and July 7, while an additional 3 to 7 in (76 to 178 mm) of precipitation was observed from July 10 to July 14. Many low-lying areas were flooded. Seven families were evacuated from their homes in Safford due to flooding. Further north, the Flint River also overflow its banks in Baker and Mitchell counties. Extensive flooding occurred in Newton, with more than $100,000 in property damage. Widespread inundation of crops were reported in both counties.

In Dougherty County, the Flint River exceeded its banks, forcing over 20,000 residents to evacuate. Five deaths were reported in the county, with four people drowning in the river and another from a woman being trapped in her home for several days. The city of Albany was cut in half by the flooding, and hundreds of caskets were disinterred and floated away, sometimes disintegrating into the water. Several locations along State Route 37 flooded in Fort Gaines, a city in Clay County. To the north in Randolph County, Cuthbert recorded 23.85 in (606 mm) of rainfall during a 5-day period. Many streets in the city were flooded, including two portions of U.S. Route 82 and a part of State Route 266. In Terrell County, the sheriff's department reported that many roads were inundated due to swollen creeks and streams. A number of homes and businesses suffered an extensive impact, with up to several million dollars in many. A woman was killed in Dawson after her car was swept off the road into Chickasawhatchee River.

Numerous county roads were flooded in Lee County due to swollen streams and creeks. Over 600 people were evacuated from their homes county-wide after rising waters began to flood residential areas. In Webster County, many roads were inundated due to the flooding of streams and creeks. About 1 to 5 in (25 to 127 mm) of precipitation fell in Dodge, Pulaski, Wilcox counties, inundating croplands along the Ocmulgee River. Extensive flooding was reported in much of Dooly County. Several bridges washed out and many roads were closed, including State Route 27 near Drayton. Some residential areas were flooded, resulting in evacuations. In Crisp County, a portion of Interstate 75 was closed due to flooding. A subdivision was evacuated, as well as areas around Lake Blackshear.

In Americus, flood waters threatened 21,000 acres (8,500 ha) of peanuts and other crops such as cotton and corn, while numerous streets, businesses, and homes were inundated. Nine people died after cars washed off of inundated roads. Two other fatalities occurred after flood waters destroyed a home on Lake Jackson and another after a mobile home was swept away. In Plains, 22.8 inches (580 mm) of rainfall was observed. Several homes and businesses were inundated. A tractor trailer on U.S. Route 280 washed away, killing the three male occupants of the vehicle. Additionally, flood waters approached the home of former President of the United States Jimmy Carter, but no damage occurred. Standing water also covered numerous roads in Leslie. On Lake Corinth, a 17‑year‑old boy attempted to fix a downed telephone line, but failed and died after his boat capsized.

==== Central Georgia ====
For a time, the city of Macon was completely cut off by flood waters severing all roads in and out of the city. Most of the city lost all water service during the height of flood when two major treatment plants were flooded. It took almost three weeks before service was restored. The city of Montezuma was the hardest hit of all when the flood levee was topped by the nearby Flint River. The entire downtown area was inundated with up to 18 feet of water. Cleanup would take months to complete.

In Columbus, 3.5 in (89 mm) of precipitation was observed in 24 hours, while 5.72 in (145 mm) of rain fell throughout a 4-day period. Police reported that numerous streets were flooded, including a cave-in caused by runoff. Three homes in West Point were evacuated.

Several people in Taylor County reported seeing a funnel cloud. Thunderstorm winds damaged some buildings and mobile homes. One woman suffered minor injuries.

==== North Georgia and Atlanta metropolitan area ====
Flooding also occurred in portions of the Atlanta metropolitan area. In Heard County, the city of Franklin recorded 6.13 in (156 mm) of precipitation. Portions of State Route 34 were inundated with up to 2 ft (0.61 m) of water. To the east in Coweta County, 6 to 8 in (150 to 200 mm) of rain fell. Two mobile home parks were flooded. Water also inundated Interstate 85 at exit 11. The storm also dropped heavy precipitation in Meriwether County, including 2 in (51 mm) of rain in less than an hour. The resultant flash flood forced the evacuation of two homes and the closure of seven roads, while one bridge was washed out. A thunderstorm in Pike County on July 4 generated wind gusts exceeding 55 mph (89 km/h), downing a number of trees and power lines and damaging homes and historical buildings in Zebulon. A thunderstorm on the following day produced downburst winds, which damaged a few office buildings, ripped off portions of a church roof, and downed more trees in the city. In Spalding County, 14.30 in (363 mm) of precipitation was observed at Griffin. Many homes and businesses were flooded and several earthen dams failed. A woman died when her car ran into a washed out road; two others were injured in the same location.

About 9–13 in (230–330 mm) of rain fell in Butts County. Several roads were inundated by flood waters and a number of culverts and drainage systems that collapsed due to excessive water; a total of 20 roads were closed. Seventy to eighty families in the county were evacuated. At Indian Springs State Park, water overflowed the dams, flooding the park with up to 3 ft (0.91 m) of water. In Henry County, flooding resulted in the closure of about forty roads – including Interstate 75 from Jodeco Road to State Route 20 – with only five or six reopened by a week after the storm began impacting the area. Damage to roads and bridges in the county totaled approximately $500,000. An estimated 25% of crops across Henry County sustained damage, with about 10,000 acres (4,000 ha) of farmlands inundated with water. Additionally, the water authority suffered about $1.2 million in damage. Two deaths occurred in Henry County, both from separate drowning incidents in the Towaliga River.

In Clayton County, rising waterways forced the evacuation of nearly 500 people in the Jonesboro area, including about 200 people at an apartment complex along Sullivan Creek, a tributary of the Flint River. The creek overflowed its banks by roughly 8 ft (2.4 m), with water entering 75 first-floor apartments. Numerous other dwellings in the county were destroyed. Flooding resulted in the closure of seven roads and the collapse of several bridges. Damage to roads and bridges in the county reached approximately $250,000. The water plant suffered about $900,000 in damage, causing it to be shut down. Rainfall totals between 4 and 7 in (100 and 180 mm) flooded numerous culverts, houses, and roads in Rockdale County. Additionally, a 16‑year‑old girl drowned after attempting to rescue a dog. At the Hartsfield–Jackson Atlanta International Airport in Atlanta, 7.05 in (179 mm) of rain was recorded, forcing many to evacuate flooded apartments in nearby College Park. Another person died in a DeKalb County due to a car accident caused by slick roads.

=== Alabama ===
Coastal Alabama experienced only minor impacts due to Alberto. The region only recorded wind gusts up to 33 mph (53 km/h) at Dauphin Island, while the National Weather Service office in Mobile noted "the western most rainshield and banded convection associated with T.S. Alberto remained just to the east". To the northeast, however, the cyclone dropped heavy precipitation across the southeastern part of the state, peaking at 22.63 in (575 mm) of rain near Enterprise. Consequently, extensive flooding occurred along waterways such as the Catoma Creek, Choctawhatchee River, Conecuh River, Murder Creek, Pea River, Tallapoosa River. Drainage systems, bridges, and roadways, especially sustained significant impacts, with many road closures in southern Alabama. Two deaths were reported in Alabama, both due to indirect causes, one in Geneva County and the other in Houston County.

In Covington and Houston counties, high winds caused some structural damage and downed many trees. Heavy rains in the latter damaged approximately 185 homes and destroyed numerous mobile homes, while sweeping away or damaging 20 bridges. At least 319 homes were impacted by flooding in Geneva County, more than 100 demolished and 79 substantially damaged. More than 2,500 people fled their homes. In Coffee County, 200-300 residences suffered water damage, while 3,000-4,000 people evacuated due to flooding. Dale County reported the destruction 20 homes, major damage to 20 others, and minor damage to 25 homes. Additionally, the storm demolished approximately 100 mobile homes and damaged around 100 others. In Henry County, roughly 100 homes sustained water damage.

== Aftermath ==
Because of the severe flooding in the state of Georgia, governor Zell Miller declared 55 counties in a state of emergency, which included the following counties in central Georgia: Bibb, Butts, Crawford, Dooly, Houston, Jones, Lamar, Macon, Monroe, Peach, Sumter, Taylor, Twiggs, and Upson.

== See also ==
- Other storms of the same name
- List of wettest tropical cyclones in the United States
- List of floods
- List of Florida hurricanes (1975–1999)
- Timeline of the 1994 Atlantic hurricane season
