= Hurricane Zeta =

Category 3 Atlantic hurricane in 2020

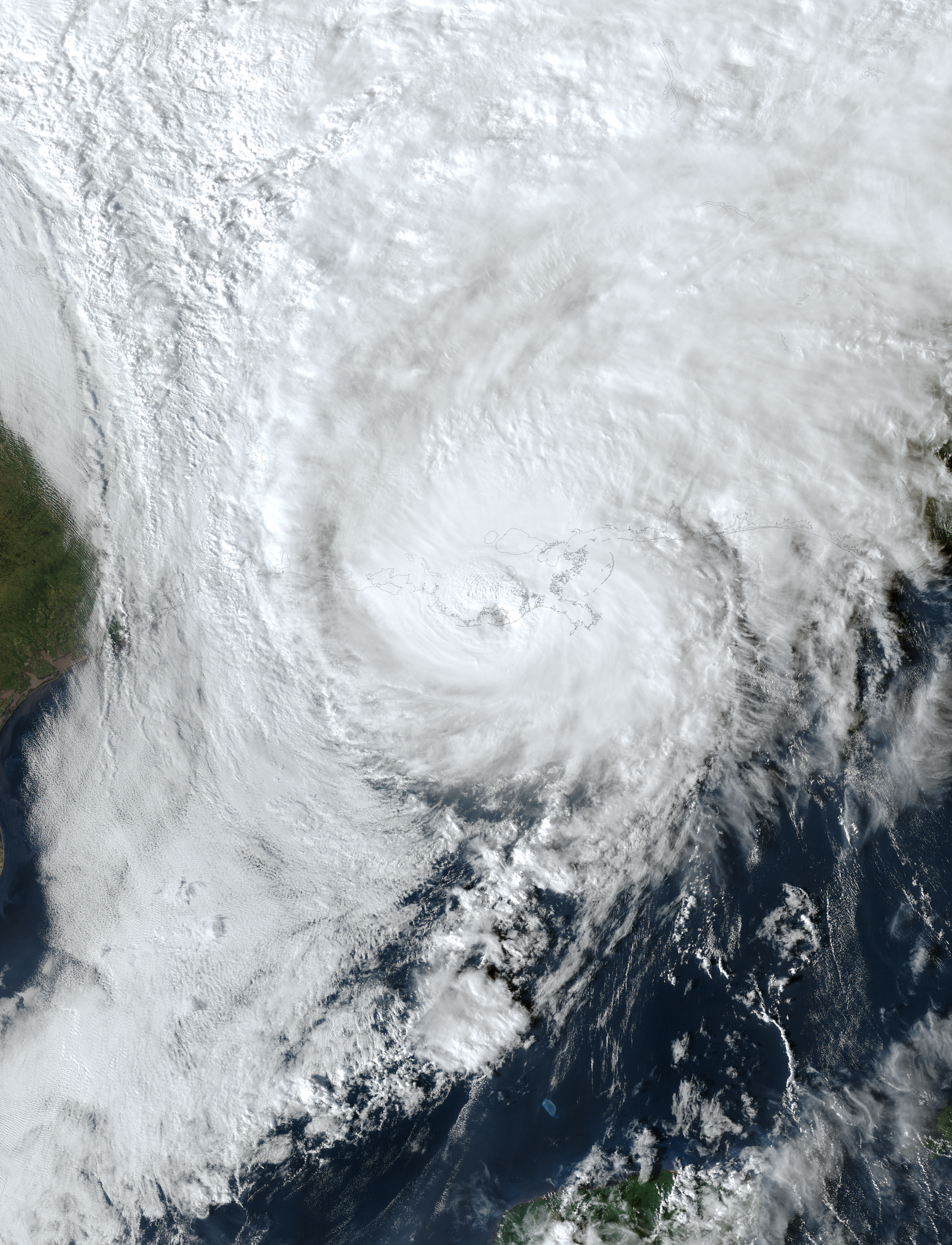
- Hurricane Zeta at peak intensity while making landfall in southeast Louisiana on October 28

Meteorological history
- Formed: October 24, 2020
- Post-tropical: October 29, 2020
- Dissipated: October 30, 2020

Category 3 major hurricane
- 1-minute sustained (SSHWS/NWS)
- Highest winds: 115 mph (185 km/h)
- Lowest pressure: 970 mbar (hPa); 28.64 inHg

Overall effects
- Fatalities: 9 total
- Damage: $4.4 billion (2020 USD)
- Areas affected: Cayman Islands, Jamaica, Central America, Yucatán Peninsula, Gulf Coast of the United States, Southeastern United States, Mid-Atlantic, New England, Ireland, United Kingdom
- IBTrACS /
- Part of the 2020 Atlantic hurricane and 2020–21 North American winter seasons

Hurricane Zeta was a late-season tropical cyclone in 2020 that made landfall on the Yucatán Peninsula and then in southeastern Louisiana, the latest on record to do so at such strength in the United States. Zeta was the record-tying sixth hurricane of the year to make landfall in the United States. The twenty-seventh named storm, twelfth hurricane and fifth major hurricane of the extremely active 2020 Atlantic hurricane season, Zeta formed from a broad area of low pressure that formed in the western Caribbean Sea on October 19. After battling wind shear, the quasi-stationary low organized into Tropical Depression Twenty-Eight on October 24. The system strengthened into Tropical Storm Zeta early on October 25 before becoming a hurricane the next day as it began to move northwestward. Hurricane Zeta made landfall on the Yucatán Peninsula late on October 26 and weakened while inland to a tropical storm, before moving off the northern coast of the peninsula on October 27. After weakening due to dry air entrainment, Zeta reorganized and became a hurricane again, and eventually a Category 2 hurricane, as it turned northeastward approaching the United States Gulf Coast on October 28. It continued to strengthen until it reached its peak intensity as a major Category 3 hurricane with 115-mile-per-hour (185 km/h) sustained winds and a minimum pressure of 970 mbar (28.64 inHg) as it made landfall at Cocodrie, Louisiana, that evening. Zeta continued on through Mississippi and parts of Alabama with hurricane-force winds. Zeta gradually weakened as it accelerated northeastward, and became post-tropical on October 29, as it moved through central Virginia, dissipating shortly afterwards off the coast of New Jersey. After bringing accumulating snow to parts of New England, the extratropical low-pressure system carrying Zeta's remnant energy impacted the United Kingdom on November 1 and 2.

Numerous tropical cyclone watches and warnings were issued in areas that had already dealt with other tropical cyclones throughout the season, including Hurricane Delta, which took a near-identical track three weeks prior. States of emergencies were issued in Louisiana, Mississippi, and Alabama. Heavy rain in Jamaica led to a landslide that killed a man and his daughter when it hit their family home on October 24. In Mexico, strong winds and storm surge knocked down tree branches onto flooded streets in Playa del Carmen, Quintana Roo, near where Zeta made landfall. Heavy rain, storm surge, and strong winds also impacted the Southeastern United States and at least six fatalities were confirmed in the region. Downed power lines and numerous crashes were a result in New England after the remnants of the system brought heavy accumulating snow to parts of the region. Overall, Zeta caused at least $4.415 billion in damage throughout its path: $4.4 billion in the United States and at least $15 million in the Caribbean.

== Meteorological history ==
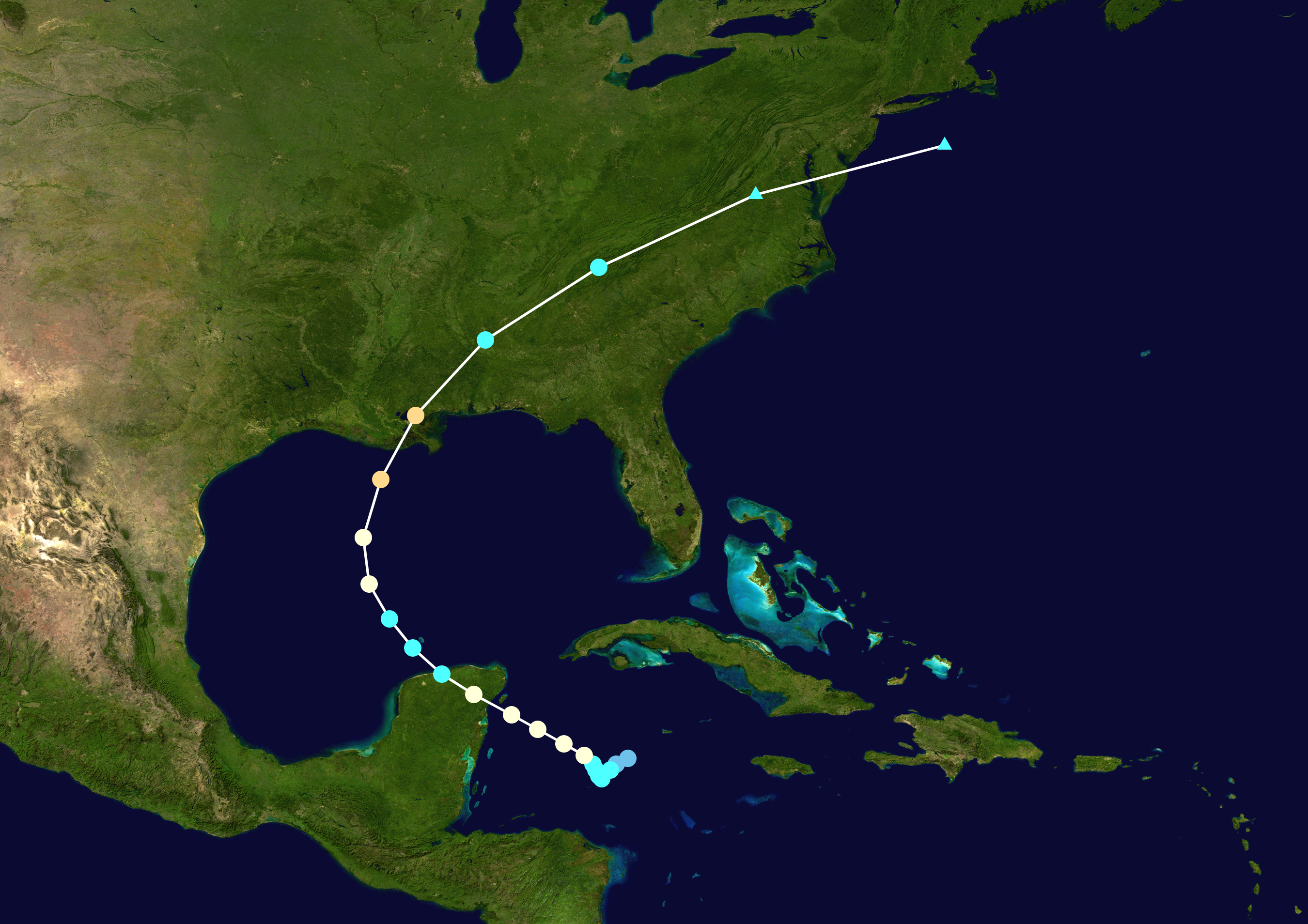
Map plotting the storm's track and intensity, according to the Saffir–Simpson scale (Note: The position of Zeta's Category 3 peak is not depicted in this graphic as it is an asynoptic point (i.e. not at the 6-hour intervals of all other points) occurring at 21:00 UTC October 28, the time of Louisiana landfall.) Map key Saffir–Simpson scale Tropical depression (≤38 mph, ≤62 km/h) Tropical storm (39–73 mph, 63–118 km/h) Category 1 (74–95 mph, 119–153 km/h) Category 2 (96–110 mph, 154–177 km/h) Category 3 (111–129 mph, 178–208 km/h) Category 4 (130–156 mph, 209–251 km/h) Category 5 (≥157 mph, ≥252 km/h) Unknown Storm type Tropical cyclone Subtropical cyclone Extratropical cyclone, remnant low, tropical disturbance, or monsoon depression

At 00:00 UTC on October 15, the National Hurricane Center (NHC) began to monitor the southern Caribbean Sea for the possible development of a broad area of low pressure over the region. A large area of unsettled weather developed over the southwestern Caribbean by October 19 due to the combination of a tropical wave and a trough of low pressure. Although unfavorable upper-level winds prevented further development of the tropical wave, southerly flow from that system caused Zeta's precursor trough to drift northward. Three days later, satellite images and radar data showed that the system, located near Grand Cayman Island at the time, was gradually becoming better organized. Following an increase of deep convection overnight into the morning of October 24, satellite data indicated that a well-defined low formed by 12:00 UTC October 24, marking the formation of Tropical Depression Twenty-Eight. Then, 12 hours later, the depression strengthened into Tropical Storm Zeta, while located about 270 mi (430 km) east-southeast of Cozumel, Quintana Roo. After remaining nearly stationary for over a day, the storm began to move northwestward, and, despite experiencing some north-northwestwardly wind shear, Zeta steadily intensified, reaching hurricane strength by 06:00 UTC on October 26, while located about 230 mi (370 km) southeast of Cozumel. At 03:55 UTC the next day, the hurricane made its first landfall near Ciudad Chemuyil, Quintana Roo with sustained winds of 85 mph (135 km/h). It weakened to a tropical storm over the Yucatán Peninsula, and moved offshore of the northern coast of the peninsula by 15:00 UTC, about 25 mi (40 km) north-northeast of Progreso, Yucatán.

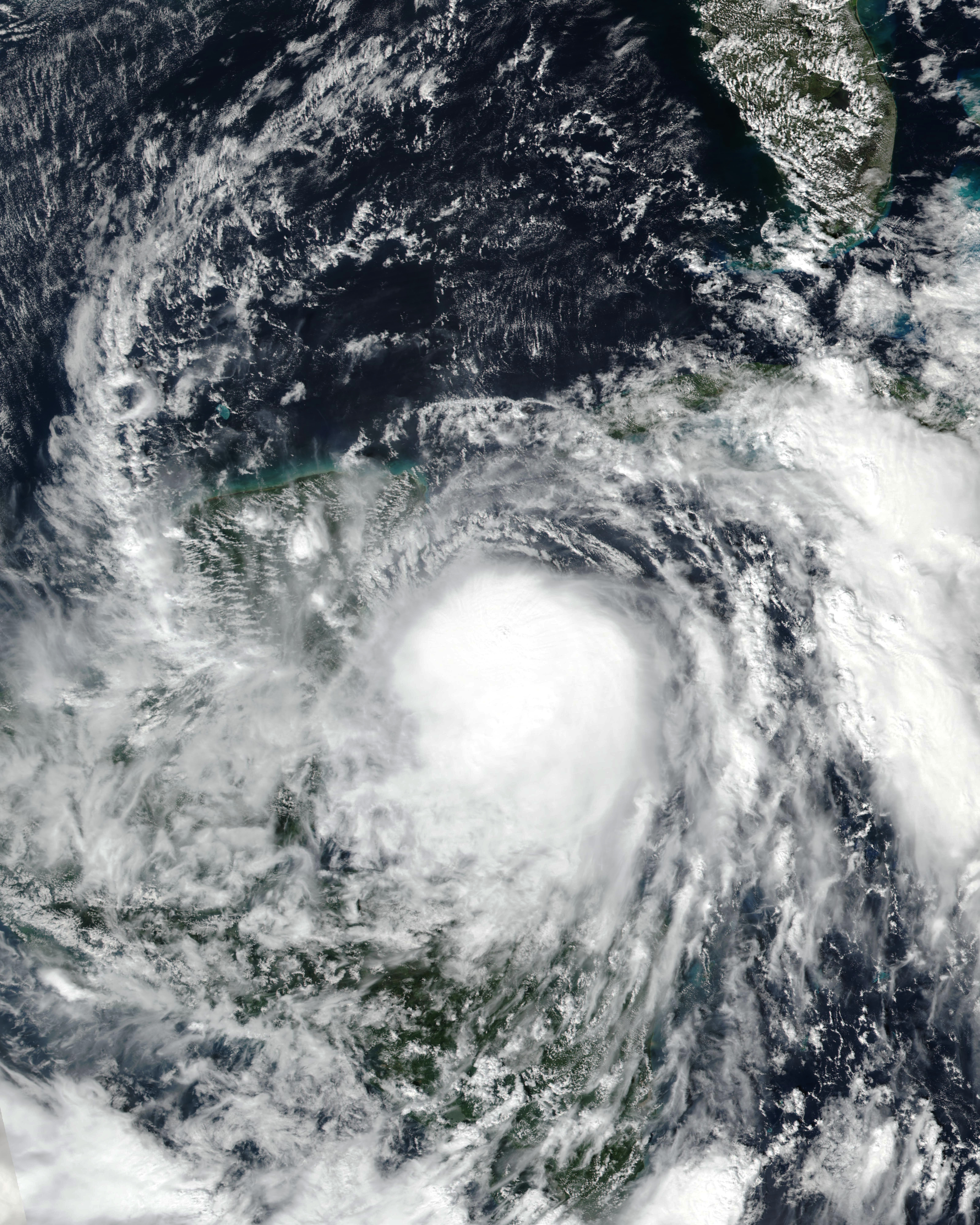
Hurricane Zeta approaching the Yucatán Peninsula on October 26

Dry air wrapped around the northern half of Zeta's circulation as it moved off shore over the southern Gulf of Mexico, leaving its center partially exposed, though it began to re-intensify on October 28, in a conducive environment of low shear and warm sea surface temperatures. At 06:00 UTC on October 28, while located about 410 mi (660 km) south of New Orleans, Louisiana, Zeta became a hurricane again. It then began to accelerate, turning towards the northeast because of an approaching upper-level low and associated cold front moving across the Southern Plains while ridging was located off the Southeast Atlantic U.S. Coast. While within the swift flow between these systems, Zeta rapidly intensified as it moved quickly, with a forward speed of (25–30 mph (40–48 km/h), toward the Louisiana coast. Despite marginal sea-surface temperatures and increasing wind shear, the storm's velocity kept it from weakening. It continued to strengthen until it reached its peak intensity, as a category 3 hurricane, with sustained winds of 115 mph (185 km/h) and a minimum barometric pressure of 970 mbar (29 inHg), as it made landfall near Cocodrie, Louisiana, at 21:00 UTC. Operationally, the National Hurricane Center analyzed the storm to be at high-end category 2 strength at landfall, but it was upgraded to a category 3 in post season analysis. The storm began to gradually weaken as it moved directly over New Orleans and then into southern Mississippi. Its maximum sustained winds decreased to tropical storm strength early on October 29, about 25 mi (40 km) south-southeast of Tuscaloosa, Alabama. It then accelerated northeastward across northern Georgia and the southern Appalachian Mountains, before transitioning into a post-tropical cyclone about 25 mi (40 km) south-southeast of Charlottesville, Virginia. The system continued moving rapidly northeastward overnight on October 29–30, becoming entwined with a frontal zone and bringing accumulating snow to parts of New England, before dissipating east of the mid-Atlantic U.S. coast on October 30. Several days later, the low-pressure system carrying Zeta's remnant energy brought heavy rain and strong winds to parts of the United Kingdom.

== Preparations ==
=== Cayman Islands and Jamaica ===
Flash flood warnings were issued in parts of Jamaica and the Cayman Islands, where a small craft warning was also issued in the latter.

=== Cuba ===
Upon formation, a Tropical Storm Watch was issued for the province of Pinar del Río. This was upgraded to a warning soon after. However, the storm went a bit further south than expected, and no significant impacts were felt there.

=== Mexico ===
In Quintana Roo, people were still recovering from Hurricane Delta, which hit the region about three weeks prior. The state government set up several shelters for residents and tourists, while transport was suspended. Some boats that usually carry tourists anchored among mangroves to avoid the waves and winds of Hurricane Zeta.

=== United States ===
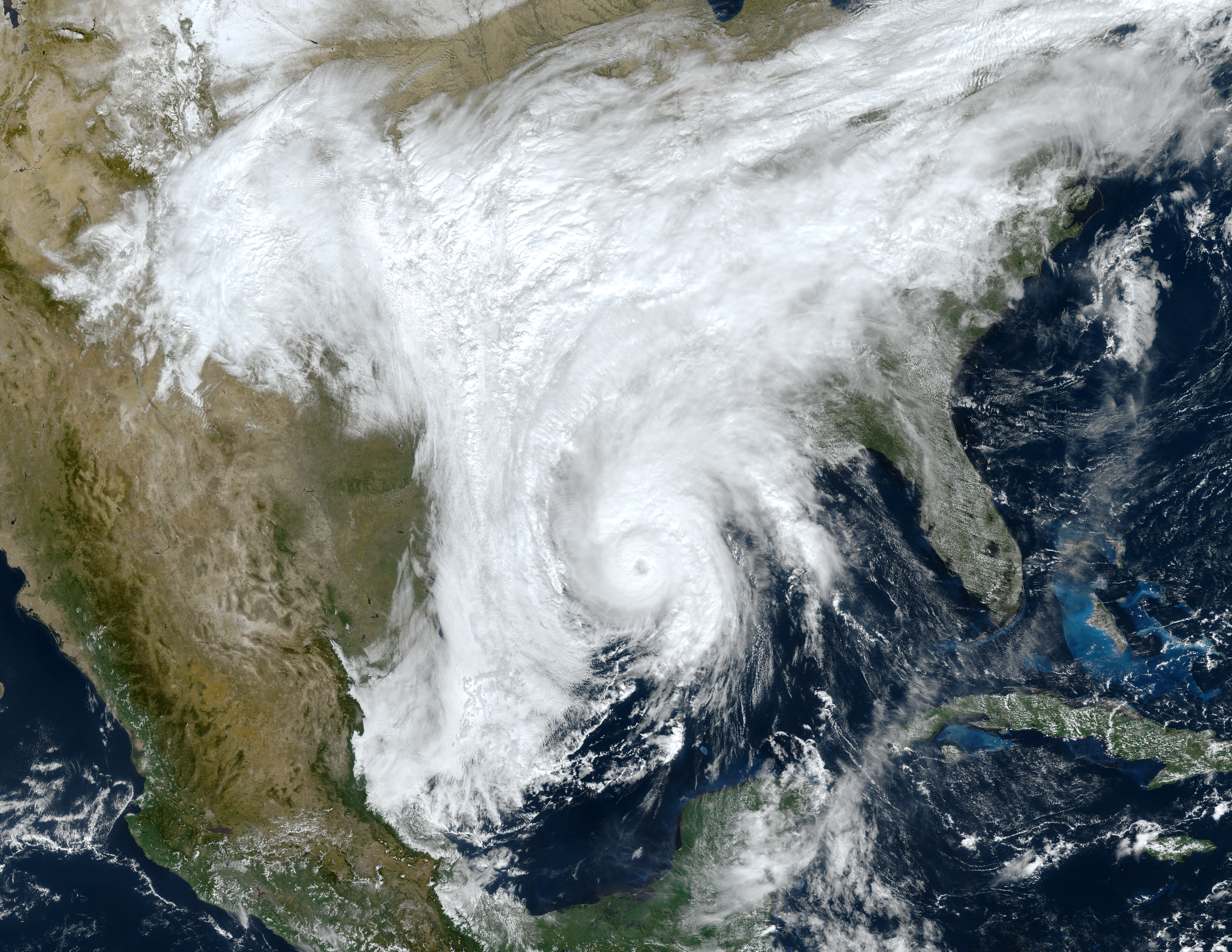
GOES-16 imagery of Hurricane Zeta and the Southern Plains winter storm interacting on October 28

Hurricane watches were issued for eastern and central coastal Louisiana and coastal Mississippi. A tropical storm watch was also issued for areas east of Intracoastal City to Morgan City, Louisiana, as well as coastal Alabama. Storm surge watches were issued for the entire area as well. The western part of watches and warnings were trimmed as the storm approached and the forecast track became better established. Inland tropical storm warnings were issued as far north as southern Virginia. Two tornado watches were ultimately issued for this storm; they stretched from southeast Louisiana into southwestern Georgia. As the storm began to merge with a cold front, winter weather advisories were issued for inland New England with the threat of accumulating snow causing problems on roads.

==== Louisiana ====
On October 26, Louisiana Governor John Bel Edwards issued a state of emergency for the entire state. The town of Grand Isle issued a mandatory evacuation on October 27 as a voluntary evacuation was ordered for Jean Lafitte that same day. Tulane University moved classes to virtual learning on October 28, while also closing health centers on campus. Cleco employed more than 200 new workers to help restore power in the aftermath of Zeta. Several national park units were shut down to weather the storm.

==== Mississippi ====
Mississippi Governor Tate Reeves declared a state of emergency ahead of Zeta on October 28. This was preceded by Hattiesburg and Forrest County's emergency declarations which were issued on October 27. Schools in Pascagoula, Gautier, Biloxi, and Long Beach were closed on October 28 and 29 although schools in Pascagoula and Gautier only had early releases on October 28. On October 26, the entire Mississippi section of the Gulf Islands National Seashore shut down in preparation of the hurricane.

==== Alabama ====
On October 27, Alabama Governor Kay Ivey issued a state of emergency. Baldwin EMC stocked on supplies and put extra crews on standby ahead of Zeta to help restore power in parts of the state.

==== Elsewhere ====
In Pensacola, Florida, early voting was closed from 3 pm on October 28 to 11 am on October 29.

Tropical Storm Warnings were issued as far inland as the Carolinas and Virginia on October 28, with the likelihood of tropical-storm-force sustained winds and gusts likely in the areas.

After the storm moved offshore, the threat of blowing snow and other wintry weather in New England prompted Winter Weather Advisories for much of inland New England on October 29 and 30. The residents of the area were warned of slick roads and unsuitable driving conditions with the wintry weather.

== Impact ==
Costliest Non-retired Hurricanes
Rank	Cyclone	Season	Damage
1	Sally	2020	$7.3 billion
2	Isaias	2020	$5.02 billion
3	Imelda	2019	$5.0 billion
4	Debby	2024	$4.5 billion
5	Zeta	2020	$4.4 billion
6	Karl	2010	$3.9 billion
7	Idalia	2023	$3.6 billion
8	Isaac	2012	$3.11 billion
9	Delta	2020	$3.09 billion
10	Lee	2011	$2.8 billion

=== Cayman Islands and Jamaica ===
A man and his daughter were killed in Jamaica after a landslide hit the family's home on October 24. The landslide was due to heavy rain likely from the precursor to Zeta. The precursor of Zeta caused J$2 billion (US$13.7 million) in infrastructural damage. Later, Zeta also caused US$18 million to roads and US$13 million in agricultural losses.

=== Mexico ===
Tree branches were littered across flooded streets in Playa del Carmen, Quintana Roo, near where Zeta made landfall. However, Quintana Roo Governor Carlos Joaquin stated on Twitter that no major damage or casualties had been reported in the state. He also allowed airports and business to re-open just hours after landfall, but forced beaches to remain closed until surf calmed. Damage in Quintana Roo was relatively minor, and only reached MX$4.1 million (US$195,000).

=== United States ===
A number of tornado warnings were issued in Louisiana, Mississippi, Alabama, and Florida. Over 2 million customers in the United States lost power.

==== Louisiana ====
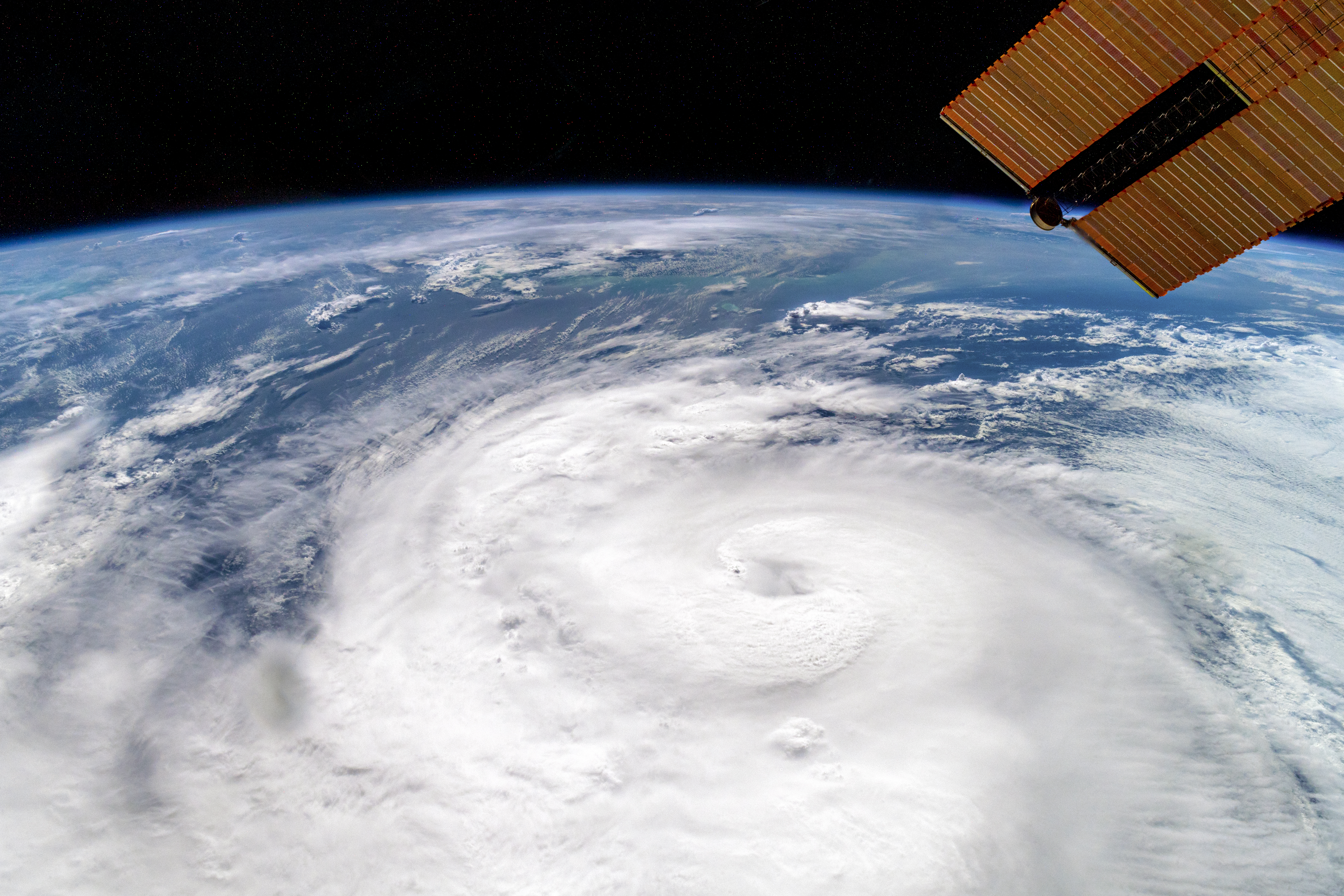
Zeta making landfall at peak intensity in Cocodrie, Louisiana as seen from the NWS New Orleans Nexrad radar and the International Space Station on October 28.

Sustained tropical storm force winds began spreading onshore in southeastern coast of Louisiana around 18:00 UTC on October 28. A sustained wind of 45 mph (72 km/h) was reported at Caillou Bay. A personal weather station at Golden Meadow reported sustained winds of 83 mph (134 km/h) with a gust to 105 mph (169 km/h) and another unofficial weather station nearby reported sustained winds of 94 mph (151 km/h) and a gust to 110 mph (180 km/h). Houma–Terrebonne Airport reported a maximum gust of 53 mph (85 km/h), while Louis Armstrong New Orleans International Airport reported a maximum gust of 71 mph (114 km/h). Lakefront Airport reported a minimum pressure of 973 mbar as the eye moved overhead. A WeatherFlow station in Harahan reported sustained winds of 56 mph (90 km/h) and a gust to 75 mph (121 km/h) while an elevated station at Bayou Bienvenue south-southeast of New Orleans reported sustained winds of 88 mph (142 km/h) and a gust to 112 mph (180 km/h). Shell Beach reported sustained winds of 81 mph (130 km/h) with a gust to 101 mph (163 km/h). Rainfall in Louisiana peaked at 7.35 in (187 mm) in Pearl River.

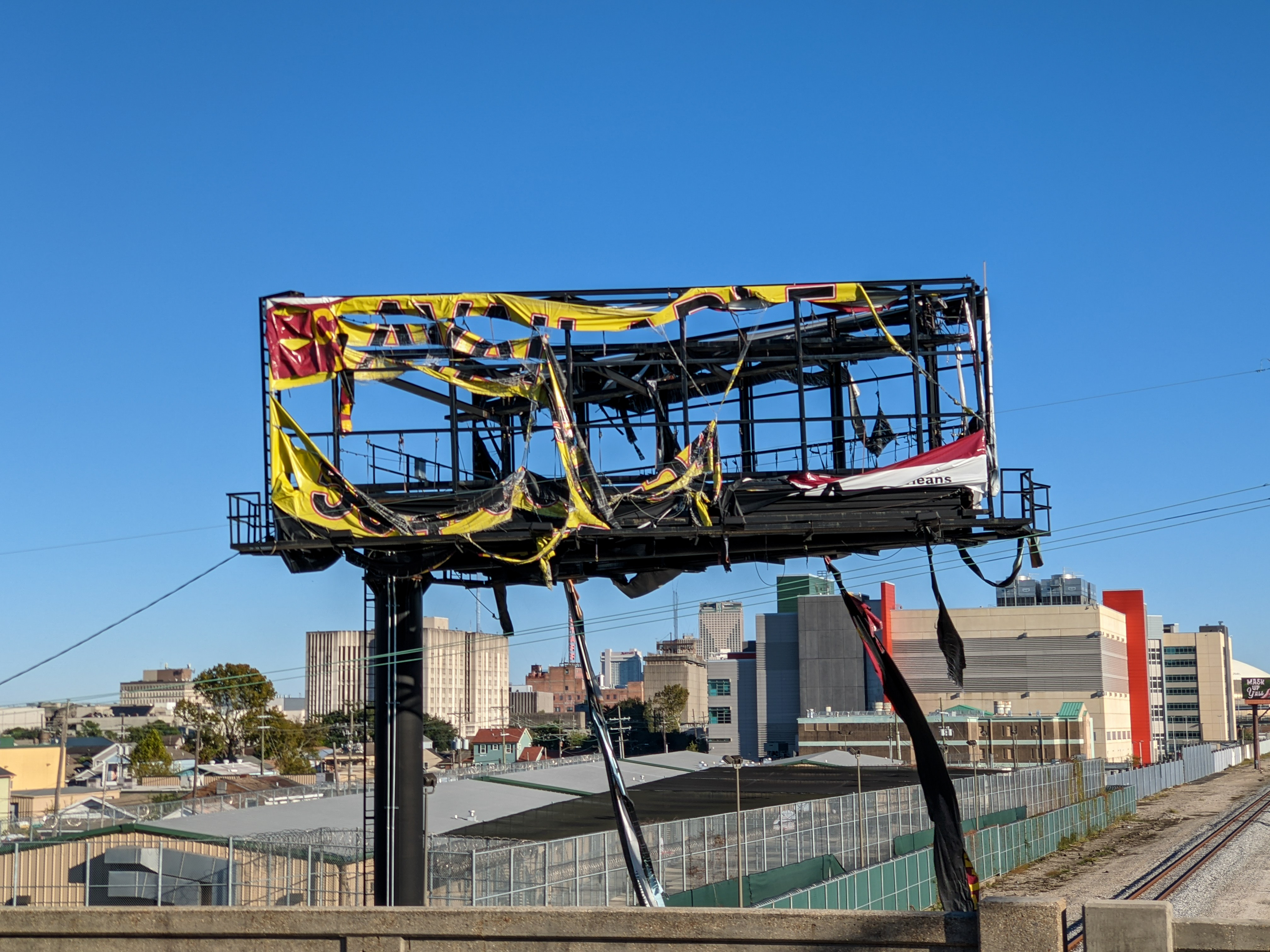
Billboard damaged by Hurricane Zeta, New Orleans, Louisiana

A gas station was damaged in Grand Isle and a tree fell on a home in Chauvin. Numerous utility lines were downed in Houma and storm surge flooded LA 1 in Golden Meadow while also depositing a boat on it. Strong winds caused widespread damage across New Orleans, with trees and power lines down throughout the parish. 440 buildings suffered minor damage, while another 10 suffered major damage. One person was hospitalized after a roof collapsed on a building in the city, and another person was also killed due to electrocution from downed power lines. Overall, Zeta caused $1.25 billion damage in Louisiana.

==== Mississippi ====
Bay St. Louis experienced maximum sustained winds of 80 mph with gusts to 103 mph at approximately 7:00 pm local time. This was followed shortly after by peak storm surge recorded at 9.99 ft (3.04 m). The only tornado reported while Zeta was a tropical cyclone occurred in Noxubee County on October 28. It was rated EF1 (on the Enhanced Fujita Scale) and caused about $30,000 in damage. The storm surge flooded the parking garage at the Golden Nugget Casino in Biloxi, leaving several cars partially submerged. Wind gusts of near 60 mph (95 km/h) were reported in Forrest County. Trees were blown down in eastern Marion County and in Lamar County south of U.S. 98. Additionally, there were sporadic reports of home damage in the region. One death was recorded in Biloxi when a person was found dead on the Broadwater Marina, having drowned after being surrounded by storm surge. Overall, Zeta caused $650 million damage in Mississippi.

==== Alabama ====
Zeta caused an estimated $840 million of damage in Alabama. The storm produced substantial wind damage across the state, particularly in Mobile and Baldwin counties. Over 400,000 customers lost power. The weather service at Mobile Regional Airport reported sustained winds of 55 mph (89 km/h) and a maximum wind gust of 91 mph (146 km/h). Buccaneer Yacht Club sustained winds of 61 mph (98 km/h) and a gust to 71 mph (114 km/h). A National Ocean Service station at the Bayou La Batre Bridge reported 6.89 feet (2.10 m) of storm surge. Zeta produced widespread gusts of 40–50 mph (64–80 km/h) across central Alabama, with some areas receiving gusts of up to 70 mph (110 km/h). One person died when a tree fell on a mobile home in rural Clarke County.

==== East Coast of the United States ====
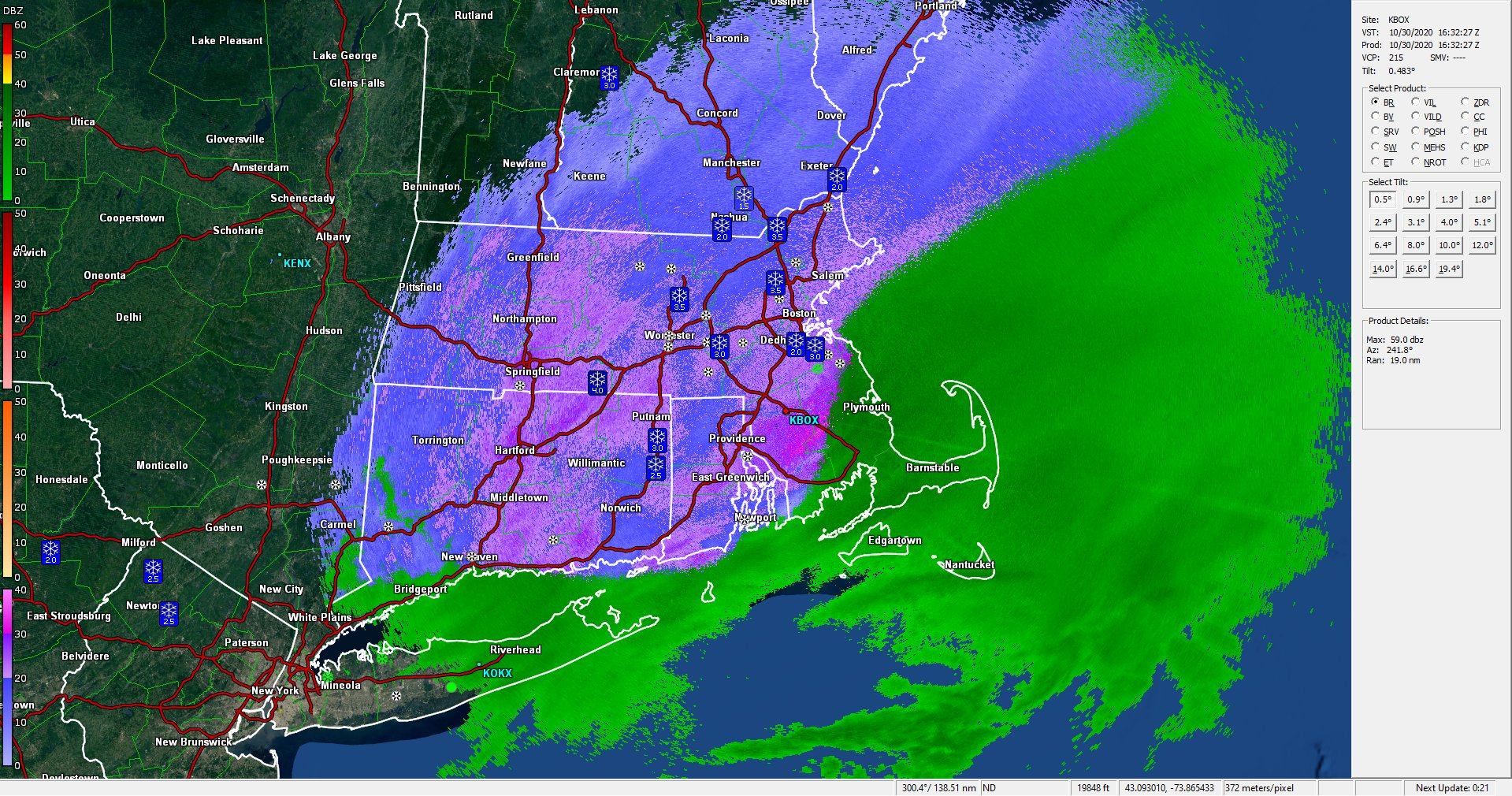
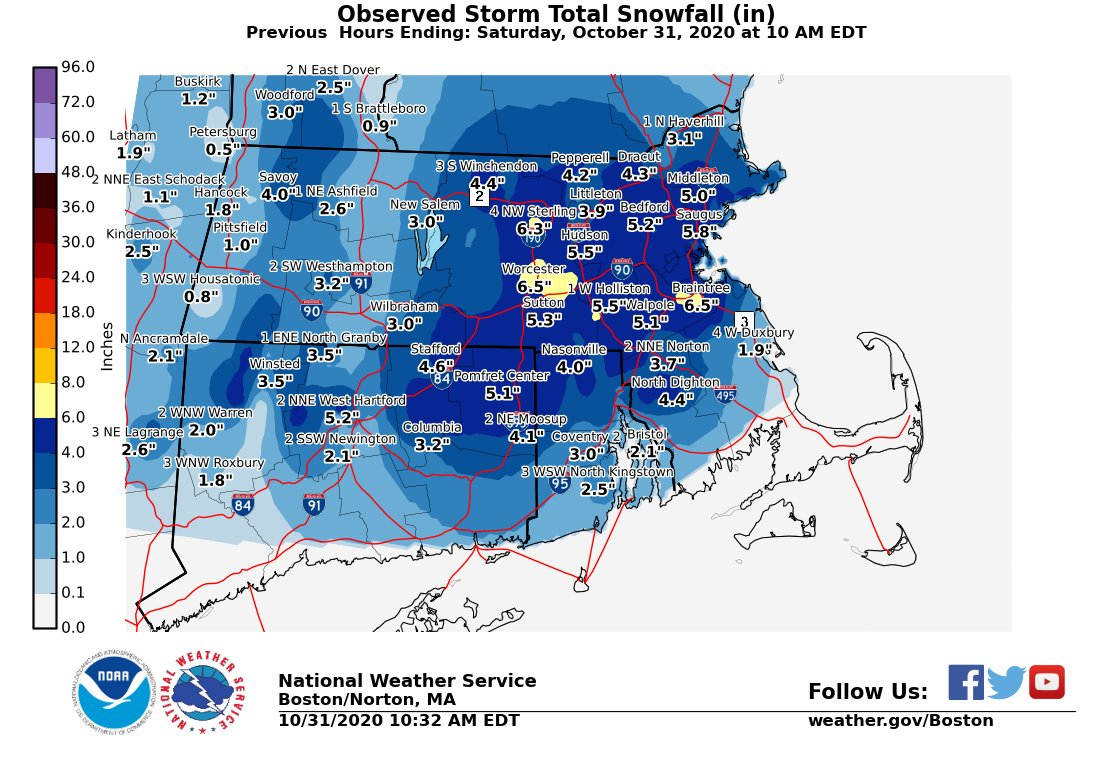
The precipitation in New England from Zeta on October 30 as seen on NWS Boston radar (top) and a snowfall map from Zeta showing snowfall amounts in southern New England (bottom).

After interacting and merging with the winter storm located over the Southern Plains, Zeta caused widespread wind damage throughout the rest of the Southeastern United States. A wind gust of 52 mph (84 km/h) was observed in Pensacola, Florida. Zeta crossed over Northern Georgia beginning at 05:00 UTC on October 29, causing major impacts, especially in Metro Atlanta. Wind gust was recorded to be up to 60 mph (97 km/h) on the Georgia/Alabama border, near Piedmont, Alabama. In Acworth, Georgia, a large oak tree was uprooted and fell on a mobile home, killing a man. Two other adults and a child were in the home at the time of the incident but were not injured. Two other people in Buford, Georgia, also died from a tree falling onto their house. Nearly a million people in Metro Atlanta were without power the morning after the storm. Thousands of people in Metro Atlanta were still without power four days after the storm, in addition to at least one polling location which was to be used for the 2020 elections, resulting in an emergency change in such locations. Overall, Zeta caused $1.1 billion damage in Georgia, becoming one of the top five costliest tropical cyclones in Georgia in the process.

In North Carolina, sustained tropical-storm force winds moved over the entire state. A sustained wind of 41 mph (66 km/h) and a gust to 82 mph (132 km/h) was reported at Cashiers while a sustained wind of 38 mph (61 km/h) and a gust to 51 mph (82 km/h) were reported at the Greensboro Piedmont Triad International Airport. A sustained wind of 51 mph (82 km/h) and a gust to 72 mph (116 km/h) was also reported at a station in Conway, to the east of Roanoke Rapids. As the storm raced offshore, a sustained wind of 39 mph (63 km/h) and a gust to 46 mph (74 km/h) was reported at Ocean City, Maryland. Overall, Zeta caused $550 million damage in the Carolinas and $25 million in Virginia.

In parts of southern New England and upstate New York, the remnants of post-tropical cyclone Zeta brought accumulating snow to the region, after interacting with a cold front also moving through, with snow falling as far south as Mount Pocono, Pennsylvania. The highest amount of accumulation was 6.5 in (17 cm) of snow recorded in Grafton, Massachusetts. The National Weather Service at Norton, Massachusetts set a monthly record for snow, at 3.5 in (8.9 cm). Significant snow was even recorded as far south as Connecticut, with 2 in (5.1 cm) of snow falling at Bradley International Airport. This early-season snowstorm resulted in some downed tree branches in the region. The snowstorm also caused slippery road surfaces, leading to numerous crashes, some serious, in the state of Massachusetts. The cold front associated with Zeta dropped temperatures on the morning of October 31 to 19 °F (−7 °C) in Albany, New York, just one degree shy of the record. This is well below the typical low temperature of 35 °F (2 °C). Highs that day struggled to get into the 40s. Parts of New Jersey saw temperatures get as low as 20 °F (−7 °C) after Zeta dropped snow in the northern portion of the state, acculumating to 2.4 in (6.1 cm) in High Point State Park.

=== United Kingdom ===
Wettest tropical cyclones and their remnants in the United Kingdom Highest-known totals
Precipitation			Storm	Location	Ref.
Rank	mm	in	Storm	Location	Ref.
1	150.0	5.91	Bertha 2014	Inverness, Highland	
2	135.0	5.31	Charley 1986	Abergwyngregyn, Gwynedd	
3	130.0	5.12	Nadine 2012	Ravensworth, North Yorkshire	
4	76.0	2.99	Lili 1996	Chale Bay, Isle of Wight	
5	61.7	2.43	Zeta 2020	Chipping, Lancashire	
6	48.8	1.92	Grace 2009	Capel Curig, Conwy	
7	42.2	1.66	Gordon 2006	Wainfleet All Saints, Lincolnshire	
8	38.0	1.50	Gonzalo 2014	Glenmoriston, Highland	
9	31.0	1.22	Bill 2009	Shap, Cumbria	
10	30.0	1.18	Laura 2008	Windermere, Cumbria	

The remnant energy of Zeta crossed the United Kingdom on November 1–2, less than a day after Storm Aiden had impacted the country. Due to the risk of further heavy rainfall across areas previously impacted by Aiden, the Environment Agency issued more than 40 flood alerts ahead of the arrival of Zeta's remnants. The system re-intensified into a hurricane-force extratropical cyclone while centered off the western coast of Scotland on 1 November. Heavy rainfall resulted in the River Wharfe bursting its banks in West Yorkshire, flooding properties in the town of Otley.

It was responsible for flooding in North Wales after bringing prolonged heavy rainfall to the region. The village of Dolgarrog suffered extensive damage after flash flooding inundated the entire village, including Dolgarrog railway station, causing the suspension of services along the Conwy Valley line. In Betws-y-Coed, the A5 road was closed; the nearby Dolgellau Bypass was also closed due to flooding. Several rivers burst their banks, including the River Dee, causing damage in Bangor-on-Dee, Corwen, Llangollen and Wrexham. In Trefriw, officers from North Wales Police rescued several residents from flooded homes overnight.

High winds also caused disruption to transport. Along the A55 road in north Wales, speed restrictions were in place on the Britannia Bridge and around Conwy Tunnel, while Dyfi Bridge on the A487 was closed. The A525 was blocked by fallen trees. The M62 motorway was closed between Leeds and Manchester after high winds caused a lorry to overturn, landing on top of a van in the next lane. At Birmingham Airport, high winds caused difficulty for arriving aircraft.

== Records and naming ==
Upon formation, Zeta became the earliest 27th Atlantic tropical or subtropical storm on record, surpassing the old mark of November 29, set by Hurricane Epsilon in 2005. It also became the latest major hurricane to strike the continental United States in the calendar year on record, surpassing the 1921 Tampa Bay hurricane.

The 2020 season was the second (along with 2005) in which an alphabetic list of 21 storm names had been exhausted, necessitating use of the Greek alphabet auxiliary list. In March 2021, the World Meteorological Organization replaced that auxiliary list with a new 21-name supplemental list. As a result, the name Zeta will not be used to name another Atlantic hurricane.

== See also ==
- Tropical cyclones in 2020
- List of Louisiana hurricanes (2000–present)
- List of Mississippi hurricanes
- List of Category 3 Atlantic hurricanes
- List of costliest Atlantic hurricanes
