= National Weather Service New Orleans/Baton Rouge, Louisiana =

Forecast office of the National Weather Service

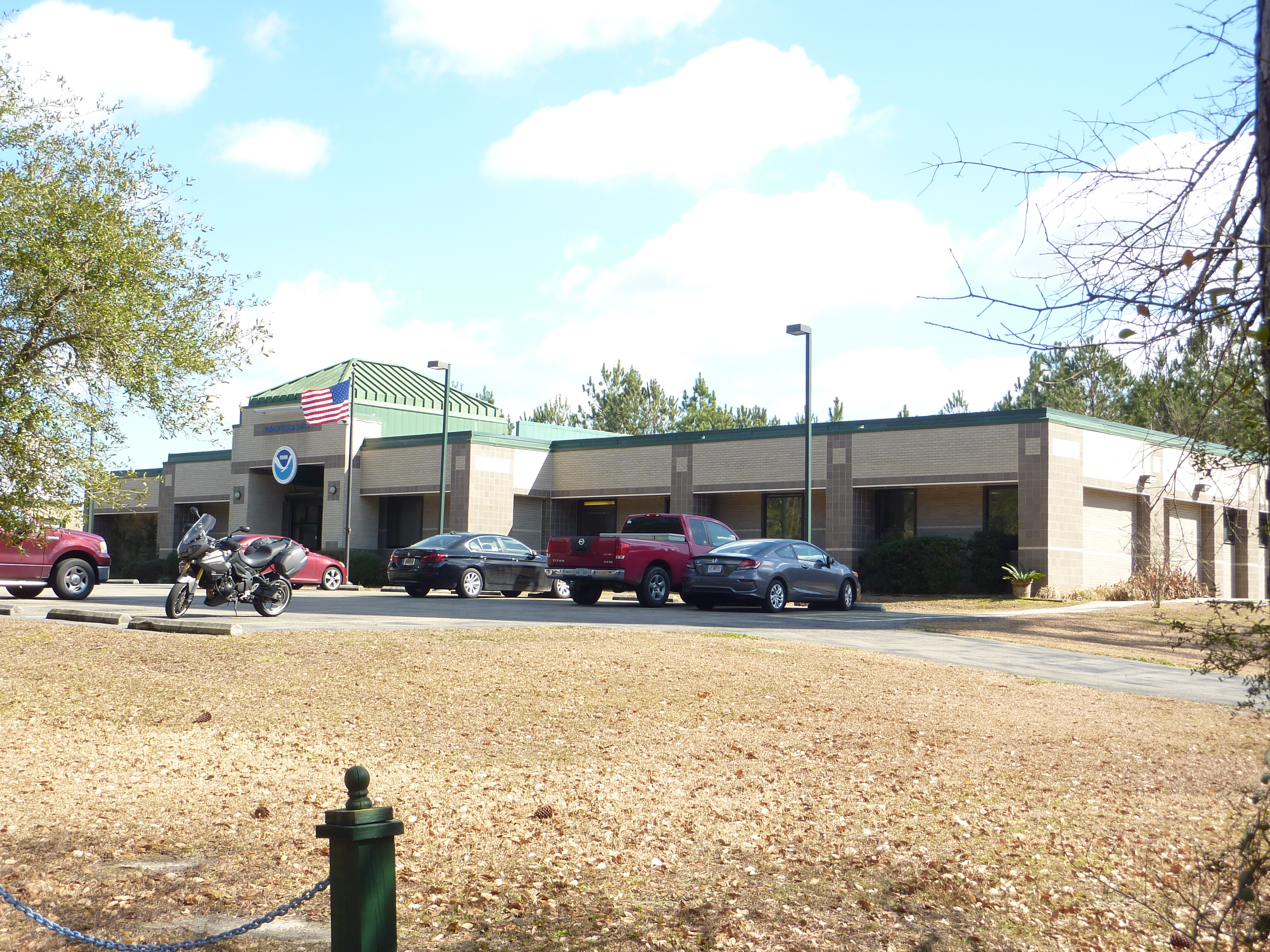
- Types: branch
- Location: Slidell
- Country: United States
- Coordinates: 30°20′12″N 89°49′32″W
- Parent organisations: National Weather Service
- Website: www.weather.gov/lix

The National Weather Service Weather Forecast Office New Orleans/Baton Rouge, Louisiana is a National Weather Service office located in Slidell, Louisiana.

== History ==
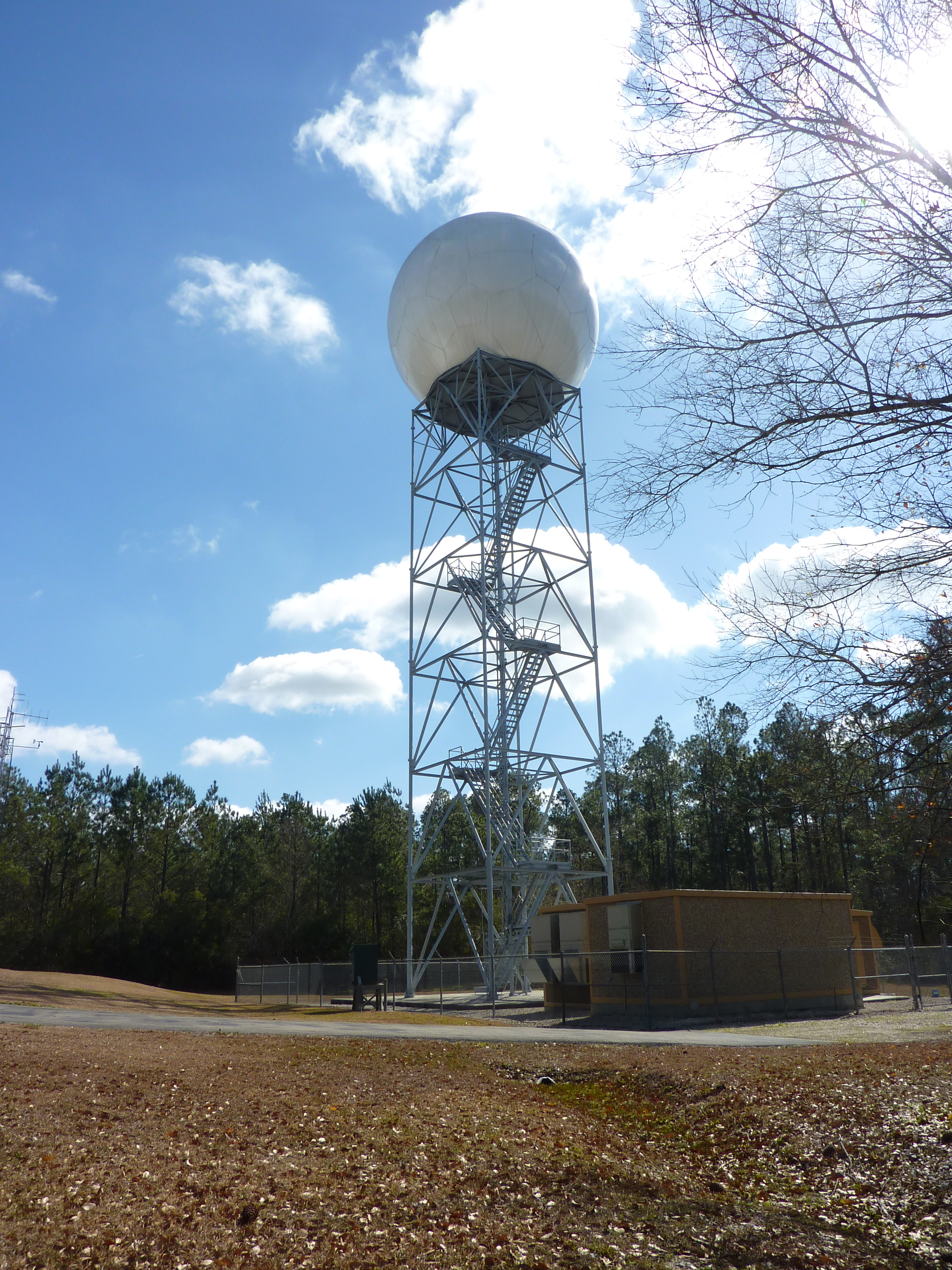
The KLIX NEXRAD radar in Slidell.

Coverage of NWS Weather Forecast Offices where New Orleans/Baton Rouge is LIX.

The National Weather Service Weather Forecast Office New Orleans/Baton Rouge has its origins in a U.S. Army Signal Service office opened in Downtown New Orleans on October 4, 1870. A hurricane forecast center operated in the New Orleans office from 1935 until 1966, when its responsibilities were transferred to the National Hurricane Center. In 1979, the New Orleans forecast office moved to Slidell, merging with the radar observatory that had operated there since 1972. In 1993, the Baton Rouge forecast office was closed and its functions were transferred to the office in Slidell.

In November 2023, it was notified to the public that the KLIX radar would be moved someplace else as it would provide better coverage of any weather that needed to be monitored. From that point until March 2024 meteorologists had to rely on radars at Lake Charles from the west and Mobile from the east. In March 2024, the new radar was stationed in Hammond and now provides coverage in between Lake Charles and Mobile with the call ID of KHDC.

== NOAA Weather Radio ==

The National Weather Service Weather Forecast Office New Orleans/Baton Rouge, Louisiana currently provides programming for 6 NOAA Weather Radio stations.

=== KHB-43 New Orleans ===
KHB43
- New Orleans, Louisiana
- Broadcast area: New Orleans metropolitan area
- Frequency: 162.550 MHz

Technical information
- Class: C
- Power: 1,000 Watts
- HAAT: 502 M

Links
- Website: www.srh.noaa.gov/lix NOAA KHB-43 Query

KHB43 (Sometimes referred to as New Orleans All Hazards) is a NOAA Weather Radio station that serves New Orleans metropolitan area and surrounding cities. It is programmed from the National Weather Service forecast offices in New Orleans and Baton Rouge, Louisiana with its transmitter located in New Orleans. It broadcasts weather and hazard information for the following Parishes: Jefferson, Lafourche, Orleans, Plaquemines, St. Bernard, St. Charles, St. James, St. John the Baptist, St. Tammany, and Tangipahoa.

=== WXL-41 Buras ===
WXL41
- Buras, Louisiana
- Broadcast area: Extreme Southern New Orleans metropolitan area
- Frequency: 162.475 MHz

History
- First air date: August 17, 2005

Technical information
- Class: C
- Power: 1,000 Watts
- HAAT: 240 M

Links
- Website: www.srh.noaa.gov/lix NOAA WXL-41 Query

WXL41 (sometimes referred to as Buras All Hazards) is a NOAA Weather Radio station that serves the extreme southern part of the New Orleans metropolitan area and can be heard over 40 miles (64 km) into the Gulf of Mexico. It is programmed from the National Weather Service forecast offices in New Orleans and Baton Rouge, Louisiana with its transmitter located in Buras. It broadcasts weather and hazard information for the following Parishes: Jefferson, and Plaquemines.

==== History ====
Broadcasting activities of WXL41 began on August 17, 2005; when the NWS in New Orleans/Baton Rouge added a transmitter at Buras, giving residents in Southern Louisiana 24-hour access to their NOAA Weather/All Hazards Radio service. 24-Hour weather broadcasts at this transmitter include the marine, shipping and fishing forecasts for the Grand Isle, Leeville and Port Fourchon communities. Less than 2 weeks later, WXL41's transmitter was knocked off the air by Hurricane Katrina. Service was later restored in early 2006 by a way of back-up generator until full power was restored.

=== KHB-46 Baton Rouge ===
KHB46
- Baton Rouge, Louisiana
- Broadcast area: Baton Rouge metropolitan area
- Frequency: 162.400 MHz

Technical information
- Class: C
- Power: 1,000 Watts
- HAAT: 436 M

Links
- Website: www.srh.noaa.gov/lix NOAA KHB-46 Query

KHB46 (sometimes referred to as Baton Rouge All Hazards) is a NOAA Weather Radio station that serves the Baton Rouge Metro Area and surrounding cities. It is programmed from the National Weather Service forecast offices in New Orleans, Louisiana with its transmitter located in Baton Rouge. It broadcasts weather and hazard information for Ascension, East Baton Rouge, East Feliciana, Iberville, Livingston, Pointe Coupee, St. Helena, Tangipahoa, West Baton Rouge, & West Feliciana Parishes in Louisiana; and Wilkinson County in Mississippi.

=== KIH-21 Gulfport ===
KIH21
- Gulfport, Mississippi
- Broadcast area: Biloxi-Gulfport-Pascagoula Metro
- Frequency: 162.400 MHz

Technical information
- Class: C
- Power: 1,000 Watts
- HAAT: 78 M

Links
- Website: www.srh.noaa.gov/lix NOAA KIH-21 Query

KIH21 (sometimes referred to as Gulfport All Hazards) is a NOAA Weather Radio station that serves the Biloxi-Gulfport-Pascagoula Metropolitan area as well as 40 miles into the Gulf of Mexico. It is programmed from the National Weather Service forecast office in New Orleans/Baton Rouge, Louisiana with its transmitter located in the Gulfport, Mississippi. It broadcasts weather and hazard information for the following counties: George, Hancock, Harrison, Jackson, Pearl River, and Stone.

=== KIH-23 Morgan City ===
KIH23
- Morgan City, Louisiana
- Broadcast area: Morgan City / Eastern Lafayette Metro
- Frequency: 162.475 MHz

Technical information
- Class: C
- Power: 1,000 Watts
- HAAT: 449 M

Links
- Website: www.srh.noaa.gov/lix NOAA KIH-23 Query

KIH23 (sometimes referred to as Morgan City All Hazards) is a NOAA Weather Radio station that serves Morgan City and vicinity as well as part of the Lafayette Metro Area. It is programmed from the National Weather Service forecast offices in New Orleans and Baton Rouge, Louisiana with its transmitter located in Morgan City. It broadcasts weather and hazard information for the following Parishes: Ascension, Assumption, Iberia, Iberville, Lafourche, St. James, Lower St. Martin, St. Mary, and Terrebonne.

==== History ====
KIH23's tower was destroyed by Hurricane Gustav during the Labor Day weekend in 2008. A temporary tower was in place at a lower height and power until a new transmitter was fully constructed in December 2008.

=== WNG-521 Bogalusa ===
WNG521
- Bogalusa, Louisiana
- Frequency: 162.525 MHz

Technical information
- Power: 1,000 Watts

Links
- Website: www.srh.noaa.gov/lix NOAA WNG-521 Query

WNG521 is a NOAA Weather Radio station that provides weather and hazard information for the following Parishes in Louisiana: Washington, St. Tammany, Tangipahoa, and St. Helena, as well as Pike, Walthall, Marion, Lamar, and Pearl River, counties in Mississippi.
