= National Weather Service Raleigh, North Carolina =

Forecast Office serving central North Carolina

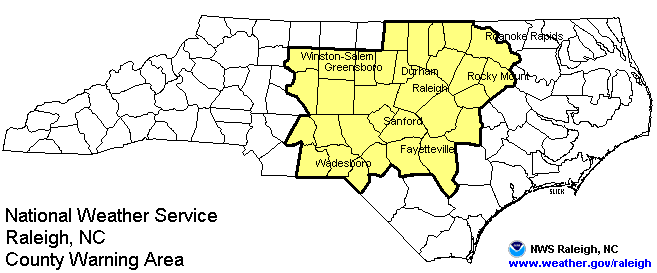
The NWS Raleigh County Warning area covers 31 counties.

The National Weather Service Raleigh, North Carolina (RAH) is a local Weather Forecast Office for central North Carolina. The NWS in Raleigh serves 31 counties in NC and these 31 counties have a population of 7.74 million people, including the cities of Raleigh, Durham, Greensboro, Winston-Salem, and Fayetteville, North Carolina.

== Description ==
The NWS In Raleigh began in January 1887. In 1896, NWS Raleigh moved to the Fisher Building, and remained there until 1908, when the office moved to the fourth floor of the Masonic Temple in Raleigh. It would remain here until December 1940. In December 1940, the office moved to the Administration Building at Raleigh-Durham International Airport (called Raleigh Municipal Airport at the time), and would move a few times on the airport grounds over the years. In November 1979, NWS Raleigh moved to the Cargo Building at RDU, and would remain there until 1994. On January 19, 1994, NWS Raleigh moved to the Centennial Campus at North Carolina State University, though a skeleton staff remained at RDU to take observations and man the WSR-74 radar until June 30, 1996.

The current Warning Coordinator is Nick Petro.

NWS Raleigh Operates 7 NOAA Weather Radio transmitters throughout central North Carolina.

Call sign	City	Frequency	SAME CODE
WWF60	Buck Mountain, NC	162.500 MHz	037007 (Anson County)
WXL58	Chapel Hill, NC	162.550 MHz	037063 (Durham County)
WNG597	Ellerbe, NC	162.400 MHz	037123 (Montgomery County)
WNG706	Garner, NC	162.450 MHz	037183 (Wake County)
WNG586	Henderson, NC	162.500 MHz	037069 (Franklin County)
WXL59	Tarboro, NC	162.475 MHz	037015 (Bertie County)
WXL42	Winston-Salem, NC	162.400 MHz	037081 (Guilford County)

NWS Raleigh operates a WSR-88D Doppler weather radar with the Callsign, KRAX located along US70 BUS just inside the Johnston County line in Clayton. NWS Raleigh also operates a TDWR With the callsign TRDU located along the shore of Falls Lake, near the intersection of NC50 & NC98.

KRAX underwent a major upgrade in 2017.
