= National Weather Service State College, Pennsylvania =

Weather Forecast Office of the National Weather Service

National Weather Service Weather Forecast Office State College, Pennsylvania
- National Weather Service

Agency overview
- Jurisdiction: Federal Government of the United States
- Headquarters: 328 Innovation Boulevard State College, Pennsylvania U.S.
- Employees: 25
- Agency executives: Ashley Evans, Meteorologist-in-Charge; Jonathan Guseman, Warning Coordination Meteorologist
- Parent agency: National Weather Service
- Website: www.weather.gov/ctp

The National Weather Service State College, Pennsylvania is a Weather Forecast Office (WFO) of the National Weather Service responsible for monitoring weather conditions in central Pennsylvania. Open since May 1993, the office serves 33 counties and has about 25 employees.

== Counties served ==
The National Weather Service in State College, Pennsylvania covers approximately half of the counties in Pennsylvania including Adams, Blair, Bedford, Cambria, Cameron, Centre, Clearfield, Clinton, Columbia, Cumberland, Dauphin, Elk, Franklin, Fulton, Huntingdon, Juniata, Lancaster, Lebanon, Lycoming, McKean, Mifflin, Montour, Northumberland, Perry, Potter, Schuylkill, Snyder, Somerset, Sullivan, Tioga, Union, Warren, and York.

== First-order climatological stations ==
- Harrisburg International Airport
- Williamsport Regional Airport

== Automated airport weather stations ==
- Altoona-Blair County Airport
- Bradford Regional Airport
- Johnstown-Cambria County Airport
- Lancaster Airport
- State College Regional Airport
