= National Weather Service Los Angeles–Oxnard =

Weather forecast office

National Weather Service Weather Forecast Office Los Angeles

Agency overview
- Type: Meteorological
- Jurisdiction: National Weather Service
- Headquarters: 520 North Elevar Street; Oxnard, CA 93030; 34.2071°N 119.1377°W
- Employees: 28
- Agency executives: Mark Jackson, Meteorologist in Charge; John Dumas, Science Operations Officer; Eric Boldt, Warning Coordination Meteorologist
- Parent agency: National Weather Service
- Website: www.weather.gov/lox/

The National Weather Service Los Angeles is a local office of the National Weather Service responsible for monitoring weather conditions in Los Angeles, Ventura, Santa Barbara, and San Luis Obispo counties, as well as adjacent coastal waters out 60 nautical miles. The NWS Los Angeles office serves the third-most populous district in the nation, after NWS New York City and NWS Philadelphia.

== History ==
The Signal Service established an office at Los Angeles in 1877, at the corner of Main and Commercial Streets, with the Weather Bureau assuming responsibility in 1890. During the 1940s, the city office moved to the Los Angeles Civic Center district. The Civic Center office closed in 1964, and the main forecast office was relocated at the Wilshire Federal Building where it remained until the current Oxnard location opened in 1993.

An airport station was established at Mines Field (now LAX) in 1931, with a District Forecast Office established there on April 7, 1947, having relocated from Burbank. This satellite office was open until in 1997 when it was redesignated a NWS Contract Meteorological Observatory. In 2002 this observatory was transferred to the Federal Aviation Administration.

A regional headquarters of the National Weather Service was located in Los Angeles from 1943 to 1949.

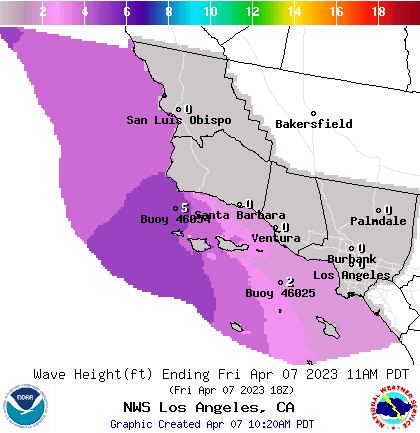
Wave height map created by National Weather Service Los Angeles showing jurisdiction on land (gray) and sea (purple)

== NOAA Weather Radio ==
The National Weather Service Los Angeles forecast office provides programming for eight NOAA Weather Radio stations.

City of license	Call sign	Frequency (MHz)	Power	Service area of transmitter
San Luis Obispo	KIH31	162.550 MHz	330 watts	Los Angeles CA
Santa Barbara	KIH34	162.400 MHz	330 watts	Los Angeles CA
Malibu Marine	KWL22	162.425 MHz	300 watts	Los Angeles CA
Los Angeles	KWO37	162.550 MHz	300 watts	Los Angeles CA
Avalon	WNG584	162.525 MHz	100 watts	Los Angeles CA
San Simeon	WNG592	162.525 MHz	100 watts	Los Angeles CA
Santa Barbara Marine	WWF62	162.475 MHz	100 watts	Los Angeles CA
Sandberg	WZ2505	162.425 MHz	100 watts	Los Angeles CA

== See also ==
- List of National Weather Service Weather Forecast Offices
