= National Weather Service St. Louis, Missouri =

Weather forecast office of the National Weather Service

National Weather Service St. Louis is the National Weather Service office located in St. Charles, Missouri, just outside St. Louis, Missouri. There are 46 counties in its County Warning Area (CWA). Some of the cities in its CWA are Columbia, Farmington, Hannibal and Jefferson City in Missouri, and Belleville, Centralia, Edwardsville, and Quincy in Illinois.

== NOAA Weather Radio stations ==

The St. Louis office operates 11 stations in western Illinois and eastern Missouri.

=== KDO-89 ===
KDO89 - St. Louis All Hazards
- Shrewsbury/St. Louis, Missouri
- Broadcast area: Greater St. Louis
- Frequency: 162.550 MHz
- Branding: NOAA All Hazards Radio

Programming
- Format: Weather/Civil Emergency

Ownership
- Owner: NOAA/National Weather Service

Technical information
- Class: C
- Power: 1,000 Watts
- HAAT: 1,079 M

Links
- Webcast: KDO89 Online
- Website: www.weather.gov/lsx

KDO89 (sometimes referred to as St. Louis All Hazards) is a NOAA Weather Radio station that serves Greater St. Louis and surrounding cities. It is programmed from the National Weather Service forecast office in St. Louis, Missouri with its transmitter located in Shrewsbury. It broadcasts weather and hazard information for the independent city of St. Louis as well as the following counties: Franklin, Jefferson, Lincoln, St. Charles, St. Louis, and Warren in Missouri as well as Madison, Monroe, and St. Clair counties in Illinois.

=== WWF-75 ===
WWF-75
- Bourbon, Missouri
- Frequency: 162.525 MHz
- Branding: NOAA All Hazards Radio

Programming
- Format: Weather/Civil Emergency

Technical information
- Power: 1,000 Watts

Links
- Website: www.weather.gov/lsx

WWF-75 is located just northeast of Bourbon, Missouri operating at 162.525 MHz. The station serves Cuba, Sullivan, and Union and provides weather and hazard information for Gasconade, Franklin, Crawford, Washington, Iron, and Phelps counties in Missouri. Programming for Phelps County is provided by the National Weather Service office in Springfield, Missouri.

=== WXK-82 ===
WXK-82
- Hannibal, Missouri
- Frequency: 162.475 MHz
- Branding: NOAA All Hazards Radio

Programming
- Format: Weather/Civil Emergency

Technical information
- Power: 1,000 Watts

Links
- Website: www.weather.gov/lsx

WXK-82 is located adjacent to Palmyra Rd. in northwest Hannibal, Missouri, operating at 162.475 MHz. The station provides weather and hazard information for Lewis, Shelby, Marion, Monroe, Ralls, and Pike counties in Missouri, as well as Adams, Brown, and Pike counties in Illinois.

=== WXL-45 ===
WXL-45
- Columbia, Missouri
- Frequency: 162.400 MHz
- Branding: NOAA All Hazards Radio

Programming
- Format: Weather/Civil Emergency

Technical information
- Power: 1,000 Watts

Links
- Website: www.weather.gov/lsx

WXL-45 is located adjacent to County Rd. 202 just northwest of Fulton in Callaway County, Missouri, operating at 162.400 MHz. The station provides weather and hazard information for Audrain, Boone, Callaway, Cole, Osage, and Gasconade counties in Missouri. Licensed to Columbia but identifying on-air as "WXL45 Fulton," it provides local forecasts for Columbia, Jefferson City and Mexico. Columbia and Jefferson City are also served by KWN55 in Jamestown, a newer transmitter that provides a stronger signal than WXL45 to much of Boone County and Cole County.

=== WWG-49 ===
WWG-49
- Fredericktown, Missouri
- Frequency: 162.500 MHz
- Branding: NOAA All Hazards Radio

Programming
- Format: Weather/Civil Emergency

Technical information
- Power: 1,000 Watts

Links
- Website: www.weather.gov/lsx

WWG-49 is located near Cedar Mountain southwest of Fredericktown on Route C in Madison County, Missouri, operating at 162.500 MHz. The station provides weather and hazard information for St. Francois, Ste. Genevieve, Iron, Reynolds, Madison, Wayne, and Bollinger counties in Missouri. Watches and warnings for Wayne and Bollinger counties are provided by the National Weather Service office located in Paducah, Kentucky.

=== KXI-49 ===
KXI-49 is located southeast of Salem, IL. It operates at 162.475 MHz and serves Salem, Mt. Vernon, and Centralia in south-central Illinois.

=== KXI-70 ===
KXI70 - Jerseyville All Hazards
- Jerseyville, Illinois
- Broadcast area: Jerseyville/Greater St. Louis
- Frequency: 162.450 MHz
- Branding: NOAA All Hazards Radio

Programming
- Format: Weather/Civil Emergency

Ownership
- Owner: NOAA/National Weather Service

Technical information
- Class: C
- Power: 300 Watts
- HAAT: 84 M

Links
- Website: www.weather.gov/lsx

KXI70 (sometimes referred to as Jerseyville All Hazards) is a NOAA Weather Radio station that serves Jerseyville, Illinois and surrounding cities as well as the northern and northeastern portions of the Greater St. Louis area. It is programmed from the National Weather Service forecast office in St. Louis, Missouri with its transmitter located southeast of Jerseyville. It broadcasts weather and hazard information for the following counties in Illinois: Calhoun, Greene, Jersey, Macoupin, and Madison.

=== KXI-42 ===
Located northwest of Chester, IL and operating at 162.450 MHz, KXI-42 serves Chester, Illinois, Ste. Genevieve, Missouri and Perryville, Missouri.

=== KXI-79 ===
Located just east of Coffeen Lake near Hillsboro, IL and operating at 162.425 MHz, KXI-79 serves Litchfield and Vandalia in south-central Illinois.

=== KWN-55 ===
Located west of Jamestown in Moniteau County and operating at 162.425 MHz, KWN-55 serves Columbia, Jefferson City, and California in central Missouri. Together with WXL45, the station serves the Columbia and Jefferson City areas.

=== WNG-728 ===
Located immediately north of Hawk Point in Lincoln County, WNG-728 operates at 162.425 MHz and serves parts of east-central Missouri including Bowling Green, Warrenton, Troy, Wentzville, and fringe coverage extending from Hermann to Louisiana. This station was relocated from Bellflower in 2023 after being off the air for nearly two years. The new location has resulted in diminished coverage on the western side of the former site's coverage area, especially in Monroe, Audrain, Callaway, Osage, and Gasconade counties.
