= National Weather Service Binghamton, New York =

National Weather Service station

National Weather Service Binghamton
- NWS BGM

Agency overview
- Formed: July 1890
- Jurisdiction: Central New York and Northeast Pennsylvania
- Headquarters: Johnson City, New York (Binghamton metropolitan area)
- Employees: 24
- Parent agency: NOAA/NWS
- Website: weather.gov/bgm

The National Weather Service Binghamton, New York is a local office of the National Weather Service responsible for monitoring weather conditions 17 counties in New York and 7 counties in Pennsylvania including the cities of Binghamton, Elmira, Ithaca, Rome, Sayre, Scranton, Syracuse, Utica, and Wilkes-Barre.

== NOAA Weather Radio ==
The National Weather Service Binghamton, New York forecast office provides programming for 13 NOAA Weather Radio stations in New York and New Hampshire.

City of license	Call sign	Frequency (MHz)
Binghamton, New York	WXL38	162.475 MHz
Norwich, New York	KHC49	162.525 MHz
Syracuse, New York	WXL31	162.550 MHz
Elmira, New York	WXM31	162.400 MHz
Stamford, New York	WWF43	162.400 MHz
Walton, New York	WWH34	162.425 MHz
Towanda, Pennsylvania	WXM95	162.525 MHz
Cooperstown, New York	WWH35	162.450 MHz
Wilkes Barre/Scranton, Pennsylvania	WXL43	162.550 MHz
Ithaca, New York	WXN59	162.500 MHz
Call Hill - Steuben County, New York	WXN29	162.425 MHz
Mount Washington - Steuben County, New York	WXN55	162.450 MHz
Honesdale, Pennsylvania	WNG705	162.450 MHz
