= National Weather Service Boston, Massachusetts =

NWS Forecast Office serving Southern New England

National Weather Service Weather Forecast Office Boston / Norton, Massachusetts

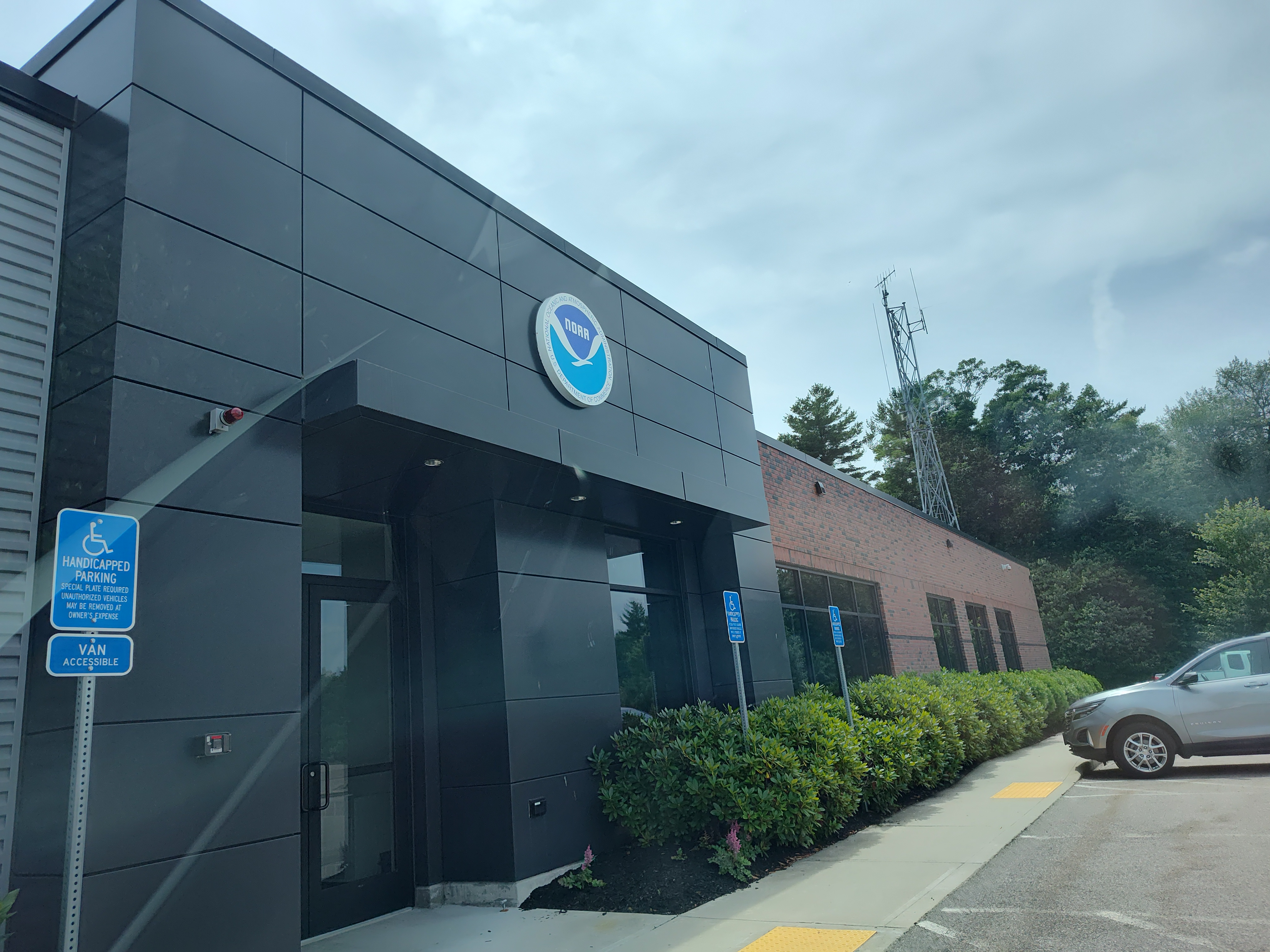

Agency overview
- Formed: November 1870; 155 years ago
- Type: Meteorological
- Jurisdiction: National Weather Service
- Headquarters: 46 Commerce Way; Norton, MA 02766; 41.95643291923493°N 71.13951415227531°W
- Agency executives: Andy Nash, Meteorologist in Charge; Christine Griffith, Administrative Support Assistant
- Parent agency: National Weather Service
- Website: www.weather.gov/box/

The National Weather Service Boston/Norton, Massachusetts, is a local office of the National Weather Service (NWS), run under the auspices of the NWS's Eastern Region. This weather forecast office (WFO) is responsible for monitoring weather conditions throughout most of southern New England. The southern New England weather forecast office provides warning and forecast services for most of Massachusetts, Northern Connecticut, and all of Rhode Island. Besides public weather services, WFO Norton (BOX) provides marine, aviation, fire weather, and hydrological forecast services. Additional hydrologic information is provided by the co-located Northeast River Forecast Center (NERFC).

Although it serves Boston and the surrounding areas, the WFO is actually located at Norton, a town in Bristol County, which is located around 30 miles (48 km) south of Boston.

Public warnings and forecasts are issued for thirty-four "public forecast zones" (which are counties or portions of counties) across portions of Massachusetts, Connecticut, and all of Rhode Island. Warnings are issued for a wide range of phenomena that include tornadoes, severe thunderstorms, flash floods, coastal floods, high winds, and winter storms. Public forecasts cover a range from the next few hours to the next seven days.

The WFO BOX also issues marine forecasts, warnings, and advisories for the coastal waters from the Merrimack River in Massachusetts to Watch Hill, Rhode Island.

The aviation community is also served by the WFO BOX. In addition to Logan International Airport, this WFO prepares aviation forecasts for eight other airports across southern New England.

Fire weather forecasts are also generated from WFO BOX for the southern New England. These forecasts are used by federal and local agencies that deal with brush fire control.

Other types of information issued from WFO BOX include short-term forecasts, weather summaries, special weather statements, and river stage conditions. Information from this office is sent out by high-speed computer circuits, and they become available to a wide range of users, including media such as television, radio, newspapers, and internet-based weather providers.

The greater Boston area is rich in meteorological history. The official weather records for the city of Boston go back to October 20, 1870, at the Old State House Building on State and Devonshire Streets. Weather records began being kept at the airport, then known as the Boston Airport, in October 1926.

The office and river forecasting office moved to a new location in Norton on March 20, 2018. The radar remains at its previous location in Taunton.

== First-order/climate sites ==
- Connecticut
  - Bradley International Airport (Windsor Locks), although officially designated for Hartford.
- Massachusetts
  - Blue Hill Meteorological Observatory (Milton)
  - Logan International Airport (Boston)
  - Worcester Regional Airport
- Rhode Island
  - T. F. Green Airport (near Providence)

== NOAA Weather Radio ==
The National Weather Service Boston, Massachusetts, forecast office, based in Taunton, Massachusetts, provides programming for six NOAA Weather Radio stations in Massachusetts, Connecticut, and Rhode Island.

City of license	Broadcast area	Call sign	Frequency (MHz)
Boston, Massachusetts	Greater Boston	KHB35	162.475 MHz
Gloucester, Massachusetts	Greater Boston (marine)	WNG574	162.425 MHz
Worcester, Massachusetts	Central Massachusetts	WXL93	162.550 MHz
Hyannis, Massachusetts	Cape Cod, Martha’s Vineyard and Nantucket	KEC73	162.550 MHz
Providence, Rhode Island	Rhode Island/SouthCoast (Massachusetts)	WXJ39	162.400 MHz
Hartford, Connecticut	Hartford-Springfield	WXJ41	162.475 MHz
