= National Weather Service Albany, New York =

The National Weather Service Albany, New York is a local office of the National Weather Service responsible for monitoring weather conditions for eastern New York State and portions of western New England (extreme Southern Vermont, western Massachusetts and northwestern Connecticut).
