= National Weather Service Northern Indiana =

National Weather Service Weather Forecast Office Northern Indiana

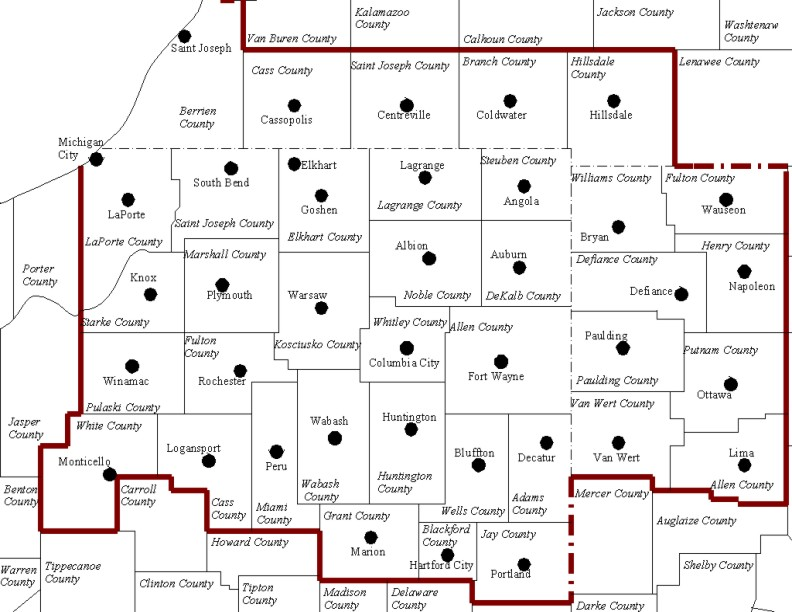
- The Northern Indiana NWS office's county warning area, bordered in dark red. A total of 37 counties (24 in Indiana, 8 in Ohio, and 5 in Michigan) receive weather information, forecasts, watches, and warnings from the Northern Indiana office

Agency overview
- Type: Meteorological
- Jurisdiction: Federal Government of the United States
- Headquarters: 7506 E 850 N, Syracuse, IN 46567
- Employees: 23
- Agency executives: Mark Frazier, Meteorologist in Charge; Dustin Norman, Warning Coordination Meteorologist
- Parent agency: National Weather Service
- Website: www.weather.gov/iwx/

National Weather Service Northern Indiana (IWX) is a National Weather Service forecast office located between the towns of Syracuse and North Webster in Kosciusko County, Indiana. It provides weather and emergency information to twenty-four counties in northern Indiana, eight counties in northwest Ohio, and five counties in the southwestern Lower Peninsula of Michigan.

Most counties served by this office are located within the Eastern Time Zone (ET); the exceptions are LaPorte and Starke counties in Indiana, which are located within the Central Time Zone (CT).

== History ==
Prior to the establishment of the Northern Indiana office, the National Weather Service and its predecessor, the U.S. Weather Bureau, operated separate offices in Fort Wayne and South Bend. The Fort Wayne office was established in 1911 and the South Bend office in 1939. In March 1998, the National Weather Service merged the Fort Wayne and South Bend offices together to create the National Weather Service in Northern Indiana. The new office moved into its present facilities between Syracuse and North Webster in August 1999 and assumed full responsibility for its county warning area in September 1999.

== NOAA Weather Radio ==
The Northern Indiana office operates the following six NOAA Weather Radio transmitters to serve northern Indiana, northwest Ohio, southwestern Lower Michigan, and the southern portion of Lake Michigan.

City of license	Call sign	Frequency (MHz)	Service area of transmitter
La Porte, Indiana	KJY62	162.500 MHz	Michigan City area, southern Lake Michigan
Angola, Indiana	KXI94	162.425 MHz	extreme northeast Indiana, extreme northwest Ohio, extreme south central Michigan
North Webster, Indiana	KZZ36	162.500 MHz	Warsaw area
Mishawaka, Indiana	WXJ57	162.400 MHz	South Bend area
Fort Wayne, Indiana	WXJ58	162.550 MHz	Fort Wayne area
Marion, Indiana	WXM98	162.450 MHz	Marion area

The North Webster and Marion transmitters operate at 300 Watts; all other transmitters operate at 1000 Watts.
