= National Weather Service Hastings, Nebraska =

Weather service office in Hastings, NE

Map of the 24 counties in Nebraska and 6 counties in Kansas served by the Hastings NWS Forecast Office.

National Weather Service Hastings Nebraska (Abbreviation: GID) is a local National Weather Service office based in Hastings, Nebraska. Since it went into operation in 1992, it has served twenty-four counties in south-central Nebraska and six counties in north-central Kansas, providing 24-hour weather and emergency information to those counties. Communities that rely on the Hastings Weather Office for weather forecasts include Aurora, Beloit, Grand Island, Hastings, Hebron, Holdrege, Kearney, Lexington, Ord, Phillipsburg, Superior, and York.

== NOAA Weather Radio ==
NWS Hastings operates seven NOAA Weather Radio transmitters to serve their operational area.

Station	Location	Frequency (MHz)	Power (Watts)	Counties Served
WXL-74	Giltner/Grand Island	162.400	1000	In Nebraska: Adams, Buffalo, Clay, Fillmore, Hall, Hamilton, Howard, Merrick, Nance, Polk, Sherman, York
WXL-75	Atlanta/Holdrege	162.475	1000	In Nebraska: Buffalo, Dawson, Franklin, Gosper, Harlan, Kearney, Phelps
KEC-39	Cambridge	162.525	300	In Nebraska: Frontier, Furnas, Gosper, Red Willow; In Kansas: Decatur, Norton
KWN-62	Ord	162.525	1000	In Nebraska: Custer, Garfield, Greeley, Howard, Loup, Sherman, Valley, Wheeler
KGG-99	Lexington	162.425	300	In Nebraska: Dawson, Frontier, Gosper, Phelps
WNG-578	Superior	162.525	1000	In Nebraska: Adams, Clay, Fillmore, Nuckolls, Thayer, Webster; In Kansas: Jewell, Republic
KWN-59	Kirwin	162.500	1000	In Kansas: Norton, Osborne, Phillips, Rooks, Smith; In Nebraska: Franklin, Harlan
