= National Weather Service Paducah, Kentucky =

Weather forecast office of the National Weather Service

Coordinates: 37.0685°N 88.7726°W

National Weather Service Paducah is a weather forecast office responsible for monitoring weather conditions for 58 counties in the states of Kentucky, Illinois, Indiana and Missouri. The Paducah office is relatively new compared to others, having been built in 1984. The office is in charge of weather forecasts, warnings and local statements as well as aviation weather. It is also equipped with a WSR-88D (NEXRAD) radar, and an Automated Surface Observing System (ASOS) that greatly increase the ability to forecast.

== NOAA Weather Radio ==

National Weather Service Paducah Forecast Office in Paducah, Kentucky provides programming for 11 NOAA Weather Radio stations.

=== KXI52 McLeansboro ===
KXI52
McLeansboro, Illinois
- Frequency: 162.400 MHz

Programming
- Language: English
- Format: Weather/Civil Emergency

Technical information
- Power: 300 Watts

Links
- Website: KXI52

KXI52 broadcasts weather and hazard information for Gallatin, Hamilton, Saline & White counties in Illinois.

=== WXM49 Marion ===
WXM49
Marion, Illinois
- Broadcast area: Southern Illinois
- Frequency: 162.425 MHz

Programming
- Language: English

Technical information
- Power: 1,000 Watts

Links
- Website: WXM49

WXM49 broadcasts weather and hazard information for Alexander, Franklin, Hardin, Jackson, Johnson, Massac, Perry, Pope, Pulaski, Massac, Saline, Union, & Williamson counties in Illinois as well as Ballard County in Kentucky.

=== KIG76 Evansville ===
KIG76
Evansville, Indiana
- Frequency: 162.550 MHz

Programming
- Language: English

Technical information
- Power: 1,000 Watts

Links
- Website: KIG76

KIG76 broadcasts weather and hazard information for Edwards, Wabash & White counties in Illinois; Dubois, Gibson, Perry, Pike, Posey, Spencer, Vanderburgh & Warrick counties in Indiana; as well as Henderson & Union counties in Kentucky.

=== KIH46 Mayfield ===
KIH46
Mayfield, Kentucky
- Frequency: 162.475 MHz

Programming
- Language: English

Technical information
- Power: 1,000 Watts

Links
- Website: KIH46

KIH46 broadcasts weather and hazard information for Massac & Pope counties in Illinois; Ballard, Calloway, Carlisle, Crittenden, Fulton, Graves, Hickman, Livingston, Lyon, Marshall, McCracken & Trigg counties in Kentucky; Mississippi county in Missouri; as well as Henry & Weakley counties in Tennessee.

=== KXI26 Hopkinsville ===
KXI26
Hopkinsville, Kentucky
- Frequency: 162.450 MHz

Programming
- Language: English

Technical information
- Power: 300 Watts

Links
- Website: KXI26

KXI26 broadcasts weather and hazard information for Christian, Todd, & Trigg counties in Kentucky.

=== KZZ61 Whitesville ===
KZZ61
Whitesville, Kentucky
- Frequency: 162.475 MHz

Programming
- Language: English

Technical information
- Power: 300 Watts

Links
- Website: KZZ61

KZZ61 broadcasts weather and hazard information for Perry & Spencer counties in Indiana; as well as Daviess, Hancock, & Ohio counties in Kentucky.

=== WXJ91 Madisonville ===
WXJ91
Madisonville, Kentucky
- Frequency: 162.525 MHz

Programming
- Language: English

Technical information
- Power: 1,000 Watts

Links
- Website: WXJ91

WXJ91 broadcasts weather and hazard information for Caldwell, Christian, Crittenden, Daviess, Henderson, Hopkins, Lyon, McLean, Muhlenberg, Todd, Trigg, Union & Webster counties in Kentucky.

=== KXI66 Piedmont ===
KXI66
Piedmont, Missouri
- Frequency: 162.425 MHz

Programming
- Language: English

Technical information
- Power: 1,000 Watts

Links
- Website: KXI66

KXI66 broadcasts weather and hazard information for Butler, Carter, Reynolds, Ripley & Wayne counties in Missouri.

=== KXI93 Cape Girardeau ===
KXI93
Cape Girardeau, Missouri
- Frequency: 162.550 MHz

Programming
- Language: English

Technical information
- Power: 300 Watts

Links
- Website: KXI93

KXI93 broadcasts weather and hazard information for Bollinger, Cape Girardeau, Mississippi, Perry & Scott counties in Missouri; as well as Alexander & Union counties in Illinois.

=== WWG48 Doniphan ===
WWG48
Doniphan, Missouri
- Frequency: 162.450 MHz

Programming
- Language: English

Technical information
- Power: 1,000 Watts

Links
- Website: WWG48

WWG48 broadcasts weather and hazard information for Butler, Carter, Ripley & Wayne counties in Missouri.

=== WXL47 Bloomfield ===
WXL47
Bloomfield, Missouri
- Broadcast area: Sikeston, Missouri
- Frequency: 162.400 MHz

Programming
- Language: English

Technical information
- Power: 1,000 Watts

Links
- Website: WXL47

WXL47 broadcasts weather and hazard information for Butler, Dunklin, Mississippi, New Madrid, Scott, Stoddard & Wayne counties in Missouri.
