= National Weather Service Mobile, Alabama =

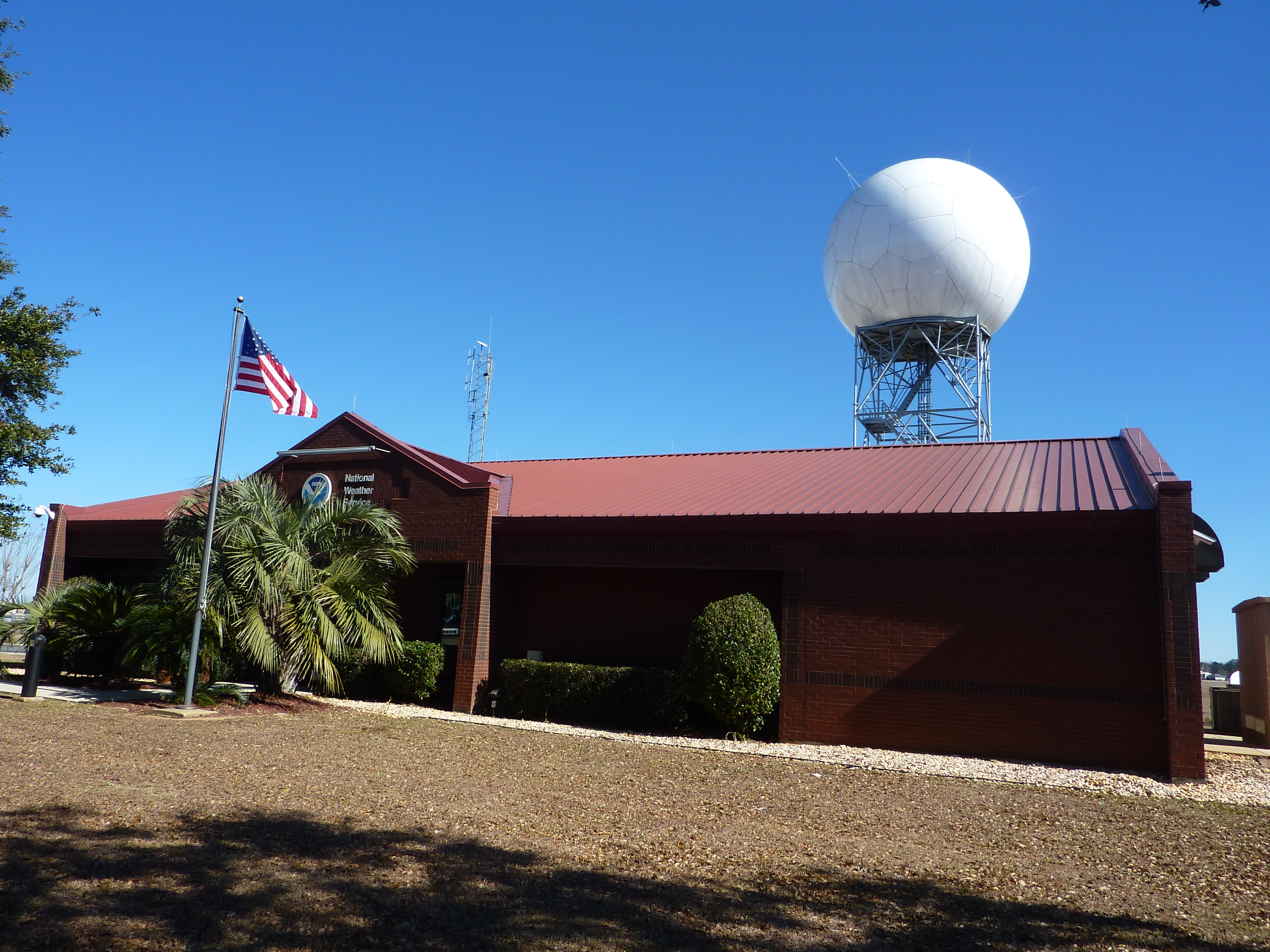
- NWS Forecast office in Mobile, AL
- Types: branch
- Location: Mobile
- Country: United States
- Coordinates: 30°40′46″N 88°14′24″W
- Parent organisations: National Weather Service
- Website: www.weather.gov/mob/

National Weather Service-Mobile, Alabama, also known as National Weather Service-Mobile/Pensacola, is a National Weather Service forecast office that is responsible for monitoring weather conditions for 20 counties in Alabama, Mississippi, and Florida, as well as 11 Marine Zones. The NWS Mobile office is located on the southeast side of Mobile Regional Airport. This area is part of the Southern Region Headquarters.

== Mission and history ==
The Weather Forecast Office (WFO) in Mobile is one of 122 field offices of the National Weather Service (NWS). It is responsible for hydrometeorological public, marine and aviation forecasts and warnings for 20 counties : 5 in southeast Mississippi, 12 in south Alabama and 3 counties in the northwest Florida panhandle. The area of responsibility also covers coastal waters out to 60 nautical miles.

The office in Mobile was originally located downtown Mobile in 1870 as part of the Signal Service. In 1934, it was moved to the old Bates Field (now Brookley Air Force Base) until 1941 when it moved to the terminal building of Bates Field (now the Mobile Regional Airport). The office moved into its present day location, on the southeast side of the airport in 1994.

== Staff ==
The National Weather Service in Mobile, Alabama has 22 staff members. 17 of the staff are meteorologists with a degree in meteorology.

The Staff includes:

- Meteorologist in Charge (supervisor and administrator of the WFO and its programs)
- Warning Coordination Meteorologist (interacts with emergency managers, storm spotters, and media)
- Science and Operations Officer (science and training leader)
- Electronics Systems Analyst
- Information Technology Officer
- 5 Senior Forecasters
- 5 General Forecasters
- 3 Entry-Level Meteorologists
- 1 Observation Program Leader
- 2 Electronic Technicians
- Administrative Support Assistant

== Counties ==
The National Weather Service in Mobile, AL serves 20 counties in 3 states (Mississippi, Alabama, and Florida) in addition to the Gulf of Mexico out to 60 nautical miles.

=== Mississippi ===
George, Greene, Perry, Stone, and Wayne.

=== Alabama ===
Baldwin, Butler, Choctaw, Clarke, Conecuh, Covington, Crenshaw, Escambia, Mobile, Monroe, Washington, and Wilcox.

=== Florida ===
Escambia, Okaloosa, and Santa Rosa.

=== Coastal Waters ===
Destin to Pascagoula out to 60 nautical miles offshore, Choctawhatchee Bay, Mobile Bay, Pensacola Bay area including Santa Rosa Sound, Perdido Bay, and Mississippi Sound, Alabama.

=== Cities ===
This WFO office serves Pensacola, Florida, Mobile, Alabama, Evergreen, Alabama, and Destin, Florida.
