= 2017 Guam false civil danger warning =

- Date: August 15, 2017
- Time: 12:25 a.m. (ChST)
- Duration: 15 minutes
- Location: Guam, United States
- Type: False alarm

Near midnight on August 15, 2017, an accidental civil danger warning was broadcast on two radio stations and at least one television station in Guam. This caused alarm during heightened tensions with North Korea, who had threatened to fire missiles towards Guam. Later, Guam Homeland Security/Office of Civil Defense clarified it was an unauthorized test, attributing it to human error.

== Incident ==
At 12:25 a.m. Chamorro Standard Time, KTWG and KSTO broadcast a civil danger warning for Guam, which was additionally broadcast on at least one television station. It did not specify what the cause was and lasted 15 minutes.

At the time, tensions with North Korea—who had threatened to fire missiles towards Guam—were heightened. Residents were alarmed by the warning, some of whom called Guam Homeland Security/Office of Civil Defense and the police.

Later, Guam Homeland Security/Office of Civil Defense clarified it was an unscheduled and unauthorized test not related to an emergency, attributing it to human error. They also stated that they had worked with the two stations "to ensure the human error will not occur again." North Korean leader Kim Jong Un also had backed away from plans to launch missiles towards Guam.

== See also ==
- 2018 Hawaii false missile alert – A false missile threat that occurred in Hawaii a year later
- 2013 Emergency Alert System hijackings – A mass false activation of the Emergency Alert System
- 2005 Connecticut false evacuation alert – A false evacuation warning in Connecticut
- Civil danger warning
