= Emergency Alert System =

Method of emergency broadcasting in the United States

- Type: Emergency warning system
- Country: United States
- TV stations: All broadcast television stations and cable systems
- Radio stations: 77 designated Primary Entry Point (PEP) stations. All commercial radio stations
- Broadcast area: Varies; nationwide for national activation, limited to 31 locations at a time for regional activation, including counties, parishes, boroughs (any other equivalents), entire states, Washington, D.C., and territories
- Launch date: January 1, 1997; 29 years ago
- Replaced: Emergency Broadcast System

The Emergency Alert System (EAS) is a national warning system in the United States designed to allow authorized officials to broadcast emergency alerts and warning messages to the public via cable, satellite and broadcast television and AM, FM and satellite radio. Informally, Emergency Alert System is sometimes conflated with its mobile phone counterpart Wireless Emergency Alerts (WEA), a different but related system. However, both the EAS and WEA, among other systems, are coordinated under the Integrated Public Alert and Warning System (IPAWS).

The EAS, and more broadly IPAWS, allows federal, state, and local authorities to efficiently broadcast emergency alert and warning messages across multiple channels. The EAS became operational on January 1, 1997, after being approved by the Federal Communications Commission (FCC) in November 1994, replacing the Emergency Broadcast System (EBS), and largely supplanted similar local Emergency Override Systems, though the latter is still used from time to time. Its main improvement over the EBS, and perhaps its most distinctive feature, is its application of a digitally encoded audio signal known as Specific Area Message Encoding (SAME), which is responsible for the "screeching" or "beeping" sounds at the start and end of each message. The first signal is the "header" which encodes, among other information, the alert type and locations, or the specific area that should receive the message. The last short burst marks the end-of-message. These signals are read by specialized encoder-decoder equipment. This design allows for automated station-to-station relay of alerts to only the area the alert was intended for.

Like the Emergency Broadcast System, the system is primarily designed to allow the president of the United States to address the country via all radio and television stations in the event of a national emergency. Despite this, neither the system nor its predecessors have been used in this manner. The ubiquity of news coverage in these situations, such as during the September 11 attacks, has been credited to making usage of the system unnecessary or redundant. In practice, it is used at a regional scale to distribute information regarding imminent threats to public safety, such as severe weather situations (including flash floods and tornadoes), Amber alerts, and other civil emergencies.

It is jointly coordinated by the Federal Emergency Management Agency (FEMA), the FCC, and the National Oceanic and Atmospheric Administration (NOAA). The EAS regulations and standards are governed by the Public Safety and Homeland Security Bureau of the FCC. All broadcast television, broadcast and satellite radio stations, as well as multichannel video programming distributors (MVPDs), are required to participate in the system.

== Technical concept ==
Messages in the EAS are composed of four parts: a digitally encoded Specific Area Message Encoding (SAME) header, an attention signal, an audio announcement, and a digitally encoded end-of-message marker. (The 3 last beeps)

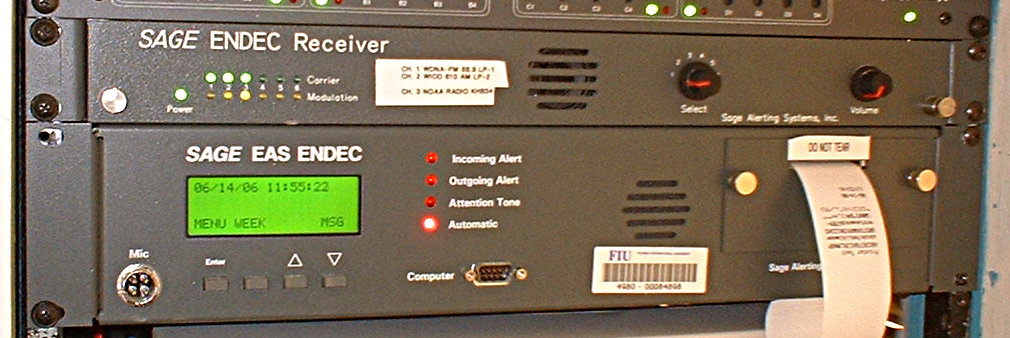
A Sage EAS ENDEC unit

The SAME header is the most critical part of the EAS design. It contains information about who originated the alert (the president, state or local authorities, the National Weather Service (NOAA/NWS), or the broadcaster), a short, general description of the event (tornado, flood, severe thunderstorm), the areas affected (up to 32 counties or states), the expected duration of the event (in minutes), the date and time it was issued (in UTC), and an identification of the originating station.

There are 79 radio stations designated as National Primary Stations in the Primary Entry Point (PEP) System to distribute presidential messages to other broadcast stations and cable systems.

The National Emergency Message (formerly known as the Emergency Action Notification) is the notice to broadcasters that the president of the United States or their designee will deliver a message over the EAS via the PEP system. The government has stated that the system would allow a president to speak during a national emergency within 10 minutes.

List of Primary Entry Point stations
Operational area	Station	Ref.
National	NPR, PRN, SXM	
United States Virgin Islands	WSTA	
Puerto Rico	WKAQ	
Maine	WGAN	
New Hampshire, Vermont, Massachusetts, Rhode Island	WBZ	
Connecticut	WTIC	
New York City, New Jersey	WABC	
Northeast New York	WROW	
South Central New York	WBNW-FM	
North Central New York	WHEN	
Western New York	WHAM	
Delaware, Eastern Pennsylvania	WTEL, WHYY-FM	
Western Pennsylvania	KDKA	
West Virginia	WCHS	
Maryland	WBAL	
District of Columbia	WFED	
Eastern Virginia	WTAR	
Central Virginia	WRXL	
Western Virginia	WPLY	
Eastern North Carolina	WSFL-FM	
Central North Carolina	WQDR-FM	
Western North Carolina	WBT	
Upstate South Carolina	WKVG	
Downstate South Carolina	WCOS-FM	
Georgia	WMAC, WSRV	
North Florida	WOKV	
Central Florida	WFLF	
South Florida	WAQI	
Alabama	WJOX	
Mississippi	WMSI-FM	
East Tennessee	WJCW, WJXB-FM	
Middle Tennessee, Southwest Indiana	WSM	
West Tennessee	WREC	
Kentucky, Southwest Ohio, Southeast Indiana	WLW	
Northeast Ohio	WTAM	
Michigan	WJR	
Northwest Indiana, Northern Illinois	WLS	
Southern Illinois, Eastern Missouri	KMOX	
Wisconsin	WTMJ	
Minnesota	WCCO	
Iowa	WHO	
Central Missouri	KTXY	
Western Missouri	WHB	
Arkansas	KAAY	
Southeast Louisiana	WWL	
Northwest Louisiana	KWKH	
Central Texas	KLBJ	
North Texas	WBAP, KSCS	
Southeast Texas	KTRH	
West Texas	KROD	
Oklahoma	KRMG, KOKC	
Nebraska	KRVN	
North Dakota, South Dakota (secondary)	KFYR	
Montana	KERR	
Wyoming	KTWO	
Colorado, South Dakota (primary)	KOA	
New Mexico	KKOB	
Arizona	KDRI	
Utah	KSL	
Idaho	KBOI	
Northern Nevada	KKOH	
Southern Nevada	KXNT	
San Diego area	KOGO	
Southern California	KFI, KNX	
Central California	KMJ	
Northern California	KCBS	
Hawaii	HEMA	
American Samoa	WVUV-FM	
Guam and Northern Marianas	KTWG	
Oregon	KOPB-FM, KPNW	
Washington	KIRO	
Alaska	KFQD	

=== Primary Entry Point stations ===
The National Public Warning System, also known as the Primary Entry Point (PEP) stations, is a network of 77 radio stations that are, in coordination with FEMA, used to originate emergency alert and warning information to the public before, during, and after incidents and disasters. PEP stations are equipped with additional and backup communications equipment and power generators designed to enable them to continue broadcasting information to the public during and after an event.

Beginning with WJR Detroit and WLW Cincinnati in 2016, FEMA began the process of constructing transportable studio shelters at the transmitters of 33 PEP stations, which feature broadcasting equipment, emergency provisions, a rest area, and an air filtration system. NPWS project manager Manny Centeno explained that these shelters were designed to "[expand] the survivability of these stations to include an all hazards platform, which means chemical, biological, radiological air protection and protection from electromagnetic pulse."

=== Communication links ===
The FEMA National Radio System (FNARS) "Provides Primary Entry Point service to the Emergency Alert System", and acts as an emergency presidential link into the EAS. The FNARS net control station is located at the Mount Weather Emergency Operations Center.

Once an EAN is received by an EAS participant from a PEP station (or any other participant) the message then "daisy chains" through the network of participants. "Daisy chains" form when one station receives a message from multiple other stations and the station then forwards that message to multiple other stations. This process creates many redundant paths through which the message may flow, increasing the likelihood that the message will be received by all participants and adding to the survivability of the system. Each EAS participant is required to monitor at least two other participants.

=== EAS header ===
Because the header lacks error detection codes, it is repeated three times for redundancy. EAS decoders compare the received headers against one another, looking for an exact match between any two, eliminating most errors that can cause an activation to fail. The decoder then decides whether to ignore the message or to relay it on the air if the message applies to the local area served by the station (following parameters set by the broadcaster).

The SAME header bursts are followed by an EAS attention tone, which lasts between 8 and 25 seconds, depending on the originating station. The tone is 1,050 Hz on a NOAA Weather Radio station. On commercial broadcast stations, a "two-tone" attention signal of 853 Hz and 960 Hz sine waves is used instead, the same signal used by the older Emergency Broadcast System. These tones have become infamous, and can be considered both frightening and annoying by listeners; in fact, the two tones, which form approximately the interval of a just major second at an unusually high pitch, were chosen specifically for their ability to draw attention, due to their unpleasantness on the human ear. The SAME header is equally known for its shrillness, which many have found to be startling. These tones are illegal to play on television or radio when there is not an actual emergency; doing so would result in disciplinary action or be fined for misuse or unauthorized playback of the tones (see "Tone usage outside of alerts" section below). The "two-tone" system is no longer required as of 1998, and is to be used only for audio alerts before EAS messages. Like the EBS, the attention signal is followed by a voice message describing the details of the alert.

The message ends with 3 bursts of the AFSK "EOM", or End of Message, which is the text NNNN, preceded each time by the binary 10101011 calibration.

=== IPAWS ===
Under a 2006 executive order issued by George W. Bush, the U.S. government was instructed to create "an effective, reliable, integrated, flexible, and comprehensive" public warning system. This was accomplished via expansions to the aforementioned PEP network, and the development of the Integrated Public Alert and Warning System (IPAWS)—a national aggregator and distributor of alert information using the XML-based Common Alerting Protocol (CAP) and an Internet network. IPAWS can be used to distribute alert information to EAS participants, supported mobile phones (Wireless Emergency Alerts), and other platforms. IPAWS also allows the audio portion of an EAS message to utilize higher quality digital audio, rather than needing to carry the audio off-air from the originating station.

Under an FCC report and order issued in 2007, EAS participants would be required to migrate to digital equipment supporting CAP within 180 days of the specification's adoption by FEMA. This was originally scheduled for September 30, 2010, but the deadline was later delayed to June 30, 2012 at the request of broadcasters.

The FCC has established that IPAWS is not a full substitute for the SAME protocol, as it is vulnerable to situations that may make internet connectivity unavailable. Therefore, as a backup distribution path, broadcasters must also convert CAP messages to SAME headers to enable backwards compatibility with the existing "daisy chain" method of EAS distribution.

In September 2022, the FCC implemented a new requirement for the display of alert audio and text from CAP messages to be prioritized, in order to provide higher quality alert audio, improve parity between the visual display and audio for the benefit of the hearing impaired, and to reduce the amount of technical jargon contained within the visual display. The deadline was scheduled for December 12, 2023; the FCC later granted a 90-day extension to broadcasters using equipment from the decoder vendor Sage, due to delays the company faced in releasing the necessary software updates.

== Station requirements ==
The FCC requires all broadcast stations and multichannel video programming distributors (MVPD), hereafter "EAS participants", to install and maintain FCC-certified EAS decoders and encoders at their control points or headends. These decoders continuously monitor the signals from other nearby broadcast stations for EAS messages. For reliability, at least two source stations must be monitored, one of which must be a designated local primary. Participants are to retain the latest version of the EAS handbook.

EAS participants are required by federal law to relay National Emergency Messages (EAN, formerly Emergency Action Notification) immediately (47 CFR Part 11.54). Broadcasters traditionally have been allowed to opt out of relaying other alerts such as severe weather, and child abduction emergencies (Amber alerts) if they so choose. In practice, many television stations usually interrupt regularly-scheduled programming during newsworthy situations (such as severe weather) to provide coverage from their local news departments.

If possible, EAS participants must transmit the audio, and (where applicable) a visual display containing the extended text, from the associated CAP message.

EAS participants are required to keep logs of all received messages. Logs may be kept by hand but are usually kept automatically by a small receipt printer in the encoder/decoder unit. Logs may also be kept electronically inside the unit as long as there is access to an external printer or method to transfer them to a computer.

== System tests ==
All EAS equipment must be tested on a weekly basis. The required weekly test (RWT) consists, at a minimum, of the header and end-of-message tones. Though an RWT does not need an audio or graphic message announcing the test, many stations provide them as a courtesy to the public. In addition, television stations are not required to transmit a video message for weekly tests. RWTs are scheduled by the station on random days and times, though quite often during late night or early afternoon hours, and are generally not relayed.

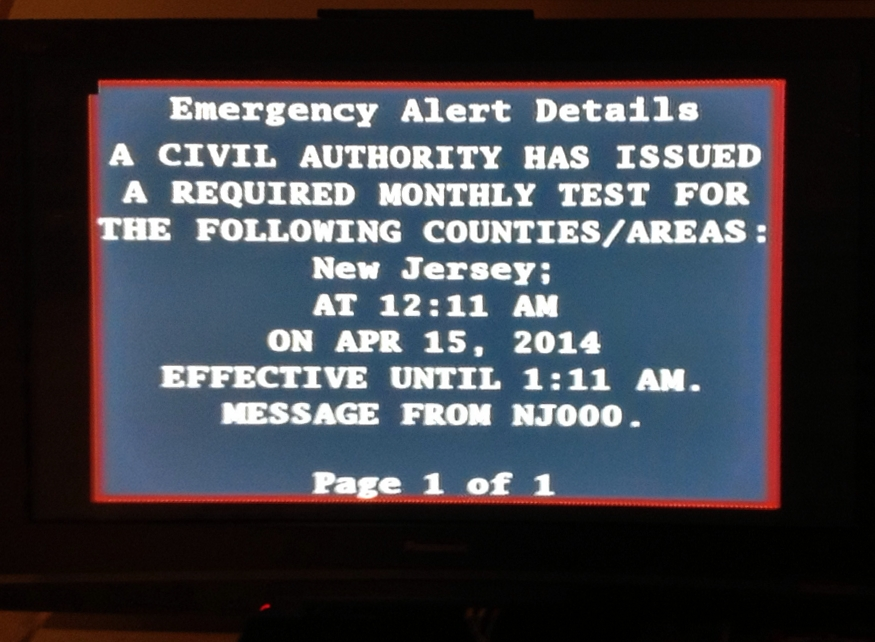
A Required Monthly Test (RMT) transmitted in New Jersey on April 15, 2014, as shown on a television set

Required monthly tests (RMTs) are generally originated by the local or state primary station, a state emergency management agency, or by the National Weather Service and are then relayed by broadcast stations and cable channels. RMTs must be performed between 8:30 a.m. and local sunset during odd numbered months, and between local sunset and 8:30 a.m. during even-numbered months. Received monthly tests must be retransmitted within 60 minutes of receipt. Additionally, an RMT should not be scheduled or conducted during an event of great importance such as a pre-announced presidential speech, coverage of a national/local election, major local or national news coverage outside regularly scheduled newscast hours or a major national sporting event such as the Super Bowl or World Series, with other events such as the Indianapolis 500 and Olympic Games mentioned in individual EAS state plans.

An RWT is not required during a calendar week in which an RMT is scheduled. No testing has to be done during a calendar week in which all parts of the EAS (header burst, attention signal, audio message, and end of message burst) have been legitimately activated.

In July 2018, in response to the aftermath of the false missile alert in Hawaii earlier in the year (which was caused by operator error during an internal drill protocol), the FCC announced that it would take steps to promote public awareness and improve efficiency of the system, including requiring safeguards to prevent distribution of false alarms, the ability to authorize "live code" tests—which would simulate the process and response to an actual emergency, and authorizations to use the EAS tones in public service announcements that promote awareness of the system.

=== Nationwide tests ===
A National Periodic Test (NPT), currently known as a Nationwide Test of the Emergency Alert System since 2022, is an Emergency Alert System test that is conducted nationwide every year by the United States Government and the FCC.

== Additions and proposals ==
The number of event types in the national system has grown to eighty. At first, all but three of the events (civil emergency message, immediate evacuation, and emergency action notification [national emergency]) were weather-related (such as a tornado warning). Since then, several classes of non-weather emergencies have been added, including, in most states, the Amber alert System for child abduction emergencies. In 2016, three additional weather alert codes were authorized for use in relation to hurricane events, including Extreme Wind Warning (EWW), Storm Surge Warning (SSW) and Storm Surge Watch (SSA).

In 2004, the FCC issued a Notice of Proposed Rulemaking (NPRM) seeking comment on whether EAS in its present form is the most effective mechanism for warning the American public of an emergency and, if not, on how EAS can be improved, such as mandatory text messages to cellphones, regardless of subscription. As noted above, rules implemented by the FCC on July 12, 2007 provisionally endorse incorporating CAP with the SAME protocol.

In November 2020, Congress passed the Reliable Emergency Alert Distribution Improvement (READI) Act. First sponsored by Hawaii Senator Brian Schatz in response to the Hawaii false missile alert, it amends the Warning, Alert, and Response Network (WARN) Act to require distribution of wireless alerts issued by the administrator of FEMA, and commands the FCC to establish a means of reporting false alerts, encourage the establishment of State Emergency Communications Committees (SECC) that would meet annually to evaluate their EAS plans, require the repetition of alerts surrounding "emergencies of national significance", and open an inquiry into the feasibility of implementing the EAS on internet-related services.

== Limitations ==
The EAS can only be used to relay audio messages that preempt all programming; as the intent of an Emergency Action Notification is to serve as a "last-ditch effort to get a message out if the president cannot get to the media", it can easily be made redundant by the immediate and constant coverage that major weather events and other newsworthy situations—such as, most prominently, the September 11 attacks in 2001—receive from television broadcasters and cable news channels. Following the attacks, then-FCC chairman Michael K. Powell cited "the ubiquitous media environment" as justification for not using the EAS in their immediate aftermath. Glenn Collins of The New York Times acknowledged these limitations, noting that "no president has ever used the current [EAS] system or its technical predecessors in the last 50 years, despite the Soviet missile crisis, a presidential assassination, the Oklahoma City bombing, major earthquakes and three recent high-alert terrorist warnings", and that using it would have actually hindered the availability of live coverage from media outlets.

Following the tornado outbreak of March 3, 2019, Birmingham, Alabama NWS meteorologist Kevin Laws told CNN that he, personally, wished that alerts could be updated in real-time in order to reflect the unpredictable nature of weather events, noting that the storm system's unexpected change in trajectory towards Lee County resulted in only a nine-minute warning (the resulting tornado would kill 23 people).

Viewers' lessened use of broadcast media in favor of streaming video services has led to concerns that this would inhibit their ability to receive emergency information (notwithstanding availability of alerts on mobile phones). The READI Act called for an inquiry into the distribution of alerts via internet platforms.

== Incidents ==
=== False alarms ===
- On April 21, 1997, several television and radio stations in Florida, Hawaii, Louisiana, and Ohio mistakenly received a false Emergency Action Notification. Early indications pointed to a human error at the National Emergency Coordination Center in Virginia that routed a test requested by a relay for the Chicago Metropolitan Area to test out one radio station's then-new EAS equipment as part of the EBS/EAS transition.
- On February 1, 2005 in Connecticut, an alert was mistakenly issued calling for the immediate evacuation of the entire state. The alert contained no specific detail on why it had been issued. The message was broadcast due to operator error while conducting an unannounced, but scheduled statewide test. A study conducted following the incident reported that at least 11% of residents actually saw the warning live, and that 63% of those surveyed were "a little or not at all concerned"—citing a suspicious lack of detail in the message, which a legitimate alert would include. Only 1% of those surveyed actually attempted to leave the state. Connecticut State Police did not receive any calls related to the incident.
- On June 26, 2007 at 7:35 a.m. CDT, an EAN was accidentally issued in Illinois, when a new satellite receiver at the state's EOC was accidentally connected to a live system before final internal testing of the new delivery path had been completed. The alert was followed by dead air, and then audio from designated station 720 WGN in Chicago being simulcast across almost every television and radio station in the Chicago area and throughout much of Illinois. A confused Spike O'Dell, host of the station's morning show at the time, was heard on-air wondering "what that beeping was all about".
- On May 19, 2010, NOAA Weather Radio and CSEPP tone alert radios in the Hermiston, Oregon area, near the Umatilla Chemical Depot, were activated with an EAS alert shortly after 5 p.m. The message transmitted was for a severe thunderstorm warning, issued by the National Weather Service in Pendleton, but the transmission broadcast instead was a long period of silence, followed by a few words in Spanish. Umatilla County Emergency Management stressed that there was no emergency at the depot.
- On September 3, 2016, in the wake of Tropical Storm Hermine, an alert was displayed on television calling for the immediate evacuation of the entirety of Suffolk County, abruptly ending with the incomplete sentence "This is an emergency message from". About 15 minutes after the original message was sent, the alert was re-issued with an addendum clarifying that the alert was actually calling for a voluntary evacuation of Fire Island—a barrier island of Long Island. Officials cited an error in the county's Code Red system; while the correct message was entered into the system, an error processing an abbreviated message for television resulted in the error.
- On May 23, 2017, at around 8:55 p.m. EDT, a Nuclear Power Plant Warning was issued for the Hope Creek and Salem Nuclear Power Plants. The alert was issued for Salem and Cumberland counties in New Jersey. In a statement by the New Jersey State Police, it was a test message, intended for a small group of emergency management personnel who were participating in the test. Due to a coding error, the message was publicly broadcast. This would happen again in July 2022.
- On August 15, 2017 at approximately 12:25 a.m. ChST, Guam stations KTWG and KSTO transmitted a civil danger warning for the island; Guam Homeland Security described the message, which interrupted programming on the stations, and was received on television by some viewers, as being an "unauthorized test" of the EAS. The incident's impact was strengthened, as North Korea had threatened the launch of ballistic missiles towards Guam only a few days beforehand. Numerous calls to 911 operators and the Department of Homeland Security were made following the broadcast.

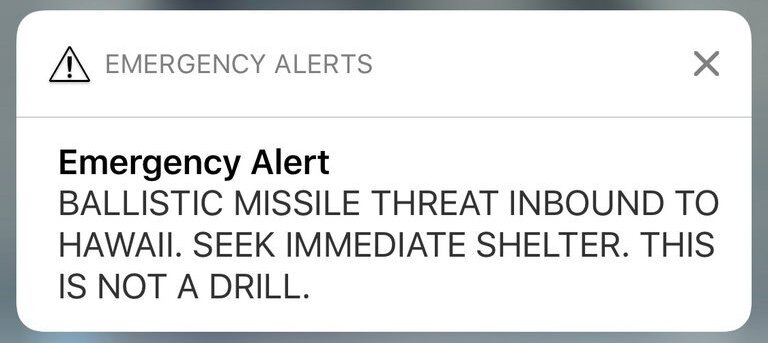
On January 13, 2018, a false alarm was issued warning of a missile threat to Hawaii.

- On January 13, 2018 at approximately 8:07 a.m. HST, the Hawaii Emergency Management Agency (HI-EMA) mistakenly issued an emergency alert warning of a ballistic missile inbound threatening the region, which was claimed to be not a drill. 38 minutes later, it was announced by HI-EMA and the Honolulu Police Department that the alert was a false alarm. The incident came amidst heightened concern over the possibility that Hawaii could be targeted by North Korean missiles (in December 2017, Hawaii tested its missile sirens for the first time since the Cold War). HI-EMA administrator Vern Miyagi stated that the incident was a "mistake made during a standard procedure at the change over of a shift".
- On August 31, 2022, amid wildfires, an immediate evacuation notice for the Castiac, California area, which was issued by the Los Angeles County Office of Emergency Management and transmitted over NOAA Weather Radio, was mistakenly sent out to include the Eastern North Pacific Ocean and Port Conception to Guadalupe; the alert text repeatedly listed "Eastern North Pacific Ocean" or "Eastern North Pacific" twelve different times. Although a real emergency had occurred, the Ventura County Sheriff's Office stated that the alert had been issued for those areas in error.

=== Cybersecurity breaches ===
EAS equipment has been the subject of various cyberattacks, caused primarily by participants using insecure or factory default passwords on their encoders and decoders, and outdated software containing unpatched vulnerabilities. On multiple occasions, federal government departments have warned that failure to employ secure passwords and keep software updated made EAS equipment vulnerable to such attacks, which could result in disruptions such as false alerts.

- In February 2013, the EAS equipment of several stations in Great Falls, Montana and Marquette, Michigan were breached to play a false alert allegedly warning of a zombie apocalypse, using the lines "Civil authorities in your area have reported that the bodies of the dead are rising from the graves and attacking the living", It was identified that the attack had come from an "overseas" source. Furthermore, the broadcasters had neglected to change the factory default logins or passwords on their equipment. Because of this, the FCC, FEMA, equipment manufacturers, as well as trade groups, including the Michigan Association of Broadcasters, urged broadcasters to change their passwords and to recheck their security measures.
  - In a related incident, WIZM-FM in La Crosse, Wisconsin accidentally triggered the EAS on television station WKBT-DT by airing a recording of the false message during its morning show. The relayed audio included the hosts' reactions and laughter to the clip.
- On February 28, 2017, WZZY in Winchester, Indiana was hijacked in a nearly identical manner, playing the same "dead bodies" audio from the February 2013 incidents. The incident prompted a public response from the Randolph County Sheriff's Department clarifying that there was no actual emergency.
- In January 2020, Security Ledger published an investigation finding that at least 50 EAS decoders by Digital Alert Systems had not been patched for a security vulnerability (use of a shared SSH key) found by IOActive in 2013.
- On February 20, 2020, the EAS equipment of Washington-based provider Wave Broadband was hijacked, causing approximately 3,000 customers in Jefferson County to receive several false alerts (including a "Radiological Hazard Warning"), which contained irrelevant and comedic messages (including one that said "CHANGE YOUR PASSWORDS PEPEGA CLAP") and alert audio referencing internet memes with a message that said "SUB TO VINESAUCE ON TWITCH twitch.tv/vinesauce," who was unaffiliated with this message. On March 2 and 3, 2020, a legitimate Required Monthly Test was displayed with a message ("AIGHT IM DONE U CAN REST NOW. MR GERDE WAS HERE") that had also appeared in the hijack. A company official stated that this was a remnant of the attack that had not yet been removed.

=== Tone usage outside of alerts ===
To protect the integrity of the system, and prevent false activations, the FCC prohibits the use of actual or simulated EAS/WEA tones and attention signals outside of genuine alerts, tests, or authorized public service announcements, especially when they are used "to capture audience attention during advertisements; dramatic, entertainment, and educational programs" (even if the footage is documentation of an event where an actual alert was issued). Broadcasters who misuse the tones may be sanctioned (including being required to partake in compliance measures) and fined.

- American heavy metal band Anthrax used the attention tones at the beginning of their song "Fight 'Em Till You Can't" from their 2011 album Worship Music. The spoken lines right after the attention tones are taken from a zombie apocalypse EAS alert video on YouTube. Audio from this same video was also used in the 2013 Emergency Alert System hijackings.
- Tones from the EAS were used in the trailer for the 2013 film Olympus Has Fallen; cable providers were fined $1.9 million by the Federal Communications Commission (FCC) on March 3, 2014, for misuse of EAS tones. An event similar to this previously occurred in November 2013, when TBS was fined $25,000 for the use of EAS tones in a Conan advertisement.
- During the October 24, 2014 episode of the syndicated radio show The Bobby Bones Show, host Bobby Bones played audio from the 2011 national test as part of a rant about a genuine test from Nashville's Fox affiliate, WZTV, that interrupted Game 2 of the 2014 World Series on October 22. The errant Emergency Action Notification was relayed to some broadcasters and cable systems—particularly those not configured to reject EAN messages that did not match the current date. On May 19, 2015, iHeartMedia, who distributes the show and owns its flagship station WSIX-FM, was fined $1 million for the incident. The company was also ordered to implement a three-year compliance plan to avoid any further incidents, including removing all EAS tones or similar-sounding noises from its audio production libraries.
- From August 4 to 6, 2016, Tegna, Inc.-owned NBC affiliate WTLV in Jacksonville, Florida aired an ad several times during NBC's primetime coverage of the 2016 Summer Olympics produced by the marketing department of the National Football League's Jacksonville Jaguars featuring out-of-sequence EAS tones over Jaguars training camp footage and a voiceover noting "this is not a test, this is an emergency broadcast transmission...seek shelter immediately", along with the on-screen text "the storm is coming". The ad aired four times before station compliance authorities pulled the advertisement after the local news industry blog FTVLive criticized the station for carrying it, especially during the peak of the Atlantic hurricane season. FTVLive's piece would be noted by the FCC in their decision against WTLV rendered on May 30, 2017, when it was given a $55,000 fine for carrying the offending Jaguars ad.
- The FCC issued several fines relating to EAS tone usage in August 2019, including ABC being fined $395,000 for using wireless emergency alert tones multiple times during a Jimmy Kimmel Live sketch, AMC Networks being fined $104,000 for using the tones in The Walking Dead episode "Omega", Discovery Inc. being fined $68,000 for including footage of an actual WEA activation during a Lone Star Law episode filmed during Hurricane Harvey, and Meruelo Group was fined $61,000 for including an EAS-like tone during a radio advertisement for KDAY and KDEY-FM's morning show.
- On September 9, 2019, the FCC proposed a $272,000 fine against CBS for using simulated EAS tones in the Young Sheldon episode, "A Mother, A Child, and a Blue Man's Backside". CBS defended the statement, saying that the tones' usage was a "dramatic portrayal", and that it was an "integral part of the storyline about a family's visceral reaction to a life-threatening emergency". The show's sound editors achieved the effect by downloading EAS tones from YouTube and modifying the volume of the tone. CBS passed the edited tone through three quality rooms equipped with EAS decoders and pre-screened the episode to make sure it did not trigger an actual alert. Also, the show's dialogue was used to obscure some elements of the alert. However, the FCC insisted that the modified tone still sounded like a normal EAS tone, despite the volume being lowered and the tone being cut short in duration. It also said that the pre-screening process did not excuse an unauthorized usage of the EAS tones.
- On April 7, 2020, the FCC proposed a $20,000 fine against New York City radio station WNEW-FM, for using the attention signal during its morning show on October 3, 2018 as part of a skit discussing the National Periodic Test held later that day.
- In January 2023, the FCC proposed a $504,000 fine against Fox Corporation for misusing the EAS tones during a promo broadcast on Fox NFL Sunday in November 2021.
- On October 17, 2024, the FCC proposed a $146,976 fine against ESPN for misusing the EAS tones during a promotional segment for the start of the 2023–24 NBA season that aired during the week of October 20–24, 2023.

In an opposite move, in 2013 the FCC granted a one-year waiver for a PSA pertaining to the Wireless Emergency Alerts system, with assurance that the tones used in the PSA contained a different set of codes designed not to activate EAS receivers.

=== Testing errors ===
- On October 19, 2008, KWVE-FM in San Clemente, California accidentally initiated a Required Monthly Test when it meant to conduct a Required Weekly Test. Furthermore, an operator aborted the test mid-way through the broadcast (failing to broadcast the end-of-message tone), causing all area outlets to broadcast KWVE-FM's programming until those stations took their equipment offline. On September 15, 2009, the FCC fined the station's owner, Calvary Chapel Costa Mesa, $5,000. After the fine was levied, various state broadcast associations in the United States submitted joint letters to the FCC, protesting against the fine, saying that the commission could have handled the matter better. On November 13, 2009, the FCC rescinded its fine against KWVE-FM, but had still admonished the station for broadcasting an unauthorized RMT, as well as omitting the code to end the test.
- On November 9, 2011, DirecTV viewers were shown the Nationwide Test that occurred that day, but after the message, the EOM tones were somehow omitted, and viewers saw the emergency alert screen, paired with the audio of Lady Gaga's Paparazzi, which occurred because of how DirecTV works. When a station stops airing, viewers tuned into that station via DirecTV are shown music. Emergency Alert System broadcasts are then put over that music, which comes back on after the message. In this case, given the omission of the EOM tones, the alerting screen remained, but the music was shown to viewers, thus leading to viewers seeing the screen paired with Paparazzi.
- On September 28, 2016, an emergency alert was broadcast by WKTV in Utica, New York that contained a Hazardous Materials Warning for the entire United States. The message contained a non-sequitur quote from the Dr. Seuss book Green Eggs and Ham, "Would you. Could you. On a train?" WKTV apologized and stated that the alert was "an automated test [from FEMA] which was not intended for public display." A FEMA representative stated that its decoders had been mistakenly "configured to poll a test and development message aggregator instead of or in addition to the production message aggregator", with the test server having used the Green Eggs and Ham quote as placeholder text. The error was also connected to conspiracy theories surrounding a train crash in New Jersey that occurred the next day, which claimed that the alert was a forewarning of the incident.
- On September 21, 2017, a technical glitch in another scheduled test by KWVE caused the end-of-message tone to be omitted, causing regional participants (particularly Charter and Cox Cable systems in Orange County) to simulcast a portion of Chuck Swindoll's Insight for Living program. Some viewers speculated that the system had been hijacked, as the portion of the program relayed (where Swindoll was discussing the Bible verse 2 Timothy 3:1, and stated, "Realize this, extremely violent times will come.") could be insinuated out of context as discussing an impending apocalypse.
- On January 22, 2025, the FCC proposed a $369,190 fine against KCWX in Fredericksburg, Texas for failing to properly transmit the nationwide EAS tests in 2018, 2019 and 2021. The FCC accused the station of numerous violations of EAS regulations, including rebroadcasting alert tones from previous years, simulating test messages instead of the authorized test message, and falsely claiming to have properly received the tests when it had not.. Corridor Television, which owns KCWX, entered into a consent decree with the FCC in August 2026, agreeing to make a $27,000 "voluntary contribution" and implement an EAS compliance plan.

== See also ==
- AusAlert (Australia)
- Alert Ready (Canada)
- Cell Broadcast
- Digital Emergency Alert System (DEAS)
- Earthquake Early Warning (Japan)
- Emergency override system
- Emergency population warning
- Emergency Public Warning System
- Flash Flood Guidance Systems
- HANDEL (UK's former National Attack Warning System)
- ICANN's TEAC (Transfer Emergency Action Contact) channel in cases of URL hijacking
- J-Alert (Japan)
- Mexican Seismic Alert System (Mexico's Earthquake Early Warning System, which also employs Specific Area Message Encoding technology)
- National Severe Weather Warning Service
- National Warning System
- NOAA Weather Radio
- Nuclear football
- Nuclear MASINT
- Radio Amateur Civil Emergency Service
- ShakeAlert
- Specific Area Message Encoding
- Standard Emergency Warning Signal (Australia)
- Wartime Broadcasting Service
- Weatheradio Canada
- Wireless Emergency Alerts (WEA)
