= WKBT-DT =

Television station in La Crosse, Wisconsin

- La Crosse–Eau Claire, Wisconsin; United States
- City: La Crosse, Wisconsin
- Channels: Digital: 8 (VHF); Virtual: 8
- Branding: News 8 Now

Programming
- Affiliations: 8.1: CBS; 8.2: Independent with MyNetworkTV; for others, see § Subchannels

Ownership
- Owner: Morgan Murphy Media; (QueenB Television, LLC)
- Sister stations: Madison: WISC-TV/TVW

History
- First air date: August 1, 1954
- Former call signs: WKBT (1954–2009)
- Former channel numbers: Analog: 8 (VHF, 1954–2009); Digital: 41 (UHF, 2003–2009)
- Former affiliations: All secondary: DuMont (1954–1955); NBC (1954–1958); ABC (1954–1970)
- Call sign meaning: Former TV sibling of WKBH Radio, which shared ownership with a music store that sold Kimball pianos (the store's slogan: "Kimball Brings Happiness")

Technical information
- Licensing authority: FCC
- Facility ID: 74424
- ERP: 25.7 kW
- HAAT: 464.9 m (1,525 ft)
- Transmitter coordinates: 44°5′28″N 91°20′17″W
- Translator(s): see § Translators

Links
- Public license information: Public file; LMS
- Website: www.news8000.com

WKBT-DT (channel 8) is a television station licensed to La Crosse, Wisconsin, United States, serving the La Crosse–Eau Claire market as an affiliate of CBS and MyNetworkTV. Owned by Morgan Murphy Media, the station maintains studios on South 6th Street in downtown La Crosse, and its transmitter is located on Silver Creek Road in Galesville, Wisconsin.

== History ==
WKBT signed-on August 1, 1954, as a sister station to WKBH radio (AM 1410, now WIZM). In the call sign, the "T" for "television" replaced the "H" to differentiate the stations. It originally carried programming from all four major networks (CBS, NBC, ABC, and DuMont) but has always been a primary CBS affiliate. It lost DuMont after that network shut down in 1956 and lost NBC in 1958 after La Crosse and Eau Claire were collapsed into a single market.

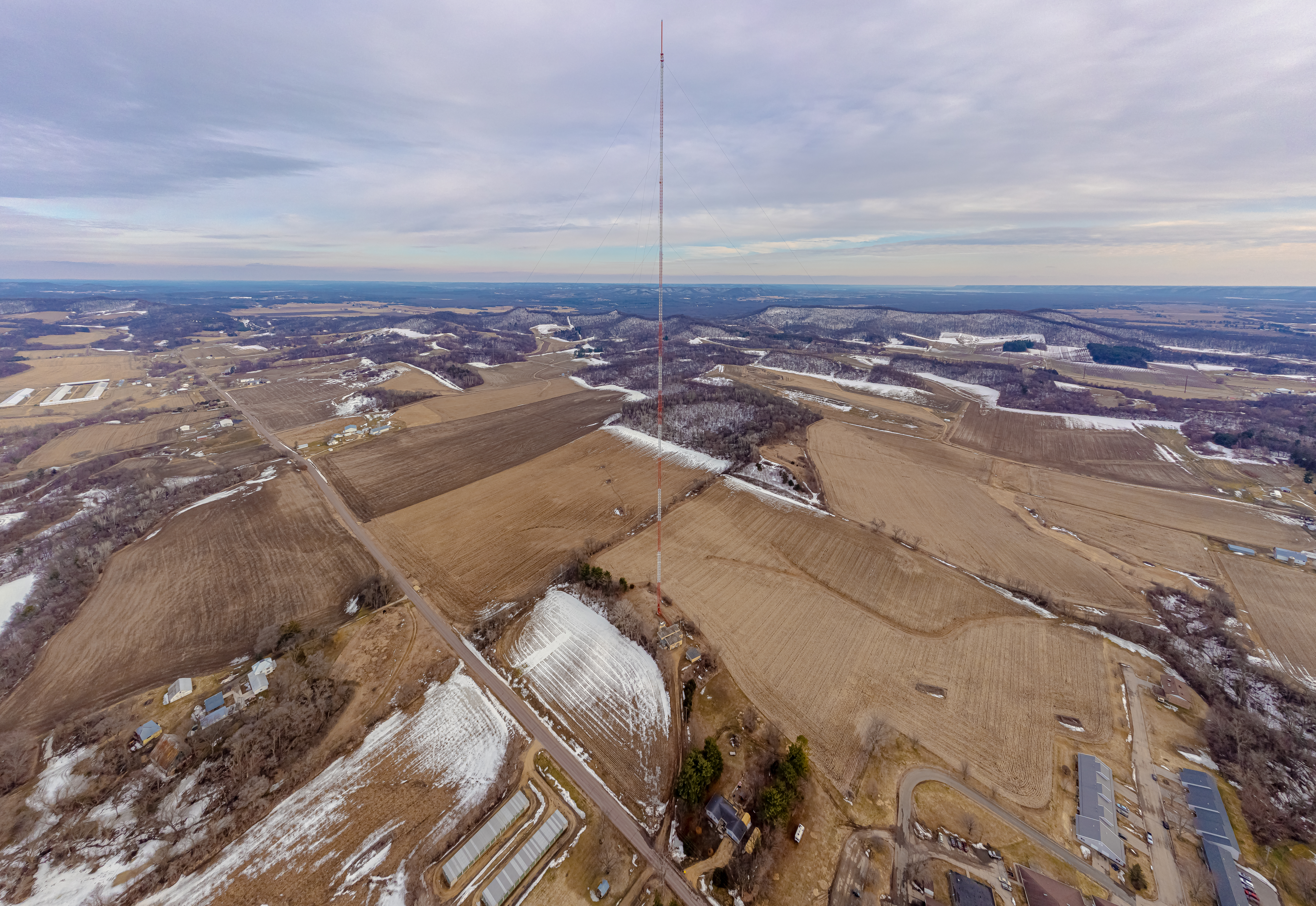
Galesville WKBT tower

WKBT then shared ABC with NBC affiliate WEAU-TV (channel 13, based in Eau Claire) until WXOW (channel 19) signed-on from La Crosse in 1970.

On April 16, 1965, during the worst of the famous 1965 flood, the downtown La Crosse building that housed both WKBT and WKBH burned to the ground; WKBT would rebuild its current building on the same site. WKBT was sold to Harold F. Gross, a businessman from Lansing, Michigan, in 1970, who owned WJIM-AM-FM-TV in that city. Gross Telecasting sold both stations to Backe Communications in 1984, following a licensing dispute involving WJIM-TV (which changed its call letters to WLNS-TV). Backe sold both stations to Young Broadcasting in 1986. In March 2000, Young sold WKBT to current owner Morgan Murphy Media (ironically, the founding original owner of WEAU-TV from 1953 to 1962).

Throughout its history, WKBT's news operation has tended to favor their news coverage on their home city of La Crosse, Winona, Minnesota, and the Coulee Region, with a secondary emphasis on Eau Claire and the Chippewa Valley, ceding to WEAU's geographical strength overall in Eau Claire. However, WKBT's weather coverage is balanced equally to cover the entire market.

WKBT's transmitter, in Galesville, is located about 30 miles (48 km) north of the channel 8 studios in order to provide a clear signal to the entire market. If put up next to Chicago's Willis Tower (formerly known as the Sears Tower), the WKBT transmitter would surpass the upper roof and fall just about 100 feet (30 m) short of the highest antenna on top.

On January 30, 2006, WKBT signed-on a new second digital subchannel to serve as the market's UPN affiliate. Class A station KQEG-CA had previously dropped its affiliation with the network at the end of the previous week. As a result of UPN and The WB merging in September 2006, ABC affiliate WXOW (and its semi-satellite WQOW) gained The CW affiliation on digital subchannels. This was a result of their association with The WB through a cable-only station ("WBCZ" on channel 15) through The WB 100+. Meanwhile, WKBT-DT2 joined the other new broadcast network, MyNetworkTV.

== News operation ==
WKBT presently broadcasts 34 hours of local newscasts each week (with six hours each weekday and two hours each on Saturdays and Sundays).

== Controversies ==
=== Jennifer Livingston fat shaming ===
In October 2012, WKBT was in the national spotlight when morning news anchor Jennifer Livingston addressed a viewer who criticized her about her weight and issued an on-air commentary about bullying and being a role model.

=== EAS intrusion incident ===
In the afternoon of February 11, 2013, WKBT-DT's Emergency Alert System was hijacked, airing a false Local Area Emergency message over the station's regular programming warning viewers of a zombie apocalypse. Multiple other television stations had their EAS system hijacking with the same message on the same day, including KRTV in Great Falls, Montana, WBUP and WNMU in Marquette, Michigan, and KENW in Portales, New Mexico.

== Technical information ==
=== Subchannels ===
The station's signal is multiplexed:

Subchannels of WKBT-DT
Channel	Res.	Short name	Programming
8.1	1080i	WKBT-HD	CBS
8.2	720p	WKBT-DT	Independent with MyNetworkTV
8.3	480i	ION	Ion
8.4	480i	DABL	Dabl
8.5	480i	QVC	QVC
8.6	480i	HSN	HSN

WKBT added digital subchannel 8.2 in January 2006, a channel originally affiliated with UPN before joining MyNetworkTV the following September; it launched with only a weekend's notice after KQEG-CD's UPN disaffiliation in the wake of the announcement of the UPN–WB merger into The CW. The station would add a second subchannel, affiliated with Ion in January 2017; a third subchannel, affiliated with Dabl, signed on in September 2019.

=== Analog-to-digital conversion ===
On March 28, 2003, WKBT signed on its digital signal on UHF channel 41. The station has been digital-only since February 17, 2009.

In the summer of 2011, WKBT became the first station in the market to air newscasts in 16:9 enhanced definition widescreen.

=== Translators ===
City of license	Callsign	Channel	ERP	HAAT	Facility ID	Transmitter coordinates
Elk Mound (Eau Claire)	W18FK-D	18	15 kW	106.5 m (349 ft)	130843	44°48′0.0″N 91°27′57.0″W
La Crescent, Minnesota (La Crosse)	KQEG-CD	23	15 kW	225 m (738 ft)	72207	43°44′53″N 91°17′51″W
Tomah	WPDR-LD	35	15 kW	232.4 m (762 ft)	39628	43°53′50″N 90°34′57″W
