= Vern Miyagi =

United States Army general

Vern T. Miyagi
- Allegiance: United States
- Branch: United States Army
- Rank: Major General
- Alma mater: University of Hawaiʻi

Vern T. Miyagi is a former administrator of the Hawaii Emergency Management Agency (HI-EMA) who was responsible for the day-to-day operations of HI-EMA from September 11, 2015 to January 30, 2018. Before that he was executive officer at HI-EMA. He is a retired United States Army major general with over 37 years service. In January 2018 he took responsibility for the false issue of a warning of nuclear attack on Hawaii even though it was not him who mistakenly issued the warning. He resigned on January 30, 2018, in response to the false alarm.
