= 2005 Connecticut false evacuation alert =

False evacuation alert for Connecticut, United States

On February 1, 2005, the Emergency Alert System was activated in portions of Connecticut calling for the immediate evacuation of the entire state. The activation was in error. Later studies showed that residents did not evacuate, and that the most common response was to "change the channel" or seek other confirmation.

== Background ==
The Emergency Alert System (EAS) is a public warning system in the United States that allows designated government authorities to suspend and preempt terrestrial radio and television broadcasts when needed to issue urgent public safety alerts. The highest priority alert that can be issued is an Emergency Action Notification (EAN), sometimes called a "presidential alert". An EAN sets into motion a series of events that causes all of the United States' television and radio stations to become networked together to simulcast the President of the United States, or another federal official. An Emergency Action Notification has never been used for an actual event. However, local and state-level activations of the EAS routinely occur for emergencies such as tornadoes, 911 system outages, and other, localized, exigent events.

== Incident ==
At 2:10 p.m. on Tuesday, February 1, 2005, a state-level activation of the EAS occurred in Connecticut. A scheduled, unannounced test of the system had been planned for that day. However, the system instead informed television and radio stations that an evacuation of the state was underway. Both the Connecticut Office of Emergency Management and Governor Jodi Rell issued statements shortly after the broadcast confirming the activation had been in error and there was no evacuation underway, though clarifications were not issued until more than an hour after the transmission.

Officials initially blamed hackers for the misactivation, though an employee of the state's Office of Emergency Management later said they had accidentally registered the incorrect code prior to what should have been an EAS test, prompting the broadcast of the evacuation notification instead of the test message.

According to media reports, the message broadcast began, "civil authorities have issued an immediate evacuation order for all of Connecticut, beginning at 2:10 p.m. and ending at 3:10 p.m."

== Reaction ==
Despite the critical nature of the message, officials from the Connecticut State Police reported they received no calls from the public inquiring as to its authenticity or the circumstances that would require the evacuation of Connecticut. Though some local police reportedly received calls from members of the public, the message "failed to set off a noticeable exodus into Massachusetts, Rhode Island or New York".

A study conducted after the activation discovered that 11 percent of the state's residents had received the warning while it was being broadcast. Of those persons, 63 percent reported they were "a little or not at all concerned" when receiving it. The most common reaction reported by residents was to seek confirmation of the emergency by changing channels; other common reactions were looking outside or consulting neighbors, and only one percent of persons surveyed who heard the broadcast actually attempted to flee Connecticut.

The most common reasons given by people for not following the evacuation orders were because no specific threat was described in the broadcast, because no specific area was mentioned other than "the entire state of Connecticut", and because there was no observable activity indicative of an emergency.

== See also ==
- 2018 Hawaii false missile alert
- 2020 Ontario nuclear incident alert
- 2017 Guam "Civil Danger" Warning
