= National Periodic Test =

Annual Emergency Alert System test

A National Periodic Test (NPT), currently known as a Nationwide Test of the Emergency Alert System since 2022, is an Emergency Alert System test that is conducted nationwide every year by the United States Government and the FCC.

== History ==
National EAS Test
Audio recording of the first national EAS test on November 9, 2011, as heard on WISN-TV in Milwaukee and the cable EAS of Charter Communications' Wisconsin headend.

On February 3, 2011, the FCC announced plans and procedures for national EAS tests, which involve all television and radio stations connected to the EAS, as well as all cable and satellite services in the United States. They are not relayed on the NOAA Weather Radio (NOAA/NWS) network as it is an initiation-only network and does not receive messages from the PEP network. The national test would transmit and relay an Emergency Action Notification on November 9, 2011 at 2:00 p.m. EST.

The Federal Communications Commission found that only half of the participants received the message via Integrated Public Alert and Warning System, and some "failed to receive or retransmit alerts due to erroneous equipment configuration, equipment readiness and upkeep issues, and confusion regarding EAS rules and technical requirements", and that participation among low-power broadcasters was low. Many reported visuals or audio missing, and in the case of DirecTV, aired Lady Gaga music instead.This is due to the fact that DirecTV's channels play music when nothing is airing, and this is still the case for their EAS channel. To reduce viewer confusion, the FCC stated that future national tests would be delivered under the new event code "National Periodic Test" ("NPT"), and list "United States" as its location.

A second national test, the first classified as an NPT, occurred on September 28, 2016 as part of National Preparedness Month. A third NPT occurred on September 27, 2017.

The fourth NPT occurred on October 3, 2018 (delayed from September 20, 2018, due to Hurricane Florence). It was preceded by the first mandatory Wireless Emergency Alerts (WEA) test.

The fifth NPT occurred on August 7, 2019, and moved up from past years to prevent it from occurring during the heart of the Atlantic hurricane season. The test focused exclusively on distribution to broadcast outlets and television providers via the primary entry point network to gauge the efficiency of alert distribution in the event the internet cannot be used.

The sixth NPT was postponed to 2021 amid the ongoing COVID-19 pandemic "out of consideration for the unusual circumstances and working conditions for those in the broadcast and cable industry." The sixth test occurred on August 11, 2021, at 2:20 pm EDT. This test involved the WEA system alongside television and radio.

As of 2022, as part of a clarification and streamlining of terminology used in messages, further NPTs will now be referred to in the test message as a "Nationwide Test of the Emergency Alert System" issued by the United States Government. On May 3, 2022, it was announced that the seventh NPT would not take place during 2022, and instead occur in early 2023.

Screen seen on cable TV systems announcing a Nationwide Test of the Emergency Alert System, November 17, 2026

Seventh National EAS Test
An audio recording of the seventh National Periodic EAS test that occurred on October 4, 2023, heard on KEYC-TV in Mankato, Minnesota.

On August 3, 2023, FEMA and the FCC announced that the seventh NPT would occur October 4, 2023 with a backup date of October 11, 2023. The test commenced just before 2:20 pm ET, and consisted of an alert on TV/radio as well as a WEA on all cell phones.

A test was planned for 2024, but was ultimately cancelled by the FCC for unknown reasons. A test was also planned for fall 2025 but was also canceled, possibly due to Donald Trump's staffing cuts.

Announced on September 16, 2026, the eighth NPT occurred on November 17, 2026 with a backup date of December 3, 2026. Unlike the previous test, it did not use the WEA system and instead focused on alerts on TV and radio similar to the 2019 test.
