= Makani Pahili =

Civil exercise in Hawaii

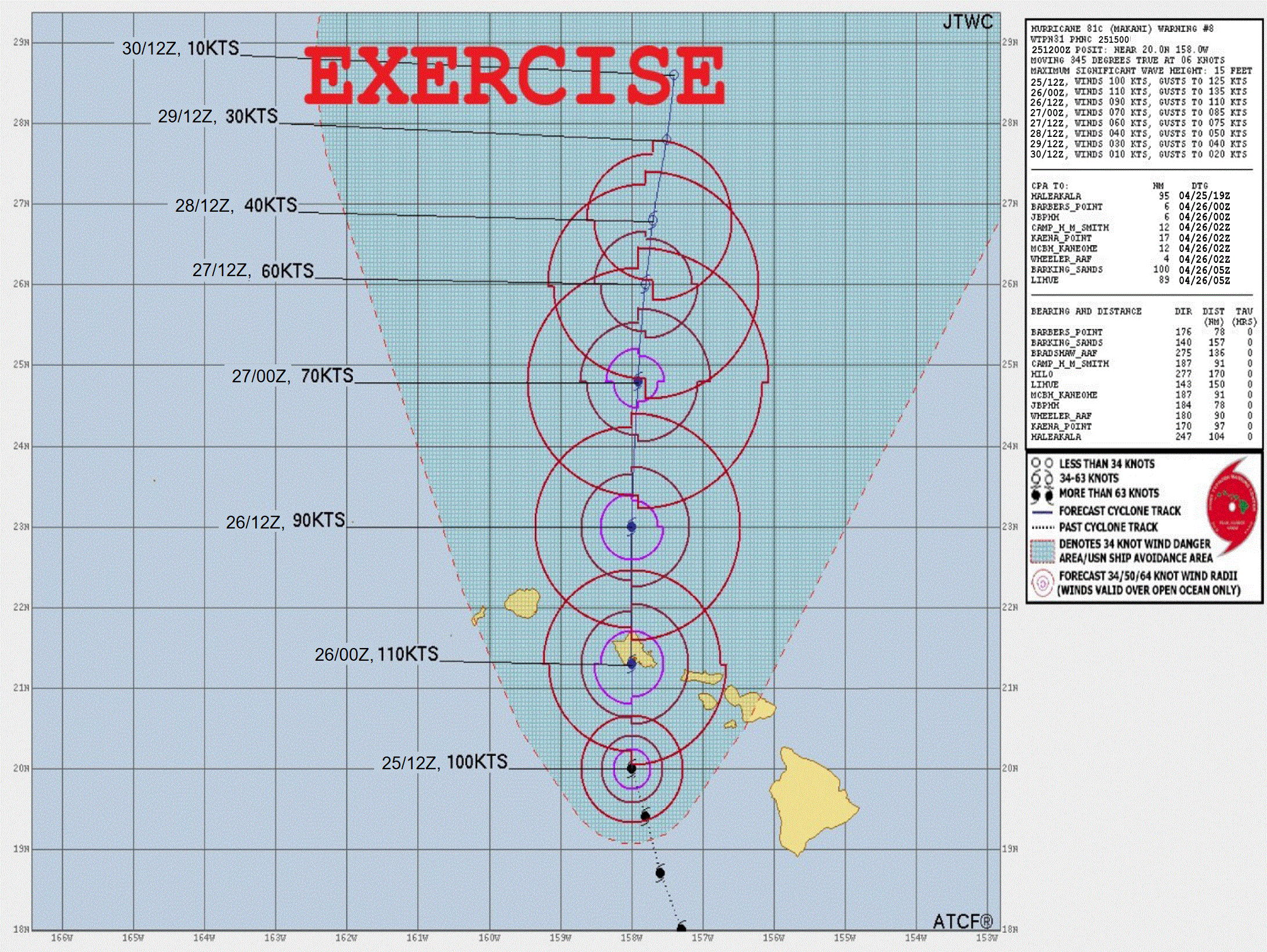
A theoretical forecast map of a hypothetical Category 4 hurricane inbound for the island of Oahu published by the Joint Typhoon Warning Center.

Makani Pahili (alternatively Makani Pāhili, Hawaiian for strong wind) is an annual disaster preparedness exercise for tropical cyclones organized between the United States Armed Forces and Hawaiian civil agencies that occurs near the beginning the local hurricane season.

== Process ==
Makani Pahili is coordinated by the Hawaii Emergency Management Agency. Drills are not intended to impact the public; though, in order to avoid confusion with any real event, all communications related to Makani Pahili are marked with the phrase "exercise, exercise, exercise". Should a real emergency take place, Makani Pahili's operations would cease.

During the exercise, a hurricane named Makani is simulated to impact the Hawaiian Islands. Mock watches and warnings are issued for the hurricane and its intensity will be tracked and plotted.

Hawaii's ports are tested for the impact of damages.

Amateur radio operators volunteer during Makani Pahili to aid in communication during a disaster. Service members from the Continental United States also participate in exercise. Hospitals have used Makani Pahili exercises to receive accreditation.

== History ==
Makani Pahili began in 1993 in response to Hurricane Iniki. The 1996 event focused on intergovernmental cooperation in the event of a disaster. In 1999, Makani Pahili began using ENGLINK, an internet based program to transfer information between departments.

== See also ==
- Tropical cyclone engineering
- Tropical cyclone warnings and watches
