= 2018 Hawaii false missile alert =

False alarm sent over all communications media in the U.S. state of Hawaii

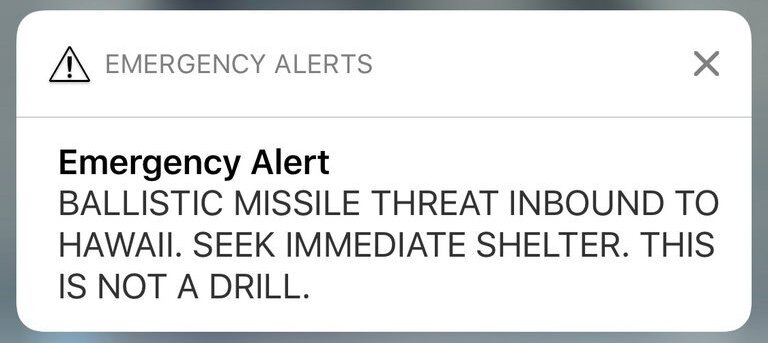
- A screenshot of the alert as displayed on an iPhone
- Date: January 13, 2018
- Time: 08:08:23 (HST)
- Duration: 38 minutes
- Location: Hawaii, United States
- Type: False alarm

At 8:08 a.m. Hawaii–Aleutian Standard Time, January 13, 2018, an alert was accidentally issued via the Emergency Alert System and Wireless Emergency Alert System over television, radio, and cellular networks in the U.S. state of Hawaii, instructing citizens to seek shelter due to an incoming ballistic missile. The state had not authorized civil defense outdoor warning sirens to sound.

Occurring during the 2017–2018 North Korea crisis, the alert was widely interpreted as a nuclear attack launched from North Korea. In a subsequent survey, 28% of respondents initially believed the alert, 45% were unsure, and 27% did not believe it. Of all respondents, 27% did not check any other sources following the alert. Some residents, not hearing sirens or seeing widespread media coverage, discounted the alert. Others found apparent confirmation in their area's activated sirens and local TV stations that had received the alert. According to the study, "the urge to call loved ones interfered with the practical need to shelter", frantic driving was common, and the "broader social contract was, in that extreme situation, at least to some degree, put into abeyance in favor of the closest social sphere".

38 minutes and 13 seconds later, state officials blamed a miscommunication during a drill at the Hawaii Emergency Management Agency for the first message. Governor David Ige apologized for the erroneous alert. The Federal Communications Commission and the Hawaii House of Representatives launched investigations into the incident, leading to the resignation of the state's emergency management administrator.

== Background ==
Estimated maximum range of some North Korean missiles

Escalating tensions between North Korea and the United States, including threats by both countries to use nuclear weapons against one another, prompted a heightened state of readiness in Hawaii. North Korea had conducted several intercontinental ballistic missile tests over the past year, most recently in November 2017, enhancing its strike capabilities. North Korea may have had the capability to deliver nuclear missiles to Hawaii at the time, and because Hawaii is located roughly 4,600 miles (7,400 km) from North Korea, a missile launch would have left approximately 12 to 15 minutes of warning time.

Hawaii officials had been working for some time to refresh the state's emergency plans in case of a nuclear attack from North Korea. An October 2017 email from the University of Hawaii to students with the subject line "In the event of a nuclear attack", containing instructions from the Hawaii Emergency Management Agency on how to react in case of a nuclear attack, caused controversy; a university spokesman ultimately apologized for "any needless concern it may have caused". Testing of the civil defense warning sirens and attack drills were also conducted in the state on the first business day of December 2017.

On December 1, 2017, a nuclear threat siren was tested in Hawaii for the first time in more than 30 years, the first of what state officials said would be monthly drills. At 11:45 a.m. on January 2, 2018, the state conducted its monthly test of the civil defense outdoor warning siren system including the sounding of a one-minute Attention Alert Signal (Steady Tone) followed by a one-minute Attack Warning Signal (Wailing Tone). There was no exercise or drill accompanying the test. Prior to January 13, 2018, 26 drills had been conducted. Vern Miyagi, the administrator of the Hawaii Emergency Management Agency, explained that state leaders "couldn't ignore these constant threats and missile tests from North Korea" and felt the need to prepare residents for the possibility of an attack. Officials also outlined what would happen if an emergency alert were sent: a push alert to smartphones and a message interrupting television and radio broadcasts.

Earlier in January 2018, U.S. Federal Communications Commission chairman Ajit Pai said the commission planned to vote to overhaul the wireless emergency alert system. The proposed reforms included providing more detailed information in alerts and confining emergency notifications to a more specific geographic area. Pai hoped that the reforms, which would take effect if approved by the FCC, would lead to greater use of the alert system in local emergency situations and prompt people to take alerts they receive more seriously.

== Incident ==
=== The alert ===
The alert was sent on the 13th of January, 2018 at 8:08 a.m. Hawaii–Aleutian Standard Time. People in Hawaii reported seeing the alert on their smartphones. Many screenshots of the push alert were shared on social media platforms, such as Twitter. The alert read, in all capital letters:

BALLISTIC MISSILE THREAT INBOUND TO HAWAII. SEEK IMMEDIATE SHELTER. THIS IS NOT A DRILL.

Local television broadcasts, including a college basketball game between Florida and Ole Miss being shown on CBS affiliate KGMB and a Premier League match between Tottenham Hotspur and Everton on NBC affiliate KHNL, were also interrupted by a similar alert message, broadcast as a Civil Danger Warning. The alert message on television broadcasts took the form of both an audio message and a scrolling banner. It stated in part:

The U.S. Pacific Command has detected a missile threat to Hawaii. A missile may impact on land or sea within minutes. THIS IS NOT A DRILL. If you are indoors, stay indoors. If you are outdoors, seek immediate shelter in a building. Remain indoors well away from windows. If you are driving, pull safely to the side of the road and seek shelter in a building or lay on the floor. We will announce when the threat has ended. THIS IS NOT A DRILL. Take immediate action measures.

The alert message also interrupted radio broadcasts in the state. In Lihue, a resident reported hearing a message on the radio advising of "an incoming missile warning for the islands of Kauai and Hawaii".

Culpability for the false alert was attributed to an employee at the Hawaii Emergency Management Agency, who officials said was a 10-year agency veteran who had previously exhibited behavior that had troubled coworkers, according to The Washington Post. Vern Miyagi, then-administrator of HI-EMA, said the alert had been inadvertently triggered by the employee as he was working at the Diamond Head Crater headquarters during a shift change. During the shift change, a supervisor ran an unscheduled drill in which he contacted emergency management workers in the guise of an officer from U.S. Pacific Command, according to state officials. The supervisor deviated from the script, officials said, erroneously stating at one point, "This is not a drill", although he reportedly did state before and after the message, "Exercise, exercise, exercise", agency code to indicate a test rather than an actual emergency.

Officials said that upon hearing the supervisor's statement, the employee, who had "confused real-life events and drills" at least twice before believed there was an actual emergency, and he later attested to this in a written statement. In an interview with NBC News, the employee shared that he was "100 percent sure that it was the right decision and that it was real". The man went on to state that he is not to blame for the incident, that overall it was a system failure, and that he did exactly what he was trained to do. He clicked the button to send out an actual notification on Hawaii's emergency alert interface during what was intended to be a test of the state's ballistic missile preparations computer program (Note: The selection for PACOM (CDW) – STATE ONLY on the Hawaii emergency alert interface screen is nearby the selections for Amber Alert (CAE) Statewide, Tsunami Warning (CEM) STATE ONLY, Landslide – Hana Road Closure, High Surf Warning North Shores, and other tests.) and then clicked through a second screen, which had been intended as a safeguard, to confirm. (Note: Hawaii is the only state in the United States with a pre-programmed Wireless Emergency Alert that can be sent quickly to wireless devices if a ballistic missile is heading toward Hawaii. If the missile is fired from North Korea, the missile would take approximately 20 minutes to reach Hawaii. PACOM would take less than 5 minutes to make a determination that the missile could impact Hawaii and would then notify the Hawaii Emergency Management Agency (HI-EMA). HI-EMA would issue the Civil Defense Warning (CDW) that an inbound missile could impact Hawaii and that people should Shelter-in-Place: Get Inside, Stay Inside, and Stay Tuned. People in Hawaii would have 12 to 15 minutes before impact. The Federal Emergency Management Agency (FEMA) is not required to be notified for approval to cancel an alert. Signal carriers allow people to block alerts from state and local law enforcement agencies, but not those issued by the President. FEMA can send alerts to targeted audiences but has not done so as of January 2018. Other states can take as long as 30 minutes to create, enter and distribute a missile alert.)

An agency spokesman told The Washington Post that the employee was prompted to choose between the options "test missile alert" and "missile alert" and had selected the latter, initiating the alert sent out across the state. The employee later claimed to the Associated Press that he had not heard the "exercise" part of the phone call because a co-worker had placed it on speakerphone partway into the message, and as a result, he had been "100 percent sure" the attack was real. State officials said five other workers were present at the agency at the time and all of them recognized the phone call as an impromptu drill. Since this incident, the employee responsible has received numerous death threats and has expressed his apologies on multiple occasions.

=== State response ===
By 8:10 a.m. HST, two minutes after the first alert, Hawaii National Guard Adjutant General Arthur "Joe" Logan had contacted U.S. Pacific Command and confirmed there had been no missile launch. At that time, the Honolulu Police Department was notified that the alert had been a false alarm. Officials used the State Warning Point system at 8:13 a.m. to cancel the alert, preventing it from being sent out to any phones that had not already received it, such as those that were switched off or did not have reception. The employee who originally sent out the erroneous notification did not respond when directed to cancel the alert, according to state officials. He later said he felt like he had been dealt a "body blow" upon realizing the supposed attack had been a drill, the Associated Press reported. Another unidentified worker grabbed the employee's computer mouse and canceled the alert when the first employee failed to respond.

Official messages refuting the emergency alert were not sent out until 8:20 a.m., according to the timeline released by officials after the incident. Hawaii Emergency Management Agency accounts on Facebook and Twitter posted messages at that time urging people to disregard the erroneous alert. Minutes later, Governor David Ige retweeted the HI-EMA message on Twitter and posted a similar message on Facebook to notify followers that the alert had been canceled. Ige later said the delay was caused in part by the fact he did not know his Twitter login information. An email from the state was also sent at about 8:25 a.m. advising that the initial alert was not correct, the Honolulu Star-Advertiser reported.

Electronic highway signs were also used to spread the word that the alert had been issued "in error" and that there was no threat to Hawaii.

==== Second alert ====
At 8:45 a.m. HST, 38 minutes after the initial alert was sent to smartphones in Hawaii, a second emergency alert (a Civil Emergency Message) was sent, which stated:

There is no missile threat or danger to the State of Hawaii. Repeat. False Alarm.

The second alert was sent "well after everyone from Hawaii's congressional delegation to the U.S. Pacific Command had assured the world on Twitter that it was a false alarm", Pacific Business News remarked.

Governor David Ige explained at a news conference that afternoon that officials "had to initiate a manual process" and obtain authorization from the Federal Emergency Management Agency in order to send the second alert because there was no automated way to countermand the first alert. Those procedures accounted for the delay more than 30 minutes after officials had confirmed internally that the alert was inaccurate, according to officials.

=== Effects ===
During the 38 minutes between the first and second alerts, Hawaii's siren warning system—which had been tested as part of a missile preparedness exercise the previous month for the first time since the Cold War—was not formally activated. Had a missile actually been launched, the Hawaii push alert should have been followed up with another set of alarms with sirens, which did not happen, as observed by some residents. Nevertheless, officials stated that some sirens did appear to go off in some communities, with some residents reporting sirens activated on Oahu a few minutes after the push notification. Little to no activity was reported at military bases in the state. Some commercial flights were reportedly delayed for a short time, although the Hawaii Department of Transportation said there were no widespread impacts at the state's airports and harbors.

Disruptions were reported across the state. Honolulu Civil Beat reported that motorists parked inside the Interstate H-3 tunnel on the island of Oahu for shelter. Hawaii News Now reported that alarms sounded at Aloha Gymfest, an international gymnastics meet in Kailua, sending hundreds of people running for cover. Students at the University of Hawaii at Manoa reportedly headed for marked fallout shelters on campus but, finding them locked, ended up taking shelter in nearby classrooms instead. Officials at the Sony Open PGA Tour golf tournament on Oahu ordered an evacuation of the media center, while staff members sought cover in the kitchen and players' locker room. Tourists at Kualoa Ranch in Kaneohe were taken by staff up to Battery Cooper Bunker, a concrete bunker built in the mountains during WW2 as part of former Kualoa Airfield, and told to shelter there.

Congresswoman Colleen Hanabusa later said her husband had been driving on a Honolulu-area freeway and saw cars speeding at up to 100 miles per hour (160 km/h) after the alert was sent out. Hanabusa, who challenged Ige in the Democratic primary in the 2018 gubernatorial election held later that year, criticized Ige's conduct, arguing "The governor and his administration did not handle this correctly".

Many Hawaii residents and visitors sought shelter or rushed through emergency preparations where they were. Some discounted the alarm when they realized that they heard no sirens, and that they personally saw no immediate coverage on television or local radio. Others were in areas where sirens did go off; in addition, some television stations did broadcast the alert.

The incident also created a strain on Hawaii's telephone system. Civil Defense offices in Hawaii were inundated with calls from frightened citizens asking for advice or more information, the New Zealand Herald reported. Many calls to 911 would not go through. Many wireless data services were likewise initially jammed, leaving many unable to access the Internet to confirm whether the alarm was real. Some residents called friends or family members to say goodbye. Others remained where they were, such as a local man playing golf, who, believing that escape was impossible, recorded a final message to his family in anticipation of the missile striking its target.

U.S. Defense Secretary James Mattis reported that the false alert did not appear to have prompted any sort of reaction from the North Korean government.

One man suffered a heart attack minutes after saying what he thought were his last goodbyes to his children following the initial alert, though he survived the heart attack.

The event was examined in an academic article by Richard Ling and Brett Oppegaard. The analysis interviewed 418 people and showed how information (and false information) can propagate quickly in society.

== Responses ==
Fear and panic quickly spread through the locals and tourists of Hawaii. Many Twitter posts and screenshots of text messages shared on social media in the immediate wake of the first alert conveyed confusion, alarm, and fear among those who received the warning. With very little warning and instructions, many people were unsure of what to do. This later became a major criticism of the Hawaii Emergency Management Agency.

=== Federal officials ===
Avatar of Tulsi Gabbard 🌺

Tulsi Gabbard 🌺
(@TulsiGabbard)
tweeted:

English:

HAWAII - THIS IS A FALSE ALARM. THERE IS NO INCOMING MISSILE TO HAWAII. I HAVE CONFIRMED WITH OFFICIALS THERE IS NO INCOMING MISSILE.

January 13, 2018

Members of Hawaii's congressional delegation also took to Twitter to dispel the false alarm. Congresswoman Tulsi Gabbard tweeted at 8:19 a.m. HST, about 12 minutes after the initial alert was sent, stating in all capitals that the message was a "false alarm" and that she had confirmed with officials that there was no incoming ballistic missile toward Hawaii. The next day, she told CNN that the incident highlighted the need for President Donald Trump to negotiate with North Korean leader Kim Jong-un to resolve nuclear tensions between the United States and North Korea, and she called for those responsible for the erroneous alert in Hawaii "to be held accountable". Congresswoman Colleen Hanabusa, a 2018 candidate for governor, tweeted that the "panic and fear created by this false alarm was very dangerous". In further comments, Hanabusa panned the delay between the two emergency alerts, suggesting it should not have taken 38 minutes for the second message to be sent. Senator Mazie Hirono tweeted that officials "need to get to the bottom of what happened and make sure it never happens again". In his own tweets immediately after the incident, Senator Brian Schatz repeated that the first alert had been a false alarm. He described the erroneous alert message as "totally inexcusable", adding: "The whole state was terrified. There needs to be tough and quick accountability and a fixed process."

Commander David Benham, a spokesman for U.S. Pacific Command, confirmed to media that there was no imminent missile threat to Hawaii. A spokesman for North American Aerospace Defense Command (NORAD) stated that "NORAD did not see anything that indicated any sort of threat to Hawaii" and said NORAD and U.S. Northern Command were still verifying what had happened. President Trump had also been under fire by critics for his "lack of response" some said. A White House official said the alert had been part of "a state exercise" and President Trump was briefed on the situation. Trump ordered National Security Advisor H.R. McMaster to take charge of the administration's response to the incident. About the incident, Trump said, "They made a mistake."

U.S. Homeland Security Secretary Kirstjen Nielsen said the incident was "unfortunate" and officials were working to prevent a similar false alert from being issued in the future. Speaking on Fox News the next day, she said people "can trust government systems" and should pay attention to any alerts they receive from authorities in the future, in spite of the January 13 incident in Hawaii.

Ajit Pai, chairman of the U.S. Federal Communications Commission, announced the commission would launch a full investigation into the false alert. He blamed Hawaii's government for not having "reasonable safeguards or process controls in place to prevent the transmission of a false alert", later stating that other agencies should "learn from these mistakes".

Congresswoman Tulsi Gabbard stated in an interview after the second emergency alert was sent that the incident was "a taste of the stark reality of what we face here of a potential nuclear strike on Hawaii", referring to the possibility of a North Korean attack. She and former Secretary of Defense William J. Perry both said the false alert highlighted the possibility of an "accidental nuclear war", in which a technical or human error leads to the use of nuclear weapons due to a misunderstanding or misinterpretation.

=== State officials ===
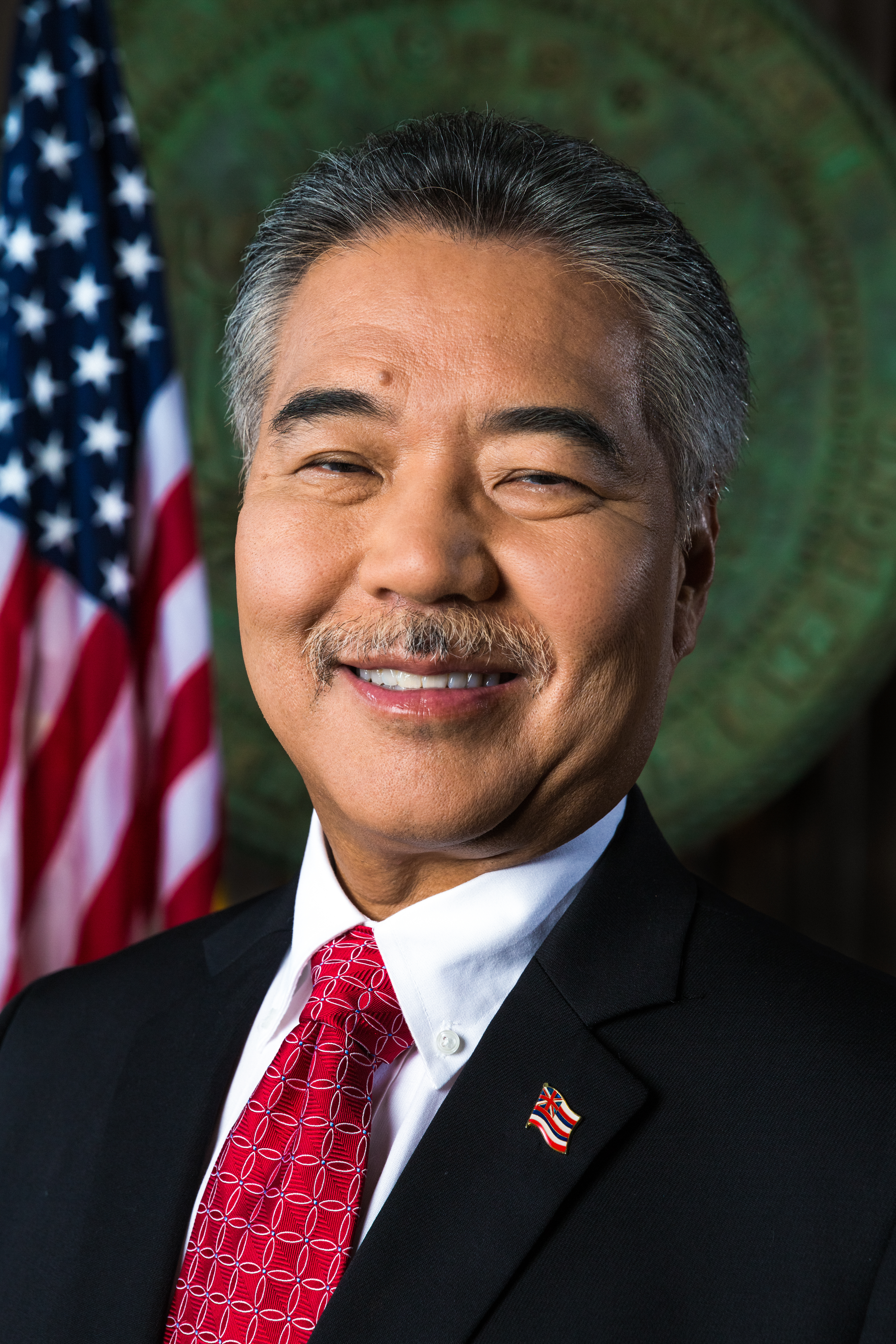
David Ige, who served as Governor of Hawaii at the time of the incident

Honolulu Mayor Kirk Caldwell also tweeted that the message had been a false alarm, saying the message had been sent in error before the second alert was sent out by the Hawaii Emergency Management Agency.

HI-EMA administrator Vern Miyagi took responsibility for the incident, ultimately resigning over it. Miyagi described the initial warning as a "mistake", saying it "should have been caught" before the alert was sent out. HI-EMA officials, including Miyagi, said there was no evidence that the agency's systems had been hacked to send the false emergency message.

Miyagi apologized for the false alert, as did Governor David Ige, who called the incident "unfortunate and regrettable". They said officials would review the state's procedures to prevent it from happening again. Ige said:

I know first-hand how today's false alarm affected all of us here in Hawaii, and I am sorry for the pain and confusion it caused. I, too, am extremely upset about this and am doing everything I can do to immediately improve our emergency management systems, procedures and staffing.

Hawaii Senate Majority Leader J. Kalani English said he was "outraged" by the error, which caused unnecessary "panic and pandemonium" throughout the state. Hawaii House of Representatives Speaker Scott K. Saiki announced the House would investigate the incident:

This system we have been told to rely upon failed and failed miserably today. I am deeply troubled by this misstep that could have had dire consequences. Measures must be taken to avoid further incidents that caused wholesale alarm and chaos today. Clearly, government agencies are not prepared and lack the capacity to deal with emergency situations. Apparently, the wrong button was pushed and it took over 30 minutes for a correction to be announced. Parents and children panicked during those 30 minutes. The Hawaii House of Representatives will immediately investigate what happened and there be consequences. This cannot happen again.

The deputy adjutant of the Hawaii National Guard said that notwithstanding the erroneous alert, people should continue to follow instructions and take shelter if another alert is sent in the future.

== Aftermath ==
=== Investigations ===
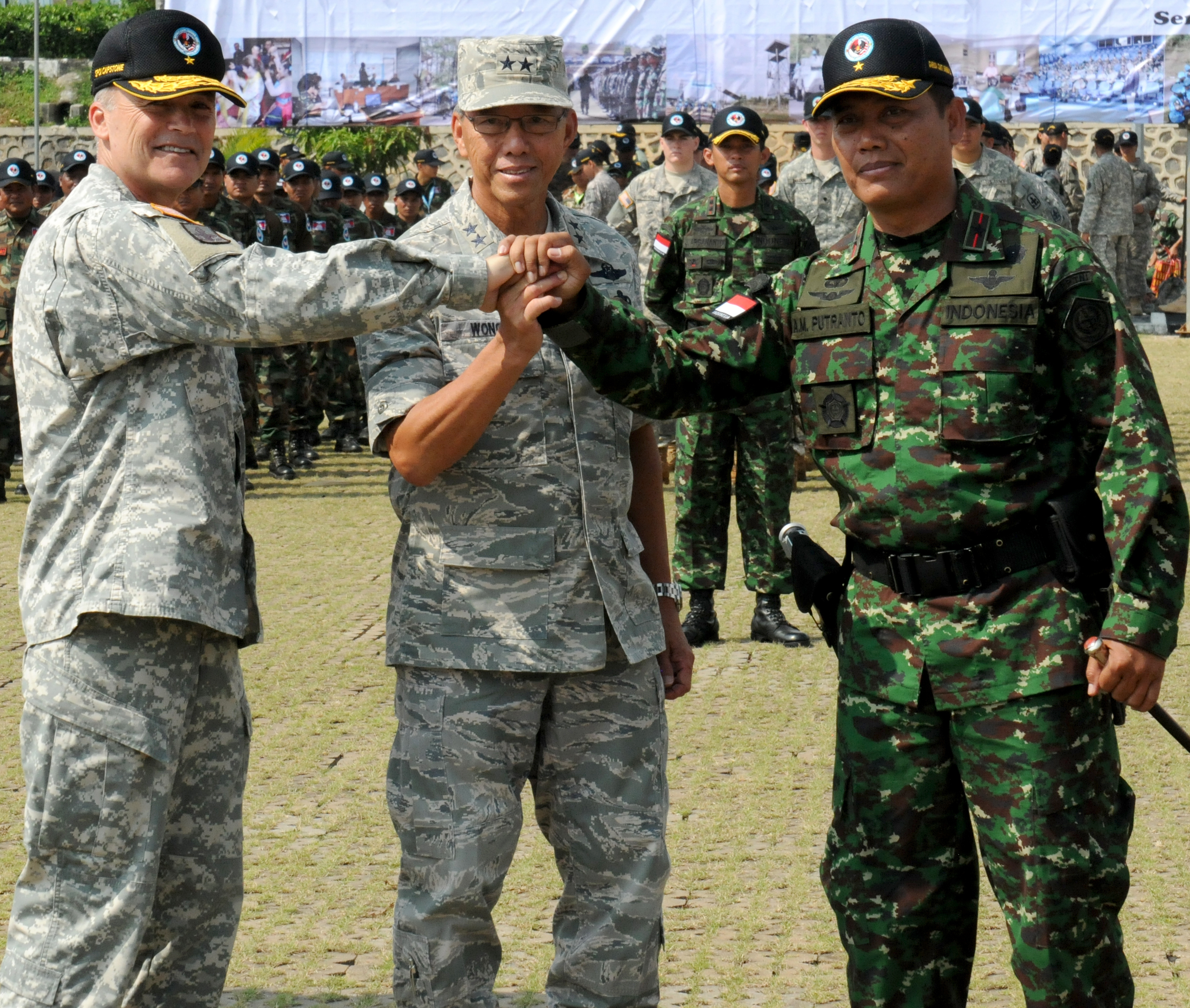
Former U.S. Army Brig. Gen. Bruce E. Oliveira (left) was tasked by the State of Hawaii to lead an internal investigation into the incident.

State officials held a news conference in the afternoon of January 13 to address the incident. State officials placed former Hawaii Army National Guard commander Bruce E. Oliveira in charge of internally investigating the events that resulted in the false alert being sent out. In his report, published January 30, Oliveira faulted "insufficient management controls, poor computer software design, and human factors" for the incident.

Officials did not name the employee responsible for the error. Hawaii Emergency Management Agency head Vern Miyagi initially declined to say whether the employee, who he said felt "terrible" about the false alert, would face discipline. An agency spokesman said January 14 the employee had been "temporarily reassigned" to a position that did not allow him access to the emergency warning system, pending the result of the internal investigation. The employee was ultimately fired on January 26, following findings in Oliveira's investigation regarding his work history, with NBC News reporting that the employee had "a history of confusing drill and real-world events". A second employee, who was also not identified and whose role in the incident was not disclosed, was suspended without pay. Toby Clairmont, HI-EMA's executive officer, announced January 20 he planned to retire by the end of the year.

The Federal Communications Commission also announced that it would conduct a full investigation into the incident. On January 25, an FCC official announced that the former employee responsible for sending the false report was refusing to cooperate with the FCC probe of the incident. The FCC report, released January 30, faulted the state for failing to quickly notify the public and not having safeguards in place sufficient to prevent the error. FCC Chairman Ajit Pai stated:

Every state and local government that originates alerts needs to learn from these mistakes. Each should make sure they have adequate safeguards in place. ... The public needs to be able to trust that when the government issues an alert it is indeed a credible alert.

Miyagi resigned as HI-EMA administrator the same day the state and federal reports were released. Clairmont announced his resignation a day later.

=== Other official actions ===
Then-administrator Vern Miyagi said the Hawaii Emergency Management Agency suspended tests while assessing what had happened following the incident. He also announced the agency immediately changed its procedures to require two people, instead of just one, to send out both test alerts and actual alerts. HI-EMA employees will be "counseled and drilled so this never happens again", Miyagi said January 14.

Governor David Ige announced January 15 that he was appointing Brigadier General Kenneth Hara, Hawaii's deputy adjutant general, to oversee a review of the state's emergency management systems and procedures and implement reforms. The agency also moved quickly to implement a cancellation command that officials said can be triggered within seconds of an erroneous alert being sent out, which it reportedly lacked before the January 13 incident. The Hawaii emergency alert interface screen was updated with a BMD False Alarm selection the same day, addressing a system deficiency that made it difficult for the state to countermand an alert sent in error.

HI-EMA reported that some of its employees received death threats after the false alert incident. In a rare public address, Ige called the threats "completely unacceptable" and said he was "ultimately responsible" for the error.

Although Governor Ige's office issued on February 27, 2018, a Siren and Emergency Alert System Test for March 1, 2018, the state of Hawaii did not test the nuclear warning siren in March and dropped its monthly test of the nuclear warning siren beginning on March 1, 2018.

In July 2018, the FCC issued a report and order which makes changes to EAS regulations to "improve the integrity, efficacy, and reliability" of the system and "minimize the potential for false alerts". The changes require EAS participants to configure their hardware to "reject Common Alerting Protocol-based alerts that contain an invalid digital signature and legacy (over-the-air)-based alerts whose expiration time falls outside of specific time limits", and report any false alarms to the FCC. The commission also implemented procedures for authorizing voluntary participation in "live code" tests—public exercises that simulate an actual emergency in order to "promote greater proficiency" in the system by EAS operators and participants. These changes were the result of recommendations from the FCC's report on the Hawaii incident.

=== Outside Hawaii ===
North Korea's Rodong Sinmun, the Workers' Party of Korea newspaper, described the false alarm as a "tragicomedy".

An official with the Division of Homeland Security & Emergency Management in the U.S. state of Alaska, also within the theoretical range of North Korean nuclear missiles, said his department encourages Alaskans to shelter in place rather than trying to get elsewhere if there is an attack, as many people in Hawaii did after the false alert was issued.

U.S. Senator Brian Schatz, one of Hawaii's two members of the United States Senate, introduced federal legislation that would prohibit state and local agencies from notifying the public of a missile launch, placing the responsibility on federal authorities to make that determination. In July 2018, Schatz also introduced the Reliable Emergency Alert Distribution Improvement (READI) Act, which proposed that a reporting system be established for false alarms, that FEMA establish best practices on use of emergency alerts and preventing dissemination of false alarms, and that State Emergency Communications Committees (SECCs) be required to update their procedures on a periodic basis. The act also proposed user-visible changes to EAS behavior, including requiring that users be prevented from opting out of wireless alerts originating from FEMA, mandating repetition of EAS broadcasts for active FEMA or presidential alerts, and compelling the FCC to investigate the feasibility of delivering emergency alerts via over-the-top streaming media services. The bill passed in the Senate but failed in the House of Representatives.

=== Similar incidents ===
- On January 16, only a few days after Hawaii's false alarm, Japan had a similar alarm sent out. An NHK news staffer sent an erroneous alert about a North Korean missile fired at Japan to 300,000 followers of its "NHK News and Disaster Prevention" service. Previously, NHK and other Japanese media sent alerts for each North Korean missile test, but this alert stated "It appears that North Korea has launched a missile". Overall, the public reaction was not as extreme as what was witnessed in Hawaii as the NHK within 5 minutes of the alert posted on their website stating that it was a false alarm.
- On September 18, 2019, emergency sirens were accidentally set off on the island of Oahu during police training, causing confusion and fear among residents. Again, HI-EMA was required to issue a retraction on Twitter.
- On January 12, 2020, nearly two years to the date of the Hawaii false alarm, the emergency operations center for the Canadian province of Ontario mistakenly issued an emergency alert on its Alert Ready system for all television stations and television providers, radio stations, and wireless networks in the province, containing an advisory relating to an alleged incident being addressed at the Pickering Nuclear Generating Station. The alert was confirmed to be a false alarm. In a nearly-identical manner to the Hawaii incident, the false alarm was the result of an operator error by a provincial emergency operations officer during a routine internal test at the beginning of a shift; the officer accidentally forgot to log out of the live Alert Ready system (done to check if the system is operational) before running the test (meant to be sent on a second, internal system), while there was also a breakdown in communications with supervisors over the issuance of a second alert to retract it.

=== In popular culture ===
- The events of the Hawaii false missile incident served as the basis for writer Dan Scott's radio play Emergency Alert: Ballistic Missile Inbound which was broadcast on BBC Radio 4 on 20th March 2024. The play took key events from the incident and transported them from Hawaii to an English village in 2024.
- An off-Broadway musical about the incident titled This Is Not a Drill premiered at the Theater at St. Jean's on September 9th, 2025. Its creator, Holly Doubet, was on vacation in Hawaii during the 2018 event, and the musical is based on her experience.
- The Rookie season 2 episode 6, titled "Fallout", which aired in 2019, depicts a similar event, with the citizens of Los Angeles receiving a false alarm ballistic missile attack alert via mobile Emergency Alert System. The 2018 Hawaii incident is referenced in the episode.
- The King Blues - 38 Minutes (Album) is a 12 Track Album by Jonny "Itch" Fox covering the events from the perspective of Hawaiian locals.

== See also ==
- 1983 Soviet nuclear false alarm incident – Incident which nearly precipitated nuclear warfare
- 2005 Connecticut false evacuation alert – False evacuation alert for Connecticut, United States
- 2017 Guam "Civil Danger" Warning – False civil danger warning for Guam
- 2026 Brazilian civil defense system false alarm – Cyberattack in the Brazilian civil defense system
- Able Archer 83 – NATO command post exercise in 1983
- Civil danger warning – Type of emergency alert issued in the United States
- Civil defense – Protection of citizens from disasters and military attack
- Emergency Alert System – Method of emergency broadcasting in the United States
- Emergency population warning – Warning issued by authorities to the public en masse
- List of nuclear close calls – List of incidents which could have led to a nuclear exchange
- United States Indo-Pacific Command – US joint military command
