= KTWG =

Radio station in Hagåtña, Guam

Coordinates: 13°27′07″N 144°42′32″E

Hagåtña, Guam; Guam
- Broadcast area: Guam and the Northern Mariana Islands
- Frequency: 801 kHz

Programming
- Format: Christian radio
- Affiliations: Trans World Radio

Ownership
- Owner: Edward H. Poppe, Jr. and Frances W. Poppe

History
- First air date: November 1, 1974; 51 years ago
- Call sign meaning: Knowing The Word of God

Technical information
- Facility ID: 67503
- Class: B
- Power: 10,000 watts
- Translator: (105.9 MHz) K290CR (Hagåtña)

Links
- Website: http://www.ktwg.com/

KTWG (801 AM) is a non-commercial radio station broadcasting a Christian radio format. Licensed to Hagåtña, Guam, United States, it serves Guam and Northern Marianas Islands. The station is owned by Edward H. Poppe, Jr. and Frances W. Poppe, and is managed by Leilani Dahilig. The station's studios are located in Piti. Most programming is supplied by Trans World Radio (TWR).

While the station broadcasts at 801 kHz, many American radios, especially the digital readout variety, are capable of tuning in AM stations in 10 kHz increments only. Therefore, in the station's marketing, the nearest frequency, "800", is used instead. Stations in Guam fall within the jurisdiction of the Geneva Frequency Plan of 1975, instead of the North American Regional Broadcasting Agreement, whose coverage includes the U.S. mainland and Hawaii.

KTWG is the primary entry point for the Emergency Alert System in Guam and the Northern Mariana Islands.

== History ==
KTWG went on air November 1, 1974. It was owned by Trans World Radio Pacific and initially operated on 770 kHz. A move to 800/801 was approved in 1978. It is licensed to 801 kHz as Class B Station with 10 kW since October 22, 1982.
