= KSTO =

Radio station in Hagåtña, Guam

Hagåtña; Guam
- Broadcast area: Guam
- Frequency: 95.5 MHz
- Branding: K-Stereo 95.5

Programming
- Format: Adult Contemporary

Ownership
- Owner: Inter-Island Communications
- Sister stations: KISH

History
- First air date: August 15, 1973
- Call sign meaning: "Stereo"

Technical information
- Licensing authority: FCC
- Facility ID: 28863
- Class: C2
- ERP: 25,000 watts
- HAAT: 177.6 meters
- Transmitter coordinates: 13°29′21″N 144°50′02″E

Links
- Public license information: Public file; LMS

KSTO (95.5 FM), branded as K-Stereo 95.5, is an adult contemporary radio station serving the island of Guam, licensed to Hagåtña. KSTO is owned by Inter-Island Communications.

== History ==
=== Turbulent early years ===
KSTO began operations on August 15, 1973. The original owner of KSTO was the Marianas Broadcasting Corporation. "Stereo 95" was a full-service radio station, promoting a music mix "where McCartney meets Mantovani", and just the second FM station for the island. After a Federal Communications Commission inspection found that the station was missing meters on the transmitter control panel—a technical violation—the station briefly went silent on February 6, 1974, to rectify the problem.

The station's four-week silence ended on March 4, but just days later, KSTO went silent—this time for 15 months—in a financial cloud. Steve Spears, the principal of Marianas, left the island on March 9. His wife, Sandy, told the station's employees that she was driving him to the airport—she did, and she left Guam as well along with their two children. Back on Guam, station employees and others were left to contend with the $60,000 in debt he left behind. Most of that debt was to the First National City Bank, which lent Spears $25,000; in February, a judge issued a restraining order against Marianas to ensure that First National City's loan was repaid. The station was also in debt to Guam Publications, the owner of the Pacific Daily News, and the Guam Power Authority, as well as the telephone company, accounting and law firms, and its 15 former employees. An anonymous former employee of KSTO told the Daily News that the financial situation of the venture was a "successfully screwed up mess". With the radio station off the air, vandals stole most of its equipment from the building in Barrigada.

A receiver, Claude F. Shouse, was appointed for the station and tried to get it back in working order, though he still had to chase down stolen equipment and creditors; however, Shouse did not put the station back on air immediately, as he sought to relocate it to a new site above Barrigada Heights, and he could not obtain a business license for the residential area where the station had been built.

=== Return to air ===
Inter-Island Communications, Inc., bought the station at auction for $39,000 in January 1975. The president of Inter-Island was 32-year-old Edward H. Poppe, an employee of NASA. The station was able to return to air on June 20. The new K-Stereo operated as the only 24-hour radio station on Guam. However, bad luck struck again when Typhoon Pamela came through Guam in May 1976 and destroyed the Barrigada site; with no insurance on the facility, it was declared a total loss. Yet again, thieves took equipment, some of which was later recovered at a local junkyard. The station was able to return to the air, with a patched-up transmitter and new studios, on December 14.

KSTO remained a wide-ranging popular music outlet, with hourly local and ABC news features. The station shifted toward an adult contemporary format, which it retains today, in the mid-1980s.

From May 25 to August 7, 2023, KSTO's format was broadcast by co-owned KISH (102.9 FM), after Typhoon Mawar caused major damage to the KSTO antenna site.
