= Hawaii Emergency Management Agency =

Body responsible for managing emergencies in the United States State of Hawaii

- HI-EMA

Agency overview
- Type: Emergency management
- Jurisdiction: Hawaii
- Employees: Approximately 70
- Agency executives: Major General Stephen Logan, Director; James Barros, Administrator

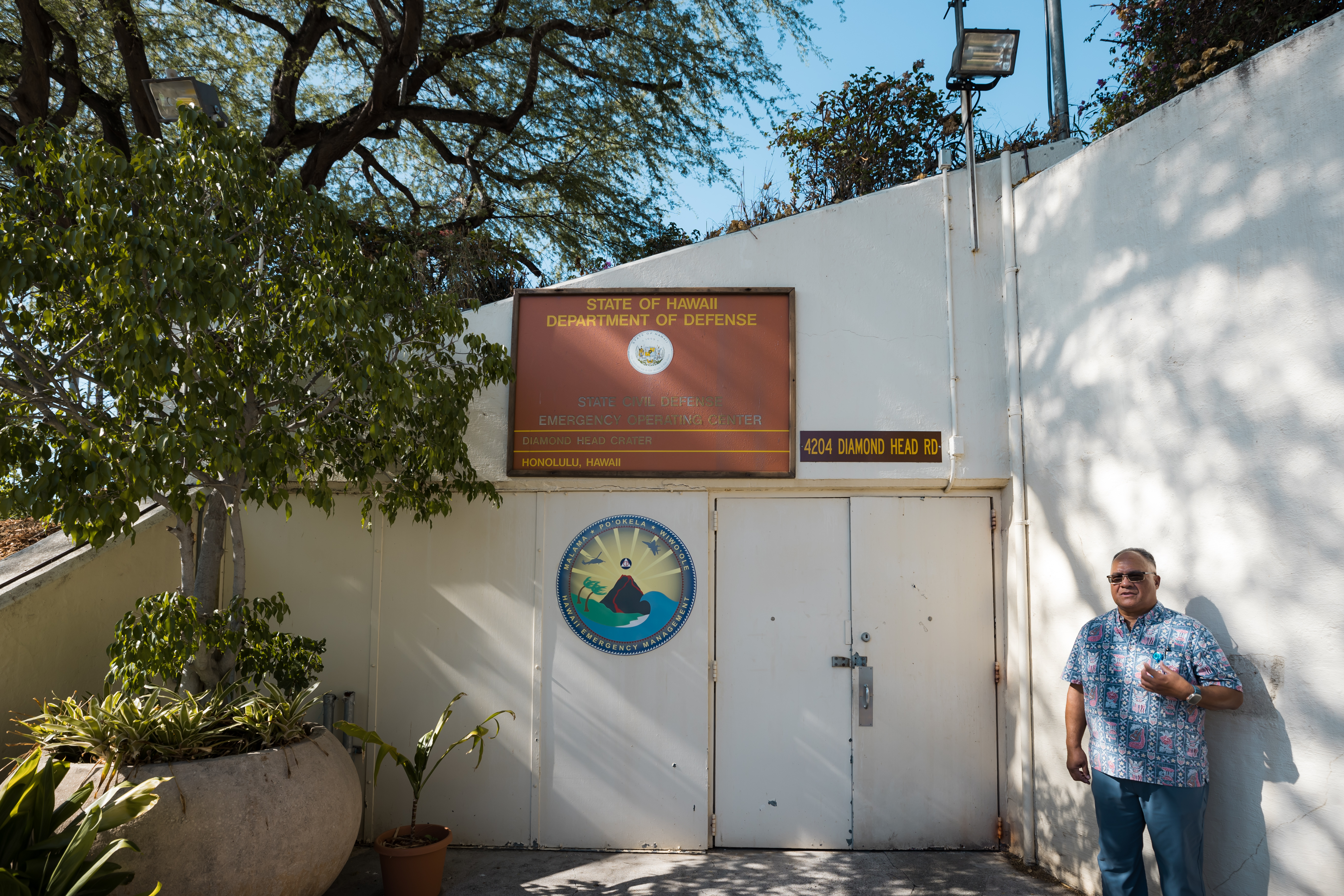
Hawaii Emergency Management Agency exterior

The Hawaii Emergency Management Agency (HI-EMA) is the body responsible for managing emergencies in the United States State of Hawaii.

The director is Major General Stephen Logan and the administrator is James Barros.

The agency employs roughly 70 personnel focused on emergency management duties. HI-EMA manages a full lifecycle of disasters - Mitigation, Preparedness, Response, and recovery. Most disasters, and all major disasters involve these phases. Prior to hurricane season, the agency organizes Makani Pahili, an annual preparedness exercise.

On January 13, 2018, the Agency received worldwide attention when one of its employees accidentally broadcast a ballistic missile alert to all the citizens of Hawaii, which, at the height of American nuclear tensions with North Korea, caused a statewide panic.

In August 2023, the Agency was criticized for not sounding the sirens for the 2023 Hawaii wildfires on Maui.
