= List of weather services =

This is a list of notable weather services.

Criteria for inclusion:

- weather service is notable enough to have its own article on Wikipedia
- notability is established by reliable sources

== Radio, TV and online services ==
Name	Location	Coverage	Type
NBC Weather Plus	United States	Global	TV
The Weather Channel	United States	Global	TV
Weather Underground	United States	Global	Web
The Weather Network	Canada	National	TV
MétéoMédia	Canada	National	TV
AccuWeather	United States	National	WEB
The Local AccuWeather Channel	United States	National	TV
NOAA Weather Radio	United States	National	Radio
Weatheradio Canada	Canada	National	Radio
Bermuda Radio	Bermuda	Regional	Radio
National Severe Weather Warning Service	UK	National	TV, Radio, Web
Servizio Meteorologico	Italy	National	TV, Radio; Web
WTV Weather TV	Greece	National	TV
ITV Weather	UK	National	TV
MetVUW	New Zealand	National	Web
Weather Channel (New Zealand)	New Zealand	National	TV
BBC Weather	UK	National	TV, Web
News 12 Traffic & Weather	United States	Regional	TV
Sirius XM Weather & Emergency	United States	Regional	Radio
The Weather Channel (Australia)	Australia	National	TV, Web
Continuous marine broadcast	Canada	National	Radio
Meteocentre		International	Web
Royal Netherlands Meteorological Institute	Netherlands	National	TV, Radio, Web
Royal Meteorological Institute	Belgium	National	TV, Radio, Web
Met Éireann	Ireland	National	TV, Radio, Web
Estonian Weather Service	Estonia	National	Web
Japan Weather Association	Japan	National	Web
WEATHERNEWS INC.	Japan	National	Web
Weather Map Co., Ltd.	Japan	National	Web
