= National Weather Service Minneapolis/Twin Cities, Minnesota =

Weather forecast office of the National Weather Service

National Weather Service Minneapolis/Twin Cities is a weather forecast office responsible for monitoring weather conditions for 51 counties in the states of Minnesota & Wisconsin. The office is in charge of weather forecasts, warnings and local statements as well as aviation weather. It is also equipped with a WSR-88D (NEXRAD) radar, and an Automated Surface Observing System (ASOS) that greatly increase the ability to forecast.

== NOAA Weather Radio ==

National Weather Service Twin Cities Forecast Office in Chanhassen, Minnesota provides programming for 13 NOAA Weather Radio stations across Central and Southern Minnesota and West Central Wisconsin.

=== KEC65 Twin Cities ===
KEC65
- St. Paul, Minnesota
- Frequency: 162.550 MHz

Programming
- Language: English
- Format: Weather/Civil Emergency

Technical information
- Power: 1000 Watts

Links
- Webcast: Listen Live
- Website: KEC65

KEC65 broadcasts weather and hazard information for Anoka, Carver, Chisago, Dakota, Goodhue, Hennepin, Ramsey, Rice, Scott, Washington & Wright counties in Minnesota. And Pierce, Polk & St. Croix counties in Wisconsin.

=== WNG685 Norwood Young America ===
WNG685
- Norwood Young America, Minnesota
- Frequency: 162.425 MHz

Programming
- Language: English
- Format: Weather/Civil Emergency

Technical information
- Power: 300 Watts

Links
- Website: WNG685

WNG685 broadcasts weather and hazard information for Carver, Hennepin, Le Sueur, McLeod, Meeker, Nicollet, Renville, Scott, Sibley & Wright counties in Minnesota.

=== WNG676 Clearwater ===
WNG676
- Clearwater, Minnesota
- Frequency: 162.500 MHz

Programming
- Language: English
- Format: Weather/Civil Emergency

Technical information
- Power: 1000 Watts

Links
- Webcast: Listen Live
- Website: WNG676

WNG676 broadcasts weather and hazard information for Anoka, Benton, Carver, Hennepin, Isanti, McLeod, Meeker, Mille Lacs, Sherburne, Stearns & Wright counties in Minnesota.

=== WXL65 St. Cloud ===
WXL65
- St. Cloud, Minnesota
- Frequency: 162.400 MHz

Programming
- Language: English
- Format: Weather/Civil Emergency

Technical information
- Power: 300 Watts

Links
- Website: WXL65

WXL65 broadcasts weather and hazard information for Benton, Mille Lacs, Morrison, Sherburne & Stearns counties in Minnesota.

=== KJY80 Red Wing ===
KJY80
- Red Wing, Minnesota
- Frequency: 162.450 MHz

Programming
- Language: English
- Format: Weather/Civil Emergency

Technical information
- Power: 300 Watts

Links
- Website: KJY80

KJY80 broadcasts weather and hazard information for Dakota, Goodhue and Wabasha counties in Minnesota, and Buffalo, Pepin, Pierce and St. Croix counties in Wisconsin.

=== WXK44 Willmar ===
WXK44
- New London, Minnesota
- Frequency: 162.475 MHz

Programming
- Language: English
- Format: Weather/Civil Emergency

Technical information
- Power: 1000 Watts

Links
- Website: WXK44

WXK44 broadcasts weather and hazard information for Benton, Chippewa, Kandiyohi, Lac qui Parle, McLeod, Meeker, Pope, Renville, Stearns, Stevens, Swift, Wright & Yellow Medicine counties in Minnesota.

=== WNG711 Olivia ===
WNG711
- Olivia, Minnesota
- Frequency: 162.400 MHz

Programming
- Language: English
- Format: Weather/Civil Emergency

Technical information
- Power: 300 Watts

Links
- Website: WNG711

WNG711 broadcasts weather and hazard information for Brown, Chippewa, Kandiyohi, Redwood, Renville & Yellow Medicine counties in Minnesota.

=== KXI39 New Ulm ===
KXI39
- New Ulm, Minnesota
- Frequency: 162.525 MHz

Programming
- Language: English
- Format: Weather/Civil Emergency

Technical information
- Power: 1000 Watts

Links
- Website: KXI39

KXI39 broadcasts weather and hazard information for Blue Earth, Brown, Cottonwood, Faribault, Jackson, Martin, McLeod, Nicollet, Redwood, Renville, Sibley & Watonwan counties in Minnesota.

=== WXK40 Mankato ===
WXK40
- Janesville, Minnesota
- Frequency: 162.400 MHz

Programming
- Language: English
- Format: Weather/Civil Emergency

Technical information
- Power: 1000 Watts

Links
- Website: WXK40

WXK40 broadcasts weather and hazard information for Blue Earth, Brown, Dodge, Faribault, Freeborn, Le Sueur, Martin, Mower, Nicollet, Rice, Steele, Waseca & Watonwan counties in Minnesota.

=== WNG673 Long Prairie ===
WNG673
- Long Prairie, Minnesota
- Frequency: 162.525 MHz

Programming
- Language: English
- Format: Weather/Civil Emergency

Technical information
- Power: 1000 Watts

Links
- Website: WNG673

WNG673 broadcasts weather and hazard information for Cass, Crow Wing, Douglas, Morrison, Otter Tail, Pope, Stearns, Todd & Wadena counties in Minnesota.

=== WNG707 Kensington ===
WNG707
- Hoffman, Minnesota
- Frequency: 162.400 MHz

Programming
- Language: English
- Format: Weather/Civil Emergency

Technical information
- Power: 1000 Watts

Links
- Website: WNG707

WNG707 broadcasts weather and hazard information for Big Stone, Douglas, Grant, Pope, Stevens & Traverse counties in Minnesota.

=== WNG577 Ladysmith ===
WNG577
- Ladysmith, Wisconsin
- Frequency: 162.550 MHz

Programming
- Language: English
- Format: Weather/Civil Emergency

Technical information
- Power: 1000 Watts

Links
- Website: WNG577

WNG577 broadcasts weather and hazard information for Barron, Chippewa, Price, Rusk, Sawyer, Taylor & Washburn counties in Wisconsin.

=== WXJ88 Menomonie ===
WXJ88
- Wheeler, Wisconsin
- Frequency: 162.400 MHz

Programming
- Language: English
- Format: Weather/Civil Emergency

Technical information
- Power: 1000 Watts

Links
- Webcast: Listen Live
- Website: WXJ88

WXJ88 broadcasts weather and hazard information for Barron, Buffalo, Chippewa, Dunn, Eau Claire, Pepin, Pierce, Polk Rusk, St. Croix & Trempeleau counties in Wisconsin.
