= ZBR =

ZBR may refer to:

- Callsign for Bermuda Radio, a radio station in Bermuda
- IATA code for Konarak Airport, Chabahar, Iran
- Postal code for Żabbar, Malta
- Zone bit recording
