= ArabiaWeather =

Private weather company in Jordan

- Native name: طقس العرب
- Type: Private
- Founded: 2006
- Founder: Mohammed Al-Shaker
- Headquarters: Amman, Jordan
- Number of employees: 30+
- Website: ArabiaWeather.com

ArabiaWeather Inc. (Arabic: طقس العرب) is a private weather company providing weather services to consumers and businesses in the Arab world. The company is headquartered in Amman, Jordan, and has offices in Dubai, UAE.

The company was founded in 2006 by Jordanian entrepreneur Mohammed Al-Shaker. In 2012, Al-Shaker was named Ernst & Young Emerging Entrepreneur of the Year in Jordan.

ArabiaWeather has a team of over 30 meteorologists, researchers, developers, and designers, including dedicated experts from Jordan, UAE, Kuwait, Syria, and others. The company serves consumers in the region through its web and mobile properties. According to Alexa, ArabiaWeather's website, ArabiaWeather.com, is one of the top 100 most-trafficked websites in Saudi Arabia and Jordan. The company also has iOS and Android applications.

ArabiaWeather serves enterprises in the region with weather data and weather services, serving sectors including media, aviation, agriculture, transportation, construction, energy, and others.

== Company profile ==
ArabiaWeather was preceded by Jordanweather.jo, which was launched in 2006 to report local weather news in Jordan. Its founder, Mohammed Al-Shaker, gained popularity as a go-to source for weather information in Jordan, frequently appearing on radio shows and TV stations. In 2010, Jordanweather was re-launched as ArabiaWeather.com, a website that supplies weather information across the region.

ArabiaWeather collects data from local weather stations and has a direct connection with a weather satellite covering the Arab world. The team then models the spread of weather with their own algorithms, to generate presentable forecasts according to topography and climate.

ArabiaWeather became the primary weather source for numerous TV stations, Radio stations, Newspapers and Online sites such as Ro’ya TV, Mazaj FM Radio station, Al-ghad newspaper and STC website.

The company splits its business model between Business to Business (B2B) and Business to Consumer (B2C). Under B2B, ArabiaWeather provides services and reports to the aviation industry, TV stations, media outlets, and airports, as well as the agricultural sector and oil and gas companies in Saudi Arabia.

As for the B2C, which is strictly limited to the website, social media channels, and the mobile app, the company generates money directly via advertising. Although al-Shaker dubs advertising low in fruit, figures reveal that it is actually mushrooming.

ArabiaWeather Inc. a company generates its own hyper-local weather data based on unique algorithms and processes done "in-house" using advanced super computers and provides accurate, up-to-date, localized information pertaining to weather in the Arab World, covering over 5,000 locations and serving 12 business industries across the MENA region.

In addition to weather forecasting services ArabiaWeather produces nature and science-related news.

== Products and services ==
1. Weather forecasts and news, hour-by-hour outlook, 14 days weather forecast, blogs.
2. Weather feature that relates individual’s life activities and weather conditions including health status, weather and travel, weather and events, outdoor activities, sports activities.
3. Web-TV Weather Channel.
4. Mobile Application.
5. Live Satellite.
6. 3D Map.

== See also ==
- AccuWeather
- Wunderground.com - A personal weather stations based network that competes against commercial forecasting firms
