= Weatheradio Canada =

Former weather radio service in Canada

- Frequency: 162.400–162.550 MHz

Programming
- Format: Weather radio

Ownership
- Owner: Environment and Climate Change Canada
- Operator: Meteorological Service of Canada

History
- First air date: 1976
- Last air date: March 16, 2026

Links
- Website: Weatheradio Canada

Weatheradio Canada English broadcast cycle in Edmonton; station XLM572.

Weatheradio Canada (French: Radiométéo Canada) was an automated 24-hour network of VHF FM weather radio stations based in Canada. Owned and operated by Environment and Climate Change Canada's Meteorological Service of Canada division, it was one of the two weather radio systems across North America alongside NOAA Weather Radio in the United States. Weatheradio Canada was headquartered in Montreal, Quebec, and was broadcast in both official languages (English and French) from 230 sites across the country. Weatheradio Canada, as well as Environment Canada's weather telephone service Hello Weather, used Nuance Communications text-to-speech voices. Starcaster Text-To-Speech, owned by STR-SpeechTech Ltd, was used from 1994 to 2022.

In February 2026, Environment Canada announced the decommissioning of the service effective on March 16th of that year. All transmitters were shut down during the early morning hours of March 31, 2026.

Weatheradio Canada French broadcast cycle in Edmonton; station XLM572.

== History ==
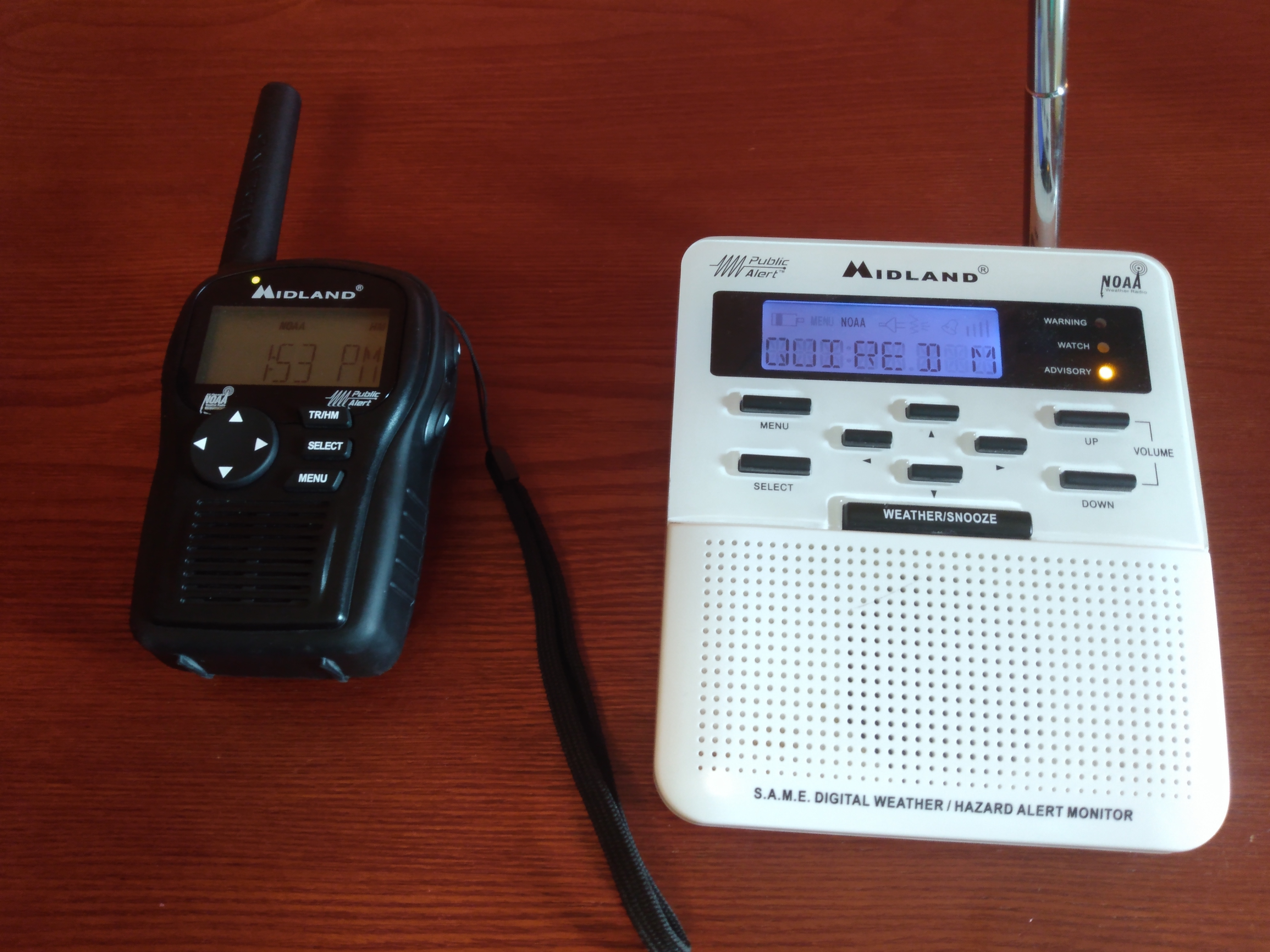
Example of two Midland weather radio receivers

In 1976, Environment Canada's Weatheradio service was launched and expanded to 30 locations in roughly 10 years. In the early-1990s, increased government investment permitted major expansion of the network to its largest size of 230 sites.

In most locations, the service broadcast on one of seven specially-allocated VHF radio frequencies, audible only on dedicated "weather band" receivers or any VHF radio capable of receiving 10 kHz bandwidth FM signals centred on these assigned channels, which were located within the larger "public service band". The radio frequencies used by Weatheradio Canada were the same as those used by its American counterpart, NOAA Weather Radio (whose parent agency, the U.S. National Weather Service, is also a partner with the Meteorological Service of Canada). From 2004 to its decommissioning, the service used Specific Area Message Encoding (SAME) alerting technology to disseminate severe weather alerts. In the late 2010s, Environment Canada indicated that it would, in the future, add other hazard and civil emergency information (such as natural disasters, technological accidents, Amber alerts and terrorist attacks) to Weatheradio broadcasts. Such enhancements never came to fruition.

In some locations, primarily national parks, provincial parks and remote communities with little or no local media service, a transmitter operated by the Canadian Broadcasting Corporation carried the service on a standard AM or FM broadcast frequency. As of August 2007, most of these AM and FM transmitters were unlicensed by the CRTC under a special licence exemption granted to low-power non-commercial broadcasters.

In September 2020, Environment and Climate Change Canada began soliciting feedback on possible decommissioning of 48 of its 230 transmitters. ECCC stated that the transmitters were predominantly located in areas of overlapping coverage and where alternate methods of access (such as cell phones and the Internet) were available.

On May 26, 2021, through Required Weekly Tests sent over the network, ECCC announced Weatheradio Canada's transition into its new voice technology system, after 27 years using the Starcaster voices. The new voice used for the system was Nuance Tom from Nuance Communications, a newer version of the old NOAA Weather Radio voice used prior to 2016. This transition began on June 1st of that year, and while supposed to end on New Year's Eve of 2021, some stations held out into summer 2022 before making the switch.

On August 19, 2022, an announcement was sent on 8 transmitters in the network regarding the impending decommission of said transmitters within the next 6 months. The 8 transmitters announced for decommissioning were: Cooking Lake, AB; Saskatoon, SK; Orillia, ON; Brockville, ON; Fredericton, NB; Perth-Andover, NB; Aspen-Melrose, NS and Grand Falls, NL. Of these, Saskatoon and Orillia were spared while the remainder were discontinued.

The Administrative Message (SAME) of the shutdown announcement. Broadcast on the Weatheradio Canada transmitter in Saskatoon; station XLF322.

On February 23, 2026, ECCC announced that as part of the federal government's Comprehensive Expenditure Review, Weatheradio Canada and Hello Weather would be decommissioned nationwide effective three weeks later on March 16. The agency cited rising maintenance costs as the main factor. Continuous marine broadcasts, operated by the Canadian Coast Guard for maritime interests, remained in service. On March 16, Weatheradio Canada broadcast a repeated announcement informing listeners that the service had been permanently shut down.

On March 31, 2026, all weather radio stations across the country were shut down.

== Frequencies ==
Weatheradio Canada signals were transmitted using FM (10 kHz bandwidth), with band spacing of 25 kHz. These transmissions covered areas in around a 80-kilometre (50-mile) radius from the station, but this all depended on terrain, weather quality, and the antenna height above ground. It was estimated that over 90 percent of Canadians lived within range of a Weatheradio transmitter. The service used multiple frequencies:

- 162.400 MHz
- 162.425 MHz
- 162.450 MHz
- 162.475 MHz
- 162.500 MHz
- 162.525 MHz
- 162.550 MHz

At selected locations, low power broadcasts without the alert tone were transmitted on the regular FM or AM band. A Weatheradio receiver was not required to hear these broadcasts.

== Programming ==
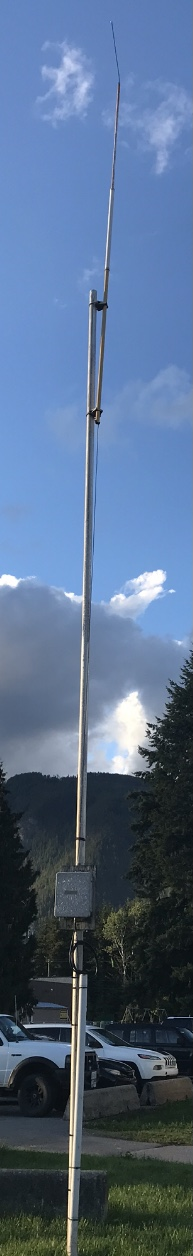
An AM Weatheradio Canada station antenna

Weather information was broadcast in both official languages (English, then French). Prior to June 2021, broadcasts in Quebec were in the opposite order. The language order became uniform after new systems were installed. Weather alert broadcasts were inserted within the normal playlist. Wind and wave marine forecasts are broadcast on a regular basis on transmitters located near marine zones. However, these and other forms of marine forecasts were more conveniently heard on the Canadian Coast Guard's continuous marine broadcasts, which (except for British Columbia) are not broadcast on weather-band frequencies. Weather broadcasts also included the UV index for the forecast day, and for the following day. The Air Quality Health Index forecast was broadcast at the end of the broadcast cycle for cities in the station's service area.

== Alerting ==
Whenever a weather or civil emergency alert was issued for any part of a Weatheradio Canada station's coverage area, many radios with an alert feature sounded an alarm or turned on upon detection of a 1,050 Hz attention tone that sounds just before the voice portion of an alert message. The specification calls for the Weatheradio Canada transmitter to sound the alert tone for ten seconds and for the receiver to react to it within five seconds. This system simply triggered the alarm or turned on the radio of every muted receiver within reception range of that station (in other words, any receiver located anywhere within the transmitter's broadcast area). Generally, receivers with this functionality are either older or basic models.

Many newer or more sophisticated alerting receivers can detect, decode and react to a digital signal called Specific Area Message Encoding (SAME), which allows users to program their radios to receive alerts only for specific geographical areas of interest and concern, rather than for an entire broadcast area. These advanced models may also have colored LED status lights which indicate the level of the alert as an "advisory", "watch" or "warning" (either amber or green for advisories, orange or yellow for watches and red for warnings).

When an alert was transmitted, the SAME header/data signal was broadcast first (heard as three repeated audio "bursts"), followed by the 1,050 Hz attention tone, then the voice message, then the end-of-message (EOM) data signal (repeated quickly three times). This encoding/decoding technology had the advantage of avoiding "false alarms" triggered by the 1,050 Hz tone itself in locations outside the intended warning area.

== Test Procedures ==
All Weatheradio Canada transmitters automatically conducted either a Required Weekly Test (RWT), or along with a Required Monthly Test (RMT). The test message was typically aired soon after 12:00 PM local time. Unlike RWTs, the RMT messages are accompanied by the 1,050 Hz attention tone after the initial SAME headers.

The test script is read by the female TTS voice as follows:

"Environment Canada has a message to broadcast: This is a required weekly test for [call sign]. I repeat, this is a required weekly test for [call sign]." "Environnement Canada a un message à diffuser: Ceci est un test hebdomadaire obligatoire pour [call sign]. Je répète, ceci est un test hebdomadaire obligatoire pour [call sign]"

== Former stations ==
Complete list of Weatheradio Canada's defunct transmitters.

=== Alberta ===
City of Licence	Frequency (MHz)	Call sign
Calgary	162.400	XLF-339
Cold Lake	162.525	VFZ-535
Cooking Lake	162.475	XOF-962
Drumheller	162.550	VBX-367
Edmonton	162.400	XLM-572
Edson	162.400	VBU-827
Fort Chipewyan	162.550	VFR-368
Fort McMurray	162.400	CFA-340
Grande Prairie	162.400	VBA-557
Highvale	162.475	VBU-829
Holden	162.550	CFB-635
Limestone Mountain	162.400	VDA-280
Long Lake	162.550	VFS-310
Flagstaff	162.400	CFB-636
Medicine Hat	162.550	VBK-616
Milk River	162.400	XKA-598
Peace River	162.475	VBU-374
Red Deer	162.550	VBC-336
St. Paul	162.400	CIM-235
Two Hills	162.525	VXF-723
Whitecourt	162.550	VBU-828
=== British Columbia ===
City of Licence	Frequency (MHz)	Call sign
Castlegar	162.550	XMD-482
Chilliwack	162.400	VFV-785
Cranbrook	162.400	VBI-853
Crawford Bay	162.425	VFD-904
Fort Nelson	162.550	VXB-567
Fort St. John	162.475	VXL-336
Kamloops	162.400 & 101.9 FM	CIT-768 & CBPL-FM
Kelowna	162.550	XMD-480
Masset	162.425	CKK-900
Penticton	162.475	XMD-481
Port Alberni	162.525	XLA-823
Port Hardy	162.525	VBH-444
Prince George	162.400	VGB-723
Prince Rupert	162.525	VXB-571
Revelstoke	162.400 & 1580 AM	CIT-386 & CBPK
Sandspit	162.500	XLK-894
Sicamous	162.400	CIQ-882
Texada Island	162.525	CGX-451
Ucluelet	162.525	CIZ-319
Vancouver	162.550	CGZ-555
Vernon	162.475	VFM-608
Victoria	162.400	XLA-726
=== Saskatchewan ===
City of Licence	Frequency (MHz)	Call sign
Broadview	162.475	VCB-462
Elbow	162.475	VBP-687
Estevan	162.400	VAM-595
Fort Qu'Appelle	162.400	CHZ-715
Lanigan	162.400	VBU-746
Prince Albert	162.400	VAR-551
Regina	162.550	XLM-537
Regina Beach	162.400	VBC-936
Saskatoon	162.550	XLF-322
Stranraer	162.400	VAR-554
Waseca	162.400	VDI-204
=== Manitoba ===
City of Licence	Frequency (MHz)	Call sign
Altona	162.425	VFN-684
Brandon	162.550	VAO-302
Dauphin	162.550	VBA-814
Falcon Lake	162.425	VXE-212
Gull Lake	162.525	CGN-875
Portage La Prairie	162.400	CKE-695
Long Point	162.550	VCI-386
Pointe du Bois	162.450	VXG-567
Reston	162.425	VXK-206
Riverton	162.400	XLF-471
Steinbach	162.475	VFN-683
Thompson	162.400	VXI-858
Winkler	162.550	VXM-345
Winnipeg	162.550	XLM-538
Woodridge	162.400	CGN-886
=== Ontario ===
City of Licence	Frequency (MHz)	Call sign
Algonquin Park	162.400 & 100.1 FM	VEF-956 & CJNK-FM
Algonquin Park East	101.3 FM	CJNK-FM-1
Algonquin Park West	101.3 FM	CJNK-FM-2
Atikokan	162.400	VFI-331
Barry’s Bay	162.525	VFK-722
Beardmore	162.475	XLJ-892
Belleville	162.425	VFK-720
Brockville	162.425	VFK-721
Bruce Peninsula Park	90.7 FM	CBPS-FM
Collingwood	162.475	XMJ-316
Fort Frances	162.400	VDB-224
Goderich	162.400	XLT-839
Greater Sudbury	162.400	XLJ-898
Kawartha Lakes	162.400	VAW-217
Kenora	162.475	XLJ-890
Kingston	162.400	XJV-363
Kitchener	162.550	XMJ-330
Lavant	162.450	VBE-716
Little Current	162.475	XMJ-375
London	162.475	XLN-470
Marathon	162.550	VAT-341
Moose Creek	162.450	VBE-718
Mount Forest	162.450	XLN-600
Nipigon	162.550	XLJ-891
Normandale	162.450	VFI-621
North Bay	162.475	XLJ-893
Orillia	162.400	VBV-562
Ottawa-Gatineau	162.550	CZN-626
Parry Sound	88.9 FM	CBPO-FM
Paisley	162.425	XMJ-320
Pembroke	162.475	VAV-559
Peterborough	162.550	VEU-671
Ramore	162.400	VDB-885
Renfrew	162.425	VEA-549
Rosseau	162.550	VBT-629
Sarnia-Oil Springs	162.400	XJV-492
Sault Ste. Marie	162.400	XMJ-373
Temagami	162.400	CFE-261
Thorold	162.475	VAD-320
Thunder Bay	162.475	XMJ-374
Timmins	162.475	VDB-886
Toronto	162.400	XMJ-225
Wawa	162.475	VAT-404
Windsor	162.475	VAZ-533
=== Quebec ===
City of Licence	Frequency (MHz)	Call sign
Amqui	162.400	XLR-528
Baie-Trinité	162.475	VDD-596
Beauce	162.525	XLR-527
Blanc-Sablon	162.400	XLR-526
Carleton-sur-Mer	162.500	VDD-598
Charlevoix	162.475	XLR-611
Chibougamau	162.550	XLR-749
Dégelis	162.550	VDD-225
Gaspé	162.550	VDD-597
Gatineau-Ottawa	162.550	CZN-626
Harrington Harbour	162.550	XLR-606
Îles-de-la-Madeleine	162.550	VOR-668
Kegaska	162.475	XLR-529
La Malbaie	162.400	
La Tuque	162.475	VBB-499
Lac-Mégantic	162.550	XLR-420
Matane	162.475	VDD-596
Mingan	162.400	VOR-669
Mont-Laurier	162.550	XLR-969
Montmagny	162.400	VDD-464
Montréal	162.550	XLM-300
Mont-Tremblant	162.475	VAF-367
Québec	162.550	XLM-369
Rimouski	162.550	XLR-617
Rivière-au-Renard	162.475	XLR-525
Rouyn-Noranda	162.400	XLR-748
Saguenay	162.550	XLR-285
Sainte-Anne-Des-Monts/Sept-Îles	162.550	XLR-519
Saint-Félicien	162.475	VBS-906
Sherbrooke	162.475	XLR-412
Trois-Rivières	162.400	XLR-411
Val-d'Or	162.475	XLR-747
Ville-Marie	162.550	XLR-750
=== New Brunswick ===
City of Licence	Frequency (MHz)	Call sign
Dalhousie	162.550	XLK-418
Edmundston	162.400	VFH-528
Fredericton	162.475	VCF-757
Millville	162.550	XLM-404
Miscou Island	162.550	CGZ-724
Moncton	162.550	XLM-467
Perth-Andover	162.500	VFH-526
Saint-Isidore	162.400	XLK-417
St. Stephen	162.475	XLM-490
Sussex	162.400	XLM-403
=== Prince Edward Island ===
City of Licence	Frequency (MHz)	Call sign
Charlottetown	162.400	XLM-647
O'Leary	162.475	XLK-645
Souris	162.525	XLK-644
=== Nova Scotia ===
City of Licence	Frequency (MHz)	Call sign
Aspen	162.400	XLK-499
Bridgewater	162.400	XLK-409
Chéticamp	162.475	XLW-263
Dingwall	162.550	XLM-667
East Bay	162.475	XLW-262
Halifax	162.550	XLK-473
Kingsville	162.550	
Middleton	162.550	XLK-497
New Tusket	162.550	XLK-496
Shelburne	162.550	XLK-410
Sydney	162.400	XLK-444
Truro	162.500	XLK-498
Yarmouth	162.475	XLW-573
=== Newfoundland and Labrador ===
City of Licence	Frequency (MHz)	Call sign
Birchy Lake	162.400	XLM-665
Brent's Cove	162.400	XLW-297
Carmanville	162.475	CKL-805
Conche	162.550	XLW-296
Corner Brook	162.550	XLW-200
Gander	162.400	XLM-616
Goose Bay	162.400	CZQ-768
Grand Falls	162.550	XLM-664
Hermitage	162.550	XLW-204
Labrador City	162.550	CZT-650
Mary's Harbour	162.475	CFD-876
Marystown	162.400	XLM-663
Plum Point	162.550	XLW-295
Port Rexton	162.550	XLM-615
Portland Creek	162.400	XLW-298
Red Rocks	162.550	XLW-202
St. Anthony	162.400	XLW-299
St. John's	162.400	XLM-614
Stephenville	162.400	XLW-201
Trepassey	162.550	XLM-662
=== Yukon ===
City of Licence	Frequency (MHz)	Call sign
Dawson City	162.550	CKP-965
Mayo	162.400	CKP-964
Tagish	162.550	VFS-369
Whitehorse	162.400	CIY-270
=== Northwest Territories ===
City of Licence	Frequency (MHz)	Call sign
Behchoko	162.475	CHR-950
Fort McPherson	162.450	CHR-956
Fort Providence	162.425	CHR-951
Fort Simpson	162.400	CHR-952
Fort Smith	162.425	CFM-468
Hay River	162.550	CIE-211
Inner Whaleback Rocks	162.550	XKI-403
Inuvik	162.400	VBU-996
Nahanni Butte	162.525	CHR-957
Tuktoyaktuk	162.475	CHR-955
Yellowknife	162.400	VBC-200
=== Nunavut ===
City of Licence	Frequency (MHz)	Call sign
Arviat	162.400	CKO-583
Cape Dorset	162.550	XJS-717
Iqaluit	162.550 & 93.3 FM	VEV-284 & CIQA-FM
Rankin Inlet	162.400	XJS-716

== See also ==
- Alert Ready
- Alberta Emergency Alert
- Interagency Volcanic Event Notification Plan
- Forecast region
- NOAA Weather Radio
- Emergency Alert System
- Specific Area Message Encoding
