= List of FIPS codes for Georgia =

This is the list of FIPS codes for Georgia — FIPS codes for each county in the state. - Weatheradios with WRSAME can also use these codes (prefixed with a 0).

- 13000 - Georgia (entire state)
- 13001 - Appling County
- 13003 - Atkinson County
- 13005 - Bacon County
- 13007 - Baker County
- 13009 - Baldwin County
- 13011 - Banks County
- 13013 - Barrow County
- 13015 - Bartow County
- 13017 - Ben Hill County
- 13019 - Berrien County
- 13021 - Bibb County
- 13023 - Bleckley County
- 13025 - Brantley County
- 13027 - Brooks County
- 13029 - Bryan County
- 13031 - Bulloch County
- 13033 - Burke County
- 13035 - Butts County
- 13037 - Calhoun County
- 13039 - Camden County
- (13041 - former Campbell County)
- 13043 - Candler County
- 13045 - Carroll County
- 13047 - Catoosa County
- 13049 - Charlton County
- 13051 - Chatham County
- 13053 - Chattahoochee County
- 13055 - Chattooga County
- 13057 - Cherokee County
- 13059 - Clarke County
- 13061 - Clay County
- 13063 - Clayton County
- 13065 - Clinch County
- 13067 - Cobb County
- 13069 - Coffee County
- 13071 - Colquitt County
- 13073 - Columbia County
- 13075 - Cook County
- 13077 - Coweta County
- 13079 - Crawford County
- 13081 - Crisp County
- 13083 - Dade County
- 13085 - Dawson County
- 13087 - Decatur County
- 13089 - DeKalb County
- 13091 - Dodge County
- 13093 - Dooly County
- 13095 - Dougherty County
- 13097 - Douglas County
- 13099 - Early County
- 13101 - Echols County
- 13103 - Effingham County
- 13105 - Elbert County
- 13107 - Emanuel County
- 13109 - Evans County
- 13111 - Fannin County
- 13113 - Fayette County
- 13115 - Floyd County
- 13117 - Forsyth County
- 13119 - Franklin County
- 13121 - Fulton County
- 13123 - Gilmer County
- 13125 - Glascock County
- 13127 - Glynn County
- 13129 - Gordon County
- 13131 - Grady County
- 13133 - Greene County
- 13135 - Gwinnett County
- 13137 - Habersham County
- 13139 - Hall County
- 13141 - Hancock County
- 13143 - Haralson County
- 13145 - Harris County
- 13147 - Hart County
- 13149 - Heard County
- 13151 - Henry County
- 13153 - Houston County
- 13155 - Irwin County
- 13157 - Jackson County
- 13159 - Jasper County
- 13161 - Jeff Davis County
- 13163 - Jefferson County
- 13165 - Jenkins County
- 13167 - Johnson County
- 13169 - Jones County
- 13171 - Lamar County
- 13173 - Lanier County
- 13175 - Laurens County
- 13177 - Lee County
- 13179 - Liberty County
- 13181 - Lincoln County
- 13183 - Long County
- 13185 - Lowndes County
- 13187 - Lumpkin County
- 13189 - McDuffie County
- 13191 - McIntosh County
- 13193 - Macon County
- 13195 - Madison County
- 13197 - Marion County
- 13199 - Meriwether County
- 13201 - Miller County
- (13203 - former Milton County)
- 13205 - Mitchell County
- 13207 - Monroe County
- 13209 - Montgomery County
- 13211 - Morgan County
- 13213 - Murray County
- 13215 - Muscogee County*
- 13217 - Newton County
- 13219 - Oconee County
- 13221 - Oglethorpe County
- 13223 - Paulding County
- 13225 - Peach County
- 13227 - Pickens County
- 13229 - Pierce County
- 13231 - Pike County
- 13233 - Polk County
- 13235 - Pulaski County
- 13237 - Putnam County
- 13239 - Quitman County
- 13241 - Rabun County
- 13243 - Randolph County
- 13245 - Richmond County
- 13247 - Rockdale County
- 13249 - Schley County
- 13251 - Screven County
- 13253 - Seminole County
- 13255 - Spalding County
- 13257 - Stephens County
- 13259 - Stewart County
- 13261 - Sumter County
- 13263 - Talbot County
- 13265 - Taliaferro County
- 13267 - Tattnall County
- 13269 - Taylor County
- 13271 - Telfair County
- 13273 - Terrell County
- 13275 - Thomas County
- 13277 - Tift County
- 13279 - Toombs County
- 13281 - Towns County
- 13283 - Treutlen County
- 13285 - Troup County
- 13287 - Turner County
- 13289 - Twiggs County
- 13291 - Union County
- 13293 - Upson County
- 13295 - Walker County
- 13297 - Walton County
- 13299 - Ware County
- 13301 - Warren County
- 13303 - Washington County
- 13305 - Wayne County
- 13307 - Webster County
- 13309 - Wheeler County
- 13311 - White County
- 13313 - Whitfield County
- 13315 - Wilcox County
- 13317 - Wilkes County
- 13319 - Wilkinson County
- 13321 - Worth County
- 13510 - Columbus*

*Note that Columbus is not an independent city as the number suggests. It is a consolidated city-county with Muscogee County, incorporating everything outside of Fort Benning.
