= Weather radio =

Specialized radio receiver for weather forecasts

The Midland WR-120EZ weather radio.

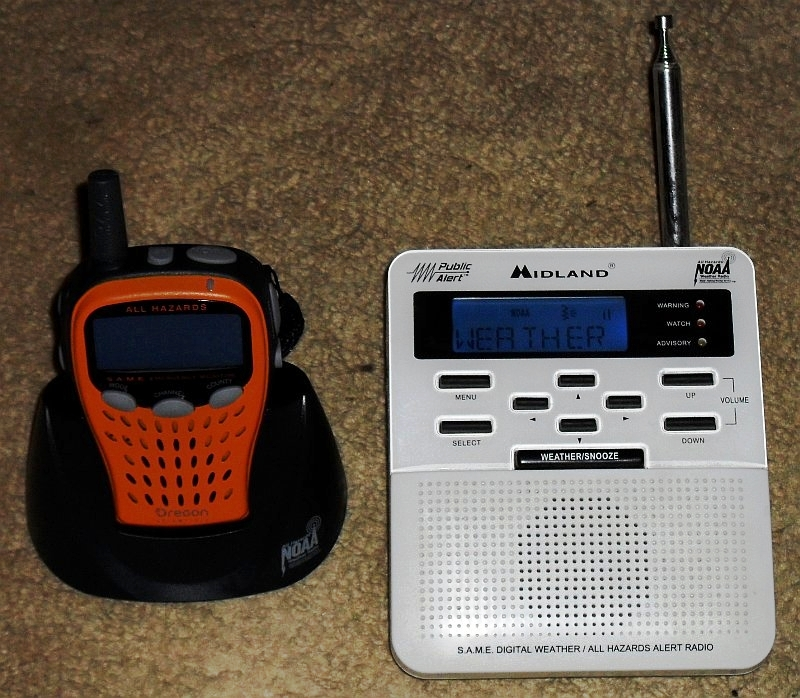
Two types of weather radio receivers; the common Midland home weather radio (model WR-100) to the right is often the most popular and known unit sold in the United States, while the orange Oregon Scientific model on the left is portable and water-resistant for outdoor use.

A weather radio is a specialized radio receiver that is designed to receive a public broadcast service, typically from government-owned radio stations, dedicated to broadcasting weather forecasts and reports on a continual basis, with the routine weather reports being interrupted by emergency weather reports whenever needed. Weather radios are typically equipped with a standby alerting function—if the radio is muted or tuned to another band and a severe weather bulletin is transmitted, it can automatically sound an alarm and/or switch to a pre-tuned weather channel for emergency weather information. Weather radio services may also occasionally broadcast non-weather-related emergency information, such as in the event of a natural disaster, a child abduction alert, or a terrorist attack.

They generally broadcast in a pre-allocated very high frequency (VHF) range using FM. Usually a radio scanner or a dedicated weather radio receiver is needed for listening, although in some locations a weather radio broadcast may be re-transmitted on an AM or FM broadcast station, on terrestrial television stations, or local public, educational, and government access (PEG) cable TV channels or during weather or other emergencies.

== Weather radio receivers ==
Weather radios are generally sold in two varieties: home (stationary) or portable use. Portable models commonly offer specialized features that make them more useful in case of an emergency. Some models use crank power, in addition to mains electricity and batteries, in case of a power outage.

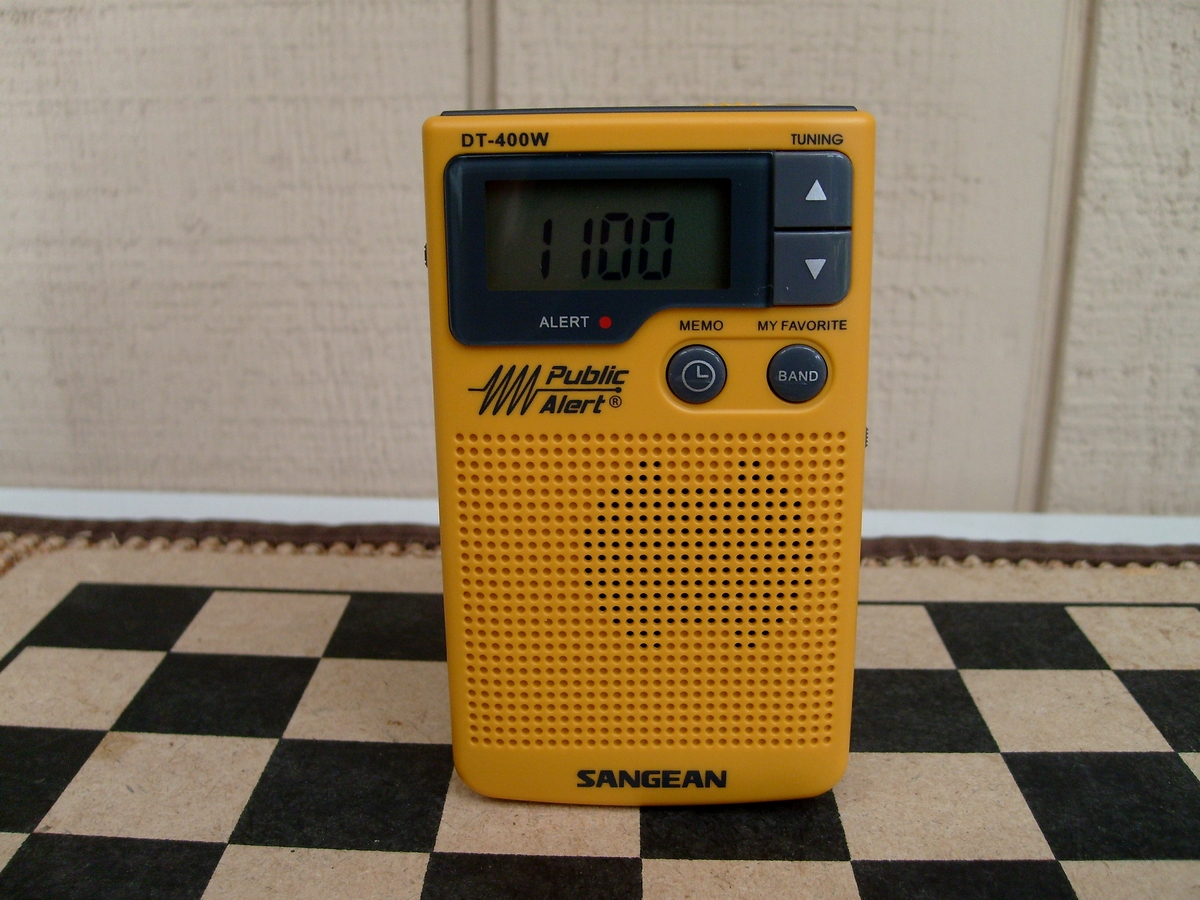
Sangean DT-400W (10711303835)

Smaller hand-held weather receivers generally do not support the Specific Area Message Encoding (SAME) alert type encoding (though there are some that do) but allow hikers and other explorers to listen to weather reports without packing a heavy and bulky base station radio. Some models have a built-in flashlight and can double as a cellphone charger. Some also serve as a more general emergency radio and may include multiband and two-way communication capability. "Scanner" radios designed to continuously monitor the VHF-FM public service band are already able to receive weather channels.

A Gorman-Redlich CRW-S weather radio

Besides SAME alerting capability, modern weather radio receivers, especially those that are compliant with CTA standard 2009-B, may include visual alerting elements (e.g., multicolored LED indicator lights) and allow for the use of external devices (e.g., pillow vibrators, bed shakers, strobe lights, and loud sirens, which attach via an accessory port) to alert those who are deaf or hearing impaired.

== Global weather radio services ==
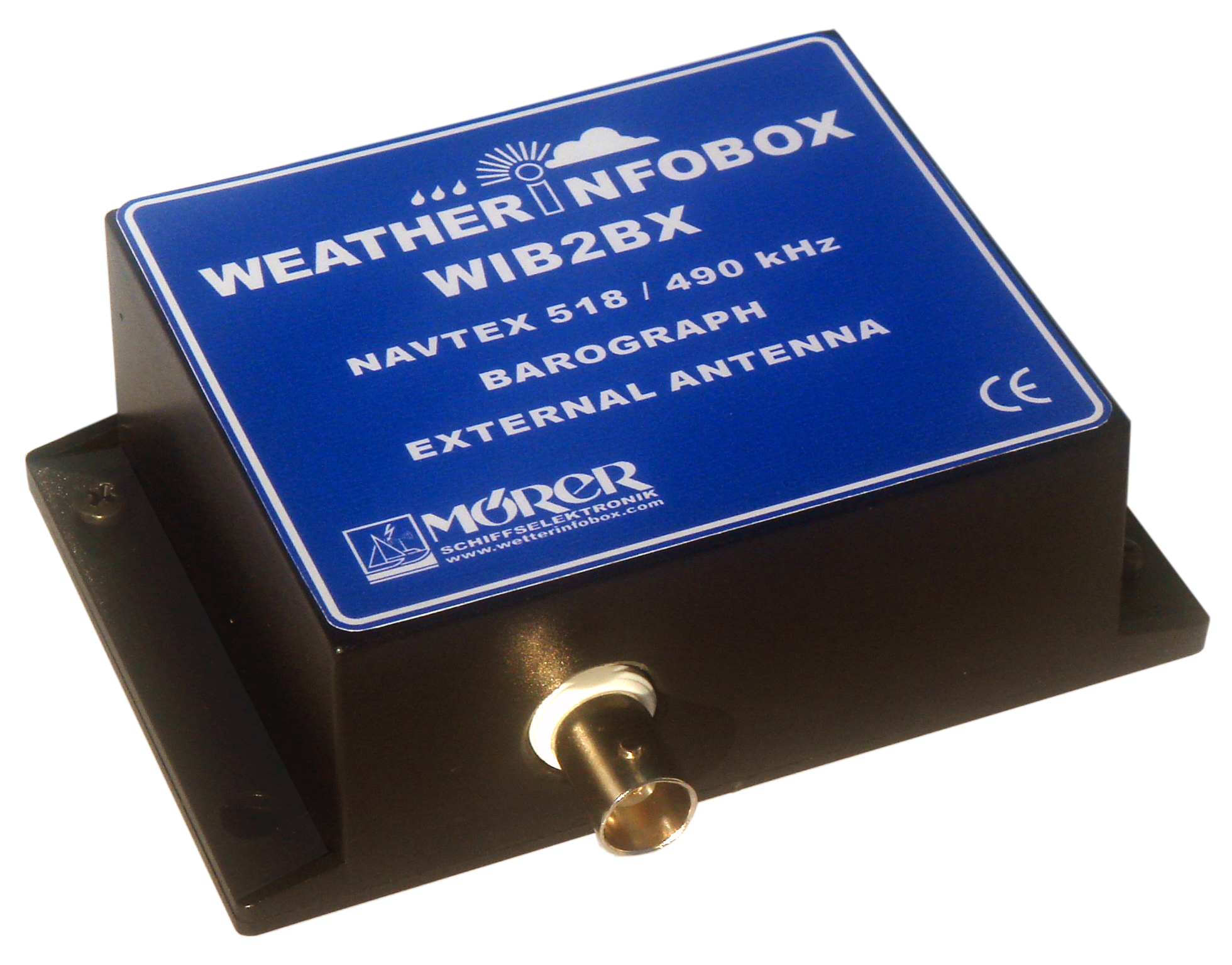
Wib2bx

Both private and commercial seagoing vessels need accurate weather reports, in order to avoid storms that might damage or capsize the vessel, or make paying passengers uncomfortable. One such service is Navtex, which is a low-frequency facsimile radio service.

== North American weather radio services ==
National weather radio frequencies for U.S., Canada, and Mexico# WX8-WX12 frequency order and inclusion varies
Frequency	WX channel	Marine channel	Radio preset
162.400 MHz	WX2	36B	1
162.425 MHz	WX4	96B	2
162.450 MHz	WX5	37B	3
162.475 MHz	WX3	97B	4
162.500 MHz	WX6	38B	5
162.525 MHz	WX7	98B	6
162.550 MHz	WX1	39B	7
161.650 MHz	WX#	21B	blank
161.750 MHz	WX#	23B	blank
161.775 MHz	WX#	83B	blank
162.000 MHz	WX#	28B	ASM 2
163.275 MHz	WX#	113B	blank

The National Oceanic and Atmospheric Administration, Environment Canada, the Mexican Seismic Alert System and the Bermuda Weather Service operate their government weather radio stations on the same marine VHF radio band, using FM transmitters, and the same seven frequencies (162.400-162.550 MHz) as NOAA Weather Radio (NWR). Bermuda only uses 162.550 (land) and 162.400 (marine). NWR transmitters operate VHF-FM between 5–1,000 watts. NWR channels operating in the range of 162.3625-162.5875 MHz (WX1-WX7) have a band spacing of 25 kHz and may have bandwidths up to 16 kHz. The original "weather" frequency was 162.550 MHz, with 163.275 MHz initially recommended as a backup and later dropped due to interference problems with other federal agencies.

NOAA Weather Radio, Weatheradio Canada and SARMEX all refer to the seven stations by their frequencies:
162.400, 162.425, 162.450, 162.475, 162.500, 162.525 and 162.550 MHz.

Other channel designations such as WX1 through WX7 "have no special significance but are often designated this way in consumer equipment" and "other channel numbering schemes are also prevalent/possible" according to NOAA and USCG. Ordering channels by when they were established (WX1, WX2…) is "becoming less 'popular' over time than a numerical ordering of channels." Weather radios may list stations in the order of their WX#, or by a "Preset Channel" number 1 through 7 in ascending frequency order.

The "WX#" format is continued from WX8 up to WX12 on some lists and radios to include 163.275 MHz and or one or more of the Canadian continuous marine broadcast (CMB) frequencies 161.650, 161.750, 161.775, 162.000. Unlike WX1-WX7 typically ordered by frequency adoption by NWS, there is no consistent frequency inclusion nor assignment for WX8-WX12. Effective January 1, 2019, channels 2027 (161.950 MHz, 27B) and 2028 (162.000 MHz, 28B) are designated as ASM 1 and ASM 2 respectively for application specific messages (ASM) as described in Recommendation ITU-R M.2092. 163.275 MHz was formerly used by the NWS for coordination during power outages.

All stations in the United States, Canada, and Bermuda transmit a 1,050 Hz attention tone immediately before issuing a watch or warning, (In Canada a 1050 Hz Tone is only used for a Severe Thunderstorm Warning, Tornado Warning and the Required Monthly Test) and this is used as both an attention tone and as a way to activate many radios that do not have SAME technology.

FEMA-provided audio file of the SAME alert header, followed by the combined 853 Hz and 960 Hz Warning Alert Tone, followed by the SAME end-of-message (EOM) tone

All U.S. and Canadian stations transmit SAME codes a few seconds before the 1,050 Hz attention tone that allows more advanced receivers to respond only for certain warnings that carry a specific code for the local area. SAME codes are defined for counties, parishes, territories, forecast regions, or marine zones, and are set using preassigned six-digit FIPS county codes (in the U.S.) or Canadian Location Codes (in Canada). The SAME code protocol also includes an end-of-message (EOM) tone which is made up of three short data bursts of the binary 10101011 calibration then "NNNN", which some radios will use to mute the speaker after the alert broadcast has been completed.

=== United States ===
NOAA Weather Radio (NWR; also known as NOAA Weather Radio All Hazards) is an automated 24-hour network of more than 1,000 radio stations in the United States that broadcast weather information directly from a nearby National Weather Service office. A complete broadcast cycle is about 3 to 8 minutes long and consists of weather forecasts and local observations. Normal broadcast cycles are interrupted when severe weather advisories, warnings, or watches are issued. NOAA Weather Radio occasionally broadcasts other non-weather related events such as national security statements, natural disaster information, environmental and public safety statements (such as an Amber alert) sourced from the Federal Communications Commission's (FCC) Emergency Alert System.

=== Canada ===
In Canada, Weatheradio Canada transmitted in both official languages (English and French) from 234 sites across Canada. The Canadian broadcast cycle featured the forecast for the forecast region where the transmitters were located, as well as any neighbouring forecast regions there may be. It also included the current conditions for local cities, towns, airports or military bases and the air quality forecast is the last part of the cycle before it switched to the other language to repeat the cycle in either English or French. Weatheradio Canada was permanently discontinued on March 16, 2026.

=== Caribbean/Atlantic ===
Bermuda Radio (call-sign ZBR) is a weather radio station in Bermuda working under the Government of Bermuda.

Bermuda has only one station dedicated purely for weather, on 162.55 MHz from Hamilton, now operated by the Bermuda Weather Service with tropical weather forecasts from NOAA. It has a second station, however, for marine conditions and forecasts, ZBR (operated by the Bermuda Maritime Operations Centre), at 162.4 MHz.

=== Mexico ===
Mexico has since launched its own weather radio system, SARMEX (Sistema De Alerta De Riesgos Mexicano, or Mexican Hazard Warning System) for coverage of its cities, which also implements the Mexican Seismic Warning System. Some Mexican alert radios also support activation by a two-tone alert for another type of risk warning.

== European weather radio services ==
=== Germany ===
In Germany, the Deutscher Wetterdienst broadcasts marine weather reports and weather warnings via longwave and shortwave transmissions.

== Commercial weather radio services ==
The weather radio band is part of the marine VHF radio band reserved for governmental services. However, most standard AM and FM broadcast radio stations provide some sort of private weather forecasting, either through relaying public-domain National Weather Service forecasts, partnering with a meteorologist from a local television station (or using a meteorologist hired by the station, common when a radio station is a sister station of their TV counterpart or has a news and forecast-sharing agreement), affiliating with a commercial weather service company, or (in the most brazen cases) copying a commercial service's public forecasts without payment or permission. In Canada, the weather information issued by Environment Canada are protected under crown copyright but it is possible to obtain a license to redistribute their weather information

Accuweather (through United Stations) and The Weather Channel (through Westwood One's NBC Radio Network) both operate large national weather radio networks through standard AM and FM stations. Brookstone licensed Accuweather's data service for their popular 5 Day Wireless Weather Watcher Cast Forecaster.

Microsoft's MSN Direct was a popular data service that included weather forecasting sent over US FM radio signals from 2004 to 2012. It was used by Microsoft Spot watches and Oregon Scientific clocks.

== See also ==
- Category:Weather radio
- Category:Emergency population warning systems in Canada
- Category:Emergency population warning systems
- Emergency population warning
- Emergency communication system
- Emergency notification system
- Mexican Seismic Alert System
- Public Warning System (Singapore)
- Integrated Public Alert and Warning System
- Wireless Emergency Alerts
- ShakeAlert
- Standard Emergency Warning Signal
- Emergency Alert Australia
- All clear
- J-Alert
- Civil defense siren
- International Early Warning Programme
- Warning system
- Indian Ocean Tsunami Warning System
- Tsunami warning system
- Earthquake warning system
- Earthquake Early Warning (Japan)
- Emergency Response Information Network
- EMWIN
