= Maritime Operations Centre =

Bermuda government agency

The Maritime Operations Centre is a Bermuda government agency to provide support for maritime operations. It is located in St. George's and operates under the Department of Marine and Port Services.

It is composed of the following departments:

- Rescue Coordination Centre
- Vessel Traffic Coastal Radar Surveillance
- Coast Radio Station (Weather radio, call-sign: ZBR)
- 406 MHz Beacon Registry
- Long Range Identification and Tracking
- Ship Security Alerting System
- Seaport Security and the ISPS Code
