= Mexican Seismic Alert System =

Earthquake warning system covering portions of central and southern Mexico

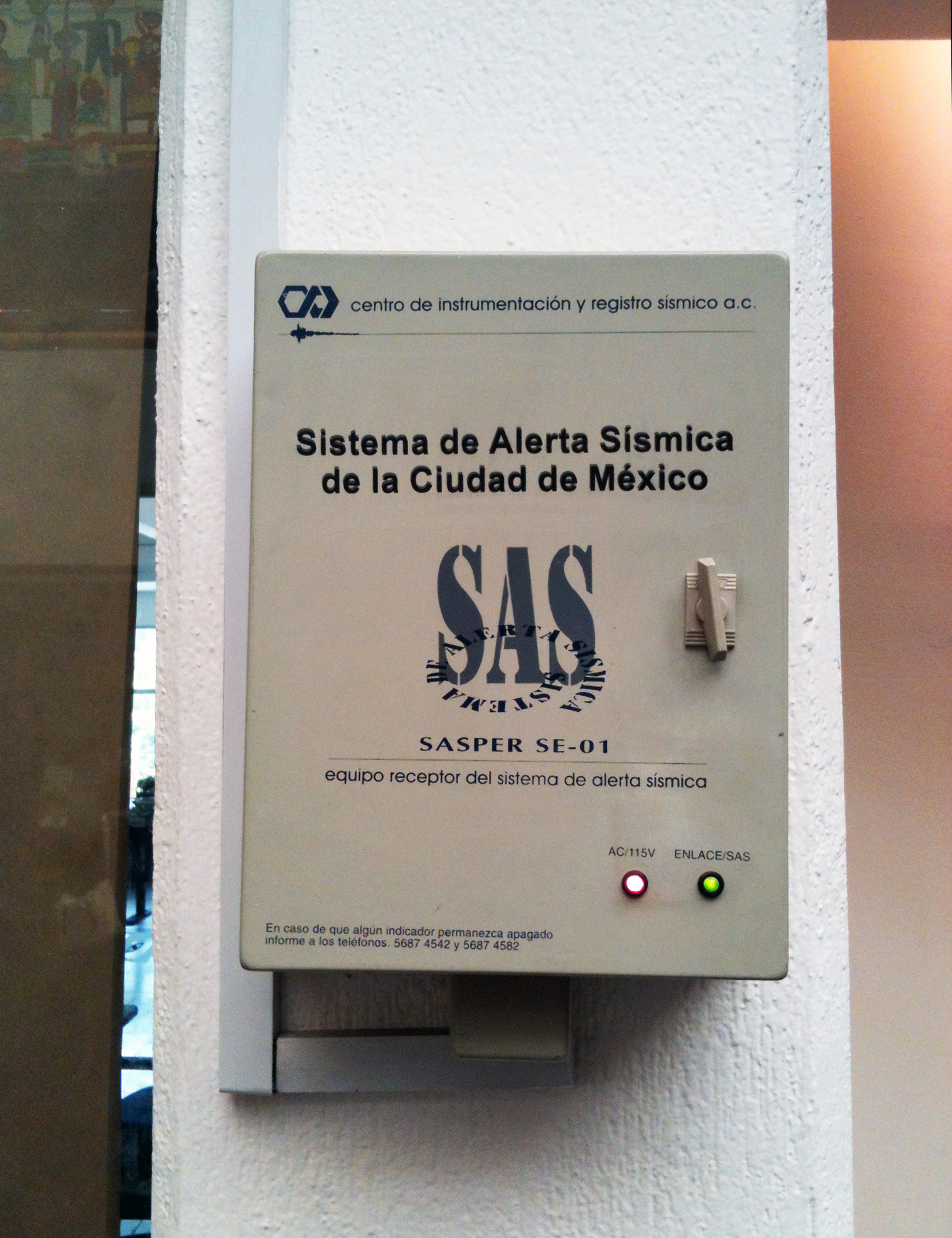
A SASMEX receiver installed at the Museo Universum in Mexico City

The Mexican Seismic Alert System (Spanish: Sistema de Alerta Sísmica Mexicano or SASMEX) is the earthquake warning system covering portions of central and southern Mexico. It currently provides up to 60 seconds' warning of earthquakes to Mexico City, Acapulco, Chilpancingo, Morelia, Puebla, Oaxaca, Guadalajara, Colima and Toluca. SASMEX is administered by a non-profit civil association, the Center for Seismic Instrumentation and Registry (Spanish: Centro de Instrumentación y Registro Sísmico, A. C. or CIRES). The SASMEX sensor network serving Mexico City has been regarded as the first earthquake early warning system issuing alerts available to the public. SASMEX supplies regular information of all kinds, including reports of earthquakes of all magnitudes, and drills, via X, under the name AlertaSísmica SASMEX. All earthquakes are reported as #TenemosSismo (we have an earthquake); warnings of serious ones are delivered as #AlertaSismica (earthquake alert).

== History ==
The 1985 Mexico City earthquake prompted a national rethink of earthquake and emergency preparedness measures. The government of Mexico City sponsored the placement of accelerometers throughout the city in 1987, allowing data to be obtained on ground movements in the area. With the support of the local government, CIRES developed Mexico City's earthquake alert system, which began operating with 12 sensors in 1991 and has been publicly available since 1993.

CIRES was tapped to develop a similar system for the state of Oaxaca after it was struck by a M_{w} 7.4 earthquake in 1999. Beginning in 2000, CIRES and the state government developed an early warning system for Oaxaca, which entered into service in 2003. The two formerly separate earthquake warning systems were combined in 2005 to form SASMEX.

== Current sensors ==
The SASMEX system contains 97 sensors, primarily along the coast from Puerto Vallarta south, in the mountains of the state of Guerrero, and in northern Puebla and across most of Oaxaca. An expansion to the network of 28 sensors, currently in development, would add monitoring capabilities in Oaxaca's Isthmus region, inland portions of Veracruz, and the western two-thirds of Chiapas.

Historically, CIRES has been able to provide 60 seconds of warning time to Mexico City in the event of an earthquake along the southern coast, and as many as 30 seconds to the city of Oaxaca if an earthquake occurs near the coast of that state, with shorter lead times for earthquakes centered closer to the city.

== Transmission of alerts ==
CIRES transmits earthquake early warning alerts through a network of VHF stations similar to the NOAA Weather Radio service in the United States, including use of Specific Area Message Encoding, but with faster lead times in order to issue more timely warnings within two seconds or less. CIRES offers alert systems for buildings and personal use, which also come pre-installed with the official warning sound used for earthquake alerts in Mexico. On its network of transmitters, CIRES issues required weekly tests every three hours to ensure receivers are connected to its network, as well as earthquake warnings when necessary. More than 90,000 users in Mexico City, including almost all public schools, have receivers. The Mexico City Metro additionally receives SASMEX alerts, although not for public dissemination but instead to stop trains or delay departures as necessary.

CIRES alerts are also transmitted by major broadcasters in Mexico City, Toluca, Acapulco, Chilpancingo and Oaxaca and, as of 2015, through Mexico City's municipal loudspeaker network with more than 8,200 speakers installed.

During the 2012 Guerrero–Oaxaca earthquake, the SASMEX system (at that time not fully unified) provided 25 seconds of warning to Oaxaca, 45 seconds to Chilpancingo and Acapulco, and 80 seconds to Mexico City. The system was also effective during the 2017 Chiapas earthquake.

SASMEX's warning was activated a few seconds after the shaking was felt in Mexico City for the 19 September 2017 earthquake, rendering it ineffective for the only seismic event that has caused loss of life in Mexico City since the 1985 Mexico City earthquake. Some people may have taken the alert for a continuation of an earthquake drill held three hours before. Six stations reported, and alerts 12 to 48 seconds before the shock were also provided to Oaxaca, Acapulco, Chilpancingo, Guadalajara, Colima and Puebla (this has not been verified by an external agency).
