= .bm =

Top-level Internet domain for Bermuda

- Introduced: March 1993
- TLD type: Country code TLD
- Sponsor: Government of Bermuda
- Intended use: Entities connected with Bermuda
- Actual use: Gets some use in Bermuda
- Registration restrictions: Must be company, organisation, charity or individual located in Bermuda
- Structure: Registrations permitted directly at second level or at third level beneath various labels
- Registry website: www.bermudanic.bm

.bm is the Internet country code top-level domain (ccTLD) for Bermuda.

== History ==
It was originally delegated in March 1993 to Bermuda College and was redelegated to the Registrar General of Bermuda, the de facto manager of the .BM domain, in 2007.

== Structure ==
Registrations are available under the second level .bm domain, as well as a number of third level domains.

.bm top level domain names
Top level domain name	Intended purpose
.bm	Personal use
.biz.bm	Small businesses & professionals
.net.bm	Small businesses & professionals
.co.bm	Companies & commercial purposes
.com.bm	Companies & commercial purposes
.org.bm	Organisations, specialty, professional Bodies
.edu.bm	Organisations, specialty, professional Bodies

== See also ==
- Internet in Bermuda
- Internet in the United Kingdom
