= MetVUW =

Metvuw
- Creator: James McGregor
- Website: http://www.metvuw.com
- Current status: online

Metvuw Weather and Climate service is run by James McGregor. The site was formerly associated with Victoria University of Wellington (hence the VUW acronym), but is now run independently. Much of the weather content and forecast material is available directly from the website, free. A range of different weather information is available, as different pages, under the following headings.

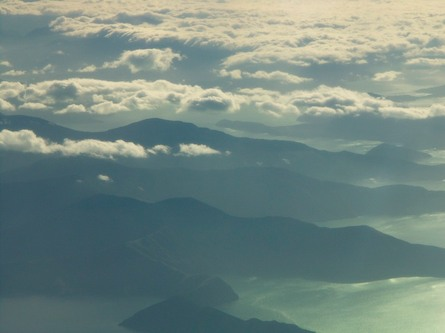
Marlborough Sounds January 2006

== Metvuw home ==
Featuring updates advice about the service, and 'photo of the day' as well as links to previous photos of the day. Many images of quirky and unusual weather-related phenomena are to be found, especially clouds of the Mammatus variety.

== Satellite imagery ==
9 panels of monochrome satellite derived cloud pictures are shown, in 3 hour intervals, ending in current time slot. Images can be enlarged. Data provided by MetService, Image enhancement by Metvuw, Himawari satellite data courtesy of Japanese Meteorological Agency.

== Weather radar ==
3 panels each showing 9 locations throughout New Zealand, at 3 hour intervals, ending in current time slot. Colour coding is derived from 'reflectivity' (DBz). Images can be enlarged. Data provided by MetService, Image enhancement by Metvuw.

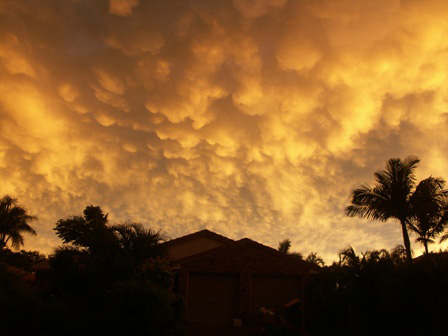
Mammatus Cloud Christmas Day 2005

Radiosondes (weather balloons) measuring upper air temperatures and winds are routinely launched from five stations around New Zealand. At Whenuapai, Paraparaumu and Invercargill they are launched at 1100 and 2300 NZT. At Raoul Island they are launched daily at 1100 NZT. The upper air data are displayed on tephigrams.

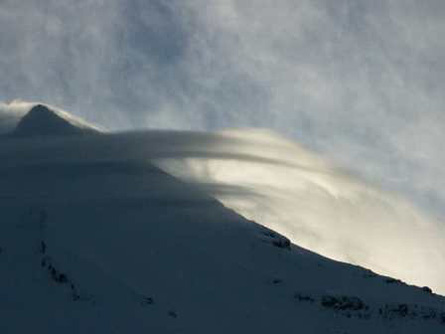
Mount Taranaki 2005

== Forecast charts ==
A large range between 1 and 10 day forecasts are available, delivering 4 and 40 images, respectively, spaced at +6 hour intervals, beginning with the forecast time.

These weather forecast charts are generated by software written and maintained by James McGregor. The data used is obtained from the United States National Weather Service. These charts are updated approximately every 6 hours and provide forecasts up to 240h ahead of the time they were issued.

== Current NZ weather ==
Selections are available for temperature, precipitation, pressure and wind. A national map is shown with data at each of many significant locations.

== Ocean weather ==
Data is available for each of 7 seas/oceans. Up to 10-day thumbnails deliver 40 images, spaced at +6 hour intervals, beginning with the forecast time.

== See also ==
- Meteorological Service of New Zealand Limited
- World Meteorological Organisation
