= ZFM-FM =

Radio station

- Freeport, Bahamas; Bahamas
- Broadcast area: Grand Bahama, Bahamas
- Frequency: 102.1 MHz
- Branding: Mix 102.1 FM

Programming
- Format: Rhythm & Blues, hip hop, Caribbean Music

History
- Call sign meaning: ZF (former ITU prefix under United Kingdom rule) Mix FM

Technical information
- ERP: 5,000 watts
- Transmitter coordinates: 26°31′11″N 78°41′38″W

ZFM-FM is a Rhythm and Blues, hip hop and Caribbean music radio station in Freeport, Bahamas.
