= Meteocentre =

American weather website

- Website type: Science / Weather
- Available in: bilingual (french and english)
- Creator: Christian Pagé
- Website: meteocentre.com
- Commercial: no
- Launched: 1 July 1995; 31 years ago
- Current status: Online

Meteocentre (also named UQAM Weather Centre) is a website displaying real-time weather information for North America and Europe organized in three different portals, each adapted for a given area and named after a town part of the region of interest: 1) Montréal, for Québec, 2) Toulouse, for France and 3) Reading, for the United Kingdom. The website created in 1994 is maintained by its founder Christian Pagé, actually a research engineer at CERFACS, in collaboration since 2009 with Jean-François Caron, a research scientist at the Met Office, and hosted by the Atmospheric Sciences Group at the Université du Québec à Montréal (UQAM).

Its Quebec portal, the UQAM-Montreal Weather Centre, is deemed as being the most complete weather data website for Montreal and Quebec.

== History ==
Meteocentre started in 1994 as an HTML page gathering the best links to online weather info for Montreal. At the time, this page created by Christian Pagé was only locally available on one of UQAM's server. In July 1995, the site was launched in the public domain, initially under the name 'Atmospheric Sciences' and adopted later the name "Montreal Weather Centre". Until 1999, the site was mainly a collection of external links.

Thanks to Christian Pagé initiative, UQAM subscribed in 1999 to the Unidata program, a US program broadcasting real-time weather data to the academic community. Many weather products specific to Meteocentre will then be developed in the coming years: hourly surface observations and analyses, numerical weather prediction charts, satellite imagery, lightning maps, etc. In October 2000, the site adopted its current web address: meteocentre.com.

Following Christian Pagé stay at Météo-France in 2001, a new portal devoted to French weather was created and whether products were extended to Europe. News maps from the Canadian numerical weather prediction model were also made available thanks to a privilege access of UQAM to Environment Canada's weather data. Also in 2001, discussion forums for Quebec and France were launched and MeteoAlerte Quebec, a collaborative website inspired by the former French Oragenet project, was launched. In July 2002, MeteoAlerte was extended to France and grown rapidly thanks to a fruitful partnership with Infoclimat. In the same year, Meteocentre adopted its current name: 'UQAM Weather Centre'.

In 2009, a legal agreement was signed between Météo-France, MeteoAlerte and Infoclimat to share MeteoAlerte weather reports with Météo-France. During the same year, a United Kingdom portal was launched following the growing involvement of Jean-François Caron, a former university colleague of Christian Pagé. This new collaboration allowed to add many new products from numerical weather prediction models and to extend the reach of MeteoAlerte in Europe.

== Honor ==
In 2009, Christian Pagé was awarded the Alcide-Ouellet prize by the Canadian Meteorological and Oceanographic Society for his contribution to broadcasting weather information on the internet.
