= NOAA Weather Radio =

Weather radio network in the United States

- Type: Weather radio/civil emergency services
- Branding: NOAA Weather Radio All Hazards
- Country: United States
- Availability: National (through radio transmitters, some commercial radio and television outlets, and Internet availability via streaming audio from other organizations)
- Founded: 1954 (aviation weather) first station KWO35 New York City, NY.; 1958 (general/marine weather); by National Oceanic and Atmospheric Administration
- Radio stations: 5-1,250W VHF-FM transmitters
- Owner: NOAA/National Weather Service
- Parent: National Oceanic and Atmospheric Administration
- Launch date: 1950s (in selected cities); 1967 (nationwide)
- Official website: www.weather.gov/nwr/

NOAA Weather Radio (NWR), also known as NOAA Weather Radio All Hazards, is an automated 24-hour network of VHF FM weather radio stations in the United States which broadcast weather information directly from a nearby National Weather Service office. Its routine programming cycle includes local or regional weather forecasts, synopses, climate summaries or zone/lake/coastal waters forecasts. It can be shortened to specifically include hazardous weather outlooks, short-term forecasts, special weather statements or tropical weather summaries during hazardous weather events. It occasionally broadcasts other non-weather-related events such as national security statements, natural disaster information, environmental and public safety statements such as Amber alerts, civil emergencies, fires, evacuation orders, and other hazards sourced from the Federal Communications Commission's (FCC) Emergency Alert System. NOAA Weather Radio uses automated broadcast technology that allows segments featured in one broadcast cycle to be recycled into another and enables consistent, regular updating of segments to each transmitter.

Weather radios are widely sold online and in retail stores that specialize in consumer electronics in Canada and the US. They are available in many supermarkets and drugstores in the southern and midwestern US, which are particularly susceptible to severe weather—large portions of these regions are commonly referred to as "Tornado Alley". They are also useful in a region called "Dixie Alley", which is in the southeastern portion of the United States. This region also hosts large quantities of tornadoes and severe thunderstorms, similar to "Tornado Alley".

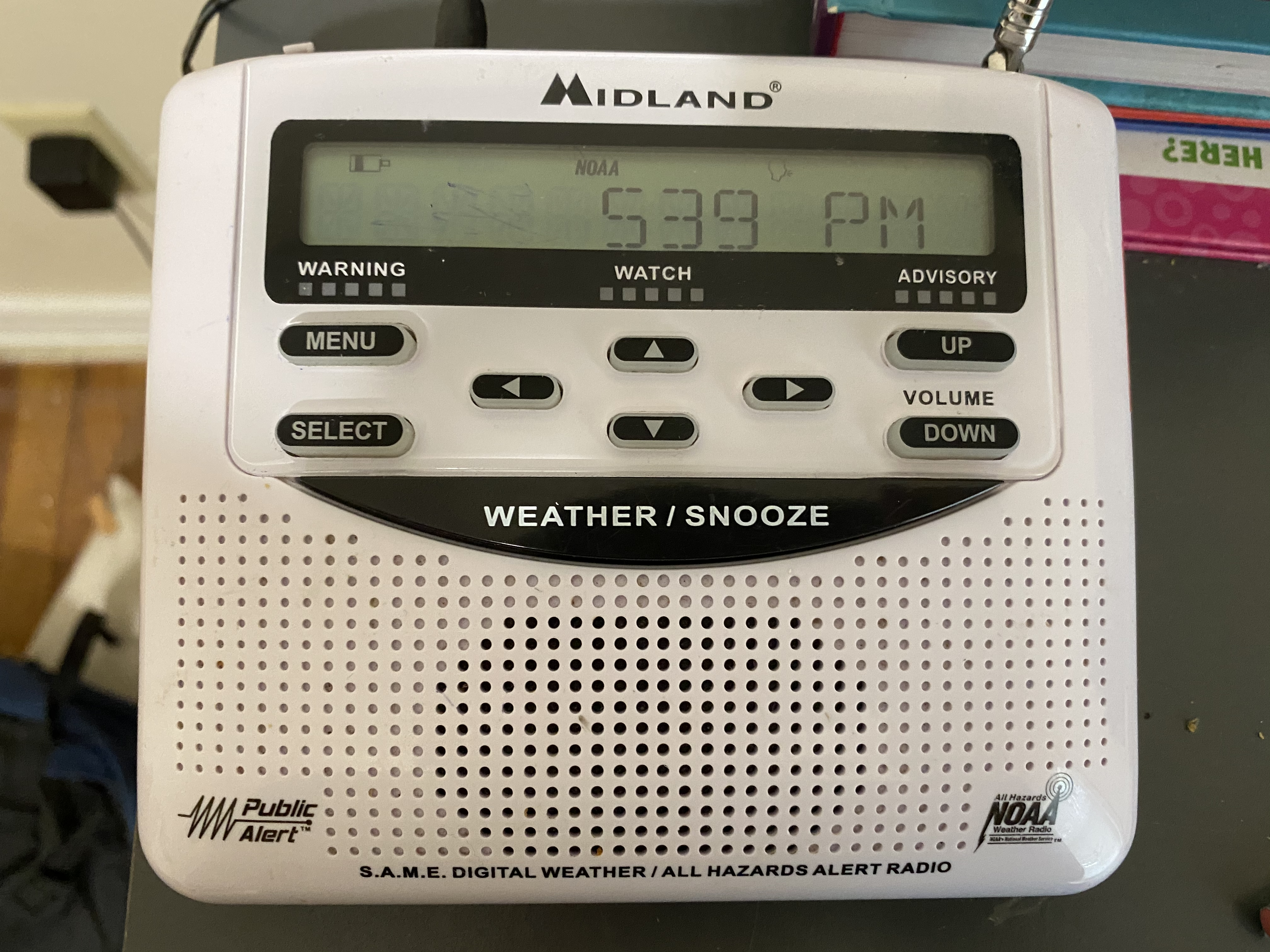
Midland WR-120 Weather Radio

NOAA Radio Station in Robinson, TX (November 23, 2021)

== History ==
The U.S. Weather Bureau first began broadcasting marine weather information in Chicago and New York City on two VHF radio stations in 1960 as an experiment. Proving to be successful, the broadcasts expanded to serve the general public in coastal regions in the 1960s and early 1970s. By early 1970, ESSA listed 20 U.S. cities using 162.55 MHz and one using 163.275 "ESSA VHF Radio Weather." Later, the U.S. Weather Bureau adopted its current name, National Weather Service (NWS), and was operating 29 VHF-FM weather-radio transmitters under the National Oceanic and Atmospheric Administration (NOAA) which replaced ESSA in 1970. The service was designed with boaters, fishermen, travelers, and more in mind, allowing listeners to quickly receive a "life-saving" weather bulletin from their local weather forecast office (WFO), along with routinely updated forecasts and other climatological data in a condensed format at any time of the day or night. The general public could have the latest weather updates when they needed them, and the benefit of more lead time to prepare during severe conditions. In 1974, NOAA Weather Radio (NWR), as it was now called, reached about 44 percent of the U.S. population over 66 nationwide transmitters. NWR grew to over 300 stations by the late 1970s.

Local NWS staff were the voices heard on NWR stations from its inception until the late 1990s when "Paul" was introduced. The messages were recorded on tape, and later by digital means, then placed in the broadcast cycle. This technology limited the programming variability and locked it into a repetitive sequential order. It also slowed down the speed of warning messages when severe weather happened, because each NWS office could have up to eight transmitters. "Paul" was a computerized voice using the DECtalk text-to-speech system. "Paul's" voice was dissatisfactory and difficult to understand; thus "Craig", "Tom", "Donna" and later "Javier" were introduced in 2002 using the Speechify text-to-speech system from SpeechWorks (not to be confused with the iOS app of the same name). A completely new voice from the VoiceText text-to-speech system, also named "Paul", was introduced in 2016 and implemented nationwide by late in the year. Live human voices are still used occasionally for weekly tests of the Specific Area Message Encoding (SAME) and 1,050 Hz tone alerting systems, station IDs, and in the event of system failure or computer upgrades. They will also be used on some stations for updates on the time and radio frequency.

In the 1990s, the National Weather Service adopted plans to implement SAME technology nationwide; the roll-out moved slowly until 1995, when the U.S. government provided the budget needed to develop the SAME technology across the entire radio network. Nationwide implementation occurred in 1997 when the Federal Communications Commission (FCC) adopted the SAME standard as part of its new Emergency Alert System (EAS). NOAA Weather Radio's public alerting responsibilities expanded from hazardous weather-only events to "all hazards" being broadcast.

=== Expansion ===
In the wake of the 1965 Palm Sunday tornado outbreak, one of the key recommendations from the U.S. Weather Bureau's storm survey team, was the establishment of a nationwide radio network that could be used to broadcast weather warnings to the general public, hospitals, key institutions, news media, schools, and the public safety community. Starting in 1966, the Environmental Science Services Administration (ESSA) started a nationwide program known as "ESSA VHF Weather Radio Network." In the early 1970s, this was changed to NOAA Weather Radio. The service was expanded to coastal locations during the 1970s in the wake of Hurricane Camille based upon recommendations made by the Department of Commerce after the storm in September 1969.

Since then, a proliferation of stations have been installed and activated to ensure near-complete geographical coverage and "weather-readiness", many of which have been funded by state emergency management agencies in cooperation with the NOAA to expand the network, or state public broadcasting networks. To avoid interference and allow for more specific area coverage, the number of frequencies in use by multiple stations grew to two with the addition of 162.400 MHz in 1970 followed by the third (162.475) in 1975 with the remaining four (162.425, 162.450, 162.500 & 162.525) coming into use by 1981.

In the 1950s, the Weather Bureau started with KWO35 in New York City and later added KWO39 in Chicago. By 1965, it had added KID77 in Kansas City, home to the Severe Local Storms Center, as the third continuous VHF radio transmitter with the fourth, KBA99 in Honolulu, operating by January 1967.

Denver became the 60th NWR station in September 1972 and by December 1976 there were roughly 100 stations transmitting on three channels in December 1976. Growth accelerated in the mid-1970s with NWR reaching 200 radio stations in May 1978 with WXK49 in Memphis, Tennessee; 300 in September 1979 with WXL45 in Columbia, Missouri; and by 1988, the NWS operated about 380 stations covering approximately 90 percent of the nation's population. This grew to over 500 radio stations by May 1999, and over 800 by the end of 2001. As of January 2020, there were about 1,032 stations in operation in fifty states, Puerto Rico, the U.S. Virgin Islands, American Samoa, Guam, and Saipan, with over 95% effective coverage.

== Operations ==
The NOAA Weather Radio network is provided as a public service by the National Oceanic and Atmospheric Administration. NOAA also provides secondary weather information, usually limited to marine storm warnings for sea vessels navigating the Atlantic and Pacific Oceans, to HF band "time stations" WWV and WWVH. These shortwave radio stations continuously broadcast time signals and disseminate the "official" U.S. Government time, and are operated by the Department of Commerce's National Institute of Standards and Technology.

=== Radio ===
The radio service transmits weather and marine forecasts (where applicable) and other related information, without any interruptions. In addition, NWR works in cooperation with the FCC's Emergency Alert System (EAS), providing comprehensive severe weather alerts and civil emergency information. In conjunction with federal, state and local emergency managers and other public officials, NWR has the ability to broadcast alerts and post-event information for all types of hazards, including natural (such as earthquakes or avalanches), human-made (such as chemical releases or oil spills), technological (such as nuclear power plant emergencies) and other public safety (such as "Amber alerts" or 9-1-1 telephone outages). Listening to a NOAA Weather Radio station requires a VHF radio receiver or scanner capable of receiving at least one of seven specific VHF-FM channels within the frequency range of 162.400 through 162.550 MHz, collectively known as the "Weather Band". For example, a receiver that only tunes in standard AM or FM broadcast stations will not suffice.

=== Television ===
Many cable television systems and some commercial television stations will, during EAS activation, rebroadcast the audio of a warning message first heard on their local NWR station, to alert viewers of a severe weather event or civil emergency, usually with the issuance of a tornado warning or tornado emergency, especially in tornado-prone areas of the country.

== Programming ==
=== Broadcast schedule ===
Local NOAA offices update the content broadcast over NOAA Weather Radio transmitters on a regular basis, according to the following schedule:

Local time	Update
01:00–12:00	Area climate summary (played in 15-minute intervals during this period)
04:30	Regional forecast (updated)
05:00–07:00	Regional weather synopsis (updated at least once during this period)
07:00	Hazardous weather outlook and call for action for NWS-trained SKYWARN volunteer weather spotters (if warranted)
07:00	Regional climate summary (recorded sometime between 18:00 the previous night and 07:00 each day)
10:30	Regional forecast (updated)
12:00	Hazardous weather outlook and call for action for NWS-trained SKYWARN volunteer weather spotters (if warranted)
13:00–15:00	Three- to five-day extended forecast (updated twice a day during this period)
15:30	Regional forecast (updated)
16:00–22:00	Regional weather synopsis (updated at least once during this period)
17:00–21:00	Area climate summary (played in 15-minute intervals during specific days of the week)
20:30	Regional forecast (updated)

Updates to routine observational products are typically recorded once per hour, and are broadcast at five or 10, and at 15 minutes past the hour.

=== Broadcast routine ===
New Typical National Weather Service Forecast
for Pittsburgh, Pennsylvania

Old Typical National Weather Service Forecast
for Columbus, Ohio

NOAA Weather Radio station WXL40's programming.
Hazardous Weather Outlook for Harrisburg, Pennsylvania and vicinity. The product also includes a tropical update.

As a continuous spoken weather service, NOAA Weather Radio All Hazards maintains a multi-tier concept for relaying meteorological observations, routine forecasts, and weather hazards to the general public. Actual forecasts and offered products vary by the area serviced by the transmitter. During severe weather situations, Watch Information Statements for government-designated jurisdictions served by the local NWR station are typically inserted within the station's normal playlist of routine products; a special severe weather playlist temporarily suspends most regularly scheduled routine products in the event National Weather Service-issued warnings (mainly severe thunderstorm, tornado or flash flood warnings) are in effect for the station's broadcast area, which solely incorporate watch, warning and Special Weather Statements, and any active Short-Term Forecasts and Hazardous Weather Outlooks.

Segment	On-air updates	Description
Hourly Weather Roundup	:05/:10/:15 past the hour	A one- to two-minute segment outlining the current weather conditions for the NWR station's service region, detailing the most recent hourly observation for the main reporting station (consisting of current sky condition, air temperature, dew point, humidity, wind speed/direction and barometric pressure, as well as apparent temperature and gusts when applicable), current observations within 80 miles, then current observations within 200 miles of the WFO's area of responsibility, and finally an abbreviated observation summary for the main reporting station. If no report is available from the main reporting station, the report from the closest observation site will be substituted. In some locales, if a regularly-reported station has no available report, the message "the report from [city] was not available" will be broadcast. The regional portion may be condensed to a roundup format if the temperatures are within a 5 °F range or if sky conditions are the same or differ limitedly at each given reporting site. Occasionally, due to technical or other problems, the previous hour's observations segment may be included in the product playlist as long as 15 minutes into the next hour, after which it is removed until updated information is available.
Hazardous Weather Outlook	7:00 a.m. and 12:00 p.m. (if needed)	This segment overviews the information about potential thunderstorm activity (including any areas forecast to be under threat of severe thunderstorms), heavy rain or flooding, winter weather, wildfire, extremes of heat or cold, or other conditions that may pose a hazard or threat to travel, life or property over the next seven days. Occasionally, a NWS WFO may update the Hazardous Weather Outlook while an event is ongoing or if forecast models denote changes from previous forecasts. Depending on the NWS office, it may either state all weather hazards from Day 1–7 or Day 1 separately from Day 2–7.
Regional Weather Synopsis/Summary	Every 5–6 hours (starting from 3:00 or 5:00 a.m. depending on the station)	A report that provides a brief overview of weather events from the previous or current day within the region, followed by an outlook of expected weather from the current time to the next few days.
Regional Climate Summary	Every 15 minutes (overnights, mornings and evenings)	A summary includes information on the minimum and maximum temperatures recorded the previous day; 30-year temperature averages and historical temperature extremes. It also includes wind speed data, sky cover data, historical humidity extremes, humidity averages, the day's recorded weather conditions and heating with(out) cooling degree day data. Depending on the areas, the sunrise and sunset times for the next two days are stated within the summary or as a separate report. Some stations broadcast this first report as early as 1:00 a.m. and the last report as late as 12:00 p.m.
Regional Forecast	4:00 a.m. and 3:30 p.m. (more if needed)	A report that provides the forecasts for the next seven days for all the counties across the station's coverage area. In case the time for the updates on another segment has not come yet, this forecast will typically be broadcast on a looped format.
Short Term Forecast	Randomized times	A localized, event-driven report used to provide the public with detailed weather information during significant or rapidly changing weather conditions during the next 3–6 hours. This forecast will often mention the position of precipitation as detected by radar. In most areas, this forecast product is not included during routine programming, but will be included when severe weather threatens the listening area.
Special Weather Statement	Randomized times	A regional event-driven report used to provide the public with details of the upcoming significant weather event, such as a major winter storm, a heat wave, or potential flooding. A significant weather advisory may be issued within a Special Weather Statement, often if thunderstorm activity whether severe or not is occurring in, or approaching an area.
Record Information Announcement	Randomized times	A segment providing newly set records for coldest/warmest maximum or minimum temperature and maximum precipitation.
Zone Forecast	Depending on the office	A text forecast for local beaches issued by coastal stations, including coastal hazard information such as that pertaining to rip currents. In more coastal offices, this forecast is scheduled to play every cycle, compared to every half hour in more inland offices.
River Forecast	If needed	This forecast is only broadcast if there is a potential for flooding or it is occurring, which would then be included with the hazardous weather outlook. Daily river forecasts are issued by the 13 river forecast centers using hydrologic models based on variables such as rainfall, soil characteristics and precipitation forecasts. Some forecasts, especially those in mountainous regions, also provide seasonal snow pack and peak flow forecasts. A separate forecast, River and Small Stream Observations, is broadcast in areas in and outside the 13 river forecast centers and is only broadcast following a significant hydrological event featuring information on crests and present and forecasted flood stages.
Lake Forecast		A forecast that is issued by most stations in the Great Lakes region to explicitly state expected weather conditions within the marine forecast area through the next five days. The report addresses expected wave heights and small-craft advisories currently in effect.
Coastal Waters Forecast		A forecast stating expected weather conditions and wave heights within the marine forecast area through the next five days.
Tropical Weather Summary	Every three hours (only if needed)	An event-driven report provides an information summary on any active tropical cyclones. Activity summaries for the Atlantic Basin are typically included with stations located in states near the Gulf of Mexico, Caribbean Sea and Atlantic Ocean, while stations along the West Coast receive summaries concerning the Pacific Ocean. Depending on the station and associated Weather Forecast Office, listeners can hear this report every half hour.
Ultraviolet Index		A daily exposure index played on some NOAA stations. The ultraviolet (UV) index is categorized by the maximum exposure of the sun's rays during the peak hours of sunlight. It ranges in the following numbers/categories: 1-2 (Low), 3-5 (Moderate), 6-7 (High), 8-10 (Very High), and 11+ (Extreme)

These are additional products that are included in the broadcast cycle occasionally (but are broadcast at randomized times, depending on the individual transmitter[s]):

- Air Quality Index Statement
- Agricultural Forecast
- Area Forecast Discussion
- Area Weather Update
- Daily/Monthly Hydrometeorological Products
- Heat Index Forecast
- High Seas Forecast
- Hydro-Met Data Report
- Miscellaneous Hydrologic Data
- Miscellaneous Local Product
- Miscellaneous River Product
- Public Information Statement
- Offshore Forecast
- Quantitative Precipitation Forecast
- State Forecast
- Suppression Forecast
- Tabular State Forecast
- Terminal Aerodrome Forecast
- Travellers Forecast

== Weather radio receivers ==
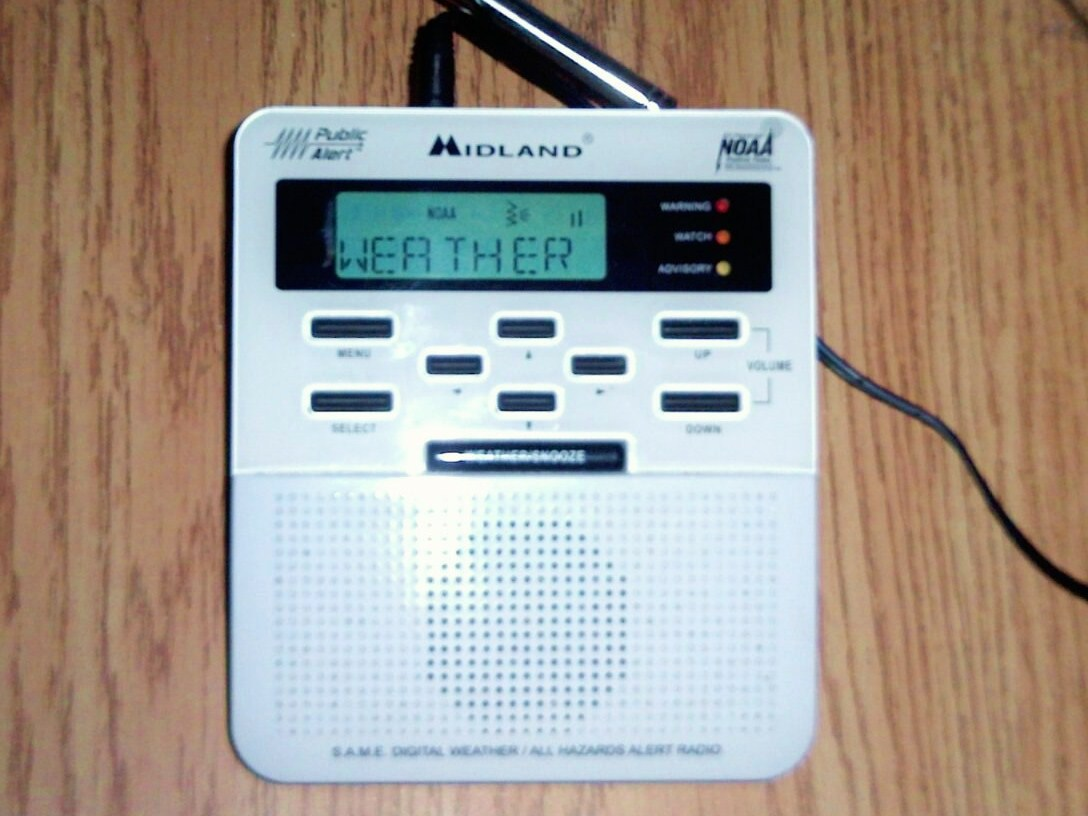
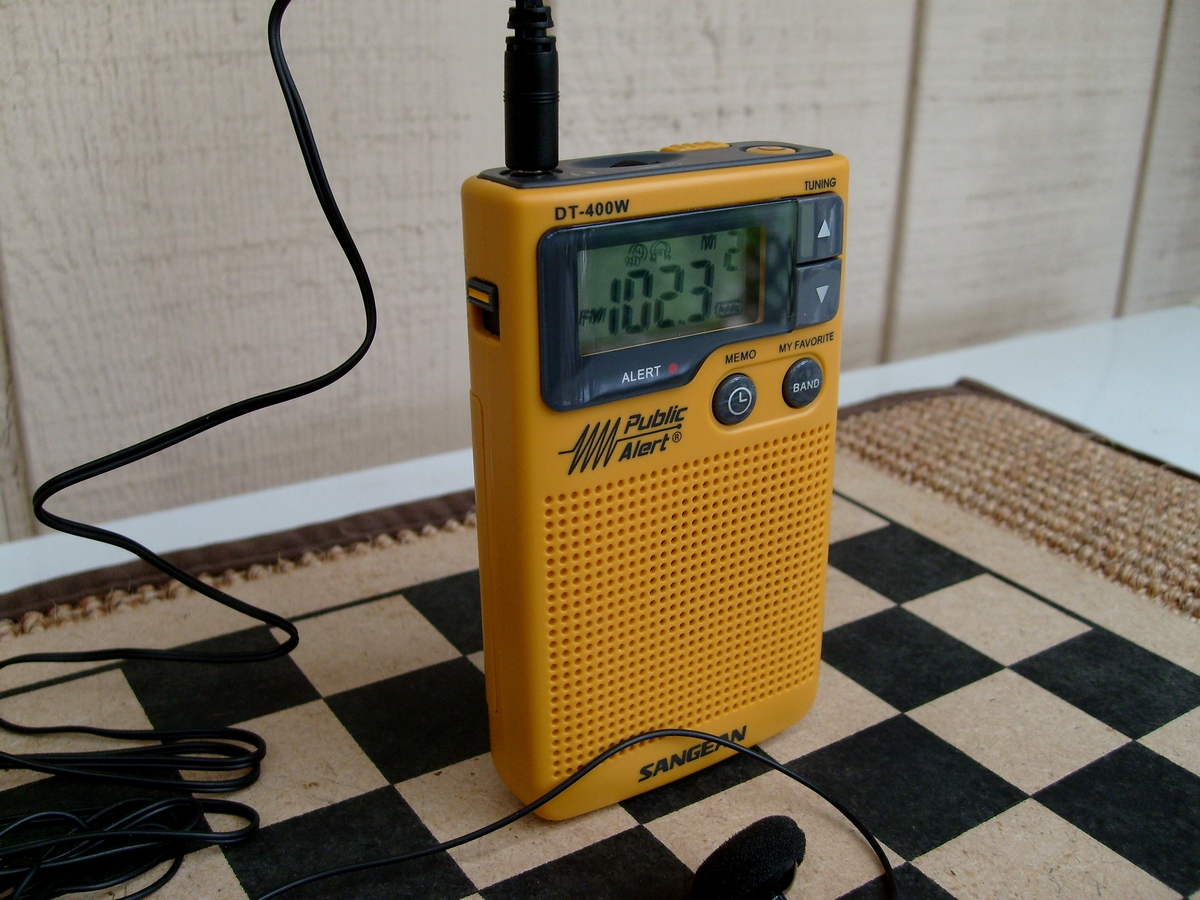
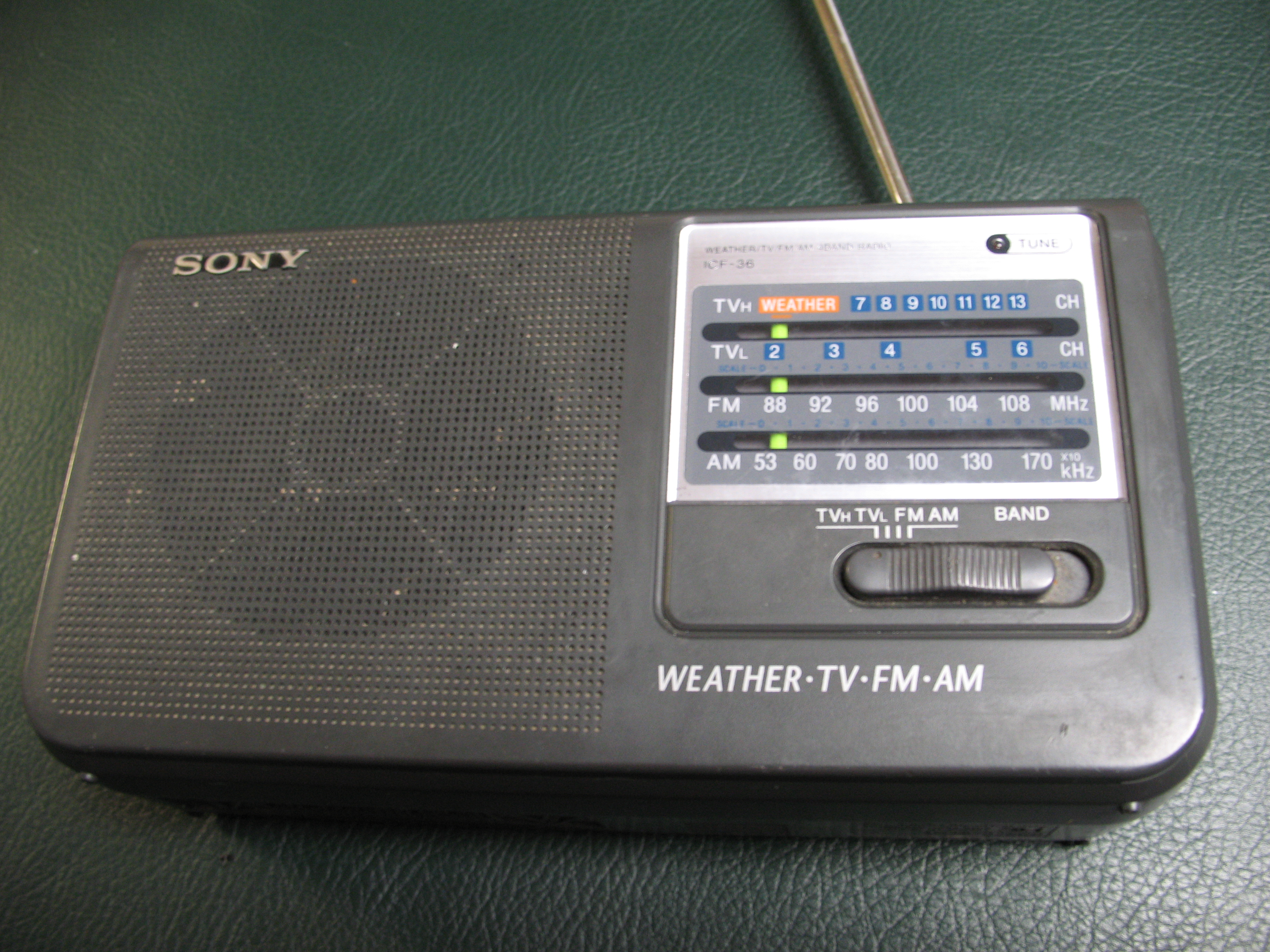
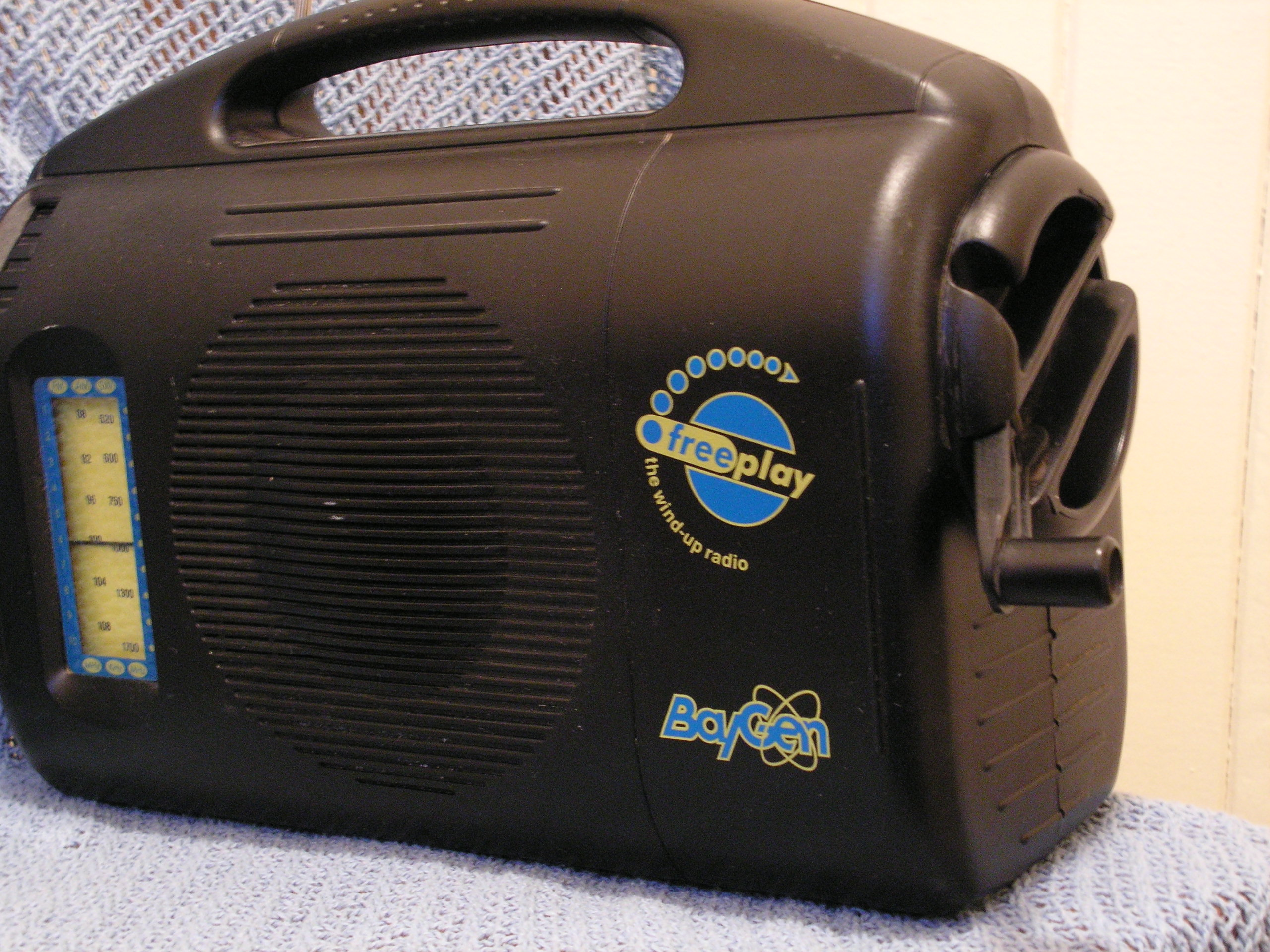
Clockwise from top: rack-mountable Gorman-Redlich CRW-S, yellow handheld Sangean DT-400W*, hand-crank BayGen Freeplay, portable Sony ICF-36, and white Midland WR100* base station weather radios
*Public Alert-certified

There are a variety of different types of weather radio receivers available in the U.S., including:

- Professional-grade receivers, typically rack-mounted, for use by broadcast radio and television stations and public agencies who are responsible for acting on or retransmitting weather and emergency alert broadcasts.
- Base-station consumer radios powered by commercial AC power (often with a battery backup).
- Hand-held battery-powered radios, suitable for use by hikers, boaters, and in emergency preparedness kits.
- Hand-crank portable radios that do not require AC or battery power, especially designed for use in emergency preparedness kits.
- Weather radio receivers integrated as an auxiliary function into other devices, such as GMRS radios, portable televisions, FM radios, etc.
- Radio receiver modules, such as the Si4707 from Silicon Labs, designed for electronics experimenters and project builders have in the past been available.

Historically, it was not uncommon to sell portable radios that featured AM, FM, and TV audio (VHF channels 2–13), with the weather band included some distance down the dial from TV channel 7 (after the U.S. digital TV conversion, the television sound function of these radios became obsolete).

One of the early consumer weather alert radios (model KH6TY) was designed and manufactured by Howard (Skip) Teller, who was issued a patent on the alerting mechanism and was instrumental in the design of the PSK31 Digipan software and hardware, and the Amateur radio NBEMS emergency communications system.

Since April 2004, radio models marketed as "Public Alert-certified" must include these features and meet certain performance criteria, as specified in electronics industry standard CEA-2009.

The price of a consumer-grade weather radio varies depending on the model and its extra features.

== Radio frequencies used ==
National Weather Radio frequencies for U.S. and Mexico (et al.)# WX8-WX12 frequency order and inclusion varies
Frequency	WX Channel	Marine channel	Radio preset
162.400 MHz	WX2	36B	1
162.425 MHz	WX4	96B	2
162.450 MHz	WX5	37B	3
162.475 MHz	WX3	97B	4
162.500 MHz	WX6	38B	5
162.525 MHz	WX7	98B	6
162.550 MHz	WX1	39B	7
161.650 MHz	WX8	21B	blank
161.750 MHz	WX#	23B	blank
161.775 MHz	WX9	83B	blank
162.000 MHz	WX#	28B	ASM 2
163.275 MHz	WX#	113B	blank

The United States' NWS and Mexico's SARMEX operate their government weather radio stations on the same marine VHF radio band, using FM transmitters, and the same seven frequencies (162.400 – 162.550 MHz) as NOAA Weather Radio (NWR). Bermuda only uses 162.550 (land) and 162.400 (marine).

NWR transmitters operate VHF-FM between 5–1,000 watts. NWR channels operating in the range of 162.3625–162.5875 MHz (162.4–.55 ± 37.5 kHz) have a band spacing of 25 kHz and may have bandwidths up to 16 kHz. The original "weather" frequency used by multiple stations was 162.550 MHz, followed by 162.400 in 1970, 162.475 in 1975, and the last four (162.425, 162.450, 162.500 & 162.525 MHz) in 1981.

163.275 MHz was used by KHB47 in New London, Connecticut initially in 1969 until switching to 162.400 in 1970 to avoid overlapping with KWO35 in New York, and internally by NWS in case of a power outage, but is no longer in active use. 169.075 MHz was initially used by WWG75 transmitting from Mt. Haleakala on Maui in 1970 before also switching to 162.400 by 1972.

=== Channel designations ===
NOAA Weather Radio and SARMEX all refer to the seven stations by their frequencies (MHz):

162.400	162.425	162.450	162.475	162.500	162.525	162.550

Other channel designations such as WX1 through WX7 "have no special significance but are often designated this way in consumer equipment" and "other channel numbering schemes are also prevalent/possible" according to NOAA and USCG. Ordering channels by when they were established (WX1, WX2, ...) is "becoming less 'popular' over time than a numerical ordering of channels." Weather radios may list stations in the order of their WX#, or by a "Preset Channel" number 1 through 7 in ascending frequency order.

The "WX#" format is continued from WX8 up to WX12 on some lists and radios to include 163.275 MHz and or one or more of the Canadian continuous marine broadcast (CMB) frequencies 161.650, 161.775, 161.750, 162.000. Unlike WX1-WX7 typically ordered by frequency adoption by NWS, there is no consistent frequency inclusion nor assignment for WX8-WX12. Effective January 1, 2019, channels 2027 (161.950 MHz, 27B) and 2028 (162.000 MHz, 28B) are designated as ASM 1 and ASM 2 respectively for application specific messages (ASM) as described in Recommendation ITU-R M.2092.

The "WX" arose from the Morse code prosign shorthand for weather reports (WX) combined with the order number that the seven frequencies were adopted for use nationally. More frequencies helped prevent interference from other nearby transmitters, growing in use in the 1990s in less populated rural areas and as fill-in broadcast translators relaying an existing station or sending a separate, more localized broadcast into remote or mountainous areas, or those areas with reception trouble.

As with conventional broadcast television and radio signals, it may be possible to receive more than one of the seven weather channels at a given location, dependent on factors such as the location, transmitter power, range and designated coverage area of each station. The NWS suggests that users determine which frequency (as opposed to channel) is intended for their specific location so that they are assured of receiving correct and timely information.

=== Present day ===
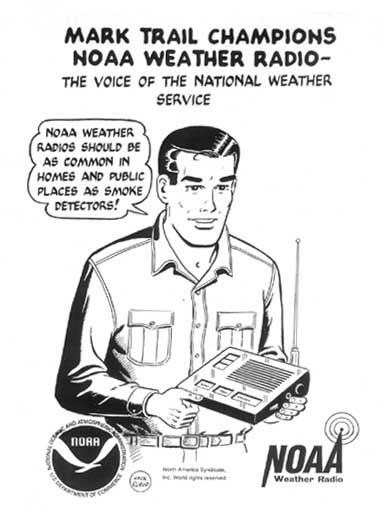
Public service announcement featuring comic strip character Mark Trail promoting NOAA Weather Radio

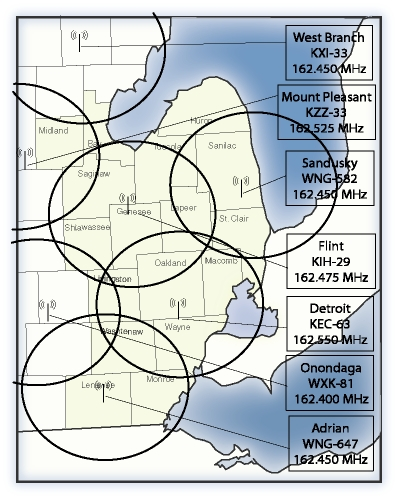
Example NOAA weather radio coverage for eastern Michigan

All seven NWR channels are available on stand-alone weather radio receivers that are sold online and in retail stores (available for prices ranging from US$20 and up), as well as on most marine VHF radio transceivers, amateur radios and digital scanners. In addition, more mainstream consumer electronics, such as clock radios, portable multi-band receivers and two-way radios (such as FRS, GMRS and CB radio), now feature the ability to also receive NWR channels. Many of the aforementioned devices also incorporate automatic alerting capabilities. Many American television stations offer discounted pricing for radios to viewers as a public courtesy (especially in highly tornado-prone areas), where they are often marketed as an essential safety device on par with a smoke alarm for home fires.

=== Coverage ===
According to NOAA, reliable signal reception typically extends in about an 80-mile radius from a full-power (1,000 W) transmitter, depending on level terrain. However, signal blockages can occur, especially in mountainous areas. As of 2016, there are over a thousand NWR transmitters across the U.S., covering 95% of the population. Because each transmitter can cover several counties, typically a person will program their weather radio to receive only the alerts for their county or nearby surrounding counties where weather systems are most likely to move in from.

== Alerting ==
Audio from NOAA Weather Radio and the Forest Service Sawtooth Avalanche Center broadcasting of a Backcountry Avalanche Warning issued for Elmore, Boise, and Valley, Idaho on January 11, 2024. Weather Radio stations will carry alerts when dangerous weather threatens a location within their listening area.

Whenever a weather or civil emergency alert is issued for any part of a NWR station's coverage area, many radios with an alert feature will sound an alarm or turn on upon detection of a 1,050 Hz attention tone that sounds just before the voice portion of an alert message. The specification calls for the NWS transmitter to sound the alert tone for ten seconds and for the receiver to react to it within five seconds. This system simply triggers the alarm or turns on the radio of every muted receiver within reception range of that NWR station (in other words, any receiver located anywhere within the transmitter's broadcast area). Generally, receivers with this functionality are either older or basic models.

Many newer or more sophisticated alerting receivers can detect, decode and react to a digital signal called Specific Area Message Encoding (SAME), which allows users to program their radios to receive alerts only for specific geographical areas of interest and concern, rather than for an entire broadcast area. These advanced models may also have colored LED status lights which indicate the level of the alert as an "advisory"/"statement", "watch" or "warning" (either amber or green for advisories, statements, and tests; orange or yellow for watches; red for warnings).

When an alert is transmitted, the SAME header/data signal is broadcast first (heard as three repeated audio "bursts"), followed by the 1,050 Hz attention tone, then the voice message, then the end-of-message (EOM) data signal (repeated quickly three times). This encoding/decoding technology has the advantage of avoiding "false alarms" triggered by the 1,050 Hz tone itself in locations outside the intended warning area. Broadcast areas are generally divided into SAME locations by county or marine zone using the standard U.S. Government FIPS county codes.

NOAA's SAME alert protocol was later adopted and put into use by the Emergency Alert System (EAS) in 1997 – the replacement for the earlier Emergency Broadcast System (EBS) and even earlier CONELRAD – now required by the FCC for standard broadcast TV and radio stations. Environment Canada eventually integrated SAME alerting capability into its Weatheradio Canada network in 2004. Organizations are able to disseminate and coordinate emergency alerts and warning messages through NOAA Weather Radio and other public systems by means of the Integrated Public Alert and Warning System.

In September 2008, Walgreens announced that it would utilize SAME technology to deliver local weather alerts via a system of LED billboards located outside its drugstore locations to provide an additional avenue of weather information. Many national billboard companies (such as Outfront Media, Clear Channel Outdoor and Lamar, among others) also use their color LED billboard networks to display weather warnings to drivers, while state-owned freeway notification boards, which utilize the EAS/NOAA infrastructure for Amber alerts, also display weather warnings.

== Emergency alert test procedure ==
Modern-day NOAA Weather Radio WXM99 Required Weekly Test voiced by current Paul
The required weekly test issued by the National Weather Service in Grand Forks, ND on May 17, 2023 at 10:00 AM. This alert is conducted every Wednesday between 10 AM and noon.

NOAA Weather Radio MKE-KEC60 Required Weekly Test voiced by former "Perfect Paul"
The weekly alert system test, usually conducted between 10:00 a.m. and noon local time every Wednesday, as heard on Milwaukee's KEC60 on November 24, 2010.

Every local National Weather Service weather forecast office is required to conduct a scheduled weekly test of the NOAA Weather Radio public alert system, generally occurring every Wednesday between 10:00 a.m. and 12:00 p.m. (noon). Certain Weather Forecast Offices conduct this twice a week, usually testing two time on Wednesday, usually between 10:00 a.m. and 12:00 p.m. (noon) and then again between 6:00 p.m. and 8:00 p.m. Other offices test once on Wednesday, and then again on Saturday. Some NOAA Weather Radio stations also broadcast tests of the Emergency Alert System on predetermined days and times.

If there is a threat of severe weather that day in a NWR station's listening area, the weekly test is postponed until the next available fair-weather day (sometimes, a short message stating the reason for the test's cancellation is broadcast). The required weekly test (SAME event code "RWT") interrupts regular NWR programming — during the test, a SAME data header is sent, followed by a 1050 Hz attention tone, the voice test message, then a SAME end-of-message (EOM) signal. The text of the test message used by most NWS offices, with variations depending on the office, is typically as follows:

"This is the National Weather Service office in [city]. The preceding signal was a test of the NOAA Weather Radio warning alarm system on station [call sign of radio station] in [location]. During potential or actual dangerous weather situations, specially built receivers are automatically activated by this signal to warn of the impending hazard. Tests of this signal and receivers' performance are usually conducted by this National Weather Service office on Wednesdays at [time of day]. When there is a threat of severe weather, or existing severe weather is in the area on Wednesday, the test will be postponed until the next available good-weather day. Reception of this broadcast, and especially the warning alarm signal, will vary at any given location. The variability, normally more noticeable at greater distances from the transmitter, will occur even though you are using a good quality receiver in perfect working order. To provide the most consistent warning service possible, the warning alarm will be activated only for selected watches and warnings affecting the following counties: [list of counties]. This concludes the test of the warning alarm system on NOAA Weather Radio station [call sign]. We now return to normal programming."

Or, for other offices which test on Wednesday:

"This is the National Weather Service forecast office in [City, State]. The preceding signal was a test of the public warning alarm system for NOAA All Hazards Radio Station [NWR Transmitter Callsign]. During potentially dangerous weather situations, specially built receivers can be automatically activated by this signal to warn of the impending hazard. Tests of this signal and receivers' performance are normally conducted each Wednesday between the hours of 11 AM and 1 PM. If there is a threat of severe weather, the test will be postponed until the next available good-weather day. Reception of this broadcast, and especially the warning alarm, will vary at any given location. The variability, normally noticeable at greater distances from the transmitter, can occur even though you are using a good quality receiver in good working order. To provide the most consistent and dependable warning service possible, the warning alarm will be activated for watches and warnings affecting the following counties: [list of counties]. This concludes the test of NOAA Weather Radio station [NWR Transmitter Callsign]. We now return to the normal broadcast."

== Voices ==
From the introduction of NOAA Weather Radio until the late 1990s, nearly all the voices heard in the broadcasts were those of the staff at local National Weather Service (NWS) offices. The messages were manually recorded, first on tape cartridges and later digitally, and then placed in the broadcast cycle. As the NWS added more transmitters to provide broader radio coverage, the staff had difficulty keeping broadcast cycles updated in a timely fashion, especially during major severe weather outbreaks.

=== System upgrades ===
==== 1990s Console Replacement System ====
To manage the increasing number of transmitters for each office and to speed the overall delivery of warning messages to the public, the Console Replacement System (CRS) was deployed at NWS weather forecast offices in 1997. CRS introduced a computerized voice nicknamed "Paul", using a text-to-speech system which was based on the DECtalk technology. This system was chosen over more readily available concatenative synthesis because each forecast, watch and warning requires unique wording to relay the most accurate and relevant information. Concatenation is typically used by telephone companies, banks and other service businesses where a limited vocabulary of recorded words can easily take the place of specific, repetitive phrases and sentences. NOAA Weather Radio broadcasts contain a wide variety of information which changes with the weather. Forecasters need to have many words to choose from when writing their forecasts and warnings for the public. Although CRS greatly enhanced the delivery speed and scheduling of Weather Radio messages, some listeners disliked Paul's voice, as it was very monotone and did not resemble a normal speaking voice due to CRS not having the technological advances at the time to resemble human speech patterns.

Voice	Type of weather message	File size
CRS Paul	Weather Synopsis	191 KB

==== 2002 Voice Improvement Program ====
In 2002, the National Weather Service contracted with Siemens Information and Communication and SpeechWorks to introduce improved, more natural voices. The Voice Improvement Plan (VIP) was implemented, involving a separate computer processor linked into CRS that fed digitized sound files to the broadcast suite. The improvements involved one male voice ("Craig") and one female voice ("Donna"). Additional upgrades in 2003 improved "Donna" and introduced an improved male voice nicknamed "Tom", which had variable intonation based on the urgency of the report. As part of this upgrade, a Spanish voice, "Javier", was added at a few sites. Due to the superior quality of the "Tom" voice, most NWS offices used it for the majority of broadcasts and announcements.

Voice	Type of weather message	File size
VIP Tom	Coastal Waters Forecast	481 KB
VIP Tom	Local Forecast	498 KB
VIP Tom	Weather Synopsis	125 KB
VIP Donna	Great Lakes Marine Forecast	220 KB
VIP Donna	Hazardous Weather Outlook	127 KB
VIP Donna	Hourly Weather Observation	268 KB
VIP Javier	Climate Summary	112 KB
VIP Javier	Hourly Weather Observation	292 KB
VIP Javier	Local Forecast	285 KB

==== Broadcast Message Handler ====
In 2016, the NWS replaced almost all of the CRS systems in operation at its Weather Forecast Offices—which had been in use for over 20 years and were approaching the end of the system's expected service life—with the Broadcast Message Handler (BMH). The new system is more closely integrated with the AWIPS software and intended to be more reliable. The BMH units replaced "Donna" and "Tom" with an improved "Paul" voice (its classification from new voice partner NeoSpeech). Many stations have dubbed him "Paul II" or "Paul Jr" to avoid confusion with CRS "Perfect Paul". For the NWS offices that incorporate Spanish programming into the NWR broadcast cycle, VIP "Javier" was replaced with a much improved female voice named "Violetta" (another voice from NeoSpeech). The upgrade initially began at six offices: Greenville-Spartanburg, South Carolina; Brownsville, Texas; Omaha, Nebraska; Portland, Oregon; Anchorage, Alaska; and Tiyan, Guam. Many of the stations saw an initial negative reaction primarily due to many mispronunciations. Most local NWS Offices provide a method of reporting these problems, and have the ability to reprogram the voices accordingly.

Voice	Type of weather message	File size
BMH Paul	Local Forecast	280 KB
BMH Violetta	Marine Forecast	1,196 KB

=== Human voices ===
Human voices are still heard on occasion, but sparingly, mainly during station identifications, public forecasts, National Marine Fisheries Service messages, public information statements, public service announcements, required weekly tests, and severe weather events. The capability exists for a meteorologist to broadcast live on any transmitter if computer problems occur or added emphasis is desired, or to notify listeners who are concerned about a silent station on another frequency whether that station is dark due to technical errors, prolonged power outage, or a weather event has forced it off the air.

=== Broadcasting in Spanish ===
Some weather forecast offices will issue a secondary report in Spanish during severe weather events or warnings. Few NWR stations broadcast weather information in Spanish. Four offices use dedicated stations which broadcast in the Spanish language, separate from their corresponding English-language channels: San Diego (WNG712 in Coachella/Riverside), El Paso (WNG652), Miami (WZ2531 in Hialeah, since 2012), and Brownsville (WZ2541 in Pharr and WZ2542 in Harlingen, since 2014). These stations originally used a synthesized Spanish male voice named "Javier" for all broadcasts, but have since been upgraded with the BMH female voice "Violetta". The Albuquerque WFO often repeats weather alerts in Spanish after their initial dissemination in English. Station WXJ69 in San Juan, Puerto Rico broadcasts all information, including forecasts, in the same manner.

== Live streaming ==
Several websites provide internet audio streaming of a subset of the NOAA Weather radio stations. The most prominent of these, the Wunderadio section of weather information website Weather Underground, discontinued live streams of NWR broadcasts in April 2017. As the Wunderadio internet streaming service dissolved, many other sources developed, allowing previous users of the service to continue monitoring live streams from Wunderadio, as well as newer broadcasts from different locations.

== See also ==
- NAVTEX
- Severe weather terminology (United States)
- Weather radio
- Weatheradio Canada
