= Midland Radio =

American manufacturing company

Midland Radio Corporation
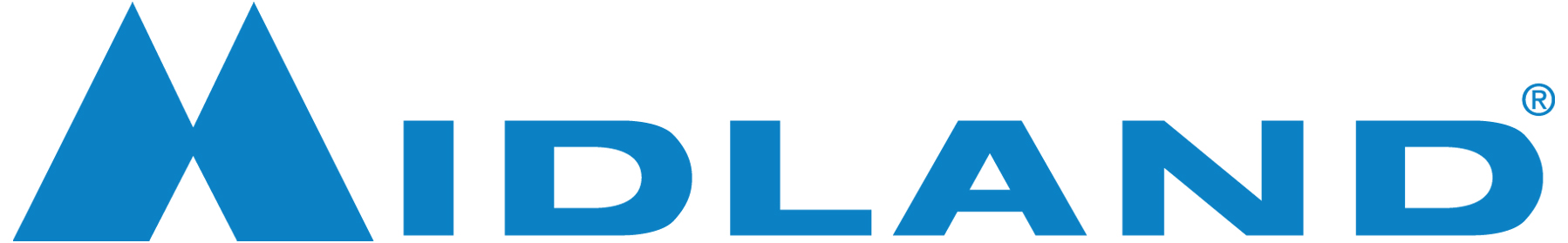
- Founded: 1959; 67 years ago in Kansas City, USA
- Products: Two-way Radio, Citizens band radio
- Website: www.midlandusa.com www.midlandeurope.com

Midland Radio Corporation, also known as Midland Radio, or just Midland, is a manufacturing company, headquartered in Kansas City, Missouri, US. Midland Radio develops radio communications products.

== History and structure ==
Midland Radio Corporation was established in 1959 in Kansas City, Missouri. Midland Radio Corporation is owned by private investors. Midland is the oldest U.S. manufacturer of CB radios. In the 1990s, CTE International acquired a significant share of Midland Radio Corporation.

Midland Radio is the U.S. affiliate of an international group of companies with offices in Bulgaria, Germany, Hong Kong, Italy, Poland, Russia, Spain, Ukraine, and the United Kingdom. MRC is headquartered in a distribution facility in Kansas City, Missouri, which houses its entire U.S. operations.

== Products ==
Midland Radio develops, manufactures, and imports both consumer and business radio communications products. They were the first to introduce a 14-channel FRS radio to the market. Here is an overview of their product categories:

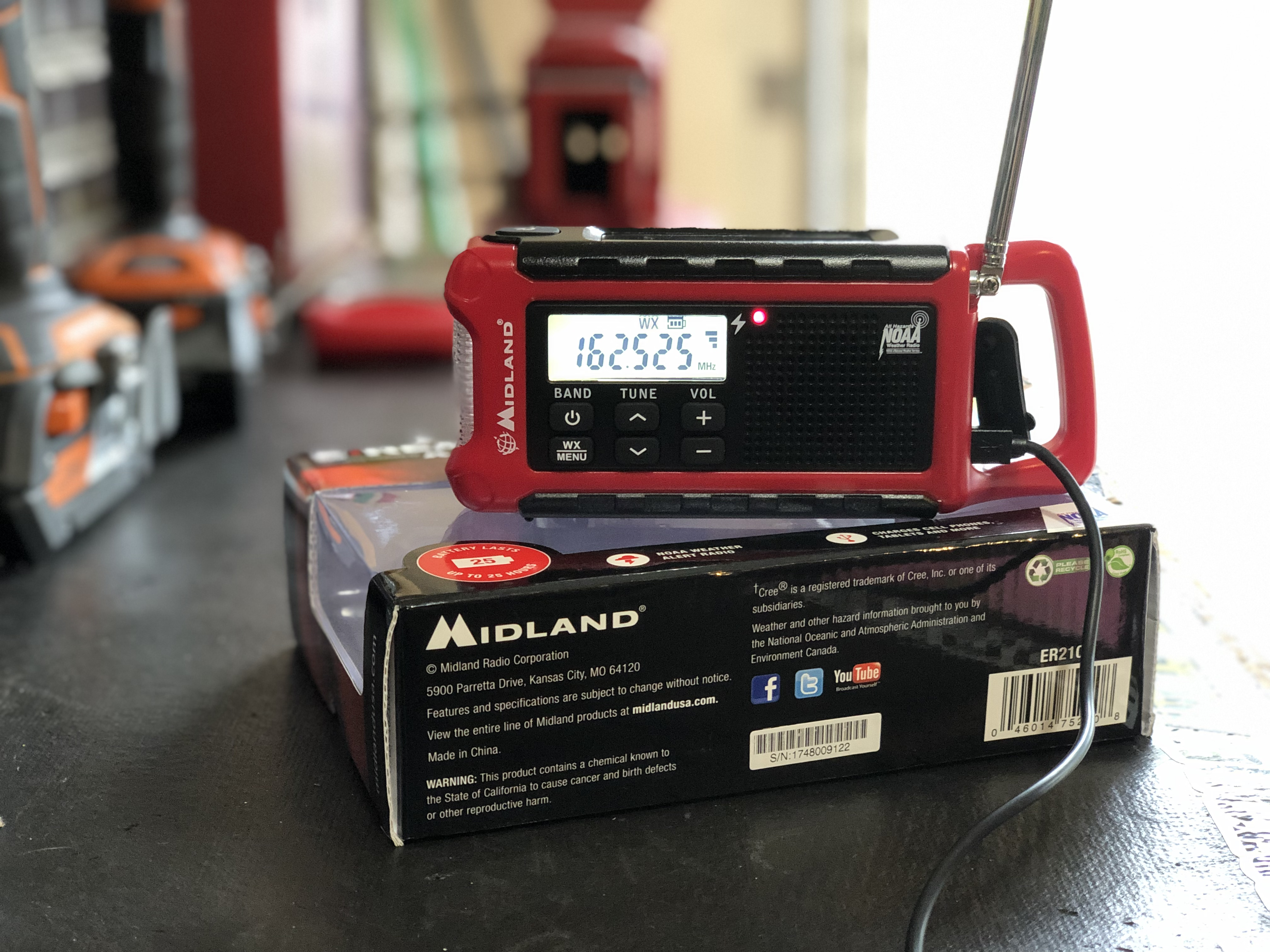
Midland Radio's ER210 from the Emergency Preparedness Line.

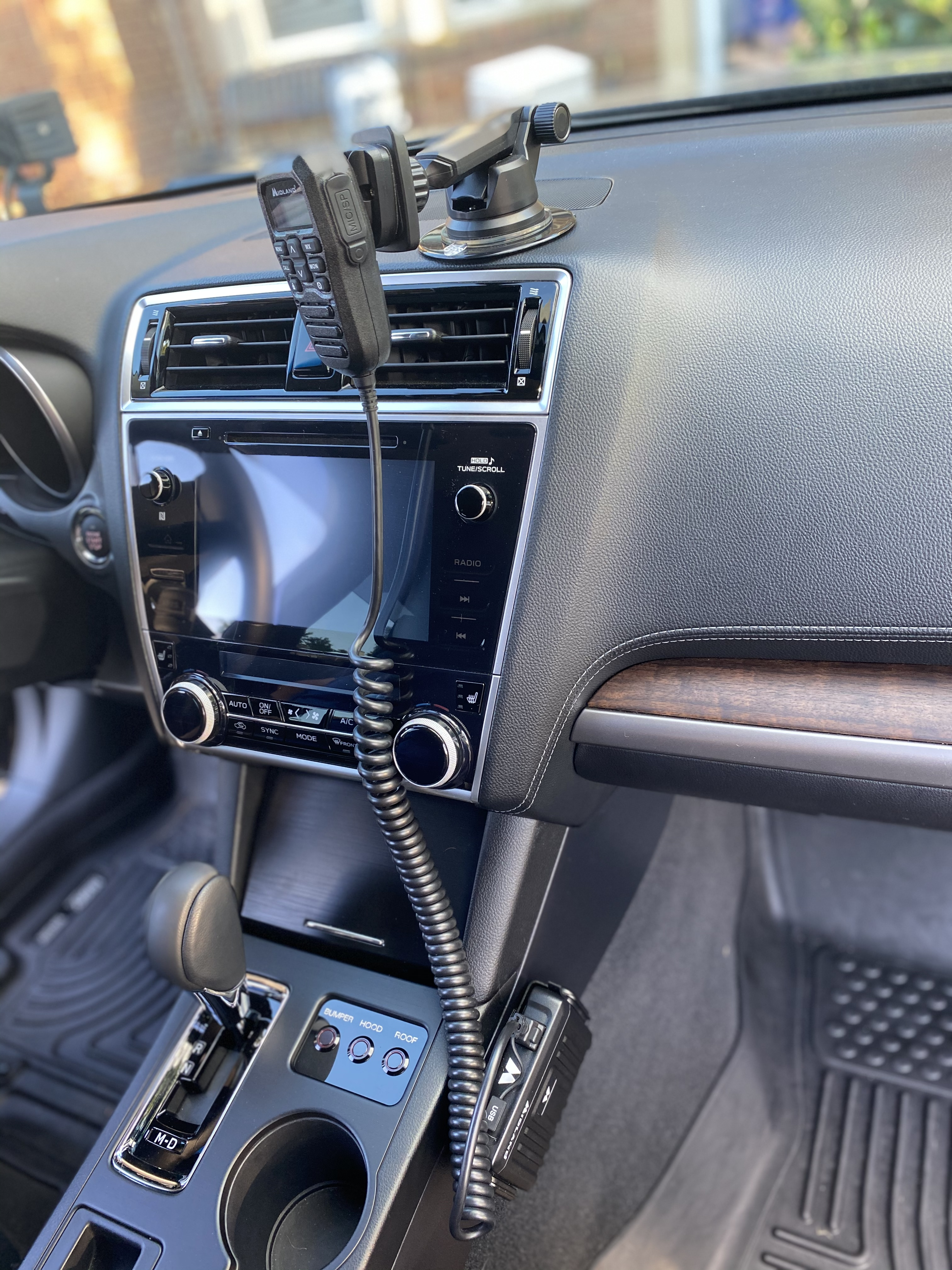
Midland Radio's MXT275 from the MicroMobile Line.

NOAA Weather Radios:

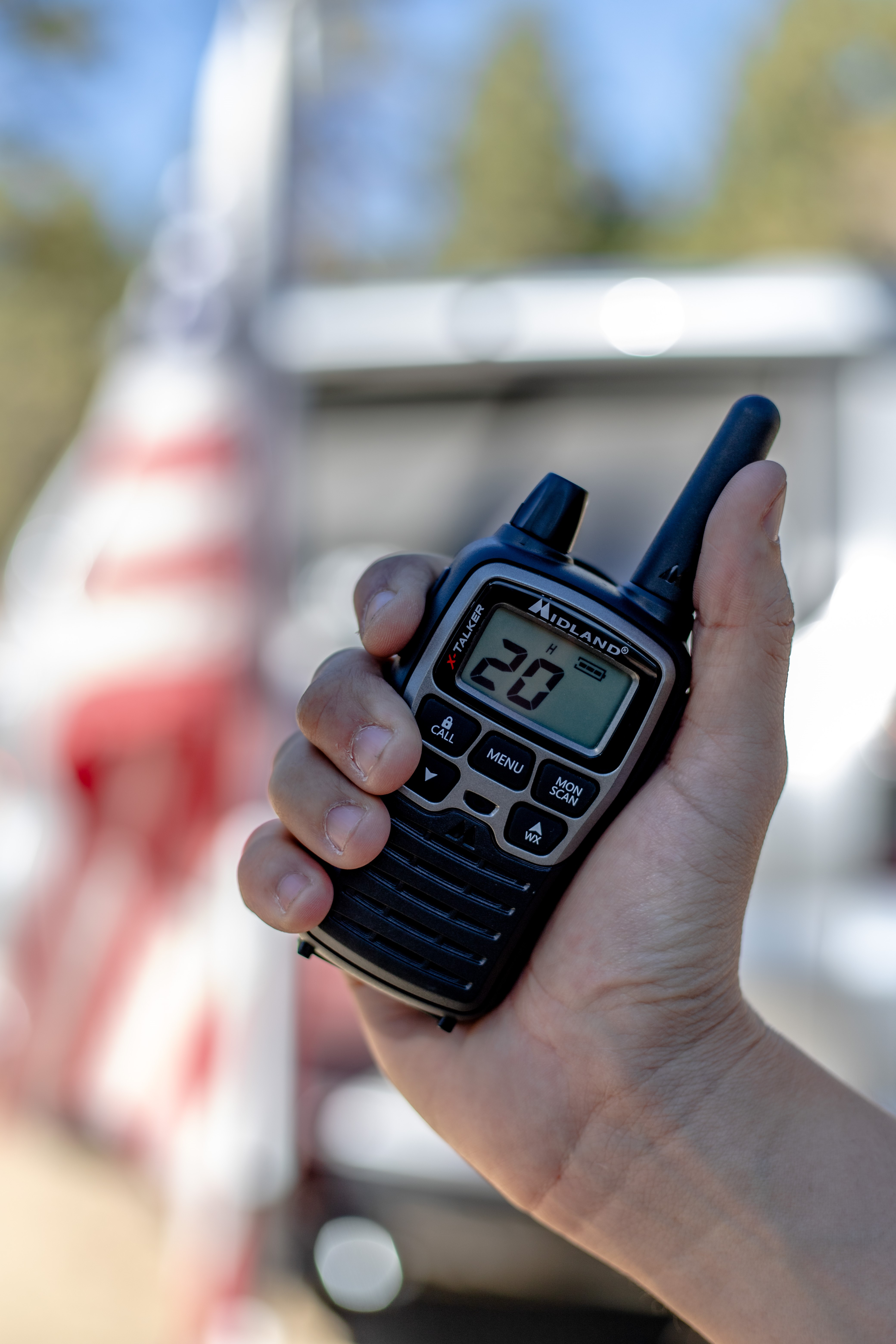
- Midland Radio's T71VP3 from the Two-Way Radio Line.
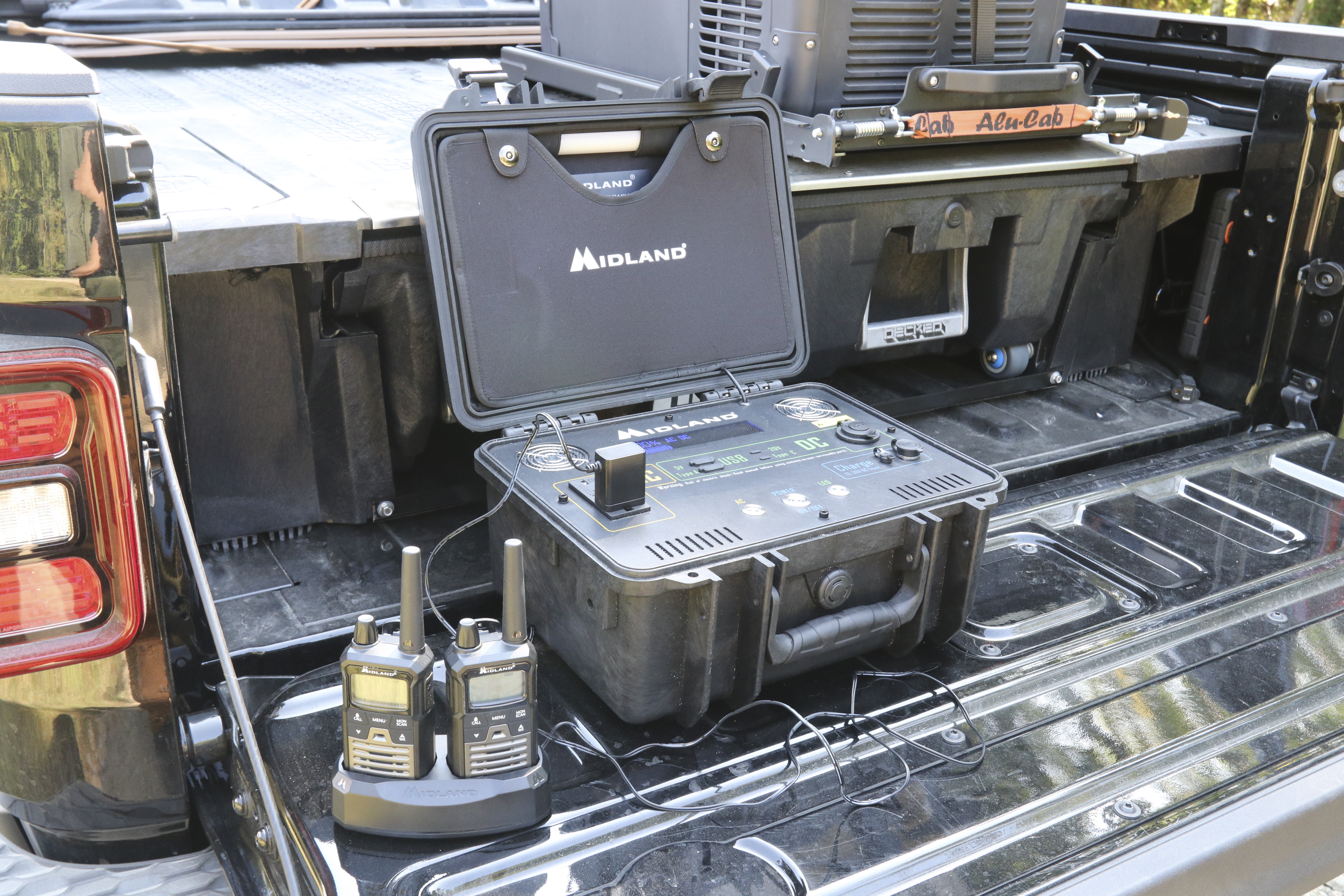
  Midland Radio's PPG1000 from the Portable Power Line.
  NOAA stands for the National Oceanographic and Atmospheric Administration. This federal agency is responsible for the majority of weather forecasts and forewarning about weather events.
- Midland Radio has four different NOAA Weather Radios: The WR120, WR300, WR400 and the HH50B.

Emergency Alert Radios:

- This line of products alert consumers when there is a public or weather related emergency.
- The two main Emergency Alert products are the ER210 and ER310. Both are equipped with hand cranks and solar for a sustainable, back up power source.
- Multiple power source options - USB, LED flashlight, Hand Crank and rechargeable batteries.

Two-Way Radios

- Midland Radio offers four lines of two-way radios: X-Talker, LXT, GXT and XT511.

MicroMobile

- High-Powered GMRS Radios that can communicate with any Midland Radio Two-Way Radio.
- Midland Radio is the official communication sponsor of Jeep Jamboree, which now is in a transition to switch from CB to MicroMobile Radios.

CB Radios

- Midland offers classic and portable CB Radios.

Business Radios

- Midland Radio has three product lines within their business sector - Heavy Duty, Medium Duty and Light Duty.

Portable Power

- The PPG1000 runs on a silent 924 Wh lithium-ion battery, which makes it a clean source of power and safe to use indoors as well as outdoors.
- Run a coffee maker, blender, mini fridge and so on, with the PPG1000.

Amateur Radios (Europe Only)

- Midland Radio offers a Dual Band Amateur Two-Way Radio featuring UHF and VHF bands and NOAA weather channels.

== CTE International ==
Midland Radio, and the Midland trademark is represented in Europe by CTE International. CTE International acquired a "significant share" of Midland Radio Corporation in the 1990s.
