= Telecommunications in Bermuda =

Bermuda has three main television stations, a small cable microwave system, three public GSM services (Digicel, One Communications, Paradise Mobile), multiple submarine cables (CB-1, Gemini Bermuda, GlobeNet, CBUS), and two main Internet service providers (Digicel, One Communications).

== Telephone ==
Country Code: +1 441
International Call Prefix: 011 (outside the North American Numbering Plan (NANP))

Calls from Bermuda to the US, Canada, and other NANP nations are dialed as 1 + NANP area code + 7-digit number. Calls from Bermuda to non-NANP countries are dialed as 011 + country code + phone number with local area code.

Number Format: nxx-xxxx

- Telephones - main lines in use: 57,700 (2006)
- Telephones - mobile cellular: 60,100 (2006)
- Telephone system:
  - general assessment: good
  - domestic: fully automatic telephone system; fiber optic trunk lines
  - international: country code - 1 (441); landing point for the Atlantica-1 telecommunications submarine cable that extends from the US to Brazil; satellite earth stations - 3 (2007)

== Radio ==
- Radio broadcast stations: AM 0, FM 7, shortwave 1 (2021)

There are three main broadcasting companies in Bermuda: LTT Broadcasting Co. Ltd. (Irie), The Bermuda Broadcasting Company Ltd. (ZFB/ZBM) (not to be confused with the British Broadcasting Corporation), and Inter-Island Communications Ltd. (Hott/Magic).

The BBC owns four with the call signs of 2 with ZFB and two with the call signs ZBM. One of BBC's popular stations include Power 95 (94.9). It plays mostly hip hop, R&B, and reggae. It has been popular over the years, until competition from Hott 107.5 began.

The recent change of LTT Broadcasting's Jazz format and frequency from 98.1 to 98.3 in November 2010 to Roots and Classic Reggae (www.irie.bm) has shifted audience from Power 94.9 and Hott 107.5 to place overall second in the market in the broad 18-54 demographic based on research from Research Innovations Ltd in February 2011.

In April 2004 2 FM licenses were assigned to each Inter-Island Communications and LTT Broadcasting Co. Ltd. Inter-Island Communications operates Hott 107.5 FM, which plays a mixture of R&B, hip hop, reggae and some gospel. Overnight Hott 107.5 FM became the number one radio station in Bermuda. The Programme Director and part owner for the station was Elroy RC Smith, formerly of WGCI-FM of Chicago, Illinois, who is widely respected as one of the top PD in America. He has since departed from the station. Inter-Island Communications Ltd. launched its Adult Contemporary station, Magic 102.7 FM in February 2007. Reggae star Collie Buddz (real name: Collin Harper) & his brother Matthew Harper started "Vibe 103" on March 30, 2012, under the corporate name of Harper Digital.

The Government of Bermuda's Maritime Operations Centre has also set up a shortwave radio station in 2007 (call-sign: ZBR),

The Government of Bermuda also operates a radio station at 100.1 FM to broadcast emergency information, such as hurricane watches and warnings.

The Government of Bermuda also operates a DGPS beacon for Maritime Operations on 323 kHz

American satellite radio is also available.

Organised by frequency, the stations are listed below:

- 89.1 FM ZBM-FM "Ocean 89" / Bermuda Broadcasting
- 94.9 FM ZFB-FM "Power 95" / Bermuda Broadcasting
- 98.3 FM VRBF-FM / LTT
- 100.1 FM ZBB-FM Government of Bermuda
- 102.7 FM ZFM-FM WMJ-FM / Inter-Island
- 103.3 FM ZFV-FM Vibe 103 / Harper Digital
- 107.5 FM ZFH-FM WHT-FM / Inter-Island
- 162.4 and 162.55 ZBR Bermuda Maritime Operations Centre

Defunct:

- 960 AM ZFB
- 1230 ZBM-1
- 1340 ZBM-2
- 1160 AM VSB-3
- 1280 AM VSB-2
- 1450 AM VSB-1
- 106.1 FM VSB-FM

== Television ==
- Television broadcast stations: 2 (2014) ZFB Channel 7, ZBM Channel 9

Since 2014, the Bermuda Broadcasting Company (BBC, not to be confused with the BBC in the mainland UK) is the sole company operating television stations on Bermuda. It operates ZBM-TV channel 9, a CBS affiliate, and ZFB-TV channel 7, an ABC affiliate. Until 2014, there was a third station on the island, VSB-TV channel 11, an NBC affiliate, owned by the locally based DeFontes Group. All of these television stations are commercial - there is no equivalent to the US's PBS, and the UK's BBC in Bermuda. Another TV station, Fresh Creations, is a community TV station. Another channel, called Look TV, is primarily a rolling calendar of events. There is also a Government information service channel, which highlights history and current event programmes produced by the Government's information department.

All five TV channels are transmitted over the air, however most residents use cable for reception.

In recent years, there had been talk in the Bermudian government of creating its own TV station, saying that it is needed "to speak directly to the public 'in an unmediated and unedited fashion'", while critics state that it will be no more than a propaganda exercise.

Satellite television is also used, but was unreliable when the only satellites available are those mainly servicing the United States of America, Canada, Latin America and placed on the edge of the reception area. In 2013, Bermuda started their own telecommunication industry when it obtained the Bermudasat 1 (former private American EchoStar VI) satellite that was moved to Bermuda's owned geostationary point at 96.2° West.

Digital TV cable is available, as is wireless.

== Internet ==
- Internet service providers (ISPs): 4 (2002)
- Internet hosts: 1,628 (2008)
- Internet users: 48,000 (2007)
- Country codes: .bm

The .bm code is controlled by the Bermuda Government's Department of Intellectual Property, a part of the Registry General and administered by CSSD, the government's IT support group. The .bm domains are primarily granted to Licensed Businesses. Private accounts do exist, however.
