= Severe thunderstorm watch =

Public advice of risk of severe storms

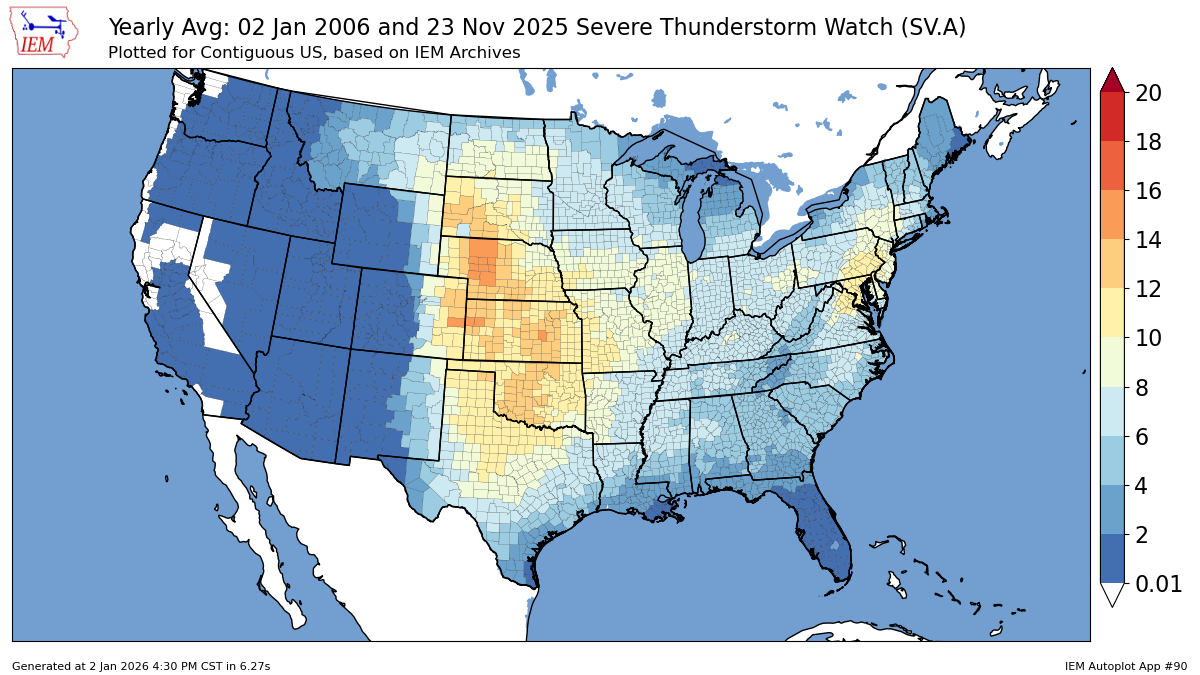
Map of average annual severe thunderstorm watches in the United States between 2006 and 2025.

A severe thunderstorm watch (SAME code: SVA) is a statement issued by weather forecasting agencies to advise the public that atmospheric conditions in a given region may lead to the development of severe thunderstorms within (or near) the region over a period of several hours. The criteria for issuing a watch varies by country, and may also include torrential rainfall and tornadoes. A watch may also be issued several hours ahead of the arrival of a mature and organized complex of storms (such as a mesoscale convective system), or more clustered or discrete storm activity (of the single-cell, multicell and/or supercell varieties).

A severe thunderstorm watch, like a tornado watch, is not to be confused with a warning. A watch encourages the public to remain vigilant, to be on the watch, for the later onset of severe weather. An area under a watch may even experience deceptively fair weather with few clouds before thunderstorms develop.

== Definition ==
A severe thunderstorm watch indicates that atmospheric conditions observed in and close to the watch area have created a significant risk for the development and intensification of convective thunderstorms that could exceed regional severe criterion, and are normally issued in advance of the onset of severe weather. (The criteria for thunderstorms to be classified as severe varies by country; e.g., in the United States, severe thunderstorms must produce winds exceeding 58 mph [93 km/h], and/or hailstones larger than one inch [2.5 cm] in diameter, and/or one or more tornadoes.) Generally (but not always), thunderstorms that develop within the watch area may contain large hailstones, intense straight-line winds, intense lightning, torrential rainfall and/or flash flooding caused by high rainfall accumulations. Depending on storm cell intensity, severe thunderstorms can cause damage to structures or vehicles; impairment of vehicle and pedestrian travel; flooding to streets, populated neighborhoods, farmlands and other areas of poor drainage; and in extreme cases, injury or possible fatality to people and animals exposed outdoors (from either repeated hail-induced blunt trauma, wind-generated debris or intense flooding).

If severe weather actually does occur, a severe thunderstorm warning or tornado warning would then be issued. Residents and travelers in the watch area are advised to immediately undertake safety preparations ahead of the arrival of severe weather. A watch is not required for a thunderstorm- or other hydrological-based weather warning to be issued; severe thunderstorm warnings are often issued when a severe thunderstorm watch is not active (i.e., when a tornado watch is active or, less frequently, if severe convective storms are not expected to be of broad enough coverage to require a watch).

While a severe thunderstorm watch does not nominally imply the probability for tornadoes, if modest wind shear and storm-level helicity is conducive for a marginal tornado threat within the convective environment, storm cells that develop within the proximate severe thunderstorm watch area can occasionally exhibit mesocyclonic rotation at the cloud base and may spawn tornadoes if advanced tornadogenesis occurs. An existing severe thunderstorm watch, or merely a portion of it, can also be upgraded to a tornado watch, if conditions that were originally considered marginally conducive if at all for tornadic development have evolved to permit a greater risk of tornado formation; conversely, a section or the entirety of an existing tornado watch area can be replaced by a severe thunderstorm watch, if conditions are no longer considered conducive for tornadogenesis. Straight-line winds in severe thunderstorms created by strong downdrafts, however, can produce serious structural damage as severe as a lower-category tornado or hurricane over a path comparatively wider than a tornado.

When a severe thunderstorm watch is issued, people within the region of expected severe weather risk are advised to monitor conditions ahead of the developing weather situation; review thunderstorm safety precautions in the event they must seek immediate shelter; and use local broadcast media, weather radio, weather app alert notifications and/or SMS notifications to receive warnings and updated storm information.

== United States ==
In the United States, severe thunderstorm watches are issued by the Storm Prediction Center (SPC), a national guidance center of the National Weather Service (NWS) branch of the National Oceanic and Atmospheric Administration (NOAA), for areas of the lower 48 states where atmospheric conditions favor the development of convective thunderstorm activity reaching severe criteria. Although seldom issued in these states, responsibilities for issuing severe thunderstorm watches covering Alaska and Hawaii are respectively handled by local NWS forecast offices in Fairbanks, Anchorage and Juneau, Alaska, and Honolulu, Hawaii. Watches are typically valid for six to nine hours (extending if necessary as long as 12 hours during unusually steady-state or slow-moving severe weather events) after the time of issuance, and are intended to precede the first report of severe hail or wind by 45 minutes to one hour. SPC watch boxes—termed because the approximate watch area is represented in weather maps as a quadrilateral for aviation purposes—are usually outlined in the approximate delineation of x miles north and south, or east and west, or either side of a line (perpendicular to the center line) from y miles direction of city, state, to z miles another direction of another city, state (e.g., "50 miles either side of a line from 10 miles northeast of Columbia, South Carolina to 15 miles south-southwest of Montgomery, Alabama"). Geographic coverage of severe thunderstorm watches (which ranges from 20,000–40,000 square miles [52,000–104,000 km^{2}] on average, encompassing portions of one or more states) vary based on the size of the land area under threat, the duration of severe weather risk, and the forward motion of the parent storm system and associated surface boundaries.

In situations where atmospheric conditions will support the production of very destructive straight-line winds and hail from the convective activity, the intensified wording "particularly dangerous situation" (PDS) can be added into the watch product. PDS severe thunderstorm watches usually suggest conditions over the approximate area present a widespread threat of destructive hail greater than two inches (5.1 cm) in diameter and winds greater than 75 mph (121 km/h) being generated from the thunderstorm convection, or that downstream conditions favor the development and intensification of a bow echo or derecho moving at 55 mph (89 km/h) or faster. The inclusion of PDS wording (more commonly used for tornado watches in areas where the environment supports the development of strong to violent tornadoes) is rare for severe thunderstorm watches since the tornado threat, in comparison to the much higher threat of extreme wind or hail, must remain low enough to where a standard (non-PDS) tornado watch is not warranted.

SPC meteorologists utilize WarnGen software integrated into the National Centers Advance Weather Interactive Processing System (N-AWIPS) and/or the SPC Product Generator (PRODGEN) to generate the watch statement, which is disseminated through various communication routes accessed by the media and various agencies, on the internet, to NOAA satellites, and over NOAA Weather Radio. The terms "blue box" and "yellow box," often used in parlance within the meteorological community, refer to the coloring assigned to severe thunderstorm watch boxes for hazard maps used by the Storm Prediction Center and the National Weather Service; coloring used by local television outlets to highlight severe thunderstorm watches sometimes vary (in many cases, severe weather alert displays used by many local television stations usually reserve yellow as a highlighter for severe thunderstorm warnings, and blue as a highlighter for severe thunderstorm watches).

The Storm Prediction Center, in conjunction with local NWS Weather Forecast Offices, issues component watch products to communicate the approximate area, primary hazards and other pertinent information about the severe thunderstorm watch to the public, NOAA meteorologists, emergency management and aviation personnel. The graphical and text Public Watch products—in addition to outlining the approximate affected area, valid time, meteorological and aviation discussions, and other pertinent information—includes language specifying the forecast severe weather threat (e.g., "widespread large hail and isolated very large hail events to 3 inches in diameter likely, scattered damaging wind gusts to 70 mph likely, a tornado or two possible") in the primary hazards list. The Watch Probability Table describes probabilities for all modes of severe weather, including probabilities of 10 or more severe wind or hail events and one or more reports of winds exceeding 65 knots (75 mph) or hailstones exceeding two inches (5.1 cm). (Typically, the minimum event probabilities for a severe thunderstorm watch issuance require an ~30% chance of 10 or more wind and hail reports and, for PDS watches, a 70% chance of one or more reports of >65 kt winds and/or >2-inch hail within the watch area over the valid time period.)

The SPC produces two separate products listing all counties or equivalent subdivisions (parishes, independent cities, and coastal marine zones) included in the broader watch area: Watch County Lists (WCL), which are produced internally preceding the watch issuance for collaborative use with local NWS offices to outline counties and equivalent subdivisions being proposed for inclusion in the watch, and Watch Outline Update (WOU) messages, a public list of the determined watch subdivisions published upon the initial severe thunderstorm watch issuance. Local NWS offices concurrently issue Watch County Notification (WCN) messages that list subdivisions within their designated area of responsibility that the office has considered to be in the initial watch; WCN messages—which the SPC uses as the basis for their Watch Outline Update product—are updated to denote changes to the watch by local WFOs, which are provided responsibility for adding or removing counties/subdivisions from the watch, extending its time of expiration, or cancelling the watch entirely if conditions no longer support a severe weather threat (if atmospheric conditions have become less conducive to form severe thunderstorms or were insufficient for severe weather development compared to earlier forecast analysis). The SPC updates Watch Outline Updates at least on an hourly basis to incorporate changes made by the accordant WFOs in their Watch County Notification messages.

The SPC issues Watch Status Messages to designate areas considered to have a continuing severe weather threat, based primarily on the position of surface features (such as cold fronts and drylines)—and the NWS offices decide what counties to remove from the watch (the local offices will almost always follow the SPC recommendation on the status messages). If conditions are no longer favorable for severe convective thunderstorms in the watch area, the severe thunderstorm watch may be cancelled outright; occasionally, a severe thunderstorm watch, if not merely a section of it, may be replaced by a tornado watch should conditions that were originally forecast to be conducive for non-tornadic severe thunderstorms evolve to allow an increased possibility of tornado formation, and likewise may replace a tornado watch if conditions for tornadogenesis are no longer considered favorable. If no convective development or reported severe weather occurs, this leads to a severe thunderstorm watch "bust", which can factor into determinations by the SPC and National Weather Service offices on whether to cancel the watch.

Because the Storm Prediction Center and local National Weather Service WFOs each have roles in the watch issuance process, the subdivisions listed in the Watch Outline Update and Watch County Notification products will sometimes differ from the outlined watch box area, including subdivisions located outside the outlined quadrilateral; however the local Weather Forecast Office is tasked with determining which counties should be included in or, in lieu of a new downstream watch, added to the designated watch area. The WFOs monitoring their sector of the watch area can also consult, via conference call, with the Storm Prediction Center to relay and determine locally dictated changes to the severe thunderstorm watch, regarding replacement of the watch and extensions of time and areal coverage if conditions warrant.

=== Examples ===
Severe Thunderstorm Watch for Western Arkansas and Eastern Oklahoma
An example of a severe thunderstorm watch issued for Western Arkansas and Eastern Oklahoma counties on September 23, 2023 at 10:10 PM CST.

This is an example of a PDS severe thunderstorm watch issued for parts of Kansas, Oklahoma, and Texas.

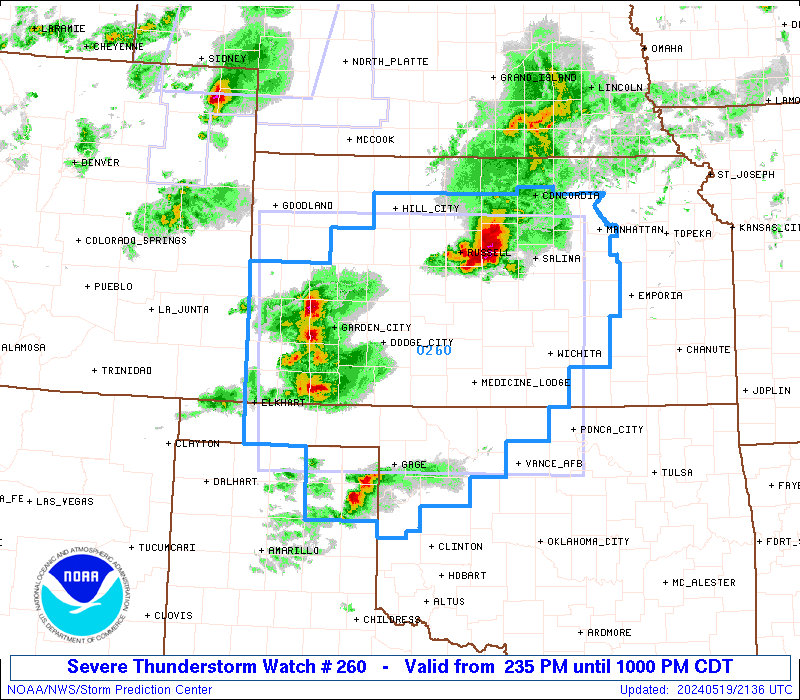

Hazard	Tornadoes	EF2+ Tornadoes	Severe Wind	65 kt+ Wind	Severe Hail	2"+ Hail
Likelihood	Moderate	Low	High	High	High	High

SEL0
 
URGENT - IMMEDIATE BROADCAST REQUESTED
Severe Thunderstorm Watch Number 260
NWS Storm Prediction Center Norman OK
235 PM CDT Sun May 19 2024

The NWS Storm Prediction Center has issued a

* Severe Thunderstorm Watch for portions of 
  Western and Central Kansas
  Northwestern Oklahoma
  Northeastern Texas Panhandle

* Effective this Sunday afternoon and evening from 235 PM until
  1000 PM CDT.

...THIS IS A PARTICULARLY DANGEROUS SITUATION...

* Primary threats include...
  Widespread damaging winds expected with scattered significant
    gusts to 90 mph likely
  Widespread large hail expected with scattered very large hail
    events to 4 inches in diameter likely
  A few tornadoes possible

SUMMARY...Numerous severe thunderstorms are expected to develop and
track rapidly eastward across the watch area through the afternoon
evening.  Supercells capable of giant hail, damaging winds, and
isolated tornadoes will be the main threat early.  Storms will
organize into multiple fast-moving bowing lines through the evening
with a risk of widespread damaging winds.

The severe thunderstorm watch area is approximately along and 135
statute miles east and west of a line from 55 miles southwest of
Alva OK to 45 miles northwest of Russell KS. For a complete
depiction of the watch see the associated watch outline update
(WOUS64 KWNS WOU0).
PRECAUTIONARY/PREPAREDNESS ACTIONS...
 
REMEMBER...A Severe Thunderstorm Watch means conditions are
favorable for severe thunderstorms in and close to the watch area.
Persons in these areas should be on the lookout for threatening
weather conditions and listen for later statements and possible
warnings. Severe thunderstorms can and occasionally do produce
tornadoes.

&&

OTHER WATCH INFORMATION...CONTINUE...WW 258...WW 259...

AVIATION...A few severe thunderstorms with hail surface and aloft to
4 inches. Extreme turbulence and surface wind gusts to 80 knots. A
few cumulonimbi with maximum tops to 500. Mean storm motion vector
24035.

...Hart

== Canada ==
In Canada, Environment and Climate Change Canada (ECCC) issues severe thunderstorm watches through regional Meteorological Service (MSC) offices based in Vancouver, Edmonton, Winnipeg, Toronto, Montreal and Dartmouth. Unlike the box/subdivision structure of watches issued by the U.S. Storm Prediction Center, severe thunderstorm watches issued by the Meteorological Service are issued strictly for groups of census subdivisions, often covering a total area that is relatively smaller than severe thunderstorm watches in the U.S.). Watches are disseminated to the public through broadcast and online media outlets (including local television stations and The Weather Network/MétéoMédia), and Weatheradio Canada; depending on regional office discretion, the watch may require activation of the National Public Alerting System (Alert Ready) (French: Système national d'alertes à la population [En Alerte]) and feeding provincial alerting systems (such as Alberta Emergency Alert and SaskAlert) to distribute the alert to local broadcast media and cellular phones.

== Philippines ==
In the Philippines, the Philippine Atmospheric, Geophysical and Astronomical Services Administration (PAGASA), through its regional services divisions, issues thunderstorm watches to alert regions and/or provinces of thunderstorm development within a period of twelve hours. Watches are disseminated to the public through terrestrial television and radio stations, and online media outlets.

== See also ==
- Severe weather terminology (United States)
- Particularly Dangerous Situation
