= Severe thunderstorm warning =

Weather warning indicating an observed severe thunderstorm

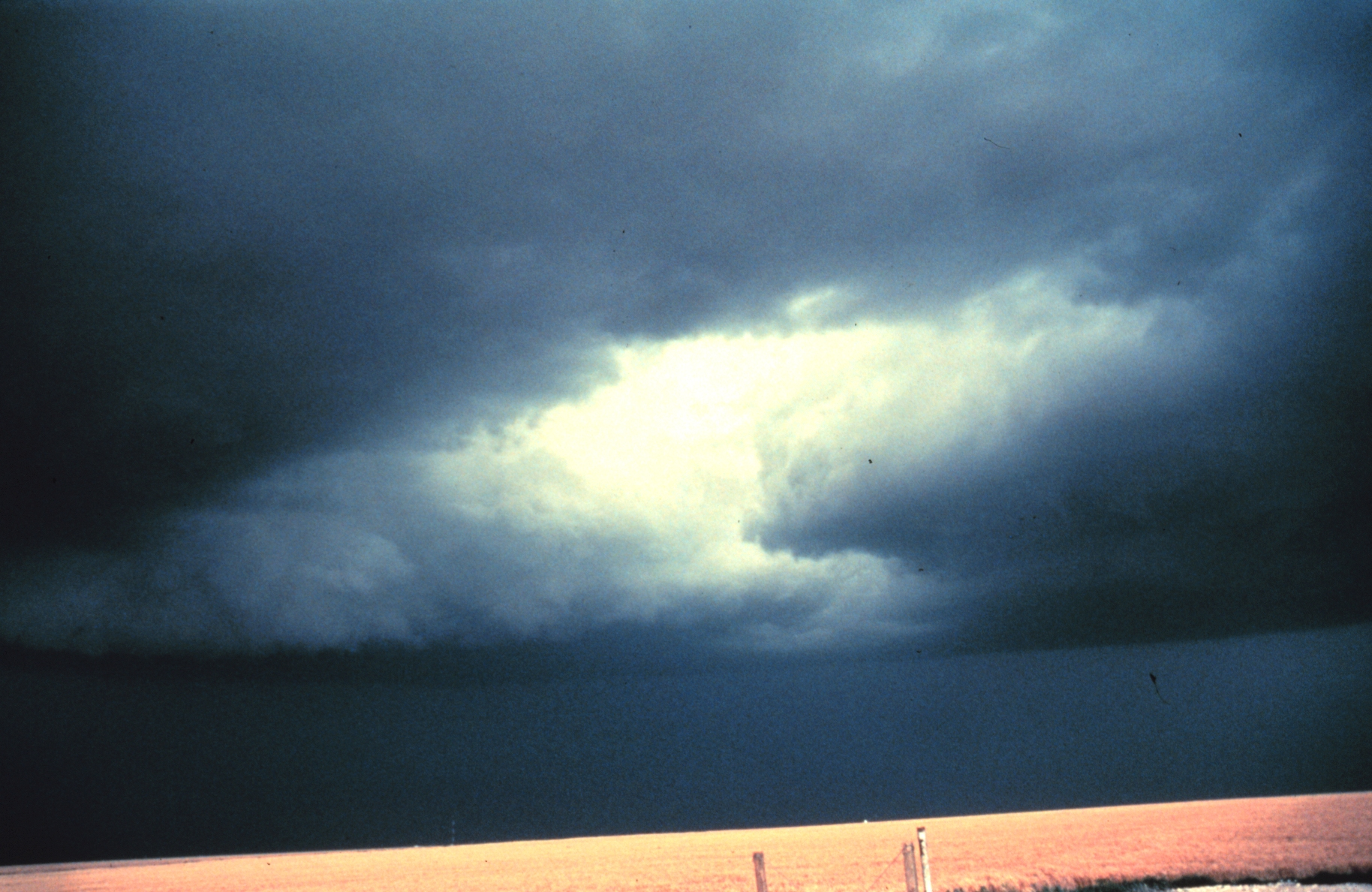
Severe thunderstorm with a clear slot near main updraft core. Typically a tornado, if present, will form in this area.

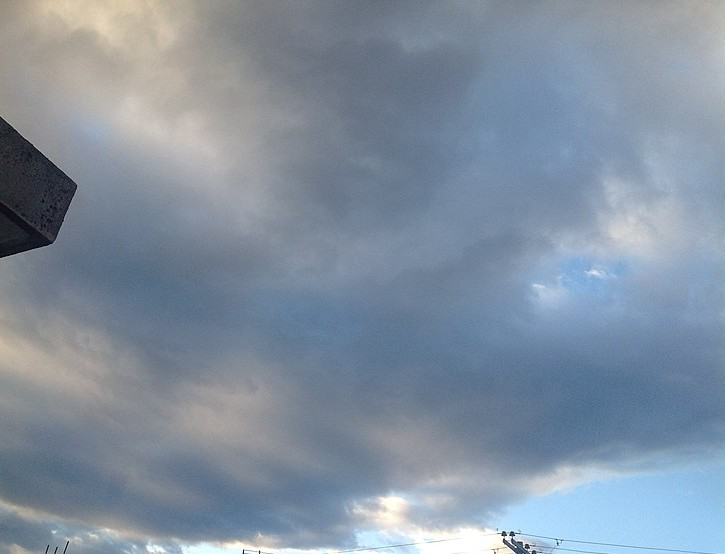
Clouds from a dissipating severe thunderstorm.

A severe thunderstorm warning (SAME code: SVR) is a type of public warning for severe weather that is issued by weather forecasting agencies worldwide when one or more severe thunderstorms have been detected by Doppler weather radar, observed by weather spotters, or reported by an emergency management agency, law enforcement, or the general public. Unlike a watch, a warning is issued to areas in the direct path of active severe thunderstorms, that are expecting a direct impact typically within an hour. Severe thunderstorms can cause property damage and injury due to large hail, high winds, and flooding due to torrential rainfall. The exact criteria to issue a warning varies from country to country.

In the United States, the National Weather Service issues a warning when an observed thunderstorm is producing wind gusts of at least 58 miles per hour (93 km/h), or hail of at least 1 inch (2.5 cm) in diameter. Most forecasting agencies have similar criteria, but some agencies, such as Environment Canada, also include high rainfall rate. Others may instead issue a flood advisory or in the case of the National Weather Service, a flash flood warning.

== Definition ==
A severe thunderstorm warning indicates the warned area is in impending danger from hail or wind speeds meeting warning criteria as well as from lightning and hydrological impacts associated with the storm cell. Severe thunderstorms can and occasionally do produce tornadoes without warning. While not all severe thunderstorms produce tornadoes, they can produce serious straight line wind damage as severe as a lower-category tornado or hurricane, and can actually cover a much wider area than a tornado's comparatively narrow path width.

If a tornado is detected on radar or is sighted visually, a tornado warning will be issued either in replacement of or concurrently to the existing severe thunderstorm warning. Generally, but not always, a severe thunderstorm watch or tornado watch (or a regional equivalent thereof) will precede a warning. If a tornado warning is issued, based on Doppler weather radar, it means strong rotation has been detected within a thunderstorm. Usually, if a thunderstorm is producing only weak rotation, it will only yield hazardous weather warranting a severe thunderstorm warning. However, the public will usually be advised this type of rotation has been detected and that the storm in question should be watched closely in the near future for further intensification.

=== Regional basis and criteria ===
==== United States ====
In the United States, the National Weather Service (NWS) defines a severe thunderstorm as having large hail of one inch (2.5 cm) in diameter or larger, surface wind speeds of 58 mph (50 kn; 93 km/h) or greater, and/or a tornado. Prior to January 2010, the hail size for which a thunderstorm would be considered severe was 0.75 inches (1.9 cm); public complacency due to overly frequent issuances of severe thunderstorm warnings and recent studies stating hail did not produce significant damage on the ground until it reached one inch in diameter caused the upgrade in hail criteria. Severe thunderstorm warnings are issued by the National Weather Service through the agency's local Weather Forecast Offices, which utilize WarnGen software integrated into the Advance Weather Interactive Processing System (AWIPS) to generate the warning statement; it is then disseminated through various communication routes accessed by the media and various agencies, on the internet, to NOAA satellites, over NOAA Weather Radio and, depending on the storm's severity and at the office's discretion, via activation of the Emergency Alert System to local broadcast media and Wireless Emergency Alerts for cellular phones.

Local NWS forecast offices outline warnings for tornadoes and severe thunderstorms in polygonal shapes for map-based weather hazard products distributed to the main agency, individual forecast office websites and the Storm Prediction Center (including open-source APIs available for free use to public weather websites and mobile apps), based on the storm's projected path as determined by Doppler weather radar at the time of the warning's issuance. In NWS text products, warnings are usually illustrated by individual counties, parishes or other county-equivalent jurisdictions (sections or the entirety thereof, and in list format if it covers more than one jurisdiction), particularly dependent on the jurisdiction's total land area. Prior to October 2007, warnings were issued by the National Weather Service on a per-county basis. SPC and NWS products, as well as severe weather alert displays used by some television stations, typically highlight severe thunderstorm warnings with a yellow or orange polygon or filled county/parish/equivalent jurisdiction outline.

The NWS has the option of adding enhanced wording to severe thunderstorm warnings and update statements issued as a Severe Weather Statement (SVS)—"particularly dangerous situation" (PDS), "severe thunderstorm emergency", or, as used by some Central and Southern Region offices as indicative PDS wording, "this is a very dangerous storm"—when an extremely intense severe thunderstorm expected to impact a densely populated area contains very large hailstones and/or intense straight-line winds capable of causing major structural damage (especially to roofs, windows, siding and structures of poor construction such as outbuildings and mobile homes), and severe injury if not death to people and animals exposed outdoors (from either repeated hail-induced blunt trauma or wind-generated debris). Although it is an unofficial alert product, a "severe thunderstorm emergency" statement—an extension of the tornado emergency statements issued to warn of a violent tornado impacting populated areas—is the highest and most urgent level relating to non-tornadic severe thunderstorms. When a threat of tornadic activity exists (especially if a tornado watch is in effect), local NWS forecast offices, particularly those in the Great Plains or Southeastern U.S., will sometimes include a safety precaution action statement indicating "Severe thunderstorms can produce tornadoes with no advance warning..." or similar wording in their severe thunderstorm warnings to advise the public to keep abreast of possible tornado development and any tornado warnings that may be issued.

As part of the agency’s March 2012 implementation of a multi-tier Impact Based Warning (IBW) system to notify the public and emergency management officials of the severity of specific severe weather phenomena, National Weather Service-issued severe thunderstorm warnings and associated Severe Weather Statements providing updated storm information include event tags at the bottom of the product text providing summarical estimates of straight-line wind speeds (sustained or gusts) and hail size and, when applicable, an indication of possible tornadic development. The product text will also provide a summary of impacts to life and property that may be caused by the hailstones and winds being produced by the parent thunderstorm. Initially implemented at six NWS offices in Kansas and Missouri, the categorical threat and damage indicator text—which are applicable to all of the agency’s Weather Forecast Offices, primarily those operating within the agency's Central and Southern Region divisions—were expanded to 33 additional Central Region WFOs in March 2013; eight additional offices operating within the Eastern, Southern and Western Region divisions began using the IBW indicators in March 2014. The entire agency began using the format in 2016. The threat indicators consist of three coded taglines, ascending by observational level:

- Tornado – indicates the mesocyclone of the parent severe thunderstorm is producing circulation at or near the cloud base, which may warrant the issuance of a tornado warning if base-level rotation strengthens. When incorporated into the storm impact summary, the tornado tag (appearing in applicable severe thunderstorm warning products as “TORNADO...POSSIBLE”) will precede the wind and hail tags.
- Hail – indicates the estimated size of hail (measured in inches) being produced by the parent severe thunderstorm (e.g., “HAIL...1.25IN”). When included, the “Impact” section of the warning text will describe potential damage impacts from the hailstones, with the impact message varying in severity depending on radar estimated or observed reports of measured large hail (e.g., “Hail damage to vehicles is expected.”) and the “Hazard” section will provide a comparison of the size of hailstones to objects of similar size (e.g., “baseball size hail” for hailstones measuring 2.75"). (If the tag lists either “HAIL...0.00IN”, indicating no hail is accompanying the storm, or “HAIL...<.75IN”, indicating hailstones below severe criteria that may range in equivalent size from peas [.25"] to pennies [.75"], no hail size will be indicated in the “Hazard” row nor will a description of damage risk be included in the “Impact” section.)
- Wind – indicates estimated speed (in miles per hour) of wind gusts produced by the parent thunderstorm (e.g., “WIND...70MPH”). When included, the “Impact” section of the warning text will describe potential damage impacts from the straight-line winds, varying in severity depending on wind strength (e.g., “Expect considerable tree damage. Wind damage is also likely to mobile homes, roofs, and outbuildings.”).

Since July 28, 2021 (or as late as August 2 in certain County Warning Areas), the NWS has incorporated categorical damage threat indicators for higher-end hail and/or wind events at the bottom of text products for severe thunderstorm warnings (including update statements to existing warnings issued as Severe Weather Statements):

- Considerable – to be used when hail of 1.75 inches (4.4 cm) or larger and/or winds at or above 70 miles per hour (110 km/h) is indicated by radar or observed.
- Destructive – to be used when hail of 2.75 inches (7.0 cm) or larger and/or winds at or above 80 miles per hour (130 km/h) is indicated by radar or observed. (Warnings assigned this indicator incorporate the notation "THIS IS A DESTRUCTIVE STORM FOR[...]"—which superseded the boilerplate "this is a particularly dangerous situation" wording—between the storm summary and hazard information in the product text to indicate certain areas under greatest threat from the specified wind speeds and/or hail size.)

Similar to the indicators used for tornado warnings since the 2013 implementation of its Impact Based Warning system, the categorical criteria—which will be applicable to all NWS Weather Forecast Offices—was introduced to further explain to the public of the dangers of some thunderstorms, especially those that occur in the Great Plains, that can produce massive hailstones of baseball size (2.75 inches [7.0 cm]) or larger that may fall fast enough to severely injure if not kill a person by repeated blunt trauma, and winds that can cause damage equivalent to hurricanes and tornadoes (especially to roofs and weaker structures such as outbuildings and mobile homes). When deemed necessary, initial warnings and Severe Weather Statement updates containing the "destructive" tag will be disseminated into the Wireless Emergency Alerts system as well.

==== Canada ====
In Canada, a severe thunderstorm is defined as having wind gusts of greater than 90 km/h (56 mph), hail with a diameter of greater than two centimetres (0.79 in), rainfall rates of greater than 50 millimetres (2.0 in) in one hour or greater than 75 millimetres (3.0 in) in three hours, or tornadoes. Environment and Climate Change Canada issues severe thunderstorm warnings through regional offices of the Meteorological Service of Canada based in Vancouver, Edmonton, Winnipeg, Toronto, Montreal and Dartmouth for specified municipalities and census subdivisions, sometimes including areas adjacent to a particular warned thunderstorm that are not in the immediate approximate path but may experience severe weather from adjacent thunderstorms during the warning timeframe. Warnings are disseminated to the public through broadcast and online media outlets, and Weatheradio Canada; depending on storm severity and regional office discretion, the warning may require activation of the National Public Alerting System (Alert Ready) (French: Système national d'alertes à la population [En Alerte]) and feeding provincial alerting systems (such as Alberta Emergency Alert and SaskAlert) to distribute the alert to local broadcast media and cellular phones.

==== United Kingdom ====
In United Kingdom, a severe thunderstorm is defined as having hail in excess of two centimetres (0.79 in) and straight-line winds in excess of 89 km/h (48 kn; 55 mph). The Met Office issues de facto severe thunderstorm warnings through general-purpose weather warning products disseminated by the National Severe Weather Warning Service (classified as yellow, amber or red, depending on storm severity and proximity to the time of expected onset of storm impacts).

==== Australia ====
In Australia, a severe thunderstorm is defined as having damaging winds in excess of 90 km/h (49 kn; 56 mph), large hail of two centimetres (0.79 in) or larger, heavy rainfall, and flash flooding. Severe thunderstorm warnings are issued by regional offices of the Bureau of Meteorology (BOM) based in Melbourne Docklands, Adelaide, Darwin, Perth and Brisbane. BOM-issued severe thunderstorm warnings are outlined as either a broad-based warning, covering expected impacts within a weather reporting area, or as a detailed warning, when a thunderstorm is within weather-watch radar range and includes a map depicting any existing thunderstorms and the forecast direction of movement for up to 60 minutes.

==== New Zealand ====
In New Zealand, a severe thunderstorm is defined by the Meteorological Service of New Zealand (MetService) (Māori: Te Ratonga Tirorangi) as having large hail of 20 millimetres (2.0 cm; 0.79 in), damaging winds of 110 km/h (59 kn; 68 mph), rainfall rates of at least 25 millimetres (0.98 in) per hour and/or tornadoes producing winds above 116 km/h (63 kn; 72 mph) (rated F1 or stronger on the Fujita Scale). MetService issues severe thunderstorm warnings to alert regions expected to experience severe weather phenomena meeting regional criteria and utilize the Common Alerting Protocol (CAP) to generate the warning statement. The warning is then disseminated to the public through terrestrial television and radio stations, online media, mobile app and SMS messaging through Emergency Mobile Alert (EMA); if a tornado has been sighted or indicated by radar within the warned area during the severe thunderstorm warning's duration, civil defense sirens, if present, are usually activated within the region to be affected to inform people who are present outdoors of the approaching tornado threat.

==== Philippines ====
In the Philippines, a severe thunderstorm is defined by the Philippine Atmospheric, Geophysical and Astronomical Services Administration (PAGASA) as having strong winds, large hail, torrential rainfall, tornadoes, flash flooding and/or landslides. PAGASA, through its regional services divisions, issue thunderstorm advisories to alert regions and/or provinces expected to experience severe weather phenomena meeting regional criteria within a period of two hours. Warnings are disseminated to the public through terrestrial television and radio outlets, online media, and via SMS messages through the National Disaster Risk Reduction and Management Council's Emergency Cell Broadcast System.

==== Criteria in various countries ====
Country	Tornado	Minimum hail size	Minimum wind speed	Minimum rainfall rate per hour	Source
United States	See Tornado Warning	1 inch (25 mm)	58 miles per hour (93 km/h)	See Flash Flood Warning	
Canada	See Tornado Warning	20 millimetres (0.79 in)	90 kilometres per hour (56 mph)	50 millimetres (2.0 in)	
Australia	All	20 millimetres (0.79 in)	90 kilometres per hour (56 mph)	"Conducive to flash flooding"	
New Zealand	F1 or stronger	20 millimetres (0.79 in)	110 kilometres per hour (68 mph)	25 millimetres (0.98 in)	
Germany	All	15 millimetres (0.59 in)	105 kilometres per hour (65 mph)	20 millimetres (0.79 in)	
Mexico	All	5 millimetres (0.20 in)	89 kilometres per hour (55 mph)	20 millimetres (0.79 in)	
United Kingdom	All	20 millimetres (0.79 in)	55 miles per hour (89 km/h)	"Conducive to flash flooding"	

== See also ==
- Convective storm detection
- Severe thunderstorm watch
- Severe weather
- Severe weather terminology (United States)
- SKYWARN
- Supercell
