= AusAlert =

Planned Australian emergency warning system

- Type: Emergency warning notification system
- Country: Australia
- Launch date: 1 October 2026
- Network: Mobile phones
- Official website: www.ausalert.gov.au
- Replaced: Emergency Alert component of the Standard Emergency Warning Signal

AusAlert warning sound

AusAlert is an Australian cell broadcast emergency population warning system which replaced the old location-targeted, SMS-based Emergency Alert system.

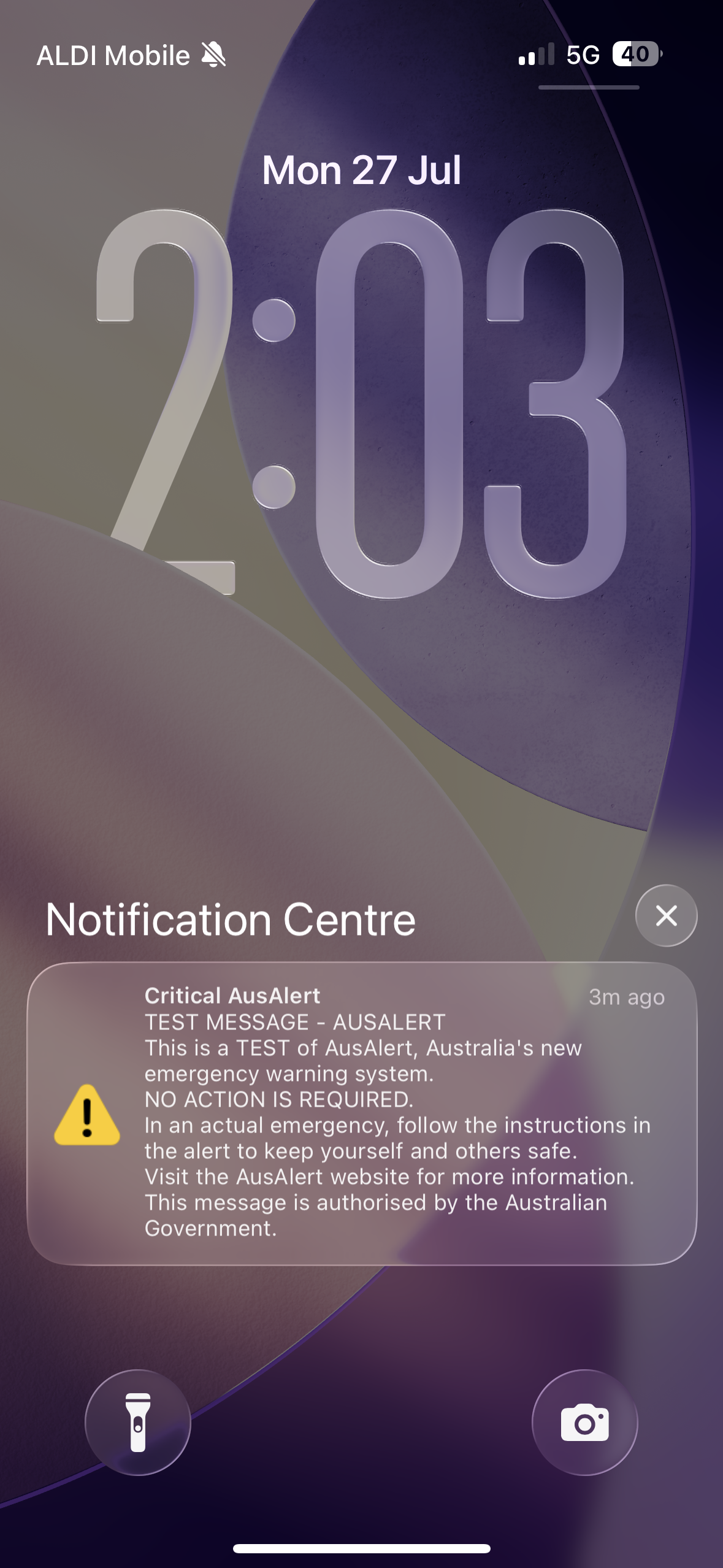
A screenshot of the test alert delivered to an iPhone

The National Emergency Management Agency (NEMA) entered into a contract in February 2025, with the system currently being built. The initial delivery date is expected to be mid to late 2026 for system testing, with a fully operational system expected by mid-late 2027.

== History ==
=== Prior systems ===
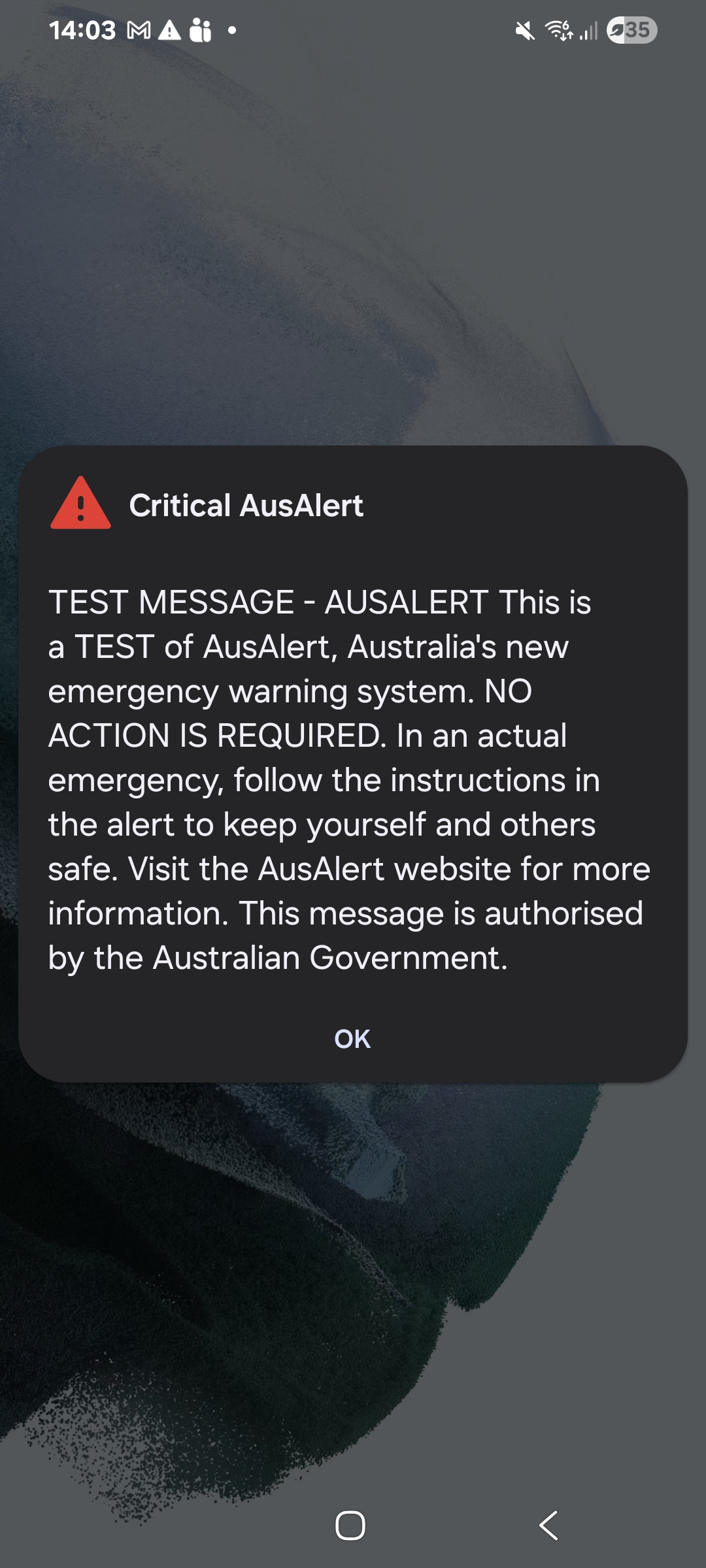
AusAlert test message delivered to a Samsung smartphone

The 1970s saw the introduction of the Standard Emergency Warning Signal (SEWS) for consistent public alerting of impeding cyclones. This was broadcast to radios and televisions. In 1995 the SEWS siren became the national emergency warning signal. The Emergency Alert Australia system was established in 2009 sending out SMS messages to mobile phones or auto-dialling landline telephones.

The Emergency Alert system was used in the 2019–20 Black Summer Bushfires, with 493,000 landline calls and 4.2 million text messages sent to residents in affected areas.

SEWS (and the associated Emergency Alert) forms part of "Australia's Emergency Warning Arrangements".

=== Royal commission ===
The Royal Commission into National Natural Disaster Arrangements in 2020 found emergency warning systems were effective tools for governments to use to alert citizens of threats, but limitations with Emergency Alert meant it was unable to reach everyone facing an "emerging or imminent threat", and the underlying LB-SMS (Location-Based SMS) technology was considered outdated. Findings included:

- for landlines, automated audio alerts failed to be delivered when the telephone was in use when the alert was issued (such as engaged), the telephone was not answered, a power outage and a cordless telephone was being used, the telephone was outside the warning area but still in an at-risk location, and the telephone was not registered under the correct address;
- for mobile phones, text messages failed to be delivered when message inboxes were full, the phone was switched off or outside of a mobile coverage area, the last known location of the mobile phone was outside the defined warning area when the alert was issued but still at risk, individuals had not updated their address, the phone had moved into a warning area after the alert had been issued and sent to devices, and the phone was in a mobile coverage blackspot; and
- the state-based nature of Emergency Alert meant it was possible for residents living near a state's border to receive an emergency alert sent by the system from the other state, as those residents' landlines may be connected to the network of the other state. For instance, New South Wales border residents could receive an alert issued by Queensland authorities because their proximity to Queensland meant they were connected to the telephone network in Queensland.

It was found that a review of new and emerging telephony technologies for use beyond 2023–24 to improve the issuing of emergency alerts nationwide, including for those with a disability or are culturally or linguistically diverse had been commissioned by the Department of Home Affairs through Emergency Management Australia. The Commission recommended the review, funding and upgrade of Emergency Alert be considered a priority to ensure it used the best available technology to improve the way warnings are issued, and to better cater to those with a disability and culturally and linguistically diverse communities.

After receiving $2.2 million in funding from the 2021 budget, in August 2021, the Australian Government issued a tender for proposals from suppliers for a cell broadcast-based emergency warning system, with implementation slated for January 2022, and a three-year contract starting the same year.

=== Tests ===
Following some localised tests, a nationwide test was completed on 27 July 2026 at 14:00 in the Australian Capital Territory, New South Wales, Queensland, Tasmania and Victoria, at 13:30 in South Australia and the Northern Territory, and at 12:00 in Western Australia.

The minister for emergency management says that 94% of phone towers broadcast the message successfully, above NEMA's 90% goal.

== Product ==
=== Functionality ===
AusAlert will utilise cell broadcast technology, which allows messages to be broadcast directly from a radio cell site to all devices in the vicinity, rather than disseminating alerts through text messages to devices in a specified location as with the current Emergency Alert system. NEMA says the technology will allow for "near real-time", simultaneous messaging to all devices in a specified area and is unconstrained by telecommunications network congestion, a problem which arose with the current system. Messages would have a character limit of 1395 characters, and would be able to have a priority level specified that would differentiate the way messages are displayed on receiving devices.

There are two types of alerts:

- critical, highest level, indicating the person may be in danger. The device will sound the siren regardless of any user-engaged silent or Do Not Disturb functions; and
- priority, indicating there may be a threat presence.

Both alerts will advise the recipient to 'visit nema.gov.au for more information'.

Transmitting to compatible devices, tablets, and smartwatches, users will get a fixed-volume loud siren for ten seconds. The siren tone is not the same as the SEWS, Alert Ready (Canada), or J-Alert (Japan), but is similar to Emergency Mobile Alert (New Zealand), Wireless Emergency Alerts (United States), Emergency Cell Broadcast System (Philippines), and EU-Alert.

Devices receiving alerts under the new system would display an on-screen message that cannot be easily dismissed. Messaging will align to the new Australian Warning System, but messages will only be in English. Location targeting under the new system would allow an area as small as a one-kilometre radius to be defined (down to 160 metres (520 ft) area), and would also enable messages to be sent to individual local government areas.

=== Criteria ===
The broadcast is said to be constrained only to the affected area(s), but what is an emergency or disaster is quite broad: security threats, public health emergencies, biosecurity incidents, and natural hazards like bushfires, floods, cyclones and tsunamis.

=== Introduction ===
AusAlert went live on 1 October 2026, replacing the old SMS-based alert system.

== Concerns ==
AusAlert was costed at an initial $10 million, but it is estimated the cost will reach $132 million.

A number of issues are not addressed by NEMA including if messages will be displayed once a device is turned on, and the siren volume inside a motorcyclist helmet fitted with Bluetooth intercom. For persons subject of surveillance tracking, coercive control, or domestic violence, a hidden or backup telephone, even without a SIM, will ring, and may endanger those persons' safety. The domestic violence concerns were also raised in 2023 in the United Kingdom, but where persons could opt out or the phone would respect silent mode being turned on.

In mid-July 2026 some agencies including the Queensland Fire Department indicated they would not be using the software in its current form as it does not work for landline telephones and incompatible older mobile telephones, and the alert's once-off display meant it could not be reviewed or shared. Some unfounded conspiracies also were aired such as government tracking and using aluminium foil as a Faraday cage.

== See also ==
- Cell Broadcast
- Early warning system
- Emergency communication system
- Emergency population warning broadcasting
- Emergency Alert System (United States)
- Alert Ready (Canada)
- J-Alert (Japan)
