= Tornado warning =

Weather warning indicating imminent danger of tornadoes

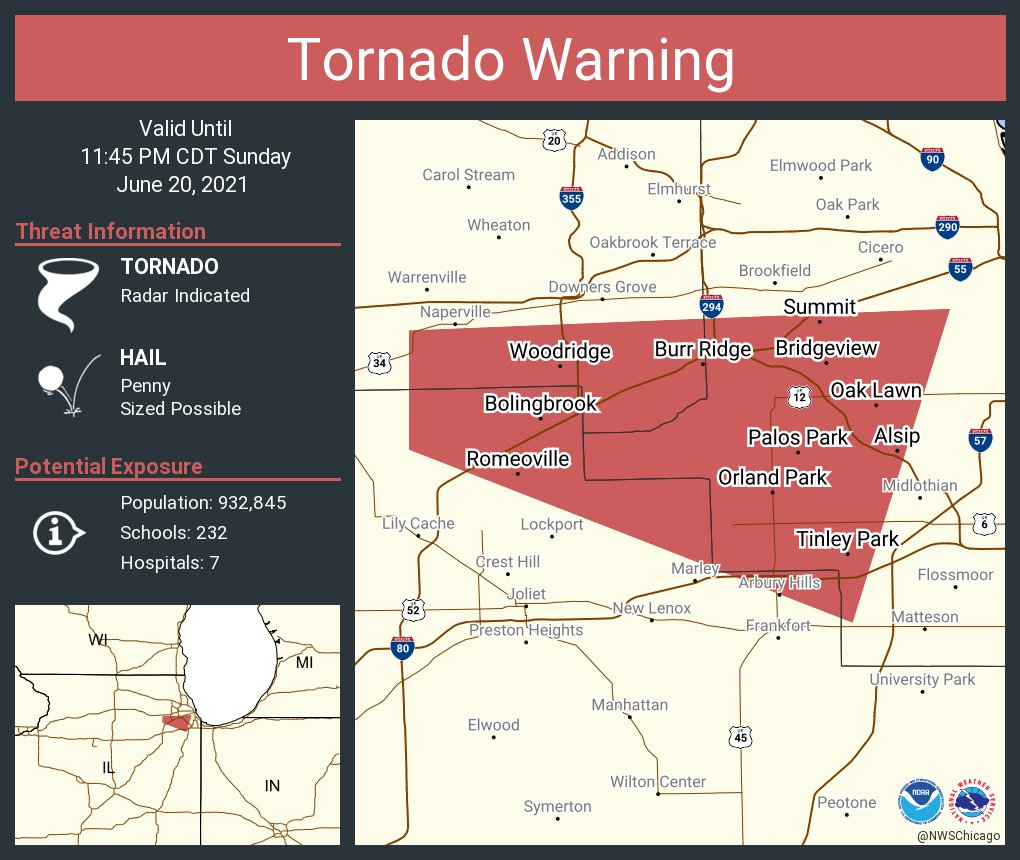
An example of a tornado warning polygon issued by the National Weather Service

A tornado warning (SAME code: TOR) is a public warning that is issued by national meteorological services for an area in the path of a tornado, or a severe thunderstorm capable of producing one, and advises individuals in that area to take cover. They are often issued based on detection of rotation in a thunderstorm by a Doppler weather radar which can provide earlier warning. Modern enhancements to radar can also allow confirmation and tracking of a tornado by the presence of a debris signature. They are also issued based on reported visual sighting of a tornado, funnel cloud, or rotating wall cloud by weather spotters, the public, law enforcement, or local emergency management. In some cases, radar detection may be limited or hindered by distance, terrain, or outright unavailability, making such ground truth crucial and complementary. Likewise, a tornado may be obscured by heavy precipitation, occur at night, or both, making spotting extremely dangerous or impossible. A tornado may also develop in a gap of radar coverage, of which there are several known in the United States.

A warning should not be confused with a tornado watch, issued in the United States by the Storm Prediction Center (SPC) and in other countries by applicable regional forecasting agencies or national severe weather guidance centers, which only indicates that conditions are favorable for the formation of tornadoes. Although a tornado warning is generally a higher alert level than a tornado watch, in the U.S., it can be surpassed by a higher-level alert—structured as wording that can be added to the official warning product—to warn the public of intense tornadoes affecting a densely populated area.

A tornado watch is not required for a warning to be issued; tornado warnings are occasionally issued when a tornado watch is not active (i.e. when a severe thunderstorm watch is active, or when no watches are in effect), if a severe thunderstorm develops and has a confirmed tornado or strong rotation.

== History in the United States ==
=== Early history ===
In April 1899, the Chicago Tribune wrote to the United States Weather Bureau via a news article posing the question on why tornado warnings are not sent out via telegraphs or even the telephone to warn the local population in the path. Cleveland Abbe responded by saying "it is certain that if any such arrangement were possible, the Weather Bureau would have done this many years ago" along with "we must remember that the destructive areas of tornadoes, and even of thunderstorms, are so small that the chance of being injured is exceedingly slight" and that "we do not attempt to prevent that which is inevitable". They also wrote that the chance of being injured by a tornado is "one in ten thousand years".

In June 1899, U.S. Weather Bureau Oklahoma section director J. I. Widmeyer published that long-range forecasters in Oklahoma were sounding "unnecessary tornado alarms" due to "ignorant predictions" to residents in Oklahoma and that they were causing "frightened men, women, and children" to take shelter, despite no tornadoes occurring. Cleveland Abbe added on to the publication by Widmeyer saying, "it is unnecessary to resort to the caves and cellars, or to stop our ordinary avocations for fear of a tornado, until we see the cloud in the distance, or are positively certain that one is about to pass near us".

In April 1908, the U.S. Weather Bureau published several replies regarding a question posed to the Weather Bureau on: How can we protect against tornadoes?.

- Lieutenant John Park Finley responded with "the best we can do is to watch the distant tornado, and if it seems to approach us then move away toward the left; so far as we have learned, this still continues to be the best rule".
- The Chief of the Weather Bureau responded with the idea to establish a warning system by surrounding a city at a distance of 4 mi (6.4 km) with wires hooked up with alarms. That way, a warning can be given to the city for an impending tornado. The wire system would detect sudden pressure differences, if wires were twisted, or if wires were short circuited. It was also stated that at a distance of four miles from the city, the tornado "would be unable to reach the city from any direction without giving us an alarm".
- Cleveland Abbe responded by saying the idea of a wire-based system around a city is not practical as well as how tornadoes are very infrequent. Abbe ended by saying that "the mere forewarning of a tornado is no protection against its coming" and that it would be wiser to "spend your money to protect yourself against diseases, accidents, lightning, ect…".

In 1938, the Weather Bureau rescinded its ban on the usage of the word "tornado" in weather products disseminated to emergency management personnel. The Bureau would develop a network of volunteer storm spotters in the early 1940s during World War II, to provide warning of tornadoes to workers in munitions plants and strategic factories. The ban on issuing tornado warnings to the general public would not be revoked until Chief of Bureau Francis W. Reichelderfer officially lifted the ban in a Circular Letter issued on July 12, 1950, to all first order stations: "Weather Bureau employees should avoid statements that can be interpreted as a negation of the Bureau's willingness or ability to make tornado forecasts", and that a "good probability of verification" exist when issuing such forecasts due to the difficulty in accurately predicting tornadic activity. The American Meteorological Society agreed to have Miller and Fawbush present their methodology for forecasting tornadoes during the organization's 1950 meeting in St. Louis; after garnering press coverage for their successful prediction of past tornadoes, AMS representatives decided to open the presentation to the public.

The first official tornado forecast was made by United States Air Force Capt. (later Col.) Robert C. Miller and Major Ernest Fawbush, on March 25, 1948. The first such forecast came after the events that occurred five days earlier on March 20, 1948; Miller – a California native who became stationed at Tinker Air Force Base three weeks earlier – was assigned to work the late shift as a forecaster for the base's Air Weather Service office that evening, analyzing U.S. Weather Bureau surface maps and upper-air charts that failed to note atmospheric instability and moisture content present over Oklahoma that would be suitable for producing thunderstorm activity, erroneously forecasting dry conditions for that night. Thunderstorms soon developed southwest of Oklahoma City, and at 9:30 p.m., forecasters from Will Rogers Airport sent a warning to Tinker that the storm encroaching the city was producing wind gusts of 92 miles per hour (148 km/h) and a "Tornado South on Ground Moving NE!" Base personnel received an alert written by the staff sergeant on duty with Miller; the tornado struck Tinker several minutes later around 10:00 p.m., damaging several military aircraft (with total damage estimated at $10 million) that could not be secured in time before it crossed the base grounds.

Following an inquiry the next day before a tribunal of five generals who traveled to Tinker from Washington, D.C., who ruled that the March 20 tornado was an "act of God ... not forecastable given the present state of the art", base commander Gen. Fred Borum tasked Miller and Fawbush to follow up on the board's suggestion to consider methods of forecasting tornadic thunderstorms. Over the next three days, Miller and Fawbush studied reports and charts from previous tornado events to determine the atmospheric conditions favorable for the development of tornadic activity, in an effort to predict such events with some degree of accuracy. At the time, there had not been studies on how tornadoes formed; however, military radars were being adapted for forecasting use, allowing forecasters to see the outlines of storms but not their internal attributes such as rotation. Miller and Fawbush's findings on atmospheric phenomenon present in past outbreaks would aid in their initial forecast, as the day's surface and upper-air analysis charts determined the same conditions present on March 20 were present on the 25th, concluded that central Oklahoma would have the highest risk for tornadoes during the late-afternoon and evening.

Borum, who had put together a severe weather safety plan for base personnel, then suggested that Miller and Fawbush issue a severe thunderstorm forecast, and then asked the men if they would issue a tornado forecast based on the similarities between the conditions that produced the tornado which hit the base five days earlier, which they were reluctant to do. Fawbush wrote the forecast message that Miller would type and issued it to base operations at 2:50 p.m. as thunderstorms were approaching from North Texas. Defying the high odds against two tornadoes hitting the same area in five days, one hit the Tinker campus around 6:00 p.m., to the surprise of Miller (who left the base an hour earlier, believing their forecast would not pan out), who found out about the storm (produced by two thunderstorms that merged to the southwest of Tinker) via a radio report. Miller and Fawbush would not put out another tornado forecast until March 25, 1949, when they successfully predicted tornadic activity would occur in southeastern Oklahoma.

Miller and Fawbush soon would distribute their tornado forecasts to the American Red Cross and Oklahoma Highway Patrol, after giving William Maughan, chief meteorologist at the U.S. Weather Bureau's Oklahoma City office (who provided them with additional archived weather data to help fine-tune their forecasts), permission to relay their forecasts to those agencies. The relative accuracy of the forecasts restarted a debate over their reliability and whether military or civilian agencies should have jurisdiction over the issuance of weather warnings. The USAF had pioneered tornado forecasting and tornado warnings, although John P. Finley had developed the first experimental tornado forecasts in 1885. Two years later, he and other officials with the agency were prohibited by the United States Signal Service's weather service from using the word "tornado" in forecasts. They were instead directed to refer to "severe local storms". This position on tornado forecasting would be shared by the U.S. Weather Bureau after its formation in 1890, fearing that tornado forecasts were insufficiently reliable and that such warnings would incite panic among the public. The side effect of this policy was that the lack of warning resulted in a steady increase in the number of tornado-related fatalities through the 1950s, with some events prior to 1948 (such as the deadliest tornado in U.S. history, the Tri-State Tornado in March 1925, and the Glazier–Higgins–Woodward tornadoes in April 1947) having death tolls well over 100.

The Air Force began issuing severe weather forecasts relayed to Weather Bureau offices and emergency personnel in tornado-prone regions through the formation of the Severe Weather Warning Center in 1951, before the Bureau's contention that the USAF intruded on its responsibility to relay such forecasts led to the SWWC limiting the release of its tornado forecasts to military personnel; however, the move to prohibit the USAF from widespread releasing of tornado forecasts led to disapproval and heavy criticism from Oklahoma media outlets, given the agency's continued refusal to provide public tornado warnings. The Weather Bureau issued its first experimental public tornado forecast in March 1952, which proved inaccurate and was released too late to become widely available for public consumption; however, a forecast issued the following evening managed to predict an outbreak of tornadoes across most of the warned seven-state area (from Texas to Indiana).

Even after the U.S. Weather Bureau lifted their ban on tornado warnings, the Federal Communications Commission continued to ban television and radio outlets from broadcasting tornado warnings on-air for the same reasoning cited in the Bureau's abolished ban. Broadcast media followed this ban until 1954, when meteorologist Harry Volkman broadcast the first televised tornado warning over WKY-TV (now KFOR-TV) in Oklahoma City, due to his belief that the banning of tornado warnings over broadcast media cost lives. Through an alert issued by the USAF Severe Weather Warning Center, Volkman opted to interrupt regular programming to warn viewers of a reported tornado approaching the Oklahoma City area; although station management and U.S. Weather Bureau officials were displeased with his move, WKY-TV received numerous telephone calls and letters thanking Volkman for the warning.

== Definition ==
A tornado warning is issued when any of the following conditions has occurred:

- a tornado is reported on the ground, or
- a funnel cloud has been reported, or
- strong low-level rotation is indicated by weather radar, or
- a waterspout is headed for landfall.

A tornado warning means there is immediate danger for the warned area and immediate surrounding locations from the severe thunderstorm producing (or likely to produce) a tornado, if not from the relatively narrow tornado itself. Persons in the path of a warned storm are urged to immediately seek shelter in a basement, cellar, safe room or a sturdy above-ground room in the center section of a home or building (such as a bathroom or closet). In addition to the likelihood of a tornado, generally (but not always), a tornado warning also indicates that the parent severe thunderstorm has the likelihood of producing straight-line winds and/or large hail exceeding regional severe criterion as well as intense lightning, heavy rainfall and/or, through associated rain accumulations, flash flooding. (The classifiable criteria for a severe thunderstorm vary by country; e.g., in the United States, a thunderstorm is considered severe if it produces winds exceeding 58 mph [93 km/h] and/or hailstones one inch [2.5 cm] or larger in diameter.) A tornado warning therefore implies that it is also a severe thunderstorm warning. Conversely, a severe thunderstorm warning, either in its entirety or sectionally, can be replaced by a tornado warning if a storm exhibits credible characteristics of tornadogenesis from radar and ground observations.

Tornado warnings are issued by weather forecasting agencies based on mesocyclone and debris signatures identifiable on Doppler weather radar, and/or ground truth from storm spotters of signs of tornadogenesis (including wall clouds, funnel clouds and low-level mesocyclonic rotation) and of observed tornadoes. Skywarn, a U.S.-based international spotter program that provides training to citizens on how to spot severe weather phenomena, is offered by forecasting agencies in several countries including the National Weather Service (NWS) in the United States. Used in tandem with Doppler weather radar information, eyewitness reports can be very helpful for warning the public of an impending tornado, especially when used for ground truthing. Other spotter groups such as the Amateur Radio Emergency Service, news media, local law enforcement agencies, emergency management organizations, cooperative observers; members of the general public also relay information to forecasting agencies for ground truthing.

When a warning is issued, people in the storm's path are advised to use local broadcast media, weather radio, weather app alert notifications and/or SMS notifications to receive warnings and updated storm information. In some tornado-prone regions, tornado sirens, if present, are usually activated within the specified warning region or an entire municipality—varying in coverage based on if a local siren network maintains a sector-organized relay structure—to inform people that a tornado has been sighted or may be forming nearby. Because sirens are generally difficult to hear indoors, residents are advised against completely depending on them as a method of receiving warnings. Local police or fire departments may dispatch crews not assigned to an existing emergency call to travel within a designated area to warn residents to take tornado safety precautions if sirens are disabled due to technical problems or are not present, while automated phone calls may be made to residents for the same purpose in some areas should such disruptions occur.

Advances in technology, both in identifying conditions and in distributing warnings effectively, have been credited with reducing the death toll from tornadoes. The average warning times have increased substantially from -10 to -15 minutes in 1974 to about 15 minutes as of 2013 (in some cases, the lead time can extend to more than an hour's warning of impending tornadoes). In the United States, the tornado death rate has declined from 1.8 deaths per million people per year in 1925 to only 0.11 per million in 2000. Much of this change is credited to improvements in the tornado warning system, via the various advances in the detection of severe local storms, along with an increase in reports visually confirming severe weather activity via storm spotters, public officials and citizens.

=== Regional basis ===
==== United States ====
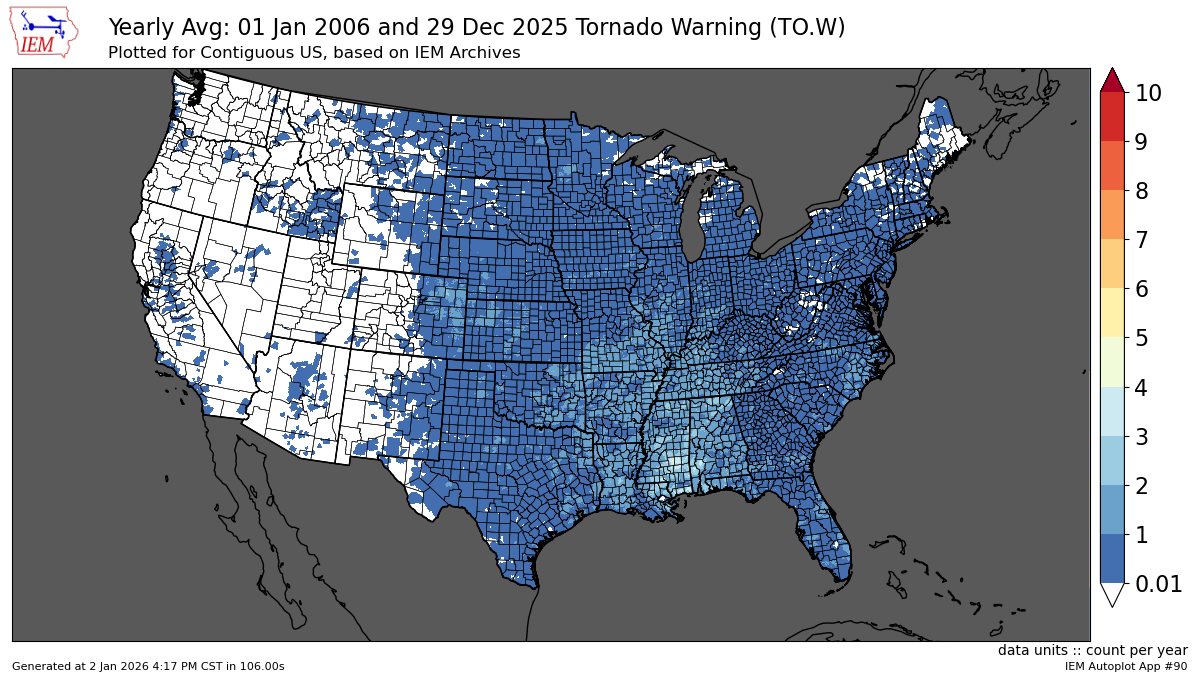
Map of average annual tornado warnings in the United States between 2006 and 2025.

In the United States, tornado warnings are issued by local Weather Forecast Offices of the National Weather Service, which, in conjunction with the Storm Prediction Center, maintains a multi-tier public warning system to disseminate probabilistic outlooks and alerts for tornadoes:

1. Convective Outlook (categorical and probabilistic forecasts issued at least twice per day to describe threats of general or severe convective storms; severe thunderstorm outlooks for the Day 1 and Day 2 periods include charts and maps assessing tornado probabilities)
2. Public Severe Weather Outlook (issued when a significant or widespread severe thunderstorm/tornado outbreak is expected or, particularly from November to March, when strong tornadoes are forecast to occur after nightfall)
3. Tornado Watch
4. PDS Tornado Watch (upgraded wording indicating the likelihood of a significant tornado outbreak and/or a credible threat of strong to violent tornadoes within the watch area)
5. Tornado Warning
6. PDS Tornado Warning
7. Tornado Emergency

Local NWS forecast offices utilize WarnGen software integrated into the Advance Weather Interactive Processing System (AWIPS) to generate the warning statement, which is disseminated through various communication routes accessed by the media and various agencies, on the internet, to NOAA satellites, and over NOAA Weather Radio; additionally, the National Weather Service has the option of requesting activation of the Emergency Alert System (EAS) to interrupt television and radio broadcasts to get the bulletin out quickly. Warnings for tornadoes and severe thunderstorms are outlined in polygonal shapes for map-based weather hazard products distributed to the main agency, individual forecast office websites and the Storm Prediction Center (including open-source APIs available for free use to public weather websites and mobile apps), based on the storm's projected path as determined by Doppler radar at the time of the warning's issuance. In NWS text products, warnings are usually illustrated by individual counties, parishes or other county-equivalent jurisdictions (sections or the entirety thereof, and in list format if it covers more than one jurisdiction), particularly dependent on the jurisdiction's total land area. Prior to October 2007, warnings were issued by the National Weather Service on a per-county basis. SPC and NWS products as well as severe weather alert displays used by some television stations, and desktop and mobile radar software typically highlight tornado warnings with a red or purple polygon or filled county/parish/equivalent jurisdiction outline. (Since the late 2010s, Baron Services broadcast radar software and some public commercial radar software, such as GRLevelX, have used custom polygon coloring to denote tornado warnings based on impact level: usually, purple to indicate warnings for a confirmed tornado and inlined black-on-purple to indicate tornado emergencies.)

The NWS has the option of adding intensified wording to tornado warning products and update statements issued as a Severe Weather Statement (SVS)—"particularly dangerous situation" (PDS) or "tornado emergency"—when a severe threat to human life and considerable or catastrophic property damage from a visually observed or radar-detected large tornado is imminent or ongoing. Tornado emergencies and PDS tornado warnings—which, when warranted, are usually issued when a large tornado is expected to impact a populated area—typically include action statements indicating that the tornado is extremely dangerous and life-threatening, and capable of significant if not total property destruction and severe injury or death from the intense winds and projectile debris; tornado warnings that have the "tornado emergency" wording typically incorporate a combination of the emergency and PDS phrasing above the text's basis (or "hazard") statement.

In March 2012, as part of its implementation of a multi-tier Impact Based Warning (IBW) system to notify the public and emergency management officials of the severity of specific severe weather phenomena, the NWS Weather Forecast Offices in Wichita and Topeka, Kansas, and Springfield, St. Louis and Kansas City/Pleasant Hill, Missouri, began incorporating categorical tornado and damage threat indicators for visually confirmed and radar-indicated tornadoes that appear at the bottom of the text products for tornado warnings and associated Severe Weather Statements providing updated storm information. The categorical criteria—which are applicable to all NWS Weather Forecast Offices, primarily those operating within the agency's Central and Southern Region divisions—were introduced to further communicate to the public and prevent complacency of the threat of tornadoes. The NWS expanded the threat and damage indicators to 33 additional Central Region WFOs in March 2013; eight additional offices operating within the Eastern, Southern and Western Region divisions began using the IBW indicators in March 2014. The entire agency began using the format in 2016; IBW formatting was fully implemented for other individual warning bulletins in July 2021, when all NWS offices incorporated damage threat indicators into severe thunderstorm warnings. The threat indicators consist of four coded taglines, ascending by observational level and damage threat:

- Radar Indicated – Doppler weather radar indicates the thunderstorm is exhibiting mesocyclonic circulation supportive of tornado formation; generally requires no visual confirmation of a tornado at the time the initial warning or a subsequent severe weather statement is issued. Hazard statements will classify the tornadic rotation as "radar indicated" or "radar-indicated rotation" in the bulletin text when identifying the source of the hazard.
- Observed – Tornado is visually confirmed by storm spotters, law enforcement or other emergency personnel, or detected on radar in concert with an observed intense velocity couplet and/or debris signature. Hazard statements within the bulletin text will indicate a "damaging tornado."
- Considerable (originally "Significant" during the 2012 Kansas and Missouri tests) – Typically reserved for PDS tornado warnings, it indicates credible evidence exists (through visual or radar confirmation) that a tornado capable of producing considerable damage is imminent or ongoing. As with warnings containing the "observed" tag, bulletins with this indicator will classify a "damaging tornado" in the hazard statement.
- Catastrophic – Generally reserved for warnings containing Tornado Emergency wording, it indicates reliable sources have confirmed a violent tornado posing a severe threat to human life and catastrophic property damage is occurring. In most instances, bulletins with this indicator will classify a "deadly tornado" in the hazard statement.

On August 15, 2020, for the first time in history, the National Weather Service issued a tornado warning for pyrocumulonimbus capable of producing a tornado in southeastern Lassen County, California, which was being affected by the Loyalton Fire.

In April 2023, U.S. Sen. Roger Wicker (R–MS) introduced the Tornado Observation Research Notification and Deployment to Operations (TORNADO) Act. The bill would establish a Hazard Risk Communication Office to propose improvements in the National Oceanic and Atmospheric Administration (NOAA)’s methods for predicting severe weather events and communicating weather alerts to the public—requiring NOAA to coordinate with government and emergency management to optimize collection and sharing of storm survey data, implement high-resolution probabilistic tornado forecast guidance systems, and make recommendations for revisions to the Enhanced Fujita Scale.

==== Canada ====
In Canada, Environment and Climate Change Canada issues tornado warnings through regional Meteorological Service offices based in Vancouver, Edmonton, Winnipeg, Toronto, Montreal and Dartmouth for specified municipalities and census subdivisions. Although issuance criteria are similar to the U.S. National Weather Service, Meteorological Service-issued tornado warnings can include areas not in the immediate approximate path of the tornadic thunderstorm but are in an environment conducive to tornado development from adjacent thunderstorms during the warning timeframe (similar to but covering a smaller total area than tornado watches issued by the U.S. Storm Prediction Center).

Warnings are disseminated to the public through broadcast and online media outlets, and Weatheradio Canada; depending on storm severity and regional office discretion, the warning may require activation of depending on storm severity and regional office discretion, the warning may require activation of the National Public Alerting System (Alert Ready) (French: Système national d'alertes à la population [En Alerte]) and feeding provincial alerting systems (such as Alberta Emergency Alert and SaskAlert) to distribute the alert to local broadcast media and cellular phones. Separately, Emergency Management Ontario—upon implementing the system in 2008—issues red alerts for sections of the province under an Environment Canada-issued tornado warning, and can sometimes override the tornado warning if local government or media outlets participate in the program.

Since implementation of the colour-coded warning system in late 2025, the Weather impact guides state the following according to Environment Canada's MSC for adverse impacts expected from violently rotating, damaging winds associated with thunderstorms:

===== Yellow =====
- Travel routes difficult or dangerous to navigate
- Travel delays due to road closures, debris, power outages
- High-sided vehicles pushed around
- Local utility/power interruptions or outages
- Outdoor events postponed or cancelled
- Damage to trees
- Minor damage to property including buildings, vehicles, signs, fences, loose items
- Risk of injury from flying or falling debris
- They are the most common

===== Orange =====
- Travel routes dangerous to navigate
- Widespread travel disruption
- Widespread utility outages
- Significant, widespread tree damage
- Essential services delays; significant delays for emergency responders
- Significant damage to buildings and property including boats, sheds, RVs, small planes
- Increased risk of serious injury from flying or falling debris or collapsing structures/trees
- Some critical infrastructure damage
- They are uncommon

===== Red =====
- Very dangerous and/or impassable travel routes
- Prolonged, widespread travel disruption including vehicles blown around or destroyed
- Prolonged, widespread utility/extreme power outages
- Transmission/utility tower collapse
- Stands of trees (forests, orchards, parks) flattened/destroyed
- Prolonged essential services disruption
- Homes/buildings destroyed
- High risk of serious injury from flying/falling debris or collapsing structures/trees
- Major agriculture/livestock losses
- Critical infrastructure compromised/destroyed; supply chain impacted
- They are rare

==== Australia ====
In Australia, tornado warnings are issued by regional offices of the Bureau of Meteorology (BOM) based in Melbourne Docklands, Adelaide, Darwin, Perth and Brisbane. BOM-issued tornado warnings are outlined as either a broad-based warning, covering expected impacts within a weather reporting area, or as a detailed warning, when a thunderstorm is within weather-watch radar range and includes a map depicting any existing thunderstorms and the forecast direction of movement for up to 60 minutes. Warnings are disseminated to the public through terrestrial and online media outlets, and through activation of Emergency Alert Australia to distribute the alert to local broadcast media (led by the Standard Emergency Warning Signal tone), SMS messaging and automated landline phone calls.

Tornado Alert sirens and Fire Tornado Alert sirens part of the Emergency Alert Australia plan, HHEM His Highness Emergency Management plan, Emergency Management Australia plan, HH government plan and the Australian Government plan.

== Related warnings and alerts ==
=== Tornado alert ===
For many years until the early 1980s, an intermediate type of tornado advisory known as a tornado alert was defined by the National Weather Service and issued by the agency's local forecast offices, indicating that tornado formation was imminent. In theory, tornado alerts covered situations such as visible rotation in clouds and certain other phenomena which are portents of funnel cloud formation. The National Weather Service's use of this advisory began to decline after 1974, although it was still listed on public information materials issued by various media outlets, local NWS offices and other entities for another decade or so.

The criteria which called for tornado alerts in the past now generally result in a tornado warning with clarifying verbiage specifying that the warning was issued because rotation was detected in one way or another, that a wall cloud has formed or a tornado has been spotted or detected. The preferred response to both the tornado alerts and warnings is to take shelter immediately, so distinguishing them could be seen as splitting hairs, especially since storm prediction methods have improved.

The tornado alert was finally eliminated outright because it was made largely obsolete by the advent of Doppler weather radar, which can detect rotational funnel cloud formations earlier than is typically possible by trained spotters and members of the public. With fewer false-positives, radar also helped reduce public confusion over storm types, strengths and precise locations. The last tornado alert to be officially issued was discussed in earnest following the 1974 Super Outbreak.

=== Tornado emergency ===
The National Weather Service has the option of issuing a tornado emergency, a severe weather statement with unofficial, enhanced wording that is disseminated when reliable sources confirm that a violent tornado is ongoing, that poses a catastrophic risk for damage and threat to human life. This category of weather statement is the highest and most urgent level relating to tornadoes, albeit an unofficial alert product. The first tornado emergency was declared on May 3, 1999, when an F5 tornado struck southern portions of the Oklahoma City metropolitan area, causing major damage exceeding $1 billion. In some cases, such as an F3 tornado that struck the Indianapolis, Indiana metropolitan area on September 20, 2002, a tornado emergency has been declared within the initial issuance of the tornado warning. Not all confirmed tornadoes will be considered a "tornado emergency", and such statements are commonly declared when it is believed that the tornado is at a severity in which it would cause a significant threat to life and property.

Greensburg tornado warning
NOAA Weather Radio audio of a tornado warning issued for Greensburg, Kansas on May 4, 2007, Greensburg was struck by an EF5 tornado.

Tornado warning South Carolina
A tornado warning issued in South Carolina during the tornado outbreak of November 27–30, 2016

== See also ==
- Severe weather terminology (United States)
- Emergency Broadcast System
- Emergency Alert System
- Microburst
- Emergency Communication System
