= Tornado watch =

Weather watch indicating a risk of tornadoes

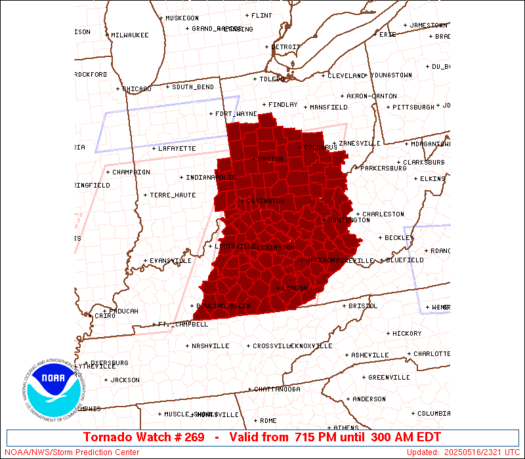
Tornado Watch issued prior to the 2025 Somerset–London tornado.

A tornado watch (SAME code: TOA) is a statement issued by weather forecasting agencies to advise the public that atmospheric conditions in a given region may lead to the development of tornadoes within (or near) the region over a period of several hours. In addition to the potential for tornado development, thunderstorms that develop within the watch area may contain large hail, strong straight-line winds, and intense rainfall and/or flooding, all of which may pose a similar damage risk as the attendant tornado threat.

A watch must not be confused with a tornado warning, and encourages the public to remain vigilant for the onset of severe weather, including possible tornadoes. A tornado watch does not mean a tornado has been observed or will occur, just that favorable conditions increase the likelihood of such storms happening, and may be issued several hours ahead of the formation or arrival of potentially tornadic thunderstorms.

== Definition ==
A tornado watch indicates that atmospheric conditions observed in and close to the watch area have created a significant risk for the development and intensification of severe convective thunderstorms capable of producing tornadoes, and are normally issued in advance of the onset of severe weather. If severe weather actually does occur, a severe thunderstorm warning or tornado warning would then be issued. Residents and travelers in the watch area are advised to immediately undertake safety preparations ahead of the arrival of severe weather. A tornado watch is not required for a warning to be issued; tornado warnings are occasionally issued when a tornado watch is not active (i.e., when a severe thunderstorm watch is active or if conditions for tornadic development are not expected to be substantive enough to require a watch), if a severe thunderstorm has a confirmed tornado or developed strong rotation. A tornado watch can replace an existing severe thunderstorm watch, if not merely a portion of it, if conditions that were originally considered marginally conducive, if at all for tornadic development have evolved to permit a greater risk of tornado formation.

Although the risk of tornadoes is emphasized as the primary hazard, depending on storm cell intensity, the probability exists for other hazardous phenomena exceeding regional severe criterion to occur: severe thunderstorms that develop within the watch area will also pose a likelihood of producing large hailstones, intense straight-line winds that can produce serious structural damage equivalent to a lower-category tornado over a comparatively broader areal swath, intense lightning, torrential rainfall and/or flash flooding caused by high rainfall accumulations. A tornado watch therefore implies that it is also a severe thunderstorm watch.

When a tornado watch is issued, people within the region of expected tornado threat are advised to review safety precautions in the event they must seek immediate shelter in a basement, cellar, safe room or a sturdy above-ground room in the center section of a home or building (such as a bathroom or closet) when a tornado warning or severe thunderstorm warning is issued for their area. Residents are also advised to monitor conditions ahead of the developing weather situation, and keep abreast of warnings and updated storm information through local broadcast media, weather radio, weather app alert notifications, SMS notifications and/or automated emergency phone calls. Where present, tornado sirens and local police or fire department dispatch units are also used as an outdoor warning system in the event of a tornado or particularly intense non-tornadic thunderstorm in some tornado-prone regions.

=== Regional basis ===
==== United States ====
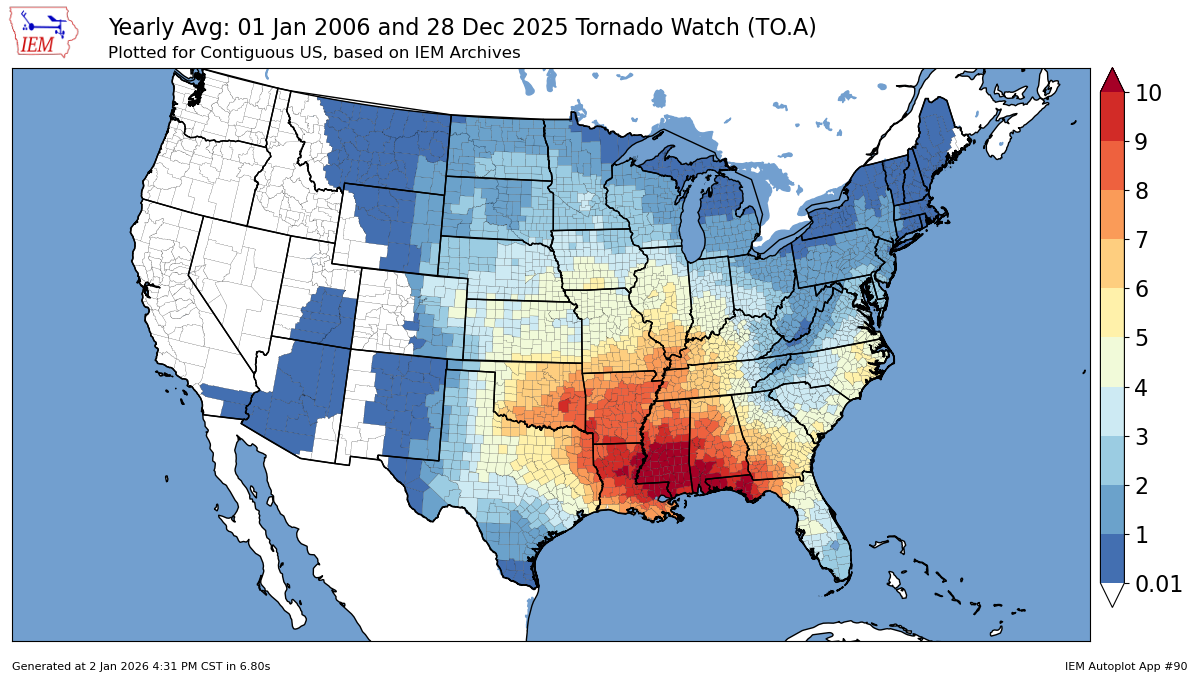
Map of average annual tornado watches in the United States between 2006 and 2025.

In the United States, tornado watches are issued by the Storm Prediction Center (SPC), a national guidance center of the National Weather Service (NWS), for areas of the lower 48 states where atmospheric conditions favor the development of tornadoes and accompanying severe thunderstorms. Although watch issuances for those states are exceedingly rare as their respective climates are less favorable for the kind of convective conditions capable of tornadogenesis, responsibilities for issuing tornado watches covering Alaska and Hawaii are respectively handled by local NWS forecast offices in Fairbanks, Anchorage and Juneau, Alaska, and Honolulu, Hawaii. Watches are typically valid for six to nine hours (extending if necessary as long as 12 hours during tropical cyclones or other unusually steady-state or slow-moving severe weather events) after the time of issuance, and are intended to precede the first reported tornado by two hours and the first report of severe hail or wind by one hour. SPC watch boxes—termed because the approximate watch area is represented in weather maps as a quadrilateral for aviation purposes—are usually outlined in the approximate delineation of x miles north and south, or east and west, or either side of a line (perpendicular to the center line) from y miles direction of city, state, to z miles another direction of another city, state (e.g., "50 miles either side of a line from 10 miles northeast of Columbia, South Carolina to 15 miles south-southwest of Montgomery, Alabama"). Geographic coverage of tornado watches (which ranges from 20,000–40,000 square miles [52,000–104,000 km^{2}] on average, encompassing portions of one or more states) vary based on the size of the land area under threat, the duration of severe weather risk, and the forward motion of the parent storm system and associated surface boundaries.

In situations in which the SPC has outlined a “high risk” or high-end “moderate risk” of severe convective storms within and near the watch area, the intensified wording "particularly dangerous situation" (PDS) can be added into the watch product to highlight high forecaster confidence that atmospheric conditions support the development of multiple strong to violent tornadoes (rated EF2–EF5 on the Enhanced Fujita Scale) capable of significant damage, if not total destruction of property and severe injury or death from the intense winds and projectile debris, as well as the possibility of destructive straight-line winds and hail from the parent supercells. (Tornadoes occurring in these situations may develop during the storm's maturation stage under typical low-level mesocyclonic tornadogenesis, or by accelerated mesocyclonic maturation generated early in the thunderstorm's development from sufficient wind shear and very high convective available potential energy [CAPE] values.) PDS tornado watches—which, based on SPC watch issuance averages between 1996 and 2005, account for ~3% of all tornado watches issued per year in the U.S.—usually suggest the likelihood of a major tornado outbreak, although they can be issued if a significant threat exists of isolated intense tornadoes. The SPC (then the National Severe Storms Forecast Center) conceived the PDS verbiage for use in tornado watches in 1981; it was applied to a public tornado watch product for the first time—encompassing portions of northern Texas and southern Oklahoma—during the outbreak of April 2, 1982. (The indicated threat would be verified, with seven of the 14 significant (F3+) tornadoes observed that day—four rated F3, two rated F4 and one rated F5—occurring within the watch area.) In subsequent years but in earnest since 2011, the SPC and the National Weather Service have applied PDS verbiage to other watch and warning types (including tornado warnings, severe thunderstorm watches and warnings, flash flood warnings and red flag warnings) to emphasize an exceptionally high risk to life and property.

SPC meteorologists utilize WarnGen software integrated into the National Centers Advance Weather Interactive Processing System (N-AWIPS) and/or the SPC Product Generator (PRODGEN) to generate the watch statement, which is disseminated through various communication routes accessed by the media and various agencies, on the internet, to NOAA satellites, and over NOAA Weather Radio. The term "red box/polygon" often used in parlance within the meteorological community, refers to the coloring assigned to tornado watch boxes for hazard maps used by the Storm Prediction Center and the National Weather Service; severe weather alert displays used by many local television stations typically assign other colors (most commonly, green, yellow or purple) to highlight tornado watches. (Red, which television alert displays usually reserve as an identifier for tornado warnings, is seldom if ever used to highlight tornado watches.)

The Storm Prediction Center, in conjunction with local NWS Weather Forecast Offices, issues component watch products to communicate the approximate area, primary hazards and other pertinent information about the tornado watch to the public, NOAA meteorologists, emergency management and aviation personnel. The graphical and text Public Watch products—in addition to outlining the approximate affected area, valid time, meteorological and aviation discussions, and other pertinent information—include language specifying the forecast tornado threat (e.g., "several tornadoes and a few intense tornadoes likely"), and attendant severe wind and hail threats (e.g., "widespread damaging wind gusts to 70 mph likely, isolated very large hail events to 2 inches in diameter possible") in the primary hazards list. The Watch Probability Table describes probabilities for all modes of severe weather, including probabilities of two or more tornadoes and one or more strong to violent tornadoes. (Currently, the minimum tornado probabilities for a tornado watch issuance require a ~30% chance of two or more tornado reports and, for PDS watches, an 80% chance of one or more strong tornadoes within the watch area over the valid time period, although that criterion was previously lower.)

The SPC produces two separate products listing all counties or equivalent subdivisions (parishes, independent cities, and coastal marine zones) included in the broader watch area: Watch County Lists (WCL), which are produced internally preceding the watch issuance for collaborative use with local NWS offices to outline counties and equivalent subdivisions being proposed for inclusion in the watch, and Watch Outline Update (WOU) messages, a public list of the determined watch subdivisions published upon the initial tornado watch issuance. Local NWS offices concurrently issue Watch County Notification (WCN) messages that list subdivisions within their designated area of responsibility that the office has considered to be in the initial watch; WCN messages—which the SPC uses as the basis for their Watch Outline Update product—are updated to denote changes to the watch by local WFOs, which are provided responsibility for adding or removing counties/subdivisions from the watch, extending its time of expiration, or cancelling the watch entirely if conditions no longer support a severe weather threat (if atmospheric conditions have become less conducive to form tornadoes or were insufficient for tornadic development compared to earlier forecast analysis). The SPC updates Watch Outline Updates at least on an hourly basis to incorporate changes made by the accordant WFOs in their Watch County Notification messages.

The SPC issues Watch Status Messages to designate areas considered to have a continuing severe weather threat, based primarily on the position of surface features (such as cold fronts and drylines)—and the NWS offices decide what counties to remove from the watch (the local offices will almost always follow the SPC recommendation on the status messages). If conditions are no longer favorable for tornadoes in the watch area, a tornado watch may either be replaced by a severe thunderstorm watch or cancelled outright; likewise, a tornado watch may replace a severe thunderstorm watch, if not merely a section of it, should conditions that were originally forecast to be conducive for non-tornadic severe thunderstorms evolve to allow an increased possibility of tornado formation. If no convective development or tornadic activity occurs, this leads to a tornado watch "bust", which can factor into determinations by the SPC and National Weather Service offices on whether to cancel the watch.

Because the Storm Prediction Center and local National Weather Service WFOs each have roles in the watch issuance process, the subdivisions listed in the Watch Outline Update and Watch County Notification products will sometimes differ from the outlined watch box area, including subdivisions located outside the outlined quadrilateral; however, the local Weather Forecast Office is tasked with determining which counties should be included in or, in lieu of a new downstream watch, added to the designated watch area. The WFOs monitoring their sector of the watch area can also consult, via conference call, with the Storm Prediction Center to relay and determine locally dictated changes to the tornado watch, regarding replacement of the watch and extensions of time and areal coverage if conditions warrant.

==== Canada ====
In Canada, Environment and Climate Change Canada issues tornado watches through regional Meteorological Service offices based in Vancouver, Edmonton, Winnipeg, Toronto, Montreal and Dartmouth. Unlike the box/subdivision structure of watches issued by the U.S. Storm Prediction Center, tornado watches issued by the Meteorological Service are issued strictly for groups of census subdivisions, often covering a total area that is relatively smaller than tornado watches in the U.S.). Watches are disseminated to the public through broadcast and online media outlets (including local television stations and The Weather Network/MétéoMédia), and Weatheradio Canada; depending on regional office discretion, the watch may require activation of the National Public Alerting System (Alert Ready) (French: Système national d'alertes à la population [En Alerte]) and feeding provincial alerting systems (such as Alberta Emergency Alert and SaskAlert) to distribute the alert to local broadcast media and cellular phones.

Tornado Watch #723 in East North Carolina
An example of a tornado watch alert using the new Broadcast Message Handler (BMH) Paul Voice, issued in East North Carolina counties on 18 December 2023 at 10:00 PM EST.

== See also ==
- Severe weather terminology (United States)
- Tornado Warning
- Severe Thunderstorm Watch
