= Korea Meteorological Administration =

Meteorological service of South Korea

- 기상청

Agency overview
- Formed: December 27, 1990; 35 years ago
- Superseding agency: Central Meteorological Office Korea Meteorological Service
- Jurisdiction: South Korea
- Headquarters: Seo District, Daejeon; 37.493764°N 126.917005°E
- Agency executives: Yoo Hee-dong, Director of Meteorological Agency; Jang Dong-eun, Vice Administrator of KMA
- Parent agency: Ministry of Environment
- Website: www.kma.go.kr

Korean name
- Hangul: 기상청
- Hanja: 氣象廳
- RR: Gisangcheong
- MR: Kisangch'ŏng

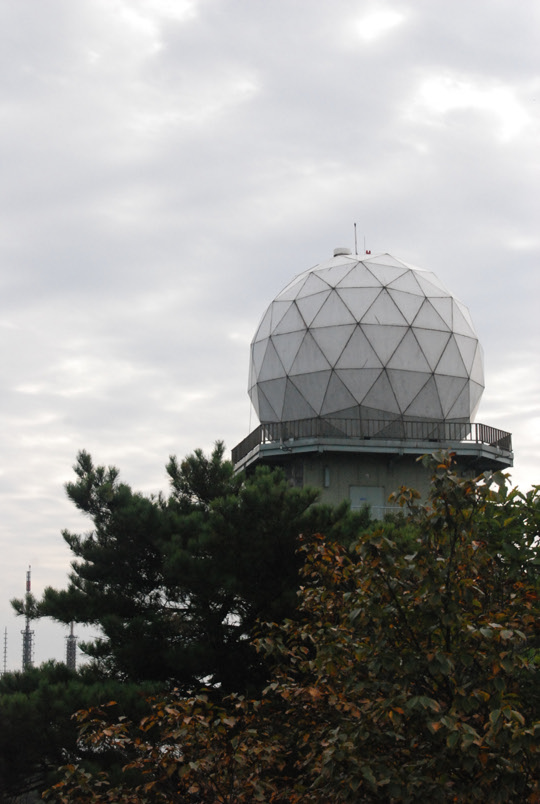
Korea Meteorological Administration - Gwanak Radar Observatory

The Korea Meteorological Administration (KMA; Korean: 기상청) is the national meteorological service of South Korea. The service started in 1904 joining the WMO in 1956. Numerical weather prediction is performed using the Unified Model software suite.

== History ==
The current administration was established in 1990. Temporary observatories set up in 1904 in Busan, Incheon, Mokpo and elsewhere were precursors to the current KMA. The Central Meteorological Office (국립중앙관상대, CMO) was established in August 1949. In April 1978, CMO was renamed the Korea Meteorological Service (KMS). In 1999, the administration introduced a meteorological supercomputer for forecasting. As of November 2021, supercomputers Guru and Maru ranked 27th and 28th respectively in the world. In 2010, the KMA launched South Korea's first geostationary meteorological satellite, the Communication, Ocean and Meteorological Satellite (COMS), also known as Chollian. Chollian started its official operation in 2011. The Seoul and Busan observatories were recognized as Centennial Observing Stations in 2017 by the World Meteorological Administration (WMO). In 2019, the administration completed developing its own numerical weather prediction model.

== Weather radar project ==
In 2013, US-based Enterprise Electronics Corporation (EEC) out of Enterprise, Alabama won a contract to deliver 11 S-band Klystron Dual-Polarization Doppler Weather radar systems to the KMA. The radars will be installed across the country as a means of providing for complete weather radar coverage over the entire country.

== Locations ==
The headquarters is in Daebang-dong, Dongjak District, Seoul. Co-working organs include mainly 5 categories: regional office of KMA, weather stations, observatories and Joint office for Meteorological observation.

== See also ==
- National Institute of Meteorological Sciences - national research institute for meteorology in South Korea
