= Servicio Meteorológico Nacional =

Servicio Meteorológico Nacional may refer to one of the following national weather services:

- Servicio Meteorológico Nacional (Argentina)
- Servicio Meteorológico Nacional (Mexico)

== See also ==
- National Weather Service (United States), known in Spanish as Servicio Nacional de Meteorología
- For a list of agencies with similar functions, see national meteorological services
