= TORNADO Act =

- Other short titles: TORNADO Act
- Long title: Tornado Observation Research Notification and Deployment to Operations (TORNADO) Act
- Announced in: the 118th United States Congress
- Sponsored by: Roger Wicker (R‑MS)
- Number of co-sponsors: 8

Codification
- Agencies affected: National Oceanic and Atmospheric Administration

Legislative history
- Introduced in the Senate by Roger Wicker (R–MS) on April 26, 2023

The bill introduced to the Senate in April 2023

The Tornado Observation Research Notification and Deployment to Operations Act, shortened to the TORNADO Act, was introduced by U.S. Senator Roger Wicker as well as eight other senators from the 118th United States Congress on April 26, 2023.

The act aims to increase the time from when a tornado warning is issued to when a tornado hits. The legislation aims to do so through forecasting and understanding, or by bettering communication and issuing.

== Background ==
This bill was introduced in the aftermath of two violent tornado outbreaks in 2023 (March 24–27 and March 31–April 1), which killed 57 people and injured nearly 400 others. One particularly violent tornado struck the town of Rolling Fork, Mississippi, with winds estimated at 195 miles per hour (314 km/h).

The National Weather Service was only able to give a 20-minute warning for the residents of Rolling Fork. Another driving force for the TORNADO Act was the March 5, 2022 Winterset EF4 tornado. Some thoughts of replacing the Enhanced Fujita scale were also made due to it being outdated. It died in Senate committee. It has since been reintroduced again, and has been sitting on the Senate Legislative calendar under General Orders since June 2025.

== Provisions ==
If the bill is passed, the NOAA would have to update its procedure in predicting and communicating a tornado warning. The bill would require the NOAA to submit an action plan for a high resolution tornado forecasting program, better cooperate with entities involving the warnings, and evaluate the Enhanced Fujita scale.
