= Gary England =

American meteorologist (1939–2025)

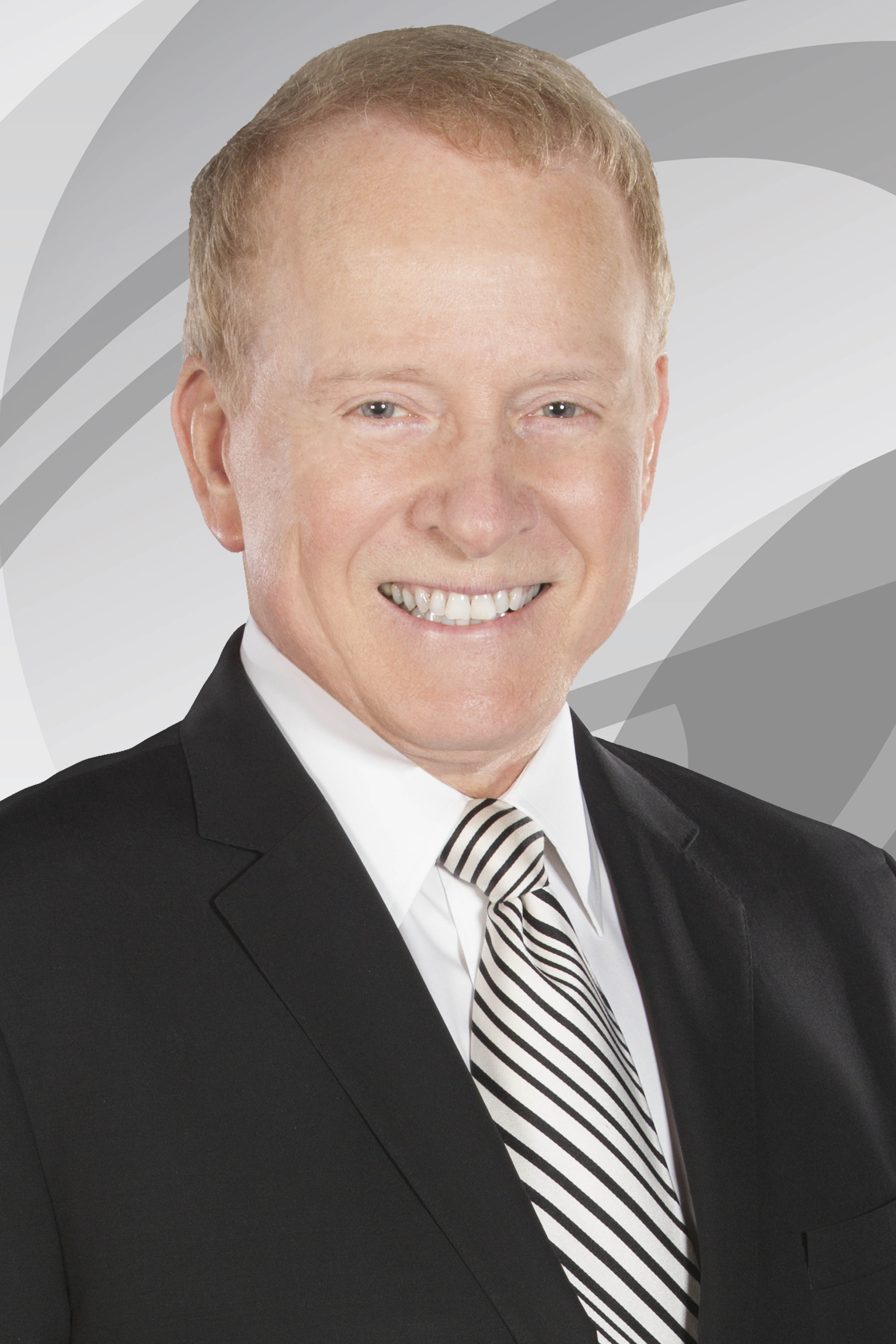
- England in 2010
- Born: October 3, 1939; Seiling, Oklahoma, U.S.
- Died: June 10, 2025 (aged 85); Oklahoma City, Oklahoma, U.S.
- Education: University of Oklahoma (B.S.)
- Occupations: Meteorologist; Television executive
- Employer: KWTV-DT parent company Griffin Communications LLC
- Known for: Tornado broadcasts and technological innovations
- Notable work: First Warning; Massive Output Array Radar (MOAR); World's first commercial Doppler Weather Radar; Storm Tracker (software); Pathfinder (Doppler Weather Radar Software); Storm Shield 9 (Doppler Weather Radar Software)
- Awards: 3 Emmy awards; National RTNDA Edward R. Murrow Award for breaking news/weather, 2009; Oklahoma Hall of Fame; Oklahoma Association of Broadcasters Hall of Fame; Governor's Humanitarian Award, 1999; Silver Circle Award

Gary Alan England (October 3, 1939 – June 10, 2025) was an American meteorologist based in Oklahoma. He became the chief meteorologist for KWTV-DT (channel 9), the CBS-affiliated television station in Oklahoma City, after he began working there in 1972. England was the first on-air meteorologist to alert his viewers of a possible tornado with a commercial Doppler weather radar. He was also known for contributing to the invention of the First Warning map graphic commonly used to show ongoing weather alerts without interrupting regular programming. He was also the Vice President of Corporate Relations and Weather Development at Griffin Communications LLC, the parent company to KWTV.

== Early life and career ==
Gary Alan England was born on October 3, 1939, in Seiling, Oklahoma. He lived in Enid but was mostly raised in the Seiling area. Despite being interested in pig farming at a young age, he developed an interest with the weather, especially after the 1947 Glazier–Higgins–Woodward tornadoes, which wiped out much of nearby Woodward. After graduating from high school, England joined the U.S. Navy at age 17, and also attended the University of Oklahoma and graduated in 1965 with a B.S. in mathematics and meteorology.

== Broadcasting career ==
During a live cut-in by England at Oklahoma City's KWTV on May 24, 1973, for a tornado warning in Canadian County, Channel 9 viewers saw the radar image of a damaging F4 tornado near Union City in Canadian County which resulted in extensive damage to that small town. The Union City tornado was also the first case in which the visual observations of chasers were used in conjunction with Doppler radar data; it also led to the improvement of lead times and general accuracy improvements to future tornado warnings.

England and the firm Enterprise Electronics Corporation were the first to implement commercial Doppler weather radar. England is credited with issuing the first televised Doppler weather radar bulletin for a tornado, in March 1982. This followed Gil Whitney of WHIO-TV's broadcast of the April 3, 1974, Xenia tornado using a conventional radar.

In 1990, he helped create First Warning, a state map which appeared in the corner of the television screen, with counties colored in to indicate storm watches and warnings. In 1991, England also helped create Storm Tracker, a computer program that provided the audience with the time of arrival of severe weather.

On July 23, 2013, KWTV announced that England would be leaving his position at KWTV to become Vice President for Corporate Relations and Weather Development for Griffin Communications, the parent company of KWTV-DT. England was to be succeeded by David Payne, and England's final day as KWTV head meteorologist would be August 30, 2013, giving his last forecast two days prior.

England is remembered as a calming presence, who spoke directly to children home alone during his televised tornado alerts.

== Other work ==
England had a cameo appearance (via KWTV's archives) during the opening scene and served as one of three 'weather announcers' in the 1996 movie Twister. England also appeared in the 2021 fantasy movie Iké Boys as a weatherman.

He appeared in over fifty national and international weather specials, and was inducted into the Oklahoma Hall of Fame.

In 1996 England wrote an autobiography titled "Weathering the Storm - Tornadoes, Television & Turmoil". A new biography of England by Bob Burke was published in December 2006 titled "Friday Night in the Big Town", named after England's tendency to open his Friday night broadcasts by stating "It's Friday night in the big town".

== Personal life and death ==
England was married to Mary (née Smith) England for 63 years. They had one daughter. England died in Oklahoma City on June 10, 2025, at the age of 85. He was in hospice care after he had a stroke three weeks prior.

== Awards ==
England won several awards and was recognized for his broadcasting of severe weather, including:

- Three Emmy awards
- National RTNDA Edward R. Murrow Award, 2009
- Governor's Humanitarian Award, 1999
- Silver Circle Award
- Oklahoma Hall of Fame
- Oklahoma Association of Broadcasters Hall of Fame

== Publications ==
- Weathering the Storm: Tornadoes, Television, and Turmoil. Norman, Oklahoma: University of Oklahoma Press. 1996. ISBN 0-8061-2823-2.

== See also ==
- List of meteorologists
