= First Warning =

Name of a severe weather warning system for television stations

First Warning is a severe weather warning system designed for broadcast television stations, typically those in the United States. A weather advisory product based on First Warning, called First Alert, is an automated version of this product, which has come into widespread use by television stations and is marketed under different names depending on the graphics service vendor.

Both products are typically used by television stations that have an in-house news and weather operation, although some television stations that do not broadcast news at all or have their newscasts produced by another station in their market may use the system as well.

== Overview ==
First Warning was created in 1990 by Gary England, then the chief meteorologist of CBS affiliate KWTV in Oklahoma City, Oklahoma (a city which historically has had the highest number of tornado strikes of any U.S. city since tornado records began to be logged in 1890), and went into use in the spring of 1991. The system was conceived to provide visual alerts for severe and winter weather as well as other hydrologic and non-hydrologic weather advisories to television viewers in a timely and convenient manner. The original version of this forecast product required manual input of weather alerts into the computer system by a meteorologist, with the specific advisory information, the counties/parishes listed in the alert and the advisory type.

ABC affiliate KOCO-TV, a market competitor to KWTV, created an automated version of this product called First Alert (a name the station has since used for its doppler radar system, now known as "Advantage Doppler HD", and which the station currently uses as its weather branding), in which the weather information is updated by the computer itself, delivered by communication routes wired to media outlets from the National Weather Service. Tornado sirens are also usually activated for the affected areas if present. and parses out additional text included in the alert product including the date and time of issuance, SAME county codes and other text coding that precedes and follows the main body of the alert product.

First Warning is commonly displayed on-air in the form of a map of an entire state or the specific counties representing a television station's viewing area (which may cover one or more states) with a list of the watches, warnings or advisories either displayed as a legend with colored text, in text beside a colored key or in text inside a colored line bar. Each watch, warning or advisory is assigned a color code and arranged in order of urgency (with tornado warnings being given the highest priority of all alerts). However, while virtually all First Warning systems may display the same color for severe thunderstorm watches (blue), severe thunderstorm warnings (yellow or orange), tornado watches (green) and tornado warnings (red), the color codes for other warnings or advisories may vary depending on the station (in some cases, the color code for one watch/warning/advisory may match that of another).

When a watch, warning or advisory (severe or non-severe) is disseminated by either the Storm Prediction Center (SPC) or a local National Weather Service Weather Forecast Office, a scroll with text moving right to left across the screen featuring information on the alert appears, usually accompanied by three (or six) brief bursts of a 1050 Hz attention signal. Although local offices of the National Weather Service have issued warnings for tornadoes and severe thunderstorms based on the path of a storm since October 2007, most stations using the system display the affected jurisdictions on a per-county basis rather than delineating them by polygons.

This system's on-air design element is stylized depending on the television station using it (for example, until an upgrade of its system to allow widescreen overlays during broadcasts of high definition programming in March 2009, Oklahoma City NBC affiliate KFOR-TV's 4WARN Storm Alert variant displayed an "L"-bar surrounding a resized box display of the current program, containing a map of all 77 Oklahoma counties and accompanying legend, along with the name of a specific county above it – the county referenced in the assigned warning/watch color on the map is shown blinking for three seconds – and a ticker on the upper third of the screen; a live display of the station's Doppler radar system replaced the alert map when the alert ticker scrolled the second time).

In some areas, the First Warning map is displayed on the top left or right portion of the screen to avoid obstructing the rest of the program or closed captions elsewhere on-screen (though the latter purpose is somewhat defeated by the fact that closed captions occasionally appear at the top of the screen, while in turn, the map may obstruct visual aspects of the program in its positioned area of the screen). The on-screen display is usually removed before the broadcast of a severe weather cut-in or commercial break; the length of time it is displayed may also be truncated if no significant weather is imminent in the viewing area.

Additional features were added to First Warning and its variants during the 2000s, including functions allowing the map to toggle between displays of current weather alerts and live or looped radar imagery, including radar images by individual county, which are often accompanied by warning information specific to the jurisdiction.

== Technical issues ==
As many television stations had not upgraded their master control infrastructures to allow high definition broadcasts of non-network programs or the hardware for the First Warning system to be compatible with HD broadcasts prior to the late 2000s and early 2010s, the high definition program feed would often be downconverted to standard definition when the map/ticker graphic was displayed. Although many stations have upgraded to HD-compatible versions of First Warning, the on-screen graphic map and/or scroll in some cases, may be displayed in anamorphic widescreen if the system is not properly set to a 16:9 display, causing partial cropping of the graphic outside of the safe area on 4:3 television sets.

== See also ==
- Emergency Alert System
- National Weather Service
- NOAA Weather Radio
- Severe weather
- Severe weather terminology (United States)
