= 2021 Australian federal budget =

Australian federal budget 2021
- Submitted: 11 May 2021
- Submitted by: Morrison government
- Submitted to: House of Representatives
- Parliament: 45th
- Party: Liberal/National Coalition
- Treasurer: Josh Frydenberg
- Total revenue: $596.4 billion (26.0 % of GDP)
- Program Spending: $623.0 billion
- Deficit: $32.0 billion (1.4% of GDP)
- Website: budget.gov.au

The 2021 Australian federal budget was the federal budget to fund government services and operations for the 2021–22 financial year. The budget was presented to the House of Representatives by Treasurer Josh Frydenberg on 11 May 2021. It was the eighth budget to be handed down by the Liberal/National Coalition since their election to government at the 2013 federal election, and the third budget to be handed down by Frydenberg and the Morrison government. This budget was the second last to be handed down by the Morrison government before their defeat at the 2022 Australian federal election, with the last being the March 2022 budget.

== Background ==
This budget was handed down during the COVID-19 pandemic, and as such included further and ongoing measures for the recovery of the economy.

== Debt and deficit ==
The underlying cash deficit for 2021–22 was $32.0 billion, falling from $134.2 billion in 2020–21.

The final gross debt outcome was $895.3 billion.

== See also ==
- Australian government debt
- Economy of Australia
- Taxation in Australia
