= National meteorological service =

Government agency responsible for weather forecasting

A national meteorological service or national meteorological and hydrological service is a type of government agency in charge of each country's meteorological or hydrological matters, especially on missions like weather observation, data collection and monitoring, forecasting, and issuing warnings and alerts for natural hazards like floods and storms. Such agencies may use names like meteorological administration, meteorological agency, meteorological service, weather bureau, or weather service.

== International history ==
As meteorological services usually have tendency of becoming a natural monopoly, almost all of national meteorological services were launched by state-led public institution, funded exclusively by government. However, the trend has changed in late 20th century, as more and more governments were trying to push national meteorological service to cut the cost and raise own revenue. It created serious worries in World Meteorological Organization, an international association of national meteorological services. Change of global trend resulted wide variation in operating models of each country's national meteorological service, such as small division unit inside executive department or ministry, independent government agency, public body, state-owned enterprise, and privatized enterprise. The varied status of each nation's meteorological service created some confusion in development of climate services.

== By country ==
- Servicio Meteorológico Nacional (Argentina)
- Meteorological Service of Canada
- Meteorological Service of Catalonia, in Spain
- China Meteorological Administration
  - National Meteorological Center of CMA
- Finnish Meteorological Institute
- Korea Meteorological Administration, in South Korea
- Japan Meteorological Agency
- Meteorological Service of Jamaica
- India Meteorological Department
- Malaysian Meteorological Department
- Servicio Meteorológico Nacional (Mexico)
- MetService, in New Zealand
- Nepal Meteorological Department (NMD) Nepal | (Former: Department of Hydrology and Meteorology (DHM), Reformed 2026)
- Pakistan Meteorological Department
- Hydrometeorological Centre of Russia, founded as Meteorological Service of the Russian Soviet Federative Socialist Republic
- Meteorological Service Singapore
- State Meteorological Agency, in Spain
- Central Weather Administration, in Taiwan
- Met Office, in the United Kingdom
- National Weather Service, in the United States
  - National Oceanic and Atmospheric Administration
  - Air Force Weather Agency
- Ukrainian Hydrometeorological Center

== See also ==
- Climate Information Service
- List of meteorology institutions
- Weather forecasting
- World Meteorological Organization
