= Enterprise Electronics Corporation =

American commercial weather radar system company

- Founded: 1971 in Enterprise, Alabama, United States
- Headquarters: Enterprise, Alabama, United States
- Area served: Worldwide
- Products: Weather radars and satellite ground stations

Enterprise Electronics Corporation or EEC is an Alabama-based commercial weather radar system company, founded in 1971. EEC has designed and manufactured over 1,000 weather radar systems for over 90 countries. EEC offers S Band, C Band, and X Band options commercially. In 2013, EEC expanded its product line offering by acquiring the weather satellite ground station division from the Australia-based Environmental Systems & Services Pty Ltd company (ES&S).

== History ==
Founded by a group of radar engineers in 1971, EEC made its public debut in 1972 with the WR-100-3 radar. One was installed at WKY TV (now KFOR) in Oklahoma. The WSR-100-5 was installed at the same station in 1974. In 1975, the production of the WSR-74 line of radars, mostly C-band, began.

It produced cavity magnetron and klystron commercial S and C-Band weather radars began. Also in 1974, EEC was selected by the US National Weather Service to deliver 160 WSR-74 radar systems to replace the older models across the country. Following this, EEC expanded its operations, becoming a commonly consulted private radar company for media radars. Today, EEC is the only commercial weather radar vendor in the US to offer a complete line of magnetron, klystron and solid-state transmitter weather radar systems.

Additionally, EEC's TeleSpace business division offers direct readout ground station systems, which support the full constellation of both Geostationary Orbit and Polar Orbit weather satellites. In 2016–2017, EEC's TeleSpace division delivered the first-ever commercial GOES-16 ground station (Capella-GR) systems into North, Central, and South America.

== Innovations ==
EEC, given frequent use by commercial media corporations, has had several instances of innovation within the company.

- 1972 – First commercial weather radar on the market (WSR-100)
- 1975 – First Digital Video Integrator Processor (DVIP)
- 1980 – First Digital signal processor
- 1981 – First commercial Doppler weather radar delivered to a TV station (commissioned by Gary England of KWTV-DT in Oklahoma City, OK)
- 1988 – First Personal Computer-based radar display system was unveiled
- 2012 – First commercially available solid-state X-Band radar system unveiled
- 2014 – First operational Circular Depolarization Ratio (CDR) solution unveiled
- 2016 – First operational deployment of mobile, solid-state, dual-polarization X-Band radars to a TV station/network of stations in the US
- 2018 – First commercial weather radar systems provider to win a Technology & Engineering Emmy Award for television in the US (StormRanger)
