= Multicellular thunderstorm =

Thunderstorm composed of multiple storm cells

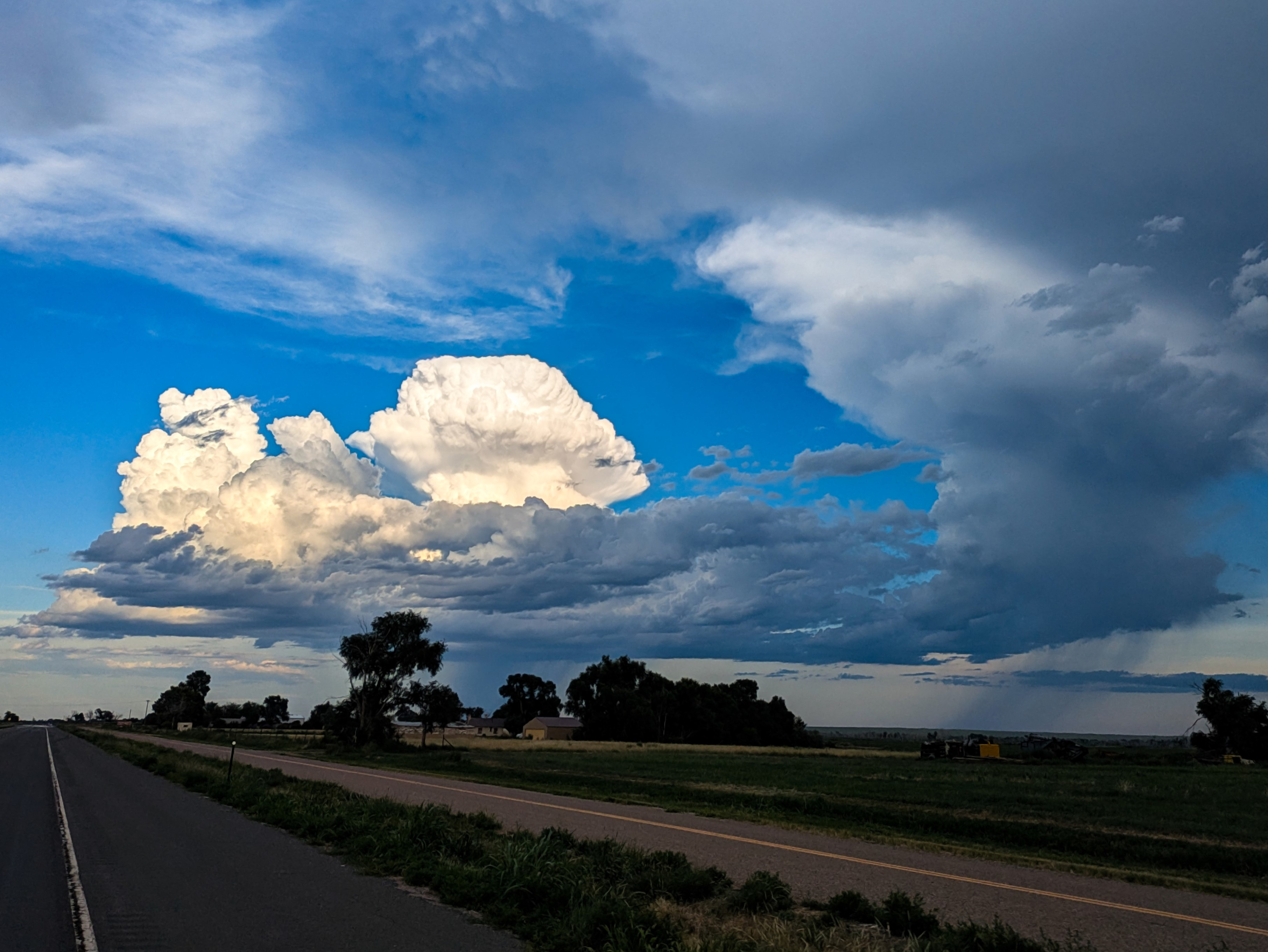
- Photo of a multicellular thunderstorm.
- Abbreviation: Cb
- Genus: Cumulonimbus
- Altitude: 500-16,000 m (2,000-52,000 ft)
- Classification: Family D (Vertically developed)
- Appearance: Multiple convective towers at different stages of life.
- Precipitation: Rain or hail, heavy at times

A multicellular thunderstorm cluster is a thunderstorm that is composed of multiple convective cells, each being at a different stage in the life cycle of a thunderstorm. It appears as several anvils clustered together. A cell is an updraft/downdraft couplet. These different cells will dissipate as new cells form and continue the life of the multicellular thunderstorm cluster with each cell taking a turn as the dominant cell in the group.

== Description ==
Life cycle of a multicellar cluster.

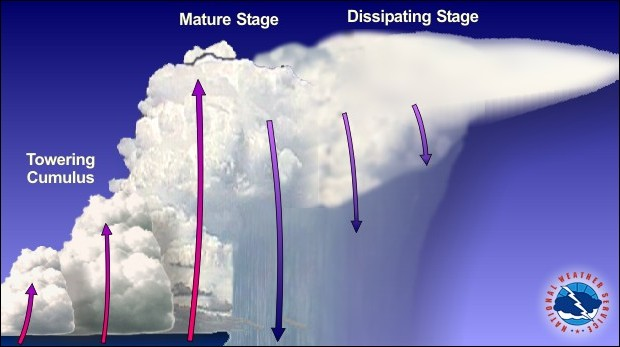
Photo of the multicellular structure.

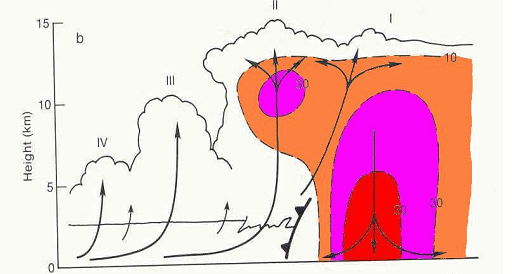
Radar reflectivity in the clouds and arrow showing the vertical motion.

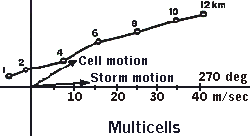
Typical multicellular thunderstorm hodograph.

The formation of multicellular thunderstorms imply that the updraft in the mother thunderstorm is offset from its downdraft. New cells usually form in the upwind (usually western or southwestern) part of the storm where the downdrafts of the mature cells meet the environmental wind, lifting air parcels and triggering new convection. The mature cells are thus usually in the center of the storm, and dissipating cells are usually in the downwind (usually eastern or northeastern) part of the storm.

=== Characteristics ===
The multicellular cluster can last for hours while each individual cell should only last for about 20 to 60 minutes. These storms can sometimes be severe and sometimes have awkward paths due to the thunderstorm sometimes not following the path of the cells that compose it. The typical hodograph, plot of the wind versus altitude, associated with it shows a linear wind shear with altitude The moderate vertical wind shear leads to the development of a non-symmetric surface convergence associated with the thunderstorm outflow, with the strongest convergence taking place on the downwind side from the storm's motion. So while individual cells move along the windshear, the line moves at 30° of it, at 70% of the mean wind speed in the layer.

The Convective available potential energy (CAPE) is moderate to large, usually between 800 and 1,500 J/kg. The radar structure of this type of thunderstorm is characterized by overhangs of reflectivity in the southwestern part of the cluster.

== Threats ==
Any severe activity in one of these storms will most likely come from the dominant cell near or after its peak updraft strength. This is because there could be severe hail from a strong updraft that lasts only a short period of time, with damaging winds.

Rain is an important impact of such systems. The speed and direction at which the entire cluster of thunderstorms move downstream make the difference in the amount of rain received in any one location. Individual cells might move downstream but additional cells forming upwind of the cluster can move directly over the path of the previous cell, forming training echoes.

A multicellular storm can sometimes develop into a mesoscale convective system (MCS) or be a squall line. Updrafts reform new cells continually at the leading edge of system with rain and hail following behind. Individual thunderstorm updrafts and downdrafts along the line can become strong, producing large hail and strong outflow of straight-line winds ahead of system. Tornadoes are only occasionally reported. In certain conditions, squall line can extend on a very long line, moving extremely rapidly, and become a derecho.

== See also ==
- Pulse storm
- Supercell
