= Meteorological Service of Jamaica =

Agency overview
- Jurisdiction: Jamaica
- Agency executives: Evan Thompson, Principal Director; Lisa Wright, Support Services Manager; Rohan Brown, Weather Services Manager; Jacqueline Spence-Hemmings, Climate Services Manager
- Parent department: Ministry of Economic Growth and Job Creation
- Website: https://metservice.gov.jm/

The Meteorological Service of Jamaica, commonly known as the Met Service, is the government agency responsible for monitoring and tracking weather and climate in Jamaica, forecasting, warnings about weather events such as hurricanes, and aviation/marine services.

The Met Service is a branch of the Ministry of Economic Growth and Job Creation.

== History ==
=== 1940s–1950s ===
Until the 1940s, meteorological matters in Jamaica were coordinated by a "Government Meteorologist", whose chief tasks were the collection and publication of meteorological data such as rainfall, temperature, etc. During the 1940s, a formal meteorological service was developed as an adjunct of the British Government's Air Ministry. This was during World War II and meteorological activities were expanded to include synoptic weather forecasting, particularly for aviation and marine interests.

=== 1950s–1962 ===
The early 1950s saw the establishment of the British Caribbean Meteorological Service in 1951, which unified meteorological activities of the British Caribbean colonies including Jamaica. It was later taken over by the West Indies Meteorological Service (WIMS) with headquarters in Trinidad and Tobago.

=== Since 1962 ===
Upon independence in 1962, Jamaica became a member state of the World Meteorological Organization, a United Nations specialized agency. Throughout the wider Caribbean, the WIMS was superseded by the Caribbean Meteorological Service which was established on 1 January 1963. The Bahamas withdrew from the Service a year later. The Service itself would be later transformed into the Caribbean Meteorological Organization (CMO) in 1973.

== Leadership and Structure ==
The Met Service is composed of three distinct Services: Weather, Climate, and Support, all overseen by the Principal Director who, as of October 2025, is Evan Thompson. Each service is led by a manager responsible for its respective operational area.
