= Standard Emergency Warning Signal =

Emergency population warning system used in Australia

- Type: Emergency warning and notification system
- Branding: Standard Emergency Warning Signal
- Country: Australia
- Launch date: 1970s
- Dissolved: 1 October 2026; 0 days' time (Cell Broadcast features)
- Broadcast: All terrestrial radio and television broadcasters, text messaging to mobile telephones, auto-dialling to landline telephones
- Replaced by: AusAlert (Cell Broadcast features)

Standard Emergency Warning Signal tone

The Standard Emergency Warning Signal (SEWS) is a warning siren used in Australia to alert the public of danger. The siren is played over radio, television or public address systems in public places to warn of bushfire, flood, cyclone, tsunami, earthquake or terrorist attack.

The SEWS forms part of the "Australia's Emergency Warning Arrangements". The framework guides states and the Commonwealth in the use of the signal.

== Introduction ==
Following Cyclone Ada in 1970, there was a call for a national plan to deal with disasters, given "inexcusable delays associated with the public warning of the path of this cyclone".

The SEWS was developed by the Bureau of Meteorology in the 1970s for tropical cyclone warnings, and was broadcast on radios and televisions. The idea was proposed in 1975 that, in conjunction with the alert tone, the warnings themselves should be given in the local language where relevant, such as pidgin in the Torres Strait. In November 1976, it was mentioned the cyclone warnings and the siren broadcasts were affecting tourism in Queensland. Following the 1977 Royal Commission on Australia Government Administration, cyclone warnings were still considered the Bureau of Meteorology's highest priority. The alert was even incorporated into fiction reading.

== National signal adoption ==
It was adopted as a national emergency warning signal on 21 May 1995. Its use must be authorised, cannot be used for advertising.

== Telephone alerting ==
In 2009 the Emergency Alert system was established, as a location-based SMS (LB-SMS) system. It sends standard text messages from the telephone number 0444 444 444 with information about a potential emergency, and sends a phone call to landlines which starts with the SEWS tone, the words "Emergency! Emergency!", a message regarding the threat, and a phone number and/or website with more information.

The system was used in the 2019–20 Black Summer Bushfires, with 492,938 landline calls and 4,194,576 text messages sent to residents in affected areas. By 2026 it was estimated that the Emergency Alert system has been used on more than 2250 occasions, and has generated almost 70 million messages.

The 2020 Royal Commission into National Natural Disaster Arrangements ("Bushfires Royal Commission") found limitations in the Emergency Alert system, and recommended adoption of improved technologies for mobile telephones. AusAlert is planned to be introduced in late 2026 to provide warnings via mobile phone broadcast. It will use a different tone.
