= Pulse storm =

Thunderstorm that produces severe weather for short periods

A pulse storm is a single cell thunderstorm of substantial intensity which only produces severe weather for short periods of time. Such a storm weakens and then generates another short burst – hence "pulse". The term was coined by researchers at the National Severe Storms Laboratory in 1979 to describe a single storm cell briefly becoming severe within a cluster of multi-cellular thunderstorms, but has since been used to describe a variety of isolated and brief thunderstorms with both severe and non-severe characteristics.

== Description ==
Single cell thunderstorms ordinarily form in environments with low wind shear and moderate instability, with the low wind shear contributing to a short average lifespan of less than an hour. When the instability, calculated by convective available potential energy (CAPE), is strong, the updraft will bring a larger amount of humid air very high above ground and generate a cumulonimbus cloud with high water and ice content. When the rain content, and even hail, falls from it, they can generate damaging winds brought about by downbursts. Rarely, a weak tornado develops in association with a pulse storm as the environment is only weakly sheared, or not at all.

== Life cycle ==
Life cycle of a pulse storm.

One can distinguish three stages in the evolution of a pulse storm:

- Formation: the upward current of the cell intensifies and allows the condensation of water vapor from the rising air parcel. This forms a cumulus congestus or a towering cumulus, then a cumulonimbus when ice crystals form at its apex which spreads horizontally in contact with the tropopause.
- Maturity: downdrafts are emerging. This stage is accompanied by characteristic phenomena such as lightning and thunder, showers, and gust front.
- Dissipation: the cold pool descending from the cloud extends to the Earth's surface and helps to block the feed by pushing the updraft downstream. The outflow can then serve as a trigger for other single cell or even multi-cell thunderstorms to develop because the Outflow boundary is a lifting mechanism for updrafts because it can force more warm humid air into the atmosphere.

== See also ==
- Project NIMROD
