= Emergency Cell Broadcast System =

Emergency population warning system used in the Philippines

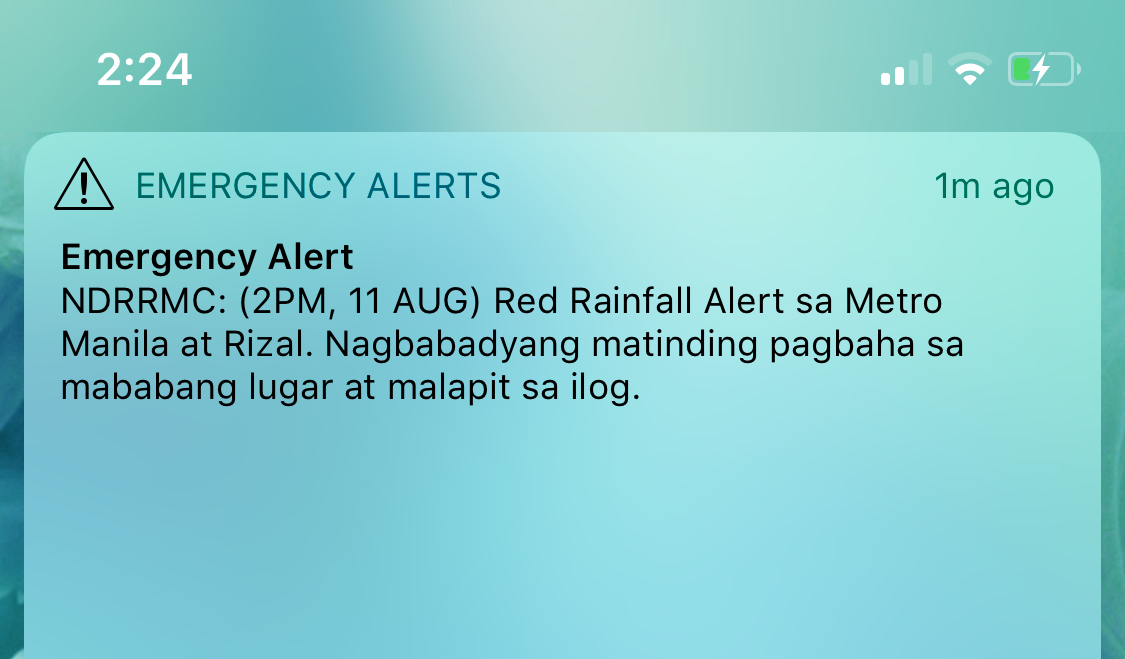
An Emergency Cell Broadcast on an iOS smartphone in Filipino, indicating a Heavy Rainfall Warning in Metro Manila and nearby Rizal province.

Emergency Cell Broadcast System (ECBS) is an alert broadcast system in the Philippines, designed to disseminate emergency alerts and warnings to mobile devices via cell broadcast services (CBS).

Telecommunications companies and the National Disaster Risk Reduction and Management Council (NDRRMC) are both mandated and required by law to send free mobile alerts before disasters happen.

== Background ==
The alert broadcast system was implemented in compliance with the Republic Act 10639, also known as the Free Mobile Disaster Alerts Act. The legislation was signed on June 20, 2014 and its implementing rules and regulations (IRR) were released on July 21, 2015. Initially only SMS or text messages were used to alert the public regarding emergencies and disasters.

The Emergency Cell Broadcast System (ECBS) was launched on March 13, 2017, by the National Disaster Risk Reduction and Management Council and Smart Communications.

== Information transmission capabilities ==
- Critical information that affected communities can use to prepare for and respond to disasters
- Contact information of authorities and responders in affected areas
- Information on evacuation centers, relief sites, and pick-up points
- Up-to-date information provided by state weather bureau PAGASA, the Philippine Institute of Volcanology and Seismology (PhiVolcs), and NDRRMC

== Mechanism ==
Emergency alerts disseminated through this system are crafted by the National Disaster Risk Reduction and Management Council with inputs from other government agencies. The NDRRMC is limited on the number of characters it can use for each emergency alert message. A computer program made for the system is used to create and send the message.

The system is location-specific, meaning a message is sent by designating an area where mobile phones within it shall receive the emergency alert. In contrast, the SMS-based emergency alert broadcast system is sent to devices through their mobile phone numbers which meant that the NDDRMC had to send emergency alert messages through telecommunications service providers. The process of the SMS-based system could take hours.

== Incidents ==
On April 3, 2025, it was reported in Masbate City that at 10:45 am local time, residents began receiving emergency alerts. These false alerts promoted members of the Kho family ahead of the 2025 Philippine general election. The nation's two largest telecommunication providers denied any wrongdoing, and the incident is being investigated by the National Telecommunications Commission.

== See also ==
- Early warning system
- Emergency communication system
- Emergency population warning broadcasting
