= Storm cell =

Air mass with up and down drafts in consecutive loops as a single entity

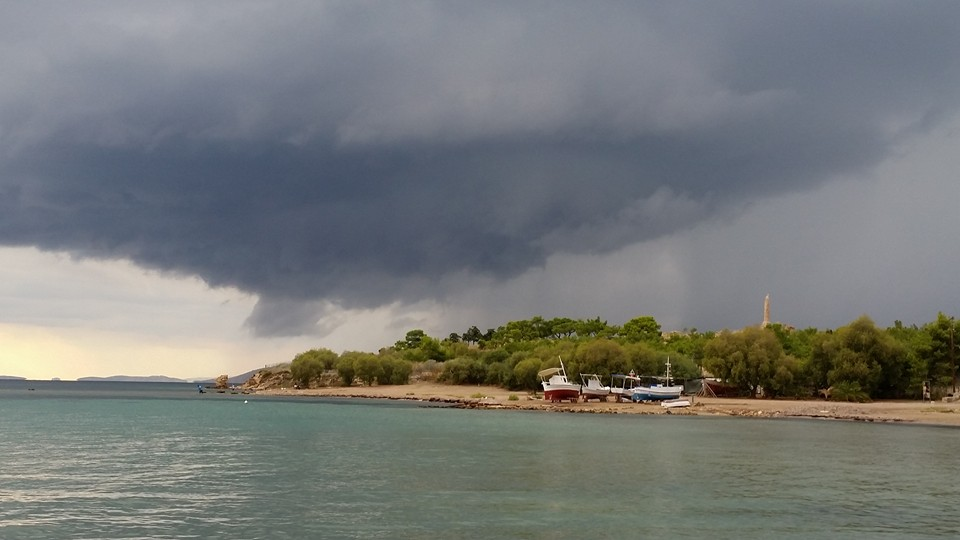
Storm cell over Aegina, Greece

A storm cell is an air mass that contains up and down drafts in convective loops and that moves and reacts as a single entity, functioning as the smallest unit of a storm-producing system. An organized grouping of thunder clouds will thus be considered as a series of storm cells with their up/downdrafts being independent or interfering one with the other.

== Characteristics ==
A storm cell can extend over an area the size of a few tens of square miles/kilometers and last 30 minutes or so. When the updraft and the environmental wind shear is well coordinated, the size and the duration of the cell can be much greater leading to a supercell. Finally, storm cells can form on the outflow of previous cells leading to multicellular thunderstorms or mesoscale convective systems. Slow motion of these more intense storm cells or groups of cells can produce large precipitation accumulations and flash flood, or other dangerous phenomena like hail and tornadoes.

== Life cycle ==
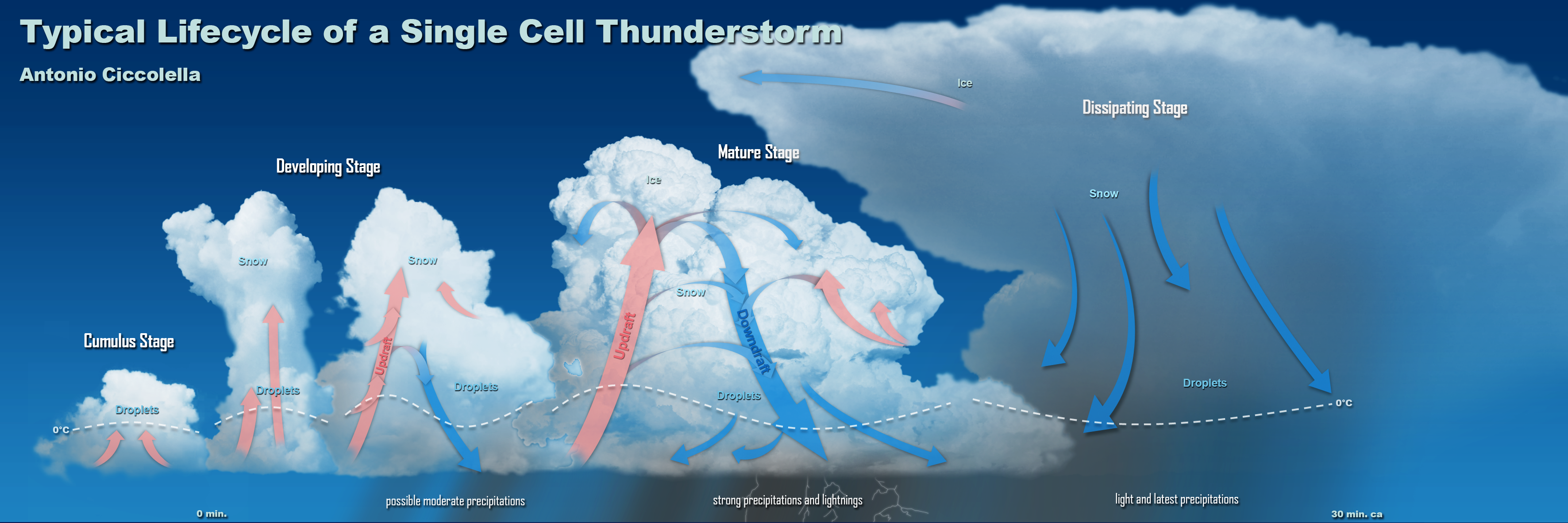
Life cycle of a single thunderstorm cell

One can distinguish three stages in the evolution of a thunderstorm cell:

- Formation: The upward current of the cell intensifies and allows the condensation of water vapor from the rising air parcel. This forms a cumulus congestus, then a cumulonimbus when ice crystals form at its apex which spreads horizontally in contact with the tropopause.
- Maturity: Downdrafts are emerging. This stage is accompanied by characteristic phenomena such as lightning and thunder, showers (sometimes hail) and gust front.
- Dissipation: The cold pool descending from the cloud extends to the earth's surface and helps to block the feed by pushing the updraft downstream.

== See also ==
- Pulse storm
- Supercell
- Multicellular thunderstorm
