= Advanced Weather Interactive Processing System =

Weather forecasting tool

AWIPS
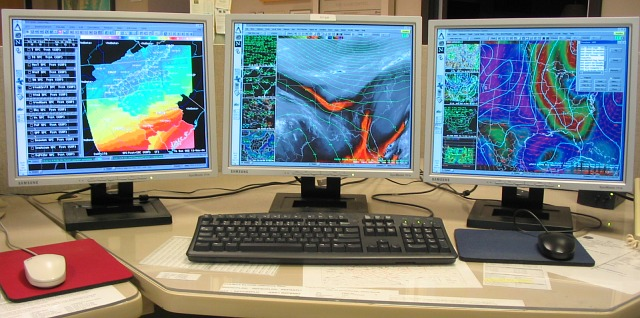
- AWIPS graphics workstation.
- Developer(s): Northrop Grumman Information Technology; Raytheon
- Initial release: 1998; 27 years ago
- Stable release: AWIPS II / 2011; 14 years ago
- Written in: UNIX/Linux

The Advanced Weather Interactive Processing System (AWIPS) is a technologically advanced processing, display, and telecommunications system that is the cornerstone of the United States National Weather Service's (NWS) operations.

AWIPS is a complex network of systems that ingests and integrates meteorological, hydrological, satellite, and radar data, and also processes and distributes the data to 135 Weather Forecast Offices (WFOs) and River Forecast Centers (RFCs) nationwide. Weather forecasters utilize the capabilities of AWIPS to make increasingly accurate weather, water, and climate predictions, and to dispense rapid, highly reliable warnings and advisories.

The AWIPS system architectural design is driven by expandability, flexibility, availability, and portability. The system is easily expandable to allow for the introduction of new functionality and the augmentation of network and processing capabilities. AWIPS is designed so that software and data can be migrated to new platforms as technology evolves.

== History ==
AWIPS replaced the Automation of Field Operations and Services (AFOS) system which had become obsolete and was very difficult to maintain. AWIPS was originally developed and maintained by PRC, Inc (later acquired by Northrop Grumman Information Technology) with installation completed in 1998.

Since 2005, Raytheon has been NWS’ partner for the operations, maintenance and evolution of AWIPS, providing the integrated mission services required to sustain and enhance system performance. It is a five-year contract with five one-year award terms for a potential maximum 10-year contract.

Teaming with Raytheon are Keane Federal Systems, Globecomm Systems Inc., GTSI Corp., ENSCO, Reston Consulting Group, Fairfield Technologies, Centuria Corporation, and Earth Resources Technology. Together they provide software operations and maintenance, software development, hardware maintenance and logistics, commercial off-the-shelf software maintenance, satellite communications, and network monitoring and control.

== Evolution ==
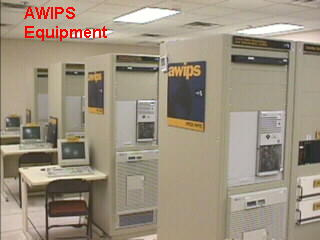
AWIPS equipment.

As the architect of the AWIPS evolution, Raytheon designed, developed, and released the system's next-generation software known as AWIPS II. AWIPS II, which features a new service oriented architecture (SOA) began roll-out in late 2011. This new system simplified code and consequently strengthened system performance while reducing the maintenance burden. All of this is achieved while retaining a system look and feel that makes the AWIPS evolution appear similar to the user.

The AWIPS program office is working in conjunction with the National Centers for Environmental Prediction (NCEP) to incorporate the NAWIPS baseline software used by the NCEP centers, National Hurricane Center (NHC) / Aviation Weather Center (AWC) / Storm Prediction Center (SPC) as well as the Weather Prediction Center (formerly Hydrometeorological Prediction Center) and Ocean Prediction Center (WPC and OPC) into the AWIPS II baseline. The commissioning of a new AWIPS site, the first since the Huntsville Weather Forecast Office in 2002, will also be part of this effort at the Space Weather Prediction Center (SWPC) in Boulder, CO.

== See also ==
- First Warning, a computer-based alerting system used to disseminate watches, warnings and advisories via broadcast television.
