= Evacuation immediate =

United States emergency warning

Evacuation immediate (SAME code: EVI) is a warning issued through the Emergency Alert System (EAS) in the United States to notify the public of a mandatory evacuation due to a wildfire, approaching hurricane/Typhoon, or an imminent explosion due to a gas leak or other hazards. It is typically issued by a local or state authority and is relayed by the National Weather Service. The warning can replace a Civil Emergency Message, Fire Warning, or other warnings when required.

Weather radio receivers, EAS Equipment boxes, and TV scrolls will display EVI alerts as immediate evacuation, and any text-to-speech voices from the EAS boxes will read the alert as "immediate evacuation" rather than "evacuation immediate".

== Example of a NWS issued evacuation immediate ==
MNC135-281944-

BULLETIN - EAS ACTIVATION REQUESTED
Evacuation Immediate
MN Roseau County
Relayed by National Weather Service Grand Forks ND
844 AM CDT Sat Mar 28 2026

...Train Derailment...

The following message is transmitted at the request of MN Roseau
County.

A train has derailed nearby with a possible unknown leak.
Residents are advised to evacuate as a precaution.

Patch Motel meeting point.  Please follow direction from 1st
responders.

&&

LAT...LON 4900 9537 4896 9535 4896 9536 4896 9536
      4900 9538

$$

2431331057281693/Roseau County Emergency Mangement
