= List of U.S. state and territory abbreviations =

Several sets of codes and abbreviations are used to represent the political divisions of the United States for postal addresses, data processing, general abbreviations, and other purposes.

== Table ==
This table includes abbreviations for three independent countries related to the United States through Compacts of Free Association, and other comparable postal abbreviations, including those now obsolete.

Legend
Code	Description
ISO	ISO 3166 codes (2-letter, 3-letter, and 3-digit codes from ISO 3166-1; 2+2-letter codes from ISO 3166-2)
ANSI	2-digit codes from the ANSI standard INCITS 38:2009 (supersedes FIPS 5-2)
USPS	2-letter codes used by the United States Postal Service and ANSI INCITS 38:2009 (bold red text shows differences between USPS and ANSI)
USCG	2-letter codes used by the United States Coast Guard (bold red text shows differences between ANSI and USCG)
GPO	Older variable-length official US Government Printing Office abbreviations
AP	Abbreviations from the AP Stylebook (bold red text shows differences between GPO and AP)
Court	Abbreviations used by the United States federal judiciary system

Codes and abbreviations for U.S. states, federal district, territories, and other regions
Name	Status of region	ISO	ANSI	USPS	USCG	GPO	AP	Court	Others
United States of America	Federal state	US; USA; 840	00	US		U.S.			U.S.A.
Alabama	State	US-AL	01	AL		Ala.			
Alaska	State	US-AK	02	AK		Alaska			Ak.
Arizona	State	US-AZ	04	AZ		Ariz.			
Arkansas	State	US-AR	05	AR		Ark.			
California	State	US-CA	06	CA	CF	Calif.		Cal.	Cal.
Colorado	State	US-CO	08	CO	CL	Colo.			
Connecticut	State	US-CT	09	CT		Conn.			
Delaware	State	US-DE	10	DE	DL	Del.			
District of Columbia	Federal district	US-DC	11	DC		D.C.			Dis. Col.
Florida	State	US-FL	12	FL		Fla.			
Georgia	State	US-GA	13	GA		Ga.			Geo.
Hawaii	State	US-HI	15	HI	HA	Hawaii		Haw.	Hi.; Haw.
Idaho	State	US-ID	16	ID		Idaho			Ida.
Illinois	State	US-IL	17	IL		Ill.			
Indiana	State	US-IN	18	IN		Ind.			
Iowa	State	US-IA	19	IA		Iowa			Ioa. (Note: "Ioa." or (more typically) "IOA" found in Iowa post office cancellations from the 1870s.)
Kansas	State	US-KS	20	KS	KA	Kans.	Kan.	Kan.	Ka.
Kentucky	State	US-KY	21	KY		Ky.			Ken., Kent.
Louisiana	State	US-LA	22	LA		La.			
Maine	State	US-ME	23	ME		Maine		Me.	
Maryland	State	US-MD	24	MD		Md.			Mar., Mary.
Massachusetts	State	US-MA	25	MA	MS	Mass.			
Michigan	State	US-MI	26	MI	MC	Mich.			
Minnesota	State	US-MN	27	MN		Minn.			
Mississippi	State	US-MS	28	MS	MI	Miss.			
Missouri	State	US-MO	29	MO		Mo.			
Montana	State	US-MT	30	MT		Mont.			
Nebraska	State	US-NE	31	NE	NB	Nebr.	Neb.		
Nevada	State	US-NV	32	NV		Nev.			
New Hampshire	State	US-NH	33	NH		N.H.			
New Jersey	State	US-NJ	34	NJ		N.J.			N. Jersey
New Mexico	State	US-NM	35	NM		N. Mex.	N.M.		New M., New Mex.
New York	State	US-NY	36	NY		N.Y.			N. York
North Carolina	State	US-NC	37	NC		N.C.			N. Car.
North Dakota	State	US-ND	38	ND		N. Dak.	N.D.		
Ohio	State	US-OH	39	OH		Ohio			O., Oh.
Oklahoma	State	US-OK	40	OK		Okla.			
Oregon	State	US-OR	41	OR		Oreg.	Ore.	Or.	
Pennsylvania	State	US-PA	42	PA		Pa.			Penn., Penna.
Rhode Island	State	US-RI	44	RI		R.I.			R.I. & P.P.
South Carolina	State	US-SC	45	SC		S.C.			S. Car.
South Dakota	State	US-SD	46	SD		S. Dak.	S.D.		SoDak
Tennessee	State	US-TN	47	TN		Tenn.			
Texas	State	US-TX	48	TX		Tex.	Texas	Tex.	
Utah	State	US-UT	49	UT		Utah			Ut.
Vermont	State	US-VT	50	VT		Vt.			Verm.
Virginia	State	US-VA	51	VA		Va.			Virg.
Washington	State	US-WA	53	WA	WN	Wash.			Wn.
West Virginia	State	US-WV	54	WV		W. Va.	W.Va.	W. Va.	W.V., W. Virg.
Wisconsin	State	US-WI	55	WI	WS	Wis.			Wisc.
Wyoming	State	US-WY	56	WY		Wyo.			
American Samoa	Insular area (Territory)	AS; ASM; 016; US-AS	60	AS		A.S.			
Guam	Insular area (Territory)	GU; GUM; 316; US-GU	66	GU		Guam		Guam	
Northern Mariana Islands	Insular area (Commonwealth)	MP; MNP; 580; US-MP	69	MP	CM	M.P.		N. Mar. I.	CNMI
Puerto Rico	Insular area (Commonwealth)	PR; PRI; 630; US-PR	72	PR		P.R.		P.R.	
U.S. Virgin Islands	Insular area (Territory)	VI; VIR; 850; US-VI	78	VI		V.I.		V.I.	U.S.V.I.
U.S. Minor Outlying Islands	Insular areas	UM; UMI; 581; US-UM	74	UM					
Baker Island	Island	UM-81	81					XB	
Howland Island	Island	UM-84	84					XH	
Jarvis Island	Island	UM-86	86					XQ	
Johnston Atoll	Atoll	UM-67	67					XU	
Kingman Reef	Atoll	UM-89	89					XM	
Midway Atoll	Atoll	UM-71	71					QM	
Navassa Island	Island	UM-76	76					XV	
Palmyra Atoll (Note: The Palmyra Atoll is an unorganized incorporated territory of the United States that was previously a part of the Territory of Hawaii.)	Atoll	UM-95	95					XL	
Wake Island	Atoll	UM-79	79					QW	
Marshall Islands	Freely associated state	MH; MHL; 584	68	MH					
Micronesia	Freely associated state	FM; FSM; 583	64	FM					
Palau	Freely associated state	PW; PLW; 585	70	PW					
U.S. Armed Forces – Americas (Note: The U.S. Armed Forces – Americas include the Caribbean Sea and exclude the United States, Canada, and Greenland.)	US military mail code			AA					
U.S. Armed Forces – Europe (Note: The U.S. Armed Forces – Europe include the Atlantic Ocean, the Mediterranean Sea, Canada, Greenland, Africa, and Southwest Asia.)	US military mail code			AE					
U.S. Armed Forces – Pacific (Note: The U.S. Armed Forces – Pacific include the Indian Ocean, Oceania, and Asia except Southwest Asia.)	US military mail code			AP					
Nebraska	Obsolete postal code (Note: Former USPS code "NB" for Nebraska is now obsolete; it was changed to NE in November 1969 to avoid confusion with New Brunswick, Canada.)			NB					
Northern Mariana Islands	Obsolete postal code (Note: Former USPS code "CM" for the Commonwealth of the Northern Mariana Islands is now obsolete; it was changed to MP in 1988 to match ISO 3166-1.)			CM					
Panama Canal Zone	Obsolete postal code	PZ; PCZ; 594		CZ					
Philippines	Obsolete postal code	PH; PHL; 608		PI					
Trust Territory of the Pacific Islands	Obsolete postal code	PC; PCI; 582		TT					

== History ==
As early as October 1831, the United States Postal Service recognized common abbreviations for states and territories. However, they accepted these abbreviations only because of their popularity, preferring that patrons spell names out in full to avoid confusion.

The traditional abbreviations for U.S. states and territories, widely used in mailing addresses prior to the introduction of two-letter U.S. postal abbreviations, are still commonly used for other purposes (such as legal citation), and are still recognized (though discouraged) by the Postal Service.

Modern two-letter abbreviated codes for the states and territories originated in October 1963, with the issuance of Publication 59: Abbreviations for Use with ZIP Code, three months after the Post Office introduced ZIP codes in July 1963. The purpose, rather than to standardize state abbreviations per se, was to make room in a line of no more than 23 characters for the city, the state, and the ZIP code.

Since 1963, only one state abbreviation has changed. Originally Nebraska was "NB"; but, in November 1969, the Post Office changed it to "NE" to avoid confusion with New Brunswick in Canada.

Prior to 1987, when the U.S. Secretary of Commerce approved the two-letter codes for use in government documents, the United States Government Printing Office (GPO) suggested its own set of abbreviations, with some states left unabbreviated. Today, the GPO supports United States Postal Service standard.

=== Current use of traditional abbreviations ===
Legal citation manuals, such as The Bluebook and The ALWD Citation Manual, typically use the "traditional abbreviations" or variants thereof.

== Codes for states and territories ==
=== ISO standard 3166 ===
ISO 3166-2:US is the entry for the United States in ISO 3166-2, part of the ISO 3166 standard published by the International Organization for Standardization (ISO), which defines codes for the names of the principal subdivisions (e.g., provinces or states) of all countries coded in ISO 3166-1.

=== ANSI standard INCITS 38:2009 ===
The American National Standards Institute (ANSI) established alphabetic and numeric codes for each state and outlying areas in ANSI standard INCITS 38:2009. ANSI standard INCITS 38:2009 replaced the Federal Information Processing Standard (FIPS) standards FIPS 5-2, FIPS 6-4, and FIPS 10-4. The ANSI alphabetic state code is the same as the USPS state code except for U.S. Military Mail locations, which have USPS codes ("AA", "AE", "AP") but no ANSI code.

=== Postal codes ===
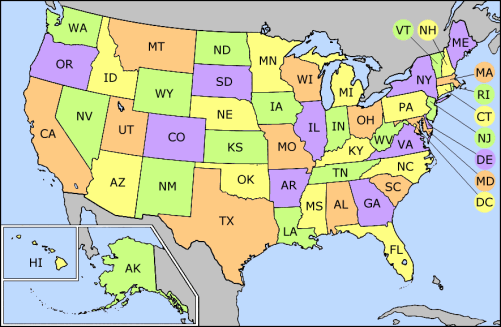

The United States Postal Service (USPS) has established a set of uppercase abbreviations to help process mail with optical character recognition and other automated equipment. There are also official USPS abbreviations for other parts of the address, such as street designators (street, avenue, road, etc.).

These two-letter codes are distinguished from traditional abbreviations such as Calif., Fla., or Tex. The Associated Press Stylebook states that in contexts other than mailing addresses, the traditional state abbreviations should be used. However, the Chicago Manual of Style now recommends use of the uppercase two-letter abbreviations, with the traditional forms as an option.

The postal abbreviation is the same as the ISO 3166-2 subdivision code for each of the fifty states.

These codes do not overlap with the 13 Canadian subnational postal abbreviations. The code for Nebraska changed from NB to NE in November 1969 to avoid a conflict with New Brunswick. Canada likewise chose MB for Manitoba to prevent conflict with either Massachusetts (MA), Michigan (MI), Minnesota (MN), Missouri (MO), or Montana (MT).

=== Coast Guard vessel prefixes ===
The U.S. Coast Guard (USCG) uses a set of two-letter prefixes for vessel numbers; 39 states and the District of Columbia have the same USPS and USCG abbreviations. USCG prefixes have also been established for five outlying territories; all are the same as the USPS abbreviations except the Mariana Islands. The twelve cases where USPS and USCG abbreviations differ, listed below, include three inland states with a small Coast Guard contingent. These twelve abbreviations were changed to avoid conflicting with the ISO 3166 two-digit country codes.

Mismatched USPS and USCG state codes
State	USPS Code	USCG Code
California	CA	CF
Colorado	CO	CL
Delaware	DE	DL
Hawaii	HI	HA
Kansas	KS	KA
Michigan	MI	MC
Mississippi	MS	MI
Massachusetts	MA	MS
Nebraska	NE	NB
Washington	WA	WN
Wisconsin	WI	WS
Northern Mariana Islands	MP	CM

== See also ==
- Australian abbreviation system
- Canadian abbreviation system
- ISO 3166-2:US
- United States Postal Service address formatting information
