= National Information Center =

National Information Center may refer to:

- National Emergency Message
- National Information Center (Chile)
- National Information Center (Saudi Arabia)
