= Federal Information Processing Standard state code =

FIPS standards to identify U.S. national subdivisions

FIPS state codes were numeric and two-letter alphabetic codes defined in U.S. Federal Information Processing Standard Publication ("FIPS PUB") 5-2 to identify U.S. states and certain other associated areas. The standard superseded FIPS PUB 5-1 on May 28, 1987, and was superseded on September 2, 2008, by ANSI standard INCITS 38:2009.

The codes are used in Geographic Names Information System, overseen by the U.S. Board on Geographic Names. The codes were assigned by NIST and each uniquely identified a state, the District of Columbia, or an outlying area of the U.S. These codes were used by the U.S. Census Bureau, the Department of Agriculture to form milk-processing plant numbers, some cash registers during check approval, and in the Emergency Alert System (EAS).

The FCC assigned additional numeric codes used with the EAS for territorial waters of the U.S., but these were not part of the FIPS standard.

The FIPS state alpha code for each U.S. states and the District of Columbia are identical to the postal abbreviations by the United States Postal Service. From September 3, 1987, the same was true of the alpha code for each of the outlying areas, with the exception of U.S. Minor Outlying Islands (UM) as the USPS routes mail for these islands indirectly.

Each of the various minor outlying islands that fell within alpha code UM had an individual numeric code, but no individual alpha code.

On September 2, 2008, FIPS 5-2 was one of ten standards withdrawn by NIST as a Federal Information Processing Standard.

== FIPS state codes ==
The following table enumerates the FIPS state alpha and numeric codes for the states, the District of Columbia, the outlying areas of the United States, the freely associated states, and trust territory, and FIPS state numeric codes for the individual minor outlying island territories.

Only actual U.S. states and the District of Columbia had FIPS state numeric codes in the range 01 through 56.

FIPS PUB 5-1 (published on June 15, 1970, and superseded by FIPS PUB 5-2 on May 28, 1987) stated that certain numeric codes "are reserved for possible future use in identifying American Samoa (03), Canal Zone (07), Guam (14), Puerto Rico (43), and Virgin Islands (52)", but these codes were omitted from FIPS PUB 5-2 without comment. These areas are marked with a * and highlighted in red in the table below.

For states, the "Status" column in the table below includes a link to a list of the counties (boroughs and census areas in Alaska; parishes in Louisiana) for that state including the county codes as defined in FIPS PUB 6-4. The listings of counties for other areas are set out at the end of this article.

Name	Alpha code	Numeric code	Status
Alabama	AL	01	State; counties
Alaska	AK	02	State; boroughs
American Samoa	AS	60	Outlying area under U.S. sovereignty
American Samoa *		03	(FIPS 5-1 reserved code)
Arizona	AZ	04	State; counties
Arkansas	AR	05	State; counties
Baker Island		81	Minor outlying island territory
California	CA	06	State; counties
Canal Zone *		07	(FIPS 5-1 reserved code)
Colorado	CO	08	State; counties
Connecticut	CT	09	State; counties
Delaware	DE	10	State; counties
District of Columbia	DC	11	Federal district
Florida	FL	12	State; counties
Federated States of Micronesia	FM	64	Freely Associated State
Georgia	GA	13	State; counties
Guam *		14	(FIPS 5-1 reserved code)
Guam	GU	66	Outlying area under U.S. sovereignty
Hawaii	HI	15	State; counties
Howland Island		84	Minor outlying island territory
Idaho	ID	16	State; counties
Illinois	IL	17	State; counties
Indiana	IN	18	State; counties
Iowa	IA	19	State; counties
Jarvis Island		86	Minor outlying island territory
Johnston Atoll		67	Minor outlying island territory
Kansas	KS	20	State; counties
Kentucky	KY	21	State; counties
Kingman Reef		89	Minor outlying island territory
Louisiana	LA	22	State; parishes
Maine	ME	23	State; counties
Marshall Islands	MH	68	Freely Associated State
Maryland	MD	24	State; counties
Massachusetts	MA	25	State; counties
Michigan	MI	26	State; counties
Midway Islands		71	Minor outlying island territory
Minnesota	MN	27	State; counties
Mississippi	MS	28	State; counties
Missouri	MO	29	State; counties
Montana	MT	30	State; counties
Navassa Island		76	Minor outlying island territory
Nebraska	NE	31	State; counties
Nevada	NV	32	State; counties
New Hampshire	NH	33	State; counties
New Jersey	NJ	34	State; counties
New Mexico	NM	35	State; counties
New York	NY	36	State; counties
North Carolina	NC	37	State; counties
North Dakota	ND	38	State; counties
Northern Mariana Islands	MP	69	Outlying area under U.S. sovereignty
Ohio	OH	39	State; counties
Oklahoma	OK	40	State; counties
Oregon	OR	41	State; counties
Palau	PW	70	Freely Associated State
Palmyra Atoll		95	Minor outlying island territory
Pennsylvania	PA	42	State; counties
Puerto Rico *		43	(FIPS 5-1 reserved code)
Puerto Rico	PR	72	Outlying area under U.S. sovereignty
Rhode Island	RI	44	State; counties
South Carolina	SC	45	State; counties
South Dakota	SD	46	State; counties
Tennessee	TN	47	State; counties
Texas	TX	48	State; counties
U.S. Minor Outlying Islands	UM	74	Minor outlying island territories (aggregated)
Utah	UT	49	State; counties
Vermont	VT	50	State; counties
Virginia	VA	51	State; counties
Virgin Islands of the U.S. *		52	(FIPS 5-1 reserved code)
Virgin Islands of the U.S.	VI	78	Outlying area under U.S. sovereignty
Wake Island		79	Minor outlying island territory
Washington	WA	53	State; counties
West Virginia	WV	54	State; counties
Wisconsin	WI	55	State; counties
Wyoming	WY	56	State; counties

== Supplemental codes for maritime areas ==
The Emergency Alert System (EAS) and the weather radio service provided by NOAA use these codes to supplement FIPS PUB 5-2 to include certain maritime areas.

EAS code	Maritime area
57	Pacific coast from Washington to California
58	Alaskan coast
59	Hawaiian coast
61	American Samoa waters
65	Mariana Islands waters (including Guam)
73	Atlantic coast from Maine to Virginia
75	Atlantic coast from North Carolina to Florida, and the coasts of Puerto Rico and Virgin Islands
77	Gulf of Mexico
91	Lake Superior
92	Lake Michigan
93	Lake Huron
94	St. Clair River, Detroit River, and Lake St. Clair
96	Lake Erie
97	Niagara River and Lake Ontario
98	St. Lawrence River

== See also ==
- FIPS PUB 10-4 international region codes
