= Specific Area Message Encoding =

Digital audio-based protocol used for broadcasting emergency alerts to specific areas

Specific Area Message Encoding (SAME) is a protocol used for framing and classification of broadcasting emergency warning messages. It was developed by the United States National Weather Service for use on its NOAA Weather Radio (NWR) network, and was later adopted by the Federal Communications Commission for the Emergency Alert System, then subsequently by Environment Canada for use on its Weatheradio Canada service. It is also used to set off receivers in Mexico City and surrounding areas as part of the Mexican Seismic Alert System (SASMEX).

== History ==
From the 1960s to the 1980s, a special feature of the NOAA Weather Radio (NWR) system was the transmission of a single 1050 Hz attention tone prior to the broadcast of any message alerting the general public of significant weather events. This became known as the Warning Alarm Tone (WAT). Although it served NWR well, there were many drawbacks. Without staff at media facilities to manually evaluate the need to rebroadcast an NWR message using the Emergency Broadcast System (EBS), automatic rebroadcasting of all messages preceded by just the WAT was unacceptable and impractical. Even if stations and others with the need were willing to allow for this type of automatic capture, assuming the events for activation were critical, there was no way for automated equipment at the station to know when the message was complete and restore it back to normal operation.

SAME had its beginnings in the early 1980s when NOAA's National Weather Service (NWS) began experimenting with system using analog tones in a dual-tone multi-frequency (DTMF) format to transmit data with radio broadcasts. In 1985, the NWS forecast offices began experimenting with placing special digital codes at the beginning and end of every message concerning life- or property-threatening weather conditions targeting a specific area. The intent of what became SAME was to ultimately transmit a code with the initial broadcast of all NWR messages. However, the roll-out moved slowly until 1995, when the U.S. Government provided the budget needed to develop the SAME technology across the entire radio network. Nationwide implementation occurred in 1997, when the Federal Communications Commission (FCC) adopted the SAME standard as part of its new Emergency Alert System (EAS). In 2003, NOAA established a SAME technology standard for weather radio receivers.

The SAME technique was later adopted by the U.S. Federal Communications Commission (FCC) in 1997 for use in the EAS as well as by Environment Canada for its now discontinued Weatheradio Canada service in 2004. Much like the original EBS dual-tone Attention Signal, this produces a distinct sound (the SAME header) which is easily recognized by most individuals due to its use in weekly and monthly broadcast tests, as well as weather alert messages. During the said events, viewers and/or listeners will hear these digital codes in the form of buzzes, chirps, and clicking sounds (colloquially known as "duck farts" by broadcast engineers) just before the attention signal is sent out and at the conclusion of the voice message.

== Format of digital parts ==
A sample SAME transmission
An example of SAME tones, with the header decoded as follows:
ZCZC-EAS-RWT-012057-012081-012101-012103-012115+0030-2780415-WTSP/TV-
"An EAS Participant has issued a Required Weekly Test for the following counties/areas: Hillsborough FL, Manatee FL, Pasco FL, Pinellas FL, and Sarasota FL at 12:15 am EDT on October 5 effective until 12:45 am EDT. Message from WTSP-TV."

In the SAME system, messages are constructed in four parts, the first and last of which are digital and the middle two are audio. The digital sections of a SAME message are AFSK data bursts, with individual bits lasting 1920 μs (1.92 ms) each, giving a bit rate of 520 5/6 bits per second. A mark bit is four complete cycles of a sine wave, translating to a mark frequency of 2083 1/3 Hz, and a space bit is three complete sine wave cycles, making the space frequency 1562.5 Hz.

The data is sent isochronously and encoded in 8-bit bytes with the most-significant bit of each ASCII byte set to zero. The least-significant bit of each byte is transmitted first, including the preamble. The data stream is bit and byte synchronized on the preamble.

Since there is no error correction, the digital part of a SAME message is transmitted three times, so that decoders can pick "best two out of three" for each byte, thereby eliminating most errors which can cause an activation to fail.

== Header format ==
The text of the header code is a fixed format:

<Preamble>ZCZC-ORG-EEE-PSSCCC+TTTT-JJJHHMM-LLLLLLLL-

This is broken down as follows:

1. A preamble of binary 10101011 (0xAB in hex, character "«" in latin1 and Unicode) repeated sixteen times, used for "receiver calibration" (i.e., clock synchronization), then the letters ZCZC as an attention to the decoder (a message activation method inherited from NAVTEX).
2. ORG – Originator code; programmed per unit when put into operation
  - PEP – National Public Warning System (Previously known as "Primary Entry Point System" until c. 2022. It will be sent as FEMA for National Tests through the Legacy format instead of IPAWS.)
    - President or other authorized national officials
  - CIV – Civil Authorities
    - i.e. Governor, state or local emergency management, local police or fire officials
  - WXR – National Weather Service (or Environment Canada.)
    - Any weather-related alert
  - EAS – EAS Participant (or Broadcast station or cable system)
    - Broadcasters. Generally only used with test messages.
  - EAN – Emergency Action Notification Network (No longer used after c. 2010.)
    - Used to send Emergency Action Notifications. (No longer used, replaced by PEP as of c. 2022.)
3. EEE – Event code; programmed at time of event
4. PSSCCC – Location codes (up to 31 location codes per message), each beginning with a dash character; programmed at time of event
  - In the United States, the first digit (P) is zero if the entire county or area is included in the warning, otherwise, it is a non-zero number depending on the cardinal location of the emergency within the area. The remaining five digits are the FIPS state (SS) and county code (CCC). The entire state may be specified by using county code 000 (three zeros). To specify the entirety of the United States, both the state code and county code must be all zeros.
  - In Canada, all six digits make up a Canadian Location Code, which corresponds to a specific forecast region as used by the Meteorological Service of Canada. All forecast region numbers are six digits with the first digit always zero.
5. TTTT – Purge time of the alert event (from exact time of issue)
  - In the format hhmm, using 15-minute increments up to one hour, using 30-minute increments up to six hours, and using hourly increments beyond six hours. Weekly and monthly tests sometimes have a 12-hour or greater purge time to assure users have an ample opportunity to verify reception of the test event messages; however; 15 minutes is more common, especially on NOAA Weather Radio's tests.
  - For short term events (like a tornado) this value could be set to 0000 (four zeros), which will purge the warning immediately after the message has been received. However, this is not typical, and FCC guidelines suggest a minimum of 15 minutes purge time.
  - The purge time is not intended to coincide with the actual end of the event. Longer events that may not end for days (like hurricanes) may have a purge time of only a few hours. That an event message has been purged does not indicate or imply that the threat has passed.
    In summer of 2023, the National Weather Service changed the maximum purge time for alerts on NOAA Weather Radio from 6 hours to 99.5 hours to address long duration events purging before the event begins.
6. JJJHHMM – Exact time of issue, in UTC, (without time zone adjustments).
  - JJJ is the Ordinal date (day) of the year, with leading zeros
  - HHMM is the hours and minutes (24-hour format), in UTC, with leading zeros
7. LLLLLLLL – Eight-character station callsign identification, with / used instead of – (such as the first eight letters of a cable headend's location, WABC/FM for WABC-FM, KLOX/NWS for a weather radio station programmed from Los Angeles, or EC/GC/CA for a Weatheradio Canada station).

Each field of the header code is terminated by a dash character, including the station ID at the end; individual PSSCCC location numbers are also separated by dashes, with a plus (+) separating the last location from the purge time that follows it.

== Full message format ==
An EAS message contains these elements, in this transmitted sequence:

1. Header
2. Attention signal – Sent if any message is included (normally sent with all messages except RWT on broadcast radio and TV); must be at least eight seconds long. (On weather radio in Canada the 1050 Hz tone is only used with three event codes: RMT, SVR, and TOR.)
  - Single 1050 Hz audio tone used by NOAA Weather Radio.
  - Combined 853 and 960 Hz tones for broadcast radio and TV.
3. Message – An audio message. The FCC permits encoded video or text in lieu of an audio message, but neither are implemented in practice.
4. Tail – (Preamble) NNNN (EOM).

There is one second of blank audio between each section, and before and after each message. For those used to packet communications systems where each packet has a checksum, note that there is no checksum used in the message format. The header and EOM are transmitted three times, and the receiver is obliged to implement columnar parity correction.

The combined tones date back to 1976 when they were made part of the Emergency Broadcast System, the EAS's predecessor.

== Event codes ==
There are roughly 80 different event codes that are used in EAS. These codes are defined federally by the FCC for use in the EAS system and publicly by the Consumer Electronics Association (CEA) standard for SAME protocol weather radio receiver decoder units.

All but the first six of these used to be optional and could be programmed into encoder or decoder units at the request of the broadcaster. However, a July 12, 2007, memo by the FCC now requires mandatory participation in state and local level EAS by broadcasters. Furthermore, the creation and evolution of a voluntary standard by the CEA in December 2003 has provided participating manufacturers of weather radio receivers a single definitive reference to use when designing and programming receivers. In addition, some receiver manufacturers have added an additional layer as to whether or not an event code can be user-suppressed (e.g., a Hurricane Warning in a Midwest US State) or will never be allowed to be suppressed (e.g., Nuclear Power Plant Warning).

The FCC established naming conventions for EAS event codes. The third letter of the code must be one of the following.

Third letter of event code	Category	Description
W	Warning	An event that alone poses a significant threat to public safety and/or property, probability of occurrence and location is high, and the onset time is relatively short.
A	Watch	Meets the classification of a warning, but either the onset time, probability of occurrence, or location is uncertain.
E	Emergency	An event that, by itself, would not kill, injure or do property damage, but indirectly may cause other things to happen that result in a hazard.
S	Statement	A message containing follow up information to a warning, watch, or emergency.

The exceptions to this convention are "TOR" (tornado warning); "SVR" (severe thunderstorm warning); "EVI" (evacuation immediate); "EAN", "EAT", and "NIC" (the EAS national activation codes); and "ADR" (administrative messages).

=== In use ===
Key for event code tables
USA type key		CAN/MEX type key		Event level key	
M	Mandatory code	AB	Administrative bulletin	ADV	Advisory
O1	Original optional code	CI	Currently implemented	WCH	Watch
O2	2002 optional code	RT	Required test	WRN	Warning
O3	2017 optional code	FI	For future implementation	TEST	Test
NI	Not implemented	NI	Not implemented		
		TS	Testing for Implementation		

The following event codes have been implemented by agencies in the United States and/or Canada, and CIRES A.C. in Mexico.

Event Code	U.S. Type	CAN. Type	MEX. Type	Event Description	Event Level
ADR	O1	AB	NI	Administrative Message	ADV
AVA	O2	FI	NI	Avalanche Watch	WCH
AVW	O2	FI	NI	Avalanche Warning	WRN
BLU	O3	NI	NI	Blue Alert (Note: The FCC created the BLU code for Blue Alerts beginning on December 14, 2017.)	WRN
BZW	O1	CI	NI	Blizzard Warning	WRN
CAE	O2	FI	NI	Child Abduction Emergency (Note: Older NOAA weather radios, specifically the Midland WR-100, will transmit a Child Abduction Emergency alert as a Watch.)	ADV
CDW	O2	FI	NI	Civil Danger Warning	WRN
CEM	O1	FI	NI	Civil Emergency Message	WRN
CFA	O2	FI	NI	Coastal Flood Watch	WCH
CFW	O2	FI	NI	Coastal Flood Warning	WRN
DMO	O1	AB	NI	Practice/Demo Warning (Note: Rarely used; intended for "particular purposes" as established in state or local EAS plans. Purposes may include testing of a siren system or audio quality checks.)	TEST
DSW	O2	CI	NI	Dust Storm Warning	WRN
EAN	M	FI	NI	National Emergency Message (Note: Formerly known as "Emergency Action Notification" until c. 2022. A national-level EAS activation: if the alert is ever used, it will be seen on all broadcast stations at the same time across the country to carry a live Presidential message. The only unofficial EAN issued was on November 9, 2011, as a nationwide test of the EAS.)	WRN
EAT	NI	FI	NI	Emergency Action Termination (Note: The FCC in 2012 modified protocol for national EAS activations. Emergency Action Notifications are now treated as any other EAS alert (except that it is mandatory to air), eliminating the need for Emergency Action Terminations; consequently, the FCC removed it from operation. It was not used to terminate the Emergency Action Notification test of 2011.)	ADV
EQW	O2	FI	CI	Earthquake Warning (Note: The EQW and VOW event codes are used in Mexico as part of the Mexican Seismic Alert System (also known as SASMEX). EQW is referred as "Alerta Sísmica", while VOW is referred to as "Alerta Volcánica". Other event codes are being tested, such as Hurricane Warning (HUW), Hurricane Watch (HUA) and Hurricane Statement (HLS). Required Weekly Tests (RWT) are conducted every three hours to make sure receivers are working properly.)	WRN
EVI	O1	FI	NI	Evacuation Immediate (Note: Transmitted through TVs, radios, and NOAA Weather Radios as an "Immediate Evacuation" rather than an "Evacuation Immediate.")	WRN
EWW	O3	NI	NI	Extreme Wind Warning	WRN
FFA	O1	FI	NI	Flash Flood Watch	WCH
FFS	O1	FI	NI	Flash Flood Statement	ADV
FFW	O1	FI	NI	Flash Flood Warning	WRN
FLA	O1	FI	NI	Flood Watch	WCH
FLS	O1	FI	NI	Flood Statement	ADV
FLW	O1	FI	NI	Flood Warning	WRN
FRW	O2	FI	NI	Fire Warning	WRN
FSW	NI	CI	NI	Flash Freeze Warning	WRN
FZW	NI	CI	NI	Freeze Warning (Note: Also known as a "Frost Warning" in Canada. While the CEA standard lists the FZW event code as "Freeze Warning", Environment Canada refers to it as a "Frost Warning". However, it will be displayed as a "Freeze Warning" on receivers that are compliant to the CEA standard.)	WRN
HLS	O1	FI	TS	Hurricane Local Statement	ADV
HMW	O2	FI	NI	Hazardous Materials Warning	WRN
HUA	O1	CI	TS	Hurricane Watch	WCH
HUW	O1	CI	TS	Hurricane Warning	WRN
HWA	O1	FI	NI	High Wind Watch	WCH
HWW	O1	CI	NI	High Wind Warning	WRN
LAE	O2	FI	NI	Local Area Emergency	ADV
LEW	O2	FI	NI	Law Enforcement Warning	WRN
MEP	O?	NI	NI	Missing and Endangered Persons	ADV
NAT	NI	AB	NI	National Audible Test (Note: Proposed and currently unimplemented; it is speculated that it would behave similarly to a nationwide test, but solely focused on the audible aspect.)	TEST
NIC	M	AB	NI	National Information Center (Note: Never used; assumed to be a National Emergency Message follow-up. This code was discontinued on December 12, 2023.)	ADV
NMN	O2	AB	NI	Network Notification Message	ADV
NPT	M	AB	NI	Nationwide Test of the Emergency Alert System (Note: Formerly known as "National Periodic Test" until c. 2022.)	TEST
NST	NI	AB	NI	National Silent Test (Note: Proposed and currently unimplemented; it is speculated that it would test the backend infrastructure of the EAS without alerting the public.)	TEST
NUW	O2	FI	NI	Nuclear Power Plant Warning	WRN
RHW	O2	FI	NI	Radiological Hazard Warning	WRN
RMT	M	RT	NI	Required Monthly Test (Note: These are required to contain headers, an attention signal, an audio message, and end of message tones.)	TEST
RWT	M	RT	CI	Required Weekly Test (Note: RWT alerts only require headers and end of message tones; however, with the exception of NOAA Weather Radio stations, an attention signal and/or audio message are optional.)	TEST
SMW	O2	TS	NI	Special Marine Warning	WRN
SPS	O1	FI	NI	Special Weather Statement	ADV
SPW	O2	FI	NI	Shelter In-Place Warning	WRN
SQW	O1	CI	NI	Snow Squall Warning	WRN
SSA	O3	NI	NI	Storm Surge Watch	WCH
SSW	O3	NI	NI	Storm Surge Warning	WRN
SVA	O1	CI	NI	Severe Thunderstorm Watch	WCH
SVR	O1	CI	NI	Severe Thunderstorm Warning	WRN
SVS	O1	TS	NI	Severe Weather Statement (U.S., CAN)	ADV
TOA	O1	CI	NI	Tornado Watch	WCH
TOE	O2	FI	NI	911 Telephone Outage Emergency	ADV
TOR	O1	CI	NI	Tornado Warning/Emergency	WRN
TRA	O2	CI	NI	Tropical Storm Watch	WCH
TRW	O2	CI	NI	Tropical Storm Warning	WRN
TSA	O1	TS	NI	Tsunami Watch	WCH
TSW	O1	TS	NI	Tsunami Warning	WRN
VOW	O2	FI	CI	Volcano Warning	WRN
WSA	O1	CI	NI	Winter Storm Watch	WCH
WSW	O1	CI	NI	Winter Storm Warning (Note: Environment Canada additionally uses the WSW event code to refer to any of the following weather conditions: Blowing Snow Warning, Freezing Drizzle Warning, Freezing Rain Warning, Snowfall Warning, Snow Squall Warning)	WRN
??A	O2	CI	NI	Unrecognized Watch (Note: Unrecognized Alerts are only seen on NOAA Weather Radios. Instances of unrecognized alerts are typically due to poor reception or for newly implemented event codes, which an older radio may not recognize (i.e. Blue Alert, Missing and Endangered Persons, National Emergency Message, etc.).)	WCH
??E	O2	CI	NI	Unrecognized Emergency	ADV
??S	O2	CI	NI	Unrecognized Statement	ADV
??W	O2	CI	NI	Unrecognized Warning	WRN

=== Internal use only ===
Receiver decoders that comply with the CEA standard will neither display the messages below, nor activate a warning tone if applicable. While the message will be stored in memory, it will not be displayed to the user. The FCC has also designated these event codes as being for "internal use only", and not for display. Environment Canada lists these messages as "Administrative Bulletins".

Event Code	U.S. Type	CAN. Type	Event Description	Event Level
TXB	O2	AB	Transmitter Backup On	ADV
TXF	O2	AB	Transmitter Carrier Off	ADV
TXO	O2	AB	Transmitter Carrier On	ADV
TXP	O2	AB	Transmitter Primary On	ADV

The above events are only seen on NOAA Weather Radio if certain situations happen, such as a station losing power. In this case, the "TXB" or "Transmitter Backup On" code would be transmitted, following by beeping noises of multiple frequencies, finally followed by EOM tones. However, these tones are not typically transmitted over the air.

=== Future implementation ===
The following codes are part of the CEA standard for receiver decoders, but are not listed as being in use by any agencies in the United States. Environment Canada lists these codes, along with several others, as "for possible future implementation". None of these event codes are being implemented in Mexico, as Mexico's network is for seismic and volcanic alerts at this time.

Event Code	U.S. Type	CAN. Type	Event Description	Event Level
BHW	NI	FI	Biological Hazard Warning	WRN
BWW	NI	FI	Boil Water Warning	WRN
CHW	NI	FI	Chemical Hazard Warning	WRN
CWW	NI	FI	Contaminated Water Warning	WRN
DBA	NI	FI	Dam Watch	WCH
DBW	NI	FI	Dam Break Warning	WRN
DEW	NI	FI	Contagious Disease Warning	WRN
EVA	NI	FI	Evacuation Watch	WCH
FCW	NI	FI	Food Contamination Warning	WRN
IBW	NI	FI	Iceberg Warning	WRN
IFW	NI	FI	Industrial Fire Warning	WRN
LSW	NI	FI	Landslide Warning	WRN
POS	NI	FI	Power Outage Advisory	ADV
WFA	NI	FI	Wild Fire Watch	WCH
WFW	NI	FI	Wild Fire Warning	WRN

== On weather radio receivers ==
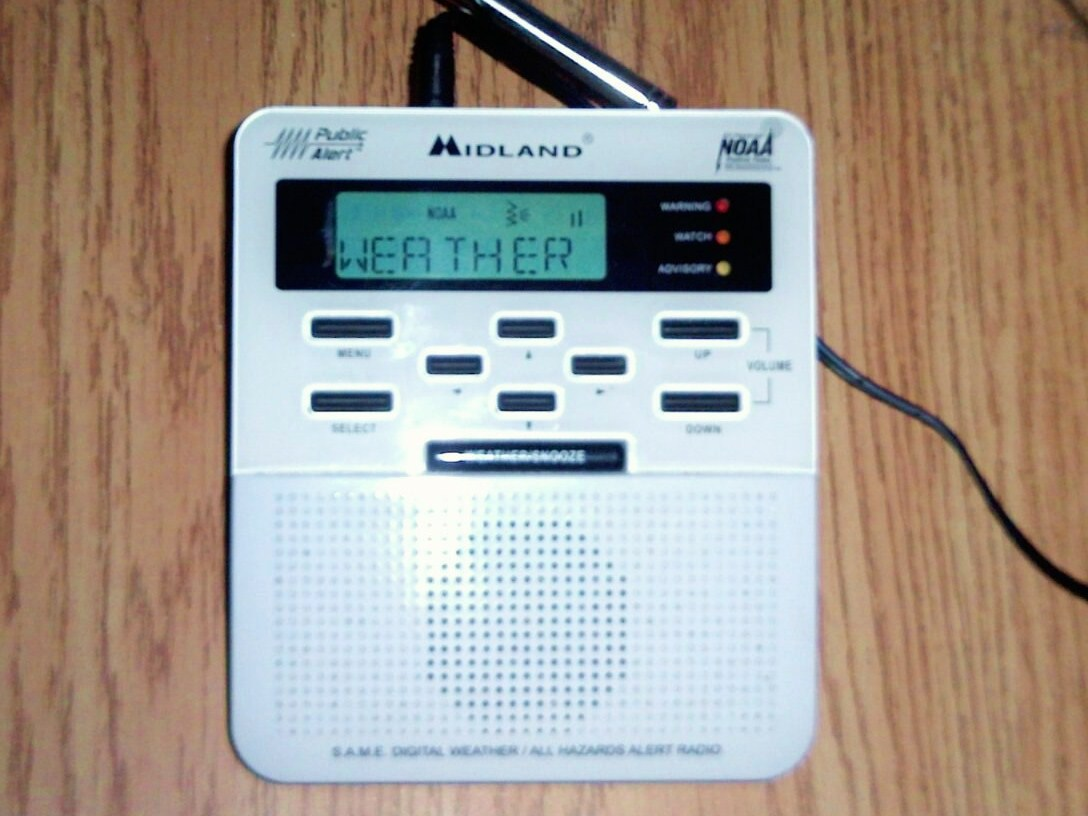
A Midland WR-100, which is a SAME-capable weather radio.

There are many weather or all-hazards radio receivers that are equipped with the SAME alert feature, which allows users to program SAME, FIPS, and CLC codes for their designated area or areas of their interest and/or concern rather than the entire broadcast area. (For example, a person living in Irving, Texas, would program a FIPS code for Dallas County. However, if there is a need to know of severe weather from the west and northwest ahead of time, the user would program additional FIPS codes for Denton and Tarrant Counties.)

On a more specialized receiver, a user has the option to eliminate any SAME alert codes that may not apply to their area such as a "Special Marine Warning" or a "Coastal Flood Warning". Once the SAME header is sent by NOAA or NWS and, if it matches the desired code(s), the receivers then decode the event, scroll it on their display screens, and sound an alarm.

Receivers receive on one of the following National Weather Service network frequencies (in MHz): 162.400, 162.425, 162.450, 162.475, 162.500, 162.525, and 162.550. The signals are typically receivable up to 40 miles (80 km) from the transmitters.

== In popular culture ==
- The Iowa State Cyclones football sports program uses a SAME tone at the end of the pregame video before the football team takes the field. The SAME message is followed by the following narration: "This is a Cyclone Weather Alert! Ladies and Gentlemen, radar has indicated a strong storm approaching Jack Trice Stadium. High winds and low visibility are expected. [The opposing team's] fans in the area should seek immediate cover...."
- The EOM (end of message) tone was heard in the movie trailer for Knowing and in the series Jericho in which its familiar emergency use and its increasing cadence create a sense of foreboding.
- It was used in the movie trailers for Olympus Has Fallen and The Purge. The uses have since been heavily discouraged on air by the Federal Communications Commission (outside public service announcements demonstrating SAME and EAS technology), and stations and networks using them (for instance, TBS and WNKY in Bowling Green, Kentucky) in advertising or promotions have been fined for doing so.
- The SAME tones can be briefly heard in the Impractical Jokers episode "Virtual Insanity".
- SAME Tones are heard in the campaign of the popular video game Call of Duty: Modern Warfare 2, prior to the mission "Of Their Own Accord". Ironically, these tones are decoded down to an EAS Participant issuing a Required Weekly Test on Chicago's ABC affiliate WLS-TV.
- In the 2020 video game Black Mesa, entire emergency messages with SAME tones can be heard on radios as the player progresses, each describing the game's events with increasing urgency. In January 2015, prior to the game's release on Steam as early access, a website was launched that played back one such message as a teaser.
- SAME tones are used within a genre of videos on video sharing platform sites like YouTube known as "EAS scenarios", which depict fictional emergency situations through a series of fictional EAS broadcasts. The majority of SAME tones used within these videos are valid, though some creators choose to use customized tones (and on several occasions, a warning or disclaimer) to prevent unintentional activation of EAS equipment.
- In Leave The World Behind, a conversation is interrupted with a SAME message suddenly emerging from the television, with it later revealing that an "Unrecognised Warning" ("??W") is being distributed over the network.
- A higher-pitched set of SAME tones are heard at the start of the King of the Hill Season 8 episode "Après Hank, le Deluge". The episode also contains a reference to Houston's news and talk station KTRH.

== See also ==
- Common Alerting Protocol (CAP) – A SAME-compatible digital format for multi-system warning coordination.
- METAR – The international meteorological code for an aviation routine weather report.
