= Local area emergency =

Type of public warning issued in the United States

A local area emergency (SAME code: LAE) is an advisory that is issued by local authorities through the Emergency Alert System (EAS) in the United States to notify the public of an event that does not pose a significant threat to public safety and/or property by itself, but could escalate, contribute to other more serious events, or disrupt critical public safety services. Instructions, other than public protective actions, may be provided. Examples include a disruption in water, electric, or natural gas service, road closures due to excessive snowfall, or a potential terrorist threat where the public is asked to remain alert. The alert has a lower priority than a civil emergency message (CEM), but it has a specific location similar to a civil danger warning.

== 2013 Great Falls, Montana hijacking ==
On February 11, 2013, CBS affiliate station KRTV was hacked into, displaying a false local area emergency message for "bodies of the dead rising from their graves" and "attacking the living." The alert was deemed a hoax by local authorities. The audio of the emergency alert was taken from a 2008 Youtube video.

"Civil authorities in your area have reported that the bodies of the dead are rising from their graves and attacking the living. Follow the messages on-screen that will be updated as information becomes available. Do not attempt to approach or apprehend these bodies, as they are considered extremely dangerous. I repeat: civil authorities in your area have reported that the bodies of the dead are rising from their graves and attacking the living. Follow the messages on-screen that will be updated as information becomes available. Do not attempt to approach or apprehend these bodies, as they are considered extremely dangerous. This warning applies to all areas receiving this broadcast. Tune into 920 AM to get updated information in the event that you are separated from your television or if electrical service is interrupted. Civil authorities in your area have reported that the bodies of the dead are rising from their graves and attacking the living. Follow the messages on-screen that will be updated as information becomes available. This station will now cease transmission, so please use your battery powered radio and tune into 920 AM for further information."

== Examples ==
=== Winter weather related local area emergencies ===
On February 12, 2014, Limestone County, Alabama issued an alert regarding hazardous road conditions resulting from a winter storm impacting the area.

898 
WOUS44 KHUN 122346
LAEHUN
ALC083-130600-

URGENT - IMMEDIATE BROADCAST REQUESTED
LOCAL AREA EMERGENCY
LIMESTONE COUNTY EMERGENCY MANAGEMENT AGENCY ATHENS AL
RELAYED BY NATIONAL WEATHER SERVICE HUNTSVILLE AL
546 PM CST WED FEB 12 2014

...LOCAL AREA EMERGENCY FOR LIMESTONE COUNTY...

THE FOLLOWING MESSAGE IS TRANSMITTED AT THE REQUEST OF THE
LIMESTONE COUNTY EMERGENCY MANAGEMENT AGENCY IN ATHENS AL.

ROAD REPORTS FROM THROUGHOUT THE COUNTY INDICATE THAT ALL ROADS ARE 
BECOMING EXTREMELY DANGEROUS TO IMPASSABLE DUE TO SNOWFALL THIS
AFTERNOON AND EVENING. ANY TRAVEL SHOULD BE LIMITED TO EMERGENCY
TRAVEL ONLY. ROAD CREWS ARE TRYING TO TREAT AREAS THAT HAVE BECOME
ICE COVERED. HOWEVER...WITH THE CONTINUED SNOWFALL...CONDITIONS ARE
DANGEROUS FOR ROAD CREWS AS WELL. 

$$

On February 20, 2015, several roads across the state of Alabama became impassable due to heavy snowfall. County agencies across the state issued a message that discouraged travel due to the severity of the winter storm.

385 
WOUS44 KHUN 202202
LAEHUN
ALC033-049-071-083-089-095-103-210200-

URGENT - IMMEDIATE BROADCAST REQUESTED
LOCAL AREA EMERGENCY
MULTIPLE NORTH ALABAMA EMERGENCY MANAGEMENT AGENCIES
RELAYED BY NATIONAL WEATHER SERVICE HUNTSVILLE AL
401 PM CST FRI FEB 20 2015

...LOCAL AREA EMERGENCY FOR COLBERT...DEKALB...JACKSON...LIMESTONE...
MADISON...MARSHALL...AND MORGAN COUNTIES...

THE FOLLOWING MESSAGE IS TRANSMITTED AT THE REQUEST OF THE SEVERAL 
COUNTY EMERGENCY MANAGEMENT AGENCIES ACROSS NORTH ALABAMA.

MANY IF NOT ALL ROADS ACROSS THE FOLLOWING NORTH ALABAMA COUNTIES ARE
BECOMING TREACHEROUS AND IMPASSABLE DUE TO SNOW AND SLEET. COLBERT...
MORGAN...MADISON...MARSHALL...DEKALB AND JACKSON COUNTIES ARE
DISCOURAGING ANY TRAVEL UNLESS IT IS AN EMERGENCY.

$$

On February 22, 2022, the Ashland County Sherriff's Office in Duluth, Minnesota issued an alert about impassable conditions on U.S. Highway 2 and State Highway 13 North for the town of Eileen due to severe winter weather conditions.

786 
WOUS43 KDLH 220631
LAEDLH
WIC003-221145-

BULLETIN - EAS ACTIVATION REQUESTED
Local Area Emergency
Ashland County Sheriffs Office
Relayed by National Weather Service Duluth MN
1231 AM CST Tue Feb 22 2022

...ROAD CLOSURE IN NORTHERN ASHLAND COUNTY...

The following message is transmitted at the request of the
Ashland County Sheriffs Office.

This is an urgent message from the Ashland County Communications
Center. US Highway 2 and State Highway 13 North is declared
impassable and close on the Chequamegon Bayfront between State
Highway 112 in the City of Ashland and State Highway 13 North in 
the town of Eileen due to extreme weather conditions. Motorists 
must use the designated State Highway 137 alternate route. Tune 
to local radio or television stations for further details. 

$$

=== Public safety related local area emergencies ===
On September 21, 2013, the Tennessee Emergency Management Agency warned residents receiving power from Duck River Electric Company of a planned power outage on 22 September 2013 from 12:00 AM CDT until 4:00 AM CDT.

341 
WOUS44 KHUN 211759
LAEHUN
TNC103-127-220500-

URGENT - IMMEDIATE BROADCAST REQUESTED
LOCAL AREA EMERGENCY
TENNESSEE EMERGENCY MANAGEMENT AGENCY NASHVILLE TN
RELAYED BY NATIONAL WEATHER SERVICE HUNTSVILLE AL
1259 PM CDT SAT SEP 21 2013

...LOCAL AREA EMERGENCY FOR LINCOLN AND MOORE COUNTIES...

THE FOLLOWING MESSAGE IS TRANSMITTED AT THE REQUEST OF THE
TENNESSEE EMERGENCY MANAGEMENT AGENCY NASHVILLE TN.

DUCK RIVER ELECTRIC CUSTOMERS WILL BE WITHOUT POWER FOR ABOUT 4 HOURS
BEGINNING 12 AM ON SUNDAY SEPTEMBER 22ND. THE OUTAGE WILL AFFECT ALL
OF MOORE COUNTY AND PART OF LINCOLN COUNTY AROUND BOONEVILLE. THE
OUTAGE WILL ALLOW DUCK RIVER AND TVA TO PERFORM SYSTEM MAINTENANCE.

IF YOU RELY ON MEDICAL EQUIPMENT DEPENDENT ON ELECTRICITY, HAVE A
PLAN TO MAINTAIN USE OF YOUR EQUIPMENT DURING THE OUTAGE. CHARGE
YOUR CELL PHONES. CORDLESS PHONES WILL NOT WORK DURING THE POWER
OUTAGE. UNPLUG COMPUTER, TELEVISIONS, AND SENSITIVE ELECTRONICS.
NOTIFY YOUR HOME SECURITY COMPANY. KNOW HOW TO MANUALLY OPERATE
GARAGE DOORS AND ELECTRIC GATES. MINIMIZE OPENING REFRIGERATOR AND
FREEZER DOORS DURING THE OUTAGE. IF YOU HAVE A GENERATOR, MAKE SURE
IT HAS BEEN INSTALLED PROPERLY. CHECK TO MAKE SURE ALL HEAT
PRODUCING APPLIANCES SUCH AS STOVES, TOASTER OVENS, AND IRONS ARE
TURNED OFF. IF ELECTRICITY IS REQUIRED TO RUN YOUR WATER OR TO REFILL
YOUR TOILET FOR FLUSHING, HAVE A RESERVE OF WATER ON HAND PRIOR TO
THE PLANNED POWER OUTAGE. NEVER USE A GAS RANGE, INDOOR COOKER,
CHARCOAL OR GAS BARBEQUE FOR HEATING. CALL 911 IF YOU HAVE AN
EMERGENCY.

$$

On April 5, 2020, in the midst of the Covid-19 pandemic, the Kanawha-Charleston Health Department in West Virginia issued restrictions intended to limit the spread of Covid-19.

875 
WOUS41 KRLX 052157
LAERLX
WVC039-060400-

BULLETIN - EAS ACTIVATION REQUESTED
LOCAL AREA EMERGENCY
WEST VIRGINIA EMERGENCY MANAGEMENT AGENCY CHARLESTON WEST
VIRGINIA
RELAYED BY NATIONAL WEATHER SERVICE CHARLESTON WV
557 PM EDT SUN APR 5 2020

THE FOLLOWING MESSAGE IS TRANSMITTED AT THE REQUEST OF THE WEST
VIRGINIA EMERGENCY MANAGEMENT AGENCY CHARLESTON WEST VIRGINIA.

THE KANAWHA-CHARLESTON HEALTH DEPARTMENT HAS ISSUED FURTHER
RESTRICTIONS TO THE STAY AT HOME ORDER AND RESTRICTIONS FOR 
ESSENTIAL BUSINESSES. ALL CITIZENS AND BUSINESSES NEED TO BE 
ADVISED REGARDING THESE RESTRICTIONS. 

PLEASE VISIT THE KANAWHA CHARLESTON HEALTH DEPARTMENT WEBSITE AT 
WWW.KCHDWV.ORG TO READ THE FULL ORDER. 

$$

On April 22, 2026, a gas leak in Kanawha County, West Virginia, prompted a shelter-in-place order.

WVC039-221900-

BULLETIN - EAS ACTIVATION REQUESTED
Local Area Emergency
WV Kanawha County
Relayed by National Weather Service Charleston WV
1229 PM EDT Wed Apr 22 2026

The following message is transmitted at the request of the WV
Kanawha County.

A shelter in place remains in effect within 1 mile of the
Catalyst Refiners in Institute, including West Virginia State
University. This does not include within the St. Albans city
limits. Please tune into local news and radio for updates.

$
