= List of counties in New Hampshire =

Counties of New Hampshire
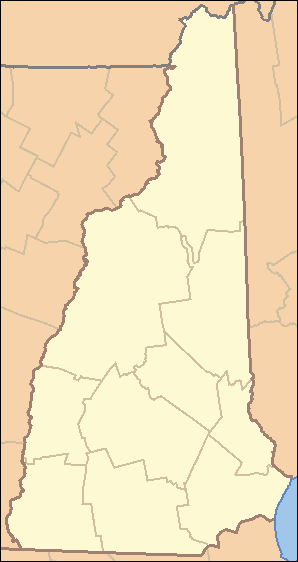
- Location: State of New Hampshire
- Number: 10
- Populations: 31,343 (Coös) – 433,415 (Hillsborough)
- Areas: 369 square miles (960 km^{2}) (Strafford) – 1,801 square miles (4,660 km^{2}) (Coös)
- Government: County government
- Subdivisions: Cities, towns, townships, villages, unincorporated territories, census-designated places

There are ten counties in the U.S. state of New Hampshire. Five of the counties were created in 1769, when New Hampshire was still an English colony and not a state, during the first subdivision of the state into counties. The last counties created were Belknap County and Carroll County, in 1840.

Seven of New Hampshire's counties were named for prominent British or American people. Two are named after geographic locations. At least one county's name originates in a Native American language: Coös County, named for an Algonquian word meaning "small pines". Merrimack County, which is named after the river, may originate in a Native American language as well, but the etymology of the river's name is uncertain.

The counties tend to be smaller in land area towards the southern end of the state, where New Hampshire population is concentrated, and larger in land area in the less populous north.

The FIPS county code is the five-digit Federal Information Processing Standard (FIPS) code which uniquely identifies counties and county equivalents in the United States. The three-digit number is unique to each individual county within a state, but to be unique within the entire United States, it must be prefixed by the state code. This means that, for example, while Belknap County, New Hampshire is 001, Addison County, Vermont and Alachua County, Florida are also 001. To uniquely identify Belknap County, New Hampshire, one must use the state code of 33 plus the county code of 001; therefore, the unique nationwide identifier for Belknap County, New Hampshire is 33001. The links in the column FIPS County Code are to the Census Bureau Info page for that county.

== List ==
County	FIPS code	County seat	Est.	Formed from	Etymology	Population Density	Population	Area	Map
Belknap County	001	Laconia	January 1, 1841	Parts of Merrimack County and Strafford County.	Jeremy Belknap (1744–1798), early New Hampshire historian.	162.46/sq mi (62.73/km^{2})	65,147	401 sq mi (1,039 km^{2})	State map highlighting Belknap County
Carroll County	003	Ossipee	January 1, 1841	Part of Strafford County.	Charles Carroll of Carrollton (1737–1832), the last surviving signatory of the United States Declaration of Independence.	56.51/sq mi (21.82/km^{2})	52,784	934 sq mi (2,419 km^{2})	State map highlighting Carroll County
Cheshire County	005	Keene	April 29, 1769	One of five original counties.	English county of Cheshire.	110.55/sq mi (42.68/km^{2})	78,269	708 sq mi (1,834 km^{2})	State map highlighting Cheshire County
Coös County	007	Lancaster	March 1, 1805	Part of Grafton County.	An Algonquian word meaning "small pines".	17.40/sq mi (6.72/km^{2})	31,343	1,801 sq mi (4,665 km^{2})	State map highlighting Coös County
Grafton County	009	Haverhill	April 29, 1769	One of five original counties.	Augustus Henry Fitzroy, 3rd Duke of Grafton (1735–1811), a Prime Minister of Great Britain (1768–1770).	54.39/sq mi (21.00/km^{2})	93,225	1,714 sq mi (4,439 km^{2})	State map highlighting Grafton County
Hillsborough County	011	Manchester and Nashua	April 29, 1769	One of five original counties.	Wills Hill, 1st Marquess of Downshire (1718–1793), known in America as the Earl of Hillsborough, who served as the first Secretary of State for the Colonies.	494.77/sq mi (191.03/km^{2})	433,415	876 sq mi (2,269 km^{2})	State map highlighting Hillsborough County
Merrimack County	013	Concord	August 1, 1823	Parts of Hillsborough County and Rockingham County.	The Merrimack River.	169.25/sq mi (65.35/km^{2})	158,078	934 sq mi (2,419 km^{2})	State map highlighting Merrimack County
Rockingham County	015	Brentwood	April 29, 1769	One of five original counties.	Charles Watson-Wentworth, 2nd Marquess of Rockingham (1730–1782), a two-time Prime Minister of Great Britain (1765–1766, 1782).	466.30/sq mi (180.04/km^{2})	324,077	695 sq mi (1,800 km^{2})	State map highlighting Rockingham County
Strafford County	017	Dover	April 29, 1769	One of five original counties.	William Wentworth, 2nd Earl of Strafford (1626–1695), an English noble who owned colonial lands.	365.97/sq mi (141.30/km^{2})	135,043	369 sq mi (956 km^{2})	State map highlighting Strafford County
Sullivan County	019	Newport	September 4, 1827	Part of Cheshire County.	John Sullivan (1740–1795), the third and fifth governor of New Hampshire (1786–1788, 1789–1790).	81.86/sq mi (31.61/km^{2})	43,961	537 sq mi (1,391 km^{2})	State map highlighting Sullivan County

== Racial / Ethnic Profile of counties in New Hampshire (2020 Census) ==
Racial / Ethnic Profile of counties in New Hampshire (2020 Census)
Following is a table of counties in New Hampshire by race/ethnicity. The majority racial/ethnic group is coded per the key below.

Majority minority with no dominant group
Majority White
Majority Black
Majority Hispanic
Majority Asian
Majority Native American

Racial and ethnic composition of counties in New Hampshire (2020 Census) (NH = Non-Hispanic) Note: the US Census treats Hispanic/Latino as an ethnic category. This table excludes Latinos from the racial categories and assigns them to a separate category. Hispanics/Latinos may be of any race.
County	Location of County	Total Population	White alone (NH)	%	Black or African American alone (NH)	%	Native American or Alaska Native alone (NH)	%	Asian alone (NH)	%	Pacific Islander alone (NH)	%	Other race alone (NH)	%	Mixed race or Multiracial (NH)	%	Hispanic or Latino (any race)	%
Belknap		63,705	58,714	92.17%	324	0.51%	122	0.19%	582	0.91%	11	0.02%	188	0.30%	2,503	3.93%	1,261	1.98%
Carroll		50,107	46,947	93.69%	131	0.26%	100	0.20%	358	0.71%	6	0.01%	206	0.41%	1,590	3.17%	769	1.53%
Cheshire		76,458	69,264	90.59%	648	0.85%	146	0.19%	1,067	1.40%	46	0.06%	305	0.40%	3,180	4.16%	1,802	2.36%
Coos		31,268	28,629	91.56%	494	1.58%	84	0.27%	193	0.62%	3	0.01%	71	0.23%	1,122	3.59%	672	2.15%
Grafton		91,118	80,370	88.20%	783	0.86%	180	0.20%	2,855	3.13%	24	0.03%	368	0.40%	3,959	4.34%	2,579	2.83%
Hillsborough		422,937	342,652	81.02%	10,044	2.37%	630	0.15%	16,413	3.88%	112	0.03%	2,383	0.56%	17,205	4.07%	33,498	7.92%
Merrimack		153,808	137,252	89.24%	2,536	1.65%	310	0.20%	3,013	1.96%	59	0.04%	575	0.37%	6,183	4.02%	3,880	2.52%
Rockingham		314,176	283,099	90.11%	2,076	0.66%	342	0.11%	6,247	1.99%	79	0.03%	1,236	0.39%	10,840	3.45%	10,257	3.26%
Strafford		130,889	114,599	87.55%	1,434	1.10%	251	0.19%	4,473	3.42%	42	0.03%	403	0.31%	5,773	4.41%	3,914	2.99%
Sullivan		43,063	39,123	90.85%	185	0.43%	134	0.31%	403	0.94%	6	0.01%	181	0.42%	2,209	5.13%	822	1.91%
