= Civil danger warning =

Type of emergency alert issued in the United States

A Civil Danger Warning (SAME code: CDW) is a warning issued through the Emergency Alert System (EAS) in the United States to warn the public of an event that presents danger to a significant civilian population. It is typically issued by a local or state authority and is relayed by the National Weather Service in select areas. The warning usually mentions a specific hazard such as contaminated water supply, active shooting, unexpected weather events that lead to deteriorated road conditions, a major accident, or an imminent or in-progress military or terrorist attack. It may also provide instructions for protective action such as to evacuate, shelter-in-place, boil water or seek medical treatment. The warning has a higher priority than a local area emergency (LAE) and a civil emergency message (CEM); however, the CDW and a Local Area Emergency are often in effect for specific areas.

== False activations ==
=== Hawaii false missile alert ===
On January 13, 2018, as part of the false missile alert, a false Civil Danger Warning interrupted local television and radio broadcasts throughout Hawaii, in addition to the warning sent to smartphones.

BALLISTIC MISSILE THREAT INBOUND TO HAWAII. SEEK IMMEDIATE SHELTER. THIS IS NOT A DRILL.

A subsequent TV alert included the following message:

The U.S. Pacific Command has detected a missile threat to Hawaii. A missile may impact on land or sea within minutes. THIS IS NOT A DRILL. If you are indoors, stay indoors. If you are outdoors, seek immediate shelter in a building. Remain indoors well away from windows. If you are driving, pull safely to the side of the road and seek shelter in a building or lay on the floor. We will announce when the threat has ended. THIS IS NOT A DRILL. Take immediate action measures.

=== Guam false civil danger warning ===
On August 15, 2017, 2 radio stations, a music channel, and a Christian network in Guam aired a false civil danger warning, which sent many people into a panic, especially since tensions with North Korea at the time were heightened.

=== 2022 Peoria, Illinois parking ban ===
On February 1, 2022, Peoria County, Illinois mistakenly issued a civil danger warning for an upcoming parking ban in anticipation for a winter storm. (The original alert was intended to be sent out as a Civil Emergency Message.)

395 
WOUS43 KILX 012242
CDWILX
ILC143-020442-

BULLETIN - EAS ACTIVATION REQUESTED
Civil Danger Warning
IL Peoria County
Relayed by National Weather Service Lincoln IL
442 PM CST Tue Feb 1 2022

...Civil Danger Warning...

The following message is transmitted at the request of Peoria
County.

...This message is being issued for residents of the City of
Peoria.  A city-wide parking ban is in effect from 6pm February
1st through 6pm February 3.  Residents must move their vehicles
from all City streets to allow for plows and emergency vehicles. 
Alternative parking locations include the south parking lot of
Northwoods Mall... 2200 West War Memorial Drive...  Twin Towers
Parking Garage... 123 South West Jefferson St... Niagara Parking
Garage... 109 West Adams Street... and the Jefferson Parking
Garage... 236 South West Jefferson Street. Parking is free in
these locations until 8 am on Saturday February 5. Do not park in
the alleys.  Any cars left on the streets are subject to towing
and tickets.  During this snow event... residents are asked to
stay home for their safety and to let snowplow drivers and
emergency vehicles work.  REPEAT- A City-Wide parking ban is in
effect for the City of Peoria starting at 6pm this evening.  For
more information... call 494 CARE Monday-Friday from 8 to 6 and
Saturday from 9 to 1...

$$

OnSolve-9922de8b3a1240c28d82d3f20c64f014/IL Peoria County

== Test civil danger warning ==
914 
WOUS43 KFGF 272014
CDWFGF
MNC135-272114-

BULLETIN - EAS ACTIVATION REQUESTED
Civil Danger Warning
MN Roseau County
Relayed by National Weather Service Grand Forks ND
314 PM CDT Wed May 27 2026

...IPAWS Test - This is a test of the IPAWS System...

The following message is transmitted at the request of MN Roseau
County.

This is a test of the IPAWS System

$$

2550593709149887/Roseau County MN

== Winter weather-related civil danger warnings ==
On January 10, 2005, Mono County, California issued a civil danger warning regarding an avalanche for avalanche prone areas of Mono County.

000 
WOUS45 KREV 102231
CDWREV

CAC051-110423-

BULLETIN - EAS ACTIVATION REQUESTED
CIVIL DANGER WARNING
MONO COUNTY OFFICE OF EMERGENCY SERVICES
RELAYED BY NATIONAL WEATHER SERVICE RENO NV
229 PM PST MON JAN 10 2005

AN AVALANCHE WARNING HAS BEEN ISSUED FOR MONO COUNTY AVALANCHE PRONE
AREAS OF JUNE LAKE, MCGEE CREEK AND SWALL MEADOWS.

THE MONO COUNTY OFFICE OF EMERGENCY SERVICES HAS ISSUED AN AVALANCHE
WARNING FOR THE AVALANCHE PRONE AREAS OF MONO COUNTY.  AVALANCHE
DANGER IS EXTREMELY HIGH. A MONO COUNTY SHERIFFS DEPARTMENT OVER THE
SNOW VEHICLE WAS STRUCK BY AN AVALANCHE ON THE BACK SIDE OF TWIN
LAKES, BRIDGEPORT AT 1114 HOURS TODAY.  SHERIFFS DEPUTIES IN THE
VEHICLE WERE UNINJURED AND ABLE TO DIG THEIR WAY OUT OF THE
AVALANCHE.

THE DEPUTIES WERE ATTEMPTING TO REMOVE RESIDENTS IN THE AREA TO
SAFER LOCATIONS.  RESIDENTS WHO LIVE IN THE AVALANCHE PRONE AREAS ARE
REQUESTED TO EVACUATED TO A SAFER LOCATION UNTIL CONDITIONS IMPROVE. 
SHELTERS ARE AVAILABLE FOR PERSONS WHO ARE DISPLACED BY EVACUATION.

$$

A blizzard affected much of the United States and Canada, forecasted to bring several feet of snow to Wisconsin and severely impact travel in early-February 2011. On February 2, 2011, the Wisconsin Emergency Management Agency of Milwaukee issued a subsequent civil danger warning for the southern part of the state.

726 
WOUS43 KMKX 020641
CDWMKX
WIC021-025-027-039-045-047-049-055-059-065-077-079-089-101-105-
111-117-127-131-133-021145-

BULLETIN - EAS ACTIVATION REQUESTED
CIVIL DANGER WARNING
WISCONSIN EMERGENCY MANAGEMENT AGENCY MILWAUKEE/SULLIVAN
WISCONSIN
RELAYED BY NATIONAL WEATHER SERVICE MILWAUKEE/SULLIVAN WI
1241 AM CST WED FEB 2 2011

THE FOLLOWING MESSAGE IS TRANSMITTED AT THE REQUEST OF THE
WISCONSIN EMERGENCY MANAGEMENT AGENCY MILWAUKEE/SULLIVAN
WISCONSIN.

DRIVING IS EXTREMELY HAZARDOUS TONIGHT ON ALL ROADS IN SOUTHERN
WISCONSIN. IF YOU BECOME STRANDED...EMERGENCY VEHICLES MAY NOT BE
ABLE TO REACH YOU.

IF YOU ARE STRANDED...DO NOT LEAVE YOUR VEHICLE. RUN YOUR VEHICLE
10 MINUTES PER HOUR...AND CRACK A DOWNWIND WINDOW FOR VENTILATION.


$$
KAPELA/SEARS

On March 15, 2026, the Rice County Sherriff's Office in Rice County, Minnesota issued a civil danger warning to avoid travel on roads due to a blizzard that impacted the area, making road conditions unsafe for motorists.

113 
WOUS43 KMPX 151314
CDWMPX
MNC131-147-151714-

BULLETIN - EAS ACTIVATION REQUESTED
Civil Danger Warning
MN Rice County Sheriffs Office
Relayed by National Weather Service Twin Cities/Chanhassen MN
814 AM CDT Sun Mar 15 2026

...STAY OFF ROADS...

The following message is transmitted at the request of RICE/STEELE
911 CENTER.

Steele County: Non-essential personnel please STAY OFF ROADS to
ensure your safety. Current road conditions pose significant risks
to drivers and pedestrians. Crews are at work restoring roads to
safe conditions.

&&

LAT...LON 4421 9327 4420 9296 4384 9295 4384 9301
      4383 9301 4380 9325 4381 9337 4391 9341
      4398 9342 4410 9340 4420 9340 4421 9339

$$

2415869175064583/RICE/STEELE 911 CENTER

== Public safety-related civil danger warnings ==
On May 26, 2019, storms part of a major tornado outbreak flooded the Arkansas River to record high levels. The next day (May 27, 2019), the Arkansas Emergency Management Agency issued a civil danger warning alerting residents of the closure of McLean Bottom (a levee in Logan County) and its surrounding roads due to forecasted additional flooding.

597 
WOUS44 KLZK 272046
CDWLZK
ARC083-280000-

URGENT - IMMEDIATE BROADCAST REQUESTED
CIVIL DANGER WARNING
ARKANSAS EMERGENCY MANAGEMENT AGENCY LITTLE ROCK ARKANSAS
RELAYED BY NATIONAL WEATHER SERVICE LITTLE ROCK AR
346 PM CDT MON MAY 27 2019

THE FOLLOWING MESSAGE IS TRANSMITTED AT THE REQUEST OF THE
LOGAN COUNTY EMERGENCY MANAGEMENT AGENCY AND THE LOGAN COUNTY 
JUDGE.

MCLEAN BOTTOMS IN LOGAN COUNTY IS CLOSED OFF TO ALL PUBLIC
ACCESS EFFECTIVE IMMEDIATELY. THIS INCLUDES PORTIONS OF NORTH
HIGHWAY 309, COTTONTOWN RD., AND KALAMAZOO ROAD. THIS IS BY 
ORDER OF THE LOGAN COUNTY JUDGE, NO PERSONS ARE ALLOWED IN
THIS AREA DUE TO FORECAST FLOODING. DRIVING INTO THIS AREA 
MAY PUT YOUR LIFE IN DANGER!

$$

CAVANAUGH

On 10 August 2021, Adams County Emergency Management in Nebraska issued a shelter in place warning (issued as a civil danger warning) for an active shooter in Juniata.

166 
WOUS43 KGID 110452
CDWGID
NEC001-110552-

BULLETIN - EAS ACTIVATION REQUESTED
CIVIL DANGER WARNING
NE ADAMS COUNTY EMERGENCY MANAGEMENT
RELAYED BY NATIONAL WEATHER SERVICE HASTINGS NE
1152 PM CDT TUE AUG 10 2021

...ACTIVE SHOOTER IN PROGRESS...

THE FOLLOWING MESSAGE IS TRANSMITTED AT THE REQUEST OF ADAMS
COUNTY EMERGENCY MANAGEMENT.

THERE IS AN ACTIVE SHOOTER CURRENTLY IN JUNIATA NE AROUND THE N.
BRASS AREA. SHELTER IN PLACE IMMEDIATELY.

SHELTER IN PLACE IMMEDIATELY AND LOCK ALL WINDOWS AND DOORS. THIS
IS FOR THE JUNIATA AREA AND 2 MILES EAST OF JUNIATA NEBRASKA.

$$

AS-NE-872DB331-ABDF-4F99-84C5-4E69A19C1C46/ALERTSENSE

On December 8, 2025, an outage with non-emergency phone lines of the Rice County Law Enforcement Agencies led to the Rice/Steele County 911 Center issuing a notice for residents of Rice/Steele County.

309 
WOUS43 KMPX 082301
CDWMPX
MNC131-147-090301-

BULLETIN - EAS ACTIVATION REQUESTED
Civil Danger Warning
MN Rice County Sheriffs Office
Relayed by National Weather Service Twin Cities/Chanhassen MN
501 PM CST Mon Dec 8 2025

...PHONE OUTAGE...

The following message is transmitted at the request of RICE/STEELE
911 CENTER.

Phone outage affecting Rice County Law Enforcement Agencies. If
needed... dial 911.

&&

LAT...LON 4456 9327 4454 9302 4438 9303 4418 9304
      4417 9304 4417 9306 4417 9317 4419 9324
      4418 9327 4419 9343 4420 9358 4444 9360
      4457 9353

$$

2295438292145148/RICE/STEELE 911 CENTER
