= Law enforcement warning =

EAS code used in the event of criminal danger to public safety

A law enforcement warning (SAME code: LEW) is a warning issued through the Emergency Alert System (EAS) in the United States to warn the public of criminal, and sometimes hazardous weather events that pose a threat to public safety. These include jailbreaks, riots, bomb explosions, and on rare occasions, severe weather events like blizzards. An authorized law enforcement agency may blockade roads, waterways, or facilities, evacuate or deny access to affected areas, and arrest violators or suspicious persons. The warning is usually issued by a law enforcement agency and is relayed by the National Weather Service.

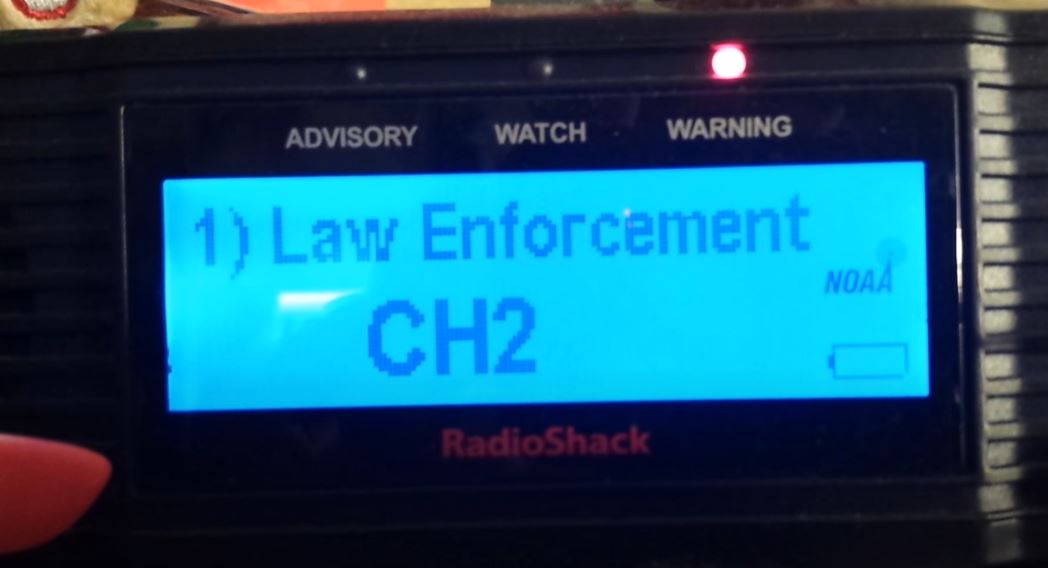
A Law Enforcement Warning being displayed on a RadioShack 12-519 weather radio receiver.

== Examples ==
On September 23, 2011. The Wyoming Department of Corrections issued a Law Enforcement Warning due to an escape of an inmate from the Wyoming Honor Conversation Camp in Newcastle, Wyoming.

735 
WOUS45 KCYS 232252
LEWCYS
WYC001-007-009-015-021-027-031-232253-

BULLETIN - IMMEDIATE BROADCAST REQUESTED
LAW ENFORCEMENT WARNING
COUNTY EMERGENCY MANAGEMENT AGENCY
RELAYED BY NATIONAL WEATHER SERVICE CHEYENNE WY
1011 AM MDT FRI SEP 23 2011

THE FOLLOWING MESSAGE IS TRANSMITTED AT THE REQUEST OF THE 
WYOMING DEPARTMENT OF CORRECTIONS. 

INMATE DERRICK LEE BROCK IS ON ESCAPE STATUS FROM THE
WYOMING HONOR CONSERVATION CAMP IN NEWCASTLE WYO., AS OF
06:30 AM ON FRIDAY, SEPTEMBER 23, 2011.  HE IS 5 FOOT, 8
INCHES,  APPROXIMATELY 170  LBS., FAIR COMPLEXION, WHITE,
BLOND HAIR AND BLUE EYES.  HE IS 40 YEARS OLD. HE WAS LAST
SEEN WEARING BLUE JEANS AND A GREEN SHIRT. 

INMATE BROCK IS SERVING A SENTENCE FOR LARCENY.  HE WAS
SENTENCED IN 2011 TO 7 TO 10 YEARS. 

INMATE BROCK WAS DISCOVERED MISSING WHILE ON A WORK DETAIL
AT THE STATE FAIRGROUNDS IN DOUGLAS.  HE WAS LAST SEEN AT
6:00 AM AND DISCOVERED MISSING AT 06:30 AM FOLLOWING AN
INMATE COUNT.  INMATE BROCK HAD PLACED HIS BACK PACK UNDER
HIS BLANKETS TO MIMIC A SLEEPING BODY.   LOCAL LAW
ENFORCEMENT WAS NOTIFIED AND AREA RESIDENTS WERE ALERTED AS
SOON AS THE ESCAPE WAS CONFIRMED. ADDITIONAL STAFF WAS
CALLED BACK TO THE FACILITY IN NEWCASTLE, AND A FULL
EMERGENCY COUNT WAS CONDUCTED WITH ALL INMATES ACCOUNTED
FOR AT THE FACILITY. 

THE PUBLIC IS ADVISED NOT TO APPROACH THIS PERSON, BUT IF
SEEN CONTACT LOCAL LAW ENFORCEMENT. 

$$

On 29 September 2012, the city of White Cloud, Michigan issued a shelter in place order due to an escape of 2 inmates from the Lake County jail.

BULLETIN - EAS ACTIVATION REQUESTED
LAW ENFORCEMENT WARNING
EMERGENCY MANAGEMENT
RELAYED BY NATIONAL WEATHER SERVICE GRAND RAPIDS MI
1030 PM EDT SAT SEP 29 2012

THE FOLLOWING MESSAGE IS TRANSMITTED AT THE REQUEST OF THE
EMERGENCY MANAGEMENT.

CITY OF WHITE CLOUD RESIDENTS...PLEASE LOCK ALL YOUR DOORS
IMMEDIATELY. POLICE ARE SEARCHING FOR TWO ESCAPED INMATES FROM THE
LAKE COUNTY JAIL WHO HAVE BEEN SIGHTED IN WHITE CLOUD. BOTH
SUSPECTS ARE WHITE MALES WEARING WHITE T-SHIRTS AND BLUE JEANS.
ONE IS 5 FOOT 10 INCHES TALL AND 155 POUNDS WITH RED HAIR AND BLUE
EYES. THE OTHER IS 5 FOOT 11 INCHES TALL AND 185 POUNDS WITH BROWN
HAIR AND BLUE EYES. IF YOU HAVE ANY INFORMATION PLEASE CONTACT
NEWAYGO COUNTY CENTRAL DISPATCH AT 2 3 1 8 6 9 5 2 8 8.

$$

On 13 September 2015, an alert was issued by the Texas Emergency Management Agency in Amarillo, Texas, in conjunction with the Claude Police Department, regarding a wanted fugitive in Armstrong County, Texas.

321 
WOUS44 KAMA 132121
LEWAMA
TXC011-140130-

URGENT - IMMEDIATE BROADCAST REQUESTED
LAW ENFORCEMENT WARNING
TEXAS EMERGENCY MANAGEMENT AGENCY AMARILLO TEXAS
RELAYED BY NATIONAL WEATHER SERVICE AMARILLO TX
421 PM CDT SUN SEP 13 2015

THE FOLLOWING MESSAGE IS TRANSMITTED AT THE REQUEST OF THE ARMSTRONG
COUNTY EMERGENCY MANAGEMENT OFFICE.

THE ARMSTRONG COUNTY SHERIFFS OFFICE AND CLAUDE POLICE DEPARTMENT
REQUEST A BE ON THE LOOKOUT FOR AN HISPANIC MALE WITH BRAIDED HAIR AND
A NECK TATTOO THAT HAS ESCAPED AND POSES A DIRECT THREAT TO THE
RESIDENTS OF CLAUDE AND ALL OF ARMSTRONG COUNTY. LAW ENFORCEMENT
AGENCIES IN ARMSTRONG COUNTY REQUEST THAT ALL RESIDENTS LOCK THE
DOORS OF THEIR VEHICLES AND THEIR HOMES IN THE EVENT THAT THIS
SUSPECT HEADS TO THE TOWN OF CLAUDE. THIS SUSPECT IS CONSIDERED ARMED
AND DANGEROUS AND POSES AN IMMEDIATE THREAT TO THE RESIDENTS OF
CLAUDE AND ALL OF ARMSTRONG COUNTY.

$$

SCHNEIDER

On 23 May 2023, Berkeley County 911 Communications in South Carolina issued an alert for an escaped fugitive.

205 
WOUS42 KCHS 232319
LEWCHS
SCC015-240119-

BULLETIN - EAS ACTIVATION REQUESTED
Law Enforcement Warning
SC Berkeley County 911 Communications
Relayed by National Weather Service Charleston SC
719 PM EDT Tue May 23 2023

...LAW ENFORCEMENT ACTIVITY...

The following message is transmitted at the request of Berkeley
County 911 Communications.

LAW ENFORCEMENT HAS SPOTTED A FUGATIVE NEAR HALF WAY CREEK AND
UNITED DR.  WHITE MALE MID 30'S 5' 9'' 150 LBS LAST SEEN IN BLUE
SHORTS GREY SHIRT. IF SEEN CALL 800-CALLFBI.

IF SEEN CALL 800-CALLFBI.

&&

LAT...LON 3292 7985 3292 7986 3293 7990 3297 7987
      3297 7990 3305 7990 3308 7991 3311 7990
      3313 7987 3316 7982 3317 7976 3313 7965
      3302 7974 3300 7976 3298 7978 3295 7978
      3295 7979 3293 7982 3293 7983

$$

IPAWSOPEN2017540523_071912/Actual

On Independence Day 2026, due to dry conditions posing a fire danger, the Baca County Office of Emergency Management issued a stage 1 burn ban.

006 
WOUS45 KPUB 042124
LEWPUB
COC009-052119-

BULLETIN - EAS ACTIVATION REQUESTED
Law Enforcement Warning
CO Baca County Office of Emergency Management
Relayed by National Weather Service Pueblo CO
324 PM MDT Sat Jul 4 2026


The following message is transmitted at the request of Baca County
Office of Emergency Management.

Baca County Stage 1 Fire Ban in effect until further notice. No
fireworks or outdoor burning allowed in unincorporated areas. Very
dry with windy conditions and extreme fire danger. Baca County
Sheriffs Department and Springfield Police Department will issue
citations for any illegal fireworks within incorporated areas.
Citations will be issued for any fireworks or open burning in
unincorporated areas. Propane grills allowed if always attended
and fire extinguisher present. Stay safe and aware. Call 9 1 1
immediately to report any fire or other emergency.

$$

17832002920001395473010
