= Emergency Action Termination =

The Emergency Action Termination (SAME code: EAT) was a message carried by the Emergency Alert System (EAS), and was also carried by the Emergency Broadcast System (EBS). The Emergency Action Termination was meant to cancel a previously issued Emergency Action Notification. It was discontinued as an event code by the FCC in 2012 and EANs are now treated as any other warning (except they are mandatory to relay).
