= Civil emergency message =

Emergency alert in the United States

A civil emergency message (SAME code: CEM) is a warning issued through the Emergency Alert System (EAS) in the United States to warn the public of a significant in-progress or imminent threat or danger to public safety. It is typically issued by a local or state authority and is relayed by the National Weather Service. The warning has a higher priority than a local area emergency (LAE), but it's less specific than a civil danger warning (CDW); however, both a LAE and a CDW often are in effect for specific areas. For example, the warning could be used to describe an alert issued by the National Terrorism Advisory System.

== Test civil emergency message ==
612 
WOUS46 KMTR 171900
CEMMTR
CAC097-171915-

BULLETIN - EAS ACTIVATION REQUESTED
CIVIL EMERGENCY MESSAGE
CA SONOMA COUNTY DEPARTMENT OF EMERGENCY MANAGEMENT
RELAYED BY NATIONAL WEATHER SERVICE SAN FRANCISCO CA
1200 PM PDT TUE AUG 17 2021

...CIVIL EMERGENCY MESSAGE...

THE FOLLOWING MESSAGE IS TRANSMITTED AT THE REQUEST OF SONOMA
COUNTY DEM.

TEST. TEST. TEST. THE FOLLOWING CIVIL EMERGENCY MESSAGE TEST IS
TRANSMITTED AT THE REQUEST OF THE SONOMA COUNTY DEPARTMENT OF
EMERGENCY MANAGEMENT. IF THIS HAD BEEN AN ACTUAL EMERGENCY...
INFORMATION ON WHAT TO DO WOULD BE HEARD HERE. NO ACTION IS
REQUIRED AS PART OF THIS TEST. REPEATING... NO ACTION IS REQUIRED
AS PART OF THIS TEST. FOR MORE INFORMATION... PLEASE GO TO
SOCOPSA.ORG OR CALL 2-1-1. THIS HAS BEEN A TEST OF THE NOAA
WEATHER RADIO... IN SUPPORT OF SONOMA COUNTY DEPARTMENT OF
EMERGENCY MANAGEMENT.

$$

ONSOLVE-94FAD40F58724B3DA7994CA28A0682FC/CA SONOMA COUNTY FIRE AND
EMERGENCY SERVICES DEPARTMENT

== Evacuation-related civil emergency messages ==
On April 18, 2020, the City of Grand Prairie Emergency Management issued an evacuation order due to a natural gas fire in the city of Grand Prairie, Texas.

026 
WOUS44 KFWD 181702
CEMFWD
TXC439-181915-

BULLETIN - EAS ACTIVATION REQUESTED
CIVIL EMERGENCY MESSAGE
CITY OF GRAND PRAIRIE EMERGENCY MANAGEMENT
RELAYED BY NATIONAL WEATHER SERVICE FORT WORTH TX
1202 PM CDT SAT APR 18 2020

THE FOLLOWING MESSAGE IS TRANSMITTED AT THE REQUEST OF THE CITY
OF GRAND PRAIRIE EMERGENCY MANAGEMENT.

A LARGE NATURAL GAS FIRE IS IN PROGRESS NEAR MAYFIELD RD AND FORUM
DRIVE IN GRAND PRAIRIE. EMERGENCY MANAGEMENT OFFICIALS HAVE
REQUESTED THE IMMEDIATE EVACUATION OF ALL RESIDENCES AND
BUSINESSES IN THE FOLLOWING AREAS... 

IF YOU LIVE BETWEEN MAYFIELD ROAD AND INTERSTATE 20 AND BETWEEN 
HWY 360 AND GREAT SW PARKWAY YOU ARE ADVISED TO EVACUATE
IMMEDIATELY TO THE EAST OR WEST USING EITHER INTERSTATE 20 OR
MAYFIELD ROAD.

$$

On March 29, 2021, a wildfire prompted an evacuation order for residents in Rapid City, South Dakota.

732 
WOUS43 KUNR 292012
CEMUNR
SDC103-300815-

BULLETIN - EAS ACTIVATION REQUESTED
CIVIL EMERGENCY MESSAGE
PENNINGTON COUNTY EMERGENCY MANAGEMENT
RELAYED BY NATIONAL WEATHER SERVICE RAPID CITY SD
212 PM MDT MON MAR 29 2021

THE FOLLOWING MESSAGE IS TRANSMITTED AT THE REQUEST OF THE
PENNINGTON COUNTY EMERGENCY MANAGEMENT.

A WILDFIRE IS BURNING JUST WEST OF RAPID CITY. RESIDENTS OF
DARK CANYON ROAD AND MAGIC CANYON ROAD ARE ASKED TO EVACUATE 
IMMEDIATELY INTO RAPID CITY. A RECEPTION CENTER HAS BEEN SET UP AT
SOUTH BAPTIST CHURCH. ALL OTHERS SHOULD AVOID THIS AREA. FOLLOW 
THE INSTRUCTIONS OF YOUR LOCAL EMERGENCY MANAGEMENT OR LAW 
ENFORCEMENT OFFICIALS.

CALL THE 2 1 1 HELPLINE FOR ADDITIONAL INFORMATION.

$$

On February 5, 2023, a 1-mile evacuation was issued in response to a Norfolk Southern derailment in East Palestine, Ohio.

175 
WOUS41 KPBZ 060310
CEMPBZ
OHC029-060340-

BULLETIN - EAS ACTIVATION REQUESTED
Civil Emergency Message
OH Columbiana County Board of Commissioners
Relayed by National Weather Service Pittsburgh PA
1010 PM EST Sun Feb 5 2023

...Evacuation...

The following message is transmitted at the request of Columbiana
County Board of Commissioners.

The evacuation zone is 1 mile from derailment located at 1020 E.
Taggart in East Palestine Ohio.

The evacuation zone is 1 mile from derailment located at 1020 E.
Taggart in East Palestine Ohio.

$$

WENS_IPAWS_CONNECT202315221036/WENS IPAWS

== Blue Alerts issued as civil emergency messages ==
On May 30, 2018, the state of Tennessee issued a Blue Alert for a suspect responsible for the fatal shooting of a Dickson County deputy.

481 
WOUS44 KMEG 301543
CEMMEG
TNC005-017-023-033-039-045-047-053-069-071-075-077-079-095-097-
109-113-131-157-167-183-301845-

URGENT - IMMEDIATE BROADCAST REQUESTED
CIVIL EMERGENCY MESSAGE
TENNESSEE EMERGENCY MANAGEMENT AGENCY MEMPHIS TENNESSEE
RELAYED BY NATIONAL WEATHER SERVICE MEMPHIS TN
1043 AM CDT WED MAY 30 2018

THE FOLLOWING MESSAGE IS TRANSMITTED AT THE REQUEST OF THE
TENNESSEE BUREAU OF INVESTIGATION NASHVILLE TENNESSEE.

...CIVIL EMERGENCY MESSAGE FOR A BLUE ALERT FOR TENNESSEE...

THE TENNESSEE BUREAU OF INVESTIGATION HAS ISSUED A STATEWIDE
TENNESSEE BLUE ALERT FOR STEVEN JOSHUA WIGGINS. WIGGINS IS LISTED
AS A PERSON OF INTEREST BY THE DICKSON COUNTY SHERIFF'S OFFICE AND
THE TENNESSEE BUREAU OF INVESTIGATION NASHVILLE TENNESSEE IN THE
SHOOTING DEATH OF A DICKSON COUNTY DEPUTY ON MAY 30TH, 2018.
WIGGINS SHOULD BE CONSIDERED ARMED AND DANGEROUS.

IF YOU HAVE INFORMATION CONCERNING WIGGINS, PLEASE CONTACT THE
TENNESSEE BUREAU OF INVESTIGATION NASHVILLE TENNESSEE AT
1 8 0 0 T B I F I N D. 

$$

On August 9, 2021, the state of North Carolina issued a Blue Alert for a suspect responsible for the injury of a Forest City police officer.

697 
WOUS42 KRAH 091903
CEMNC 
NCC000-092203-

BULLETIN - EAS ACTIVATION REQUESTED
CIVIL EMERGENCY MESSAGE
NC NORTH CAROLINA DEPARTMENT OF PUBLIC SAFETY
RELAYED BY NATIONAL WEATHER SERVICE RALEIGH NC
303 PM EDT MON AUG 9 2021

...EAS CIVIL EMERGENCY MESSAGE...

THE FOLLOWING MESSAGE IS TRANSMITTED AT THE REQUEST OF FL.

THE NC STATE HIGHWAY PATROL HAS ISSUED A BLUE ALERT FOR AN ASSAULT
ON A LAW ENFORCEMENT OFFICER WITH THE FOREST CITY POLICE
DEPARTMENT. THE OFFICER WAS INJURED ON AUGUST 9 AT 0830 AT 287
HARMON ST. THE FOREST CITY POLICE DEPARTMENT IS SEARCHING FOR
AKEIL KELIS OMAR FRANKLIN. BLACK MALE 20 YOA 5 FT 6 IN 120 LBS
LAST SEEN WEARING A BLUE JACKET AND JEANS. SUSPECT HAS A CROSS
TATTOO BETWEEN HIS EYES AS WELL AS CROSS TATTOO ON HIS LEFT ARM
AND A TATTOO OF OMAR ON HIS LEFT ARM. NO VEHICLE HAS BEEN
ASSOCIATED WITH SUSPECT AT THIS TIME. LAST SEEN IN THE ARE OF 287
HARMON ST. IF YOU HAVE ANY INFORMATION REGARDING THIS ASSAULT YOU
ARE ASKED TO CALL FOREST CITY POLICE DEPARTMENT AT 828-245-5555 OR
911 OR STAR HP.

$$

NC.001_649_2021-08-09T15:03:54-04:00/NC.001_649_2021-08-09T15:03:5
4-04:00

== Public safety civil emergency messages ==
Following the Space Shuttle Columbia disaster on February 1, 2003, the Texas Division of Emergency Management in Austin, Texas issued a reminder to Texas residents to avoid touching the debris from the space shuttle following its disintegration.

000 
WOUS44 KEWX 011653
CEMSAT
TXC013-019-021-029-031-053-055-091-123-127-137-149-163-171-177-187-
209-255-259-265-271-285-287-299-323-325-385-453-463-465-491-493-507-
011800-

BULLETIN - EAS ACTIVATION REQUESTED
CIVIL EMERGENCY MESSAGE
TEXAS DIVISION OF EMERGENCY MANAGEMENT AUSTIN TX
RELAYED BY NATIONAL WEATHER SERVICE AUSTIN/SAN ANTONIO TX 
1052 AM CST SAT FEB 1 2003

THE FOLLOWING MESSAGE IS TRANSMITTED AT THE REQUEST OF THE TEXAS 
DEPARTMENT OF PUBLIC SAFETY.

...SPACE SHUTTLE DEBRIS...

CITIZENS SHOULD STAY AWAY FROM SPACE SHUTTLE DEBRIS AND REPORT 
LOCATION OF DEBRIS TO LOCAL LAW ENFORCEMENT. AGAIN...CITIZENS SHOULD 
STAY AWAY FROM SPACE SHUTTLE DEBRIS.

$$

On August 4, 2010, residents in Sioux Falls, South Dakota were urged to conserve water due to concerns of sewer backups and to only consume water for drinking purposes.

790 
WOUS43 KFSD 050128
CEMFSD
SDC099-050430-

BULLETIN - IMMEDIATE BROADCAST REQUESTED
CIVIL EMERGENCY MESSAGE
SOUTH DAKOTA EMERGENCY MANAGEMENT AGENCY SIOUX FALLS SOUTH DAKOTA
RELAYED BY NATIONAL WEATHER SERVICE SIOUX FALLS SD
828 PM CDT WED AUG 4 2010

THE FOLLOWING MESSAGE IS TRANSMITTED AT THE REQUEST OF THE SOUTH
DAKOTA EMERGENCY MANAGEMENT AGENCY SIOUX FALLS SOUTH DAKOTA.

SIOUX FALLS RESIDENTS WEST OF INTERSTATE 29 MUST STOP WATER USAGE
IMMEDIATELY. PLEASE STOP FLUSHING TOILETS...WASHING CLOTHES...AND
USING SHOWERS. ONLY USE WATER FOR DRINKING PURPOSES. WATER DOES
NOT NEED TO BE BOILED. DISCONTINUE ALL OTHER USES OF WATER. THERE
IS AN ISSUE WITH THE SANITARY SEWER SYSTEM...WHICH MAY CAUSE SEWER
BACKUPS IN THE AFFECTED AREA. POTENTIAL SEWER BACKUPS WILL OCCUR
FROM AN AREA BOUNDED TO THE NORTH...FROM THE NORTH MINNESOTA
AVENUE WATER PLANT...TO THE SOUTH BY 26TH STREET. THE EASTERN
BOUNDARY IS ALONG MINNESOTA AVENUE AND THE WESTERN BOUNDARY ALONG
WESTERN AVENUE. RESIDENTS IN THE AFFECTED AREA SHOULD WORK TO MOVE
CRITICAL ITEMS FROM THEIR BASEMENTS...TO HIGHER ELEVATIONS UNTIL
PUBLIC WORKS CAN FIX THE PROBLEM. IN ADDITION...SANITARY SEWAGE IS
BEING DISCHARGED INTO THE BIG SIOUX RIVER SOUTH OF WEST 12TH
STREET. RESIDENTS SHOULD STAY OUT OF THE BIG SIOUX RIVER AND
PARKS ADJACENT TO THE RIVER...INCLUDING BIKE TRAILS. DISCHARGES
INTO COVELL LAKE AND OVERLAND NORTH OF FALLS PARK ARE ALSO
OCCURRING. RESIDENTS ARE ADVISED TO STAY OUT OF THESE AREAS.

$$

97

On April 20, 2022, the state of North Dakota issued a statewide Silver Alert for a missing senior adult.

840 
WOUS43 KBIS 201801
CEMBIS

BULLETIN - EAS ACTIVATION REQUESTED
Civil Emergency Message
North Dakota Highway Patrol
Relayed by National Weather Service Bismarck ND
101 PM CDT Wed Apr 20 2022 /1201 PM MDT Wed Apr 20 2022/

...SILVER ALERT...

This Silver Alert is being transmitted at the request of the
North Dakota Highway Patrol and North Dakota BCI. Beverly Ann
Battagler of Hunter, North Dakota is a 69 year old white female.
She is five feet seven inches tall, weighs 200 pounds and has
brown graying medium length hair and blue eyes.  

Her last known whereabouts was on April 20, 2022 between 7 am and
9 am in Hunter, North Dakota. She is believed to be driving a 
white 2005 Dodge Caravan with North Dakota License Plate 4 8 2 A Y
T.

She was last seen wearing a teal winter jacket, black pants, and 
a navy blue shirt with polka dots on the collar.

If you have any information regarding this incident, please
contact Cass County Sheriff Department at 701 241 5800.

The above Silver Alert information is available by calling
5 1 1 and at www.ndresponse.gov/alert.

$$

Telken
