= Fire warning =

Fire statement indicating an observed wildfire in the warned area

A fire warning (SAME code: FRW) is a warning issued through the Emergency Alert System (EAS) in the United States by civil authorities to inform the public of major, uncontrolled fires (usually wildfires) threatening populated areas and/or major roadways. A red flag warning (issued by the National Weather Service when low relative humidity and high winds and temperatures are expected) will generally precede any fire activity by at least one to two days. A fire warning will generally include information on the location and movement of the fire, evacuation instructions, and shelter locations.

== Example ==
BULLETIN - EAS ACTIVATION REQUESTED
FIRE WARNING
BORGER OFFICE OF EMERGENCY MANAGEMENT
RELAYED BY NATIONAL WEATHER SERVICE AMARILLO TX
317 PM CDT FRI APR 13 2018

THE FOLLOWING MESSAGE IS TRANSMITTED AT THE REQUEST OF THE BORGER
OFFICE OF EMERGENCY MANAGEMENT.

RESIDENTS NEED TO EVACUATE THE NORTH SIDE OF FRITCH IMMEDIATELY
AROUND THE ARROWHEAD OR NORTH OF TEXAS HIGHWAY 136. NO EVACUATION
CENTERS HAVE BEEN SET UP AT THIS TIME. PLEASE FOLLOW ORDERS FROM
YOUR LOCAL OFFICIALS.

$$

== See also ==
- Red flag warning
- Specific Area Message Encoding
