= National Emergency Message =

National activation of the Emergency Alert System

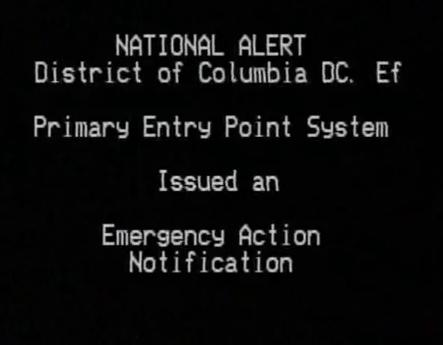
Screen seen on cable TV systems, using the Trilithic EASyPLUS, announcing a national test of the Emergency Alert System using the former Emergency Action Notification protocol, November 9, 2011

A National Emergency Message (SAME code: EAN), previously known as an Emergency Action Notification (1971 - circa 2022), is the national activation of the Emergency Alert System (EAS) used to alert the residents of the United States of a national or global emergency such as a nuclear war or any other mass casualty situation. This alert can only be activated by the president of the United States or a designated representative thereof, such as the vice president. The Emergency Broadcast System (EBS) also carried the Emergency Action Notification. Except for the 2011 national test, which utilized the Emergency Action Notification alert type, no president has overseen a situation serious enough to issue the National Emergency Message.

== Operation ==
National Emergency Messages are treated the same as any other message transmitted over the Emergency Alert System, except that stations are required to relay them. When a message is received, the receiver is to open an audio channel to the originating source until the End of Message (EOM) tones are received. After the EOM is received, stations will return to normal programming in order to broadcast immediate news coverage of the event.

Formerly, stations would not resume broadcast until an Emergency Action Termination (SAME code: EAT) was issued.

== Background ==
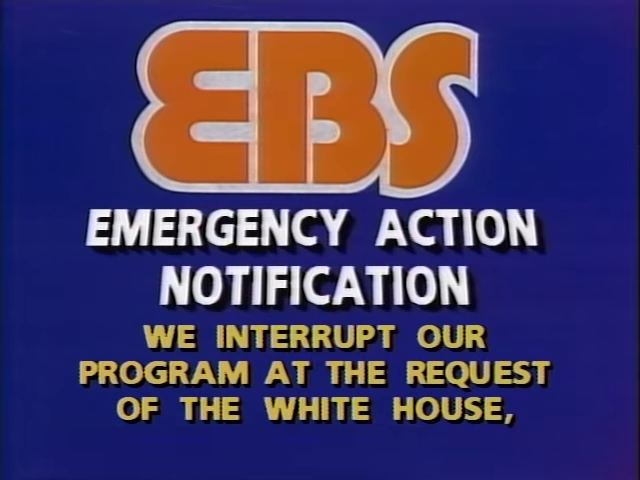
Video slide from a prerecorded stand-by script announcement of an EAN from WGN-TV, Chicago, in 1985, during the period of the Emergency Broadcast System. This EAN announcement was never seen on the airwaves of WGN-TV itself (although a version for tests was) but was posted to YouTube in March 2017.

The term "Emergency Action Notification" was created when the Emergency Broadcast System went into place in 1963. Before the mid-1970s, this was the only non-test activation permitted (the same rule also applied to the earlier CONELRAD system). The EAN signifies a national emergency, as the wording shows. The Office of Civil Defense originally created the term for the national emergency notification enactment. FEMA soon took over after its creation, which further lead to the development of the modern Emergency Alert System.

In its multi-decade history, however, the Emergency Alert System's EAN code has only been formally activated once: a test in 2011. The alert ensured all Primary Entry Points (PEPs) were to receive the EAN and properly send the alert, and that all stations monitoring the PEP relayed properly. The test ended up being notoriously inaudible, with other EAS units audible in the background of the original test audio. Since this alert, all national tests have been under the NPT (Nationwide Test of the Emergency Alert System, formerly known as National Periodic Test) SAME code, beginning in 2016.

In 2022, the FCC revised the Emergency Action Notification code to read "National Emergency Message." This change, along with many other revisions to the Emergency Alert System, was made to "improve the clarity and accessibility of alerts."

== Past operation ==
Unlike other messages, the EAN was not the alert itself, but rather a notice that the activation is beginning. After the End of Message (EOM) tones were sent, normal programming did not resume. Instead, most stations were to broadcast emergency information in a specific priority order. Messages from the President are always broadcast first. Next comes local messages, statewide and regional messages, and finally national messages not originating from the President. (Note: Some documents refer to these as "messages from the National Information Center (or NIC)". While there is a SAME code for this type of message (NIC), there exists no FCC definition of the National Information Center.) When an EAN was initially received, and during any time a new message was not available, an FCC mandated standby script was used (and repeated). Other stations, which held special permission from the FCC, would sign off until the end of the EAN.

Normal programming would not continue until the transmission of an Emergency Action Termination message (SAME code: EAT).

== False alarms ==
A properly authenticated Emergency Action Notification was incorrectly sent to United States broadcast at 9:33 a.m. Eastern Standard Time on February 20, 1971. At the usual time, a weekly EAN test was performed. NORAD teletype operator W.S. Eberhardt had three tapes in front of him: a test tape, and 2 tapes indicating a real emergency, instructing the use of EAN Message #1, and #2, respectively. He accidentally used the wrong tape, with codeword "HATEFULNESS". This message ordered stations to cease regular programming immediately, and begin an Emergency Action Notification using Message #1. Message 1 states that regular programming has been interrupted at the request of the United States government, but is not specific about the cause. A cancellation message was sent at 9:59 a.m. EST, but the message's codeword, "HATEFULNESS" again, was incorrect. A cancellation message with the correct codeword, "IMPISH", was not sent until 10:13 a.m. EST. After 40 minutes and six incorrect or improperly formatted cancellation messages, the accidental activation was officially terminated.

On April 21, 1997, several television and radio stations in Florida, Hawaii, Louisiana, and Ohio mistakenly received a false EAN. Early indications pointed to a human error at the National Emergency Coordination Center in Virginia that routed a test requested by a relay for the Chicago area to test out one radio station's then-new EAS equipment.

On June 26, 2007, an EAN was accidentally activated for the state of Illinois, when new satellite delivery equipment for the EAS was accidentally left connected to a live network during what was meant to be a closed-circuit test.

On October 24, 2014, Bobby Bones' syndicated radio program broadcast audio from the 2011 national test of the EAS (the only one that was coded as an EAN) during a segment where he ranted over his local Fox affiliate's scheduling of an EAS test during a World Series game. The broadcast triggered the EAS on some broadcasters and cable systems. The program's distributor iHeartMedia was fined $1 million by the FCC for the incident.

In 2016 or 2017, KUCO-LD in the Sacramento Valley area of California conducted an unauthorized test of the EAS. However, the message read in Spanish said that the activation was for an Emergency Action Notification relaying from station K20FZ. It was due to a wrong video cartridge being inserted instead of an EAS test cartridge.
