= List of FIPS region codes =

This is a list of FIPS 10-4 region codes, using a standardized name format, and cross-linking to articles. The list is broken up into alphabetical sections.

ABC – DEF – GHI – JKL – MNO – PQR – STU – VWXYZ

On September 2, 2008, FIPS 10-4 was one of ten standards withdrawn by NIST as a Federal Information Processing Standard. It is to be a neutral replacement for ISO 3166.

== See also ==
- List of FIPS country codes
- ISO 3166-2
- Nomenclature of Territorial Units for Statistics (NUTS)
- Canadian Location Code, the Canadian equivalent, in weather forecasting and emergency alerts

== Sources ==
- FIPS 10-4 Codes and history
  - Last version of codes
  - All codes (include earlier versions)
  - Table to see the evolution of the codes over time
- Administrative Divisions of Countries ("Statoids"), Statoids.com
