= FIPS county code =

Five-digit standard code for counties in the US

The Federal Information Processing Standard Publication 6-4 (FIPS 6-4) is a five-digit Federal Information Processing Standards code which uniquely identified counties and county equivalents in the United States, certain U.S. possessions, and certain freely associated states.

On September 2, 2008, the US Department of Commerce, following three years of review and comments from "public, research communities, manufacturers, voluntary standards organizations, and Federal, State, and local government organizations", announced that FIPS 6-4 was one of ten FIPS standards withdrawn by the department's National Institute of Standards and Technology (NIST). Deemed "obsolete, or have not been updated to adopt current voluntary industry standards, federal specifications, federal data standards, or current good practices for information security", the NIST replaced FIPS 6-4 with "INCITS 31 – 2009" codes for the "Identification of the States and Equivalent Areas within the United States, Puerto Rico, and the Insular Areas".

The five-digit codes of FIPS 6-4 used the two digit FIPS state code (FIPS Publication 5-2, also withdrawn on September 2, 2008), followed by the three digits of the county code within the state or possession. County FIPS codes in the United States are usually (with a few exceptions) in the same sequence as alphabetized county names within a state. They are usually (but not always) odd numbers, so that new or changed county names can be fit in their alphabetical sequence slot.

In response to the NIST decision, the U.S. Census Bureau announced that it would replace the FIPS 6-4 codes with the INCITS 31 codes after the 2010 census, with the Census bureau assigning new codes as needed for their internal use during the transition. The Census Bureau decided that, based on decades of using the terminology FIPS to describe its codes, it would continue to use the FIPS name for its updated codes, where FIPS now stood for FIP "Series", since there no longer existed an official FIP "Standard".

FIPS county codes are still used by the Emergency Alert System (EAS) and NOAA Weather Radio (NWR) to define geographic locations for their SAME-based public alerting systems. In this application, a "0" (zero) is added as the first digit and used as a "placeholder", making each FIPS code a six-digit sequence. In the future, the first digit may be utilized in this numerical scheme to represent a predefined county subdivision.

== See also ==
- County (United States)
- Federal Information Processing Standards
