= History of The Weather Channel =

The Weather Channel is an American basic cable and satellite television channel owned by Byron Allen's Entertainment Studios that focuses on national and international weather information - although in recent years, the channel has also incorporated entertainment-based programs related to weather on its schedule. This article details the history of the channel, which dates back its founding to around 1980.

== Prelaunch ==
Prior to the channel's launch, the original concept for providing continuous weather reports to the public over television stations stretched as far back as the late 1950s and early 1960s on the varying incarnations of CATV. Through those systems, which typically brought in up to a dozen stations to the viewer from across the region, twelve slots on a cable dial would frequently leave a few vacancies.

To take advantage of the unused bandwidth early cable providers devised a system where a single black and white camera, often one that had seen former service in local news production but was unused after an upgrade, would be placed on a rotating pedestal, capturing various dials and gauges on different stations. These channel feeds (to which the camera would pan automatically, remaining in a given view for a few seconds before moving on) largely featured the time, temperature, barometric pressure, wind speed, wind direction, and wind chill factor. Slides with the day's complete forecast, brief news headlines, and community events often drawn up by the station's art department rounded out the package. This was à similar system to that used by early devotional channels for the "Stations of the Cross" during the Christmas season.

The Weather Channel itself was the brainchild of veteran television meteorologist John Coleman (former chief meteorologist at WLS-TV in Chicago and Good Morning America forecaster), who took his idea to Frank Batten, the then-chief executive officer of Landmark Communications. A major part of the plan for the new network was that it would be able to provide localized weather information to its viewers. This would be done through the use of specialized computer units, known as WeatherStars ("STAR" being an acronym for "Satellite Transponder Addressable Receiver"), which would be installed at the headends of cable providers that agreed to carry the channel. These WeatherStars were able to insert current local conditions, forecasts and weather warnings over the national feed, with the weather data being received from the vertical blanking interval of the TWC video feed and via satellite, which is then transmitted to the WeatherStar unit; the WeatherStar systems would also be capable of adding or removing segments seen during each local forecast segment, and providing other forms of non-forecast data (primarily local contact and address information for businesses advertised on the channel's national feed, which the STAR unit overlaid on a static graphic seen after certain commercials). The Weather Channel, Inc. was founded in Atlanta, Georgia on July 18, 1980.

== The early years (May 1982–March 1986) ==
The Weather Channel launched on Sunday, May 2, 1982. Programming began with an introduction to the channel by Batten and Coleman, which led into an inauguration ceremony that launched the channel's first official broadcast at 8:00 p.m. Eastern Time that evening, anchored by meteorologists Bruce Edwards and André Bernier. The channel originally focused on strictly providing weather reports and other meteorological information for the United States and other countries. The Weather Channel originally gathered its national and regional forecasts from the National Oceanic and Atmospheric Administration (NOAA) and its local forecasts were sourced from the various National Weather Service Weather Forecast Offices around the country. After only one year in the role, in 1983, John Coleman was forced out as the channel's president and CEO; at that time, he returned to his previous occupation as a television weather anchor, first becoming employed at WCBS-TV in New York City.

The original Weather Star I model often interfered with the channel 2 signal at the cable headend; this issue was fixed with the upgrade to the Weather Star II in January 1984. The channel later rolled out Weather Star III, the third-generation STAR unit, to cable providers – which began upgrading to the system in early 1986; the Star III included additional hardware improvements, and also added several extra forecast and observation features.

== "You Need Us, The Weather Channel, For Everything You Do" (June 1986–March 1991) ==
On June 29, 1986, The Weather Channel switched to an anchor format, and was relaunched as The New Weather Channel. Meteorologist Charlie Welsh said "Good afternoon everyone and welcome to The New Weather Channel. We're covering the weather for you everything you do". The campaign included a custom lyrical theme (which was remixed in 1989) – two versions of which were created: a full one-minute theme that was rarely seen on-air, and a more commonly seen 30-second version. In 1989, the channel introduced Prime Time Tonight, a three-minute segment that appeared eight times daily from 7:57 to 11:27 p.m., which served as guide to programs airing on other cable channels and provided airtime information and video clips.

1990 saw the introduction of the first Weather Star 4000 models, which similar to the Weather Star III, originally generated only text-based products. Radar imagery was added to the units in June of that year, with graphical backgrounds being introduced in July, making the 4000 the first STAR to be capable of generating graphics and the first to incorporate the channel's logo in the forecast segments. Also in 1990, The Weather Channel began including snow condition reports at five minutes after the hour.

== "Weather You Can Always Turn To" (March 1991–February 1996) ==
Largely considered the height of the classic TWC by enthusiasts, The Weather Channel underwent a major graphical revamp (with the introduction of a new slogan, "Weather You Can Always Turn To") on March 6, 1991. Graphic elements included heavy use of gradients and the Caxton typeface. On July 3, The Weather Channel Connection, a toll-free phone service providing weather information, was launched. Originally 1-900-288-8800, the phone number was reassigned in 1992 to 1-900-WEATHER (or 1-900-932-8437), a number was also used to promote the service in on-air and print advertisements. On November 1, The Weather Channel filed for a trademark on TWC, a common shortening of the name that was sometimes seen on-air.

By 1993, The Weather Channel was available to 90% of U.S. households with cable television service. On January 10, 1994, TWC placed an order to build 1,000 units for a new STAR model known as the Weather Star Jr, a budget model developed by Wegener Communications, which builds equipment for cable headends.

1995 brought a variety of changes to TWC, setting the stage for more changes that occurred the following year. Minor graphical tweaks were made, while local forecast segments began incorporating Short Term Forecasts issued by local National Weather Service offices as the "Local Update" (which in turn destabilized flavor lineups and caused the discontinuation of narration). The 30-Day Outlook was discontinued by the National Weather Service (which required TWC to discontinue the product). New programs included the introductions of WeatherScope (a top/bottom of the hour weather discussion) and a special on how weather affected the 1941 attack on Pearl Harbor on December 7. That year also featured the premiere of Sky on Fire, a documentary on lightning. The music of Trammell Starks, used on Weatherscan and emergency cases since 2000, premiered at the end of the year with Starks' various other music pieces being used by the channel until early 2012.

== Major modernization (February 1996–March 1998) ==
The WeatherScope title screen between 1996 and 1998.

In two years, The Weather Channel dramatically changed its on-air presentation. The first wave of change came on February 15, 1996, with the introduction of a new slogan ("No Place on Earth Has Better Weather"), that was heralded with a trio of humorous spots promoting the accuracy of TWC's weather coverage. On April 15 of the same year, The Weather Channel received its biggest graphical overhaul since 1991, the modernization of TWC's presentation included the introduction of a newer, flatter logo (although its previous logo remained in use on some segments, and some specialty segments retained narration by Dan Chandler and/or the previous TWC logo into late 1997), as well as a new graphics package featuring rotating globes and compass points for introductions, and new music. 1996 also saw the launch of The Weather Channel's website, weather.com. "Local on the 8s", a concept in which local forecasts aired in ten-minute intervals at times ending in "8," beginning at eight minutes past the hour, also made its debut. The first iteration of "Local on the 8s" was somewhat short-lived, only lasting until early 1998. The concept was later revived in December 2001, and remains in use by TWC to this day.

The Weather Channel logo used from 1996 to 2005; this logo was still used on the Weather Star 4000.

On October 15, 1996, Landmark Communications purchased a building at 300 Interstate North (near the junction of Interstates 75 and 285 in Atlanta) to house The Weather Channel's operations. Landmark had been looking for new studio facilities for the channel, and requirements included 18-foot ceilings. Improvements were made to bring the building up to code before TWC moved into its new headquarters at the end of 1996 (but it did not begin broadcasting from the facility until early 1997). By 1996, The Weather Channel reached 63 million homes, with average ratings totaling at 130,000 viewers at that time.

On March 31, 1997, the channel revised its programming schedule with the introduction of a news wheel format. On August 25, the channel debuted a memorable advertising campaign, The Front, created by ad agency TBWA Chiat/Day. The promos (which used the slogan, "Weather Fans, You're Not Alone") were set in something akin to a sports bar, with the major difference being that weather was the central focus. That October, 1997 World Series became the first major event that TWC covered with live reporters. New title bars were introduced for national segments on January 6, 1998.

== The second wave of change (March 1998–June 2001) ==
An example of the graphics seen on The Weather Channel from 1998 to 2001.

On March 11, 1998, TWC introduced a graphical refresh, featuring heavy use of the Akzidenz-Grotesk typeface and footage of clouds at the core of the new identity (though maps with the new look had been in use since January of that year). For the first time in the channel's history, there was no slogan or unifying theme, aside from an oval symbol with a crescent shape seen frequently in graphics (such as the Weather Center titlecard on the right), and show/segment intros utilizing isobars as a graphical element. WeatherScope was replaced with Weather Center, a program which essentially comprised The Weather Channel's entire 24-hour daily programming schedule at the time in the form of three separate programs (Weather Center AM, a morning program focusing primarily on business, commuter and leisure travel weather; Weather Center PM, an evening program with a focus on forecasts for the day ahead; and an afternoon broadcast simply using the Weather Center title, which focused on ongoing weather conditions). April 1998 saw updates to "The Front" image campaign; one of the new advertisements specifically mentioned the 36-hour text forecasts (which, at the time, were still supplied by the National Weather Service), but heralded new Local Forecast graphics. The machine that produced those graphics, the IRIX-based Weather Star XL, was released to cable providers later that year as the first new mainline STAR unit manufactured in eight years. The catalyst for a top-to-bottom modernization of the local forecast segment, the XL's graphical and technological capabilities were significantly more advanced than the 4000, with an animated, high-quality output consistent with TWC's national graphics and new scalable icons that would be used for eight years on TWC (these icons remain in use by Weather Star XLs still in service and on certain downloadable web widgets).

1999 brought the removal of the unpredictable-length Local Update product on the Weather Star 4000, which stabilized flavor lineups. Also in 1999, The Weather Channel launched a spin-off network called Weatherscan Local (now Weatherscan), a channel offering continuous weather information 24 hours a day, which exclusively provided local forecasts generated by specialized STAR units. Originally exclusive to Comcast systems, cable operators could add optional packages featuring expanded weather information or specialty forecasts (such as golf, boat and beach, or marine weather) to their Weatherscan STAR systems. The Weather Channel also appointed Decker Anstrom to serve as president of the network. By 1999, The Weather Channel reached 70 million homes, or 98% of all households that subscribe to cable television. It also provided radio forecasts to more than 250 radio stations and weather information to 52 newspapers. Between 1999 and 2000, TWC aired weather observation reports from Mount Everest using battery-powered sensors.

In 2000, the channel's Weather Star XL systems introduced an audio function, Vocal Local, which assembles narration tracks heard during local forecast segments to introduce forecast products, and read descriptive forecasts and primary weather observations; while most cable operators added the Vocal Local feature, some did not employ it on their Weather Star XL units. The cycling of music playlist changes was increased from a quarterly to a monthly basis; as such, 2000 is considered to be the year the split between the "classic" TWC and "modern" TWC occurred by several websites. On August 23 of that year, the channel debuted Atmospheres, a weekly newsmagazine-style program hosted by Jim Cantore and Mishelle "Mish" Michaels. Also in 2000, The Weather Channel starting moving away from showing 24/7 Weather Center with the introduction of two new morning programs: First Outlook (5-7am) and Your Weather Today (7-9am). Weather Center AM now only broadcast from 9am to noon on weekdays, however it continued to air full-time on weekends until early 2001.

In 2001, Weatherscan introduced forecast products compiled by TWC, which replaced the zone forecasts sourced from National Weather Service forecast offices. Whereas the NWS forecasts were produced for various U.S. jurisdictions (counties, parishes and boroughs), the new TWC forecasts focused on more individual areas, beneficial to multi-county viewing zones served by one STAR. In May 2001, TWC launched "Rays Awareness", an initiative focused on sun safety, in conjunction with the Centers for Disease Control and American Academy of Dermatology.

== The "Live By It" era (June 2001–August 2005) ==
On June 25, 2001, The Weather Channel introduced completely redesigned introductions for its local forecast segments and forecast programs, as well as a new slogan ("Live By It"). The separate morning Weather Center AM and nighttime Weather Center PM programs were also discontinued, with Weather Center becoming a single general program rather than existing in the form of three separate daypart-specific editions, having been significantly pared down with the introduction of new programs such as Evening Edition (weeknights 9pm-3am (including long-form programs) and Weekend Now (weekends 5-11am). The Weather Star XL received a graphical refresh for the first time in September 2001, which included the introduction of different colors on text boxes, a new cloud background, improved regional forecast and radar maps, and new title bars and fonts that, as with the previous version, matched the on-air graphics that were used by TWC at the time.

In April 2002, the TWC-compiled local forecasts introduced the previous year on Weatherscan replaced the forecasts sourced by the National Weather Service on the WeatherStar systems. As NWS bulletins/warnings were included in the old forecasts, a Weather Bulletins page was introduced that displays the applicable watches, warnings and advisories (on WeatherStar 4000 units, The Weather Channel incorporates National Weather Service bulletins in the text-based local forecast, as the 4000 does not feature the Weather Bulletins slide among its products). TWC celebrated its 20th anniversary in May 2002; in honor of the event, the channel premiered a retrospective special, as well as a book chronicling the channel's history, The Weather Channel: The Improbable Rise of a Media Phenomenon, written by TWC founder Frank Batten and Jeffrey L. Cruikshank and published by Harvard Business Press.

The first long-form programs debuted on The Weather Channel at the beginning of 2003, with Storm Stories becoming the first program that was not weather or a documentary-type special. Also in 2003, the "Live By It" campaign was refreshed slightly. Weatherscan received a new graphical design in February and moved to a modern STAR platform, known as the IntelliStar. The FreeBSD-based IntelliStar is more flexible than the IRIX-based Star XL for making software and product updates. Plans to revive "The Front" as a weather discussion board were proposed and scrapped that year.

STAR systems were introduced and decommissioned during 2004. The IntelliStar systems began to be rolled out to various cable providers around the U.S. to generate The Weather Channel's local forecasts and Lower Display Line. The Weather Star III was also discontinued from service as it did not meet DTMF tone and weather warning regulations. In October 2004, the United States Postal Service and TWC teamed up to create stamps depicting clouds and an accompanying "Cloudscapes" educational campaign – aimed at kids in grades 3 through 5 – to help learn about cloud types to tell of pending weather conditions that was sent to 200,000 educators around the U.S., was unveiled at the Blue Hill Observatory in Boston, Massachusetts.

== "Bringing Weather to Life" (August 2005–June 2008) ==
The current Weather Channel logo, used since August 15, 2005.

In early 2005, The Weather Channel announced that it would undergo a major branding refresh in August. The rebranding was part of a long-running effort aimed at reducing the network's dependence on "commodity" viewers (those looking for forecast information) and attracting what then-TWC president Patrick Scott calls "vitalists" (those with an active interest in weather) and "planners" using the channel to plan the week. The new look officially debuted on August 15, 2005, at 5:00 a.m. Eastern Time, which included the debut of a simplified square logo with the FF Meta font and a new slogan ("Bringing Weather to Life"). Additional long-form programs were also introduced, such as the climate-focused The Climate Code with Dr. Heidi Cullen (later renamed Forecast Earth) and It Could Happen Tomorrow.

In May 2007, The Weather Channel celebrated its 25th anniversary. To commemorate the event, select past Weather Channel promotional campaigns were featured on-air during commercial breaks; a modified 25th anniversary edition of its logo was also used. On June 17 of that year, TWC entered into an exclusive partnership with MSNBC to provide weather content for the msnbc.com website. On September 26, The Weather Channel launched a high-definition simulcast feed; it also introduced a major refresh for the IntelliStar, with new titles and backgrounds on October 23.

2008 started with uncertainty, as reports surfaced about sexual harassment allegations regarding on-camera meteorologist Bob Stokes. Fellow TWC meteorologist Hillary Andrews filed a lawsuit against The Weather Channel in Cobb County district court alleging the abuse by Stokes (in which she alleged Stokes made suggestive statements to her such as "will you lick my swizzle stick" and that TWC "covered [the harassment] up"). Andrews won her lawsuit that May, and was awarded an undisclosed amount of money. During the proceedings, it was revealed that Melissa Barrington, who co-anchored alongside Stokes before Andrews was assigned the duties, was also harassed by Stokes. At the same time, Landmark Communications announced it would be selling most of its assets, including broadcast television stations, newspapers, The Weather Channel, and data center facilities.

== Sale to NBC/Bain/Blackstone consortium and transition to high-definition (June 2008–November 2013) ==
The current Weather Channel High Definition logo debuted 2008

On June 2, 2008, The Weather Channel unveiled its first major modernization since 2005. This included the introduction of new graphics and opening title sequences for every TWC program, a new lower display line for IntelliStar units that incorporates tabs (another first) to serve as a rundown for the forecast data being shown on the LDL, and a full thrust into the channel's new high definition studio and set. By August 12, the channel stopped broadcasting its forecast programming from its former studio facilities at the Cumberland headquarters, which would eventually be converted into offices.

On July 7, 2008, NBC Universal and private equity firms The Blackstone Group and Bain Capital purchased The Weather Channel and all related assets (including weather.com, Weather Services International and a 30% stake in Canadian company Pelmorex) from Landmark Communications for $3.5 billion. Later, Landmark announced it was halting the sales of most of the other properties except for one newspaper; The Weather Channel was the only property sold by Landmark (the company would resume the sale of its other remaining assets beginning in 2012, concluding with the 2014 sale of KLAS-TV in Las Vegas to the Nexstar Broadcasting Group). As a result of its new association with NBC, live programming such as Your Weather Today began featuring live video content sourced from the network's owned-and-operated and affiliated stations to provide supplementary coverage during significant weather events, as well as live or videotaped field reports from reporters employed by local NBC stations. TWC personalities and on-camera meteorologists, such as Jim Cantore and Mike Seidel, have also appeared on NBC News and MSNBC since the sale.

In September 2008, TWC launched a new program airing from 4:30am to 5am every weekend, Sunrise Weather, presented by Ray Stagich alongside Mike Seidel on Saturdays and Alex Wallace on Sundays. It had the shortest runtime and placed more emphasis on straightforward forecasts than most other TWC shows. However, it was one of the channel's lowest-viewed show (as it broadcast in weekend early slot).

In November 2008, The Weather Channel became part of NBC Universal's "Green is Universal" campaign to promote environmental awareness. The channel utilized a green version of its logo for use during the campaign; IntelliStar systems were sent an update that allowed them to display the logo when the campaign is ongoing during November and April (which is normally done from master control on other networks). Ironically, in the middle of "Green Week" (on November 20), The Weather Channel instituted major layoffs – described as cost synergies – including three active on-camera meteorologists and one former one, as well as of the marketing department, the Road Crew (originally including Jeff Mielcarz, although Mielcarz later appeared on some weather.com video forecasts in December 2008), significant portions of the TWC Radio Network, and the Forecast Earth/environmental unit (however, certain portions of the Forecast Earth unit remain with TWC). The layoffs took effect on November 30 (The Weather Channel later stated it would air other environmental programs).

With the shutdown of NBC Weather Plus that month as a result of NBC Universal's partial acquisition of The Weather Channel, certain meteorologists from the digital broadcast network were eventually integrated into TWC's on-camera weather staff; forecasting, radar and graphics systems used by other NBC Universal television news properties (including NBC News, CNBC and MSNBC) replaced the Weather Plus-branded banner graphics to fit The Weather Channel's graphics scheme. Meteorologists that were employed with NBC Weather Plus continued to be based from NBC Universal's corporate headquarters at Rockefeller Center in Manhattan, and appeared often on MSNBC until the 2009 closure of the entire division. One of the motives for the cuts was in order to aid a $500 billion budget cut at NBC Universal's parent company General Electric; NBC Universal and CNBC also made cuts to slash their budgets.

In February 2009, The Weather Channel laid off four on-camera meteorologists. Midway through the month, it was discovered by members to a TWC fan forum and a leak on the channel's media kit that The Weather Channel would radically revamp its schedule; between February 21 and March 1, TWC would drop four programs (Evening Edition, Abrams & Bettes: Beyond the Forecast, Forecast Earth and Weekend Outlook), while dramatically revamping Weather Center and reassigning meteorologists Mike Bettes and Stephanie Abrams to host the block of the program that replaced Beyond the Forecast. It had already been announced that Storm Stories would return as part of "Tornado Week", a seven-day event featuring original specials and episodes of its original programs centering on tornadoes. The program changes were some of the most far-reaching since 2003, which saw the creation of programs such as Day Planner and PM Edition. In March 2009, TWC personalities and programs dramatically ramped up use of Twitter – at the same time, other NBC Universal properties (especially MSNBC) did the same; programs now regularly feature tweets submitted by viewers.

On March 5, 2009, TWC appointed Geoffrey Darby as Executive Vice President of Programming and Production. Under Darby, Abrams and Bettes were reassigned to host Your Weather Today; First Outlook was reduced by one hour to make way for Wake Up With Al, a new weather and entertainment program hosted by Today weather anchor Al Roker; the jazz music long featured during the channel's local forecast segments was also dropped and replaced with instrumental rock music at Darby's request; this particular change was even confirmed by Chris Geith, the only remaining jazz artist whose music was featured in the forecast playlists, who stated that TWC had sent out a request proposing the creation of production music branded with a common signature for the channel. TWC began showing weekly movies related to weather on Friday nights, beginning with the October 30, 2009, telecast of The Perfect Storm (other films aired by the channel, some of which had only marginal ties to weather at best, included March of the Penguins and Misery); this particular decision was heavily criticized by many viewers and media analysts. The move to air movies on TWC had been planned for some time, even before the NBC/Blackstone/Bain acquisition. After December 2009, these weekly movies were temporarily replaced by the primetime edition of Weather Center, which already aired in the time period during the rest of the work week. Despite the controversy, the Friday night film block returned on March 26, 2010, with the broadcast of Into Thin Air; additional viewer criticism stemming from both the broadcast of movies on a news and information channel and an incident during an April 2010 tornado outbreak in which a scheduled broadcast of the movie Wind aired instead of wall-to-wall severe weather coverage, resulted in TWC deciding to permanently drop its film block in May 2010.

In January 2011, TWC announced that Australian-born landscape photographer Peter Lik would be starring in a new half-hour action-adventure nature reality series, From the Edge with Peter Lik, which debuted on March 31 and is produced by NBC's in-house production unit, Peacock Productions. Lik also served as a special contributor for TWC, providing segments from his frequent travels to weather-impacted locales.

Later in 2011, the Intellistar 2, the first STAR unit capable of generating high definition graphics, began to be gradually rolled out to cable providers across the country. The Intellistar 2 is strictly used to generate data and graphics for the "Local on the 8s" segments seen on the high definition feed, while the first-generation Intellistar remains in use to provide weather information on The Weather Channel's standard definition feed.

The Weather Channel marked the 30th anniversary of its launch in May 2012. In August 2012, former CNN meteorologist Reynolds Wolf joined TWC as a weather forecaster.

On July 1, 2013, Eric Fisher left the network. On September 6 of the same year, Crystal Egger left the network. On the same night, Chris Warren and Jim Cantore counted down Crystal for a special Top 5.

== "It's Amazing Out There" (November 2013–present) ==
On November 12, 2013, at 4:00am during Weather Center Live (anchored by Jen Carfagno and Alex Wallace), The Weather Channel implemented a new graphics package on the Intellistar and IntelliStar 2 that closely resembles the graphical display of a mobile app. The LDL's display was also extended to be shown during commercial breaks (except for those locally inserted by cable providers) and long-form programming. In addition, First Forecast, Day Planner, On the Radar, Sunrise Weather, Weekend View and Weekend Now (respectively weekdays from 4-5:30 a.m., 11 a.m.-2 p.m. and 5-8 p.m. and weekends from 4:30 a.m.-2 p.m.) were all merged into the Weather Center Live umbrella title, as certain other editions of that program (specifically, the weekend 4:00 and 7:00 p.m., and nightly 10:00 p.m. and 1:00 a.m. Eastern Time broadcasts) were simultaneously replaced by additional long-form programming. A new set also debuted, replacing the high-definition capable set introduced in 2008. The Weather Channel also debuted three new slogans: "It's Amazing Out There", "Weather All The Time", and Get Into The Out There.

On December 2, 2013, The Weather Channel announced that Good Morning America weather anchor Sam Champion would be joining the network, serving as both the channel's weather editor and as an on-camera meteorologist. On March 17, 2014, Champion began hosting a new morning program on the channel, America's Morning Headquarters, which replaced Morning Rush on that date.

On January 14, 2014, DirecTV became the first major pay television provider to drop The Weather Channel, as a result of the channel and the satellite provider being unable to come to terms on a new carriage agreement. TWC was substituted in its DirecTV channel slot (on channel 362) by WeatherNation TV (which traces its roots to The Weather Cast, a short-lived network that was intended to replace TWC on Dish Network due to a similar carriage dispute in May 2010 that was later resolved; DirecTV originally began carrying WeatherNation on the adjacent channel 361 on December 31, 2013); representatives for DirecTV stated that it added WeatherNation TV in response to subscriber complaints regarding the amount of reality programs on The Weather Channel, which it estimated had amounted to 40% of its daily schedule. On April 8, 2014, The Weather Channel and DirecTV both settled on a new agreement that in addition to restoring the channel to DirecTV on channel 362 the following day (although DirecTV would not restore the red button feature that allows subscribers to access TWC-supplied local forecasts until May 2, 2014), also resulted in the channel's decision to trim the amount of reality programming on its weekday schedule in half (relegating it to the nighttime hours daily and on weekend afternoons) in response to subscriber complaints regarding the decrease of forecast programming.

On April 21, 2014, popular meteorologist Dave Schwartz returned to The Weather Channel after a nearly six-year absence, but he died on July 30, 2016, due to cancer. On March 10, 2015, Verizon FiOS pulled The Weather Channel and its sister network Weatherscan after the provider and The Weather Company were unable to come to terms on a new carriage agreement; both channels were respectively replaced by the AccuWeather Network (which launched on March 13) and a widget provided by FiOS featuring forecast content provided by WeatherBug. Verizon cited the wide availability of the internet and mobile apps for consumers to access on-demand weather content as the reason for dropping TWC and its services. Finally, on June 24, 2019, The Weather Channel returned to Verizon Fios after a four-year absence.

On August 20, 2019, The Weather Channel updated its graphics for the first time since November 2013, which resulted in the removal of the "L" bar and also, a new graphics package optimized for the 16:9 widescreen format. As a result, TWC is now broadcast in near-full screen 16:9; all programs, including live forecast programming, is now aired completely in the format.

=== Shift away from long-form programming ===
The late-summer of 2015 saw the start of extensive changes to The Weather Channel's schedule and operations. First on August 24, the channel premiered Weather Underground, a two-hour early-evening program hosted by Mike Bettes and Alex Wilson, which is co-branded with the sister website of the same name (which was purchased by The Weather Company in 2012), featuring an in-depth look at the mechanisms of weather. On September 1, Vivian Brown announced that she would be departing The Weather Channel after 29 years, having worked at the channel since 1986. Then on September 2, 2015, The Weather Channel announced that it would cancel Wake Up with Al after six years on October 2 (with Al Roker remaining with the channel to contribute to its breaking weather news coverage).

On September 9, 2015, the channel announced a major phased overhaul of its programming schedule – which involves a gradual return to a forecast-based lineup – beginning with the announcement of a format revamp of AMHQ, with the program's host Sam Champion being moved to prime time on November 2 in an undefined role, while Stephanie Abrams would co-host AMHQ (as a result of the cancellation of Wake Up with Al, on which Abrams had been a co-host, The Weather Channel also announced that it would cease production from its New York City studio at Rockefeller Center due to the prohibitive rental costs). The network also announced plans to stop greenlighting original long-form programming, and expand live forecast programming on its schedule during 2016 once all remaining long-form programs already in development conclude their runs. In a memo sent out to network staff by Weather Company CEO David Kenny, it cited the refocusing towards weather-based programs was done on the basis that "our most passionate fans come to us for the weather and the science behind the weather, not our original shows."

As part of the overhaul, The Weather Company would lay off around 50 of TWC's employees (or 3% of the channel's 1,400 staff members), including production, engineering and financial staff, while overall spending for the television channel would be reduced to focus more on the company's internet and mobile properties. The channel also announced that it would launch Local Now, a localized weather, traffic and news service similar in format to Weatherscan, that is intended for distribution to over-the-top streaming services operating similarly to traditional pay television providers (such as Sling TV).

== Sale to Entertainment Studios ==
On March 22, 2018, Byron Allen's Entertainment Studios announced its intent to acquire The Weather Channel's television assets from an NBCUniversal/Blackstone Group partnership. The actual value is undisclosed, but was reported to be around $300 million; the channel's non-television assets, which were separately sold to IBM two years prior, were not included in the sale.

== See also ==
- NBCUniversal
- Landmark Media Enterprises
- Entertainment Studios
