= Maria LaRosa =

American meteorologist (born 1976)

- Born: November 7, 1975 (age 50); New York, U.S.
- Education: Pennsylvania State University
- Occupation: Meteorologist for WNBC-TV
- Years active: 1998-present
- Spouse: Mariusz Kolakowski
- Children: 3

Maria LaRosa is an American meteorologist. Since July 2019, she has worked as a meteorologist on WNBC-TV New York and is a substitute weather presenter on NBC's Today.

Previously, she worked for The Weather Channel in Atlanta, Georgia. She co-hosted America's Morning Headquarters with Sam Champion and Mike Bettes from 2014 to 2015. She hosted Weekend Recharge with Paul Goodloe until September 23, 2018.

== Early life and career ==
LaRosa was born in New York state, but was raised in Ramsey, New Jersey. In June 2004, she joined KYW-TV in Philadelphia, Pennsylvania. She was later hired by WXIX-TV, the Fox Broadcasting Company station in Cincinnati, Ohio. She was the weekday morning and noon meteorologist for KYW-TV in Philadelphia. She was a meteorologist and presenter for WTVM-TV, the ABC station in Columbus, Georgia. In 2010, she joined The Weather Channel and became an on-camera meteorologist for both Weekend Now and PM Edition with her co-host Todd Santos. In March 2012, she left to do the 5:30 to 6:00am edition of First Outlook and Your Weather Today from 9:00 to 10:00am (EST).

She hosted Wake Up With Al from 5:30 to 7am with Stephanie Abrams, Al Roker and Mike Bettes (2012–2014), Morning Rush from 7 to 10am with Abrams and Bettes (2010–2014), and America's Morning Headquarters (2014–2015). Her last day on The Weather Channel was September 23, 2018.

== Career timeline ==
- 1998–2000: WTVM-TV meteorologist
- 2000–2004: WXIX
- 2004–2010: KYW-TV weekday morning and noon meteorologist
- 2010–2018: The Weather Channel
  - 2010–2012: Weekend Now co-presenter
  - 2010–2012: PM Edition Weekend co-presenter
  - 2012: First Outlook co-presenter
  - 2012: Your Weather Today co-presenter/fill-in
  - 2012–2014: Morning Rush co-presenter/fill-in
  - 2012–2014: Wake Up With Al segment correspondent/fill-in
  - 2014–2015: America's Morning Headquarters co-presenter
  - 2015–2018: Weekend Recharge co-host/Weather Center Live fill-in
- 2019–present: NBC
  - 2019–present: WNBC meteorologist - Today in New York
  - 2019–present: Weekend Today/NBC News fill-in weather presenter

== Education ==
LaRosa graduated in 1998 from Penn State University with a Bachelor of Science degree in meteorology. She was also a teaching assistant for the university's introductory meteorology course before graduating in 1998.

She is a member of the National Weather Association and the American Meteorological Society (AMS). She holds a seal of approval as a certified broadcasting meteorologist.

== Personal life ==
She once lived in South Jersey with her husband, Mariusz Kolakowski. They have three sons: Michael (born in 2005), Justin (born in 2008) and Tyler (born May 3, 2010).
