= List of programs broadcast by The Weather Channel =

This is a list of television programs broadcast by the American television network The Weather Channel.

There are four main types of programs on The Weather Channel: weather news programs, serial documentaries, Long-form shows, and specials such as the 100 Biggest Weather Moments, Top 100 Weather Moments, and Coast Guard: HMS Bounty.

== Programs ==
=== Current programs ===
==== News ====
Title	Duration on Network
America's Morning Headquarters	2014-present
Weather Unfiltered	2015-present
Weekend Recharge	2015-present
Pattrn	2022-present

==== Long-form ====
Title	High definition?	References
3 Scientists Walk Into a Bar	Yes	
American Supernatural	Yes	
Deadline to Disaster	Yes	
Fat Guys in the Woods	Yes	
Highway Thru Hell	Yes	
Natural Born Monsters	Yes	
Prospectors	Yes	
Secrets of the Earth	Yes	
So You Think You'd Survive?	Yes	
Storm of Suspicion	Yes	
Strangest Weather on Earth	Yes	
Storm Stories	Yes (cancelled)^{1}	
Top 10	Yes	
Tornado 360°	Unknown	
Tornado Alley	Yes	
Tornado Road	Unknown	
Weather Caught on Camera	Yes	
Weather Gone Viral	Yes	
Weird Earth	Yes	
Why Planes Crash	Yes	
World's Deadliest Weather	Yes	

Note 1: Episodes premiering before 2009 are in standard definition; episodes premiering since 2009 air in high definition.

=== Former programs ===
Title	Genre	High definition?	Runtime
23.5° with Sam Champion	News	Yes	2016
Abrams & Bettes: Beyond the Forecast	News	Yes	2006-2009
Afternoon Outlook	News	No	2003-2006
Atmospheres	Long-form	No	2000-2003
Cantore Stories	Long-form	Yes	2009-2010
Catching Hell	Long-form	Yes	2014
Coast Guard Alaska	Long-form	Yes	2011-2015
Coast Guard Cape Disappointment	Long-form	Yes	2013-2014
Coast Guard Florida	Long-form	Yes	2012-2013
Cold Water Captains	Long-form	Yes	2014
Day Planner	News	Yes	2003-2013
Deadliest Space Weather	Long-form	Yes	2013-2014
Epic Conditions	Long-form	Yes	2007-2009
Evening Edition	News	Yes	2001-2009
Exposures	Long-form	No	1995-1997
Freaks of Nature	Long-form	Yes	2014-2015
From The Edge with Peter Lik	Long-form	Yes	2011
Forecast Earth	Long-form	Yes	2003-2009
Forecasting the End	Long-form	Yes	2013
First Forecast	News	Yes	2012-2013
First Outlook	News	Yes	2000-2012
Full Force Nature	Long-form	Yes	2006-2012
Hacking the Planet	Long-form	Yes	2013
Hawaii Air Rescue	Long-form	Yes	2012-2013
Heavy Metal Monsters	Long-form	Yes	2013
Hurricane 360	Long-form	Yes	2014
Hurricane Hunters	Long-form	Yes	2012
Ice Pilots	Long-form	Yes	2012
Iceberg Hunters	Long-form	Yes	2012
Iron Men	Long-form	Yes	2012
It Could Happen Tomorrow	Long-form	No	2006-2008
Lava Chasers	Long-form	Yes	2013-2014
Loaded	Long-form	Yes	2013
Lifeguard! Southern California	Long-form	Yes	2012-2013
Morning Rush	News	Yes	2012-2014
On The Radar	News	Yes	2012-2013
Overnight Outlook	News	No	2003-2005
Plane Xtreme	Long-form	Yes	2012
PM Edition	News	Yes	2003-2012
Prime Time Tonight	Programming guide	No	1988-1991
Pyros	Long-form	Yes	2012
Raging Nature	Long-form	Yes	2014
Reel Rivals	Long-form	Yes	2013
Storm Center	Long-form	Yes	2021-2024
Storm Riders	Long-form	Yes	2011-2013
Storm Wranglers	Long-form	Yes	2016-2019
Sunrise Weather	News	Yes	2008-2013
Tipping Points	Long-form	Yes	2013-2014
Turbine Cowboys	Long-form	Yes	2012
Twist of Fate	Long-form	Yes	2011-2013
Wake Up With Al	News	Yes	2009-2015
Weather Center	News	Yes	1998-2009
Weather Center Live	News	Yes	2009-2021
Weather: PM Edition	News	Yes	
Weather: PM Edition Weekend	News	Yes	
Weather Proof	Long-form	Yes	2009-2010
Weather Scope	News	No	1995-1998
Weather Ventures	Long-form	Yes	2007-2009
Weekend Now	News	Yes	2001-2013
Weekend Outlook	News	Yes	2003-2009
Weekend Planner	News	No	2003-2005
Weekend View	News	Yes	2005-2013
Weather That Changed the World	Long-form	Yes	2013
When Weather Changed History	Long-form	Yes	2008-2009
Your Weather Today	News	Yes	2000-2012
