= Weather Center Live =

- Logo used since November 12, 2013
- Also known as: Weather Center (2009–2011); The Weather Channel LIVE (electronic programming guides)
- Presented by: Chris Warren; Jacqui Jeras
- Theme music composer: Killer Tracks (2011–2013)
- Opening theme: “Investigative Smackdown” (2011–2013)
- Country of origin: United States
- Original language: English

Production
- Production locations: Atlanta, Georgia
- Camera setup: Multi-camera
- Running time: 4 hours

Original release
- Network: The Weather Channel
- Release: March 2, 2009 – November 12, 2021

Weather Center Live (originally titled Weather Center) is an American weather news television program that aired on The Weather Channel from 2009 until 2021. Airing in various timeslots throughout the daytime (and sometimes nighttime) hours and serving as The Weather Channel's de facto flagship forecast program, it features weather forecasts, analysis and weather-related feature segments. This program, the current incarnation of Weather Center (which differs in format from the version that debuted in 1998), debuted on March 2, 2009.

== Program history ==
=== 1998–2006 ===
Weather Center debuted in 1998 (replacing WeatherScope) and was originally formatted as a program devoted to hard weather news. It had three main blocks: Weather Center AM (focusing on business and leisure weather) from 5am to noon, Weather Center (focusing on ongoing conditions) from noon to 7pm, and Weather Center PM (focusing on coming days' forecasts) from 7pm to 5am. In 2000, with the additions of First Outlook and Your Weather Today, the program was reduced to daytime and evening broadcasts. Weather Center's presence on The Weather Channel's schedule decreased even further as additional forecast and long-form programs debuted; by the end of 2008, the program aired for only one hour a day during the week.

=== 2007–2009 ===
In February 2009, The Weather Channel's media kit began showing a different logo for the program; the most notable change to come from this, however, was the retitling of the program to Weather Center with Abrams & Bettes. Changes to electronic program guide schedules revealed that Weather Center would absorb the repeating overnight hour on weeknights, and that Weather Center would also be added to evenings (correlating with the merger of Evening Edition and Abrams & Bettes). The expansion of Weather Center reversed a trend of partitioning that took place between 1998 and 2003. The changes themselves were some of the most far-reaching since the 2003 addition of Day Planner, Afternoon Outlook and Weekend Outlook, itself a casualty, being replaced by Weekend View.

=== 2009–2011 ===
From May 5 to June 12, 2009, Mike Bettes left the studio to report on the Vortex 2 project, a project in which researchers spent five weeks in Tornado Alley (the region comprising the Great Plains and South Central United States that is the most climatologically favorable for tornado development) tracking tornadoes with weather researchers in an attempt to discover more information about the formation of these storms. Throughout the entire duration of the project, Bettes reported live in the field during Weather Center with Abrams & Bettes each evening, except for instances in which the Vortex 2 project was suspended for the day due to lack of tornadic activity. Several editions of the show featured Bettes and the Vortex 2 crew actively chasing potential tornado-producing supercells; on June 5, 2009, the crew caught its first and only tornado of the year live on PM Edition, the coverage of which spilled over into the beginning of Weather Center; both programs covered the entire tornado event without commercial interruption. While Bettes was reporting with the project crew, TWC on-camera meteorologist Adam Berg substituted for him in the studio.

The final edition of Weather Center with Abrams & Bettes aired 1½ weeks earlier on June 12, 2009, allowing Stephanie Abrams and Mike Bettes to take a week off from studio work prior to assuming their new duties as co-anchors of Your Weather Today starting on June 22, 2009. Alexandra Steele and Jim Cantore replaced them as anchors of the 7 p.m. Eastern hour of Weather Center on June 15, 2009 (although television listing services such as Zap2it stated that the changeover would occur one week later on June 22). Kevin Robinson, a former host of Your Weather Today, was added as an additional co-anchor of the program on June 22, 2009. On the same day, meteorologist Nicole Mitchell became Paul Goodloe's permanent co-host on the 10 p.m. Eastern hour of Weather Center. The 7–10 p.m. ET block at this time was called Weather Center with Cantore and Steele, similar to Your Weather Today's new subtitling as Your Weather Today with Abrams & Bettes.

In December 2009, Kevin Robinson left Weather Center with Cantore and Steele to become a meteorologist at Cincinnati NBC affiliate WLWT, and was replaced by Chris Warren. In late September 2010, Crystal Egger joined Weather Center as a full-time co-anchor. Jim Cantore was reassigned to report on breaking weather news from the channel's newsroom. In September 2010, Weather Center co-host Alexandra Steele left the network, and later became an on-camera meteorologist for CNN in early 2011. Nicole Mitchell left the program in November 2010, and was replaced by Kelly Cass.

=== 2011–2013 ===
On January 31, 2011, TWC unveiled a major shift in its evening programming. It began airing Weather Center in three one-hour blocks each night (at 7 p.m., 10 p.m. and 1 a.m. Eastern) surrounding the channel's long-form programming (a term referring to The Weather Channel's original documentary and reality programs). Weather Center was subsequently expanded to weekends on February 5, 2011. Chris Warren and Crystal Egger hosted the weekday editions; Paul Goodloe and Kelly Cass anchored on weekends.

In May 2011, Weather Center was officially retitled as Weather Center Live. On November 16 of that year, Weather Center Live debuted the "Winter Weather Update" segment, as a replacement for the "Tropical Update" segment usually seen at 50 minutes past each hour from June to November. The segment lasted until March 24, after which the slot is taken over by the "Severe Weather Update" segment, which airs at 50 minutes past the hour until the start of the Atlantic hurricane season on June 1.

An afternoon edition of Weather Center Live began airing at 4 p.m. Eastern starting on March 26, 2012. Six days later on March 31, the weekend edition also expanded to the 4 p.m. slot, effectively canceling PM Edition Weekend. The late afternoon edition of Weather Center Live was shifted to 5–7 p.m. Eastern on November 12, 2012.

=== 2013–2021 ===
In July 2013, Todd Santos left the program and The Weather Channel, and was replaced by Keith Carson.

Crystal Egger left the channel on September 6, 2013; Egger returned on September 12 to anchor an extended Weather Center Live edition from 1 to 3 a.m. ET due to severe weather, before leaving the network for good. Alexandra Wilson was reassigned from the weekend 4 p.m. edition of Weather Center Live to weeknights as Egger's replacement, being paired with Chris Warren and Jim Cantore during the 7 p.m. Eastern hour of the broadcast.

On November 12, 2013, Weather Center Live (presented by Jen Carfagno and Alex Wallace) debuted at 4 a.m. (as part of the show's expansion) and The Weather Channel's extensive rebranding started at this point (which included a revised graphics package, the introduction of a new set for its forecast programs and the permanent expansion of the Lower Display Line throughout national commercial breaks and long-form programming to provide local weather information). This was highlighted again during Morning Rush, which debuted at 7 a.m. the same day. Also, as a result of the changing schedule, First Forecast, On the Radar, Day Planner, Sunrise Weather, Weekend View and Weekend Now were all absorbed into WCL (weekdays 4–5:30 a.m., 11 a.m.-2 p.m. and 5–8 p.m.; weekends 4:30 a.m.-2 p.m. Eastern). As a consequence, the nightly 10 p.m. and 1 a.m. Eastern, and weekend 4 and 7 p.m. Eastern editions of Weather Center Live were replaced with long-form programming (effectively removing regularly scheduled forecast programs from the channel's nighttime schedule for the first time in its history, and also limiting forecast programming on weekends to morning and early afternoon timeslots). The show's duration can be extended, ultimately canceling longform original programs, and have its logo changed to red throughout major weather events.

On February 24, 2014, the 2–5 p.m. ET block now showed Weather Center Live. This addition occurred almost a month after The Weather Channel was removed from satellite provider DirecTV due to a carriage dispute, citing complaints over the channel's increased reliance on long-form programs over forecast programming; with the change, the channel's schedule consists solely of forecast programming during the daytime hours and long-form programs during nighttime hours on weekdays.

When Weather Center Live was expanded, Vivian Brown anchored the show from 11 a.m. to 2 p.m. ET with (Mon-Wed) Nick Walker and (Thu-Fri) Keith Carson. In July, Walker moved to primetime to cover breaking weather news and Carson went on to host WCL's 4–7 a.m. weekend edition and report for Wake Up With Al Monday through Wednesdays. Jennifer Delgado replaced them as Brown's co-host.

In April 2014, Dave Schwartz returned to the Weather Channel for the first time since 2008. He and Alex Wilson would anchor Weather Center Live from 2 to 5 p.m. ET (3 to 7 p.m. ET during severe weather) weekdays for the next two years.

On Thursday, November 6, 2014, the weekday 4–5:30 a.m. ET edition of Weather Center Live was replaced by long-form programming (from 4 to 5 a.m. ET) and an expanded Wake Up With Al (from 5 to 5:30 a.m. ET). On November 8, the weekend 4–5 a.m. and noon-2 p.m. ET editions of the show were also replaced by long-form programming. As a result of these changes, Weather Center Live aired from 11 a.m. to 8 p.m. ET on weekdays and 5 a.m.-noon ET on weekends.

On Monday, November 17, 2014, Weather Center Live added an extra edition on the 10 a.m. hour, replacing the rebroadcast of Wake Up with Al.

On February 7, 2015, the weekend 5–9 a.m. ET edition of the program was replaced by a new AMHQ Weekend, hosted by Reynolds Wolf and Kait Parker.

On March 14, 2015, the weekend 9 a.m.-noon ET edition was replaced by a new weekend show called Weekend Recharge, hosted by Maria LaRosa and Paul Goodloe, alongside expert Greg Postel. As a result, Weather Center Live became a weekday-only show, airing from 10 a.m. to 8 p.m. ET.

On August 24, the 6-8pm timeslot was replaced by a show called Weather Underground, hosted by Mike Bettes and Alex Wilson.

From the week of October 5, 2015, Wake Up with Al's timeslot was replaced with Weather Center Live.

During severe weather events, The Weather Channel may opt to replace the normal color scheme (blue, white and dark gray) of its graphics to become black-and-red (known as the "Storm Alert" mode), with the one-third of the "R"-bar featuring in-depth information of the event instead of the regular "rundown" list of segments. TWC has not used the Weather Center Live banner during such events since roughly 2015; instead, an alternative name that explicitly states the events (Winter Storm/Severe Storm/Hurricane Central) is used on-air. For rating purposes, WCL continues to be utilized as the umbrella title for TWC's extended broadcasts being done in this manner.

On July 30, 2016, Dave Schwartz died after a long battle with cancer. He had continued to appear as co-anchor almost until his death. He was 63.

On October 26, 2016, Liana Brackett joined The Weather Channel as an on-camera meteorologist. She began working with Chris Warren from 3-6pm on weekdays in January 2017.

On June 4, 2018, Weather Center Live was shortened an hour, now ending at 5pm ET with Weather Underground taking over that hour. Mark Elliot and Alex Wallace host from 9am-1pm ET and Chris Warren and Liana Brackett host from 1pm-5pm ET.

On April 21, 2018, Weekend Recharge, the weekend version of Weather Center Live, was extended to another hour, ending at 1pm. This is due to AMHQ shortened by one hour, now starting at 6am.

On December 2, 2018, Weather Center Live began to be known as The Weather Channel Live on, and only on, electronic program guide schedules.

On June 14, 2021, The show was shortened to noon to 4:00 p.m. Eastern Time as America's Morning Headquarters got extended until noon. Also, Weather Underground was extended to four hours, starting at 4pm.

On November 15, 2021, the show was replaced by Storm Center with a slightly different presentation, featuring on the schedule as Weather Underground's successor rather than predecessor.

== Notable on-air staff ==
=== Former ===
- Stephanie Abrams (currently co-anchors AMHQ)
- Mike Bettes (currently hosts Weather Unfiltered)
- Vivian Brown (left TWC)
- Crystal Egger (currently at KNBC-TV; TWC Correspondent)
- Dave Schwartz (deceased)
- Jim Cantore – Storm Specialist (currently co-hosts AMHQ)
- Bryan Norcross – Senior Hurricane Expert/Storm Specialist, now at WPLG.
