= Evening Edition =

- Country of origin: United States
- Original language: English

Production
- Production locations: Atlanta, Georgia
- Camera setup: Multi-camera
- Running time: 6 hours (4 hours on the air only)

Original release
- Network: The Weather Channel
- Release: August 20, 2001 – March 1, 2009

Related
- Weather Center

Evening Edition is an American weather program broadcast by The Weather Channel. Evening Edition included multiple hours of programming, cut into by long-form programs such as When Weather Changed History, as well as a repeating overnight hour designed for viewers on the West Coast.

It broadcast (including long-form programming) every weeknight from 9 p.m. to 3 a.m. ET.

== Program history ==
Evening Edition debuted in 2001, the first program to cut into the time slot of Weather Center, as part of a shift from 24-hour Weather Center to multiple focused programs that occurred during 2000 and 2001.

Because of long-form programs, Evening Edition aired its first hour, then long-form programs, then two hours, then long-form programs repeated from earlier, followed by the overnight hour (respectively from 9 to 10 p.m., 11 p.m. to 1 a.m. and 2 to 3 a.m. Eastern).

During the final five months of its run, the first hour of Evening Edition, aired at 8pm eastern (instead of 9pm eastern), was hosted by Stephanie Abrams and Mike Bettes and, for most intents and purposes, was an extension of the preceding program, Abrams & Bettes: Beyond the Forecast. The second and third hours were the main program, hosted by Jim Cantore, Paul Goodloe and Alexandra Steele.

The overnight hour aired live (at 2am) after the second hour of long-form programs (repeated from the first hour). It was hosted by one meteorologist and then was repeated until the next morning's first program (either First Outlook on weekdays or When Weather Changed History on weekends).

It was revealed via changes to electronic program guide systems and through an inadvertent image change on the Weather Channel media kit website that the show's time slots would be given to a relaunched version of Weather Center, which contains a mix of the traditional Evening Edition format as well as new segments. Weekends were also slated to feature PM Edition Weekend in place of Evening Edition, but only for three hours - it later turned out that Weather Center was to take this over too. The remainder of the weekend evenings now featured long-form programming.

Evening Edition’s final broadcast aired on March 1, 2009.

== Former Hosts ==
Weeknight East Coast Version

- Paul Goodloe - original and last official anchor
- Kim Cunningham (Perez) - original anchor; left October 2002 for First Outlook
- Jennifer Lopez - left in November 2004 for PM Edition, left TWC in June 2008 for KXAS-TV in Dallas, returned to TWC in April 2013
- Alexandra Steele - last official anchor

Weeknight West Coast Version

- Hillary Andrews - left TWC in September 2006
- Sandra Diaz
- Lisa Mozer
- Rich Johnson - departed November 2008
- Warren Madden
- Sharon Resultan - last official anchor; departed February 2009 to be a daytime fill-in; left TWC in March 2009
- Dave Schwartz - laid off by TWC in October 2008

Weekend Version

- Adam Berg - last official anchor; left The Weather Channel October 6, 2012
- Carl Parker - original anchor; left May 2002 for Weather Center from 6-8p ET (later PM Edition)
- Mike Bettes - left in September 2006 for Abrams & Bettes: Beyond the Forecast
- Kristin Dodd - last official anchor; laid off by TWC in February 2009
- Rick Griffin - left TWC in September 2003
- Sharon Resultan - original anchor; left in September 2006 for the weeknight west-coast version of Evening Edition
