= Weekend Now =

- Country of origin: United States

Production
- Production location: Atlanta
- Camera setup: Multi-camera
- Running time: 180 minutes

Original release
- Network: The Weather Channel
- Release: April 21, 2001 – November 10, 2013

Original Weekend Now logo, 2001-2003

Weekend Now title card, 2003-2005

Weekend Now (styled as WeekendNOW; originally styled as Weekend:Now) was a weekend weather program on The Weather Channel that aired from 11 a.m.-2 p.m. Eastern time on Saturdays and Sundays. The program, which originally featured unique segments including world weather, lifestyle-oriented weather, and light weather news, debuted in 2001 as the first of multiple weekend programs on The Weather Channel.

== Program history ==
Weekend Now launched in April 2001 on The Weather Channel as Weekend:Now, two months before the debut of the channel's "Live By It" campaign (even though promotions for the new campaign were already airing), as part of The Weather Channel's shift from one all-day program (that being Weather Center) to multi-hour shows with set hosts and tone. The show was unique at the time it was originally hosted by four on-camera meteorologists consisting of two teams, and broadcast from 7 to 11 a.m. ET. One team was Kelly Cass and Bill Keneely and the other team was Melissa Barrington and Bob Stokes. Any given hour of the program would be hosted by one team while a member of the other team provided special segments like the Travel Forecast and Weather Maker.

Graphics were distinct from the rest of The Weather Channel, using a blue-green color scheme - and most notably, the voiceovers of Bob Stokes and Kelly Cass for the local forecast introduction. Among the segments were World Weather Watch, a look at weather in Latin American countries with meteorologists from The Weather Channel Latin America; Weekend Wow!, where extraordinary weather would be featured; and local and national forecasts; and Weather Maker, where one of the on-camera meteorologists not hosting that particular hour would use a telestrator to explain the meteorological details behind the day's most important weather system.

In 2003, the show's format and timeslot was given to a new show titled Weekend Planner while Weekend:Now was renamed Weekend Now and aired from 11am-2pm Eastern Time. The show in the new timeslot, unlike the original program, contained much less in the way of special segments and was much more like other programs on the network such as Weather Center and PM Edition. Directly after the relaunch, the show retained some semblance of the original program, such as using the telestrator for the Travel segment, but by the time of the next network relaunch in 2005, the program had little if anything in common with its original format. On Saturday, June 7, 2008, the program began airing in high-definition.

Weekend Now was the longest-running of the three weekend-only weather programs on The Weather Channel at the time, as Weekend View was broadcast from October 1, 2005, to September 12, 2013, and Weekend Outlook, was aired between 2003 and 2009.

The show had its first official anchors in November 2004: Kevin Robinson and Kristina Abernathy. In September 2007, Abernathy left the show and was replaced by Jennifer Lopez. Shortly after that, in June 2008, Lopez left the show and was replaced by Kim Perez (now Kim Cunningham). In March 2009, Kim Perez left for PM Edition and Kevin Robinson left for Your Weather Today. Carl Parker and Heather Tesch replaced them beginning March 7, 2009. In November 2010, Parker and Tesch started anchoring Day Planner five days a week. Soon, Maria LaRosa and Todd Santos replaced them. In April 2012, Maria LaRosa left the show to host First Outlook and Your Weather Today. On April 14, 2012, Heather Tesch returned to Weekend Now as the new host, along with Todd Santos. Julie Martin joined the show in June 2012 as a digital media correspondent and hosting various segments on the show. Heather Tesch departed Weekend Now and Weather Center Live as well as The Weather Channel on October 30, 2012. Todd Santos also departed the show soon after for Weather Center Live. The new anchors of Weekend Now became Danielle Banks and Alex Wallace. In April 2013, Banks went on maternity leave. She returned to TWC in July 2013 as a fill-in. She was replaced by Alexandra Wilson.

September 8 was Alexandra Wilson's last day on Weekend Now. She went on to anchor Weather Center Live weeknights 7-8pm and 10-11pm to replace Crystal Egger. No anchor was announced to join Alex Wallace.

If there was an ongoing, significant weather event (severe weather outbreak, winter storm, hurricane threatening the U.S.), Weekend Now was extended one hour and finished at 3pm.

On November 10, 2013, Weekend Now aired its final broadcast after more than 13 years. It was replaced by the new all-day Weather Center Live program on November 16, as part of the 2013 relaunch of the Weather Channel.

=== Former hosts ===
- Kristina Abernathy (2004-2007) (now no longer at The Weather Channel)
- Danielle Banks (2012-2013) (left for maternity leave, returned to anchor Weather Center Live overnight)
- Kim Cunningham (Perez) (2008-2009) (left to anchor PM Edition; now no longer at TWC)
- Maria LaRosa (2010-2012) (left to anchor First Forecast and Morning Rush)
- Jennifer Lopez (2007-2008) (left The Weather Channel in 2008, but returned in 2013 and is now a fill-in)
- Carl Parker (2009-2010) (left to anchor Day Planner; departed to become Storm Specialist)
- Kevin Robinson (2004-2009) (left to anchor Your Weather Today, then departed to anchor Weather Center; then left The Weather Channel in December 2009; now at WLWT-TV)
- Todd Santos (2010-2012) (left for Weather Center Live)
- Heather Tesch (2009-2010, 2012) (left in November 2010 for Day Planner; returned in April 2012; left the show and departed The Weather Channel on October 30, 2012)
- Alex Wallace (2012-2013) (program cancellation)
- Alexandra Wilson (2013) (left for Weather Center Live)
