= Carfagno =

Carfagno is a surname. Notable people with the surname include:

- Edward Carfagno (1907–1996), American art director
- Jen Carfagno (born 1976), American television meteorologist

== See also ==
- Carfagna
