= Weekend View =

- Country of origin: United States

Production
- Camera setup: Multi-camera
- Running time: 360 minutes

Original release
- Network: The Weather Channel
- Release: October 1, 2005 – November 10, 2013

Weekend View was a weekend weather program on The Weather Channel that aired from 5-11 a.m. Eastern Time. Because of this timeslot, it can be considered the weekend equivalent to Morning Rush, although it aired for six hours in comparison to the three-hour time length of Morning Rush. Weekend View included local and national outlooks for the day as well as lifestyle segments. On November 10, 2013, Weekend View aired for the final time and was replaced by Weather Center Live.

== Program history ==
Weekend View's initial launch date was planned for September 10, 2005, but its premiere was delayed two weeks due to the busy 2005 hurricane season. Initial plans for the program, then hosted by Dao Vu and meteorologists Bill Keneely, Kelly Cass and Stephanie Abrams included an accompanying primetime talk show to debut in the second quarter of 2006, though those plans never came to fruition.

In the fall of 2006, meteorologist Stephanie Abrams left the program to co-host Abrams & Bettes: Beyond the Forecast with Mike Bettes and was not replaced. Later, in September 2007, meteorologist Samantha Mohr joined The Weather Channel to replace Kelly Cass, who moved to PM Edition. This move proved to be short-lived, as Cass returned to the program in May 2008. In April 2008, Vu (only the second non-meteorologist to ever host a live weather program on the channel; the other being Liz Jarvis-Fabian, who worked for the channel from 1986 to 1989) left and was not replaced.

On March 7, 2009, Weekend View expanded by two hours from 5-11 a.m. ET. At this point, Bill Keneely, the only host to remain with the show from the beginning of its run was moved to the weekend late night edition of PM Edition, while Betty Davis joined Kelly Cass on the 7-11 a.m. block. Jeff Morrow and Alex Wallace co-hosted the new 5-7 a.m. block. On July 31, 2010, Betty Davis left Weekend View, and departed from The Weather Channel as well; Maria LaRosa became her official replacement. In November 2010, Kelly Cass moved to Weather Center Live and Maria LaRosa joined Todd Santos for Weekend Now. Jen Carfagno and Eric Fisher became their replacements for the 7 a.m.-11 a.m. Eastern Time edition.

In July 2012, Alex Wallace moved to First Outlook, and was replaced by Danielle Banks. In October 2012, Jeff Morrow left TWC, and was replaced by Ray Stagich. In November 2012, Danielle Banks left for Weekend Now and Weather Center Live, and was not replaced.

If there was a major weather event, the 5-7 a.m. block of Weekend View would start two hours earlier and air from 3-7 a.m., and a meteorologist would join Ray Stagich during that time.

Eric Fisher left TWC on July 1, 2013, and was replaced by Reynolds Wolf.

On November 10, 2013, Weekend View aired its final broadcast after more than eight years. It was replaced by the new all-day Weather Center Live program on November 16, as part of the 2013 relaunch of the Weather Channel.

In 2015 a Weekend View like show, AMHQ Weekend, started airing 5-9 a.m. ET.
