= Weather Center =

Flagship news and weather television program of The Weather Channel

- Presented by: Various
- Opening theme: https://soundcloud.com/sam-richardson-26/weather-center-intense-bumper
- Country of origin: United States
- No. of episodes: 40,000+

Production
- Camera setup: Multi-camera
- Running time: Variable
- Production company: The Weather Channel

Original release
- Network: The Weather Channel
- Release: March 10, 1998 – March 1, 2009

Weather Center is a news and weather program produced by The Weather Channel in Atlanta, Georgia from 1998 until 2009. Initially, Weather Center was the lone program for The Weather Channel. By 2000, the show had started being significantly pared down as The Weather Channel shifted to a multi-program format, introducing programs such as Your Weather Today, and the gradual implementation of pre-recorded documentary series, such as Storm Stories.

== History ==
In 1995, The Weather Channel introduced WeatherScope, a show aired every 30 minutes, which featured the day's top weather stories, forecasts and severe weather coverage. The program was limited to mornings and evenings only before being broadcast 24/7. WeatherScope was carried through the 1996 channel redesign. Prior to 1996, WeatherScope This Morning was a morning version, differing only in presentation. In 1997, the weather wheel system was retooled with a new TWC programming schedule.

The title card used in the 1-5am ET broadcast, 1998-2001

WeatherScope was renamed Weather Center on March 10, 1998. The show continued to be the bulk of the channel's schedule, running every half-hour throughout the whole day (excluding the 30-minute overnight The Weather Classroom program for Cable in the Classroom). TWC's meteorologists would show weather forecasts and current conditions around the United States as well as international forecasts. From its debut in 1998 through early 2000, the program was divided into three blocks: Weather Center AM from 5 to 11 AM, Weather Center from 11 AM to 7 PM and 1 to 5 AM, and Weather Center PM from 7 PM to 1 AM. In early 2000, parts of the 'AM' block were replaced with First Outlook (5–7 AM) and Your Weather Today (7–9 AM), and in August 2001 much of the 'PM' block was replaced with Evening Edition. In April 2001, Weekend Now replaced the 7–11 AM portion of Weather Center AM; the latter's remaining 5–7 AM portion was replaced by Weekend Outlook in 2003. A revamp of the channel's presentation in June 2001 dropped the "AM/PM" distinction; this revamp also saw a slew of programs (both long-form and forecast-based) erode the Weather Center evening and weekend time slots; by 2008, only one hour remained.

Beginning in September 2003, the official hosts were Rich Johnson and Jeanetta Jones. On September 25, 2006, TWC announced major PM changes. Both hosts departed as a result of this. The new hosts became Vivian Brown and Jeff Morrow. Johnson left for Evening Edition and Jones left TWC altogether. In May 2008, Morrow moved to First Outlook and was replaced by Nick Walker. Brown and Walker were the last official anchors.

On Sunday, March 1, 2009, the original Weather Center was discontinued and a new program, Weather Center Live, debuted with an entirely different format.

== Notable on-air staff ==
=== Former ===
- Vivian Brown (2006–2009)
