= Vivian Brown =

Vivian Brown may refer to

- Vivian Brown (1927–2013), celebrity icon of San Francisco with her identical twin Marian, see Marian and Vivian Brown
- Vivian Brown (sprinter) (1941–1998), American sprinter
- Vivian Brown (meteorologist), American television meteorologist

== See also ==
- Vivian E. Browne (1929–1993), American artist
