= The Weather Classroom =

American educational TV series (1993–2007)

- Country of origin: United States
- No. of episodes: 23

Production
- Running time: 30 minutes

Original release
- Network: The Weather Channel
- Release: 1993 – 2007

The Weather Classroom was an educational television program for children that aired on The Weather Channel from 1993 to 2007. It was part of the Cable in the Classroom initiative, and aired at a in the early morning, when the show could be recorded for later showings in the classroom. Reruns aired until 2013.

== Program History ==
The Weather Classroom has taken on many forms on The Weather Channel (TWC) throughout the years. The program started in the early '90s on TWC and was hosted by various on-camera meteorologists who discussed various weather topics. In the early 2000s a new series of ten-minute episodes was created and hosted by non-meteorologists, with a companion textbook and website for teacher resources. In 2006, repeats of the Forecast Earth series began to air as part of The Weather Classroom.
