= Anaridis Rodriguez =

American journalist

Anaridis Rodriguez-Starnino
- Born: Anaridis M. Rodriguez; Dominican Republic
- Education: • B.A. in communications and Spanish at Rhode Island College • M.A. in journalism at Emerson College
- Occupation: Journalist
- Employer: CBS Boston - WBZ TV
- Spouse: Jesse Starnino (2012–present)

Anaridis Rodriguez-Starnino is an American journalist. From 2017 to 2022 she anchored and reported for the CBS owned-and-operated WBZ-TV in Boston. The journalist also worked for The Weather Channel. She is the former news anchor on America's Morning Headquarters.

== Career ==
During her time at Emerson College, Rodriguez contributed articles to The Boston Globe's hyper-local website "YourTown." Her college work garnered multiple Associated Press awards. Upon graduating in 2011, Rodriguez was hired as an anchor/reporter for WWLP-TV; an NBC affiliate in western Massachusetts. Aside from her daily beat as a weekday reporter and weekend anchor, she covered the aftermath of a historic tornado and the Boston Marathon bombings. In February 2014, she was hired by The Weather Channel as a news anchor for the network's flagship morning show, America's Morning Headquarters. On February 24, 2017, she announced she is leaving the Channel to spend more time with her family. Rodriguez joined CBS Boston as an anchor/reporter in April 2017. She exited the station in April 2022. In 2023 she joined the Providence, Rhode Island–based public relations firm The Perry Group where she serves as a Vice President. Concurrently with her PR duties, in January 2024 she became host of Generation Rising on Rhode Island PBS.

== Early life and education ==
Rodriguez was born in the Dominican Republic and immigrated to the United States at age 12 with her family.

She has a Master's degree in journalism from Emerson College and a Bachelor's degree in communications and Spanish at Rhode Island College.

== Personal life ==
Rodriguez married Jesse J. Starnino on October 6, 2012. They have one child, a son.

== See also ==
- America's Morning Headquarters
- List of personalities on The Weather Channel
