= Wake Up with Al =

American morning television series

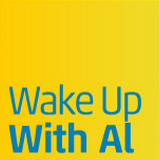
- Logo used from November 2013 to October 2015
- Presented by: Al Roker; Stephanie Abrams
- Country of origin: United States
- Original language: English

Production
- Production locations: Atlanta, Georgia; New York City, New York
- Camera setup: Multi-camera
- Running time: 120 minutes

Original release
- Network: The Weather Channel
- Release: July 20, 2009 – October 2, 2015

Related
- AMHQ; AMHQ Early

Wake Up with Al is an American breakfast television program on The Weather Channel. Airing Monday through Fridays live from 5 to 7 a.m. Eastern Time, the program featured a mix of weather forecasts, news headlines and feature segments. It debuted on July 20, 2009 and ended on October 2, 2015.

== Program history ==
The program was co-hosted by Al Roker, longtime weather anchor of the NBC morning program Today, and The Weather Channel meteorologist Stephanie Abrams. Roker hosted from Studio 6E, one of NBC's "newsnooks" at 30 Rockefeller Center in New York City; a large touchscreen was used during the broadcast at the studio to illustrate current and predicted weather conditions. MSNBC anchors provided news headlines during a segment produced out of MSNBC's headquarters at Rockefeller Center. In addition to weather forecasts, a celebrity interview was usually aired during the program, in a manner similar to those featured on Today; this has led to criticism from some viewers on the perception that Wake Up with Al focused more on entertainment than providing weather forecasts.

Original program logo, used from July 2009 to April 2012.

In the event of a pending or ongoing significant weather event occurring that day (such as a severe weather outbreak, winter storm or a hurricane threatening the United States), a special two-hour live edition of Wake Up with Al occasionally aired from 5-7 a.m. Eastern (effectively pushing back the start time of its lead-ins – previously First Outlook, First Forecast and Weather Center Live – by one hour). The 10 a.m. ET rebroadcast was originally replaced or preempted with a special live telecast; the rebroadcast was also pre-empted in such cases by an additional hour of America's Morning Headquarters. A special edition of Wake Up with Al also sometimes aired on weekend mornings from 5–7 a.m. Eastern during significant weather events.

On April 16, 2012, the show was "relaunched" with the introduction of a new opening title sequence and graphics package. In addition, Abrams would begin co-hosting the program from the New York City studio for a three-month trial run, which would become permanent should it be successful. In late July 2012, Abrams returned to The Weather Channel's Atlanta studio as Roker traveled to London to cover the 2012 Summer Olympics for Today and The Weather Channel (with Jim Cantore also covering the event for the channel); by this point, she and Mike Bettes resumed co-hosting the entire three-hour broadcast of Your Weather Today. After Roker returned to New York City following the Olympics, Abrams moved back to the New York City studio full-time starting in August 2012 (in effect, resulting in a permanent split city format for Your Weather Today (now America's Morning Headquarters), which Abrams had also co-anchored since 2009). By this point, Richard Lui anchored the weather news headlines segment from MSNBC out of the Wake Up with Al studio.

Second logo, used from April to November 2012.

On November 12, 2012, as part of a massive programming revamp at The Weather Channel, Wake Up with Al was expanded to 90 minutes, running from 5:30–7 a.m. ET. With the expansion, the program once again debuted a new graphics package after six months. On November 6, 2014, as part of another programming revamp, Wake Up with Al once again expanded its timeslot, this time to two hours, running from 5–7 a.m. ET due to a hike in ratings. On November 17, 2014, the 10–11 a.m. ET rebroadcast was cancelled. It was replaced by an expanded Weather Center Live, co-hosted by Chris Warren and Jen Carfagno.

On September 1, 2015, it was announced that Wake Up with Al would be cancelled. Its final episode aired on October 2, 2015. Network officials cited high production costs as a factor, owing to being the only program on The Weather Channel that was produced outside of Atlanta, as well as plans to focus back towards live weather coverage as its core programming. AMHQ would be extended to fill its former timeslot, while co-host Stephanie Abrams would move to Atlanta to continue her role on the program, displacing Sam Champion who now holds managing editor responsibilities at The Weather Channel, while Al Roker will continue to be involved with The Weather Channel as a contributor during breaking news events.

== Notable on-air staff ==
Wake Up with Al was anchored by Al Roker and Stephanie Abrams, with Reynolds Wolf as a segment correspondent and fill-in and news reports from MSNBC anchors Richard Lui, Dara Brown, Frances Rivera and Alex Witt.
