= Bob Stokes (meteorologist) =

American television meteorologist

Robert Elton Stokes, Jr. (born January 1958) is an American television meteorologist, and formerly for The Weather Channel from 1996 through 2008. He co-anchored the weekend morning show Weekend Outlook during his last several years at the network.

A native of Taipei, Taiwan, Stokes graduated from the University of Arkansas at Little Rock with a B.A. in radio, television and film and holds a Certificate of Broadcast Meteorology from Mississippi State University. He had also been a member of the American Meteorological Society and held their seal of approval.

Prior to joining The Weather Channel in June 1996, he had worked at KFSM-TV, KARK-TV, WROC-TV, WTVF and WREG-TV.

He has been successfully sued in arbitration by former co-anchor Hillary Andrews for sexual harassment, in which Andrews alleged that he said sexual things to Andrews like "will you lick my swizzle stick". He was fired from the Weather Channel over this incident.
