= Kait Parker =

Atmospheric scientist

Kait Parker is an atmospheric scientist who recently worked for weather.com and The Weather Channel app. She can also occasionally be seen on Good Morning America where she fills-in for meteorologist Rob Marciano on weekends. Prior to her role with weather.com, she was an on-camera meteorologist and host of America's Morning Headquarters Weekend Edition alongside Reynolds Wolf. She left The Weather Channel television network in early 2016. As of Labor Day weekend in 2019, she has been noticed contributing to weather.com, particularly in presenting and analyzing information about Hurricane Dorian.

Parker made national headlines in 2016 with a rebuttal to Breitbart, a far-right website that used a video of her in an article claiming that the Earth was cooling rather than warming. The Webby Awards chose Parker's video as an honoree in the category of viral in 2017.

In 2016, Parker released a mini-documentary called Toxic Lake: The Untold Story of Lake Okeechobee about cyanobacteria (blue-green algae) and water management in Florida where she was both producer and correspondent. The project has gone on to win The Society of Professional Journalists' top honor for Digital Video and nominated for the News and Documentary Emmy Awards for Outstanding Science and Environmental Reporting.

She was also named to the Grist 50 list of Climate Fixers in 2017 and was featured in Marie Claire Magazine's first issue on sustainability.

Parker received a Bachelor of Science in Atmospheric Science from The University of Missouri in May 2009. Parker has also earned her Certified Broadcast Meteorologist Seal of Approval from the American Meteorological Society.

Parker began her career by filling in at KOMU-TV in Columbia, Mo., in 2006 while still enrolled at the University of Missouri. Upon graduation in May 2009, she became weekday morning and midday meteorologist for WAKA-TV in Montgomery, AL. From there she went on to WPTV-TV in West Palm Beach, FL where she was first hired as weekend meteorologist but was quickly put into a weekday role. Parker left WPTV-TV in early 2014 and went to work for The Weather Channel.

Parker was born and raised in Grapevine, Texas, and often points to her mother and father as the source of her interest in science. She is currently married and announced her first pregnancy in April 2020.
