= Paul Goodloe =

American meteorologist

- Born: Paul Roland Goodloe; August 22, 1968; New Rochelle, New York
- Education: University of Texas at Austin; University of California at Berkeley
- Occupation: Television Meteorologist
- Employer: The Weather Channel
- Spouse: Married
- Children: 2

Paul Goodloe is an American television meteorologist, currently working for The Weather Channel (TWC). Goodloe has been with TWC since 1999.

He currently co-anchors Weekend Recharge with Dr. Greg Postel and is a field reporter.

== Early career and education ==
Before coming to TWC Goodloe worked at KSDK-TV, KRIV, and KSBY-TV as a broadcast meteorologist. He received an undergraduate degree in geography at The University of Texas at Austin and a master's degree in climatology from the University of California, Berkeley.

== Accreditations ==
Goodloe is a member of The American Meteorological Society (AMS), The National Weather Association (NWA), and The National Association of Black Journalists

== See also ==
- List of personalities on The Weather Channel
