= Atmospheres (TV series) =

- Starring: Jim Cantore and Mish Michaels
- Country of origin: United States
- No. of episodes: N/A

Production
- Running time: 60 minutes

Original release
- Network: The Weather Channel
- Release: August 23, 2000 – 2002

Atmospheres was a weekly television series on The Weather Channel. The series, hosted by meteorologists Jim Cantore and Mish Michaels, featured current weather news and information. Some of the original segments included "Feature of the Week", dramatic rescue stories from inclement weather (which would set the tone for Storm Stories); "Destinations", which highlighted exotic locales; "In The Elements", profiles of people working in extreme weather (a forerunner to Epic Conditions), and a unique weather story that varied with each episode. Each episode contained three local and two national forecasts.

Originally, Atmospheres aired new episodes on Sundays at 8 p.m. and 11 p.m. Eastern, Wednesdays at 8 p.m., and Saturdays at 5 p.m. Encore episodes aired on Saturdays at 8 p.m. and 11 p.m. and Sundays at 5 p.m. In January 2003, when the award-winning drama Storm Stories premiered, new episodes of Atmospheres no longer aired. Reruns still aired on weekends until the end of summer 2003 when Storm Stories started airing every night. Since then, Atmospheres has not been on The Weather Channel's programming schedule; however, Atmospheres was the first entry of an initiative proposed in 2000 (by Jim Alexander, former head of viewer research) for creating a defining signature long-form program like Storm Stories, It Could Happen Tomorrow and When Weather Changed History. Cantore's new show, Storm Stories premiered the same night Atmospheres had ended.
