= Carfagna =

Carfagna is an Italian surname. Notable people with the surname include:

- Carlo Carfagna (born 1940), Italian classical guitarist
- Mara Carfagna (born 1975), Italian politician and former showgirl and model
- Rick Carfagna (fl. from 2002), American politician
