= Forecast Earth =

Forecast Earth is the name for The Weather Channel's environmental initiatives. It also was the name of an environment news program that ran on TWC from 2006 to 2008.

== History of the brand ==
The Forecast Earth brand was introduced in 2003 for special series. In 2004, The Weather Channel announced that it would be creating six more special programs under the Forecast Earth name at its April upfront presentation to advertisers. In conjunction with the 2008 launch of the channel's new studios, several environmentally friendly features were connected to the Forecast Earth brand on an online studio tour. In December 2007, The Weather Channel held a Forecast Earth Summit for 22 high school students. A second summit was planned for 2008, but was canceled after the entire Forecast Earth program was disbanded. However, the finalists were still given an opportunity to showcase their green ideas on a web page.

=== Forecast Earth and the workplace ===
The Weather Channel kept the environment in mind when constructing its HD studios, which made their on-air debut on 2 June 2008. TWC aimed for LEED gold certification in constructing the building, and various technologies were integrated to both the new and existing structures to improve energy efficiency. In August 2007, TWC announced a branch of the Forecast Earth initiative titled "Forecast Earth: Going Green at Work" to promote environmentally friendly workplaces and its own internal initiatives, including telecommuting, carpooling, and using sustainable materials.

=== Classroom Earth ===
TWC also launched a related "Classroom Earth" program providing grants to teachers who incorporated environmental issues into their lesson plans.

== The television program ==
Forecast Earth
- Presented by: Natalie Allen
- Country of origin: United States

Production
- Production location: Atlanta, Georgia
- Running time: Variable

Original release
- Network: The Weather Channel
- Release: July 23, 2006 – March 1, 2009

Related
- The Climate Code with Dr. Heidi Cullen = Weather Center (2009)

The Forecast Earth television program began in 2006 as the 30-minute The Climate Code with Dr. Heidi Cullen. On April 29, 2007, the names of The Climate Code and of One Degree, an accompanying broadband initiative, were changed to Forecast Earth; at the same time, the TV program became an hour-long show. Natalie Allen became the program's primary presenter at the beginning of 2008, moving from CNN.

As part of cost-cutting measures, it was announced on 20 November 2008 (ironically, in the midst of new parent company NBC Universal's "Green is Universal" Week) that the entire Forecast Earth team except for Allen would be laid off and Forecast Earth canceled. At the time, the channel announced that it would air other environmental programs. Eco Update segments with environmental news still aired on the channel presented by Allen and bearing the Forecast Earth name.
