= Vivian Brown (meteorologist) =

American television meteorologist

- Born: Greenville, Mississippi
- Education: Jackson State University, (B.S., Meteorology, 1986)
- Occupation: Television Meteorologist
- Known for: The Weather Channel
- Children: 3

Vivian Louise Brown is an American television meteorologist who worked for The Weather Channel. She most recently co-hosted Weather Center Live from noon to 3pm on weekdays. Brown was with The Weather Channel from 1986 to 2015. Brown formerly co-hosted Day Planner until it was cancelled in 2013 and replaced by the all-day form of Weather Center Live.

== Early life and education ==
Brown was born in Greenville, Mississippi but then later moved to Jackson, Mississippi in her teen years. Brown graduated with a degree in meteorology from Jackson State University in 1986. Brown was the only attendant of Jackson State's new meteorology program at the time. Brown attended Jackson State under an athletic scholarship for track and field, competing as a sprinter.

== Career ==
Brown started at The Weather Channel in 1986 following a summer internship program, first working in forecasting off-camera, then appearing on the air in 1988. In her 29-year career with The Weather Channel, Brown hosted Afternoon Outlook from 2003 to 2006, PM Edition Weekend from 2006 to 2010, Day Planner from 2010 to 2013, and Weather Center Live from 2013 to 2015. Brown made the announcement she was leaving the Weather Channel during her final broadcast on 1 September 2015.

== Personal life ==
Brown has three children.

== See also ==
- List of personalities on The Weather Channel
