= Weekend Outlook =

- Country of origin: United States

Production
- Camera setup: Multi-camera

Original release
- Network: The Weather Channel
- Release: 2003 – March 1, 2009

Weekend Outlook was a weekend morning weather program on The Weather Channel. It was comparable to First Outlook, but with a different focus: Weekend Outlook was geared toward weekend planning and forecasts, compared to the commuter/straightforward style of First Outlook. It also started one hour later than First Outlook; the first hour is occupied by Weather in the Classroom and then Sunrise Weather, a weekend-exclusive early morning weather program. Weekend Outlook was one of the lowest-rated programs on The Weather Channel. From 2003 to 2007, It was hosted by only Ray Stagich, then from 2007 to 2008, it was hosted by Stagich and Bob Stokes. After Stokes was fired from TWC, he was replaced by Cheryl Lemke. She, however, was also fired during 2008 and was replaced by Mark Mancuso. This lasted until the show was cancelled. Mancuso later was fired during 2009 and Stagich went on to Sunrise Weather.

The Weekend Outlook name has also been used by The Weather Channel for weekend forecast inserts until 2003.

Weekend Outlook made its debut as part of the large 2003 graphical relaunch of The Weather Channel (see History of The Weather Channel).

Upon the 2008 HD relaunch of The Weather Channel, Weekend Outlook temporarily used portions of the Weekend Planner package (specifically segment openers).

On Sunday, March 1, 2009, Weekend Outlook aired their final broadcast in favor of an extra two-hour block of Weekend View.
