= Crystal Egger =

American meteorologist

- Education: University of California, Santa Barbara (B.A. 2000)
- Occupation: Meteorologist
- Years active: 2004–2017
- Employer: KNBC
- Spouse: Married
- Children: 2

Crystal Egger is an American former meteorologist with The Weather Channel and KNBC.

== Early life and education ==
Egger, a native of Grand Terrace, California, attended Terrace Hills Middle School and Colton High School.

Upon graduation, she attended the University of California, Santa Barbara where she received a B.A. in communications in 2000. After UCSB, she attended Mississippi State University's meteorology program.

== Career ==
=== Local beginnings ===
Egger started her on-air work in San Diego, California, appearing on ITV Cable 16 in August 2004. She moved to become the lead weather anchor on KIFI-TV in Idaho Falls, Idaho in 2006. She subsequently moved to Denver, Colorado, where she served as KDVR's from 2007 through 2010. While in Denver, she covered the 2008 Windsor, Colorado tornado.

=== The Weather Channel ===
It was announced on September 1, 2010, that Egger had joined Atlanta-based The Weather Channel. She remained with the organization for three years. She did segments for The Weather Channel while at KNBC.

=== Return home ===
Egger returned to Southern California in September 2013 when she joined KNBC in Los Angeles, California. She left the role in 2017.

== Personal life ==
Egger has two daughters.
