= Mike Bettes =

American TV Meteorologist (born 1972)

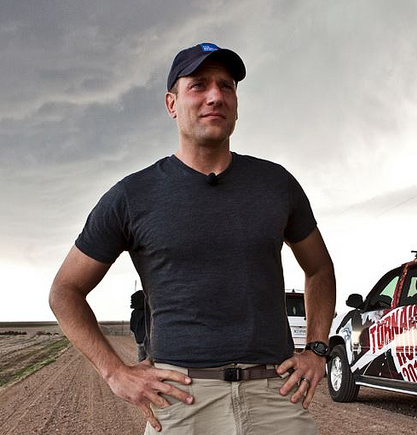
- Bettes in 2013
- Born: January 9, 1972 (age 54); Tallmadge, Ohio, U.S.
- Education: Ohio State University
- Occupation: Meteorologist
- Years active: 1988–present
- Employer: The Weather Channel

Michael Bettes (born January 9, 1972) is an American television meteorologist and storm chaser who works for The Weather Channel in Atlanta, Georgia. He was a co-host of AMHQ: America's Morning Headquarters. He hosts Weather Underground TV. Bettes has been an on-camera meteorologist for TWC since 2003, and is also an occasional fill-in weather anchor on The Today Show.

Bettes hosted Abrams & Bettes Beyond the Forecast from 2006 to 2009, and Your Weather Today from 2009 to 2012. When it was relaunched as Morning Rush, he hosted it into 2014. The program was relaunched again in March of that year as America's Morning Headquarters. Bettes also formerly hosted Wake Up With Al, from 2009–2014. Bettes is a field reporter for The Weather Channel and is lead field meteorologist for The Great Tornado Hunt, the annual show that summarizes the nation's tornado seasons.

Bettes accompanied scientists for TWC coverage of VORTEX2. He also has reported live from Hurricane Milton, Hurricane Helene, Hurricane Katrina, Hurricane Sandy, and other tropical cyclones, as well as the 2011 Joplin tornado, floods and winter storms.

He survived the 2013 El Reno tornado in Oklahoma. A year later he and his crew returned to the Great Plains to forecast and report severe weather as part of the 2014 Tornado Track.

== Early life and education, early career ==
Born in Tallmadge, Ohio on January 9, 1972, Bettes attended local schools when growing up. He graduated with a B.S. in atmospheric sciences from Ohio State University (OSU).

He worked as chief meteorologist for WLOS in Asheville, North Carolina, and as weekend meteorologist at WSYX/WTTE in Columbus, Ohio and WKEF/WRGT in Dayton, Ohio. Following that, he started work for The Weather Channel.

== Tornado incident ==
Bettes was one of several storm chasers struck by an EF3 tornado in El Reno, Oklahoma in 2013. The storm rolled and tossed his SUV approximately 200 yards (180 m) into a field. The roof collapsed and his crew suffered major injuries: driver Austin Anderson broke several bones. They were later found by Reed Timmer and his SRV Dominator team, who were storm chasing for Oklahoma City's KFOR-TV when they spotted Bettes' wrecked SUV, and saw The Weather Channel's markings on it, meeting up with Emily Sutton and her team from KFOR, who also suffered damage to their vehicles from the tornado as well. They stopped to assist Bettes and his wounded team alongside Oklahoma Highway Patrol and other first responders, but had to leave to escape the back end of the storm. Bettes and his team were safely evacuated and received medical attention. By the following year, Bettes had made a full recovery in time for the next year's Great Tornado Hunt chase season.

The same tornado killed TWISTEX storm chasers Tim Samaras, his son Paul, and colleague Carl Young. Local resident Richard Charles Henderson was also killed in the same area as the TWISTEX crew after deciding to chase the storm.

== Career timeline ==
- 1988—1998: WSYX/WTTE weekend meteorologist
- 1998–2003: WLOS chief meteorologist
- 2003–present: The Weather Channel
  - 2003–present: Field reporter
  - 2006–2009: Abrams & Bettes: Beyond the Forecast co-host
  - 2009: Weather Center Live co-host
  - 2009–2014: Wake Up With Al segment correspondent and fill-anchor
  - 2009–2012: Your Weather Today co-host
  - 2012–2014: Morning Rush co-host
  - March 2014–January 23, 2015: America's Morning Headquarters co-host
  - August 2015–2024: Weather Underground TV
  - 2024-present: Weather Unfiltered
- 2007–present: NBC News
  - 2007–present: The Today Show fill-in weather anchor
  - 2007–present: Special reporter

== See also ==
- List of personalities on The Weather Channel
