= Dave Schwartz =

American meteorologist

- Born: February 20, 1953; Philadelphia, Pennsylvania
- Died: July 30, 2016 (aged 63); Atlanta, Georgia

David Schwartz (February 20, 1953 – July 30, 2016) was a meteorologist at The Weather Channel from 1991 to 2008 and again from 2014 to 2016. Often referring to viewers as "my friends" before giving forecasts, Schwartz presented an easygoing manner and a gentle sense of humor that made him popular with the viewers.

== Biography ==
=== Early life ===
Schwartz was born on February 20, 1953, in Philadelphia, Pennsylvania, where he grew up and earned a degree in psychology from Temple University. He received a certificate in meteorology studies from Mississippi State University.

=== The Weather Channel ===
Schwartz joined the Weather Channel in 1982, initially as a newsroom assistant while working for the Fulton County Health Department in Georgia. He became an on-camera meteorologist in 1991. Shortly after NBC/Comcast bought The Weather Channel in 2008, Schwartz was one of a handful of longtime on-camera meteorologists who were laid off in a shakeup that sought to send the network in a new direction. After years of viewer feedback—including a website called "Bring Back Dave Schwartz"—the network rehired him in the spring of 2014.

=== Death ===
Schwartz died on July 30, 2016, after a ten-year battle with pancreatic and stomach cancer, the former of which he beat twice. He was 63. The Washington Post published a tribute article with essays from many of Schwartz's coworkers.
