= America's Morning Headquarters =

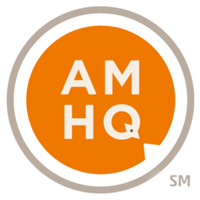
- Also known as: Your Weather Today (2000–2012); Morning Rush (2012–2014)
- Presented by: Weekdays (morning): Jim Cantore; Stephanie Abrams; Jordan Steele; Weekdays (midday): Alex Wallace; Jen Carfagno; Weekends: Reynolds Wolf; Kelly Cass
- Country of origin: United States
- Original language: English

Production
- Production locations: Atlanta, Georgia
- Camera setup: Multi-camera
- Running time: 180 minutes

Original release
- Network: The Weather Channel
- Release: January 10, 2000 – present

America's Morning Headquarters (formerly Your Weather Today, Morning Rush and AMHQ) is a television program on The Weather Channel. Airing every morning from 6 a.m. to 2 p.m. Eastern Time, the program focuses on morning weather conditions, news and business information from around the country. The program debuted on January 10, 2000, under its original title. If there is a major weather event, it used to air until 10 am, however since 2017, it's usually cut back an hour for additional live broadcasts for Weather Center Live.

== Program history ==
=== As Your Weather Today ===
In 2000, The Weather Channel began a multi-year reformatting of its program schedule, converting from a one-program approach (embodied in Weather Center) to a multi-program schedule for its forecast programs. The first changes occurred with its morning schedule, formerly composed solely of Weather Center AM. Two programs were carved out of Weather Center AM initially, First Outlook and Your Weather Today, which debuted on January 10, 2000 (a third "morning" program, Day Planner, premiered in 2003). At its launch, Your Weather Today was anchored by Heather Tesch (who had made her TWC debut the year prior) and Marshall Seese. For Your Weather Today, the Local on the 8s concept – in which local forecasts are shown six times an hour – was revived. One of the segments featured on the program was "Travel Desk", focusing on air travel and highway travel conditions.

In 2008, Your Weather Today underwent a graphical relaunch as part of TWC's conversion to high-definition broadcasts; between June 2 and August 12, all the Weather Channel's live weather programming began broadcasting in high definition from a new HD studio facility. Marshall Seese retired in November of that year, and was replaced by Nicole Mitchell. In March 2009, Tesch left Your Weather Today to become co-anchor of Day Planner and was replaced by Kevin Robinson. Also at this point, storm tracker Jim Cantore joined the show from Evening Edition, which was canceled around that time.

Program logo used from April 5, 2010, to April 13, 2012.

On June 22, 2009, Stephanie Abrams and Mike Bettes, both of whom previously hosted Beyond the Forecast, took over as co-anchors of Your Weather Today after the former program's cancellation. As Abrams serves as a fill-in for Al Roker on NBC's Today, which broadcasts from New York City, Jen Carfagno and Eric Fisher both frequently serve as substitutes for Abrams.

Your Weather Today implemented a new graphics and music package on April 5, 2010. This revamp removed the "with Abrams & Bettes" subtitling on-air; however, interactive programming guides and program listings on weather.com continued to refer to the program as Your Weather Today with Abrams & Bettes. In 2010, Carfagno's appearances on the show increased significantly, because Bettes' was often absent doing field reports as part of the Vortex 2 experiment from May 1 to June 15, and Abrams was working on the second season of The Weather Channel's original long-form program WeatherProof. The move coincided with the cancellation of the controversial Flick and a Forecast movie series, which Carfagno had hosted. Chris Warren began serving as a fill-in when a second substitute was needed.

From May 9 to June 3, 2011, Mike Bettes returned to field reporting on the Vortex 2 project for a third consecutive year (the channel's reports on the project had by that point become known as "The Great Tornado Hunt"). For 2012, Abrams remained in-studio on Your Weather Today during "The Great Tornado Hunt", which was truncated slightly because the channel's crew worked independently from the since-ended Vortex 2 project.

Your Weather Today logo used from April 16 to November 9, 2012.

On April 16, 2012, the program was revamped with new on-air graphics. In addition, Stephanie Abrams began co-hosting the show from New York City from 7–9 a.m. ET only. For the 9 a.m. hour, Mike Bettes was joined by either Eric Fisher, Jen Carfagno or Maria LaRosa from Atlanta. The network gave this format a three-month trial run, likely planning to move Abrams permanently to New York if it had been successful. On July 30, 2012, Abrams returned to the Atlanta studio, and she and Mike Bettes resumed hosting the show for all three hours. However, two weeks later on August 13, Stephanie Abrams moved to the New York City studio full-time. She and Mike Bettes continued to host the show from 7 to 9 a.m. while Maria LaRosa joined Bettes for the 9 a.m. hour.

=== Relaunch as Morning Rush ===
On November 12, 2012, Your Weather Today was relaunched, with the same hosts, under the new title Morning Rush. In late 2013, Jennifer Delgado joined the program. Abrams remained co-anchor of Morning Rush, with her duties expanding to 7 a.m. to 9 a.m. (from 7 a.m. to 8 a.m.), and Delgado co-anchoring the 9 a.m. Eastern hour. TWC got a new graphics and music package called "Weather All The Time" in November 2013, Morning Rush and every other live programming show got an upgrade.

=== Relaunch as AMHQ ===
The program was relaunched on March 17, 2014, as America's Morning Headquarters (AMHQ), with Mike Bettes, Maria LaRosa and Sam Champion as co-anchors, Anaridis Rodriguez as news anchor, & Reese Waters on sports anchoring the program in the Atlanta studios, with Stephanie Abrams reporting live from New York City. The debut episode of AMHQ averaged 207,000 viewers during its three-hour time slot.

On January 26, 2015, meteorologists Jim Cantore and Jennifer Delgado joined Sam Champion as co-hosts of the program. Mike Bettes and Maria LaRosa departed AMHQ on January 23. Bettes was named host of Weather Underground later that year while LaRosa was shifted to weekends. A weekend edition of AMHQ was also announced, with meteorologists Reynolds Wolf and Kait Parker hosting from 5:00 to 9:00 AM ET. The weekend edition launched on February 7, 2015. Chris Warren, Stephanie Abrams, Jen Carfagno & Ari Sarsalari are common fill-ins on AMHQ.

On October 30, 2015, Sam Champion hosted his final AMHQ show. He moved back to New York City in January 2016 to host a primetime show from there. Jennifer Delgado departed a week later to Weather Center Live.

On November 8, 2015, AMHQ relaunched again in a new timeslot, 5 am-9 am ET. The first hour is branded AMHQ Early hosted by Jen Carfagno & Anaridis Rodriguez with Stephanie Abrams & Jim Cantore joining them beginning at the second hour.

On January 10, 2016, Kait Parker co-hosted her final AMHQ Weekend show and left TWC. She was replaced by Kelly Cass.

On February 24, 2017, Anaridis Rodriguez announced she was leaving AMHQ. She was not replaced after her departure. Jen Carfagno has anchored AMHQ Early solo since February 27, 2017.

On June 9, 2018, AMHQ Weekend was reduced to three hours, starting at 6 am and ending at 9 am ET.

In March 2020, AMHQ Early was temporarily canceled due to the outbreak of COVID-19. However, AMHQ early returned on June 22, 2020 with Jordan Steele joining as a co-anchor. Also, AMHQ was expanded back to four hours from 6-10 am eastern.

On June 14, 2021, The Weather Channel dropped the AMHQ acronym, replacing it with the acronym's initialism of America's Morning Headquarters. The new show debuted alongside a new logo and expanded programming until 12 PM Eastern, adding Alex Wallace as a host from Weather Center Live's 10 AM to 12 PM time slot, which it replaces.

On May 13, 2024, AMHQ was extended to 1 PM ET, replacing Pattrn, which now airs on weekends from 1 to 2 PM Eastern Time. Later in the year on October 28, AMHQ was extended another hour, ending at 2 PM ET.

== Notable on-air staff ==
=== Current ===
- Stephanie Abrams – co-anchor weekdays 6-10 am – also Your Weather Today/Morning Rush anchor (2009–2014)
- Jim Cantore – co-anchor weekdays 6-10 am
- Jen Carfagno – co-anchor weekdays 10 am-2 pm
- Kelly Cass – co-anchor co-anchor weekends 6 am-9 am
- Greg Postel, Ph.D. - storm specialist weekdays 10 am-2 pm
- Jordan Steele – co-anchor weekdays 6-10 am
- Alex Wallace – co-anchor weekdays 10 am-2 pm
- Reynolds Wolf – co-anchor weekends 7-9 am

=== Former ===
- Nicole Mitchell – Your Weather Today anchor (2004–2009). Later at KSTP-TV in Minneapolis from 2017-2021. Now in politics with the state of Minnesota.
- Sam Champion (2014–2015) - now at WABC-TV in New York City and weather correspondent for ABC News.
- Mike Bettes (2014–2015) – also Your Weather Today/Morning Rush anchor (2009–2014), now co-hosts Weather Unfiltered.
- Maria LaRosa (2014–2015) - now at WNBC-TV in New York City.
- Anaridis Rodriguez (2014–2017) - left for WBZ-TV in Boston, MA, but she left that station in April 2022.
- Jennifer Delgado (2015) - now at WTTG-TV in Washington, D.C.
