= Jen Carfagno =

American television meteorologist

- Born: Jennifer Carfagno; July 19, 1976 (age 50); Collegeville, Pennsylvania, U.S.
- Other names: Jen Carfagno, Jennifer Carfagno-McGillis
- Occupation: Meteorologist
- Years active: 1998-present
- Known for: The Weather Channel
- Notable work: AMHQ
- Spouse(s): Neil McGillis, ?-present
- Children: 2, daughters Natalie and Kelly, with McGillis

Jennifer Carfagno (born July 19, 1976) is an American television meteorologist, currently working for The Weather Channel (TWC), co-hosting AMHQ from 9 am to 12 pm weekdays with Alex Wallace.

== Life and career ==
Born and raised in Collegeville, Pennsylvania, Carfagno attended Pennsylvania State University, where she earned a Bachelor's Degree in Meteorology in 1998.

Carfagno interned with The Weather Channel while still attending Penn State and joined the network as a full-time forecaster shortly after she graduated in 1999. She participated in The Weather Channel on-camera meteorologist apprentice program, earning time in front of the camera every weekend.

From 2013 to 2016, Carfagno and Alex Wallace anchored Weather Center Live on Thursday-Friday early mornings and weekend mornings.

In a 2015 interview with Slate, Carfagno admitted that deciding what to wear was often the most stressful part of her job. She also said that since meteorologists have to move around and can’t plug their microphones into a desk like news anchors often do, she wears her microphone communicator device on a strap around her thigh—like “a Bond girl.” Regarding her outfits, Carfagno claimed that viewers disapproved of her outfits when they thought they were too tight. Her favorite weather measurement is dew points as she is often referred to as the "Dewpoint Diva." In 2017, in preparation for The Weather Channel's coverage for the Total Solar Eclipse, she gave up tips of how to watch it and information in an interview with People Magazine. In 2019, she was named Meteorologist Hall of Fame honoree at the Weather Discovery Center in Punxsutawney, Pennsylvania

As of April 20, 2018, Carfagno's Twitter page shows that she has 967,100 followers. The page also shows an activity level of around 33,900 Tweets.
