= Afternoon Outlook =

2003 American TV weather program

- Presented by: Vivian Brown; Jeff Morrow
- Country of origin: United States

Production
- Production location: Atlanta
- Camera setup: Multi-camera

Original release
- Network: The Weather Channel
- Release: 2003 – 2006

Afternoon Outlook was a weather program on The Weather Channel from 2003 to 2006. The show could be seen on weekdays between 4 and 6 p.m. ET.

== Program history ==
In 2003, The Weather Channel launched two afternoon/evening programs: Afternoon Outlook and PM Edition. Its pairing of meteorologists for the entire duration of the show was Nick Walker and Vivian Brown.

On September 25, 2006, The Weather Channel shifted around the afternoon and evening programs: Afternoon Outlook was canceled to make way for an earlier PM Edition, itself moved up to make way for Abrams & Bettes: Beyond the Forecast.
