= Stephanie Abrams =

American television meteorologist

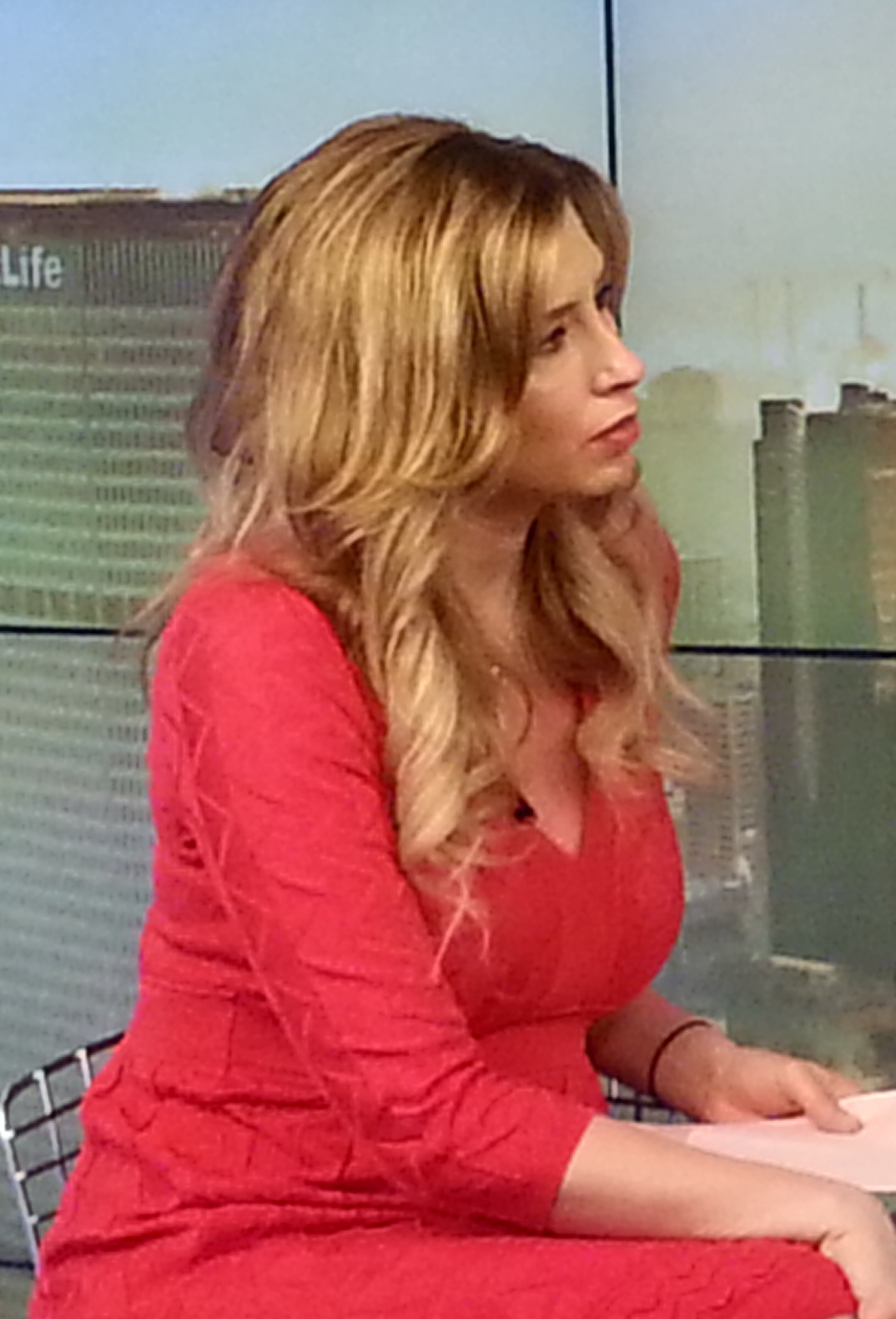
- Abrams in May 2014
- Born: October 27, 1978 (age 47); Wellington, Florida, U.S.
- Education: University of Florida; Florida State University
- Occupation: Meteorologist
- Years active: 2000–present
- Employers: The Weather Channel; NBC News

Stephanie Abrams (born October 27, 1978) is an American television meteorologist who has worked for The Weather Channel (TWC) since 2003. She currently co-hosts America's Morning Headquarters with Jim Cantore and Jordan Steele early weekday mornings, as well as Pattern alongside Steele. She was also employed by NBC News and occasionally appeared on NBC Nightly News, Today and MSNBC.

== Education ==
A graduate of Space Camp, Abrams attended the University of Florida in Gainesville, where she earned a Bachelor of Science (B.S.) in geography, with a minor in mathematics. She graduated with honors and was elected to Phi Beta Kappa. She was a member of Delta Phi Epsilon sorority, where she served as president of the chapter.

Abrams's second degree was a B.S. in meteorology from Florida State University (FSU) in Tallahassee, where she graduated cum laude. At Florida State, Abrams, like other meteorology students, practiced on-air forecasts on FSU Live, a student-run news and weather production on a Tallahassee cable channel. She worked as a teaching assistant at FSU, teaching a class about meteorology. She said about FSU: "I think the professors made a difference in that they were so engaged with the kids and also there were small classes there, so it was really nice that the class hung out together, and it was nice to have that kind of environment."

== Career ==
Abrams's first position was as a morning meteorologist at WTXL, the ABC affiliate in Tallahassee, Florida. In July 2003, Abrams began on-air work for The Weather Channel as a reporter and fill-in, roles she filled until 2005, when she joined her first show, Weekend View, as a co-host. In 2006, she became an on-camera meteorologist as co-host of Abrams and Bettes: Beyond the Forecast and then went on to Weather Center, also with co-host Mike Bettes.

Beginning on July 20, 2009, she co-anchored Wake Up With Al with Al Roker on weekday mornings from NBC studios in New York. Abrams also occasionally filled in for Roker on Today, and occasionally joined Sam Champion on America's Morning Headquarters (AMHQ). During the 2010 Winter Olympics, she and Roker reported live from Vancouver from February 8 to 28 for Wake Up With Al and AMHQ. Wake Up With Al was cancelled in 2015, and Abrams returned to work from the Weather Channel's studios in Atlanta.

Abrams was interim weather anchor on Weekend Today in 2012 when Bill Karins and Janice Huff left, until Dylan Dreyer arrived. She co-hosted The Weather Channel programs On The Radar from 2012 to 2013 and Morning Rush (formerly Your Weather Today) on weekdays from 2009 to 2014.

Abrams is now a co-host of America’s Morning Headquarters with Jim Cantore and Jordan Steele, as well as the co-host of Pattrn with Steele.

== Memberships ==
Abrams is a member of the National Weather Association (NWA) and the American Meteorological Society (AMS) and was president of the North Florida chapter of the AMS from 2002 to 2003. She holds the seal of approval from the AMS.

== In popular culture ==
In 2014 Abrams had a cameo appearance as herself in the film Sharknado 2: The Second One.
