= PM Edition Weekend =

- Also known as: PM Edition, PM, PME
- Genre: Weather
- Directed by: David Fincher
- Presented by: Gavin Esler, Anita Anand, Sarah Smith, Cathy Newman, Mark Mardell, Riz Lateef, Ben Wright, Alex Forsyth, Nick Robinson, Chris Mason
- Country of origin: United States
- Original language: English

Production
- Production location: Atlanta
- Cinematography: Robert Elswit
- Camera setup: Multi-camera
- Running time: Originally, 6 pm to 8 pm Eastern Time, changed, 4 pm to 7 pm Eastern Time

Original release
- Network: The Weather Channel
- Release: September 29, 2003 – March 25, 2012

Related
- Weather Center Live

PM Edition was a weather program on The Weather Channel, an American television station. It focused on weather conditions for the evening commute. It also recapped the day's weather and delivered the forecast for tomorrow.

== Program history ==
PM Edition and sister program Afternoon Outlook were launched in fall 2003 and helped finish the compartmentalization of the TWC programming day, which transformed the network from just Weather Center to a myriad of different shows with set hosts and tone. The original pair of meteorologists for the program was Carl Parker and Kristina Abernathy.

The program, originally two hours in length airing from 6pm to 8pm Eastern Time was expanded to three hours, airing from 4pm to 7pm eastern on September 25, 2006 as a result of the cancellation of Afternoon Outlook and the debut of Abrams And Bettes: Beyond The Forecast. In September 2007, the program once again returned to two hours in length airing from 5pm to 7pm eastern. In March 2009, the show returned to three hours in length replacing the afternoon hour of Weather Center, which was revamped as a primetime program. The format of the program was slightly different on the weekends as the program aired late at night during the weekends, which from 11pm to 2am eastern. The weekend format primarily focuses on the day's significant weather events similar to Evening Edition and the weeknight version of Weather Center. In the event an ongoing significant weather event occurred (e.g., severe weather outbreak, winter storm, hurricane threatening the United States), the weekday edition of PM Edition began one hour earlier, preempting long-form programming during the 3pm-4pm eastern timeslot.

A major shift in The Weather Channel's programming schedule began on September 27, 2010. With this change, PM Edition became a weekend only show, airing four hour-long blocks at 4pm, 7pm, 10pm and 1am Eastern Time. Carl Parker and Heather Tesch, the hosts of Weekend Now, became the hosts of the 4pm eastern hour, while Kim Cunningham and Adam Berg stayed as hosts of the remaining hour-long blocks. Soon after, PM Edition only aired a one-hour block at 4pm eastern and was replaced with Weather Center for the remaining hour blocks. Due to this, Maria LaRosa and Todd Santos began hosting the 4pm eastern hour of PM Edition.

On March 31, 2012, PM Edition came to an end. A week prior, schedule changes were announced that involved moving the weekend afternoon schedule to all days, with Weather Center Live airing at 4pm Eastern Time. The addition of Weather Center Live airing at 4pm Eastern Time was implemented into the weekend schedule, thus ending PM Edition's runtime.

== Former hosts ==
Weekday Version - September 29, 2003 to September 24, 2010

- Kristina Abernathy (left in November 2004 for Day Planner and Weekend Now; now no longer at TWC)
- Vivian Brown (last official anchor; left in September 2010 for Day Planner; now no longer at TWC)
- Kelly Cass (left in May 2008 for Day Planner and Weekend View; now on AMHQ Weekend)
- Betty Davis (left in March 2009 for Day Planner and Weekend View; now with WPLG in Miami/Fort Lauderdale)
- Jennifer Lopez (left in September 2007 for Day Planner and Weekend Now; left for KXAS-TV, then returned to TWC April 20, 2013; now a fill in)
- Samantha Mohr (left in March 2009 to anchor the weekend version; now with WXIA-TV)
- Carl Parker (left in December 2007, joined the weekend edition from October 2 to November 28, 2010; now a TWC Storm Specialist)
- Nick Walker (last official anchor; left in September 2010 for Day Planner; now no longer at TWC)

Weekend Version - October 4, 2003 to March 25, 2012

- Adam Berg (left in January 2011 for Weather Center; now with WTVJ in Miami/Fort Lauderdale)
- Kim Cunningham (Perez) (left in January 2011 for Weather Center; now no longer at TWC)
- Kristin Dodd (laid off by TWC in February 2009)
- Bill Keneely (departed in April 2010; now no longer at TWC, does real estate in Georgia)
- Maria LaRosa (last official anchor; departed in March 2012 for First Outlook and Your Weather Today; now with WNBC-TV in New York)
- Samantha Mohr (departed in April 2010, now with WXIA-TV)
- Carl Parker (left in November 2010 for Day Planner)
- Todd Santos (last official anchor; left in March 2012 for Weekend Now and Weather Center Live; now with WIVB-TV in Buffalo)
- Heather Tesch (left in November 2010 for Day Planner; now no longer at TWC)
