= Jim Cantore =

American meteorologist

- Born: James D. Cantore; February 16, 1964 (age 62); Waterbury, Connecticut, US
- Education: Lyndon State College (Northern Vermont University - Lyndon, B.S., Meteorology, 1986)
- Occupations: Meteorologist, The Weather Channel
- Years active: 1986–present
- Known for: Meteorologist on the Weather Channel
- Spouse: Tamra Zinn (m. 1990; div. 2009)
- Children: 2

James D. Cantore (born February 16, 1964) is an American meteorologist, best known as an on-air personality for The Weather Channel.

== Early life ==
Cantore was born on February 16, 1964 in Beacon Falls, Connecticut. He is of Italian descent. His passion for weather developed during the Great Blizzard of 1978, and his father motivated him to further pursue a career in meteorology. Growing up, he lived in White River Junction, Vermont, and attended Hartford High School, where he graduated in 1982.

== Career ==
Cantore graduated from Lyndon State College in 1986. The Weather Channel gave him his first job out of college in July of that year and he has worked there ever since. Cantore has become one of the best-known meteorologists on American television. Algis Laukaitis of the Lincoln Journal Star referred to Cantore as the "rock star of meteorologists".

Cantore has been lauded for his ability to "break down" complicated weather events into terms the average viewer can understand. Cantore is often selected to go to report on severe weather events. Since the ratings for the Weather Channel increase during these events, Cantore has become a recognizable figure. In particular, viewers' association of Cantore's presence with incoming or in-progress severe weather events became so strong that the Weather Channel lampooned it in a one-minute 2011 commercial spot in which Cantore goes on a beach vacation, panicking nearby beachgoers and locals who take his presence as an ominous sign.

Though he is best known for his live field coverage of major weather events (such as Hurricanes Andrew, Bonnie, Mitch, Floyd, Isabel, Katrina, Rita, Ike, Gustav, Irene, Sandy, Matthew, Irma, Michael, Dorian, Isaias, Laura, Ian, Idalia, Francine, Helene, and Milton), his contributions go well beyond severe weather field reporting. His early work at TWC included developing the audience's favorite Fall Foliage Forecast. He has reported on events such as the Space Shuttle Discovery launch, the "Winter X Games," PGA tournaments, NFL games, and more. Cantore is a member of both the National Weather Association and the American Meteorological Society. He holds the AMS Television Seal of Approval. He also received the NOAA-David S. Johnson Award in 2003 for his innovative use of environmental satellite technology.

Aside from live reporting for TWC, Cantore also serves as the narrator on the TWC series Storm Stories. He also narrates Local On The 8s (excluding the national version).

He was featured at the beginning of the ECHL's Stockton Thunder entrance video saying "Hello, this is meteorologist Jim Cantore from the Weather Channel; a special weather advisory has been issued for the Central Valley—a 100% chance of thunder."

During NBCUniversal's ownership of The Weather Channel from 2008 to 2018, Cantore occasionally filled in for Al Roker on The Today Show. He was also in London hosting weather segments for NBC during the 2012 Summer Olympics.

== Viral videos ==
On January 28, 2014, while doing a live on-location report at the College of Charleston in Charleston, South Carolina, Cantore was charged by a student named Colin Marcelli. Cantore noticed the charge and kneed Marcelli in the groin. Marcelli immediately ran off. Cantore never broke his train of thought nor appeared frazzled during the incident. A recording of the shot has gained upwards of two million views on YouTube.

On February 14, 2015, while covering the impacts of Winter Storm Neptune along the South Shore of Massachusetts, an intense band of thundersnow struck the area, causing Cantore to react excitedly to the presence of the ultra-rare phenomenon. The video of his reaction now has over 5,000,000 views on YouTube.

On October 10, 2018, while covering landfall of Hurricane Michael in Panama City Beach, Florida, Cantore was forced to quickly dodge a flying piece of lumber while reporting live. Video of the incident was viewed on Twitter more than 500,000 times in the hour after its occurrence.

On September 28, 2022, while covering Category 5 Hurricane Ian, Cantore was hit by a flying tree branch in the eyewall of the storm at Punta Gorda, Florida. The video went viral on Twitter and garnered millions of views in under 24 hours.

== Personal life ==
Cantore was married to Tamra Zinn for almost 20 years. They have two children together, Ben and Christina. They met while working at the Weather Channel with Tamra in charge of public relations for Cantore. They were married in 1990 and divorced in 2009.

Cantore's former wife has Parkinson's disease and his two children both have Fragile X syndrome. Cantore does charitable work for FRAXA, the Fragile X Research Foundation, and the Parkinson's Unity Walk. He also contributes his time to Make-a-Wish Foundation events around the country and he has also served as a celebrity cabinet member with the American Red Cross.

In 2018, he was dating CNN journalist Andrea Butera. He has been in a relationship with KATC meteorologist Jobie Lagrange since 2023. Lagrange met Cantore when she was still in college, and the couple has a 29-year age difference.

== Narratives ==
- Storm Stories
- IntelliStar 2
- IntelliStar 2 Jr.
