= The Weather Channel =

- Country: United States
- Broadcast area: Continental United States (including Hawaii, Puerto Rico, US Virgin Islands) and the Bahamas
- Headquarters: Atlanta, Georgia, U.S.

Programming
- Languages: English and Spanish
- Picture format: 1080i (HDTV); 480i (SDTV; letterboxed)

Ownership
- Owner: Allen Media Group
- Parent: Weather Group Television, LLC
- Sister channels: Weatherscan; Local Now; Entertainment Studios Networks; Justice Central

History
- Launched: May 2, 1982; 44 years ago

Links
- Website: weather.com

Availability

Streaming media
- Official service: streamtwc.com (requires subscription or trial to access content)
- Service(s): Frndly TV, FuboTV, Hulu + Live TV, YouTube TV

The Weather Channel (TWC) is an American pay television channel owned by Weather Group, LLC, a subsidiary of Allen Media Group. The channel's headquarters are located in Atlanta, Georgia. Launched on May 2, 1982, the channel broadcasts weather forecasts and weather-related news and analysis, along with documentaries and entertainment programming related to weather. A sister network, Weatherscan, was a digital cable and satellite service that offered 24-hour automated local forecasts and radar imagery. Weatherscan was officially shut down on December 12, 2022. The Weather Channel also produces outsourced weathercasts, notably for CBS News and RFD-TV.

As of November 2023, the Weather Channel is available to approximately 68 million pay television households in the United States—down from its 2013 peak of 101 million households. Its influence continues to decline with growing access to smartphones and online sources.

In August 2023, it was announced that IBM was selling the Weather Company and its assets to the private equity firm Francisco Partners.

== History ==
The Weather Channel was founded on July 18, 1980, by television meteorologist John Coleman (who had served as a chief meteorologist at ABC owned-and-operated station WLS-TV in Chicago and as a forecaster for Good Morning America) and Frank Batten, then-president of the channel's original owner Landmark Communications (now Landmark Media Enterprises). The channel launched at 8:00 p.m. Eastern Time on May 2, 1982. Originally, regional and local information was obtained from the National Weather Service for broadcast. Since 2002, all forecasting has been done on-site in Atlanta.

=== NBCUniversal, Bain, and Blackstone ownership ===
On January 3, 2008, Landmark Communications put the Weather Channel and its assets up for sale. On July 6, 2008, NBC Universal, Bain Capital, and Blackstone Group agreed to jointly purchase the Weather Channel from Landmark, making it the channel's first ownership change in 26 years. The sale was finalized on September 12, 2008.

NBC Universal also owned NBC Weather Plus, a rival service which was carried by and featured content from the NBC television network's local network affiliates; that service announced its discontinuation three months later. Over-the-air digital subchannels carrying Weather Plus have since switched to the similarly formatted the Local AccuWeather Channel, kept the Weather Plus engine, or switched affiliations to other networks such as This TV or the Retro Television Network; some have shut down entirely.

From November 2008 to February 2009, the Weather Channel laid off seven long-time on-camera meteorologists: Kristina Abernathy, Eboni Deon, Kristin Dodd, Rich Johnson, Cheryl Lemke, Mark Mancuso and Dave Schwartz (Schwartz would return to TWC in April 2014, but died of cancer on July 30, 2016). With the exception of Deon, all had been on the air for more than ten years, and three of them had been employed by the network for more than twenty years.

In July 2010, the Weather Channel terminated Bill Keneely, the last of the original on-camera meteorologists who appeared on the network's first broadcasts in 1982. In December of that year, the network also laid off on-camera meteorologist Nicole Mitchell, who later would file a lawsuit against the Weather Channel in 2012, alleging that she had been terminated because the channel's new owners disapproved of the time required by her simultaneous duties as a captain in the U.S. Air Force Reserve as one of the "Hurricane Hunters" team; such reserve duties are protected by U.S. law (Mitchell later served as the chief meteorologist at Al Jazeera America, which for a time also employed Eboni Deon).

Inevitably, the merger of NBC on-air meteorologists began in May 2009. Former NBC Weather Plus meteorologist Todd Santos joined the Weather Channel on May 2 of that year. Al Roker of NBC's Today began hosting a one-hour morning program called Wake Up With Al, alongside meteorologist Stephanie Abrams later in the summer.

However, for New York City-based forecasting operations (those utilized for forecasts on MSNBC and CNBC, for instance), the former NBC Weather Plus forecasting, radar and graphics systems remain in place, with banners changed to fit the Weather Channel's graphics scheme. On September 10, 2009, the Weather Channel co-founder Frank Batten died.

==== 2012 to 2018 ====
In January 2012, David Kenny took over as chief executive officer of the Weather Channel, replacing former AOL executive Mike Kelly, who had been appointed as the company's CEO in the summer of 2009. Although all operations, sales support and marketing and the bulk of employees are located in the headquarters in Atlanta, Kenny declined to move there, and continues to live in Boston as a remote worker.

Later in 2012, the Weather Channel's holding company changed its name from the Weather Channel Companies to the Weather Company. The company also purchased competing weather service and website Weather Underground the same year. On March 10, 2015, Verizon FiOS dropped the Weather Channel and WeatherScan for their rival AccuWeather.

On September 9, 2015, the channel announced a phased overhaul of its programming schedule during 2016, in which the channel would gradually shift its focus back towards a forecast-based lineup. The channel cancelled Wake Up with Al, citing high production costs in New York City compared to Atlanta. It announced that AMHQ would be refocused on weather, eliminating lifestyle segments, with Stephanie Abrams becoming host and original host Sam Champion as a contributor for its prime time schedule starting November 2.

The network also announced it would no longer greenlight original long-form programming, and expanded live forecast programming on its schedule throughout 2016 after all remaining long-form programs already in development concluded their runs. In a memo sent out to network staff by Weather Company CEO David Kenny, it explained its refocus on weather-based programs was done so that "our most passionate fans come to us for the weather and the science behind the weather, not our original shows." Around 50 TWC employees–including production, engineering, and financial staff–were laid off, and the television channel's budget was reduced to shift resources to the company's Internet and mobile properties.

The channel's original format was similar to that of a news and information cable network. Since the creation of the series Atmospheres in 2000 and Storm Stories in 2003, the Weather Channel had seen a gradual transition toward a mix of weather forecasting and weather-related entertainment programming that paralleled the launch of sister network Weatherscan, the evolution of the always-on "L" bar/weather ticker, the development of weather.com and popular branded mobile phone applications, and the increased viewing and interest in documentary programs on the topic of weather.

In November 2013, the channel introduced a new initiative of "weather all the time" in response to the criticism. All original programming–which was rebranded under the tagline Natural Drama – now had direct relevance to weather-related subjects, and the network emphasized its promise to interrupt original programming either regionally or nationally during major weather events. In addition, the Weather Channel extended the display of its lower display line (which was revamped with a new graphics package) to commercial breaks and through entire broadcasts of its original programs.

In August 2015, reports surfaced that the Weather Company's owners were considering a sale of all or part of the venture, having hired Morgan Stanley and PJT Partners to explore their options. On October 28, 2015, it was announced that IBM would acquire most of the Weather Company's assets, including weather.com, Weather Underground, the related mobile applications, and their underlying data platforms, for an undisclosed amount.

IBM planned to leverage its Watson technology as part of the acquisition, foreseeing its use for weather analytics and predictions. The deal, which closed the following January, does not include the Weather Channel itself, which remained owned by the Bain/Blackstone/NBCUniversal consortium, and entered into a long-term licensing agreement with IBM for use of its weather data and "The Weather Channel" name and branding.

=== Allen Media Group ownership ===
In August 2016, reports surfaced that Sinclair Broadcast Group had expressed interest in acquiring ownership of the Weather Channel.

On March 22, 2018, Byron Allen's Entertainment Studios announced its acquisition of the Weather Channel's television assets from the NBCUniversal/Bain/Blackstone partnership. The actual value is undisclosed, but was reported to be around $300 million. The channel's non-television assets, which were separately sold to IBM two years prior, were not included in the sale.

In the early morning of April 18, 2019, the Weather Channel was temporarily unable to air live programming because of what it called a "malicious software attack" on their network. Previously taped shows were aired while engineers worked with backup equipment, and live programming returned to normal within a few hours (at the time, AMHQ). The perpetrators of the malware attack were never identified.

In May 2022, on the Weather Channel's 40th birthday, it launched a new direct-to-consumer subscription-based app.

In August 2023, IBM announced it would be selling its weather unit and the Weather Channel's subsidiaries and apps to the Francisco Partners. As a part of the deal, IBM would retain the company's weather data, which it uses to power artificial intelligence models to sell its enterprise clients for NASA.

In January 2025, Allen Media Group announced plans to have local weather coverage on its sister Allen Media Broadcasting television stations be centralized from TWC and its Atlanta studios, including use of its meteorologists and forecasting technology. AMG argued that this change would "dramatically improve reporting capabilities, especially in high-stakes weather situations" and provide "additional visual storytelling capabilities". The change will result in planned layoffs of meteorologists from stations across 21 media markets, with some being reassigned to work from Atlanta. AMG's announcement faced criticism over how it would impact severe weather coverage, along with the plan to lay off meteorologists with strong connections to their respective communities. WBMA chief meteorologist James Spann stated that he "hate[d] that so many colleagues are involved in this", but admitted that "media consumption is radically different now, and we have to change how our products and services reach you". On January 23, 2025, it was reported that AMG had elected to maintain some of its local meteorologists instead, citing feedback and criticism over the announcement.

=== International versions ===
Over the years, attempts to broadcast international versions of TWC–apart from the Australian version of the Weather Channel (now News24 Weather)–have failed. TWC operates websites that provide localized forecasts in Brazil, France, Germany, India, Latin America and the United Kingdom, but some of these sites may not have developed since 2003. The Weather Channel shares radar imagery and forecasts with the Weather Network/MétéoMédia in Canada, particularly for the Weather Channel's Canadian forecasts.

- A U.K. version of the Weather Channel operated from September 1, 1996, to January 30, 1998, when it was shut down due to low viewership. On satellite, it broadcast for five hours each day, from 6 am until 11 am. It shared channel space with Sky Movies Gold/Sky Box Office 2, The Racing Channel and Galavisión. On cable, it was generally on air for 24 hours but it was only carried by some companies as others chose to carry rival service the Weather Network which also launched in the UK in 1996. Both were designed for cable as it had local weather information for specific regions.
- TWC formerly operated The Weather Channel Latin America, a Spanish-language network serving Mexico, Puerto Rico and South America. This network launched in 1996 and an accompanying Brazilian Portuguese-language feed launched in 1998. It ceased operations on December 20, 2002, due to budget cuts. The channel's three original on-camera weather presenters were Paola Elorza, Sal Morales, and Mari Carmen Ramos; all three left the channel within a year of its launch and respectively went on to work for Univision in Miami, Telemundo in Los Angeles, and CNN International in Atlanta.

== Ratings and reception ==
As of September 2018, the Weather Channel was received by approximately 79.128 million households that subscribe to a pay television service throughout the United States. Americans regard the Weather Channel as the most trustworthy media organization, according to a 2022 poll by The Economist and YouGov.

== Local on the 8s ==
Local on the 8s (or the Local Forecast) is a program segment that airs on the American network the Weather Channel. It provides viewers with information on current and forecasted weather conditions for their respective area; a version of this segment is also available on the channel's national satellite feed that features forecasts for each region of the United States. The name comes from the timing of the segment, as airs at time slots that end in "8" (examples: 9:18 and 12:48); because of this manner of scheduling, the forecast segments air on the channel in ten-minute intervals. From 2006 to 2013, each forecast segment had usually been preceded by a promo for one of the Weather Channel's programs or services, leading into the segment with the announcer stating "And now, your Local on the 8s". On November 12, 2013, the promo segment was replaced by an intro that was built into the Local on the 8s segment. As of April 2018, the segment airs at approximately :18 past each hour. It also usually airs at approximately :48 past each hour during live Weather Channel broadcasts. On July 11, 2023, the music for Local on the 8s was replaced with band and jazz music.

== Related services ==
=== Television ===
Service	Description
The Weather Channel HD	The Weather Channel launched a high definition simulcast feed – which broadcasts in the 1080i resolution format – on September 26, 2007, initially available on DirecTV. As of 2014, all of the network's programming is currently produced in high definition (with the exception of It Could Happen Tomorrow, Full Force Nature and older episodes of Storm Stories), which is presented on the standard definition channel in a modified letterboxed format that fills space that would usually be filled by black bars with weather information provided by the Lower Display Line at the bottom of the screen. The Weather Channel HD is carried on most major cable and satellite providers (such as Comcast Xfinity, Time Warner Cable, Cox Communications, Cablevision, AT&T U-verse, Charter Communications, DirecTV and Dish Network), many of which added the HD feed throughout the fourth quarter of 2007 and the first quarter of 2008. When the HD feed was launched, none of the channel's programming was actually presented in high definition, outside of a national "satellite" version of the "Local on the 8s" segment; Epic Conditions and WeatherVentures became the channel's first two programs to be presented in HD, when they premiered on October 1, 2007. TWC began broadcasting studio programming in high definition on June 2, 2008, with the introduction of a new studio that features various environmentally friendly technologies. The IntelliStar 2, the seventh-generation STAR system and the first to generate graphical weather data in HD, was officially released in July 2010 (although similar to previous recent STAR systems, among its modifications include an animated Lower Display Line and a Vocal Local narration track recorded by TWC meteorologist Jim Cantore). The system was gradually rolled out to major U.S. cable providers strictly for use on the HD feed, and would not replace existing operational STAR units from IntelliStar and older used on TWC's standard definition feed or Weatherscan, making it one of the few channels which by necessity does not have an "autotune to HD" version for providers that utilize set-top boxes allowing HD tuning to standard definition channel positions, unless the HD version has local forecast capabilities. As of August 2015, some providers (such as Comcast) are using the IntelliStar 2 on the standard definition channel in some locations. DirecTV began carrying the "Local on the 8s" segment in HD via an app on set-top boxes on September 29, 2009.
The Weather Channel on Demand	The Weather Channel on Demand is the channel's video-on-demand service, offering a selection of episodes of its original series and original specials to digital cable and IPTV providers. Unlike the linear television channel and its sister website, the service does not provide national or local weather forecasts.
Weatherscan	Weatherscan (originally called Weatherscan Local until 2003) was a companion digital cable and satellite channel that was launched in 1999, which maintains a format consisting of local weather forecasts in a continuous loop uninterrupted by commercials. Available in fewer markets than the Weather Channel, it is primarily available on the digital tiers of some cable providers (however, certain systems carry Weatherscan on a basic tier, where the Weather Channel is traditionally carried); a separate feed for satellite subscribers launched on Dish Network in the summer of 2010. Weatherscan's forecast products are generated by an IntelliStar unit at the cable provider's headend, which is configured differently than those systems used by the Weather Channel; the systems feature different graphics and include additional weather products. Weatherscan displays an "L"-bar (similar to that used by the now-defunct NBC Weather Plus) that provides current conditions and weather forecasts for a particular location and its surrounding area at all times during programming, with weather information also being shown on the top right two-thirds of the screen. The channel was discontinued on December 12, 2022.
Local Now	Local Now is a companion over-the-top channel that launched on January 25, 2016. Similar in format to Weatherscan, the service maintains a format consisting of local weather forecasts, traffic reports, and news headlines as well as local news and sports in a continuous loop. The service is distributed to over-the-top streaming services modeled similarly to traditional pay television providers as well as on an app for iOS and Android for those who subscribe to the Weather Channel through pay-TV.

=== Radio and newspaper presence ===
The Weather Channel provides forecasts for satellite radio provider Sirius XM Radio in the United States. Both services run regional forecasts on a single station, and operate several individual stations providing combined local weather and traffic information for major metropolitan areas.

The Weather Channel also simulcast on SiriusXM from 2016 onward during the following storms:

==== 2016 ====
- Hurricane Matthew

==== 2017 ====
- March 2017 North American blizzard
- Hurricane Harvey
- Hurricane Irma

==== 2018 ====
- Hurricane Florence
- Hurricane Michael

==== 2019 ====
- Hurricane Dorian

==== 2020 ====
- Hurricane Isaias
- Hurricane Laura
- Hurricane Sally
- Hurricane Delta
- Hurricane Zeta

==== 2021 ====
- Hurricane Ida

TWC also maintains content partnerships with a number of local U.S. radio stations to provide local forecasts, using announcers separate from the meteorologists seen on the television channel. For some affiliates, the Weather Channel provides a limited amount of live coverage during local severe weather events (with the Georgia-based announcers connected via ISDN). Distribution of TWC radio content is currently handled by Westwood One.

Similarly, the Weather Channel also provides weather reports for a number of newspapers around the United States. This included a half-page national forecast for USA Today, for which TWC provided content until September 2012, when rival AccuWeather replaced the Weather Channel as the paper's forecast provider.

==== 2022 ====
On March 28, 2022, TWC announced a content partnership with CBS News, under which it will provide weather reports on CBS Mornings, the CBS Evening News, and the CBS News streaming network, as well as collaborate on investigative journalism relating to weather and climate.

On May 2, 2022, the Weather Channel en Español launched on Local Now as TWC celebrates their 40th anniversary. TWC en Español has 24/7 coverage. Milmar Ramírez, Henry Golac, Jessica Fernández, Lorena Lim, Albert Martínez, and Abel Hernández leads the team.

==== 2024 ====
As first confirmed by Charter Spectrum, The Weather Channel en Español ceased programming on December 31, 2024 at midnight EDT. Allen Media Group acknowledged this move was to save money.

=== Online services ===
TWC provided numerous customized forecasts for online users through its website, weather.com, including home and garden, and event planning forecasts. Third-party web analytics providers Alexa and SimilarWeb rated the site as the 146th and 244th most visited website in the world respectively, as of July 2015. SimilarWeb rates the site as the second most visited weather website globally, attracting more than 126 million visitors per month.

It also provided WAP access for mobile phone users, desktop widgets for quick reference by computer users, and customized weather feeds for individual websites. Cell phone customers could also receive local forecasts from TWC sent to their mobile handsets via SMS by sending a text message with their ZIP code to 42278 (which spells "4cast"). The Weather Channel also provided weather forecasts for other online services including Yahoo!.

In addition, the Weather Channel maintained apps for the iPhone, iPad, Android, Apple TV, Kindle Fire, and Windows mobile and tablet platforms. TWC formerly maintained two versions of its mobile applications: a free version that incorporates advertising and a pay version called "TWC Max" that does not feature advertising, the latter was discontinued in favor of an all ad-supported model on January 6, 2014. Aside from location-based weather forecast information, the apps provided radar maps, and tropical and seasonal updates, as well as social media related functions that track weather-related Twitter messages and allow users to send Facebook friends severe weather alerts. The channel also disseminated severe weather information, and photos and videos submitted by meteorologists and viewers, on its Twitter feed (@TWCBreaking, which also served as a hashtag usable for posts).

In July 2012, the Weather Company (former owner of the Weather Channel) purchased competing weather website Weather Underground. While the Weather Channel already had success with its own mobile apps, it planned to use Weather Underground's large network of digital forecasting and tracking websites to bolster its digital growth. Weather Underground operates separately from the Weather Channel and continues to provide its own forecasts, though its website incorporates some weather news and video content from TWC.

The website weather.com and most of the Weather Channel's digital assets were sold to IBM in January 2016. The Weather Channel as a television operation used weloveweather.tv but this website was shut down in 2023.

==== RetroCast Now ====
On April 2, 2026, the Weather Channel launched on their website a retro-themed feature reminiscent of the 1990s-style of the Weather Channel.

== Programming ==
Weather forecast programming made up TWC's entire schedule prior to its incorporation of weather-related original programming – referred in network promotional materials and press releases as "long-form programming" – in 2000 (with few breakaways from its forecast programs prior to then, outside of educational program The Weather Classroom, an original program produced as part of the cable television industry's Cable in the Classroom initiative). The number of hours devoted to TWC's in-studio forecast programs has steadily eroded since then. The network's live studio programs are aired regularly from 6:00 a.m. to 10:00 p.m. Eastern Time on weekdays and from 6:00 a.m. to 1:00 p.m. Eastern Time on weekends and holidays. America's Morning Headquarters airs weekdays between 6:00 a.m. and 2:00 p.m. Eastern Time, followed by The Weather Channel LIVE, which airs from 2:00 p.m. to 6:00 p.m. Eastern followed by Weather Unfiltered, which airs from 6:00 p.m. to 10:00 p.m. Eastern. On weekends, America's Weekend Headquarters from 6:00 a.m. to 9:00 a.m., followed by Weekend Recharge from 9:00 a.m. to 1:00 p.m., followed by Pattrn from 1:00 to 2:00 p.m. Eastern Time.

The Weather Channel also broadcasts original weather-related documentary/entertainment series and specials. These programs ran throughout the rest of the schedule. During severe weather events affecting portions of the United States, the Weather Channel may preempt original programming in favor of airing extended coverage under the umbrella title Weather Center Live (which changes the color of the word "LIVE" from blue to red) to provide long-form coverage and analysis until its aftermath; in some events, the on-air graphics (including Lower Display Line) can go black-and-red (similar to colors that WCL uses); pre-emptions vary between local (isolated to viewers in the region affected by a particular weather event) and nationwide, depending upon the impact of the weather phenomenon/story and if a local provider utilizes a later model WeatherStar unit that allows the use of dual feeds that can substitute programming with long-form weather coverage in a given area. TWC normally utilizes a different music theme for these events, dubbed "Storm Alert Mode", used for both WCL and LOT8's.

=== Movies ===
In a move that caused controversy with many longtime viewers, the Weather Channel began airing weather-related movies on Friday nights on October 30, 2009. The first feature to be broadcast by the channel was the 2000 film The Perfect Storm.

After December 2009, these weekly movies were discontinued for the time being in favor of running Weather Center, which already aired throughout primetime during the rest of the work week. Despite the controversy, the Friday night film block resumed on March 26, 2010, under the title "Flick and a Forecast," co-hosted by the Weather Channel meteorologist Jen Carfagno and MSNBC contributor Touré, with the documentary Into Thin Air: Deaths on Everest. During the broadcasts, the Lower Display Line that normally appears on TWC shows to provide local weather information (with breakaways during forecast and most long-form programs only for commercial breaks) was removed, appearing only a few times each hour during the film as a substitute for the standard "Local on the 8s" segments, with a translucent TWC logo bug appearing at other times during the film when the LDL was not on-screen.

While the films shown within the "Flick and a Forecast" block were weather-related in some form, some films featured (such as Misery and Deep Blue Sea) had only a minimal tie to weather. On May 31, 2010, NewsBlues reported the Weather Channel's decision to cancel the movie block, due in part to viewer criticism of movies being shown on what is intended as a news and information channel, as well as a snafu that occurred during an April 2010 tornado outbreak that led to a scheduled movie being aired instead of wall-to-wall severe weather coverage. The "Flick and a Forecast" presentations were then replaced by an additional hour of Weather Center and a two-hour block of long-form original programs.

== Notable current personalities ==
Personalities
Name	Position	Time
Stephanie Abrams	America's Morning Headquarters & Pattrn	Weekdays 6am-10am & Weekends 1pm-2pm
Mike Bettes	Weather Unfiltered	Weekdays 6pm-10pm
Chris Bruin	The Weather Channel LIVE	Weekdays 2pm-6pm
Jim Cantore	America's Morning Headquarters	Weekdays 6am-10am
Jen Carfagno	America's Morning Headquarters	Weekdays 10am-2pm
Kelly Cass	America's Weekend Headquarters	Weekends 6am-9am
Lynette Charles	Weekend Recharge	Weekends 9am-1pm
Felicia Combs	The Weather Channel LIVE	Weekdays 2pm-6pm
Paul Goodloe	Weekend Recharge	Weekends 9am-1pm
Dr. Rick Knabb	Weather Unfiltered	Weekdays 6pm-10pm
Molly McCollum	Weekend Recharge	Weekends 9am-1pm
Dr. Greg Postel	America's Morning Headquarters	Weekdays 10am-2pm
Jordan Steele	America's Morning Headquarters & Pattrn	Weekdays 6am-10am & Weekends 1pm-2pm
Alex Wallace	America's Morning Headquarters	Weekdays 10am-2pm
Alex Wilson	Weather Unfiltered	Weekdays 6pm-10pm
Reynolds Wolf	America's Weekend Headquarters	Weekends 6am-9am

=== Reporters ===
- Justin Michaels: National Correspondent

=== Former personalities ===
- Kristina Abernathy: 1995–2009
- John Coleman: Founder of the Weather Channel; deceased
- John Hope: Meteorologist/hurricane expert 1982–2002; deceased
- Betty Davis 2005–2010; Currently Chief Meteorologist at (WPLG 10) Miami
- Vivian Brown: 1989–2015
- Jeanetta Jones: 1986–2006; deceased
- Crystal Egger: 2010–2013; last with KNBC in Los Angeles
- Al Roker: 2009–2015; current co-host of Today
- Dave Schwartz: 1991–2008, 2014–2016; deceased
- Sam Champion: 2014–2016; now at WABC-TV in New York City
- Bob Stokes: 1996–2008
- Anaridis Rodriguez: 2014–2017; now at WBZ-TV in Boston
- Maria LaRosa: Weekend Recharge (2010–2018) now at WNBC in New York City
- Bryan Norcross: 2010-2018, senior hurricane specialist; now at Fox Weather
- Greg Forbes: 1999–2019
- Tom Niziol: 2012–2019, winter weather expert; now at Fox Weather
- Rich Johnson: 1983-1987, forecaster, 1987–2009, 2016–2018 on-camera meteorologist
- Jennifer Lopez: 2000–2008, now with WSB-TV in Atlanta
- Dave Malkoff: Field / Feature reporter (2012–2023), now with CBS News
- Alexandria Steele: 2003–2010, later with CNN, now with WANF in Atlanta
- Kait Parker: 2014–2016
- Mike Seidel: On-Camera Meteorologist, Field Meteorologist (1992–2024, now at Fox Weather)
- Nick Walker: 1999-2019; retired
- Tevin Wooten: 2018-2022, now with NBC10 Boston
- Ari Sarsalari: 2000-2024, now with Fox Weather
- Mark Elliot: 2004-2022
- Chris Warren: 2009-2025
- Carl Parker: 1999-2025, Climate Specialist

== Branding ==
=== Logos ===
The Weather Channel's first logo was a blue rectangular box with rounded edges that debuted with the Weather Channel's first broadcast on May 2, 1982. This logo was revised in 1996, with the corners becoming less rounded and the logo becoming slightly flat. The weather.com URL text was permanently added underneath the logo in 1999. On August 15, 2005, the logo was overhauled again; the logo became a straight-edged square with no white trim on the edge and "The Weather Channel" text became oriented in title-case and left-justified, similar to its Canadian sister channel the Weather Network. A 25th-anniversary logo used in 2007 featured a white square edged in blue connected to the current logo with the text "25 YEARS" inside it in blue.

When NBCUniversal acquired the network in 2008, the network participated in the "Green is Universal" campaign, which occurs twice a year, usually during April and November. The network's logo changes to a shade of green as part of the campaign promoting environmental conservation. Since 2014, the network has utilized a red-colored version of the logo during hurricane coverage; the red logo has also appeared during severe tornado outbreaks.

May 2, 1982–October 1996

October 1996–August 15, 2005

August 15, 2005–present

"Green is Universal" Earth Week logo

The Weather Channel HD logo, 2008–present

=== Slogans ===
- 1982–1983: We Take the Weather Seriously, but Not Ourselves
- 1983–1984: The Cable Television Network for America's Lifestyle
- 1984–1986: Weatherproofing America
- 1986–1991: You Need Us, the Weather Channel, for Everything You Do
- 1991–1996: Weather You Can Always Turn To
- 1996–1998: No Place on Earth Has Better Weather
- 1998–2001: Keeping You Ahead of the Storm
- 2001–2005: Live by It
- 2005–2008: Bringing Weather to Life
- June 2008–late 2008: The Weather Has Never Looked Better
- 2009–early 2010: The Sounds of Weather. Hear It, See It, Live It
- 2013–2020: It's Amazing Out There
- 2020–2024: Get Into the Out There
- 2024–present: Be a force of nature

==== Promotional campaigns ====
- 2015–2016: Where You Get Your Weather Matters
- 2017–2018: Trust in Us to Be There
- late 2018–early 2019: America's #1 Weather Network
- 2019–early 2024: America's Most Trusted TV News Network
- 2024–present: America's Most Trusted News Network

== Controversy ==
=== Cable and satellite carriage disputes ===
==== Dish Network carriage dispute ====
On May 20, 2010, Dish Network announced that it was dropping the Weather Channel at 12:00 a.m. Eastern Time that day in favor of its own similar weather information channel, the Weather Cast. The carriage dispute was over the rates that the Weather Channel asked Dish Network to pay: from 11¢ per subscriber per month to 12¢, a 9% increase, totaling $140,000 per month. The dispute was also over the Weather Channel's programming format shifting from an information-based channel to an entertainment-based service. The Weather Channel said in a statement, "Dish has chosen to be the first distributor to drop the Weather Channel rather than pay the standard industry rates others in the industry have already agreed to pay", and encouraged Dish Network customers to switch to other pay television providers. Dave Shull, senior vice president for programming for Dish Network said the Weather Channel's fees were harder for the satellite provider to justify paying as more people receive weather information through the internet and mobile services: "They're looking for bid increases when I feel like there's a real migration to the Web, and it's difficult to really justify those rate increases at this time."

On May 24, 2010, the Weather Channel announced that it had reached a new multi-year carriage agreement with Dish Network, the financial terms of which were not disclosed. Despite the earlier announcement that the Weather Channel would be dropped, the channel was never officially removed from Dish Network. The Weather Cast ceased operations in anticipation of the launch of a Weatherscan-based service announced as part of the agreement that would provide local weather information for Dish Network customers. The proposed movie scheduled for the Friday after the deal was struck (May 28), Gorillas in the Mist, was dropped in favor of a six-hour marathon of Tornado Road.

==== DirecTV carriage dispute ====
DirecTV removed the Weather Channel from its lineup on January 14, 2014, after the two parties were unable to come to terms on a new carriage agreement; as a result, DirecTV became the first major pay television provider to drop the channel in its history. Two weeks before the channel's carriage agreement was set to expire on December 31 (after which the deadline for a new carriage deal was extended by two weeks), the satellite provider began carrying WeatherNation TV (the successor to the Weather Cast and owned by WeatherNation, LLC) on channel 361 on December 16, 2013–placing the channel next to the Weather Channel's slot on channel 362; WeatherNation replaced the Weather Channel on channel 362–while still being carried on channel 361–when TWC was pulled.

The Weather Channel's chief executive officer David Kenny stated that it offered DirecTV the best rate for its programming (according to SNL Kagan, the Weather Channel's average carriage fee at the time was 13¢ per subscriber), and blasted the satellite provider's removal of the channel by stating that it was putting profits ahead of public safety. Representatives for DirecTV stated that it added WeatherNation TV in response to subscriber complaints regarding the number of reality programs on the Weather Channel, which it estimated had amounted to 40% of its daily schedule (WeatherNation TV, which outside of its carriage by DirecTV is primarily carried on broadcast television stations as a main channel affiliation or a digital multicast service, does not run programming outside of forecasts with the only interruption in its weather coverage coming from affiliates that carry children's programs to fulfill FCC educational programming requirements; however, WeatherNation has been criticized for its very limited amount of live programming, which TWC does provide, especially during significant weather events). DirecTV stated that weather information is also available through broadcast television stations carried as part of its local channel tier, as well as the provider's designated emergency channels. The Weather Channel fought back by airing commercials encouraging people to not subscribe to DirecTV by parodying the provider's popular "Get Rid of Cable" ad campaign.

On April 8, 2014, the Weather Channel and DirecTV both settled on a new agreement (TWC decided to alter its programming lineup by trimming the amount of reality programming on weekdays in half, restricting them to its nighttime schedule, in response to complaints from DirecTV subscribers), with the provider restoring the channel on channel 362 the following day. Access to local weather content using the red button feature did not return until May 2, 2014.

==== Verizon FiOS removal and return ====
Verizon FiOS dropped the Weather Channel and its sister network Weatherscan from its lineup on March 10, 2015, after the two parties were unable to come to terms on a new carriage agreement. The services have respectively been replaced by the AccuWeather Network (which launched on March 10) and a widget provided by FiOS featuring forecast content provided by WeatherBug. No public announcement was made regarding the removal until over 12 hours after TWC and Weatherscan were pulled. The Weather Channel offered a less expensive deal to Verizon FiOS, which rejected the offer. Verizon cited the Weather Channel's frequent use of scare tactics, naming of winter storms and the wide availability of the internet and mobile apps for consumers to access weather content any time of day as the reason for dropping TWC and its services. It is unknown if Frontier FiOS customers in clusters formerly served by Verizon are affected, including (as of April 1, 2016) the recently acquired clusters from California, Texas, and Florida.

A representative for the network said in a statement, "We were disappointed when, without warning late yesterday, March 9, Verizon FiOS dropped the Weather Channel from their lineup while our companies continued to be in active conversations regarding a contract renewal. FiOS customers have enjoyed a bundle of services from the Weather Channel including the network, Weatherscan, On-Demand, a Weather Widget and streaming on mobile devices. During a winter with record-breaking storms and severe weather, the Weather Channel responded with non-stop live coverage, including the ongoing presence of our crews reporting live from hard-hit communities within the Verizon FiOS footprint. This coverage resulted in the Weather Channel being the only major cable network to grow in February."

The Weather Channel had earlier signed renewal agreements with major providers that are members of the National Cable Television Cooperative, including Time Warner Cable and Cox Communications. However, representatives for the channel claimed to be shocked that "Verizon FiOS would deny their subscribers access to the best live weather coverage and expertise that only the Weather Channel can provide." While Verizon claimed it was a long-term business decision (instead of a carriage dispute) that it made, the Weather Channel launched a campaign, originally urging viewers to contact FiOS about restoring the cable channel and its services. But, seeing that Verizon is not planning on bringing the channel and its services back in the near future, the Weather Channel now urges its viewers to switch providers.

After a four-year absence and with the channel under ownership of Entertainment Studios, Verizon FiOS inked a new agreement to bring the Weather Channel back to its lineups on June 24, 2019. The channel has not returned to channel lineups within Frontier FiOS's customer footprint until 2021 with the company's partnership with YouTube TV.

=== Winter storm naming ===
In the fall of 2012, the Weather Channel began to assign names to major winter storm systems. The channel stated the decision to start naming notable winter storms came as a way to more easily spread knowledge and raise awareness. By naming winter storms, TWC stated that the public would find it easier to follow storm information, social media will be able to refer to and discuss the storm, and people will have an easier time referring to the storm after it occurs. However, critics of the Weather Channel insist it is a way to further hype winter weather, especially on the heavily populated East Coast. Critics contend that (south of Boston), many other areas of the United States actually experience much more frequent and intense winter weather than the East Coast, but does not have as large of a media market.

The first winter storm to be named by TWC was a nor'easter that hit the East Coast of the United States in November 2012, which was named after the Greek goddess Athena. During the 2012–13 season, the Weather Channel named 27 winter storms (Athena, Brutus, Caesar, Draco, Euclid, Freyr, Gandolf, Helen, Iago, Jove, Khan, Luna, Magnus, Nemo, Orko, Plato, Q, Rocky, Saturn, Triton, Ukko, Virgil, Walda, Xerxes, Yogi, Zeus and Achilles). During the 2013–14 season, the Weather Channel named 26 winter storms (Atlas, Boreas, Cleon, Dion, Electra, Falco, Gemini, Hercules, Ion, Janus, Kronos, Leon, Maximus, Nika, Orion, Pax, Seneca, Titan, Ulysses, Vulcan, Wiley, Xenia, Yona, and Zephyr). Multiple factors are taken into consideration when deciding whether to name a winter storm. This includes, but is not limited to, predicted snowfall and other precipitation, wind speeds, and the timing of the storm.

The Weather Channel has provided the criteria behind their decisions to name certain storms, in particular Athena, Brutus, Gandolf, Iago, Khan, Luna, Magnus, Nemo, Saturn, and Virgil.

In response, the National Weather Service announced on November 7, 2012, that it would not recognize the Weather Channel's names for winter storms, stating in a press release that it "does not use the name of winter storms in its products." Some commentators have suggested that naming winter storms may give them undue importance in the public eye by drawing parallels to official names given by the National Weather Service to tropical storms, which are significantly more severe and devastating than winter storms. References to the names are generally limited on TWC-provided forecasts seen on NBC's news programs.

Despite the unofficial status of TWC's naming system, the winter storm names are used by news outlets, government agencies, airlines, and utility providers.

== See also ==
- Weather media in the United States
- The Weather Network – A Canadian Category A cable and satellite channel devoted to weather forecasts.
- WeatherStar – A series of proprietary computer units installed at the head end of cable television providers that disseminate weather data.
- The Weather Company – The former parent company of the Weather Channel.
- The Weather Channel Presents: The Best of Smooth Jazz – the first jazz album released by the channel
- NBC Weather Plus
- Fox Weather
