= Morning Glory Funeral Home scandal =

Coordinates: 30.3295°N 81.6424°W

The Morning Glory Funeral Home scandal took place at the Howell Morning Glory Chapel in Jacksonville, Florida, in 1988, and involved improper disposal and burial of bodies by the funeral home's owner, Lewis J. Howell. Investigation eventually revealed bodies stacked in the funeral home without preservation or refrigeration and multiple bodies buried inside single caskets.

== Investigation ==
The scandal first came to light June 7, 1988, when a number of decomposing bodies were found inside the funeral home. Conflicting reports state the bodies were discovered June 6, and reported on the 8th. A total of 36 bodies, including one fetus and three sets of body parts, were uncovered inside the building. Most of the corpses were stacked in a closet, and some had been in the building for as long as a decade.

Later, three caskets buried by the funeral home at Hillside Cemetery, a "pauper's cemetery" where the city's indigent population are buried, were exhumed and found to contain a total of eight bodies and "a bag of mixed bones". The case was investigated by the Duval County Medical Examiner's Office, headed by Chief Medical Examiner Peter Lipkovic.

== Conviction and sentencing ==
Howell was convicted of felony grand theft for accepting money for funerals that were not performed. He was sentenced to one year in prison, but he served only 2 3/4 months and was released in February 1989.

== Reaction ==
The incident led to a tightening of Florida's regulation of the funeral industry.

The case was featured in the Season 3 episode "A Deadly Business" of the cable television documentary series Dr. G: Medical Examiner. Dr. Jan Garavaglia, the star of the series, had recently taken her first post-fellowship job as an associate medical examiner with the Duval County Medical Examiner's Office, and the episode detailed her role in the extensive investigation.

== See also ==
- Tri-State Crematory scandal
