= Storm Stories =

American documentary television program

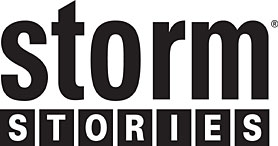
- Also known as: Storm Stories: The Next Chapter
- Genre: Documentary
- Narrated by: Jim Cantore
- Country of origin: United States
- Original language: English
- No. of seasons: 9
- No. of episodes: 371

Production
- Running time: 30 minutes
- Production companies: Towers Productions (2003-2008) (seasons 1-7); Peacock Productions (2009–2010) (seasons 8-9); The Weather Channel

Original release
- Network: The Weather Channel
- Release: January 6, 2003 – August 22, 2010
- Release: August 18, 2019

Storm Stories is an American non-fiction television series that airs on The Weather Channel (TWC) and Zone Reality. It is hosted and narrated by meteorologist and storm tracker Jim Cantore. Storm Stories showcases various types of severe weather, such as tornadoes, hurricanes, rain, floods, etc. Each episode features a famous severe storm, and survivors of it sharing their experiences. The program also features footage of the storm if it is available, but typically a re-enactment is used instead. The video of the storm is often shown while the survivors offer their accounts of it. Often, TWC would air a special week dedicated to one specific type of storm.

Storm Stories is produced by Towers Productions. A syndicated version of Storm Stories is distributed by Litton Entertainment to television stations around the country. The syndicated version includes co-branding opportunities for stations to place, within the program, their local weather anchors, who are usually shown discussing the topic of the episode, and current news. Some syndicated episodes never aired on TWC. In 2009, NBCUniversal (which previously owned TWC until 2018) announced that it would begin handling sales of all of the national ads on Litton's syndicated shows, including Storm Stories. After the show's cancellation in 2010, reruns continued to air until late 2015. On May 21, 2019, The Weather Channel announced a revival of the series as Storm Stories: The Next Chapter which debuted on August 18, 2019.

== Spinoffs ==
- Animal Storm Stories: features storms affecting animals.
- Coast Guard Storm Stories: details the United States Coast Guard and their work during natural disasters, including Hurricane Katrina. Premiered on January 15, 2006.

== Program history ==
Storm Stories launched on January 6, 2003, as the first true serial long-form program on The Weather Channel. The groundwork for Storm Stories was laid by Atmospheres, a weekly long-form program that aired from 2000 to 2003, and signaled the beginning of a change in paradigm at The Weather Channel. Storm Stories, in turn, was the predecessor to a variety of other long-form programs on The Weather Channel, including It Could Happen Tomorrow (2006), Epic Conditions (2007), and When Weather Changed History (2008).

The idea of creating a signature series was proposed to the executive team in 1990 by Jim Alexander (The Weather Channel VP Consumer & Strategic Research). Viewer reactions (development research) to Atmospheres, along with existing weather documentaries, influenced the concepts considered. Content development research with viewers demonstrated the potential for a successful series combining visual evidence of nature's destructive power and first-hand accounts of the experience and its impact on individual lives. Market segmentation research was used to judge the potential audience for the programs, along with the impact on viewers who counted on TWC for information about weather across the United States.

Formerly, Storm Stories featured commercial breaks with the channel's signature Local on the 8s localized forecast. After December 15, 2005, an L-bar/corner forecast appeared for those with the IntelliStar, and a satellite L-bar forecast aired for those with Weather Stars that did not support the L-bar (the Weather Star XL and older models) and those without Weather Stars.

In some episodes, the old TWC logo (1996–2005) was used during the question at the end, which is most difficult to stretch the current TWC logo on the lower display line of the Weather Star XL and IntelliStar. After the credits in the episodes, the 2003 graphic of The Weather Channel logo was used, before a one-minute local forecast. This graphic was removed late in the series's run. For episodes currently on The Weather Channel On-Demand, the current TWC logo surrounded by black is shown during these question segments, to cover the old logo.

Some of the episodes feature aircraft crashes caused by weather, including Air France Flight 358, American Airlines Flight 1420, and USAir Flight 1016 and non-meteorological phenomena such as earthquakes.

In mid-2007, the appearance of Storm Stories' introduction was changed. The new episodes include computer-animated graphics showing the weather situation, and the ending question has a different format. In October 2007, the channel moved the show to 2–3 p.m. Eastern Time. TWC stopped airing the series when the channel began its transition to HD programming on June 2, 2008, but the show returned on February 22, 2009, with 26 new episodes.

Some episodes of the series have been released on DVD.

In Norway, all episodes of Storm Stories: The Next Chapter is made available for streaming online on Viaplay.

== Special weeks ==
- Tornado Week: tornado stories, such as the 1999 Oklahoma tornado outbreak and the 1998 Nashville tornado outbreak.
- Heroes of the Storm: everyday people, and how they saved lives when nature was at its worst.
- Hurricane Week: dangerous or deadly hurricanes, from Andrew to Ivan, as well as typhoons and a tropical storm.
- The Christmas Tree Ship: a holiday storm story for all ages—how people survived a November blizzard on Lake Michigan, and kept the spirit of Christmas.
- Tornado Week: State of Chaos: similar to the original Tornado Week, but about tornadoes in chaos, with coverage of Vortex 2: The great tornado hunt
- Survival Week: tips for surviving the worst types of weather, stories of people in life-threatening situations, shows such as Vortex 2: Target tornado, and more.
