= Bruce David Klein =

Bruce David Klein is an Emmy-nominated producer, director, and writer of television, film, and digital entertainment. He is the founder of Atlas Media Corp. and serves as its president and executive producer.

On the television front, Klein was an early innovator in cable programming, responsible for series such as Dr. G: Medical Examiner (for Discovery Health/TLC), Breaking Vegas and History's Lost & Found (for The History Channel), It Could Happen Tomorrow (The Weather Channel), Factory Floor (National Geographic Channel), and Top 5 and Behind The Bash with Giada DeLaurentiis (Food Network). More recently, he has been responsible for producing and/or executive producing hundreds of hours of television including 5 Star Secrets and Hotel Impossible (in its 8th season for Travel Channel), Playing with Fire (E!), Epic Win (MTV), Stalked: Someone's Watching, and The Mind of a Murderer (Investigation Discovery), Brainwashed and Alien Invasion: Are We Ready? (Discovery Channel), Phowned! (Spike TV), Mary Knows Best (SyFy), Big Brian: The Fortune Seller (TruTV), and What History Forgot (AHC).

On the theatrical documentary front, Klein directed Meat Loaf: In Search of Paradise (2008) and produced Robert Blecker Wants Me Dead. He also co-wrote and directed the independent film The Stranger, starring William Atherton and Roxana Zal.

In Fall 2016, the Klein-produced theatrical documentary Best Worst Thing That Ever Could Have Happened directed by Lonny Price, executive produced by Scott Rudin, and featuring Stephen Sondheim, Hal Prince, Jason Alexander, Mandy Patinkin and others was an official selection of the New York Film Festival. The film was released in theaters on November 18, 2016 to rave reviews—Entertainment Weekly called it "A Triumph", the Washington Post "Heart-piercing", Rolling Stone "Mesmerizing"—and the NY Times said "a sense of wonder animates every frame and leaves you with a misty-eyed glow." The film was included lists of the Best Films of 2016 by the New York Times , The Wrap, and Newsweek —and is currently 94% "Fresh" on Rotten Tomatoes.

In 2021, press reports announced that Klein was working on a feature documentary on screen and stage icon Liza Minnelli.

In 2022, Klein wrote, produced, and directed the HBO feature documentary Icahn: The Restless Billionaire that captures the life and work of the billionaire corporate raider/activist investor Carl Icahn. It premiered on February 15, 2022 to rave reviews. The NY Times called it a "deft documentary portrait" and "right on the money". On July 27, 2023 the film was nominated for an Emmy Award as Best Business & Economic Documentary.

On June 12, 2024, Liza: A Truly Terrific Absolutely True Story, a feature documentary about stage and screen legend Liza Minnelli that was written, produced and directed by Klein, premiered at the Tribeca Film Festival to outstanding reviews. The Hollywood Reporter called it a "gorgeous portrait", Deadline called it a "must-see", and The Wrap said it is "delightful." The New York Times published an extensive Q&A with Klein about the film.

Klein has moderated and appeared on numerous panels for organizations such as NATPE, RealScreen, the Producers Guild, the USA Film Festival and NYU Film School. His work has been featured and reviewed in publications such as The New York Times, Variety, Crain’s New York Business, Entertainment Weekly, TelevisionWeek, and World Screen News. Klein is a member of the National Academy of Television Arts & Sciences, a founding member of the Non-Fiction Producers Association (NPA), and currently serves on the Executive Committee of the National Association of Television Program Executives (NATPE).
