= The Julia Dream =

- Origin: Atlanta, Georgia, USA
- Genres: Alternative rock, gothic rock, new wave, post-punk
- Years active: 2004–present
- Label: WTE Records
- Members: Matt Spatial; Vernon Love; Sacha Alexander; Michael Allen
- Website: Official website

The Julia Dream is a rock band based out of Atlanta, GA founded by bassist Matt Spatial and singer Vernon P. Love. The sound of the band has been described as new wave, psychedelic trance-rock, and "melodic post-punk".

The band name was not derived from the Pink Floyd song of a similar name, but from an actual dream by bassist, Spatial.

The band worked with other members until the lineup was completed with guitarist Sacha Alexander in 2006 and most recently Michael Allen on drums.

In 2005, the band released Lifted: Live on independent record label WTE Records featuring four live tracks from a sold-out concert at Atlanta's Smith's Olde Bar.

The band's debut studio EP Above From Beneath was released on WTE Records in mid-2007 and was selected by retailer Best Buy for regional distribution. The EP was recorded in Asheville, NC by Dan Friedman and mixed at Billy Hume’s The Zone Studios in Atlanta, GA by Joel Mullis. The last track of the EP, "Clean Today", has been featured on the nationally televised cable series Epic Conditions.

The band has performed regularly with other rock, goth, new wave, and industrial acts such as Filter, Augustana, Your Vegas, James Hall, The Awakening, and The Damnwells.

The band has been featured twice on Comcast Cable's Bands On Demand series.
