= Big Sexy =

Big Sexy may refer to:

- Big Sexy (TV series), a 2011 American reality show
- Bartolo Colón, Dominican-American baseball player known as Big Sexy
- Kevin Nash, American wrestler whose ring name Diesel was nicknamed Big Sexy
- Luther Biggs, American wrestler who used the ring name Big Sexy
- McDonnell-Douglas KC-10 Extender, an American tanker and cargo aircraft that was operated by the United States Air Force (USAF) from 1981 to 2024

== See also ==
- Sexyy Red, American rapper also known as Big Sexyy
