= Dr. G =

Dr. G or Doctor G may refer to:

- Dr. G: Medical Examiner, a reality television series
- Doctor G, an Indian Hindi-language film
- 17602 Dr. G., an asteroid
