= Icahn: The Restless Billionaire =

Documentary film on Carl Icahn

- Poster
- Directed by: Bruce David Klein
- Written by: Bruce David Klein
- Cinematography: Axel Baumann
- Music by: Jimmy Stofer
- Production company: HBO Documentary Films
- Distributed by: HBO
- Release date: February 15, 2022
- Country: United States
- Language: English

Icahn: The Restless Billionaire (2022) is an American HBO documentary written, produced and directed by Bruce David Klein. It is an Atlas Media Corp Production.

The documentary examined the life and deals of the self-made billionaire Carl Icahn, including interviews with Icahn, and commentary, interviews and anecdotes from business journalists, Icahn’s family, and personalities offering insight on how Icahn became one of the richest people in the world.

Icahn: The Restless Billionaire explores the deals of eBay, Texaco, TWA, Apple, Herbalife, and Netflix, among others. The documentary addresses the presumed succession by Icahn’s son, Brett Icahn – and includes appearances by Bill Gates, Oliver Stone and journalists Andrew Ross Sorkin, Rana Foroohar, Scott Wapner and Brian Burrough.

The film premiered on HBO on February 15, 2022 and became available to stream on HBO Max.

On July 27, 2023, the film received an Emmy nomination for Best Business & Economic Documentary
