= List of History's Lost & Found episodes =

The following is an episode list for the History Channel television series History's Lost & Found. The series premiered on August 7, 1999 and ended its run on September 4, 2005. In total, 65 episodes were produced during four seasons. A number of episodes were released onto VHS. One was released onto DVD.

== Series overview ==
Season	Episodes	Originally aired			DVD release dates
Season	Episodes	Season premiere	Season finale	Network	Region 1
1	3	August 7, 1999	September 11, 1999	The History Channel	—N/a
2	60	October 6, 2000	December 29, 2000	The History Channel	—N/a
3	2	July 4, 2004	July 21, 2004	The History Channel	—N/a
4	1	September 4, 2005	September 4, 2005	The History Channel	—N/a

== Episodes ==
=== Season 1: 1999 ===
Episode	Segments	Original Air Date
1	Jackie Kennedy’s Bloodstained Dress; Warship Vasa; General Sickles' Leg Bone	8/7/1999
2	Clyde Barrow's death shirt; Oliver Cromwell's head; Dinosaur Skeleton	8/14/1999
3	John Paul Jones's body; The London Bridge; George Washington's False Teeth	9/11/1999

=== Season 2: 2000 ===
Episode	Segments	Original Air Date
4	Flags of Iwo Jima; Rosenberg Jell-O Box; Chang and Eng Bunker's Shared Liver	10/6/2000
5	Hitler's Staff and Parade Car; Hugh Hefner's Pajamas; The African Queen	10/9/2000
6	Saigon Embassy Staircase; Christmas Carol Prompt Copy; Grover Cleveland's Tumor	10/10/2000
7	Nixon's Taping System; Earliest Silly Putty; Body of Little Miss 1565	10/11/2000
8	Eva Braun's Home Movies; King Herold's Alabaster Bathtub; First Issue of Mad Magazine	10/12/2000
9	Alcatraz Escape Heads; Buddy Holly's Glasses; Calvin Coolidge's Electric Horse	10/13/2000
10	Robert E Lee's Surrender Table; Marie Antoinette's Guillotine Blade; Ronald Reagan’s Favorite Booth at Chasens	10/16/2000
11	WWII Surrender Table; James Dean's Motorcycle; Alan Shepard's Six-Iron	10/17/2000
12	Stonewall Jackson's Raincoat; First Monopoly Game; Franz Ferdinand's Assassination Car	10/18/2000
13	Oliver Cromwell's Head; Lone Ranger's Mask; First Video Game	10/19/2000
14	Merry Pranksters Bus; First Portable Vacuum; Ben Franklin's Armonica	10/20/2000
15	Hollywood Sign; Gandhi's Bloodstained Dhoti; First Gas Mask	10/23/2000
16	SAM 26000; First TV Remote Control; Tom Thumb's Wedding Cake	10/24/2000
17	Original Clinton Electric Chair; 1873 Winner Wire Barbed Wire; Togo	10/25/2000
18	First Zippo Lighter; Lindbergh Ransom Note; Captain Kidd's Plea Letter	10/27/2000
19	Confederate Constitution; Genesis Moon Rock; Statue of Laddie Boy	10/30/2000
20	William Shakespeare's Will; Imelda Marcos's Shoes; First Longitude Timekeep	10/31/2000
21	1890 Levi Jeans; Challenger Crew Compartment; Lizzie Borden's Hatchet Head	11/1/2000
22	Autographed Hooverball; Covered Wagon Travel Trailer; Congressional Church Register of Salem	11/2/2000
23	Louis Armstrong's Tape Recordings; One Cent Magenta Stamp; Andy Warhol's Wigs	11/3/2000
24	Lincoln's Deathbed; Marilyn Monroe's Dress; Douglas Bader's Leg	11/6/2000
25	Al Capone's Cadillac; Columbus' Book of Privileges; Original Winnie-the-Pooh Doll	11/7/2000
26	USS Arizona; John Wayne's Alamo Set; The Times Square Ball	11/8/2000
27	Last New York City Checkered Cab; The Maltese Falcon; Benedict Arnold's Oath of Allegiance	11/9/2000
28	The Memphis Belle; Henry VIII's Love Letters; Colonel Sanders' First Pressure Cooker	11/10/2000
29	John Dillinger’s Gun; Lewis and Clark's Packing List; Leadbelly Aluminum Disc	11/13/2000
30	Mummy of John Paul Jones; Theodore Roosevelt's Eye Glasses Case; First Microwave Oven	11/14/2000
31	The Voyager Record; Mark Twain's Writing Bed; Plymouth Rock	11/15/2000
32	Liberace's Mirror Tiled Piano; Paul Revere's Lantern; Able the Space Monkey	11/17/2000
33	Sigmund Freud's Couch; Yes, Virginia Letter; Wright Flyer Cloth	11/20/2000
34	The Letters of Mary Todd Lincoln; Antioch Chalice; First Cellular Phone	11/21/2000
35	Janis Joplin's Porsche; Jumbo's bones; Eniac	11/22/2000
36	Houdini's Water Torture Cell; First Moog synthesizer; Painless Parker's Teeth	11/23/2000
37	St. Valentine's Day Massacre Wall; The Liberty Bell; Mark I	11/24/2000
38	Hitler's Skull; Original La-Z Boy Recliner; Duke Kahanamoku's Australian Surfboard	11/27/2000
39	The Letters of Mary Todd Lincoln; The Origins of the Recreational Vehicle; Jayne Mansfield's Death Car	11/28/2000
40	Lee Harvey Oswald's Ambulance; Original Fairy Photographs; The Nike Waffle Iron	11/29/2000
41	George Washington’s School Books; Original Instant Polaroid Camera; Hoof of Firehorse Twelve	11/30/2000
42	Girder from Hindenburg; Trigger; Sally Rand's Ostrich Feather Fans	12/1/2000
43	Elvis' Letter to Nixon; Man Eating Lions of Tsavo; Corset Busks from Mary Ann Hall’s Brothel	12/4/2000
44	Oscar Prototype; Induction Balance; The Stone of Scone	12/5/2000
45	Cowardly Lion's Costume; The First Transistor; JFK's Whale Tooth	12/6/2000
46	Jim Thorpe's Olympic Medals; Joseph Haydn’s Head; Original Coca-Cola Bottle	12/7/2000
47	First Ike Jacket; First Apple Computer; Rin Tin Tin	12/8/2000
48	The P-38 Glacier Girl; Uncle Tom's Cabin Manuscript; Ty Cobb's Dentures	12/11/2000
49	Nuremberg Laws; Charlie Parker's Plastic Saxophone; First Lionel Train	12/12/2000
50	USS Pampanito; Stanley Milgram's Shock Box; Take Me Out to the Ballgame Lyric Sheet	12/13/2000
51	Henry Ford’s Quadricycle; Mark David Chapman’s Double Fantasy Album; Crown of St. Stephen	12/14/2000
52	Bonnie and Clyde's Death Car; George Washington's Inaugural Bible; Hugh Hefner’s Pajamas	12/15/2000
53	Lyndon Johnson's Tapes; John Lennon's Station Wagon; First Parking Meter	12/18/2000
54	The James Caird; Sun Studios' Sound Board; George S. Patton's Death Cadillac	12/19/2000
55	Larry Kelley's Heisman Trophy; First Mustang Convertible; Log of the Enola Gay	12/20/2000
56	Jack Ruby's Gun; Sense of Smell and Touch Mosaic; Ghetto Milk Cans	12/21/2000
57	Malcolm X's Diary; August Belmont's Subway Car; Ronald Reagan's Favorite Booth at Chasens	12/22/2000
58	Francis Gary Powers' U2 Wing Fragment; Thomas Edison's First Phonograph; Buffalo Bill's Grave	12/25/2000
59	The Spruce Goose; Coat of Horatio Nelson; Original TV Dinner Tray	12/26/2000
60	Abraham Lincoln's Catafalque; Elvis Presley's First Guitar; Pancho Villa's Death Mask	12/27/2000
61	Original Woolworth's Sit-in Counter; Dauphin's Heart; First War Films	12/28/2000
62	Remains of the Unknown Soldier; James Dean's Motorcycle; Warship Vasa	12/29/2000

=== Season 3: 2004 ===
Episode	Segments	Original Air Date
63	The Spirit of America; Watergate Address Book; Charlie Chaplin’s Shoes	7/4/2004
64	The Wright Brothers' plane; The Treasures of King Tut; The Gettysburg Address	7/21/2004

=== Season 4: 2005 ===
Episode	Segments	Original Air Date
65	Car that Carried John F. Kennedy to His Death; John Dillinger's Gun; Civil War General's Amputated Leg	9/4/2005
