= Jonathan Dickson =

American actor

- Born: July 26, 1974 (age 50); Anderson, South Carolina, U.S.
- Occupation: Actor
- Years active: 1997–present
- Website: http://www.jonathandickson.net

Jonathan Macgregor Dickson (born July 26, 1974) is an American actor. He is best known for his role as Professor Blackjack (Edward O. Thorp) on the History Channel's Breaking Vegas series. He has also appeared in such shows as 30 ROCK and Boardwalk Empire. He can be seen shag dancing next to Rachel McAdams and James Marsden in the romantic drama, The Notebook.

== Personal life ==
Dickson was born and raised in Anderson, South Carolina, the son of John and Sandra Dickson, and the brother of Jennifer Dickson Meeks and Jason Dickson. He attended the University of South Carolina in Columbia, SC, and graduated with a major in biology and a minor in chemistry.

== Career ==
Dickson played Dr. Edward O. Thorp in Breaking Vegas. In 2009, he was cast on 30 ROCK, and in 2011 began acting in Boardwalk Empire. In 2012, he played himself on the Bravo reality show, Love Broker. Currently, he is performing standup comedy.

== Filmography ==
=== Film and television ===
Year	Title	Role	Notes
2014	Redemption of the Commons	Blane Fox	VIEW Digital Media
2012	Love Broker	Himself	Bravo Reality Show
2011	Boardwalk Empire	Nucky Thompson's Delivery Man	HBO
2009	30 Rock	News Anchor	NBC/Universal
2008-09	Wisdom Tree	Jimmy/Greg	5 Episodes
2005	Breaking Vegas	Edward O. Thorp (Lead)	History Channel
2004	The Notebook	A Soldier	Avery Pix

=== Theatre ===
Year	Title	Role	Notes
2008	Teenage Chronicles (musical)	Dad	Roy Arias Theatre
2007	I (Heart) U.S.	Chimney	Woolly Mammoth Theatre
2007	American Actor	Various Characters	The Players Club
2004	Neckface & the GetAlong Gang	Various Characters	Chicago City Limits
1998	T.H.E. Club	Chief Seattle (Lead)	Baker's of Boston
1997	Inherit the Wind	The Judge	Electric City Playhouse
1996	West Side Story	A Shark	Town Theatre
1995	Firebird	The Priest	The Koger Center
1994	Petrushka	King's Honor Guard	Little Theatre
1993	The Wizard of Oz	The Scarecrow	River Place Arts Festival
1992	The Sound of Music	Friedrich Von Trapp	River Place Arts Festival
1991	Pied Piper of Hamelin	The Mayor	Ross Touring Company

== Awards and nominations ==
Year	Award	Category	Work	Result
2001	STAR Award	Best Promo	Rookie Award	Won
2002	STAR Award	Best Public Service Announcement	Remember the Dream	Won
