= WeatherVentures =

WeatherVentures is a non-fiction program that aired on The Weather Channel hosted by Meteorologist Jeff Mielcarz. The purpose of this show was to inform people of how weather affects different parts of the United States. It debuted on Monday, October 1, 2007 and was canceled in early 2009. WeatherVentures was one of the first HD programs on The Weather Channel along with Epic Conditions.
