= Jan Garavaglia =

American medical examiner and television personality (born 1956)

- Born: Jan Carla Garavaglia; September 14, 1956 (age 69); Saint Louis, Missouri, U.S.
- Other name: Dr. G
- Education: Saint Louis University (AB, MD)
- Occupation: Chief Medical Examiner
- Years active: 1988–2015
- Spouse(s): Kevin Kowaleski (1980–2006); Mark Wallace (2007–present)
- Children: 2

Jan Carla Garavaglia (born September 14, 1956), sometimes known as "Dr. G", is an American physician and pathologist who served as the chief medical examiner for Orange and Osceola counties in Orlando, Florida, from 2004 until her retirement in May 2015. She came to prominence for handling several high-profile cases, including the deaths of Caylee Anthony and Tracie McBride.

She starred in the series Dr. G: Medical Examiner on the Discovery Health channel which aired from 2004 to 2012. Repeats of the show have aired on the Discovery Life channel, Justice Network, and on Roku Channel, a free-to-stream video service. Garavaglia has appeared on The Oprah Winfrey Show, Larry King Live, The Rachael Ray Show, The Doctors and The Dr. Oz Show. She was also on Head Rush with Kari Byron.

== Early life and education ==
Garavaglia was born in St. Louis, Missouri, to Charles and Jennie Garavaglia. She graduated from Lindbergh High School in 1974. Garavaglia received her bachelor's degree in 1978 from Saint Louis University and a medical degree from the Saint Louis University School of Medicine in 1982. She completed an internship in internal medicine in 1983 and residency in anatomic/clinical pathology at Saint Louis University Hospital in 1987. In 1988, she completed a fellowship in forensic pathology at the Dade County Medical Examiner's Office in Miami, Florida. She is board-certified in combined anatomic and clinical pathology and forensic pathology.

== Family ==
Garavaglia married her first husband in 1980. In 1988, she got her first job as an Associate Medical Examiner in Duval County, Jacksonville, Florida and gave birth to their first son. Garavaglia and her family moved to Georgia in 1991 where she took a job as Associate Medical Examiner for the next two years. In 1993, the family moved once again to San Antonio, Texas where Garavaglia spent the next ten years as a Medical Examiner in the Bexar County Forensic Science Center (Bexar pronounced as 'Bear'). Their second son was born during this time, in 1994. Garavaglia and her first husband later divorced in 2006, and in 2007 she married her second husband, Dr. Mark Wallace, whom she had met years earlier while attending medical school. Wallace made several appearances on Dr. G: Medical Examiner as an expert in infectious disease and internal medicine. The couple reside in Mount Vernon, WA.

== Career ==
One of the first cases Garavaglia worked on as a medical examiner was the Morning Glory Funeral Home scandal, in which 37 bodies, many in advanced stages of decomposition, were found in a funeral home. After several caskets that the funeral director had buried were exhumed, Garavaglia determined that the director had placed multiple persons in single caskets, and pocketed the money he received.

As an associate medical examiner in Bexar County, Texas, Garavaglia autopsied the body of Tracie McBride at the Bexar County Forensic Science Center in San Antonio, Texas. The case was covered on Dr. G. McBride was murdered by Louis Jones, who was executed by the federal government in 2003.

On December 11, 2008, Garavaglia autopsied the remains of a small child that was confirmed to be those of missing Caylee Anthony. Garavaglia testified about her findings during the murder trial of Caylee's mother, Casey Anthony.

In 2008, Garavaglia authored How Not to Die, in which she relates her experiences as a medical examiner to educate readers about how to care for their health and avoid premature death.

On May 18, 2012, Garavaglia delivered the keynote address at the opening ceremonies of the 2012 Science Olympiad National Tournament at the University of Central Florida.

After more than two decades in the practice of forensic pathology, Garavaglia retired from the District 9 medical examiner's office on May 28, 2015. She and her husband retired to her husband's hometown, 90 minutes north of Seattle, Washington.

== How Not to Die ==
How Not to Die: Surprising Lessons on Living Longer, Safer, and Healthier from America’s Favorite Medical Examiner is a book about safe and healthy living written by Jan Garavaglia. The book was released on October 14, 2008, by Crown Publishing, a division of Random House. Using cases from her 20 years of experience as a medical examiner, Garavaglia identifies some lifestyle and behavioral choices that may result in premature death. She also offers advice on how to be smart and proactive about one's health. The Library Journal has called the book "surprisingly entertaining".
