= Murder of Tracie McBride =

American murder case

Tracie McBride
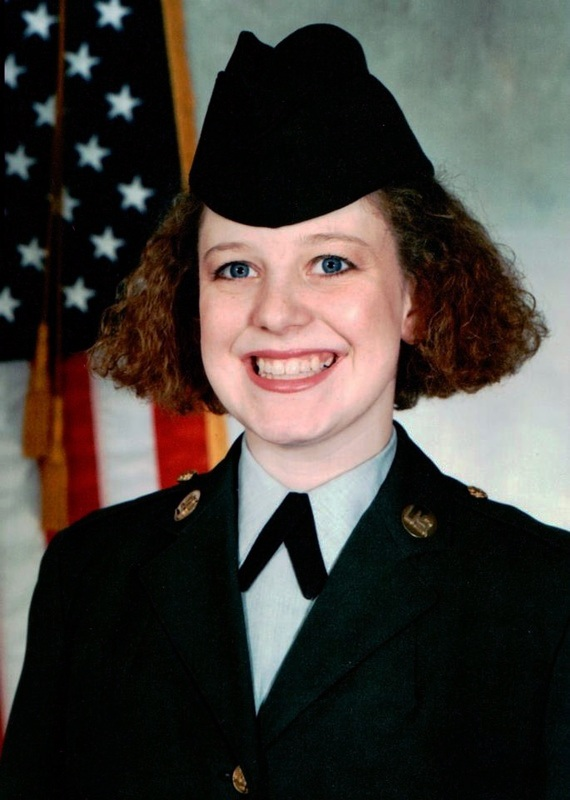
- Born: Tracie Joy McBride; May 27, 1975; Centerville, Minnesota, U.S.
- Died: February 18, 1995 (aged 19); Coke County, Texas, U.S.
- Cause of death: Murder by blunt trauma
- Resting place: Fort Snelling National Cemetery, Minnesota
- Military career
- Allegiance: United States
- Branch: United States Army
- Service years: 1993–1995
- Rank: Private

On February 18, 1995, 19-year-old American soldier Tracie Joy McBride was kidnapped, raped, and murdered by 44-year-old American soldier Louis Jones Jr. in Texas. Jones abducted McBride from Goodfellow Air Force Base and raped her at his house before bludgeoning her to death under a highway bridge in Coke County. He had, on another occasion, sexually assaulted his ex-wife Sandra Lane and was arrested on March 1, and the ensuing police investigation found that he was also responsible for raping and murdering McBride. Jones was tried and convicted in the U.S. federal court system for kidnapping resulting in death; his crime was a federal case since it had begun on a military base. The rape was the prime aspect to the murder, making it a capital offense. Following his initial denials, Jones eventually confessed that he had raped McBride in addition to murdering her, and was sentenced to death. He later tried to contest his sentencing on the grounds that he had been suffering from Gulf War syndrome, but his appeals were rejected. Prosecutors argued that Jones had displayed violent tendencies even before the Gulf War, citing four incidents in which Jones had beaten up army colleagues.

On March 18, 2003, the 53-year-old Jones was executed by lethal injection.

Mark Miller of Newsweek characterized Jones' case as unusual due to his Gulf War syndrome defense strategy.

== Crime ==
On February 18, 1995, 44-year old Louis Jones drove onto Goodfellow Air Force Base in San Angelo, Texas, and kidnapped Private Tracie Joy McBride, a 19-year old from Centerville, Minnesota. Jones was looking for his ex-wife, whom he had abducted and raped two days prior, but instead decided to kidnap McBride. McBride was at a laundry facility and on the telephone with a friend when she was abducted. Two privates tried to rescue McBride, but Jones rendered one, Private Michael Peacock, unconscious by hitting him.

Jones took McBride to his house, raped her, and held her in a closet. He forced McBride to use hydrogen peroxide on herself, washed McBride's clothes, and forced McBride to walk on towels; these efforts were part of an attempt to conceal the crime by hiding any fibers and other possible evidence. He then drove McBride to a remote area and beat her to death with a tire iron. McBride died under a bridge off U.S. Route 277 in Coke County, Texas, about 27 miles (43 km) north of San Angelo. McBride had been hit in the head at least nine times. Dr. Jan Garavaglia, who was an associate medical examiner in Bexar County at the time of the murder, examined McBride's body. Garavaglia stated that the trauma to her head was "worse than most high-impact car wrecks". Jones likely forced McBride to walk to the point where she was killed; only mud was found on her boots, and no scuff marks were present. McBride's body was found clothed in her U.S. Army battle uniform, itself in excellent condition; the clothing had no forensic evidence of rape. The undergarments were not present.

Jones was arrested on March 1 by the San Angelo Police Department for sexually assaulting his ex-wife, Staff Sergeant Sandra Lane, after she filed a complaint with the Air Force's Office of Special Investigations (OSI). OSI agents made an inquiry to Jones on whether he was involved in McBride's abduction, and Jones confessed to killing her; he then led authorities to McBride's body. Initially, Jones said he did not rape McBride. McBride's body was autopsied by Garavaglia at the Bexar County Forensic Science Center in San Antonio, Texas. Due to the unusually cool weather and the placement of the body under a bridge, the body was well preserved. Despite Jones' efforts to conceal the rape, Garavaglia was able to determine that Jones had raped McBride, and this fact allowed federal prosecutors to ask for the death penalty. Jones later confessed to a psychiatrist to raping McBride.

== Background ==
=== Louis Jones Jr. ===
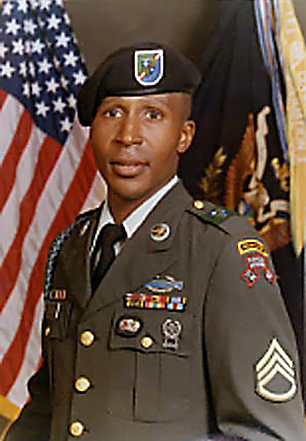
Louis Jones, Jr.

Jones, born on March 4, 1950, was a native of Shelby County, Tennessee, and grew up in Chicago. According to testimony presented at his criminal trial, Jones experienced sexual and physical abuse.

He served in the Army for 22 years. Richard A. Serrano of the Los Angeles Times wrote, "It was in the Army where he excelled." Jones, a member of the U.S. Army Rangers, participated in the Invasion of Grenada and the Gulf War of 1991. He was the leader of a platoon in Grenada, and he received a Commendation Medal due to his actions during a ground attack in Iraq. He became a master sergeant and on his retirement in 1993 was honorably discharged from the Rangers. At the time of the crime, he worked on base as a bus driver.

Jones was married three times, and he had a daughter, Barbara, whom he raised on his own. One of his wives, Sandra Lane, was an Army staff sergeant. He became estranged from her, and she noted changes in his behavior after he returned from Iraq. Jones had no previous criminal record. Before the killing, he worked low-paying jobs and received low grades in university courses. Lane filed an official complaint with the OSI on March 1, 1995, stating that, on February 16 of that year, Jones had kidnapped her, made her take money out of her bank account, and committed sexual assault against her while at his residence.

=== Tracie McBride ===
Tracie Joy McBride (May 27, 1975 – February 19, 1995), a graduate of Centennial High School in Circle Pines, Minnesota, was at the base for a two-week advanced intelligence training. McBride aspired to become a music teacher. McBride joined the United States Army after her high school graduation, intending to fund her university education; she hoped to have her degree completed prior to the end of her tour of duty. At the end of her life, McBride was in a romantic relationship with a member of the U.S. Marines. She was assigned to Goodfellow in early February 1995 after completion of training, at the Defense Language Institute at the Presidio of Monterey in Monterey, California. McBride was kidnapped 10 days after her arrival.

== Trial, appeals, and execution ==
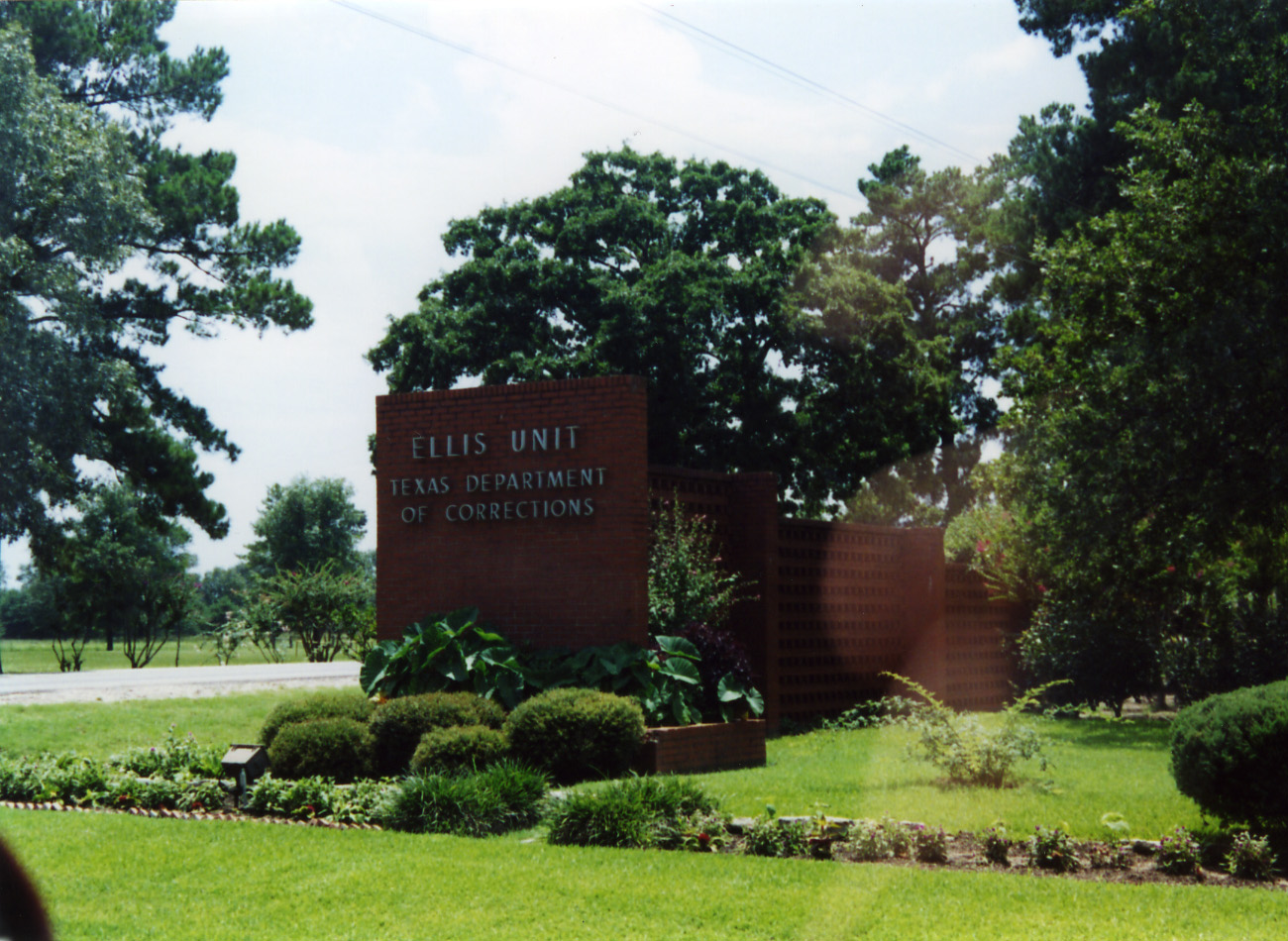
Ellis Unit, where Jones was initially confined by Texas authorities

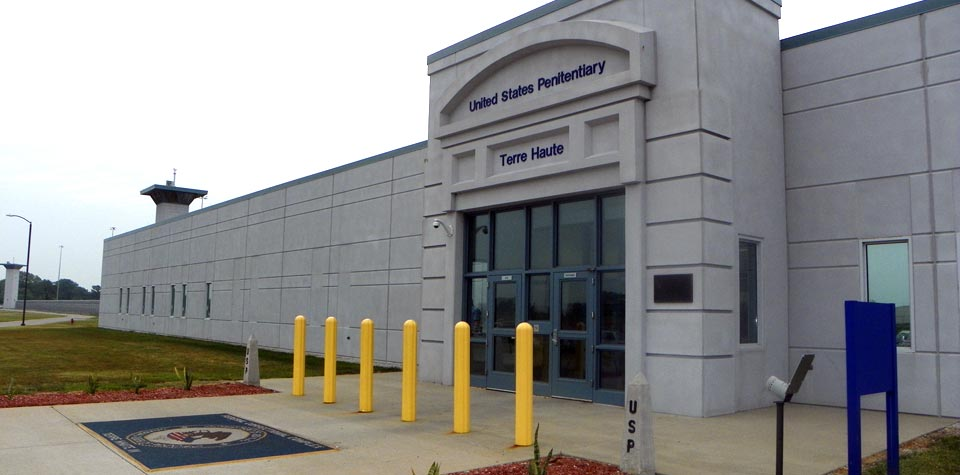
United States Penitentiary, Terre Haute, where Jones was held on federal death row and executed

=== Trial ===
Jones, indicted in March 1995, was tried in federal court in Lubbock, Texas, since he had kidnapped McBride from a military base. His specific charge was "kidnapping within special maritime/territorial jurisdiction resulting in death". U.S. Attorney Tanya K. Pierce was the prosecutor. McBride's family supported the prosecutor's decision to seek the death penalty for Jones. The trial was moved from San Angelo to Lubbock due to the news coverage in the former city.

The trial began on October 16, 1995. Nine members of the twelve-person jury were female and 3 were male. Jones stated that he committed the crime due to trauma he received during his military duties, indicative of Gulf War syndrome. Evidence showing brain damage to Jones was presented. Jones was convicted on October 23, after two days of testimony and 65 minutes of deliberation from the jury. After finding that Jones had intentionally killed McBride, the jury proceeded to sentencing.

The sentencing phase involved the jury deliberating for 6.5 hours. The prosecution alleged four statutory aggravating circumstances and three non-statutory aggravating circumstances. The jury unanimously found two statutory aggravating circumstances: Jones killed McBride during the commission of a kidnapping and the murder involved torture or serious physical abuse to McBride, referring to the rape. The finding of statutory aggravating circumstances officially made the McBride's murder a capital offense. The jury rejected two other alleged statutory aggravating circumstances: Jones had knowingly put lives other than that of McBride at risk and the murder was premeditated. As for non-statutory aggravating circumstances, the jury unanimously found that McBride's family had suffered from her death and that McBride was vulnerable due to her young age and other characteristics, but rejected the argument that Jones would present a future danger.

The defense presented 11 mitigating circumstances, which a varying number of jurors agreed upon:

1. Jones did not have a significant prior criminal record (6)
2. Jones's capacity to appreciate the wrongfulness of his actions were significantly impaired, regardless of whether the capacity was so impaired as to constitute a defense to the charge (2)
3. Jones committed the murder under severe mental or emotional disturbance (1)
4. Jones suffered physical, sexual, and emotional abuse as a child (4)
5. Jones's military service (8)
6. Jones would not be a problematic inmate (3)
7. Jones is remorseful (4)
8. Jones's daughter (9)
9. Jones was under a great deal of duress and/or stress at the time of the murder (3)
10. Jones suffered from numerous neurological or psychological disorders (1)
11. Other factors in the Jones's background or character mitigate against a verdict of death (0)

In addition, seven jurors found that the testimony of Jones's ex-wife, Sandra Lane, was a mitigating factor. Although Lane testified that Jones raped her in his apartment two days before he killed McBride, she also said that he seemed "very crazed" and was "spinning out of control, bouncing from thought to thought".

On November 3, 1995, the jury came back with a unanimous recommendation for death. On June 11, 1996, Jones was entered into the Texas Department of Criminal Justice (TDCJ) as prisoner #999195 under an agreement with federal authorities. The State of Texas housed its male death-row inmates at the Ellis Unit near Huntsville, Texas. On July 13, 1999, he was moved into federal custody, to the newly opened men's death row at the United States Penitentiary in Terre Haute, Indiana. He was Federal Bureau of Prisons (BOP) prisoner #27265-077.

=== Appeals ===
Throughout the appeals process, Jones' lawyer, Tim Floyd, continued to argue that his death sentence should be commuted to life imprisonment since nerve gas from Iraq had damaged his brain. Floyd contacted University of Texas Southwestern Medical Center epidemiology department head, Dr. Robert Haley, who published the first major studies related to Gulf War syndrome, and asked him to review his client's medical records; Haley argued that Jones had sustained brain damage and that it "was responsible for the personality changes that contributed significantly to the tragic events of his crime." U.S. senator Kay Bailey Hutchison argued that Jones should have his brain scanned to check for damage before any death sentence would be carried out. Ross Perot also called for a commutation of the sentence to life without parole. Throughout the appeal process, McBride's family advocated for Jones' execution.

In 1998, the United States Court of Appeals for the Fifth Circuit found that two of the non-statutory aggravating circumstances appeared to be redundant. However, they upheld the death sentence since they found that the aggravation still outweighed the mitigation.

In 1999, the U.S. Supreme Court declined to overturn Jones' death sentence. Jones' final appeal for clemency from then-president of the United States George W. Bush and his final appeal at the U.S. Supreme Court failed on March 17, 2003.

=== Execution ===
On March 18, 2003, Jones was executed by lethal injection at USP Terre Haute, making him the third federal prisoner executed after federal executions resumed in 2001. McBride's family and a friend were present at the execution.

Jones spent his last minutes reciting scripture and singing an old religious hymn. He offered no verbal apology to the McBride family but instead looked at his family in the witness room and mouthed the words "I love you." Asked if he had a last statement, Jones said: "Although the Lord hath chastised me sore, he hath not given me over unto death," from Psalms 118. Jones then started singing "Jesus Keep Me Near the Cross." He broke briefly to twice recite "Thank You Jesus" as the lethal cocktail of drugs began to take hold, eventually reducing his song to a whisper and then to silence.

After Jones's execution, his attorney read a written statement from him: "I accept full responsibility for the pain, anguish and the suffering I caused the McBrides for having taken Tracie from them." He said he would not ask "for forgiveness for the awful things done to Tracie. They continue to feel anguish and pain that will always be felt by them, and I felt forgiveness from the McBrides is something I had no right to ask for."

Jones was the last person executed by the United States federal government until July 14, 2020, when Daniel Lewis Lee was executed by lethal injection.

== Legacy ==
McBride was buried at Fort Snelling National Cemetery in Minnesota. The Tracie Joy McBride Scholarship Fund and its associated event, Tracie's Night, were named after her; the fund is primarily managed by her sister, Stacie McBride-Cox.

The episode "Life Interrupted" of the television show Dr. G: Medical Examiner, first aired in 2007, describes this case.

In Human Behavior in the Social Environment: A Macro, National, and International Perspective, author Rudolph Alexander Jr. wrote that experiences of soldiers during the 2000s Iraq War, in which over 3,700 coming back from the war in 2005 stated that they had fears that they may lose control of themselves or harm another person and that 1,700 reported believing that they were better off dead and considered hurting themselves, "provide support for Jones' claims." 450,000 Americans served in the Gulf War.

== See also ==
- Capital punishment by the United States federal government
- Capital punishment in the United States
- List of people executed by the United States federal government
- List of people executed in the United States in 2003
- List of solved missing person cases: 1990s
- Murder of Vanessa Guillén

Executions carried out by the United States federal government
Preceded by Juan Garza June 19, 2001	Louis Jones Jr. March 18, 2003	Succeeded by Daniel Lewis Lee July 14, 2020
Executions carried out in the United States
Preceded by Michael Thompson – Alabama March 13, 2003	Louis Jones Jr. – Federal government March 18, 2003	Succeeded by Walanzo Robinson – Oklahoma March 18, 2003
