= Breaking Vegas =

American television series

Breaking Vegas is an American television series that premiered on the History Channel in 2004. The series covers the great lengths people have gone to make money, sometimes illegally, from casinos.

Many episodes have to do with cheats who illegally take money from the casino using sleight-of-hand tricks or some sort of gadget. Namely, these scams include pastposting and card marking. Other episodes include famous examples of legal money-making techniques such as card counting. Some episodes are about legal strategies like winning at the craps table by throwing at certain angles using a certain grip with certain numbers at the top, or taking advantage of a worn-out ball bearing and a thus tilted roulette wheel.

The series was inspired by the two-hour History Channel movie entitled Breaking Vegas: The True Story of the MIT Blackjack Team, written and directed by Bruce David Klein and produced by Atlas Media Corp.

The episode "Professor Blackjack" is about MIT professor Edward O. Thorp's (portrayed by Jonathan Dickson) computer-based research on the Kelly criterion that was applied in real Vegas casinos in the form of computer aided card-counting schemes with very successful results. Manny Kimmell (portrayed by Peter Salzer), a known mob associate, provided the venture capital for Dr. Thorp's real life experiment and his contribution is described in the same episode.

== Episodes ==
- "Breaking Vegas"
- "Blackjack Man" — story of Ken Uston
- "Card Count King" – story of Tommy Hyland
- "The Gadget Gambler" – story of Keith Taft
- "The Roulette Assault"
- "Dice Dominator"
- "Counterfeit King"
- "Slot Scoundrel" – story of Tommy Carmichael
- "The Ultimate Cheat"
- "Vegas Vixen"
- "Beat The Wheel"
- "Slot Buster"
- "Professor Blackjack"
- "Prince of Poker"
