= Liza: A Truly Terrific Absolutely True Story =

2024 documentary film by Bruce David Klein

- Film poster
- Directed by: Bruce David Klein
- Produced by: Bruce David Klein; Alexander J. Goldstein; Robert Rich
- Edited by: Alexander J. Goldstein; Jake Keene
- Production company: Atlas Media
- Distributed by: Zeitgeist Films
- Release date: June 12, 2024 (Tribeca Festival)
- Running time: 104 minutes
- Country: United States
- Language: English
- Box office: $222,775

Liza: A Truly Terrific Absolutely True Story is a 2024 American documentary film produced and directed by Bruce David Klein about the life of Liza Minnelli. It premiered on June 12, 2024, at the Tribeca Festival to positive reviews.

The retrospective highlights the influence of Minnelli's collaborators Kay Thompson, Charles Aznavour, Bob Fosse, Fred Ebb, and Halston, in addition to the importance of her parents Judy Garland and Vincente Minnelli. The film also features interviews with Michael Feinstein, Joel Grey, Chita Rivera, and Ben Vereen, among others.

== Release ==
The film was released in New York City on January 24, 2025, and in Los Angeles on January 31, 2025. According to IndieWire: "Among limited runs, Liza: A Truly Terrific Absolutely True Story (Zeitgeist/Kino) with $19,000 at Manhattan's IFC Center had the best initial showing for a platformed documentary in some time. Liza Minnelli's fans and more turned out for what could be a niche success."

== Reception ==
On the review aggregator website Rotten Tomatoes, 91% of 43 critics' reviews are positive, with an average rating of 7.6/10. The website's consensus reads: "A doting recap of Liza Minnelli's accomplishments that unspools with an appropriately glitzy flair, this Truly Terrific Absolutely True Story is a worthy encapsulation of the icon's life and career." Metacritic, which uses a weighted average, assigned the film a score of 76 out of 100, based on 16 critics, indicating "generally favorable" reviews.

In his review for Variety, critic Owen Gleiberman called the film "scintillating". He wrote of a general sense of positivity despite overwhelming odds and remarked that Minnelli was "here to testify that she was not Judy Garland The Junior Wreck Edition." Elizabeth Weitzman of TheWrap heaped plenty of praise on director Klein, writing that he created a film "bursting with love". With that said, she did criticize Klein for leaving out Minnelli's childhood struggles despite the frequent discussions of vulnerability, calling it the "only real misstep" in what she otherwise considered "as close to the thrilling magic of one of Minnelli’s stage shows".

David Rooney of The Hollywood Reporter called the film "warmingly celebratory but also unquestionably authentic", suffused with a "generosity of spirit". However, he also wrote that there was a certain "selectivity", noticing that she did not speak much about her relationship problems or drug issues. Nevertheless, he advised Minnelli fans to "gather and worship." Manohla Dargis of The New York Times lauded the film as "jaw-dropping", "inspiring", and "determinedly upbeat". However, she also called it "conspicuously incomplete", noting that the film (understandably in her view) skimmed over the more troubled aspects of Minnelli's life, particularly her relationship with her mother.
