= History's Lost & Found =

- Starring: Edward Herrmann
- Country of origin: United States
- Original language: English
- No. of seasons: 4
- No. of episodes: 65 (list of episodes)

Production
- Executive producers: Susan Werbe & Bruce David Klein
- Running time: 30 or 60 minutes

Original release
- Network: History Channel
- Release: December 1998
- Release: August 7, 1999 – September 4, 2005

History's Lost and Found is a television show from the History Channel that debuted as a three-part series in December 1998. It first aired as a weekly series on August 7, 1999. Each episode is divided into different segments concerning a different "lost" item or artifact from history. Most of the time, the segments do not relate. Each segment runs around 7 minutes and in this time we learn the history of several famous lost artifacts such as the flags from the Battle of Iwo Jima, and other not-so-famous artifacts like the first TV tray table. Each segment ends with information on where this item is located. Some segments were reused in other episodes. Episodes of the show were released on VHS in 2001, and the first episode has been released on DVD. 2000 was the big year for the series as most of the episodes were created and aired during that year, but a few new episodes aired in 2004 and 2005. The final segment of each show is the "Auction Block" hosted by Karen Stone and featuring auction specialist Cameron Whiteman from the eBay auction house Butterfields where viewers can bid on a different historical item that they could own for themselves that changed from week to week. The featured item of the week was up for auction until 11:00 PM ET the following Thursday.

The series is based on the book "Lucy's Bones, Sacred Stones and Einstein's Brain" by Harvey Rachlin.

The series was produced by Atlas Media Corporation. Executive Producer: Bruce David Klein.

== Repeats ==
The History Channel continued to air the show in reruns every Sunday morning at 6:00 and 6:30 AM for many years.

The episodes do not air in order and some are shown more often than others.

== Episodes ==
The show originally ran in an hour format featuring six items in each episode. The segments were later edited into episodes of half an hour each featuring three items. These edited episodes are:

| Season | Episodes | Originally aired | | | DVD release dates |
| Season | Episodes | Season premiere | Season finale | Network | Region 1 |
|---|---|---|---|---|---|
| 1 | 3 | August 7, 1999 | September 11, 1999 | The History Channel | —N/a |
| 2 | 60 | October 6, 2000 | December 29, 2000 | The History Channel | —N/a |
| 3 | 2 | July 4, 2004 | July 21, 2004 | The History Channel | —N/a |
| 4 | 1 | September 4, 2005 | September 4, 2005 | The History Channel | —N/a |
