= Love Broker =

American television series

- Genre: Reality
- Starring: Lori Zaslow
- Country of origin: United States
- No. of seasons: 1
- No. of episodes: 8

Production
- Executive producers: Kevin Dill; Mechelle Collins
- Running time: 44 minutes
- Production company: Intuitive Entertainment

Original release
- Network: Bravo
- Release: March 5 – August 28, 2012

Love Broker is an American reality television series on Bravo. The series debuted on March 5, 2012 and follows Lori Zaslow as she creates love connections in New York City. On March 16, 2012, Bravo pulled the series from its broadcasting schedule due to low viewership. The series later returned on July 24, 2012.

== Episodes ==
No.	Title	Original release date	U.S. viewers (millions)
1	"David vs. Fish: How to Date Like a Man"	March 5, 2012	0.448
2	"Dana and Jesse: Getting Over an Ex and Insecurities in Dating"	March 12, 2012	0.444
3	"Jonathan Dickson and Jamie: Having Faith in Love"	July 24, 2012	0.523
4	"Quinn and David: Dating Is a Game, Love Is Not"	July 31, 2012	0.299
5	"Doug and Justin: Love at First Sight Is a Myth"	August 7, 2012	0.287
6	"Brendan and Marc: Love Is No Joke"	August 14, 2012	N/A
7	"Pele and Brendan: Growing Up for Love"	August 21, 2012	N/A
8	"Ben: Nothing Is Perfect in Love"	August 28, 2012	N/A
