= Evacuate Earth =

- Genre: Futurism
- Written by: Bill McClane
- Directed by: Ted Schillinger
- Country of origin: United States
- Original language: English
- No. of episodes: 7

Production
- Executive producer: Bruce David Klein
- Producer: Bill McClane
- Cinematography: Vitaly Bokser
- Editors: Will Gardiner; Jake Keene
- Camera setup: Single-camera setup
- Running time: 90 minutes 60 minutes (for 6 episodes Only)
- Production company: Atlas Media Corp.

Original release
- Network: National Geographic Channel
- Release: December 2, 2012 – March 10, 2014

Evacuate Earth is a National Geographic Channel documentary that portrays the hypothetical scenario of humans evacuating the planet Earth before it is destroyed by a rogue neutron star. The documentary details the technical and social complications of building a generation ship to save humanity and other Earth organisms by relocating to a planet in another solar system.

== Premise ==
The documentary proposes a thought experiment in which a neutron star approaches Earth. Constant meteor storms are the first warning sign, and dramatic sequences depict widespread destruction and the deaths of thousands of people. Given 75 years to prepare, human society radically shifts toward the evacuation of Earth. The propulsion system for the spacecraft is the first problem to be addressed. The world's leading experts debate the benefits and drawbacks of various methods. Conventional rockets are too slow, and antimatter engines are too unstable; they eventually settle on nuclear pulse propulsion, as originally suggested by Project Orion.

The world's engineers, scientists, and manufacturing workers begin work at a new site in Florida, dubbed Starship City. Interviewed experts propose that fatalism may drive some people either to suicide or radicalism and attempts to sabotage the project. Eventually, terrorists strike the facility, though they are destroyed by a hidden minefield. Brush fire conflicts also escalate, as security forces are focused on either maintaining order or protecting the interstellar project's facilities and personnel.

Who is to be evacuated is another major issue. Although diversity is respected, any selected individual would have to be genetically hardy and not predisposed toward disease (such as schizophrenia and diabetes). A second ark ship is announced amid controversy, as it is reserved for the world's wealthiest and most powerful families willing to pay for passage. Simulated newscasts announce delays and setbacks as scientists are lured to the private ark ship. As the neutron star enters the Solar System, Saturn is destroyed, and the Earth experiences calamitous shifts in its seasons and bursts of radiation leading to fatalities and ecological damage. The private ark ship, equipped with an antimatter engine, explodes when its antimatter containment fails. Families are potentially broken up as they prepare to board the remaining ark ship, and experts discuss the basic necessities for human life: bacteria, air, water, and food. Bacteria are easily stored, and air is synthesized from water. Food, however, remains a difficult problem, and experts propose that colonists will eat insects and algae, which are easily replenished and space efficient. They also propose that the oxygen and water produced by agriculture, trees, grass and other plant life will produce its own weather and biosphere about 60–80 years into the ship's journey.

The ark ship launches and quickly speeds away, a few days later the neutron star is close enough that its tidal force begins to deform the Earth's core and the crust, which causes massive earthquakes and volcanism. Next, the gravity from the neutron star tears away the surface, causing the crust to shatter and the hot interior of Earth to spill out into the vacuum of space, destroying the Earth, but only the colonists on the ark can witness this event, as the rest of humanity had already been wiped out. The colonists continue their journey to Barnard's Star; experts discuss the potential for mutiny and factionalism, ultimately rejecting them as unlikely, as strong family and societal bonds will be emphasized. The journey is estimated to take approximately 88 years, and the youngest of the original crew survive to see the new planet, which potentially harbors other lifeforms. Experts conclude that the scenario, though unlikely, is possible and requires preparation from the world's governments.

== Cast ==
- Catherine Asaro
- David Bartell
- Matt Ganey
- Terri Ganey
- Les Johnson
- Paul Levinson
- Hakeem Oluseyi
- Fernando I. Rivera
- Heather Gautney

== Reception ==
Mike Hale of The New York Times wrote, "It’s essentially science fiction, cheap and cheesy, with lots of stock scenes of explosions, fires and chaotic crowds, but it’s consistently interesting."

== See also ==
- Gorath, a Japanese film based on what scientists believe to be a compact star on a collision course with Earth
- When Worlds Collide, a 1951 film with a similar premise
