= It Could Happen Tomorrow =

- Genre: Documentary
- Created by: Jim Cantore
- Country of origin: United States
- Original language: English
- No. of episodes: 33

Production
- Executive producer: Bruce David Klein
- Running time: 30 minutes
- Production company: Atlas Media Corp.

Original release
- Network: The Weather Channel
- Release: January 15, 2006 – July 29, 2007

It Could Happen Tomorrow is a television series that premiered on January 15, 2006 on The Weather Channel. It explored the possibilities of various weather and other natural phenomena severely damaging or destroying America's cities. This included: a Category 3 hurricane hitting New York City, an F4 tornado destroying Washington, D.C., dormant volcano Mount Rainier re-activating and destroying towns in the surrounding valleys, a tsunami flooding the Pacific Northwest coast, an intraplate earthquake impacting Memphis, Tennessee, wildfires spreading into the heart of San Diego, a huge earthquake leveling San Francisco, a flash flood in Boulder, Colorado, and a flood in Sacramento. More recent episodes included an earthquake in Las Vegas, an F5 tornado ripping its way through Chicago and Dallas, and more.

As of 2024, the only scenario that had come true is the Colorado floods, which started on September 9, 2013. Because Hurricane Sandy was only a category 1 and not a 3 when New York was hit, the first episode hadn't technically come true, although Sandy was the closest call since the series ended

In 2024, the Tampa Bay Area was hit by Hurricane Milton, fulfilling the show’s prediction of a major hurricane impacting the Tampa Bay Area. In January 2025, a destructive wildfire struck the Los Angeles area. This also fulfilled the show’s prediction of a wildfire hitting Los Angeles.

== Plot ==
Each episode was broken into several segments: "It Did Happen", a segment that talked about similar disasters happening in other parts of America (or even earlier in the target city featured); "When It Happens/How It Would Happen", which talked about how the disaster would unfold; and a third segment about how to prepare for the disaster, and interviews with residents in the threatened areas about what they think of the disaster threat. Sometimes there is a segment called "Before It Happens", which shows what is being done to prepare for the disaster.

== Production ==
"It Could Happen Tomorrow" was produced by Atlas Media Corporation. The program's executive producer was Bruce David Klein and supervising producer was Cheryl Houser.

== Episodes ==
=== Season 1: 2006 ===
No.	Title	Original release date
1	"New York City Hurricane Express"	January 15, 2006
A category 3 hurricane is headed for New York City, what catastrophic damage would this cause? Examine the very real possibilities of this devastating act of nature. Based on the 1938 New England hurricane.
2	"Dallas Tornado Danger"	January 23, 2006
A massive supercell has given birth to an F5 tornado and it is headed straight for Dallas, Texas. Get a look at what if anything will be left standing once mother nature unleashes this beast. Based on the 1999 Oklahoma tornado outbreak.
3	"Living in Mount Rainier's Shadow"	January 30, 2006
Beautiful Mount Rainier in Washington is the home of a potential disaster. Located inside Mount Rainier National Park, the devastation from an eruption could be catastrophic. Based on the 1980 eruption of Mount St. Helens.
4	"West Coast Tsunami"	February 27, 2006
A massive earthquake hits off the coast of Seattle. The Tsunami that would follow would cause catastrophic damage to the entire west coast of the United States and beyond. Based on the 1700 Cascadia earthquake, 1964 Alaska earthquake and the 2004 Indian Ocean earthquake and tsunami.
5	"New Madrid Fault"	March 13, 2006
The New Madrid Fault has been in hibernation since the early 1800s. If a massive earthquake was to start, the effects would be deadly. Near by Memphis, Tennessee would suffer a terrible loss of life and property. Based on the 1811-1812 New Madrid earthquakes (traditionally) and the 1994 Northridge earthquake (modern).
6	"Sacramento Floods"	March 20, 2006
The streets of Sacramento, California are filling with water. With nowhere for the water to go, what damage will be left behind? Based on the Great Flood of 1862 (traditionally) and Hurricane Katrina (modern).
7	"California Wildfires"	March 27, 2006
A small fire starts in California, before personnel know it is raging and consuming thousands of acres. Where could it go if firefighters are unable to contain it? Based on Cedar Fire in San Diego.
8	"San Francisco 8.0 Earthquake"	April 10, 2006
San Francisco, California, the earth starts to move under everyone’s feet. A massive earthquake measuring 8.0 on the Richter Scale has just occurred. What devastating effects will this have on the city and the powerful aftershocks that follow? Based on the 1906 San Francisco earthquake.
9	"Colorado Flash Floods"	April 17, 2006
Heavy rain fall in Boulder, Colorado has resulted in flash flooding. Massive amounts of damage and loss of property and life will result when and if mother nature unleashes water on the city. Based on the floods of 1844 (traditionally) and the 1965 Denver floods.
10	"Katrina"	June 5, 2006
Hurricane Katrina slammed into the Gulf Coast in August 2005. The catastrophic damage is outlined as well as what is being done to prevent another disaster. Hosted by Jim Cantore. †

†Hour long special, see Katrina episode section below

=== Season 2: 2007 ===
No. overall	No. in season	Title	Original release date
11	1	"Chicago Tornado"	January 7, 2007
12	2	"Houston Hurricane"	January 7, 2007
13	3	"St. Louis Tornado"	January 21, 2007
14	4	"Hawaii Tsunami"	January 21, 2007
15	5	"Seattle Earthquake"	January 28, 2007
16	6	"Texas Wildfire"	January 28, 2007
17	7	"Las Vegas Earthquake"	February 11, 2007
18	8	"Washington D.C. Tornado"	March 11, 2007
19	9	"Miami Hurricane"	June 3, 2007
20	10	"Savannah Hurricane"	June 10, 2007
21	11	"Charleston Earthquake"	July 1, 2007
22	12	"Los Angeles Fire"	July 8, 2007
23	13	"Tampa Hurricane"	July 29, 2007

== Katrina episode ==
Coincidentally, the original Category 5 hurricane episode was to involve New Orleans. It was conceived and scripted months before Hurricane Katrina ever struck New Orleans. After Katrina, the debut episode was changed to instead show such a storm striking New York City (reducing the storm to a Category 3, as it is believed that is the strongest such storm that would strike the city; such a storm in 1938 missed New York City by just 75 miles, and historical records also show that a similar storm directly hit the city in 1821). On June 4, 2006, The Weather Channel aired this episode, titled "Katrina: The Lost Episode." Unlike most episodes, this episode was one hour in length and combined clips of the "lost" episode with a Storm Stories-style retelling of Katrina's effects.

== Schedule ==
It Could Happen Tomorrow continued running on TWC until April 2010, when The Weather Channel began airing many other new weather shows; it was replaced by Storm Stories and Full Force Nature. On March 12, 2011, It Could Happen Tomorrow was brought back to the schedule. As of July 2013, two episodes aired Fridays at 4–5 pm, but as of October 2013, it is no longer on TWC's schedule.

== See also ==
- Perfect Disaster - a similar television show
- Mega Disasters - another worst-case scenario series on History Channel
