= Stalked: Someone's Watching =

American TV documentary series (2011–2014)

- Genre: Documentary
- Presented by: Michelle Ward
- Country of origin: United States
- No. of seasons: 4
- No. of episodes: 58

Production
- Executive producers: Bruce David Klein; Diana Sperrazza; Lorri Leighton
- Running time: 20 to 24 minutes (excluding commercials)
- Production company: Atlas Media Corporation

Original release
- Network: Investigation Discovery
- Release: January 24, 2011 – April 7, 2014

Stalked: Someone's Watching (also stylized as Stalked) is an American television documentary series on Investigation Discovery that debuted on January 24, 2011. The series tells the stories of those who have been stalked and is hosted by Michelle Ward. Stalked: Someone's Watching ran for four seasons, ending in 2014.

In 2021, a related update of the series, Stalked: Followed By Fear, aired for a single season.

== Premise ==
The show chronicles numerous cases—four seasons’ worth—of stalkers and their victims. The stories are told through reenactments with actor portrayals which give viewers a better picture of what exactly happened. Woven throughout each episode are interviews with various people involved in each individual case, which break up the monotony of the reenactments. Interviewees range from the victim's family, friends, colleagues, and, of course, the victims themselves. In addition to the interviews of the aforementioned who have experienced the ordeals is Michelle Ward, the host of the show.

== The host ==
Michelle Ward attended both the University of Colorado and the University of Southern California and has earned a PhD in Psychology with a focus in Clinical Neuroscience and Behavioral Genetics. Being a victim of stalking herself, Michelle Ward has studied predatory criminals and the judicial system for over ten years. She has worked in many different areas of study within the span of her continuing career. At the start of her career, she worked studying criminals, of which she separated them into two categories (impulsive-type and predatory-type). The latter would be characteristic of stalkers, which later became Ward's main focus. In addition to her early work and later studies in genetic and biological characteristics of twins, Michelle has published several articles regarding psychology and complex human behavior.

During each episode, Ward offers input at various points in the reenactments in order to explain the stalker's behaviors, their patterns, and some theories on stalking at work.

== Examples of episodes ==
Episodes cover a wide range of stories. In one episode, a police officer named Amy and her husband get married, but not long into their relationship, the husband's behavior changes dramatically. His emotions become a roller coaster, ranging from extreme sadness to rage. He insults her and scolds over every detail. He tries to exert control over every aspect of Amy's life, down to how she styled her hair. Michelle Ward describes these outbursts of the husband as a demonstration of his lack of control. When she leaves, the intense stalking begins.

Another example comes from the story of a woman named Peggy. She was pursuing a career in the medical field and moved to Albuquerque, New Mexico to do so. Once there, Peggy meets a man named Patrick and the two connect instantly. After only a few weeks, the pace of the relationship picked up greatly at the hand of Patrick, which Michelle Ward identifies as a means of controlling the relationship. Emotional abuse sets in and after three years, Peggy leaves. Patrick, enraged at his loss of control, hunts her down and eventually kills her before taking his own life.

Another episode offers a more disturbing view of stalking. A woman named Mary moves to a small suburb in Washington, D.C., with her family. She meets her neighbor, Jane and soon after, her life falls apart. Jane becomes obsessed with her and imitates her every move. She begins to dress in the same clothes as Mary and dyed her hair to match her new “best friend.” Realizing this, Mary ignores Jane which proves to be dangerous. Jane begins to accuse Mary of anything and everything to cause pain. Michelle Ward comments that many stalkers use the façade of being a victim themselves. Mary and her family are forced to move and the stalking comes to an end.

== Media coverage of stalking ==
With the emergence of new technologies, stalking has been made easier via texts, GPS, social networking sites, and more. This type of stalking has been dubbed cyberstalking, and although the use of technology by predators is relatively new, the act of stalking is not a new phenomenon as many people believe. It dates back almost 200 years, seen through artwork, news reports, films, etc.

With the emergence of technology and social media, stalking does receive more extensive coverage by media outlets; therefore, the topic has been made more familiar to the public. One famous case of celebrity stalking occurred when a woman named Genevieve Sabourin was arrested for stalking Alec Baldwin. Like the many stories depicted in Stalked, Sabourin waited at Baldwin's house, called him excessively, and made it seem as though the two were lovers. Another recent example involving non-celebrities which made headlines involved a man named James Jones was arrested for stalking his former professor at Alabama College. Jones went to extreme means, and his stalking led to aggravated assault. He opened fire on the woman's house but she remained unharmed.

== Episodes ==
=== Season 1 (2011) ===
No. in season	Title	Original release date
1	"Nowhere to Run"	January 24, 2011
After three years of emotional abuse, 28-year-old Peggy Klinke breaks it off with boyfriend Patrick Kennedy. When Patrick begins watching Peggy's every move, police offer little to no help, leaving Peggy to take matters into her own hands.
2	"Neighborhood Watch"	January 31, 2011
When "Mary" moves to a quiet DC suburb she finds a new best friend in her next-door neighbor Jane. But before long it's clear that there's something strange about Jane. Uncomfortable, Mary tries to distance herself but Jane won't be stopped.
3	"Too Close to Home"	February 7, 2011
When single mother of two, Harvette Williams, gives her business card to Kevin Gary, she has no idea that she's inviting an obsessive stalker into her life. Dr. Michelle Ward looks at what happens when a harmless crush turns into a dangerous obsession.
4	"Behind the Shield"	February 14, 2011
Police officer Amy Johnson is happily married to Dustin Hall for six years when in the blink of an eye, he becomes a different man. As a cop, Amy is convinced she can handle it on her own until Dustin finally goes too far.
5	"Dangerous Games"	February 21, 2011
Single mother Karen Welch gets a mysterious call on Christmas Eve. At first, she thinks nothing of it, but before long, she's getting dozens of hang-up calls every day. Follow Dr. Michelle Ward through this shocking game of cat and mouse.
6	"Teenage Obsession"	February 28, 2011
In 1996, outgoing Cameron Wallace meets shy Ryan Clutter in a high school art class. The two are only acquaintances but Ryan soon becomes obsessed with her. And little does she know that Ryan will stalk her for the next ten years.

=== Season 2 (2011–2012) ===
No. in season	Title	Original release date
1	"Dire Straits"	December 5, 2011
A college student in Staten Island meets a deceivingly charming man. He sweeps her off her feet but the relationship turns sour when his true nature is revealed. Michelle Ward explains the psyche of a man who knows no fear and creates the ultimate terror.
2	"Signed, Your Deadliest Fan"	December 12, 2011
Colleen Doran, a successful comic book author and illustrator, encounters a fan who wants far more than an autograph. Follow Dr. Michelle Ward as she journeys to find out what happens when a fan's admiration turns into a sick obsession.
3	"Six Degrees of Separation"	December 19, 2011
A bright and free-spirited college graduate lands a job as a high-tech investigator and strikes up a relationship with her superior. When he becomes abusive, her attempts to escape prove to be no match for the highly trained investigator turned stalker.
4	"Love Is A Battlefield"	December 26, 2011
A young nurse falls in love and marries the man of her dreams; but before long her husband becomes violent and controlling. Follow Dr. Michelle Ward as she journeys to find out what happens when the man of your dreams turns out to be an endless nightmare.
5	"In The Spotlight"	January 12, 2012
Arthel Neville, a well-respected TV news journalist in San Diego, is stalked by a deranged fan who threatens rape and murder if she doesn't follow explicit instructions while on air. Follow Dr. Michelle Ward along the dangerous path of a journalist's life in the spotlight.
6	"Deadly Envy"	January 12, 2012
An aspiring Hollywood actress is reacquainted with an old friend and fellow actress who becomes deeply jealous of her beauty and success. Follow Dr. Michelle Ward as she tracks what happens when an envious friend becomes a dangerous enemy.
7	"Out of Bounds"	January 19, 2012
A friendly nurse offers odd jobs to a struggling man who quickly becomes infatuated. Despite her rejections to his advances, the married man becomes more aggressive and will not take "no" for an answer. Will she pay the ultimate price for her kindness?
8	"Burning Desire."	January 19, 2012
Alberto Benitez is a successful police instructor in Kingsville, Texas. When he breaks up with his girlfriend, her obsession turns his life into a vicious game of survival.
9	"Badlands"	January 26, 2012
Marie DePalma, a shy middle school student in Detroit, MI, is thrilled when an older student takes an interest in her. As their relationship develops, her life turns into a living hell.
10	"The Girl Next Door"	January 26, 2012
A kind-hearted fifth grader befriends the strange girl down the block. Little does she know that her good intentions will have life-altering consequences. Dr. Michelle Ward explores what happens when child's play becomes dangerous.
11	"Above the Law"	February 2, 2012
Vicki Kuper, a recent divorcee, lives in Iowa with her four children. She eventually finds new love with Jack, but his jealous tendencies soon rise to the surface. Vicki struggles to escape his controlling grasp in this small town nightmare.
12	"Off the Deep End"	February 9, 2012
Sheila Taormina, an Olympic gold medalist and world-class tri-athlete, finds herself receiving strange phone calls and letters from a fellow athlete. Before long he is following her to competitions around the country and police can do nothing to stop him.
13	"Web of Destruction"	February 16, 2012
Mai Hlee Xiong is a beauty pageant contestant fresh out of college. A stalker is watching her every move and he'll stop at nothing to defame her good reputation.
14	"Kiss of Death."	February 23, 2012
Lee Redmond has a beautiful wife, a healthy baby girl, and just won his first title as a heavyweight kickboxer. When Lee helps a woman in need, he finds himself the object of what could soon become a fatal attraction.
15	"Power Play"	March 1, 2012
Jane Haag, a successful software consultant in Orange County, CA rarely has time to date. That changes when she meets Ron. They quickly fall in love and move in together. Jane discovers later that Ron is a virtual time bomb about to explode.
16	"Evil Intent."	March 8, 2012
Andrew Bagby, a Canadian medical student, starts dating fellow student Shirley Turner but doesn't want a serious relationship. After graduation, Andrew accepts a job in the U.S. and break things off. Shirley isn't ready to let him go.

=== Season 3 (2012–2013) ===
No. in season	Title	Original release date
1	"The Bogeyman"	December 12, 2012
Sherry Meinberg lives the innocent life of an American teen growing up in 1950s California and when she meets handsome Chuck Gray, she's over the moon. But the moment they are married, he turns into a monster. After three years of physical and psychological abuse Sherry escapes the marriage, but Chuck's got no intentions of letting her go. Even when he's in prison for other violent crimes against women, he threatens that one day he'll be back. Little does Sherry know that Chuck's deadly obsession will last a lifetime. Join Dr. Michelle Ward as she follows the longest stalking case in U.S. history.
2	"Prisoner of Love"	December 12, 2012
Katerina Brunot is a beautiful young Russian woman who thinks she's met the man of her dreams in an American tourist, Frank Sheridan. But when they move back to the U.S. to get married, her dream soon turns into a brutal nightmare. After he turns her into a domestic slave - forcing her to cook, clean, and have sex against her will - she attempts to flee back home to Russia. But Frank won't have any of it, and frames her for a violent crime that she didn't commit. Katerina proves her innocence, but after he relentlessly stalks her, she realizes that Frank will never leave her alone until she's dead. Can Katerina ever escape the clutches of her deranged husband? Follow Dr. Michelle Ward as she traces the path of maniacal deception and deadly obsession.
3	"Nightmare Next Door"	December 19, 2012
When 13-year-old Jessie Cooper meets 34-year-old Nick Hamilton, she thinks he's just a nice next-door neighbor. But when he starts writing Jessie love letters, her mother discovers they have a serious problem on their hands. Nick is a registered sex offender with a penchant for adolescent girls and he is relentlessly pursuing Jessie. He's put behind bars for stalking Jessie, but a few years in prison only fuels his infatuation. Now he's about to be released and Jessie fears he'll not only be back for her, but this time he's out for revenge. Join Dr. Michelle Ward as she finds out what happens when nothing will stop a twisted obsession.
4	"Campaign of Terror"	December 19, 2012
Bob Krueger and his wife Kathleen are devastated when Bob loses a close race for a U.S. Senate seat - but nothing could prepare the political power couple for the reign of terror that their former campaign pilot, Tom Humphrey, would unleash on them. Tom's obsession for the Kruegers leads him to move in right across the street so he can watch their every move. When Bob demands that he move away, he threatens to destroy their home - and their lives. Can Bob and Kathleen outsmart Tom long enough to stay alive and help the FBI trap him? Join Dr. Michelle Ward as she explores what happens when a life in the political spotlight attracts a life-threatening obsession.
5	"Haunting Obsession"	December 26, 2012
Friendly eighth grader Tracy Lundeen thinks she's doing a good deed by offering to help the school outcast, Shawn Moul, with his homework. But when Tracy politely turns down his request for a date, her life becomes a living hell. For the next 17 years, Shawn stalks her relentlessly and nothing will stop him- not expulsion from school or even jail. Tracy and her family go into hiding, but when Shawn is released from prison, he is hell-bent on finding Tracy. Will Tracy be able to keep her whereabouts a secret from her former classmate, or will his twisted obsession endanger her and her entire family? Join Dr. Michelle Ward as she explores what happens when an adolescent crush turns into a never-ending nightmare.
6	"Idol Worship"	January 2, 2013
Jessica Sierra is an aspiring singer who earns a spot on the hit TV show, American Idol. Soon after, a man named Daniel Young calls her claiming to be a music producer, but soon it's clear he's interested in more than just her voice. Daniel starts stalking her relentlessly, telling her they are meant to be together. And to Jessica's horror, he finds out where her family lives and that he's on his way there to find her. Can Jessica protect herself and her family even though she doesn't know what her stalker looks like? Join Dr. Michelle Ward as she discovers just how far one obsessed fan is willing to go.
7	"Fear F.M."	January 9, 2013
K.T. Mills is a popular radio DJ with a friendly voice. But when one deranged listener becomes obsessed with the woman behind the mic, her life is turned upside down. K.T. soon learns that her fan has a gun - and he's hell-bent on making her his own.
8	"Stalked.com"	January 16, 2013
When 18-year-old college freshmen Kristen Pratt gets a Facebook friend request from an old high school classmate named Patrick Macchione, she thinks nothing of accepting it. But she soon finds that she has opened the door to a maniac. Patrick bombards her day and night with messages, each one more bizarre and disturbing than the last. Soon he starts posting videos of himself to YouTube, demanding that she live with him and have his baby... or else. Will Kristen be able to outsmart her cyberstalker before he kills her? Join Dr. Michelle Ward as she discovers how social media can lead to a twisted obsession.
9	"Devil in Disguise"	January 16, 2013
Sandi Musk is a successful businesswoman, but her life is too busy to look for Mr. Right. Then she meets Andy Lefleur, a young, good-looking man who's head over heels for Sandi. When she starts to see he has a violent streak, she breaks it off, but he's not taking no for an answer. He relentlessly pursues her at home and work. When he goes off the rails, Sandi finds herself at the mercy of a vicious sadist, and she is in for the fight of a lifetime. Will Sandi survive an all out attack? Join Dr. Michelle Ward as she finds out what happens when an obsession turns savage.
10	"She-Devil."	January 23, 2013
Tom Donato is a military man looking for love when he meets smart and successful Kristin Williams. Soon they get married and have a baby girl, but when Tom gives up his job to be a stay-at-home dad, Kristin starts to control his every move. Finally Tom demands a divorce, but he has no idea that Kristin will exact a terrible price for revenge: She frames him as a violent stalker. Will Tom find a way to clear his name before he's locked up for life? Join Dr. Michelle Ward as she examines what happens when a scorned woman turns the tables on an innocent man.
11	"Hell Hath No Fury."	January 23, 2013
After a painful divorce, George Long vows never to marry again, so when he meets Cheryl Vivier, he thinks he's found the perfect woman -- she has no interest in marriage either. Or so he thinks. Suddenly after 11 happy years together, Cheryl demands they get married. When George breaks off the relationship, she flies off the handle and begins stalking him day and night, repeatedly showing up on his property. When suicide threats don't bring George back to her, she threatens his life instead. Can George escape his scorned ex-girlfriend? Join Dr. Michelle Ward as she follows one desperate woman all the way to the bitter end.
12	"Toxic Love"	January 30, 2013
Robin is a friendly waitress who catches the eye of a handsome customer. But after they begin a relationship, his twisted need for control bubbles to the surface. Now, Robin must find a way to escape a boyfriend who is hell-bent on destroying her.
13	"Good Vs Evil"	February 6, 2013
18-year-old college student Jennifer Paulson feels sorry for loner Jed Waits. But Jed develops an instant crush on Jennifer, and when she gently rejects his advances, he erupts in a shocking fury. Years after graduation, he contacts her again out of the blue, picking up right where he left off. From then on his obsession will defy all expectations and leave Jennifer guessing where her stalker will strike next. Will she be able to escape the explosive rage of her unpredictable stalker before it's too late? Join Dr. Michelle Ward as she follows the destructive path of one man who refuses to let go.
14	"Wolf in Sheep's Clothing"	February 13, 2013
Judy Phillips is a kind, middle-aged woman recovering from a debilitating kidney disease. When James Cain, a handsome younger man, takes a liking to her, she is more than flattered. But Prince Charming quickly reveals his heart of darkness when he becomes verbally abusive and cruel. When Judy finally ends the relationship after a year and a half of psychological torture, it sets off a relentless campaign of stalking. Judy and her daughter Trisha band together to put him behind bars, but unbeknownst to them, James is hatching a deadly plan for revenge. Join Dr. Michelle Ward as she sees what happens when an unlikely romance turns into sheer evil.
15	"The Madonna Stalker"	February 20, 2013
In early 1995, music superstar Madonna is at the top of her game. But one deranged fan will stop at nothing to be with her, even if it means going as far as to tell her guard that she's his wife, or killing her. After her property is violated, Madonna must find a way to escape from her delusional fan before it's too late.
16	"If I Can't Have You"	February 20, 2013
This episode is based on 17-year-old Kaitlyn Sudberry's first dating relationship that ended in the worst imaginable way. Kaity's law in this episode refers to a Law in Arizona in honor of Kaitlyn Marie Sudberry. This law provides protection for those in dating relationships by expanding the relationship guidelines of the Arizona Revised Statue 13-3601 to include those in dating relationships of a romantic or sexual nature.

=== Season 4 (2013–2014) ===
No. in season	Title	Original release date
1	"Twist of Hate"	December 9, 2013
Dawn Hillyer is a busy single mother when she dates whip-smart Mike McClellan. When Dawn's ready to move on, Mike's unwilling to let go. He begins a vicious campaign of stalking, online and off, threatening her reputation and even her life. This episode stars Jovanni Ortiz.
2	"Cruel Intentions"	December 9, 2013
Student Christen Naujoks thinks she's met her college sweetheart in John Peck. But when he reveals his cruel nature, she breaks things off. Then a newspaper article exposes his dark past, and John stops at nothing to get revenge.
3	"Playing with Fire"	December 16, 2013
After Vernetta Cockerham kicks her abusive ex, Richard Ellerbee, out of the house, he stalks her with deadly intent. Police won't help, so when Richard threatens murder, Vernetta must face the fight of her life -- alone.
4	"Off the Rail"	December 16, 2013
When train engineer Dinah Lynch rejects the advances of her coworker, Stanley Decker launches a crusade to punish her at all costs. With no help from police Dinah's left to fend for herself, and stalking soon becomes a matter of life or death.
5	"In The Puppet Master"	December 23, 2013
In 1981 New York, college student Deborah becomes pregnant with Steven Brown's child. Not expecting her boyfriend's involvement, she is pleased when he proposes marriage. It is not long, though, until the honeymoon is over. Brown proves an abusive predator, which only worsens when the child is born. Soon, Deborah finds herself suffering from Battered-Wives-Syndrome. Finally escaping after 17 years, children in tow, Deborah finds refuge. But it was not long before Steven finds Deborah. It will take the senseless murders of two innocent people before Deborah's nightmare seems to head toward an end. In a bizarre twist of fate, though, will true justice ever be served?
6	"Cat and Mouse"	December 30, 2013
Married young, Deborah Roberts becomes a slave to her husband's daily abuse; when she finds the courage to leave, he will stop at nothing to get revenge.
7	"Married to Madness"	January 6, 2014
Susan Zarriello thought her abusive ex-husband, David Richards, was nothing more than a bad memory. But when he unleashes a sadistic torrent of cyber attacks 15 years after their divorce, Susan realizes he's been watching the whole time.
8	"Predator by Proxy"	January 13, 2014
After Angell Williams kicks her cheating ex Michael out of the house, he returns for revenge. He's briefly jailed after assaulting her, so he turns to the web. His fake sex ads send other men right to her door to act out Michael's own sick fantasies.
9	"Without a Trace"	January 20, 2014
When Pam Dunn finally breaks free from her abusive relationship with Dave Asmussen, things go from bad to worse as Dave relentlessly stalks and threatens her. Too afraid to ask for help, Pam must fend for herself against her merciless ex.
10	"The Ties that Bind"	January 27, 2014
Kathy Haley's thrilled when her handsome older husband David treats her like a prized possession - until he beats her down with insults and abuse. Finally Kathy escapes her prison of a marriage, but David's not about to let her go.
11	"Addicted to Rage"	February 3, 2014
Nurse Katie Socci stands by her tall, handsome fiancé David McNamara, even after he's charged with stealing narcotics. But once she finally throws him out for sleeping with other women, he unleashes the deadly fury of a stalker scorned.
12	"S&M Sex & Malice"	February 10, 2014
After Ann Moulds is bombarded with sadistic letters from an anonymous stalker, she tries to get help from police. But with no stalking laws in Scotland, she's at his mercy. When she learns the secret of his identity, it turns her world upside down.
13	"Gamble with Death"	February 17, 2014
Donna Eskew calls off her romance with Glen Johnson after he tries to take it to the next level. But he won't give up. When he corners Donna in a casino parking lot with a chilling threat, she'll have to use all her wits to stay alive.
14	"Hopelessly Devoted"	February 24, 2014
Kaia Anderson is kind to fellow student Robert Vinyard. She never imagines it will lead to a lifelong delusional obsession that won't be stopped by reason or the law. When his fantasies grow dark, Kaia has to take matters into her own hands.
15	"Stealth Stalker"	March 3, 2014
When Terri Mendez breaks up with Jose Moreno, he pretends to move on. Little does she know, he's watching every move she makes. When discovers hidden cameras in her bedroom, she realizes there's nowhere to hide.
16	"A Virtual Nightmare"	March 10, 2014
Up and coming pop star Elle Richardson is bombarded with threatening emails from a stranger hell-bent on destroying her career and ruining her life. But Elle is determined to track down her faceless stalker first.
17	"A Mother's Nightmare"	March 17, 2014
When Jessica Lenahan takes out a restraining order against her dangerous ex-husband, he vows to get her back. When police won't protect her, Jessica is left to face one night of unimaginable horror that will change her life forever.
18	"Death Spiral"	March 23, 2014
Linda Smith is hoping for love when she meets wealthy and handsome Jim McDonald. But Jim's charm lasts only as long as he doesn't drink. Unable to stay sober, Jim becomes determined to keep Linda all to himself, even if it kills her.
19	"Collateral Damage"	March 31, 2014
Air Force sergeant Rachel Wilson's marriage falls apart when husband Darrell starts hiring hookers. But he erupts in rage when he learns Rachel's met the perfect man, a smarter, better-looking athlete. Now, more than just Rachel's life is at stake.
20	"Date with the Devil."	April 7, 2014
When Ron Ruse breaks up with his controlling girlfriend, Linda Ricchio, she vows to get him back at any cost. Soon demands turn to death threats and Ron goes on the run. But he'll quickly discover there's no escape from a fatal attraction.
