= Candice Kumai =

American author and chef

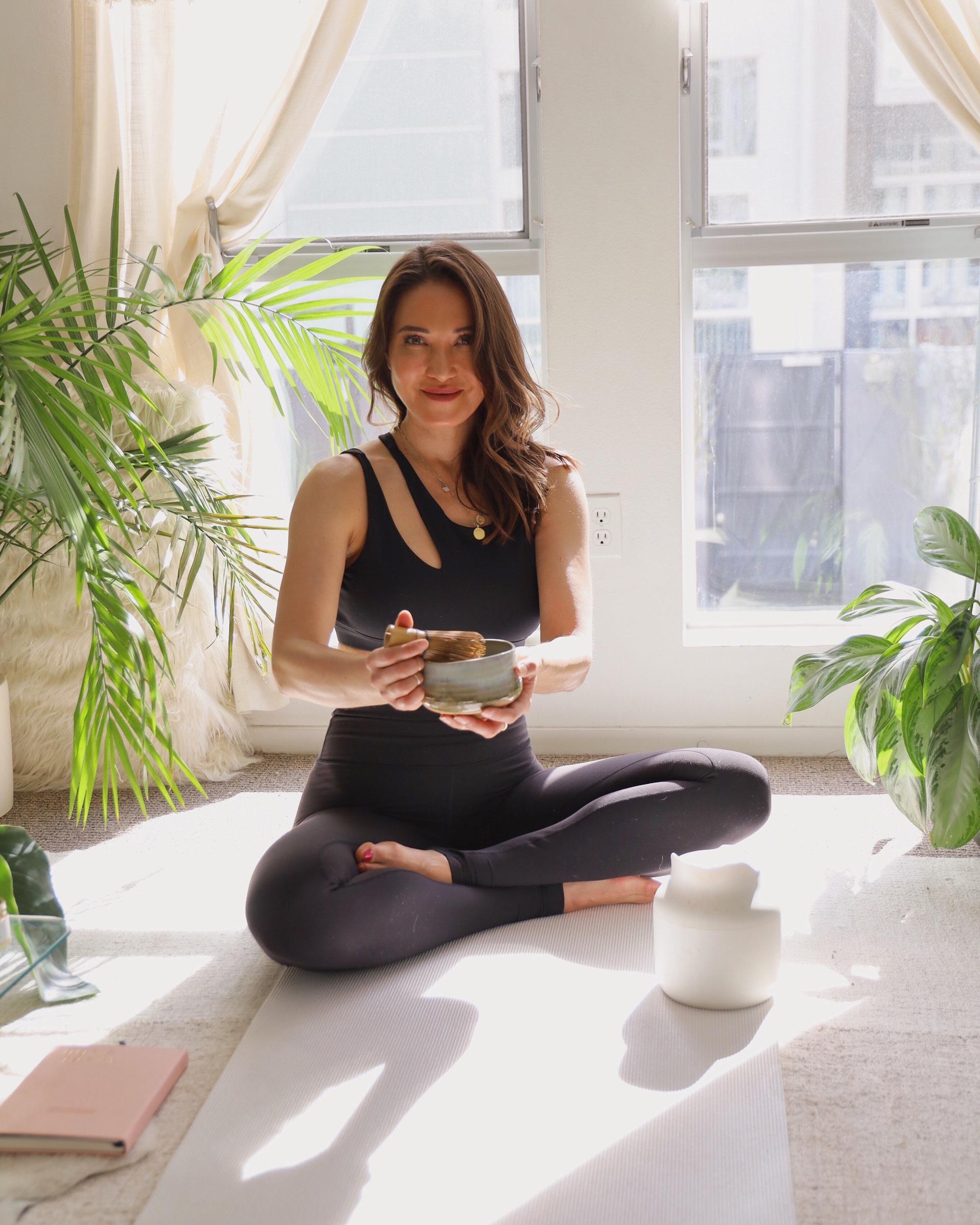
- Born: California
- Occupations: Author and chef
- Website: candicekumai.com

Candice Kumai is an American author and chef. Kumai is based in New York City.

== Early life and education ==
Kumai was born in California to a Japanese mother and Polish-American father. She has one sister. She worked as a model as a teenager. Later, she trained as a professional chef in Southern California, cooking on the line at several restaurants.

== Career ==
In 2006, Kumai was the youngest chef competing on the first season of Top Chef. She was the fourth chef eliminated from the competition.

Her approach to cooking is based on her Japanese American heritage. Kumai became the host for Lifetime's show, Cook Yourself Thin.

Kumai has been involved in 1,000 Days, which is an initiative started by Hillary Clinton in 2010 to improve nutrition for mothers and children worldwide. In 2014, she became a Kirin brand ambassador.

Her series of books in the Clean Green series have made the bestseller list of the New York Times. Kumai is also a contributing editor to Shape Magazine.

== Education ==
Kumai is a graduate of California State University, Long Beach where she studied interpersonal and organizational communications.

== Books ==
Year	Title	Notes
2009	Cook Yourself Thin	Co-author
2011	Pretty Delicious	Author
2012	Cook Yourself Sexy	Author
2014	Clean Green Drinks	Author
2015	Clean Green Eats	Author
2018	Kintsugi Wellness	Author

== Television ==
Year	Title	Role	Episode/Notes
2006	Top Chef	Herself	5 episodes
2007	Cook Yourself Thin	Herself	Presenter
2010–2012	Unique Eats	Herself	
2011	Extreme Chef	Herself	Judge
2011–2012	Iron Chef America	Herself	Judge
2013	Playing with Fire	Herself	
2020	Selena + Chef	Herself	Chef
