= Playing with Fire (2013 TV series) =

- Anna Boiardi, Candice Kumai, Derek Koch, Julie Elkind, Daniel Koch (from left)
- Genre: Documentary
- Starring: Anna Boiardi; Candice Kumai; Daniel Koch; Derek Koch; Julie Elkind
- Country of origin: United States
- No. of seasons: 1
- No. of episodes: 6

Production
- Executive producers: Bruce David Klein; Joseph Eardly; Lorri Leighton
- Running time: 40 to 43 minutes
- Production company: Atlas Media Corporation

Original release
- Network: E!
- Release: March 17 – April 26, 2013

Playing with Fire is an American reality documentary television series on E! and premiered on March 17, 2013.

== Premise ==
The series chronicles the personal and professional lives of five chefs, stars and taste-makers who have risen to the top of New York's culinary world.

== Cast ==
=== Main ===
- Anna Boiardi — Boiardi is an Italian-born, New York socialite. She is the great niece of the founder of Chef Boyardee, her father being the nephew of the Chef. Within the series, Boiardi's new business venture which brings traditional Italian cuisine to today's modern kitchens is shown plus her home life as being a wife and a mother.
- Candice Kumai — Kumai participated in the first season of Top Chef, sat on the judging panel of Iron Chef America and hosted Cook Yourself Thin.
- Daniel and Derek Koch — The Koch brothers' first career choice was modeling until the duo opened their boutique and hospitality company, Dual Groupe. They also own restaurant-and-nightclub TOY, French-inspired restaurant Chateau Cherbuliez and are known for their Day & Night brunch parties.
- Julie Elkind —Elkind is a pastry chef and an accomplished kick-boxer who was voted onto Zagat's list of 30 Under 30 Hot Chefs in New York in April 2012. Her struggle to find her biological mother and taking her relationship with her boyfriend, Kyle, are shown in the series.

=== Guest appearances ===
- Jennifer Esposito —Esposito, who was diagnosed with Celiac disease in 2009, is shown as she opens her gluten-free bakery, Jennifer's Way, and partners with Anna Boiardi to instruct a cooking class featuring gluten-free Italian meals. Despite the series even starting, E! is working with Esposito to possibly have her own spin-off series which documents the day-to-day operations at her bakery now that it's open.
- Todd English

== Episodes ==
No.	Title	Original release date	U.S. viewers (millions)
1	"I Come First, You Come Second"	March 17, 2013	0.35
2	"If We Lose This Restaurant, You Lose Me"	March 24, 2013	0.36
3	"I Only Use Half of My Brain Half of the Time"	April 5, 2013	0.13
Note: First episode to air at the series' new time slot on Fridays at 8:00 PM ET/PT.
4	"Keep Your D... in Your Pants"	April 12, 2013	0.17
5	"Give It Up for the Loser!"	April 19, 2013	0.05
6	"Three's a Crowd"	April 26, 2013	0.13
