= Atlas Media Corp. =

American production company

- Type: Corporation
- Industry: Entertainment Industry
- Founded: 1989
- Founder: Bruce David Klein
- Headquarters: New York City, United States
- Products: TV Series, TV Specials, Theatrical Documentaries, Web Series
- Website: http://atlasmedia.tv

Atlas Media Corp. is a New York-based independent production company of non-fiction entertainment. The company was founded in 1989 by Bruce David Klein and produces television series and specials, theatrical documentaries, and digital web series for cable networks and streamers like HBO, Discovery Channel, Amazon, Travel Channel, Netflix, E! Network, TLC, Food Network, A&E, History, WE, GSN, DIY Network, Investigation Discovery, Style, National Geographic, BIO, SyFy, and HGTV—as well as national syndication and international distribution in over 100 markets worldwide.

For ten years in a row, Realscreen magazine has named Atlas to its annual "Global 100" list of the largest and most influential producers of non-fiction entertainment around the world.

== Television ==
Atlas Media Corp.'s projects have covered many genres of reality television including formatted reality (Hotel Impossible, Auction Agent, Big Brian: The Fortune Seller); docusoap (Playing with Fire, Big Sexy, Hot Listings Miami); docudrama (Breaking Vegas, Who Killed Chandra Levy?, Evacuate Earth, Alien Invasion: Are We Ready?); documentary (American Eats, It Could Happen Tomorrow, Mysterious Places, Exotic Islands, Things You Have To See To Believe); science and technology (Super Tools, Factory Floor); medical mystery (Dr. G: Medical Examiner, Skeleton Stories), wildlife (Maneaters of the Wild, Shark Terror with Stacey Keach), true crime (Stalked: Someone's Watching, Frenemies: Loyalty Turned Lethal); comedy (Phowned, How They Won with Mo Rocca; adventure (Everest: Mountain of Dreams, Mountain of Doom); light entertainment (Out of This World, Amazing People); food (Top 5, Extreme Cuisine, Behind the Bash with Giada DeLaurentis); Lifestyle/How To (Raising House, All Year Round With Katie Brown, Survival Guide, Romantic Inns); pop culture (Biography, Young, Sexy &..., Royal Families of the World, TV Game Show Hall of Fame); and game shows (Spend It Fast!, Bragging Rights, Beach Ambush).

Atlas Media Corp.'s programming has won numerous awards including multiple Cine Gold Eagles, New York Festivals Gold Medals, the Genesis Award, and the James Beard Award for Best TV Food Journalism. In 2009, its series Art Attack with Lee Sandstead earned an Emmy nomination.

The company has produced numerous hit shows, include Hotel Impossible (for Travel Channel), Stalked: Someone's Watching (for Investigation Discovery), Frenemies: Loyalty Turned Lethal (for Investigation Discovery), Raising House (for DIY Network), Dr. G: Medical Examiner (for Discovery Fit & Health and TLC), Top 5 and Behind the Bash with Giada DeLaurentiis (Food Network).

In 2011, Atlas produced the television movie "Who Killed Chandra Levy?", which aired on TLC and was called "a terrific docudrama" by the New York Post.

== Theatrical Documentaries ==
In 2007, Atlas Media launched a theatrical documentary division to produce and release feature-length documentaries. The first film from this division, Meat Loaf: In Search of Paradise was an official selection of the Montreal World Film Festival and was released theatrically in 100 North American markets in March 2008. The film is a portrait of the rock performer Meat Loaf, shot during the preparation for and beginning of his 2007 world tour. The film received positive reviews from The New York Times ("amusing"), Variety ("revealing ... leaps off the screen"), and many others. The film was directed by Bruce David Klein. It was released in association with Voom HD Pictures and IFC. The DVD was released by Universal in May 2008.

Atlas Media Corp's second theatrical documentary was Robert Blecker Wants Me Dead, which premiered at the USA Film Festival, and was shown at the Rhode Island International Film Festival as well as the Cork International Film Festival in Ireland. It received a Gold Kahuna Award from the 2009 Honolulu International Film Festival. Its theatrical run began in New York City on February 27, 2009, and the film made its television premiere on MSNBC on April 19, 2009.

In Fall 2016, Atlas released another theatrical documentary Best Worst Thing That Ever Could Have Happened directed by Lonny Price, produced by Bruce David Klein, executive produced by Scott Rudin, and featuring Stephen Sondheim, Hal Prince, Jason Alexander, Mandy Patinkin and others was an official selection of the New York Film Festival. The film was released in theaters on November 18, 2016, to rave reviews—Entertainment Weekly called it "A Triumph", the Washington Post "Heart-piercing", Rolling Stone "Mesmerizing"—and the NY Times said "a sense of wonder animates every frame and leaves you with a misty-eyed glow." The film was included lists of the Best Films of 2016 by the New York Times , The Wrap, and Newsweek —and is currently 94% "Fresh" on Rotten Tomatoes.

In July 2021 Atlas announced that it had signed a deal with stage and screen legend Liza Minnelli to produce a feature documentary incorporating "lost footage" of Liza during her spectacular rise in the 1970s. The film is to be produced and directed by Bruce David Klein.

In February 2022, HBO premiered an Atlas film written and directed by Bruce David Klein -- Icahn: The Restless Billionaire, focusing on the controversial corporate raider/billionaire Carl Icahn. In 2023, the film was nominated for an Emmy.

In January 2025, Atlas Media premiered the film Liza: A Truly Terrific Absolutely True Story, which focuses on the stage and screen legend Liza Minnelli. The film premiered in 75 cities in the USA, followed by a run on PBS' American Masters series. The film has since been distributed internationally to 50+ markets, on in-flight programs, and on blu-ray.

== Digital & Emerging Media ==
Atlas Media Corp. launched its Digital & Emerging Media division in 2007. One of their first productions was a series of webisodes for History.com to complement the History Rocks television special series premiere on The History Channel. Similarly, they produced a series of 2-3 minute pieces for The History Channel's video-on-demand (VOD) component to accompany the 2007 television series American Eats.

The division also produced its first series for Comcast's FEARnet online network in 2007, Rt. 666: America's Scariest Home Haunts. A new webisode was released every day throughout the month of October as part of a month-long Halloween stunt. In October 2008, they created Streets of Fear, also for FEARnet.

Other recent productions from the Digital & Emerging Media Division of Atlas Media Corp. include Expedition: Africa webisodes for History.com, Breaking Down for FUSE TV online, Path to the Podium and The Vote 101, for History.com, How to Beat Death for Discovery.com, and Total Beauty Makeover: Dog Edition, for Lifetime.com. The division also operates Atlas Media Corp.'s own online channel, the MUST SEE BELIEVE on YouTube, which features short videos about amazing people, places and events.

== Multiplatform ==
In October 2008, Atlas Media Corp. expanded one of its long-running shows, Dr. G: Medical Examiner, into a multi-platform brand, starting with Dr. G's book project How Not to Die: Surprising Lessons on Living Longer, Safer, and Healthier from America's Favorite Medical Examiner, published by Random House's Crown division. The multi-platform effort also included the production of a corresponding one-hour TV Special entitled "How Not to Die" for the Discovery Health network and the development of the companion website HowNottoDie.com.

== Productions ==
=== Television shows ===
- How To Survive the End of the World (2013) - National Geographic Channel
- Dixie Divers (2013) - Discovery Channel
- Bad Teacher (2013) - Investigation Discovery
- Hot Listings Miami (2013) - Style Network
- Playing with Fire (2013) - E! Network
- Evacuate Earth - (2012) - E! Network
- Frenemies: Loyalty Turned Lethal (2012) - Investigation Discovery
- Hotel Impossible (2012) - Travel Channel
- Raising House (2012) - DIY Network
- Top 5 Travel (2012) - Travel Channel
- Auction Agent (2012) - HGTV
- 100 Shows to See Before You Die (2011-2012) - TV Guide Network
- Stalked: Someone's Watching (2011) - Investigation Discovery
- Alien Invasion: Are We Ready? (2011) - Discovery Channel
- Dr G: Inside the Caylee Anthony Case (2011) - TLC
- Who Killed Chandra Levy? (TV Movie - 2011) - TLC
- Big Brian the Fortune Seller (2011) - TruTV
- Big Sexy (2011) - TLC
- "Alien Invasion: Are We Ready?" (2011) - Discovery Channel
- Big Law: Deputy Butterbean (2011) - Investigation Discovery
- Turnaround King (2011) - National Geographic Channel
- 100 Hollywood Crimes, Misdemeanors, & Dirty Deeds (2011) - TV Guide Network
- 25 Biggest TV Blunders 2 (2011) - TV Guide Network
- Ultimate Encounters (2010) - TruTV
- Phowned! (2010) - Spike
- Mary Knows Best (2010) SyFy
- 25 Biggest TV Blunders (2010) - TV Guide Network
- Toxic Files (2009) - Planet Green
- Dr.G: America's Most Shocking Cases (2009) - Discovery Fit & Health
- Humanly Impossible (2009-2011) - National Geographic Channel
- Biography (TV Series) (2004-2009) - Biography
- Royal Inquest (2009) - TLC
- Country Living House of the Year (2009) - DIY Network
- Dr. G: Medical Examiner (2003-2009) - Discovery Fit & Health/ TLC
- Trial by Fire (2008) - History Channel
- How Not to Die (2008) - Discovery Fit & Health
- Play It Back (2008) - GSN
- Factory Floor with Marshall Brain (2008) - National Geographic Channel
- Art Attack with Lee Sandstead (2008) - Travel Channel
- Everyday Things (2007) - National Geographic Channel
- Six Degrees of Francis Bacon (2006) - History Channel
- TV Game Show Hall of Fame (2006) - GSN
- Hollywood Hair Affair (2006) - DRG
- Gotta Get It! (2007) - Food Network
- History Rocks (2005-2007) - The History Channel
- American Eats (2006-2007) - The History Channel
- Super Tools (2006) - The History Channel
- It Could Happen Tomorrow (2005-2006) - The Weather Channel
- Katrina: The Lost Episode (TV special) (2006) - The Weather Channel
- Skeleton Stories (2005) - Discovery Fit & Health
- Breaking Vegas (2003-2004) - The History Channel
- Behind the Bash with Giada DeLaurentiis (2005-2006) - The Food Network
- How They Won with Mo Rocca (2005) - History Channel
- Tool Box (2004) - History Channel
- Young, Sexy &... (2003-2004) - WE
- Ultimate Holidaytown USA (2003) - A&E
- All Year Round with Katie Brown (2002-2004) - A&E
- Beach Ambush (2003) - OLN
- Bragging Rights (2003) - OLN
- Forecast Earth (2003) - The Weather Channel
- Top 5 (2000-2003) - The Food Network
- TV's Greatest Food Moments (2003) - The Food Network
- Survival Guide (2003) - Fine Living
- Spend It Fast! (2002) - Warner Bros./WE
- Big Deals: The Good, the Bad & the Ugly (2002) - History Channel
- Alien Abduction (2002) - Discovery Channel
- Caught (2002) - TLC
- What Happened After...? (2001) - History Channel
- American Classics with Dick Clark (2001) - History Channel
- Royal Families of the World (1998-2000) - WE
- Romantic Inns of America (1995-1996) - Travel Channel
- American Drinks: History in a Glass (1999) - History Channel
- History's Lost & Found (1997-2001) - History Channel
- Exotic Islands I & II with Hunter Reno (1997-2000) - Travel Channel
- Rituals of the World (1997) - TLC
- Amazing People (1995-1996) - APTV/ International
- Out of this World (1994-1996)- APTV
- Mysterious Places with Stacy Keach (1994-1996) - Travel Channel
- Maneaters of the Wild (1994) - A&E
- Tennis World (1993-1994) - Travel Channel
- Shark Terror (1992) - (syndication)
- Golfing America and the World (1990-1993) - Travel Channel

=== Theatrical Documentaries ===
- Robert Blecker Wants Me Dead (2009)
- Meat Loaf: In Search of Paradise (2008)

=== Web series ===
- Expedition
- Streets of Fear (2008)
- Total Beauty Makeover: Dog Edition (2008)
- The Vote 101 (2008)
- How to Beat Death (2008)
- Path to the Podium (2008)
- Route 666: America's Scariest Home Haunts (2007)
- Breaking Down (2007)
- American Eats (2007)
- History Rocks (2007)
