= Big Sexy (TV series) =

2011 American television series

- The cast of Big Sexy (l-r): Gomez, Roach, Curry, Medlik, Bank
- Starring: Tiffany Bank; Audrey Lea Curry; Nikki Gomez; Leslie Medlik; Heather Roach
- Country of origin: United States
- No. of seasons: 1

Production
- Production company: Atlas Media Corporation

Original release
- Network: TLC
- Release: August 30 – September 13, 2011

Big Sexy is a three-part reality series about plus size fashion models, that premiered on TLC on Tuesday, August 30, 2011 at 10:00 PM (ET/PT)/ 9:00 PM CT. The series chronicles six plus sized young women who move to New York City to follow their dreams of becoming models.

On December 2, 2011, the first three episodes began re-airing on Discovery Fit & Health. However, the series is no longer listed on the station website's list of television shows.
