= Epic Conditions =

- Country of origin: United States

Production
- Running time: Variable

Original release
- Network: The Weather Channel
- Release: March 4, 2007

Epic Conditions is a non-fiction television series shown on The Weather Channel that premiered on Sunday, March 4, 2007. The show's main emphasis to show viewers about how weather can affect athletic and sports events. Epic Conditions and WeatherVentures launched as The Weather Channel's first HD programs on Monday, October 1, 2007 - HD studio shows would not start until eight months later.
