= Dr. G: Medical Examiner =

American documentary-reality television series

- Genre: Reality, Documentary
- Written by: Christopher Carlson; Gretchen Morning; Emi Macuaga; Kellen Hertz
- Starring: Jan C. Garavaglia
- Narrated by: Jeff Colt
- Country of origin: United States
- No. of seasons: 8
- No. of episodes: 88 (and 2 specials)

Production
- Executive producer: Bruce David Klein
- Producers: Fahad Vania; Royd Chung
- Running time: 60 minutes
- Production company: Atlas Media Corp.

Original release
- Network: Discovery Health; Discovery Fit & Health
- Release: July 23, 2004 – February 10, 2012

Dr. G: Medical Examiner is a reality television series that originally aired on Discovery Health Channel and Discovery Fit & Health. Dr. G, or Dr. Jan Garavaglia, was the Chief Medical Examiner with Florida's District Nine Medical Examiner's office in Orlando, Florida.

This series features Dr. G working on unexplained deaths in Orange and Osceola counties in Florida, as well as similar deaths from her previous employment as an Associate Medical Examiner in Bexar County, Texas. The show features dramatized re-enactments of the events leading up to the person's death as well as the autopsies. Interviews with Dr. G, family members, and other people connected to the deaths are also shown.

Dr. G also hosted a five-episode spinoff series titled Dr. G: America's Most Shocking Cases, in which she takes viewers out of her own morgue and profiles some of history's most baffling forensic mysteries. The spinoff aired from October 2009 to April 2010 on Discovery Health Channel and was narrated by Jon Prevatt.

Dr. G: Medical Examiner and its spinoff were produced by NY-based Atlas Media Corporation, with Executive Producer Bruce David Klein.

== Synopsis ==
The unexplained deaths that Dr. G investigates can be attributed to various causes, such as undiagnosed medical conditions, accidents, or foul play. In one instance, a woman who attempted suicide died a few days after her attempt. Dr. G found that her death was actually due to another condition and was not by her own hand. Another instance dealt with human bones that had been found alongside railroad tracks. Through an autopsy and investigative work it was discovered that the remains were those of a missing girl who had been killed by her mother.

== Episodes ==
Dr. G: Medical Examiner premiered on July 23, 2004, and its final episode aired on February 10, 2012, for a total of 88 episodes and 2 specials.

Season	Episodes	Season premiere	Season finale	Network
1	12	July 23, 2004	June 10, 2005	Discovery Health
2	13	July 15, 2005	June 23, 2006	Discovery Health
3	12	July 21, 2006	June 22, 2007	Discovery Health
4	13	November 23, 2007	August 1, 2008	Discovery Health
5	13	September 29, 2008	August 10, 2009	Discovery Health
6	13	October 26, 2009	July 26, 2010	Discovery Health
7	6	October 4, 2010	November 8, 2010	Discovery Health
8	6	December 30, 2011	February 10, 2012	Discovery Fit & Health
Specials	2	October 14, 2008	January 1, 2012	Discovery Health, TLC
America's Most; Shocking Cases	5	October 19, 2009	April 16, 2010	Discovery Health

=== Season 1 (2004–05) ===
No. overall	No. in season	Title	Directed by	Written by	Original release date
1	1	"Redemption"	Bill McClane	Gretchen Morning & Christine Schillinger	July 23, 2004
The depressed 82-year-old matriarch of a devout Catholic family initially survives a suicidal overdose on painkillers but dies the next day, and Dr G finds evidence that her death may not have been caused by the suicide attempt; a 50-year-old former homeless man who complained of a headache is found dead the next morning; Dr. G works for three months to give a father of three the true cause of his wife's sudden death after she dies in her sleep.
2	2	"Hit and Run"	Bill McClane	Christopher Carlson, Bill McClane & Jodi Coffman	July 30, 2004
Dr. G finds no evidence of vehicular injury on an alleged hit-and-run victim found in a parking lot; an elderly woman is found dead at the bottom of a staircase outside her apartment building; a man with a genetic disorder dies of a brain tumor at his 35th birthday party, and Dr. G tries to determine whether his brother, who also has the genetic disorder, is at risk of dying in the same manner.
3	3	"Anger Management"	Bill McClane	Jodi Coffman & Ted Schillinger	August 6, 2004
A depressed man dies after complaining that he feels ill, and his cause of death may have health implications for his ex-wife; an English tourist collapses and dies after a heated argument with his family; a man with a severe headache calls 911, and he dies after paramedics find nothing wrong with him and leave.
4	4	"The Mystery of the Haunted Crossing"	Bill McClane	Jerry Tully & Ted Schillinger	October 22, 2004
A pile of human bones is found at a supposedly haunted railroad crossing, and a girl claims the bones are those of her murdered sister; a man who felt weak and dizzy is found dead in his apartment the next day.
5	5	"The Chain of Life and Death"	Bill McClane	Ted Schillinger, Jodi Coffman, Teresa Giordano, Ellen Sherman & Gretchen Morning	October 29, 2004
An elderly woman who drank lye soap as a child and recently had hip surgery dies in the hospital after having a convulsion; a young man dies after falling off his bicycle onto the street; Dr. G finds evidence that a transsexual stripper's death may be linked to a dangerous form of breast augmentation.
6	6	"Who is Watching the Children?"	Bill McClane	Ted Schillinger & Gretchen Morning	November 5, 2004
Two babies are found smothered to death in a house shared by two families, and a 12-year-old girl becomes the prime suspect; a young pregnant mother who claims to have ovarian cancer dies a week after checking into a homeless shelter.
7	7	"Dark Waters"	Bill McClane	Ted Schillinger & Jodi Delaney	November 19, 2004
A homeless man is found dead and decomposing in a pond; a babysitter claims a child under her care died when his neck was accidentally pinned between a bed frame and a playpen; an English tourist collapses and dies after a heated argument with his family. NOTE: The third case is a repeat from "Anger Management"
8	8	"A Cry for Help"	Bill McClane	Gretchen Morning, Teresa Giordano, Christopher Carlson & Bill McClane	January 28, 2005
Police respond to the sound of gunshots and find a dead man in a pool of blood in a parking lot, but Dr. G finds no evidence of bullet entry; a theme park security guard calls his girlfriend for help in a state of confusion and is later found dead in his car; a traveler from New York is found dead in bed while staying at his sister's house.
9	9	"A Mother's Love"	Bill McClane	Gretchen Morning & Bill McClane	February 4, 2005
A baby is taken away from his parents and placed in foster care on suspicions of child abuse after he inexplicably obtains a skull fracture, and the family's lawyer asks for Dr. G's professional opinion on how the fracture occurred; a woman dies in the hospital nearly a year after a car accident leaves her paralyzed, but her mother believes she was poisoned by her husband.
10	10	"Ashes to Ashes"	Bill McClane	Gretchen Morning & Bill McClane	March 11, 2005
A fire is discovered on a rural highway in which three bodies have been burnt beyond recognition, and Dr. G works with the Texas Rangers to identify the victims and find out who killed them; a man with no medical records dies on a city bus.
11	11	"Fighting for the Truth"	Bill McClane	Bill McClane, Gretchen Morning & Peter Van Pelt	April 22, 2005
A man known for starting brawls is found murdered in the kitchen of the restaurant where he works; a man dies after intentionally overdosing on acetaminophen, which in most cases is not fatal.
12	12	"Dying to Be Young"	Bill McClane	Bob Higgins, Emi Macuaga, Bill McClane & Gretchen Morning	June 10, 2005
A wife taking over forty dietary supplements is found dead in bed; a man tries to ride his bike home after a night of drinking and turns up dead in a roadside ditch.

=== Season 2 (2005–06) ===
No. overall	No. in season	Title	Directed by	Written by	Original release date
13	1	"Death on the Road"	David Guertin	Valerie Shepherd, Gretchen Morning & Bruce Kennedy	July 15, 2005
A man is found in a motel room hundreds of miles from home with his head blown off by a shotgun; Dr. G gives a tour of the morgue and explains how certain tools and procedures work; a man is ostensibly killed by a car crash, and Dr. G studies whether his heart condition also played a role in his death.
14	2	"The Mourning After"	David Guertin	Gretchen Morning & Bruce Kennedy	July 22, 2005
A man's ex-wife finds him face-down in a hotel bathtub, but Dr. G finds no evidence of drowning; a young man is found dead in bed after a night of partying.
15	3	"A Shot in the Dark"	David Guertin	Valerie Shepherd, Emi Macuaga & Craig Coffman	July 29, 2005
A man is shot in the head at a social gathering, and his friends claim the gun accidentally fired when it fell to the floor; Dr. G shares her professional insights into car crash fatalities; a cab driver's death may be linked to amphetamine abuse.
16	4	"Prescription for Change"	David Guertin	Gretchen Morning	August 19, 2005
A depressed woman dies at a friend's house, and her prescription pill bottle is empty; a woman with a foot ulcer passes out in a hotel room and dies en route. to the hospital
17	5	"Burning Questions"	David Guertin	Valerie Shepherd, Bruce Kennedy, Gretchen Morning & Craig Coffman	September 16, 2005
A young man is found dead in a burning car in a parking garage after night of drinking; a man with kidney failure dies in the hospital with his ex-wife by his side, but the man's hospital roommate claims the ex-wife strangled him to death.
18	6	"A Fatal Attraction"	David Guertin	Gretchen Morning, Michael Joseloff & Craig Constantine	October 3, 2005
A couple is found stabbed to death in a car in front of a church; a woman claims she shot her boyfriend in self defense, but the forensic evidence suggests otherwise.
19	7	"The Things Men Do"	David Guertin	Gretchen Morning, Michael Joseloff, Craig Coffman & Craig Constantine	November 7, 2005
A young man is found dead inside an overturned pickup truck, but his injuries do not appear to be fatal; two men lead a motorist to the decomposing body of a hiker in the Texas desert and then flee the scene; Dr. G provides a look at the techniques and routines of her medical investigators.
20	8	"Truth of the Matter"	David Guertin	Emi Macuaga, Gretchen Morning & Craig Constantine	December 9, 2005
A man claims he accidentally shot his wife on a hunting trip; Dr. G and her co-workers speculate as to why men are more prone to accidents resulting from stupidity; a man dies two weeks after suffering a severe beating.
21	9	"Paths of Destruction"	Andy Montejo & David Guertin	Gretchen Morning & John Morning	March 17, 2006
A Vietnam veteran dies in the hospital two weeks after a suicide attempt; a mother who had recently suffered complications from gastric bypass surgery is found dead in her apartment three days after going on a drinking binge.
22	10	"Needle in the Haystack"	Fahad Vania & Andy Montejo	Craig Coffman	March 24, 2006
A mentally handicapped man collapses and dies while eating lunch; a chronic pain sufferer is found dead and decomposing in his apartment.
23	11	"A Lingering Question"	Fahad Vania & Andy Montejo	Emi Macuaga	June 9, 2006
A woman claims she shot her abusive husband in self-defense, but the forensic evidence doesn't add up; a diabetic woman is found dead and nude in the trailer of a convicted sex offender.
25	12	"Kiss of Death?"	Fahad Vania & Andy Montejo	Gretchen Morning, Bill McClane & John Morning	June 16, 2006
A woman develops a full-body rash and dies two weeks after kissing a stranger at a bar; a man dies in his yard after suffering an apparent seizure.
25	13	"The Desperate Crossing"	Fahad Vania & Andy Montejo	Craig Coffman	June 23, 2006
A quadriplegic woman is found dead in a park over 100 feet away from her wheelchair; a diabetic man with a recent illness dies en route to the hospital.

=== Season 3 (2006–07) ===
No. overall	No. in season	Title	Directed by	Written by	Original release date
26	1	"Dangerous Forces"	Fahad Vania & Andy Montejo	Emi Macuaga	July 21, 2006
A girl collapses and dies at a waterpark, and Dr. G studies whether the rides contributed to her death; a ranch owner is found dead and nude next to her all-terrain vehicle.
27	2	"Poison Control"	Fahad Vania & Andy Montejo	Craig Coffman, Gretchen Morning & Lizzie Blenk	July 28, 2006
A construction foreman is found dead and decomposing in his van a few days after receiving a head injury at work; the bloodied body of a homeless man is found in the back of his car, and one of Dr. G's medical investigators rips his glove and gets the dead man's blood in an open cut; a recovering heroin addict is found dead and bruised in a drainage ditch in a high drug use area.
28	3	"A Fatal Mistake"	Fahad Vania & Andy Montejo	Craig Coffman, David Mettler & Lizzie Blenk	September 29, 2006
A young man with a history of suicide attempts and drug abuse is found dead on his friends' couch; an unpopular hotel manager is found dead at the bottom of the stairs in his living quarters; Dr. G accepts a marriage proposal.
29	4	"Deadly Consequences"	Fahad Vania & Andy Montejo	Gretchen Morning & John Morning	October 6, 2006
An AIDS patient collapses and dies at a bar a week after visiting the hospital for a throat infection, and Dr. G investigates the hospital diagnosis; a man with kidney disease is found dead at home in a pool of blood with his wrist apparently slashed; Dr. G prepares for her upcoming wedding.
30	5	"Deadly Arrest"	Fahad Vania & Andy Montejo	Emi Macuaga	October 13, 2006
A man dies after being subdued by police; a young woman dies a week after an apparent miscarriage; Dr. G's wedding day arrives.
31	6	"On the Run"	Fahad Vania & Andy Montejo	Craig Coffman, Lizzie Blenk & Loren Bevans	December 8, 2006
A man dies in a group home for mentally challenged adults on Thanksgiving; an incinerated body is found in a burning car belonging to an Irish immigrant whose visa was about to expire.
32	7	"Old Wounds Run Deep"	Fahad Vania & Andy Montejo	Gretchen Morning & John Morning	January 26, 2007
An elderly man with dementia is discovered dead in his back yard with severe cuts and bruises the morning after an ice storm; Dr. G studies whether a man's death was caused by complications from a shooting that rendered him paraplegic three decades earlier.
33	8	"A Deadly Business"	Fahad Vania & Andy Montejo	Emi Macuaga & Charlotte Stobbs	February 2, 2007
Dr. G recounts her first case as a medical examiner, in which numerous decomposing bodies were found in a funeral home, and multiple bodies buried by that same funeral home were found stuffed into single coffins; a Vietnam veteran with PTSD dies suddenly and unexpectedly at home after the hospital dismisses his chest pain as a panic attack.
34	9	"Dangerous Speeds"	David Guertin, Fahad Vania & Andy Montejo	Craig Coffman, Valerie Shepherd, Emi Macuaga, David Mettler & Lizzie Blenk	April 6, 2007
A cab driver's death may be linked to amphetamine abuse; Dr. G and field investigators explain how car wreck fatalities are processed at the scene and in the morgue; an unpopular hotel manager is found dead at the bottom of the stairs in his living quarters. Note: The cases from this episode are repeats from "A Shot in the Dark" and "A Fatal Mistake", although this episode's version of the car crash segment has some new material.
35	10	"Ticking Time Bomb"	Fahad Vania	Emi Macuaga	June 8, 2007
A man collapses and dies after crashing his car into a fence; a man is found naked and decomposing at the bottom of the stairs in his apartment.
36	11	"Dark Secrets"	Fahad Vania	Lizzie Blenk, Emi Macuaga and David Mettler	June 15, 2007
A young diabetic man is found dead on his couch after a night of drinking; an elderly man is found decomposing and covered by a tarp in the house he shared with his stepson, who flees the scene when police search the house.
37	12	"Deadly Destination"	Fahad Vania	David Mettler & Gretchen Morning	June 22, 2007
An elderly man is found dead and decomposing in his apartment, and his car is missing from the garage; an elderly man from England collapses during breakfast while visiting his family in Orlando.

=== Season 4 (2007–08) ===
No. overall	No. in season	Title	Directed by	Written by	Original release date
38	1	"Toxic Forces"	Fahad Vania	Gretchen Morning	November 23, 2007
A hurricane relief worker dies after breaking out in hives and becoming short of breath; a man is found dead by his partner just hours after making a suicide threat.
39	2	"Derailed"	Fahad Vania	Emi Macuaga, Bill McClane & Gretchen Morning	November 30, 2007
Dr. G tries to determine what caused a man to fall from a moving train; a young woman dies after having a seizure at a restaurant.
40	3	"Broken Lives"	Fahad Vania	Lizzie Blenk, Donald Slouffman & Charlotte Stobbs-Schotland	December 7, 2007
The body of a missing woman is found buried in a box in the woods; a transient man is found dead in bed at a halfway house.
41	4	"Life Interrupted"	Fahad Vania	Emi Macuaga	December 14, 2007
A female private (Tracie McBride) is abducted from an Air Force base and murdered, and Dr. G checks whether the forensic evidence is consistent with the prime suspect's confession; an elderly woman dies after a knee replacement surgery.
42	5	"Deadly Journeys"	Fahad Vania	Emi Macuaga & Gretchen Morning	December 21, 2007
A vacationer dies after experiencing chest pains and coughing up blood; a female hitchhiker collapses while having a beer with a man who gave her a ride.
43	6	"Deadly Doses"	Fahad Vania	Emi Macuaga & Bill McClane	May 23, 2008
A woman experiencing inexplicable itching accidentally overdoses on antihistamines and initially survives, but she later dies in the hospital; a depressed woman with a history of chronic pain due to a past car accident collapses and dies.
44	7	"Twist of Fate"	Fahad Vania	Gretchen Morning	May 30, 2008
An elderly woman reports experiencing severe upper body pain just prior to a minor car accident, and she dies in the hospital four days later; an elderly man experiencing abdominal pain dies in the hospital.
45	8	"Shock to the System"	Andy Montejo	Emi Macuaga	June 6, 2008
A man is found dead in a field in a high crime neighborhood with a syringe in his hand and a straight razor under his body; a charred body is found in the fiery wreckage of an 18-wheeler on the side of an interstate highway.
46	9	"Dangerous Games"	Andy Montejo	Gretchen Morning, Emi Macuaga & Michael Cargill	June 13, 2008
A 12-year-old boy is found dead in his room with his karate belt wrapped around his neck; the FBI takes interest when a Russian biochemist collapses and dies while eating lunch with colleagues.
47	10	"In the Dead of Night"	Andy Montejo	Emi Macuaga & David Mettler	June 20, 2008
An elderly man taking antibiotics for a toe infection collapses at home and dies en route to the hospital; a young man with a history of grand mal seizures dies in a motel room after a night of partying.
48	11	"Twin Terror"	Andy Montejo	Gretchen Morning & Kellen Hertz	July 18, 2008
An infant is found dead in her crib, and one of Dr. G's protégés tries to determine if the baby's surviving twin is at risk of dying in the same manner; a husband is found dead in bed with no apparent cause of death.
49	12	"Deadly Lovers Quarrel"	Fahad Vania	Emi Macuaga	July 25, 2008
A man is stabbed in the arm by his girlfriend during an argument and dies two weeks later; a man is found dead on the side of a city street, and Dr. G's only lead is a scrap of paper in his pocket prescribing a CAT scan.
50	13	"Once Bitten"	Andy Montejo	Gretchen Morning	August 1, 2008
An athlete develops severe back pain and dies several weeks after receiving an apparent spider bite; a father dies just hours after falling ill on an amusement park ride on which two people had previously died.

=== Season 5 (2008–09) ===
No. overall	No. in season	Title	Directed by	Written by	Original release date
51	1	"Under the Knife"	Lorri Leighton & Fahad Vania	Kellen Hertz	September 29, 2008
A dazed man with blood on his shirt shows up at a stranger's door and turns up dead in the woods hours later; a mother dies two days after a tummy tuck operation.
52	2	"Deadly Encounter"	Lorri Leighton & Fahad Vania	Gretchen Morning	October 6, 2008
A man dies several weeks after sustaining severe facial trauma with no memory of how he got it; a chronic pain sufferer with a history of suicide attempts is found dead in bed.
53	3	"Unlikely Suspects"	Fahad Vania	Emi Macuaga	October 13, 2008
A basketball coach is found dead in his home; Dr. G investigates whether a man's fatal brain hemorrhage was caused by a bar fight.
54	4	"Degrees of Death"	Fahad Vania	Kellen Hertz & Jess Beck	October 20, 2008
A dead man is found hanging by his pants from a neighbor's fence; a construction worker collapses and dies at a job site on a very hot day.
55	5	"One False Move"	Fahad Vania	Jess Beck, Kellen Hertz & Gretchen Morning	January 12, 2009
A man is found slumped over the rail of a footbridge with a gunshot wound to the back of his head; a young man on prescription anxiety medication is found dead in bed after night of heavy drinking.
56	6	"Cruel Intentions"	Fahad Vania	Charlotte Stobbs & Emi Macuaga	January 19, 2009
Dr. G suspects a toddler's death was caused by a natural disease, until she finds evidence of child abuse; a man collapses after mowing his grandparents' lawn and later dies.
57	7	"Fearing the Worst"	Fahad Vania	Gretchen Morning	January 26, 2009
A diabetic woman dies after a tooth extraction, and her sister fears she made a mistake while treating her for low blood sugar; an elderly woman with depression is found dead in bed.
58	8	"Secret Lives"	Fahad Vania	Charlotte Stobbs & Emi Macuaga	April 13, 2009
A woman is found dead on the floor of her apartment by her grandmother; a cheating wife and her paramour are found shot to death in bed in an apparent murder-suicide, but police suspect that the husband killed them both and staged the scene.
59	9	"Deadly Remedies"	Fahad Vania	Emi Macuaga & Jess Beck	April 20, 2009
Dr. G helps a colleague solve the case of a 10-year-old boy whose death may be linked to his prescription medication; a family chooses to donate their daughter's organs after a lightning strike leaves her braindead, and Dr. G is challenged to perform an autopsy without the girl's vital organs.
60	10	"False Impressions"	Fahad Vania	Gretchen Morning & Jess Beck	April 27, 2009
Trash bags containing a dismembered body are found in a swamp; a man is seemingly run over by a van backing out of a parking lot, but Dr. G finds no internal injuries.
61	11	"Hidden Hazards"	Fahad Vania	Emi Macuaga & Jess Beck	July 27, 2009
A father is found dead on the couch after coughing up blood, and his family suspects his well water was contaminated; a recently divorced man is found dead in bed with two bottles of prescription painkillers on his nightstand.
62	12	"Crossing the Line"	Fahad Vania	Gretchen Morning & Emi Macuaga	August 3, 2009
A man dies in his sleep while taking a nap at his parents' house; a woman is found dead on her couch a day after experiencing intense eye pain.
63	13	"Whispered Warnings"	Fahad Vania	Emi Macuaga, Gretchen Morning & Jess Beck	August 10, 2009
A waiter collapses and dies while leaving work; a woman with depression is found dead in a pool of water and blood on her bathroom floor.

=== Season 6 (2009–10) ===
No. overall	No. in season	Title	Directed by	Written by	Original release date
64	1	"Lethal Intake"	Fahad Vania	Charlotte Stobbs & Emi Macuaga	October 26, 2009
After eating a fish sandwich, a young man develops an apparent case of food poisoning and dies four days later; Dr. G autopsies the victim of a car crash involving a drunk driver.
65	2	"Last Gasps"	Fahad Vania	Charlotte Stobbs & Jess Beck	November 2, 2009
A baby dies inexplicably, and Dr. G tries to determine whether his twin sister is at risk of dying in the same manner; a young father with a history of marijuana use collapses and dies in his home.
66	3	"Deadly Silence"	Fahad Vania	Emi Macuaga, Gretchen Morning, Jonathan Koster & Jess Beck	November 9, 2009
An elderly man dies hours after falling on a sidewalk and his family is reluctant to have him autopsied for religious reasons; a florist collapses and dies in her shop.
67	4	"Fatal Twist"	Fahad Vania	Gretchen Morning, David Mettler & Emi Macuaga	November 23, 2009
A baby is found unresponsive in his crib; a woman dies after having a seizure on a city bus.
68	5	"Deadly Decisions"	Fahad Vania	J Emi Macuaga, Gretchen Morning & Jess Beck	January 11, 2010
An unidentified woman is found brutally murdered by the side of the road; a man goes out for a boat ride and is later found dead at the bottom of the lake.
69	6	"Bruised and Battered"	Fahad Vania	Samantha Grogin & Ariel Tunnell	January 18, 2010
An eight-year-old boy dies in his sleep; a man is found dead and covered in bruises on the floor of his ransacked apartment.
70	7	"Deadly Storms"	Fahad Vania	Charlotte Stobbs, Emi Macuaga & Jonathan Koster	January 25, 2010
A teenage boy falls ill and dies after an apparent seizure; a recent amputee is found dead on his couch after a night of heavy drinking.
71	8	"Fatal Flaw"	Fahad Vania	Charlotte Stobbs, Gretchen Morning & Emi Macuaga	June 7, 2010
An infant who recently had a cold becomes unresponsive and stops breathing; a cocaine user is sent home from the hospital after complaining of abdominal pain and dies two days later.
72	9	"Deadly Dive"	Fahad Vania	Samantha Grogin & Ariel Tunnell	June 14, 2010
Dr. G tries to find out what caused a boy to drown in his family's swimming pool; a man lying motionless on the railroad tracks is run over by a train.
73	10	"Deadly Descent"	Fahad Vania	Charlotte Stobbs, Emi Macuaga & Ariel Tunnell	June 21, 2010
Dr. G autopsies a pilot to help the NTSB determine what caused his plane to crash; a man is suspected of murder when his girlfriend is found dead in her apartment, face down in a pool of blood.
74	11	"A Deadly Deal"	Fahad Vania	Alexa Coyle & Emi Macuaga	June 28, 2010
A traveler from Ecuador is found dead in his hotel room; a young man dies the morning after his bachelor party.
75	12	"Disturbing Behavior"	Fahad Vania	Charlotte Stobbs & Ariel Tunnell	July 5, 2010
Dr. G tries to determine whether a woman's death was related to a brutal mugging that occurred five years earlier; a man falls from a ladder.
76	13	"Evil Intent"	Fahad Vania	Samantha Grogin	July 26, 2010
Firefighters respond to a house fire and discover the body of a young woman who has been murdered; a woman appears to have been fatally assaulted by her husband.

=== Season 7 (2010) ===
No. overall	No. in season	Title	Directed by	Written by	Original release date
77	1	"Wounded"	Fahad Vania	Charlotte Stobbs & Ariel Tunnell	October 4, 2010
A man collapses and dies at his sister's home; a teen claims his father stabbed himself to death, but the police are suspicious of his story.
78	2	"Hidden Killers"	Fahad Vania	Charlotte Stobbs & Samantha Grogin	October 11, 2010
A teen athlete's death from apparent infection may have public health implications; a woman is found dead on her couch and covered with blood from a head wound.
79	3	"Playing with Fire"	Fahad Vania	Emi Macuaga & Ariel Tunnell	October 18, 2010
A schizophrenic man dies after inexplicably erupting into a violent rage during a cookout; a pregnant woman with a deadly secret dies after experiencing chest pains.
80	4	"Deadly Bite"	Fahad Vania	Samantha Grogin & Alexa Coyle	October 25, 2010
Dr. G tries to determine whether a man found dead in bed and covered in bites was fatally attacked by his own dog; an infant is found dead in her crib.
81	5	"Deadly Circumstances"	Fahad Vania	Charlotte Stobbs, Alexa Coyle & Samantha Grogin	November 1, 2010
A man's body is found in a motel parking lot; a father who had been doing home renovations is found dead at the base of his attic ladder.
82	6	"Fatal Encounters"	Fahad Vania	Charlotte Stobbs, Samantha Grogin & Ariel Tunnell	November 8, 2010
A traveler dies after developing mysterious skin lesions; a man is shot to death when he answers a knock at his back door.

=== Season 8 (2011–12) ===
No. overall	No. in season	Title	Directed by	Written by	Original release date
83	1	"Body Burn"	Fahad Vania	Charlotte Stobbs	December 30, 2011
A woman is found burned beyond recognition in her bedroom; a known substance abuser is found dead in his home with signs of forced entry.
84	2	"Desperate Measures"	Fahad Vania	Loren Bevans, Carolyn Jacobs & Catharine Park	January 13, 2012
A woman claims her husband was killed by masked gunmen during a home invasion robbery; a breast cancer patient undergoing chemotherapy is found dead in bed.
85	3	"Deadly Holiday"	Fahad Vania	Loren Bevans, Carolyn Jacobs & Charlotte Stobbs	January 20, 2012
Dr. G tries to determine whether a hunter's death was caused by rabies; an elderly woman dies after complaining that she is choking on fish bones.
86	4	"Fatal Feud"	Fahad Vania	Carolyn Jacobs & Charlotte Stobbs	January 27, 2012
A woman is found dead at her sister's house after an argument with her brother-in-law; a teenage girl dies after experiencing flu-like symptoms.
87	5	"Clue Game"	Fahad Vania	Samantha Grogin	February 3, 2012
A man is found dead on his porch surrounded by weapons and pill bottles; a young woman with Krohn's disease is found dead in bed.
88	6	"Deadly Mistake"	Fahad Vania	Carolyn Jacobs & Charlotte Stobbs	February 10, 2012
A woman claims she found her boyfriend dead on the floor, but her story arouses suspicion; a pregnant teen is found dead at a mental health center.

=== Specials ===
Special	Title	Directed by	Written by	Original release date
1	"How Not to Die: A Dr. G Special"	Fahad Vania	Michael Cargill	October 14, 2008
Dr. G counts down the top five reasons that people end up in the morgue, shares past cases that exemplify each cause of death, and offers tips on how to avoid dying prematurely.
2	"Inside the Caylee Anthony Case"	Fahad Vania	Carolyn Jacobs & Catharine Park	January 1, 2012
Dr. G shares her findings and insights into the Caylee Anthony case. Note: This special first aired on TLC and was narrated by Jim Forbes

=== Dr. G: America's Most Shocking Cases ===
No.	Title	Directed by	Written by	Original release date
1	"Killers Among Us"	Nick Brigden & Erich Sturm	Barrett Hawes, Jess Beck, Royd Chung & Jennifer Silverman	October 19, 2009
The autopsy of a motorcycle crash victim leads to the discovery of a prolific serial killer. Then, 16-year-old Robert R. dies from a mysterious illness in 1969; newly developed forensic tests over a decade later finally reveal his cause of death and shed new light on the origins of a modern disease.
2	"Unthinkable"	Erich Sturm	Tania Castellanos & Barrett Hawes	March 26, 2010
A five-day-old infant is found dead in bed and covered in rat bites; author Sherwood Anderson falls ill and dies on a cruise to South America.
3	"Conspiracy Theory"	Joanna Chejade-Bloom, David Mettler & Erich Sturm	David Mettler	April 2, 2010
In 1953, Army scientist Frank Olson falls to his death from a tenth floor hotel window. Four decades later, an autopsy on his exhumed body and declassified CIA documents suggest he may have fallen victim to a government conspiracy.
4	"Deadly Deception"	Joanna Chejade-Bloom & Erich Sturm	Tania Castellanos & Charlotte Stobbs-Schotland	April 9, 2010
A Lebanese immigrant is found dead in his garage beneath his burning car, and his death is believed to be an accident until the autopsy brings forth a shocking revelation. Then, medical investigators race to find the cause of a mysterious and deadly disease outbreak in the southwestern United States.
5	"Twisted"	Joanna Chejade-Bloom & Erich Sturm	Joanna Chejade-Bloom & Barrett Hawes	April 16, 2010
Frank Hilley dies of an unknown illness, and his daughter develops the same symptoms four years later; an autopsy is conducted on the Texas Tower Sniper to learn what caused his actions.

== Syndication ==
Following the replacement of the Discovery Health Channel with The Oprah Winfrey Network in 2011, new episodes began airing on Discovery Fit & Health. The last episode aired in February 2012. Reruns currently air on the Justice Network (now known as True Crime Network).

As of 2022, all episodes of the series, Dr. G: America's Most Shocking Cases and its specials are made available for streaming online on The Roku Channel, Pluto TV, Tubi, Crackle (three seasons only), Peacock, Vudu, Amazon Freevee and YouTube, via FilmRise.

== Home media releases ==
On October 27, 2009, Echo Bridge Home Entertainment released the first season of Dr. G: Medical Examiner on DVD in Region 1.

DVD name	Ep #	Release date
Dr. G: Medical Examiner Season One	12	October 27, 2009

== Publications ==
On October 14, 2008, Dr. G released a book, How Not to Die: Surprising Lessons on Living Longer, Safer and Healthier from America's Favorite Medical Examiner. In the book, Dr. G identifies some of the key lifestyle and behavioral choices that can result in early death, using cases from her experience as a medical examiner. She also offers advice on how to be smart and proactive about one's health. A television special titled "How Not to Die: A Dr. G Special" aired on Discovery Health Channel on the same day the book was released.
