= Local Now =

American subscription television network

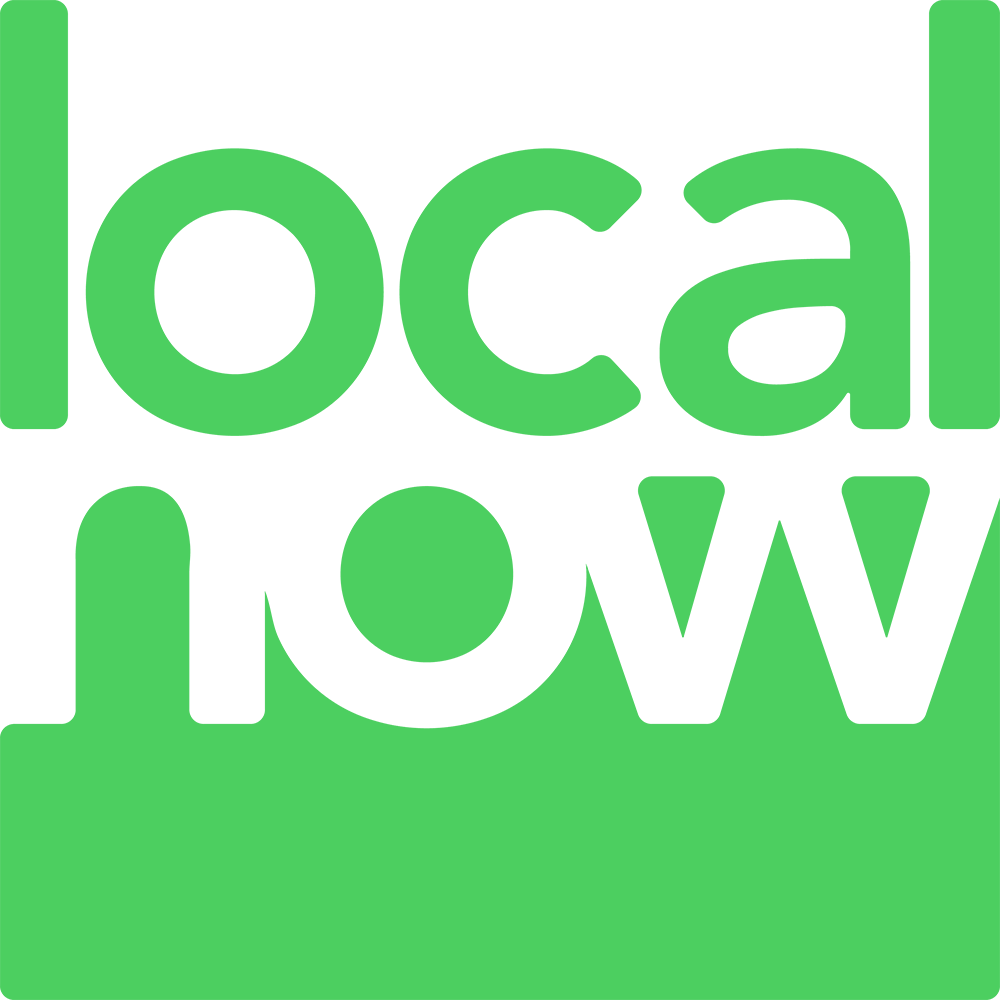
- Local Now logo
- Country: United States
- Broadcast area: United States
- Headquarters: Atlanta, Georgia

Programming
- Language: English
- Picture format: 1080p (HDTV)

Ownership
- Owner: Allen Media Group
- Parent: Weather Group Television, LLC
- Sister channels: The Weather Channel; Weatherscan; Entertainment Studios Networks; Justice Central

History
- Launched: January 25, 2016; 10 years ago

Links
- Website: www.localnow.com

Availability

Streaming media
- Official service: localnow.com#/video; (U.S. Internet subscribers only; users must enter ZIP code or city to view localized content)
- Service(s): Frndly TV, FuboTV, Sling TV, Xumo, YouTube TV

Local Now (stylized as "local now") is an American over-the-top internet television service owned by The Weather Group, LLC, a subsidiary of Allen Media Group. A spinoff of The Weather Channel, Local Now primarily provides a cyclic playlist of weather, news, sports, entertainment and lifestyle segments, incorporating localized content through feeds geared to a user-specified area.

Originally developed as a hybrid TV Everywhere service intended for subscribers of virtual multichannel video programming distributors (vMVPD), after it was acquired by Entertainment Studios in 2018, Local Now converted to a free-to-access model and has since expanded into a hybrid advertiser-supported streaming service, adding advertising video on demand (AVOD) content through digital linear channels and a selection of VOD programming supplied by Entertainment Studios, and various news providers and independent content distributors.

Local Now's programming is streamed live on the network's website; through apps for Amazon Fire TV, Android, iOS, and Roku devices; and linear pay television via Dish Network (as an app on internet-connected Hopper set-top boxes), YouTube TV, FuboTV and Sling TV. The service is operated from The Weather Channel's corporate headquarters in Atlanta, Georgia by a skeleton crew of three staff members.

== History ==
On September 9, 2015, in published reports regarding The Weather Channel's planned overhaul of its programming schedule that would refocus on forecast-based news shows and weather-related reality/documentary programs as well as pending layoffs of around 50 of TWC's 1,400 employees, sources within The Weather Company (then the corporate parent of The Weather Channel) revealed that the consortium would launch a localized weather, news and traffic service intended for over-the-top streaming services offering tiered "skinny bundles" of cable-originated television channels.

The service, which was named Local Now, would maintain a format similar to that of Weatherscan, a digital cable and satellite network featuring localized weather forecasts and traffic reports, which original TWC parent Landmark Communications launched in 1999. Developed as part of its plan to place emphasis on its internet and mobile properties, The Weather Company intended to distribute Local Now to OTT providers in lieu of or in conjunction with The Weather Channel.

In preparation for the service's launch, The Weather Channel reached agreements with various information service providers to offer content for Local Now to supplement its in-house weather data and video content. Initial partners included the Associated Press, which provides headlines and video for its local and then showbiz news segments; Sportradar, a sports information agency which provides sports scores and schedules for its local sports segment; INRIX, which provides real-time incident data sourced from intelligent transportation systems; and TrafficLand, a traffic video integration service that provides footage from cameras maintained by state departments of transportation. The Weather Channel collaborated with Arris Global Services to provide technological management services for Local Now, handling design and integration, test validation, deployment, customized HTML software development and managed services. Local Now utilizes integration of the company's transcoders and Anevia's ViaMotion+ packaging software, and was the first service to implement CPE virtualization technology from ActiveVideo (a cloud video provider operated as joint venture of ARRIS and Charter Communications).

Local Now launched on January 25, 2016, initially exclusive to subscribers of Sling TV that, at minimum, receive its base "Best of Live TV" tier, with support for Amazon Fire TV, Android devices (including Android TV), and Google Chromecast. The service was designed with younger news consumers in mind, allowing a viewer to get constantly updated local news, weather, sports and traffic information in a condensed format at any time of the day. As noted by Freddy Flaxman, chief operating officer of The Weather Group (which became The Weather Channel's corporate parent after IBM purchased The Weather Company's digital assets in January 2016), this allows Local Now to better compete in a media landscape where consumers are increasingly consuming local news content via the Internet and smartphone apps, instead of waiting to watch long-form newscasts that air between one and five times per day on most major network affiliates and some independent stations.

On March 4, 2016, Local Now launched a channel on Roku, which provides live streams of the service's national and local feeds to OTT subscribers who use Roku's digital media players. On May 13, 2016, The Weather Channel announced that it would unveil standalone Local Now mobile apps for Apple and Android devices, which would extend access to the channel to cable and satellite subscribers who receive TWC. The apps, which were made available on the Apple App Store and Google Play on June 8, provide live streams of Local Now's 226 local feeds and The Weather Channel, accessible by entering an authenticated login from a participating conventional or over-the-top MVPD provider (those who do not subscribe to a participating provider can view the Local Now feeds via a 30-day free trial, in which users must enter their email address in the login dialog to send a linked message to their account which grants them access).

On December 14, 2016, The Weather Group announced a multi-year distribution agreement with fuboTV, in which Local Now and The Weather Channel would be included as part of an expanded service set to launch in early 2017, designed to compete with Sling TV and other OTT competitors such as PlayStation Vue and DirecTV Now, that would offer 70+ broadcast and cable networks.

On February 28, 2017, as part of Google's unveiling of YouTube TV, the company announced – through a carriage agreement with NBCUniversal – that Local Now and The Weather Channel would be among the channels included as part of the over-the-top MVPD service's initial lineup when it launched in select major U.S. cities that spring. YouTube TV did not include Local Now in its channel offerings at launch, and would not begin carrying the service until December 11, 2018. On March 27, 2017, The Weather Channel signed an agreement with OTT financial news channel Cheddar to provide daily business news updates for Local Now. On October 11, 2017, Dish Network began offering Local Now via an application on all generations of its internet-connected Hopper DVR set-top boxes; severe weather notifications provided by Local Now/The Weather Channel were also made available based on the user location. The following month on November 29, Xumo began offering the service as a premium digital channel through its Channel Plus tier for LG Electronics devices on channel IP-126.

On March 22, 2018, Entertainment Studios (owned by comedian and producer Byron Allen) announced its intent to acquire The Weather Channel's television assets from an NBCUniversal/Blackstone Group partnership. The actual value is undisclosed, but was reported to be around $300 million; the channel's non-television assets, which were separately sold to IBM two years prior, were not included in the sale. On May 24, 2018, The Weather Group announced it had reached a content partnership with Tronc-owned news syndication service Tribune Content Agency (TCA) to provide supplementary community-focused content for the service's local news segments. On July 18, The Weather Group announced it had reached a content partnership with Yelp to provide recommendations, reviews, images, and videos of top local restaurants and bars in each Local Now market for the network's "Tasty Stuff" segment.

== Distribution and market coverage ==
Although a spinoff of The Weather Channel, Local Now is formatted as a general news and weather channel. Because of the distribution structure of over-the-top subscription television, Local Now utilizes a version of TWC's IntelliStar unit – installed at The Weather Channel's uplink site in Atlanta – that are configured differently from that used by The Weather Channel and Weatherscan, allowing for the recycling of segments featured in one news block seamlessly into another and routine updating of segments to each of the localized feeds. Local Now's automated model – which leverages The Weather Channel's existing infrastructure and technology, and employs only three staff members – allows Local Now to be offered at a fraction of the retransmission rates charged by local broadcast stations. Users of the Local Now website and mobile app, and subscribers of over-the-top MVPD providers carrying the channel, are able to access their local feed based on ZIP code, by their IP address via geolocation, or by manual selection, allowing subscribers to access a feed from another city when they travel outside of their home market.

As of April 2017, Local Now programs 226 individual feeds covering 207 of the 210 U.S. media markets that provide local news, weather and traffic content tailored to those communities (the St. Joseph, Missouri, Presque Isle, Maine and Zanesville, Ohio markets are served by the Kansas City, Bangor and Columbus area feeds by default), with 15 of them operating as subfeeds offering hyperlocal content to individual regions of the New York City, Atlanta, Denver and Dallas markets. Most markets are served by a single local feed, though Local Now plans to eventually launch additional subfeeds for most markets to "deliver a greater degree of [aggregated content of] local relevance" than can be incorporated within a local television newscast due to the market's geographical size and time constraints.

== Programming and content ==
Local Now relies on information sourced from The Weather Channel and other content partnerships that the service maintains with the Associated Press, Reuters, Foursquare, American City Business Journals, Stadium, Cheddar, Pointslocal, SportRadar, the Internet Video Archive, TrafficLand, INRIX, Nextdoor, Fresco, FlightAware, the Tribune Content Agency and Yelp. In addition to supplying forecast data and other featured content, The Weather Channel also provides simulcasts of its live, wall-to-wall coverage in the event that a severe weather event, winter storm or landfalling tropical system affects the United States (accompanied by a red lower-tenth banner denoting the live TWC simulcast). Unlike TWC, which carries the Local on the 8s segments during storm coverage, Local Now suspends all regularly featured segments – including local forecasts – during the TWC simulcasts, with time allocated to commercial breaks on TWC filled by a slide denoting that the simulcast will return following the break.

The channel originally featured a lower display line (LDL) similar to that seen on TWC at the bottom one-tenth of the screen, to display continuous weather information and inform viewers of current and forthcoming segments in tab form and the current time (the tab highlighting the segment being aired at the time cycled between the segment's title and a countdown clock). The national feed's LDL showed current conditions (denoting the sky condition, and cycling through the temperature, wind data and if applicable, apparent temperature) and daypart forecasts for 20 major U.S. cities, and the current time in all four time zones in the Contiguous U.S. The localized versions – which were keyed over the national LDL – cycled through current conditions and forecasts for cities within proximity of the metropolitan area, with the time bar corresponding to the local time zone. As part of a graphical overhaul on February 20, 2017, the LDL was replaced by a progress bar counting down the runtime of the current segment, which had previously appeared atop the LDL; the progress bar was eventually removed on March 1, 2018.

On June 26, 2018, Local Now began employing Sasha Rionda (a veteran anchor/reporter who previously worked for E!, CNN International and CNN en Español, among other news credits) as an on-air anchor to conduct certain national news and entertainment segments and provide occasional field reports. (The addition of Rionda coincided with a refresh of the app that allowed increased content selection functionality, chaptering functions, and advanced notifications and alerts.)

=== Cycle products ===
The service maintains a "wheel" schedule that cycles in randomized intervals of, depending on the collective length of the included segments, between 15 and 20 minutes in length. (Originally, these cycles started at approximately the top of each hour, though since June 26, 2018, the segment cycles start immediately upon the user accessing an appropriate local feed.) Some segments – particularly weather and sports segments – featured in the cycle are routinely updated throughout the hour, while others – particularly news and entertainment segments – are updated every three to six hours. Each content cycle includes the following regular segments (listed in order of broadcast):

Segment	Description	Duration (seconds)
=== Weather segments ===
Weather Now	Incorporating forecast data supplied by The Weather Channel and modeled after the parent network's "Local on the 8s" segments, the segment – which leads each flavor cycle – details current weather conditions for the local area and the surrounding region (consisting of a sidebar of conditions from the city's main observation site, accompanying a map of observations for cities within a 125-to-200-mile (201 to 322 km) radius), as well as for four population centers within a radius between 50 and 75 miles (80 and 121 km) of the metropolitan area (aired as a separate flavor segment, "Around the Area," displayed in a text/icon layout similar in format to the "Latest Observations" product featured on Local on the 8s prior to April 2013). Separate radar loops are also shown, showing the movement of precipitation over the past three hours within respective radii of between 50 and 75 miles (80 and 121 km) and 75 and 100 miles (121 and 161 km) of the metropolitan area. As with Local on the 8s, the segment incorporates the IntelliStar's Vocal Local narration function, which assembles pre-recorded narration tracks (which are voiced by longtime TWC meteorologist Jim Cantore) for the current temperature and sky conditions. Originally, it was titled as "Weather Right Now".	90
Today's Weather	The segment – which follows the "News Now" feature – consists of a descriptive forecast (comprising detailed weather conditions, temperature and wind) for each period for the following 12- to 36-hour period (with the timeline of the forecast period set at specific times, usually around 3:00 a.m. or 3:00 p.m., with some intermediate updates depending on when The Weather Channel updates its forecasts for its television and digital platforms), and daypart forecasts for four population centers within a radius between 50 and 75 miles (80 and 121 km) of the metropolitan area (under the "Around the Area" format also used in the "Weather Right Now" segment). As with the later Weather segment, the segment incorporates the IntelliStar's Vocal Local narration function, which assembles pre-recorded narration tracks (which are voiced by longtime TWC meteorologist Jim Cantore). An adapted version for the national feed – which maintains the same format as The Weather Channel's national satellite version of "Local on the 8s" – features regional composite satellite-radar loops for the Northeastern, Southeastern, South Central, North Central, Northwestern and Southwestern United States, and a roundup of TWC-sourced forecasts for 12 major cities within the corresponding regions. Until June 26, 2018, the segment also featured a seven-day forecast product for the main city (which was split off into a separate segment that assumed the "Next 7 Days" originally used for the "Weather" segment from Local Now's inception), and formerly included city-specific video forecasts outlining weather for the day ahead – consisting of weather conditions for the surrounding area and daypart-based hourly forecasts for the metropolitan area – presented by The Weather Channel's meteorologists during the morning and late afternoon dayparts.	90
Extended Forecast	Introduced on June 26, 2018 and separated from the present "Weather" forecast segment, This segment consists of a seven-day forecast product for the main city. It was originally called "Next 7 Days".	30
Weather Alerts	Airing only in the event that an alert is in effect, this segment overviews current watches, warnings and/or advisories issued by the local National Weather Service forecast office for the local area (with the exception of severe thunderstorm and tornado warnings). Weather alerts – featuring detailed information sourced directly from NWS alert products – that have been issued for the local viewing area (including severe thunderstorm and tornado warnings) are also shown on a crawl that appears above the countdown progress bar, when active.	30
Weather Across America	Introduced on April 6, 2017, and originally a presenter-led segment, it features a summarical high-resolution computer model forecast for the Contiguous United States and individual regional forecasts for the day ahead. When at times it's not presenter-led, the graphic is shown region-by-region with an accompanying forecast sidebar of each region's cities, similar in fashion to The Weather Channel's national "Local on the 8s" segments.	90
Breaking Now	Introduced on April 6, 2017, the segment – which features content repurposed from TWC and Weather.com – provides in-depth coverage and analysis of expected hazardous weather threats from The Weather Channel's meteorologists.	60–90
Allergy & Air Quality	Available in most markets, this segment shows the allergens, breathing index, and pollutants, as well as the air quality across the metro area.	30
Running Outlook	Available in most markets, this segment shows the metro area's running outlook for the day and/or the next day.	15 or 30
Driving Forecast	This segment shows the city's or metro area's driving conditions for the next 24 hours and the 4 days to follow based on the weather forecasts.	30
=== News segments ===
News Now	A national and international news segment featuring video sourced by the Associated Press, which immediately follows the "Weather Right Now" segment. Originally titled 60 Now! until June 25, 2018, the segment began with a format focused strictly on video content; as a result of a network refresh on June 26, 2018, the highlighted stories began to be presented by either voice-only narration or an on-air presenter (depending on the daypart, with the anchored segments airing during the afternoon and evening hours).	90
Local News	A segment summarizing the top five major local news and sports headlines from the Associated Press and the Tribune Content Agency. While shown in the form of textual graphics instead of being presented by a news anchor, a longer version of the segment shown in select larger markets incorporates extended narration of the highlighted stories from a computer-generated voiceover as well as AP-supplied video and still photographs. On November 19, 2018, Local Now reformatted the segment to provide more localized news content, initially rolling out the revised format in the top 25 U.S. markets (including New York City, Philadelphia, Los Angeles, Chicago, Dallas–Fort Worth, Houston, Atlanta, Miami–Fort Lauderdale, Boston and Washington, D.C.).	60–120
Travel Conditions	Available in most markets, this segment features an outline map of highway and thoroughfare congestion throughout the area (denoted in order of severity as green for unobstructed flow, yellow for moderate congestion, and red for heavy congestion); a randomized summary of current average speeds for three local inbound and outbound routes, active accidents and road closures. During the peak morning and late-afternoon/evening drive times, the segment's congestion maps are accompanied on feeds serving many large and mid-sized metropolitan areas by an on-staff announcer – either from the Total Traffic & Weather Network or a local radio station partner – providing updated traffic conditions. Until 2022, the outline map was originally accompanied by a sidebar of delayed imagery by traffic cameras from up to six area intersections (available only in the approximately 45 states where TrafficLand had access to DOT camera imagery). In most markets, the segment also includes average delay times for flights arriving and departing from local airports; in smaller markets, this information may pertain to a distant regional or international airport.	45–60
Sports	It is a feature summarizing the five sports headlines of regional interest from the Associated Press showing in the same form as the news segment, followed by a "rundown" list of real-time sports scores and schedules (organized by league and accompanied by the logos of each team) compiled by Sportradar. Through a content partnership with Local Now, on April 26, 2017, the segment also began to feature video clips of sports highlights and expert analysis from 120 Sports (later Stadium) pertaining to local and nearby major league sports teams, preceding the text-based sports news summaries. Each clip is 1–5 minutes in length.	120 or over
Business News	Introduced on May 16, 2017 as "Mind Your Own Business", usually airing as the closing segment of each flavor, leading into "Weather Right Now" segment, it is a business news segment featuring national financial headlines provided by a Cheddar staff member.	60
Flu Report	This segment shows the city's or metro area's Flu Index as well as the aches and pains.	30
=== Entertainment and leisure segments ===
Showbiz Now	Introduced on June 2, 2017 under the title 60 Show Biz!, a showbiz news segment featuring video sourced by the Associated Press.	90
Screening Room	Introduced on June 26, 2018, it is a segment showcasing trailers for current film releases as well as a summary of major films set to release within the next two months.	120 or over
Restaurant Reviews	Introduced on April 6, 2017, this segment starts with three or four different "today's top picks" - the most well-known in the area that are highly recommended - with the first two being accompanied by a comment/review, followed by a list of the top ten restaurants and bars within the metropolitan area to visit for breakfast, lunch and dinner, as ranked by Foursquare City Guide and through recommendations and reviews compiled by Yelp. Until 2018, the segment was originally named "Tasty Stuff".	90
Body & Mind	Introduced on November 19, 2018, the segment highlights exercise tips, recipes and advice on healthy living.	90
Mom Life	Introduced on November 19, 2018, the segment – hosted by veteran television entertainment reporter and reality show host Adrianna Costa – follows her journey of motherhood and provides parenting advice.	90
Winning Numbers	This segment gives a rundown of latest lottery results in the state the viewers are watching from.	90 or 120
Book Reviews	Introduced in late 2021, this segment showcases books that were recently published, and were given reviews based on the ratings scale of Rave, Positive, Mixed, and Pan.	90
This Day in History	Introduced in late 2021, this segment highlights three historic moments of the day.	30 or 45
Volunteer Match	Introduced in late 2021, this segment gives a rundown of volunteering opportunities within the metro area.	60
Golfing Outlook	Introduced in late 2022, this segment gives the city's golfing outlook based on the forecasts for the day and the next 4 days to follow.	60

== Slogans ==
- Just the Facts, Please (2016–2017)
- Places, People, Stuff (2017–2018)
- Stream On / Stream Your City (advertising; 2018–present)

== See also ==
- FuboTV
- Haystack News
- IntelliStar
- LocalBTV
- NewsON
- Sling TV
- VUit
- The Weather Channel
- WeatherNation TV
- WeatherStar
