= Weatherscan =

Defunct American weather television channel

- Country: United States
- Broadcast area: Nationwide (available on selected cable providers)
- Headquarters: Atlanta, Georgia

Programming
- Language: English
- Picture format: 480i (SDTV)

Ownership
- Owner: Landmark Communications (2003–2008); Weather Group Television, LLC (Note: (consortium owned by NBCUniversal, Blackstone Group and Bain Capital)) (2008–2018); Entertainment Studios (now Allen Media Group) (2018–2022)
- Parent: The Weather Channel, Inc. (1999–2012); The Weather Company, LLC (2012–2018); Weather Group Television, LLC (2018–2022)
- Sister channels: The Weather Channel; Local Now; Entertainment Studios Networks

History
- Founded: March 1998; 28 years ago
- Launched: July 28, 1998; 28 years ago (as a national feed); March 31, 1999; 27 years ago (as a localized service)
- Closed: December 12, 2022; 3 years ago
- Former names: Weatherscan Local (1999–2003)

Weatherscan (previously Weatherscan Local from 1999 to 2003) was an American digital cable and satellite television network that offered uninterrupted local weather information. A spinoff of The Weather Channel (TWC), the automated service—which based its format on the local forecast segments that have been a mainstay of its parent network since TWC launched in May 1982—provided viewers with a continuous loop of current observations, and routine and specialized forecasts for their respective area in a graphical format; the segments were generated by a customized WeatherStar unit installed at the cable provider's headend (originally running on the WeatherStar XL, before upgrading to the first-generation IntelliStar starting in 2003).

Weatherscan—which was primarily intended for digital cable subscribers, although it was carried on basic cable tiers and, from 2011 to 2015, to subscribers of satellite provider Dish Network in selected markets—was originally launched as a national feed on July 28, 1998, under the ownership of Landmark Communications (founding owner of The Weather Channel), and began operating as a localized service on March 31, 1999. The network and other TWC assets were sold to a consortium of NBCUniversal, and private equity firms Blackstone Group and Bain Capital in 2008, and later to Entertainment Studios (now Allen Media Group) in 2018; Weatherscan ceased operations on December 12, 2022, largely the result of declining national distribution over the previous decade.

== History ==
=== Initial launch as a national feed ===
In March 1998, Landmark Communications announced plans to launch a spinoff of The Weather Channel that would provide customized weather forecasts to digital cable subscribers; Landmark signed an agreement with Tele-Communications, Inc. (TCI) to distribute the service on the provider's Headend in the Sky (HITS) digital cable multiplex service starting that summer. Weatherscan launched on participating TCI systems on July 28, 1998; as the Weather Star XL (a fifth-generation STAR model that was built for proprietary use by both The Weather Channel and Weatherscan) was still under development at the time, the channel initially operated as a national feed—similar in concept to the automated forecast segments intended for TWC's satellite viewers that aired during the network's local forecast slots—featuring current temperatures and 48-hour forecasts for seven designated regions (Northeast, Mid-Atlantic, Southeast, South Central, North Central, Northwest and Southwest) and the contiguous United States, three-day "at a glance" forecasts for 35 major US cities (each organized by region), and national and regional composite radar/satellite loops. After Weatherscan Local launched, the national feed remained available for distribution to some satellite providers and to smaller cable providers that could not afford a secondary and more technologically advanced Weatherscan STAR unit to run a localized feed of the service. (This feed was removed from most headends in 2001, and was fully discontinued by 2003 with the roll-out of the newer IntelliStar units.)

=== Conversion to localized service ===
Weatherscan officially launched its localized offering on March 31, 1999, originally consisting of five distinct automated weather information services. The first to launch with the initial rollout were Weatherscan Local (the primary service, offering a complete local weather segment every two minutes) and Weatherscan Radar (featuring a continuous 75-mile (121 km) Doppler radar loop, along with severe weather alerts when warranted). The three remaining feeds launched over the course of a month later that spring: Weatherscan Plus (featuring activity-specific forecasts for golf, skiing, boating, beachgoing, and business and leisure travel) debuted on April 30, 1999, followed by the launches of Weatherscan Plus Traffic (providing routinely updated traffic information along with the products featured on the main Weatherscan Plus product playlist) and Weatherscan Español (a Spanish-language version of Weatherscan Plus allowing for the inclusion of regional or international weather information) on May 31.

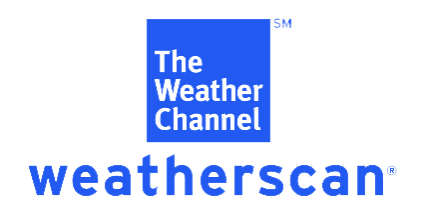
Weatherscan logo used from September 2005 to March 2016

In May 2000, Weatherscan Local folded its various services into one singular feed, based around the customized segment concept behind the Weatherscan Plus service; the specialty products featured on Weatherscan Plus and Weatherscan Español would instead be offered to cable affiiates as optional packages to provide viewers with more comprehensive weather information, while Weatherscan units also received themed backgrounds based on the regional culture (customized for densely populated areas, smaller markets and suburbs, coastal and desert areas). The XL and IntelliStar units developed for Weatherscan were configured differently from The Weather Channel's domestic units, operating on custom software to generate content for the Weatherscan service, which features different graphics schemes, and the capability to incorporate additional forecast products and display weather information on a continuous basis.

In August 2000, Landmark reached carriage deals with Comcast to offer Weatherscan Local on its digital tier in selected markets. Distribution of the network expanded further in February 2001 through deals with TCI successor AT&T Broadband (in non-legacy TCI markets affected by AT&T's 1999 purchase of the company) and Cox Communications. In December 2001, Weatherscan Local began expanding its distribution to additional Comcast markets and entered into a carriage deal with Charter Communications; by the end of that year, Weatherscan was available to an estimated 3.3 million cable subscribers. In 2003, Landmark began replacing the proprietary Weatherscan XL units with the newer sixth-generation STAR model, the IntelliStar, which debuted on the network on February 28 (several months before testing began on the TWC domestic models in selected markets).

On July 7, 2008, Landmark announced it would sell The Weather Channel, Weatherscan and related assets (including weather.com, forecasting service provider Weather Services International and a 30% stake in Montreal-based Pelmorex, owner of TWC's Canadian counterparts The Weather Network and MétéoMédia) to a consortium of NBC Universal and private equity firms Blackstone Group and Bain Capital—later incorporated as The Weather Company—for $3.5 billion. (Due to Landmark subsequently deciding to suspend seeking buyers for most of its other holdings, The Weather Channel's assets were the only property that the company sold before it began divesting its remaining print and broadcasting assets in 2012.)

On June 29, 2011, Dish Network became the first satellite provider to offer Weatherscan on their lineup, filling the channel slot previously occupied by the short-lived network The Weather Cast, which was created to replace The Weather Channel on its lineup during a May 2010 carriage dispute with the satellite provider; the DIsh Weatherscan feed, which was formatted similarly to the cable version, provided regionalized weather information for cities within 125 miles (201 km) of a given metropolitan area. (This feed was only ever made available to Dish customers in the Oklahoma City, Phoenix, Salt Lake City and Tucson markets).

=== Decline and shutdown ===
At its height, Weatherscan was available in many major US markets (reaching an estimated 22 million cable subscribers by February 2005), though its national distribution was never as widespread as that of parent network The Weather Channel. Many cable providers offered Weatherscan on their digital tiers, although a few carried the network alongside TWC on their basic service, often giving them non-adjacent channel assignments. (Most of the network's cable affiliates listed it under the boilerplate ID "Local weather" or other identifiers on their interactive program guides, including in areas where it was carried on the same channel as TV Guide Channel's scrolling program guide.)

Verizon FiOS dropped Weatherscan and The Weather Channel from its lineup on March 10, 2015, after the two parties were unable to come to terms on a new carriage agreement and coinciding with a separate carriage agreement that brought AccuWeather Network to its systems. Verizon representatives cited the main driver of letting the agreement lapse being that many of its customers received weather information on the internet and mobile apps; FiOS replaced Weatherscan with WeatherBug's set-top "widget" in some of its markets. This was followed on June 24 by Dish Network's removal of the regionalized Weatherscan feed in selected markets in favor of TWC competitor WeatherNation. Comcast began removing Weatherscan from its cable systems (by then known under the Xfinity brand) in October 2017, with its remaining markets having dropped the network by December 10 of that year.

On March 22, 2018, Entertainment Studios (now Allen Media Group) announced it would acquire The Weather Channel's television assets from The Weather Company. The actual value was not disclosed, but was reported to be around $300 million; the channel's non-television assets, which were separately sold to IBM two years prior, were not included in the sale.

The successor parents of The Weather Channel's assets (the NBCUniversal/Blackstone/Bain consortium and Allen) had done little to upgrade Weatherscan after the network's September 2005 graphical update, even as TWC began upgrading its domestic STAR units to the second-generation IntelliStar fleet (the Weatherscan units would eventually become the last of the original IntelliStar units that remained operational) starting with the rollout of the original IntelliStar 2 units in July 2010; however, the network continued to be offered to cable providers for several years afterward. While the domestic first-generation IntelliStars were decommissioned on November 16, 2015, and replaced by newer IntelliStar 2 models (including the more recent xD and Jr. versions), Weatherscan continued to run on its original proprietary IntelliStar units until the service's shutdown. Additionally, because technical constraints with the early-2000s-era IntelliStar technology in use made upgrades to the format infeasible, Weatherscan was never presented in high definition, unlike most American television news and weather services operating by the time of the network's shutdown. Many of these remaining first-generation IntelliStars were starting to experience the effects of slowly failing capacitors, as their motherboards were manufactured during the capacitor plague era of the early 2000s, and most of these proprietary Weatherscan models were not expected to remain sustainably functional within the next few years. Addressing issues with these aging units ultimately became impractical as Weather Group Television technicians stopped providing technical support or replacement units for the network's cable affiliates as early as 2021.

In a September 2022 letter to the National Content & Technology Cooperative (NCTC), of which most of the network's remaining cable affiliates were members, Weather Group Television announced its intention to discontinue Weatherscan in the service's remaining markets no later than December 9, 2022, with a preference to cease offering it sooner rather than later. The company cited declining viewership, the wide availability of local weather information online and on mobile apps, and the aging first-generation IntelliStar equipment as the main reasons for its decision to discontinue the service, which were also cited as what ultimately led to larger pay television providers deciding to drop the channel, limiting carriage of Weatherscan to small to mid-size cable affiliates from December 2017 onward. The remaining providers with operating Weatherscan IntelliStar units exercised their options to either offer in-house local weather services, switch to similar national networks like AccuWeather Network, WeatherNation and Fox Weather; or eliminate the channel space entirely. Weatherscan was officially discontinued on December 12, 2022, three days after the original end-of-service date, when the last unit (located at a Suddenlink Communications headend in Beckley, West Virginia) was believed to be decommissioned on that day.

In light of Weatherscan's closure, many fan-based spiritual successors take its place. Attempts to simulate the design of Weatherscan by hobbyists date as far back as 2003. For Weatherscan's most recognizable design that lasted until its shutdown, real-time projects date as early as 2018, kickstarted by a program based mostly off of JavaScript. Multiple contributions to said program were made over time, bringing way to newer projects that are currently accessible and maintained, along with open archival efforts of the original software. In addition, individuals in possession of the original hardware have gathered the necessary resources to revitalize the Weatherscan software, often being exhibited at Vintage Computer Festival events.

== Programming and content ==
Weatherscan primarily relied on information sourced from the National Weather Service (NWS) and The Weather Channel; Weatherscan relied on products issued by local NWS Weather Forecast Offices for its forecast products until November 2001, when TWC began disseminating forecast products developed in-house to the former's cable affiliates, less than a year before their rollout to the parent network's "domestic" (TWC-proprietary) WeatherStar units. Traffic information (in the form of accident and construction reports, roadway flow and average travel times for local roadways) was initially presented through the Weatherscan Traffic feed from March 1999 to May 2000; traffic products were restored on the main Weatherscan service in July 2005 through a content agreement between TWC and TrafficPulse that ran until December 2010.

The WeatherStar XL and IntelliStar units developed for use by Weatherscan utilized a different configuration than the domestic units utilized by The Weather Channel, featuring different graphics sets and additional weather products as well as being programmed to continuously provide weather information 24 hours a day (a feature not implemented on the domestic STAR units until the 2013 introduction of the "Weather All the Time" concept on all IntelliStar 2 models). Each forecast loop began with an introductory screen providing the network and cable provider identification, and the name of the assigned forecast city, leading into the playlist. As with The Weather Channel's domestic STAR fleet, Weatherscan's XL and IntelliStar units were able to display a crawl (at the bottom third of the screen, which occupied the space filled by the provider ID spot from 2000 to 2003, and the regional weather and advertising crawls from 2005 onward) detailing watches, warnings and advisories issued by the NWS and the Storm Prediction Center (SPC) for the local area where the unit's headend is based. (From 2000 to 2003 and from 2015 onward, instead of local NWS alert products, the crawl—which utilized different color schemes based on alert type: red for warnings, yellow for watches and orange for advisories and special weather statements—generated boilerplate hazard text directing viewers to watch The Weather Channel for additional information.)

Certain segments were introduced utilizing TWC's proprietary Vocal Local narration feature (which assembles pre-recorded audio tracks to narrate local forecast segments including current conditions and descriptive forecasts on the parent network) introduced with the WeatherStar XL fleet; these narrations were voiced by TWC staff announcer Amy Bargeron until they were removed from most routine segments on November 10, 2015. (Narrations by veteran TWC meteorologist Jim Cantore and an updated warning tone were concurrently added for severe weather alerts to match those featured on the IntelliStar 2 fleet to comply with FCC requirements that critical alerts be read aloud, which the first-generation IntelliStar was incapable of providing as it lacked second audio program (SAP) support.)

Although Weatherscan, unlike The Weather Channel, did not employ any on-air talent, the service's Weatherscan XL and IntelliStar units optionally had the capability to provide audio forecasts presented by a Weather Channel meteorologist. Local advertising on Weatherscan was primarily limited to the text-based Local Ad Sales (LAS) crawls that have been a mainstay of The Weather Channel's forecast segments since its inception as well as sponsorship tags; however, affiliates had the option of running one-minute-long conventional video ad breaks in the form of the channel's forecast/datascreen-based 'Local Avails' segment with 24-hour and five-day at-a-glance weather forecasts in horizonal form and its local radar on the right corner over a small squeezed-back video window on the left for advertised businesses under the current conditions on the near bottom-left, unlike TWC, every ten minutes starting at ten minutes past the hour. In the event that the STAR unit experienced errors generating the playlist, the main Weather Channel feed aired in place of Weatherscan's regular programming until the unit began rebooting.

When the localized version of the channel launched in March 1999, utilizing WeatherStar XL units to generate the forecast segments, Weatherscan originally utilized a similar product and graphical layout (featuring distinctive backgrounds specific to the channel) and Lower Display Line (LDL, showing current conditions and text-based local business and cable provider advertisements at the bottom one-tenth of the screen) as that seen on the domestic XL units; the main Weatherscan Local feed's programming consisted of the same products featured in the two-minute product "flavor" (Note: "Flavors" were pre-determined segment lengths for the local forecast segments generated by WeatherStar units installed at cable headends over The Weather Channel's national feed; varying by airtime (until the Local on the 8s segments permanently shifted to a fixed two-minute length in 2013) and usually ranging from 30 seconds to two minutes (or as long as six minutes between 1987 and 1996), each flavor features different sets of forecast products (with the extended forecast being the only product to be consistently featured across all playlists) in each segment list.) lineup offered at the time on The Weather Channel's local forecast segments.

In May 2000, coinciding with the network receiving a new distinctive graphics set, Weatherscan Local restructured its segments to be built around customizable specialty weather packages that featured graphical and map-based forecasts centering on various lifestyle activities (golfing, boating and beachgoing, gardening, skiing, travel and outdoors) available to cable affiliates. (National and regional maps included in some of the packages were derived from those featured on The Weather Channel's television and online services at the time.) The primary segment lineup (featuring current conditions, forecasts, almanac data, and satellite and radar imagery) was rechristened as the "Core Package", accompanied by three new optional routine forecast packages: the "Mini-Core Package" (a limited-product variant of the "Core"), the "Extra Local Area Package" (featuring current conditions and forecasts for up to three nearby cities) and the "Spanish Forecast Package" (a limited-product translated segment intended for markets with larger HIspanic/Latino populations); routine forecast segments came in both one- and two-minute lengths (the latter running in approximate quarter-hour intervals). In addition, the LDL's observation summary feature was concurrently removed, although local ad crawls were retained. Cable affiliates had the ability to select up to five specialty packages (some of which were seasonal with no set date for their inclusion in the playlist, as they were manually added and removed by STAR technicians) to be displayed along with the default "Core Package" and any additional routine local product packages. The number of product packages were pared down (from 16 to 12) and rudimentary observation summaries were restored (along with the addition of a similarly condensed forecast summary) in the form of an Upper Display Line (UDL) in February 2003, as part of a graphical revamp coinciding with the introduction of the original Weatherscan IntelliStar units.

On September 27, 2005 (as early as September 22 for areas of the Southeastern US in the path of Hurricane Rita), the Upper and Lower Display Lines were replaced by a multi-panel "L-bar" datascreen (containing a persistent network ID and the current date and time on the upper left, current observations on the middle left, and a compact radar loop screen and the provider's logo or sponsorship tags on the bottom left of the vertical sidebar; and a panel showing the descriptive 48-hour and graphical daypart and five-day forecasts, and separate crawls for local ads, and observations and forecasts for major regional cities and airports on the bottom right two-thirds), confining the main panel (with slight modifications to the 2003 faux-letterbox graphics set, and accompanied by a permanent segment rundown bar) to a smaller but prominent window at the upper middle of the screen.

=== Routine products ===
- ^{WS} Indicates product is featured on all Weatherscan-customized STAR systems.
- ^{XL} Indicates product is featured on Weatherscan-customized WeatherStar XL systems.
- ^{IS} Indicates product is featured on Weatherscan-customized IntelliStar systems.
- ^{†} Indicates product originated on The Weather Channel's domestic STAR units.

| Segment | Package(s) included | Years active | Description |
|---|---|---|---|
| Current Conditions^{WS, †} | Core, Mini-Core, Extra Local Area, Spanish | 1999–2022 | Detailed summary of current weather observations for the local area, consisting of sky condition; actual and apparent temperature (heat index or wind chill values when applicable), and other pertinent data (wind speed/direction/gusts; dew point (1999–2000 and 2003–2022); barometric pressure; humidity; cloud ceiling (1999–2000) and visibility (1999–2000)). |
| Local Observations^{WS, †} | Core, Mini-Core, Extra Local Area, Spanish | 1999–2022 | Text- and icon-based summary outlining current temperatures, weather conditions, and wind speed/direction at up to eight nearby locations near—or sometimes, including—the primary observation site. Unlike the domestic IntelliStar iteration, the WeatherScan IntelliStar units did not receive a map-based version of this product. |
| Regional Conditions^{WS, †} | Core | 1999–2000 | Map-based summary of current temperature and sky conditions for seven to ten regional cities within a 200-mile (320 km) radius of the STAR's headend location. |
| 36-Hour/48-Hour Text Forecast^{WS, †} | Core, Mini-Core, Extra Local Area | 1999–2022 | Multi-page text product describing the forecasted weather conditions, temperature, wind and, when applicable, precipitation probabilities and amounts for each corresponding period over the next 48 hours (originally 36 hours from March 31, 1999, to February 16, 2005); the segment (which mainly covered the primary forecast area, but also featured on an alternating basis for certain surrounding cities covered under the Extra Local Area package) was updated usually around 3:00 a.m. or 3:00 p.m., with intermediate updates occurring when applicable. The forecasts were sourced from the National Weather Service's local Zone Forecast Products until November 2001, and by The Weather Channel thereafter (the transition to in-house forecasts on Weatherscan took place months prior to the switchover on the domestic STAR units), allowing for more specific temperature and wind speed values and custom references to hazardous weather conditions. (Note: Temperature descriptions in NWS Zone Forecast Products are described as a generalized range, as they cover individual jurisdictions rather than specific cities.) Unlike the domestic IntelliStar units, the descriptive forecasts never received a graphical or icon-based illustration of the expected sky condition. |
| Daypart Forecast^{IS} | Mini-Core, Extra Local Area | 2003–2022 | Outlined the forecasted weather conditions, temperatures (temperature progression over the timeframe was indicated by bar graphs accompanying the numerical values), and wind speed/direction over a 12-hour period; the product was updated at the first hour specified (usually spread out in two- to three-hour intervals) in the graph. |
| Extended Forecast^{WS, †} | Core, Mini-Core, Extra Local Area, Spanish | 1999–2022 | Originally provided forecasts for the three-day period (showing icons and text descriptions indicating the forecasted sky condition, and expected high and low temperatures) starting the day after the conclusion of the 36-hour period covered by the descriptive forecast (if shown on a Saturday, for example, the forecast period would run from Tuesday through Thursday); beginning in March 2000 on the WeatherStar XL, the extended forecast timeline was increased to five days (starting with the current or, when updated during the late afternoon hours, following day). |
| Almanac^{WS, †} | Core, Mini-Core, Spanish | 1999–2022 | Originally formatted as an astronomical almanac (featuring only sunrise and sunset times for the next two days, and moon phase data for the local area) derived from the domestic STAR iteration, the product was revised in February 2003 to incorporate temperature averages and records for the current date for the nearest reporting site. (The sun and moon data was calculated by and permanently stored in the STAR units.) |
| Local Doppler Radar^{WS, †} | Core, Mini-Core, Extra Local Area | 1999–2022 | A continuous loop of National Weather Service NEXRAD radar imagery compiled over the course of three hours (originally two hours until 2001), covering a 125-mile (201 km) radius of the STAR's headend location. Coinciding with the feature's addition to domestic IntelliStar units, the product's color table was revised on January 23, 2007, to detect different precipitation types (rain/ground clutter, snow and mixed precipitation) among the radar returns. Normally running 20 seconds within the Core and Mini-Core packages, a separate one-minute standalone radar segment was added in July 2005. |
| Radar/Satellite^{IS} | Core, Mini-Core | 2003–2022 | A regional composite of visible satellite and radar data, showing the movement of weather systems and precipitation over a five-hour period; this product often alternated with the Local Doppler Radar during the Core and Mini-Core playlists. |
| Regional Doppler^{XL} | Core | 2000–2003 | A 20-second continuous regional loop of National Weather Service NEXRAD composite radar imagery over a five-hour period. |
| Regional Satellite^{XL} | Core | 2000–2003 | A 20-second continuous loop of geocolor visible satellite imagery, showing the movement of weather systems within the region over a ten-hour period. |
| Weather Bulletins^{WS} | Core, Mini-Core, Extra Local Area, Spanish | 2002–2022 | Introduced in April 2002 on the WeatherStar XL, this product featured a summary of National Weather Service-issued watches, warnings and/or advisories in effect for the local area, listed by alert type and time/date of expiration. (Tornado and severe thunderstorm warnings were shown exclusively on the lower-third alert crawl.) |
| Severe Weather Update^{WS} | Specialty | 2000–2022 | An emergency playlist, which began at the next playlist cycle following the issuance of a warning (limited to tornado, severe thunderstorm or flash flood warnings) affecting the area and ran until the warning expired (or one hour after issuance for warnings exceeding that length), during which most regular segments (specifically the Extra Local Area and applicable specialty packages) were suspended. The severe playlist—primarily utilizing a distinct gray and red graphics scheme from 2003 to 2022—began with a special "Severe Weather Message" introductory screen (appearing every three cycles), accompanied by either of the following playlists: Standard severe playlist (2000–2005), primarily features a rotating loop of the Core and Mini-Core product packages (originally the latter package exclusively until 2003): Weather Bulletin (2003–2005); Current Conditions (2000–2005); Local Observations (2003–2005); Local Doppler Radar (2000–2005, alternated with the Radar/Satellite product); Radar/Satellite (2003–2005, alternated with the Local Doppler Radar product); 36-Hour/48-Hour Text Forecast (2000–2005); Daypart Forecast (2003–2005, alternated with the Text Forecast from 2003 to 2005); Extended Forecast (2000–2005); Almanac (2003–2005); All Radar playlist (2000–2022, optional until February 16, 2005): Weather Bulletin (2003–2022); Local Doppler Radar (2000–2022); For the duration of the All Radar playlist, other routine forecast products were limited to the rudimentary Upper Display LIne summary (2003–2005) or the L-bar datascreen (2005–2022); during the datascreen's existence, an expansion of the current observation data (with other pertinent data below the sky icon and temperature appearing in a two-page format, instead of cycling between variables) replaced the radar loop at the bottom right for the duration of the severe playlist. |

=== Specialty packages ===
| Package Title | Years active | Description | Featured products |
|---|---|---|---|
| Traffic Report | 1999–2000, 2005–2010 | Originally offered as part of the short-lived Weatherscan Plus Traffic service, Weatherscan primarily offered a package of traffic products provided by Traffic Pulse for large and mid-sized metropolitan areas nationwide (utilizing data gathered in real time from intelligent transportation systems operated by state departments of transportation) from May 2005 to December 8, 2010. | Traffic Overview (1999–2000, 2005–2010) – map-based product highlighting current traffic flow on area roadways (reported congestion over specific stretches of roadway were delineated by color: green for "clear" or limited to no congestion, yellow for moderate congestion, red for heavy congestion, and gray indicating no reportable congestion data); Traffic Report (1999–2000, 2005–2010) – text-based summary of active traffic accidents, and current or scheduled construction on area roads (incidents were indicated by level of impact to commuters: green for "low", yellow for "medium" and red for "high impact"); Traffic Flow (2005–2010) – summary of average current speeds (in mph) and estimated trip time (in minutes) for three specified inbound or outbound stretches of area highways (incident impact levels, as identified in the Traffic Report product, are shown where average speeds are not listed) |
| Airport Conditions | 2000–2022 | Optional package intended for air travelers. | Local Airport Conditions – summarized current weather conditions, and flight arrival and departure delays (sourced from the Federal Aviation Administration until May 13, 2016, and by FlightAware thereafter) for up to four major airports within the headend's service area; National Airport Conditions (Airport Delays) – a summary of current weather and average delays for up to 16 (originally eight until 2003) major U.S. airports |
| Aviation | 2000–2003 | Optional package intended for aviation purposes. | Airport Conditions – map-based geocolor infrared satellite product featuring an overlay of current visual flight rules conditions at national airports (airports where visual meteorological conditions are operating under modified VFR regulations were indicated by blue boxes and those operating under instrument flight rules were indicated by red boxes); Jet Stream – map-based product outlines the present orientation of the northern and, when applicable, southern branches of the jet stream around North America; Winds – contour-based map products outlining current sustained wind speeds (of 40 knots (46 mph) or greater, accompanied by directional isotherms) at the 5,000 ft., 10,000 ft. and 34,000 ft. atmospheric levels |
| Travel Forecast | 1999–2022 | Optional package intended for business and leisure travelers. | Travel Weather – national forecast map outlining areas of rain, ice/sleet, snow and mixed precipitation forecast to occur through the upcoming daypart (updated daily at around 4:00 a.m. and 6:00 p.m. or occasionally 10:00 a.m. ET, with the valid forecast period lasting through mid-morning, midday or midnight of the corresponding day); Foggy Travel (1999–2003) – national forecast map outlining areas of fog currently observed or forecast to occur through the upcoming daypart (updated daily at 5:00 a.m. and 7:00 p.m. ET); Thunderstorm Forecast (1999–2003) – national forecast map outlining areas of general (orange) and severe (red) thunderstorm activity forecast to occur through the upcoming daypart (updated daily at around 4:00 a.m. and 6:00 p.m. or occasionally 10:00 a.m. ET, with the valid forecast period lasting through mid-morning, midday or midnight of the corresponding day); Windy Travel (1999–2003) – national forecast map outlining areas of high sustained or gusty winds (of 30 miles per hour (48 km/h) or greater) forecast to occur through the upcoming daypart (updated daily at around 4:00 a.m. and 6:00 p.m. or occasionally 10:00 a.m. ET, with the valid forecast period lasting through mid-morning, midday or midnight of the corresponding day); Regional Forecast (2003–2022) – map-based observation product (based on the product originated on TWC's domestic STAR units) summarizing forecasted temperatures and weather conditions over a two-day period for five to nine regional cities within a 500-mile (800 km) radius; originally available as a standalone product (based on the version featured on TWC's domestic STAR units) from 1999 to 2000, focusing on the current or next-day's weather for areas within a 200-mile (320 km) radius; Destination Forecasts (2003–2022) – summarized three-day "at a glance" forecasts (showing sky conditions, and expected high and low temperatures) for nine selected major U.S. cities |
| International Forecasts | 1999–2022 | Summary of forecasted weather conditions and temperatures for selected world cities. | The product was presented in two formats throughout its existence: 2000–2003: map-based daily forecasts for major cities in Europe, Mexico, South America, Southeast Asia (including Australia and New Zealand), Canada, Africa, Australia, China and Japan (including Hong Kong, Taiwan and South Korea), India, the United Kingdom and the Caribbean; (Note: Cable affiliates that opted for the package were required to choose a minimum of six of the 11 frames featured in the package, and had the option to decline selected frames.); 2003–2022: Summarized three-day "at a glance" forecasts (showing sky conditions, and expected high and low temperatures) for up to nine world cities |
| (Weather & Your) Health | 2000–2022 | Optional package featuring health-related forecasts for the area (including allergy and flu reports, ultraviolet index, air quality and safety information). | Outdoor Activity Forecast (2003–2022) – daily forecast summary of expected temperatures, precipitation probabilities, humidity and winds for outdoor recreation purposes (updated daily at 5:00 p.m. and 12:00 a.m. ET); Tree Pollen Index (1999–2003) – regional contour-based map product outlining areas of expected tree pollen activity (updated daily at 3:00 p.m. ET between March 22 and June 30); Mold Spore Index (1999–2003) – regional contour-based map product outlining areas of expected mold spore activity (updated daily at 3:00 p.m. ET between March 22 and October 31); Grass Pollen Index (1999–2003) – regional contour-based map product outlining areas of expected grass pollen activity (updated daily at 3:00 p.m. ET between May 15 and August 31); Ragweed Index (1999–2003) – regional contour-based map product outlining areas of expected ragweed pollen activity (updated daily at 3:00 p.m. ET between August 1 and October 31); Pain Index (1999–2003) – seasonal contour-based map product based on calculations of overall conditions that may influence the potential of persons susceptible to musco-skeletal aches and pains to experience symptoms (updated daily at 3:00 p.m. ET between October 22 and April 30); Respiratory Index (1999–2003) – seasonal contour-based map product based on calculations of overall conditions (not factoring air quality or pollen count) that may influence potential difficulties for persons with respiratory issues (updated daily at 3:00 p.m. ET between October 22 and April 30); Influenza Reports (1999–2003) – regional map-based product (updated weekly during the late fall and winter months) outlining influenza reports by state compiled by the Centers for Disease Control, illustrated by categorical severity (sporadic, regional or widespread); Ultraviolet Index (2002–2022) – graph-based product outlining the current UV index for the local area and forecasted daytime UV index values over the next 24 hours; originally introduced as part of The Weather Channel's Rays Awareness sun safety initiative; Allergy Report (2003–2022) – graph-based report of tree, grass and ragweed pollen, and mold spore levels (indicated by a triangle positioned on a color contour bar); Health Forecast (2003–2022) – graph-based product outlining Aches and Pains and Respiratory Index values for the local area (indicated by a triangle positioned on a color contour bar); Air Quality Forecast (2003–2022) – daily air quality index product measuring forecast air pollution values for the local area (based on the Environmental Protection Agency's AQI scale, measured using a color-coded bar graph with arrows to indicate the rating: green for "Good," yellow for "Moderate," orange for "Unhealthy for Sensitive Groups," red for "Unhealthy," and maroon for "Very Unhealthy") and the main contributing pollutant (such as ozone or fine particles); Weather Safety Tips (2002–2022) – text-based slide product illustrating safety information relevant to the current season; originally created as part of The Weather Channel's Rays Awareness sun safety initiative, this product was expanded with the 2005 creation of TWC's WeatherReady initiative to include tips on how to stay safe during severe weather, winter storms and extreme heat. |
| Golf Forecast (seasonal) | 1999–2022 | Optional package intended for planning golfing activities. | Golf Course Forecast – three-day forecasts (originally five days from 2000 to 2003) for up to four area golf courses; a golf index was incorporated into the product in 2003; Golf Resort Forecast – three-day forecasts (originally five days until 2003) for up to four area golf resorts within a 125-mile (201 km) radius of the STAR's headend location; a golf index forecast scale was incorporated into the product in 2003; Precipitation Forecast (1999–2003) – contour-based forecast map of expected precipitation amounts (of .01 inches (0.25 mm) or greater) around the region over the next 12 hours; Forecast Winds (1999–2003) – contour-based forecast map of expected sustained wind speeds or gusts (of 10 miles per hour (16 km/h) or greater) around the region over the next 12 hours; Forecast Wind Chill (1999–2003) – contour-based map product (shown mainly during the summer months) outlining categorical wind chill values around the region over the next day; Forecast Heat Index (1999–2003) – contour-based map product (shown mainly during the summer months) outlining categorical heat index values around the region over the next day; Golf Index Forecast (2003–2022) – contour-based map product gauging overall conditions ideal for golfing, showing values (from 0 for "very poor" to 10 for "excellent") for major cities across the region; Tee Time Forecast (2003–2022) – daily forecast product (similar to the Daypart Forecast) outlining expected golfing conditions for the local area over the course of 10 hours (each time interval, between 6:00 a.m. and 8:00 p.m. local time, was separated by two hours), weather conditions, temperatures (using bar graphs to show temperature progression) and wind. |
| Garden (seasonal) | 1999–2022 | Optional package including forecasts tailored toward gardening interests. | Planting Calendar – contour-based national map (available from April through early June) outlining areas where, based on ongoing conditions, certain varieties of flowers and vegetables are suitable for planting; Date of Last Freeze (Average Last Freeze) (1999–2003) – contour-based national map (available from March to May) showing the statistical last freeze in each region by average date; Frost/Freeze Warning (1999–2003, 2016–2022) – regional map outlining areas under Frost Advisories and Freeze Warnings issued by the National Weather Service; Estimated Precipitation – map-based product detailing estimated precipitation amounts reported around the region since 7:00 a.m. ET; Precipitation Forecast – map-based forecast of expected precipitation amounts (of .01 inches (0.25 mm) or greater) around the region over the next 12 hours; Gardening Forecast (2003–2022) – daily forecast summary of expected temperatures, precipitation probabilities, estimated cloud coverage (by percentage) and a "watering needs index" gauging the forecast's impact on the necessity to water lawns and gardens (updated daily at 5:00 p.m. and 12:00 a.m. ET); Palmer Drought Severity/Drought Monitor (2003–2022) – regional map (updated weekly, utilizing the National Oceanic and Atmospheric Administration (NOAA)'s Palmer drought index until May 13, 2016, and TWC's in-house Drought Monitor product thereafter) showing areal extent and severity of drought incidents |
| Boat & Beach (seasonal) | 1999–2022 | Optional package providing forecasts for boaters and beachgoers. | Boating Forecast (1999–2003) – five-day forecasts for up to four area lakes; Coastal Waters Marine Forecast – National Weather Service-issued descriptive marine forecasts for coastal locations, detailing expected winds (measured in knots) and wave heights (measured in feet); marine warnings in effect for area waters up to 5 miles (8.0 km) from the coast were also outlined; Coastal Wind Forecast (1999–2003) – contour-based regional map outlining forecast sustained wind speeds or gusts (of 10 miles per hour (8.7 kn) or greater) in marine water bodies and adjacent coastal areas; Coastal Water Temps – contour-based regional map outlining current buoy-observed water temperatures (of 30 °F (−1 °C) or greater) in marine water bodies and adjacent coastal areas; UV Outlook Index (1999–2003) – map-based product outlining contours of forecast UV index values around the region; Tides – summary of high and low tide times for the next two days for two coastal locations, and sunrise and sunset times for the current or following day; available only in coastal areas; Current Surf Report – summary of buoy current observations for a specified surf point, detailing current winds, wave periods (measured in seconds), surface water temperatures and average wave heights (measured in feet); available only in coastal areas |
| Ski & Snow (seasonal) | 1999–2022 | Optional package providing snowfall forecasts, and current snowfall information and forecasts for skiing resorts. | Ski Resort Conditions – summary of skiing conditions—featuring new snow accumulation, present base snowpack and snow density information—for up to 12 (originally six until 2003) selected skiing resorts around the region; Snowfall Forecast – contour-based regional map showing forecast snowfall amounts (of 1 inch (25 mm) or greater) over the next 12 hours; Forecast Wind Chills (1999–2003) – contour-based regional map (available from November 1 to April 30, and updated daily at 3:00 p.m. ET) showing forecast wind chill values over the next 24 hours; 5-day Ski Outlook (1999–2003) – five-day forecasts for up to four regional ski resorts |
| Summer Outdoor Activities (seasonal) | 2000–2003 | Optional observation and precipitation forecast package intended for planning outdoor activities during the summer months. | Current Temperatures – contour-based map product showing current temperatures for major cities around the region; Current Dew Points – contour-based map product showing current dew point values for major cities around the region (dew point temperature contours appear only where values are 50 °F (10 °C) or greater); Current Heat Index – contour-based map product showing current heat index values for major cities around the region; Current Winds – contour-based map product showing current sustained wind speeds around the region (speed contours appear only where sustained winds are 10 miles per hour (16 km/h) or greater; observed wind gusts are plotted in miles per hour); Estimated Precipitation – map-based product detailing estimated precipitation amounts reported around the region since 7:00 a.m. ET |
| Winter Outdoor Activities (seasonal) | 2000–2003 | Optional current conditions package intended for planning outdoor activities during the winter months. | Current Temperatures – contour-based map product showing current temperatures for major cities around the region; Current Wind Chills – contour-based map product showing current wind chill values for major cities around the region (wind chill contours and plots appear only where values are 39 °F (4 °C) or below); Current Winds – contour-based map product showing current sustained wind speeds around the region (speed contours appear only where sustained winds are 10 miles per hour (16 km/h) or greater; observed wind gusts are plotted in mph) |
| Fall Foliage (seasonal) | 2000–2003 | Optional package providing recent observations and statistical data on leaf color changes during the fall months. | Normal Foliage Peak – contour-based map product (available from September to November) showing the statistical peak of annual leaf color changes by average date; Fall Foliage – contour-based map product (updated weekly from September to November) showing observed leaf color changes—occurring as scheduled, or earlier or later than their statistical peak due to effects from ongoing weather conditions—within the region |

== See also ==
- Local Now
