= Local insertion =

Capability of alteration of broadcast feed

In broadcasting, local insertion (known in the United Kingdom as an opt-out) is the act or capability of a broadcast television station, radio station or cable system to insert or replace part of a network feed with content unique to the local station or system. Most often this is a station identification (required by the broadcasting authority such as the U.S. Federal Communications Commission), but is also commonly used for television or radio advertisements, or a weather or traffic report. A digital on-screen graphic ("dog" or "bug"), commonly a translucent watermark, may also be keyed (superimposed) with a television station ID over the network feed using a character generator using genlock. In cases where individual broadcast stations carry programs separate from those shown on the main network, this is known as regional variation (in the United Kingdom) or an opt-out (in Canada and the United States).

Automated local insertion used to be triggered with in-band signaling, such as DTMF tones or sub-audible sounds (such as 25 Hz), but is now done with out-of-band signaling, such as analog signal subcarriers via communications satellite, or now more commonly via digital signals. In an emergency, such as severe weather, local insertion may also occur instantly through command from another network or other source (such as the Emergency Alert System or First Warning).

== Within individual programs ==
In the United States, insertion can easily be heard every evening on the nationally syndicated radio show Delilah, where the host does a pre-recorded station-specific voiceover played over a music bed from the network. When host Delilah Rene says "this is Delilah", her voice (often in a slightly different tone or mood than what she has just been speaking) then identifies the branding or identification for the specific station (for example, "on B98.5 FM" when heard on WSB-FM in Atlanta, Georgia). Because of this slight difference in vocal quality, many syndicated radio networks suggest using only one voice for local station IDs 24/7; this way, the difference in vocal intonation is lessened. This style of insertion was pioneered in 1981 by the Satellite Music Network, a service providing live 24/7 formatted music programming to local stations that did not staff their own local disc jockeys throughout the day. The generic live comments of the national SMN hosts would be augmented by brief recorded announcements from the same DJs, scripted by the affiliate to make the programming sound more local.

Insertion is made conspicuous when, due to carelessness, or even abuse—e.g. to squeeze in one more ad—the network program is already underway by the time the insert closes. This same mode of insertion is heard during weather forecasts transmitted by outside companies such as Weatherology, where all the audio assets, including three to four days of upcoming weather, temperatures, wind direction/speed and the current conditions and possible warnings are pre-recorded, then matched together to form the audio of a full forecast.

The other more prominent example is during live sports programming carried over radio and television networks, where close to the top of the hour, a play-by-play announcer will say "we pause ten seconds for station identification; this is the (team name) (radio network branding)", or a close equivalent. On most stations, this is a basic station identification, as required by the Federal Communications Commission (FCC), with the call letters and city of license relayed, while on others a quickly-read five second advertisement or program promotion is read before the identification, or a breaking news event or weather warning occurring during the event is relayed, followed by the station ID. Due to many sports rights deals for televised sports moving to regional sports networks which are not required to identify themselves under FCC guidelines, or network sports coverage where the station is identified through an on-screen display by the local station rather than speech, this is more prominent on radio rather than television.

Local commercial (and some non-commercial) broadcast television stations also insert local commercial breaks during programming each half-hour while network-supplied or syndicated content is being broadcast. Television networks and syndication distributors give their affiliates either 60, 90 or 120 seconds each half-hour (typically totaling about four minutes per hour) to run local station breaks, including promos for the station and advertisements for national and local area businesses (and on a few stations, local news updates – which were particularly common during the 1970s through the 1990s, especially as the "24 Hour News Source" format became commonplace in the United States during the latter decade – current time and temperature information, or a brief local weather forecast), over network programming. Typically, these networks air a blank feed showing the network's logo (such as with Fox, NBC, The CW, and MyNetworkTV) or a series of public service announcements (as with ABC and CBS), while stations air local commercials. PBS member stations and other non-commercial educational stations also insert promos for network series and/or syndicated or locally produced programming during promo breaks; as these station are non-commercial, breaks are typically not featured during the programs themselves, instead promos are inserted in-between shows, even – in the case of PBS members – if the station is carrying the national network feed.

Various television morning news shows (such as Good Morning America and Today) also allocate five minutes of programming time each half-hour for stations to carry a local news update at :25 and :55 minutes past the hour; however the national feed continues for stations that do not wish to "break away", either because they do not air a morning newscast or simply do not have a news department (for example, some mid-sized and smaller market NBC affiliates, such as KTEN in Ada, Oklahoma, do not air news cut-ins during the weekend edition of Today if they do not have a weekend morning newscast, but cut-ins are shown during the weekday telecasts where Today follows a morning newscast). This also occurs with news on NPR's Morning Edition and All Things Considered, which respectively air during the morning and evening rush hours. For commercial stations in the 2020s, the news and weather update, which was traditionally 2-3 minutes in the past, now may run only as long as a condensed one minute at most, with the rest of the allocation devoted to local advertising.

Starting in the early 1990s, some cable television systems began carrying a local insert called "Local Edition", a segment featuring local news inserts (which are produced by area television stations or local cable operators) that air at :24 and :54 minutes past the hour during HLN's rolling daytime news block, usually during the network's non-essential features news block. This has been discontinued as that network has switched to a general news/talk format beginning in 2005.

== Transmitter identification ==
Translator stations may also have local insertion, though this is generally limited to identifying the repeating station's callsign and community of license separate from its parent station. In the United States, the FCC also allows up to 30 seconds each hour for fundraising to keep the translator service on the air.

== Pay television ==
Local insertion is also used by cable and telephone company television providers, in which cable and telco headends insert advertisements for the system, promotions for programs on other cable channels carried by the provider and commercials for local area businesses (such as car dealerships or furniture stores) at least twice each hour; unlike most commercial broadcast stations, however, cable channels often run only 60 seconds of local commercial inserts each half-hour near the end of the first or second commercial break and are aired in place of national ads or network promos that air during that given time. Direct-broadcast satellite services take advantage of the hard drive space on consumer digital video recorders to upload service-specific advertising and promotions localized to the customer's market area, though consumers with non-DVR units instead have default service advertising and promos.

Local insertion on cable television is used especially on The Weather Channel in the U.S. and The Weather Network/MétéoMédia in Canada, where systems like the WeatherStar, IntelliStar and PMX have been used to show regularly scheduled local weather forecasts (known as "Local on the 8s" on The Weather Channel in the U.S.), and well as the lower display line (LDL) or lower-third graphic that is shown at other times. The Weather Channel, in particular also airs ads during national breaks at the end of some advertisements allowing its WeatherSTAR or IntelliSTAR systems to insert selected locations for certain businesses operating in the area, such as restaurants or auto rental dealers; though The Weather Channel has not done this as much in recent years as they have in the past. This only applies to the cable systems, although in the U.S. direct-broadcast satellite services have shown an LDL of the current conditions and 12-hour forecast for select major cities. This is not seen on older TVRO or "big ugly dish" systems, as this is intended as a backhaul and has very few end-users, and is used as a clean feed, though some cable services which have not upgraded to the channel's HD systems may see the national overview instead while the standard definition broadcast remains localized. The Weather Channel also allows viewers through their digital media player apps on Apple TV and Roku to view their local forecast rather than the default national ticker, with the forecast details and graphics generated by the player itself.

=== Set-top boxes ===
In place of the IntelliSTAR, a hyperlocal form of insertion is now done on DirecTV and Dish, whereby the first half of the local forecast is generated at the set-top box level. A "cutout" at the upper right corner of the picture allows the sponsor's advertising logo to be shown live from the main video feed, while a datacast on the satellite (like that which provides the electronic program guide) sends simple forecast and conditions data for the entire country every couple of minutes. Graphics are stored on the receiver, and then funneled by ZIP code to display the proper local forecast to the end user.

The ATSC 3.0 over-the-air standard in the United States will have emphasis on targeted news, weather or information by ZIP code or IP geolocation, along with advertising and overall improved viewer tracking and using the station's spectrum to datacast direct to the viewer.

== See also ==
- Broadcast automation and centralcasting
- Emergency Alert System
- Station identification
