= Shake (company) =

Shake, Inc
- Company type: Private
- Website type: Legal & Productivity
- Available in: English
- Founded: 2012
- Headquarters: New York City, New York, {{{location_country}}}
- Key people: Abe Geiger, CEO; Jon Steinberg, Board Member; Stuart Ellman, Board Member; Jared Grusd, Board Member
- Website: http://shakelaw.com
- Registration: Required

Shake is a New York-based legal technology startup company. Its primary product is the Shake app, which allows individuals to create, sign and send legally binding agreements through their iOS devices. As of April 2014, the app is only available for the iPhone.

The Shake Law app includes a library of simple, plain-English legal agreements that can be executed via a mobile device. It includes a number of stock contract templates pertaining to Freelancing/Independent Contractors, Non-Disclosure Agreements, Buying and Selling, Rental of Goods, and Personal Loans. After selecting a template, a user then customizes it by answering a series of questions.

== Tiny Law ==
Shake's primary focus is on the "Tiny Law" sector, a term believed to have been coined by Shake CEO Abe Geiger at the 2014 Reinvent Law Conference. Tiny Law refers to individuals such as freelancers and small businesses that require legal services for small figure transitions and who might be traditionally reluctant to seek legal representation due to cost.

== History ==
Shake was founded in 2012. The original idea for Shake came from Jon Steinberg, president of BuzzFeed, and Jared Grusd, General Counsel for Spotify and an adjunct professor at Columbia Business School. The two men connected with RRE Ventures’ Stuart Ellman (who also teaches at Columbia) and told him about an idea they had for a business aimed at simplifying legal contracts. Ellman introduced them to Abe Geiger, a student in his Venture Capital class who was working on his own legal startup idea. The four men decided to join forces and cofound Shake with the intent on simplifying and modernizing the legal contract process.

== Business model ==
Shake is a freemium product. The app is free, but Geiger has said that they will eventually monetize by adding premium features and/or services.

== Usage ==
As of September 2013, the Shake app has been downloaded over 80,000 times and has been used to create and sign $15 million worth of legal agreements.
