= Haystack News =

OTT platform for news videos

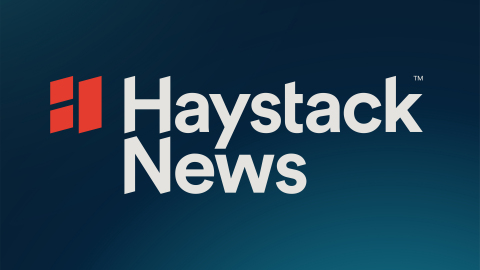
- Formerly: Haystack TV
- Industry: Media; OTT streaming
- Genre: News
- Founded: 2013
- Founder: Daniel Barreto; Ish Harshawat
- Headquarters: United States
- Area served: Worldwide
- Website: http://haystack.tv/

Haystack News (formerly Haystack TV) is a free ad-supported streaming service for local, national and international news video available on smart TVs, over-the-top platforms and mobile apps. Haystack uses data from each user—such as location, topics of interest and favorite publishers—to create a personalized playlist of short news clips. The platform also hosts live channels from local, national and international news outlets.

== History ==
The company was founded in 2013 as Haystack TV by Daniel Barreto and Ish Harshawat. The two software engineers said they both found it difficult to watch news content on TV without a cable subscription and decided to create an app to fill that void.

Barreto and Harshawat first launched the app in 2014 on iOS and Android mobile platforms with funding from Zorlu Ventures, the National Association of Broadcasters and Stanford's StartX Fund.

When Haystack News first launched, it was initially focusing on national news content but by May 2019, the company announced it was utilizing clips from more than 200 local TV stations.

In May 2020, the company rebranded from Haystack TV to Haystack News and launched an interactive news ticker on its app.

In November 2020, Haystack added live streaming news channels to its platform, competing with similar OTT news apps like NewsON and Local Now.

== Platforms ==
Haystack News is available on smart TVs manufactured by Hisense, LG, Samsung, Sony, TCL, Toshiba and Vizio; as well as OTT streaming platforms including Amazon Fire TV, Android TV, Apple TV, Chromecast and Roku. The app is also available on Android and iOS mobile devices.

By January 2022, Haystack News was the third-most downloaded news app on Roku.

== News publishers ==
While Haystack initially used content from YouTube to populate its news playlists, news organizations slowly began sharing content directly with the company under revenue-sharing agreements.

As of February 2021, more than 350 news organizations were sharing their content with Haystack News.

=== Local media groups ===
- CBS Local
- Cox Media Group
- Fox Television Stations
- Hearst Television
- Hubbard Broadcasting
- Meredith Corporation
- Morris Multimedia
- Nexstar Media Group
- The EW Scripps Company

=== U.S.-based national news outlets ===
- ABC News
- AccuWeather Network
- Associated Press
- Bloomberg News
- Cheddar
- CNET
- CNN
- FedNet
- Newsmax
- Reuters
- Scripps News
- Yahoo! News

=== International news outlets ===
- Africanews
- Al Jazeera
- CBC Television
- Deutsche Welle (DW)
- Euronews
- France 24
- i24 News

== See also ==
- Local Now
- NewsON
