= Jon Steinberg =

American businessman

Jonathan Steinberg is an American businessman, who serves as a chief executive officer of international multimedia company Future plc. In early 2016, he founded Cheddar Inc., a new media company covering tech news and culture, and served as its CEO. He is the former president and COO of tech and pop-culture website BuzzFeed.

== Early life ==
Steinberg's mother, Renee, is a teacher at a New York private School and his father, Richard, is a doctor turned real estate broker. He attended the Collegiate School and was interested in computers from an early age. When he was 15 years old, he was accepted into the Walt Disney Imagineering summer intern program. He graduated with an A.B. from the Woodrow Wilson School of Public and International Affairs at Princeton University in 1999, after completing an 122-page-long senior thesis titled "The New American Citizen: The Potential for the Internet to Re-Engage Americans in Civic and Political Life." He also holds an M.B.A. from Columbia University.

== Career ==
In May 2010, Steinberg joined BuzzFeed while it was still a 15-person company. He played a role in helping develop Buzzfeed's business model, which is rooted in content marketing. Prior to Buzzfeed, Steinberg was strategic partner development manager on Google's small medium business partnerships team, executive in residence at Polaris Venture Partners, and founded iBuilding, a commercial real estate software company.

In 2012, Steinberg was named an Ad Age Media Maven. In 2013, he joined the board of Legal Mobile App startup, Shake.

In June 2014, Steinberg became chief executive officer of DailyMail.com North America.

On February 22, 2023, it was announced that Future plc CEO Zillah Byng-Thorne would resign on April 3, with Steinberg assuming the role of CEO.

== Cheddar ==
In early 2016, Steinberg founded Cheddar Inc., a new media company covering tech news and culture, and served as its CEO. In September 2016, Cheddar received $10 million in funding from Comcast and other investors.

Cheddar is a live and on-demand video news network, and broadcasts weekdays from the floor of the New York Stock Exchange, Nasdaq MarketSite, and the Flatiron Building. By mid-2016, the company had added a CheddarLife program, and was broadcasting on Facebook Live, Roku and SiriusXM.

In addition to co-hosting the original Cheddar program with business journalist Kristen Scholer, Steinberg sits on the board of Bustle.com and is an advisor to The Skimm and Taboola.

In April 2019, Altice announced that it was acquiring Cheddar for $200 million. Steinberg remained as president of the news division.

== Personal life ==
As of 2013, Steinberg has lived on the Upper East Side of New York City with his wife, Jill, and his children, Cooper and Edie.
