= NewsON =

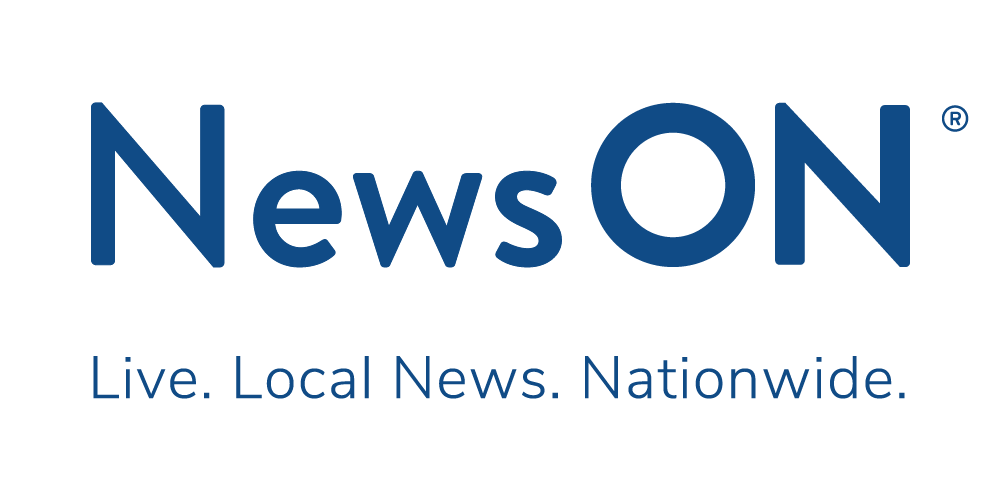
- Broadcast area: United States

Links
- Website: https://newson.us

NewsON is a local news service that enables users to see live and on demand local news broadcasts and video clips from TV stations across the United States. As of February 2021, NewsON includes over 275 TV stations from over 160 markets, covering more than 75% of the US population.

The app is available on mobile phones, tablets and connected TVs, including iPhones, iPads, Android phones, Android tablets, Roku connected TV devices, Fire TV and Apple TV. NewsON also offers a streaming website.

NewsON was announced on June 9, 2015, as a venture formed by five of the largest TV station groups in the United States. The founding members were ABC Owned Television Stations, Cox Media Group, Hearst Television, Media General, and Raycom Media. Hubbard Broadcasting announced its participation as an investor in November 2015, Sinclair Broadcast Group announced its investment in January 2016, and Nexstar Broadcasting Group (now Nexstar Media Group) announced its investment in April 2016.

Current participating station groups are Berkshire Hathaway, Block Communications, Capitol Broadcasting Company, CBS News and Stations, Cowles Company, Cox Media Group, E. W. Scripps Company, Fort Myers Broadcasting Company, Forum Communications, Hearst Television, Heritage Broadcasting Company, Hubbard Broadcasting, Morgan Murphy Media, News-Press & Gazette Company, Paxton Media Group, Sinclair Broadcast Group and Tegna Inc.

The service launched to the public on November 4, 2015, on iOS, Android, and Roku. Viewers can share what they've seen on social media platforms such as Facebook or Twitter.

On January 1, 2020, ABC Owned Television Stations removed their eight stations from the service.

In November 2021, Gray Television removed their stations from NewsON in favor of Zeam (formerly known as VUit).

== See also ==
- Haystack News
- Local Now
