= WeatherStar =

Computerized units used to generate local weather information over The Weather Channel

WeatherStar (sometimes rendered Weather Star or WeatherSTAR; "STAR" being an acronym for Satellite Transponder Addressable Receiver) is the technology used by American cable and satellite television network The Weather Channel (TWC) to generate its local forecast segments—branded as Local on the 8s (LOT8s) since 2002 and previously from 1996 to 1998—on cable and IPTV systems nationwide. The hardware takes the form of a computerized unit installed at a cable system's headend. It receives, generates, and inserts local forecasts and other weather information, including weather advisories and warnings, into TWC's national programming.

== Overview ==
The primary purpose of WeatherStar units is to disseminate weather information for local forecast segments on The Weather Channel. The forecast and observation data – which is compiled from local offices of the National Weather Service (NWS), the Storm Prediction Center (SPC), and The Weather Channel (which began producing in-house forecasts in 2002, replacing the NWS-sourced zone forecasts that were utilized for the STAR's descriptive, regional and extended forecast products) – is received from the vertical blanking interval of the TWC video feed and from data transmitted via satellite; the localized data is then sent to the unit that inserts the data and accompanying programmed graphics over the TWC feed.

The WeatherStar systems are typically programmed to cue the local forecast segments and Lower Display Line (LDL) at given times. The units are programmed to feature customized segments known as "flavors", pre-determined segment lengths for each local forecast segment, varying by the time of broadcast, accommodating the inclusion or exclusion of certain products from a segment's product list. (Until the Local on the 8s segments adopted a uniform length, the extended forecast was the only product regularly included in each flavor.) Flavor lengths previously varied commonly between 30 seconds and two minutes, with some running as long as six minutes during the late 1980s and the mid-1990s; in April 2013, the LOT8s segment flavor switched permanently to a uniform one-minute length.

Outside of the regularly scheduled full-screen graphical segments, weather data is also inserted over the channel's national feed via the Lower Display Line; the LDL was originally displayed as a text-only overlay over the bottom third of the video feed on older STAR units up to the Weather Star Jr. model, containing no graphical background and only showing current weather observations and monthly precipitation totals for the chosen reporting station. (The text-based LDL was discontinued on active pre-1998 STAR units on March 11, 2010, coinciding with The Weather Channel permanently adding a version of the LDL for the network's national clean feed.) With the release of the Weather Star XL, the LDL was modified to include short-term daypart (and, later three-day) forecasts for the STAR's home location as well as a semi-translucent background; the later release of the IntelliStar saw the incorporation of additional products into the LDL, including air quality indexes, travel forecasts for three major cities in the region, traffic information and almanac data.

The IntelliStar units' LDL was redesigned on November 12, 2013, expanding it to be displayed throughout all programming on the national feed (including commercial breaks and telecasts of its long-form programs, but not during local ad breaks inserted at the provider level); the LDL was replaced by a rundown/progress bar during the full-screen LOT8s segments, indicating the time remaining for the product currently playing and up to two forecast products scheduled to be played afterwards. A sidebar, which was shown only during the channel's forecast programming and was removed during commercial breaks, was also added and paired with the LDL on the right third of the screen over the channel's high definition simulcast feed and displayed supplementary observation data (including visibility, dew point and barometric pressure data that was previously shown on the LDL), average flight delay times for area airports, air quality forecasts, and historical almanac data.

All STAR systems are able to display watches, warnings and advisories issued by the National Weather Service and the Storm Prediction Center for the immediate area where the WeatherStar system's headend is based, which generate a tone as an audible leader to the alert message. Older STAR units up to the WeatherStar 4000 displayed NWS bulletins in the form of a full-screen vertical scroll with differing-colored backgrounds (brown for advisories and red for warnings), which was paired with the Lower Display Line.

However, the 4000 introduced a horizontal ticker that was restricted to the bottom third of the TWC video feed; since November 12, 2013, IntelliStar models now display alerts over the national feed's headlines ticker placed above the LDL. The systems are also capable of generating multiple scrolling text advertisements that appear at the bottom of the screen during local forecast segments, which are programmed into the administrative menus by a local provider-employed technician. STAR units are also capable of generating advertising tags for overlay on national advertisements seen on the national feed, displaying localized addresses for retailers, and on newer models, tagging products seen during breaks (such as pollen reports).

The Weather Channel provides its STAR units to cable and IPTV providers free of charge. Programming and maintenance of all units is handled by engineers employed by each provider, who are able to modify specifications to generate locally specific weather data, program locally specific greetings for LOT8s segment introductions, generate test alerts viewable only by cable company technicians performing silent remote administration tests, and make upgrades and repairs to the unit's software and hardware. Although extremely rare, the programmability of STAR units at the headend level can leave systems vulnerable to possible tampering.

One such instance occurred over Mediacom’s Des Moines, Iowa system on July 21, 2022, when the introductory message to a LOT8s segment displayed a racial slur that was tacked onto a default greeting used to open the segment (one of several programmed into all IntelliStar units that are usually modified only to reference the municipality of the STAR unit). TWC parent Allen Media Group (owned and overseen by Black media entrepreneur Byron Allen, and which acquired TWC from a consortium of NBCUniversal, Blackstone and Bain Capital in 2018) stated it would investigate the source of the message, which originated within Mediacom's local headend operations.

== History ==
Since its introduction at TWC's launch in May 1982, several generations of the WeatherStar have been used. As of 2015, two STAR models (the IntelliStar 2xD and IntelliStar 2 Jr.) are currently being used by cable and IPTV providers for generation of local weather information on the channel. Some providers only use one STAR model, the IntelliStar 2xD, as it has capabilities to output in 720x480 letterboxed SD with 1920x1080 HD.

=== Weather Star I ===
The original WeatherStar system, the Weather Star I, was released upon The Weather Channel's launch. Like subsequent WeatherStar units, it received local weather data from TWC and the National Weather Service, via data encoded in the vertical blanking interval of TWC's video feed, as well as receiving extra data from a subcarrier transmitted above TWC's video and audio signals on its transponder on satellite. The Weather Star I was manufactured and developed for TWC by Salt Lake City, Utah-based Compuvid. A couple of years before TWC was founded, Compuvid had already made a similar product which was installed at the headends of cable television systems owned by TeleCable Corporation, a subsidiary of Landmark Communications, TWC's corporate parent at the time and the channel's founding owner. This system displayed weather conditions, forecasts and announcements via a set of weather sensors locally installed at the cable headend. The Weather Star I was an updated version of this unit, receiving data from both The Weather Channel and the National Weather Service.

The Weather Star I, like its two subsequent successors, lacked the ability to generate graphics and was only capable of displaying white text on various backgrounds: purple for the "Latest Observations" (which displayed current weather conditions for the nearest reporting station and others within a 75 miles (121 km) radius of the headend location) and "Weather Information" (which displayed random data, usually weather-related trivia, past weather events in the area, or information on upcoming programming) pages, grey for the "36 Hour Forecast" page (a descriptive forecast using the National Weather Service's zone forecast products), brown for scrolling weather advisories, and red for scrolling weather warnings. Until the release of the Weather Star III, The Weather Channel used a single one-minute local forecast sequence featuring each of the three above-mentioned forecast screens. As with all future WeatherStar models, the Weather Star I could key its text over TWC's national video feed, most often to display the current conditions at the bottom of the screen.

Even though the Weather Star I met the Federal Communications Commission's Part 15 regulations for emanated RF interference (RFI), it still radiated enough to interfere with VHF channel 2 on the broadcast band, resulting in problems at the cable television system's headend where the Weather Star I unit was installed. This problem was temporarily solved by having ferrite chokes attached to all cables and wires attached to the Weather Star. The Weather Star I was also notorious for frequent text jamming and text garbling issues.

=== Weather Star II ===
The Weather Star II was released in 1984; the unit had improved RF shielding to reduce interference issues and had an improved overall hardware design. Otherwise, the unit was similar in its features to the Weather Star I.

=== Weather Star III ===
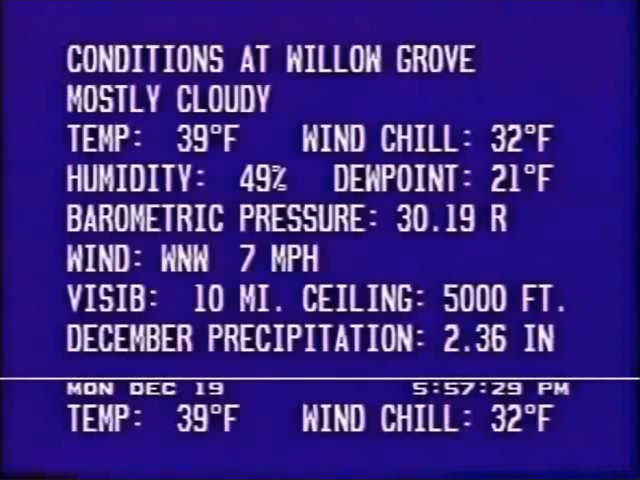
Capture from a WeatherStar III unit, showing conditions for Willow Grove, Pennsylvania.

The Weather Star III, released in 1986 as an upgrade to the Weather Star II, was another text-only unit that was essentially identical to the two prior WeatherStar models, though with additional internal improvements and forecast products (and consequently, more local forecast sequences). However, TWC decided to drop one of the products included in the unit, "Weather Information," soon after the introduction of the STAR III.

In 2001, the FCC granted The Weather Channel a waiver from complying with its forthcoming requirement for aural tones to accompany broadcast of "scrolled" or "crawled" emergency information, which otherwise went into effect in 2002, for the Weather Star Jr. and Weather Star III. The Weather Star III was capable of generating an aural tone only during the first display of a weather warning, not every time it was shown, as required by the regulations. The waiver, which expired on December 31, 2004, was granted with the understanding that TWC would "replace the Star IIIs in 2003/2004". TWC released an "Audio Weather Alert Enhancement" for the Weather Star Jr. and Weather Star III in June 2004, so that they would emit "a series of audible beeps" every time a tornado warning, flash flood warning or severe thunderstorm warning issued by the National Weather Service was transmitted for insertion over the TWC feed.

The Weather Star III was retired completely in December 2004. From 1989 to 1992, The Weather Network and its French language sister network MétéoMédia – the Canadian equivalents of TWC – used the Weather Star III units to display local forecasts, which were displayed over a sky-blue background, a colour that TWC's units did not use.

=== WeatherStar 4000 ===
The Weather Star 4000 was the first WeatherStar model capable of displaying graphics. First developed in 1988, it was introduced in early 1990. It was designed and manufactured by Canadian electronics company Applied Microelectronics Institute (now Amirix).

The first Star 4000s were programmed to operate in a text-only mode (displayed over stylized graphical backgrounds), similar to the STAR III, but with two improvements: an improved font was introduced, as was a graphical radar product at the end of the local forecast segment, showing precipitation that was occurring in the viewer's local geographic area. The first version was just a static (current) image. A second version was added in the fall of 1992 and was a loop showing radar data logged during the previous 90 minutes. Within a brief period of time, the Weather Star 4000 began to produce graphically based local forecast segments, including maps for the regional observation and forecast products.

Until 1995, the Star 4000 incorporated a narration track provided by Dan Chandler into the software, which introduced forecast products presented in each flavor; the tracks could be programmed to play either on certain products or all that were featured during that particular flavor. A customized version of the Weather Star 4000 was used by The Weather Network until 1997, when it switched to a technically different system to disseminate local weather information, known as PMX. Due to the cost of upgrading to more advanced units including the IntelliStar, the Weather Star 4000 remained in use in some smaller communities as late as 2014, although it was already being gradually phased out in some areas in favor of the more recent models at that time.

On June 27, 2023, The Weather Channel quietly introduced a new hour-long block called “Retro 8s LIVE,” which features a modernized high-definition version of the WeatherSTAR 4000. The block, which preceded another block introduced at the time called Twilight LIVE, cycled through major cities in the United States with weather information and accompanying narration. It aired weekday mornings at 4 AM eastern time until it was retired (along with Twilight LIVE) on November 3, 2023.

The Weather Channel released an emulator of the WeatherStar4000 on April Fools Day 2026. The Weather Channel re-released it on July 7, 2026. Other versions are online and downloadable.

=== WeatherStar Jr. ===
The Weather Star Jr. was a budget model manufactured by Wegener Communications for cable headends in smaller communities. Released in 1994 following field testing on eight cable systems in various smaller markets, the system was based on Wegener's Series 2450 graphics display platform, and cost US$500 per unit. It featured the same products used by the Star III, but utilized the typeface used by the 4000. The Weather Channel was able to upgrade Weather Star Jr. units to meet the FCC's 2002 deadline to require broadcasts of "scrolled" or "crawled" emergency information to be accompanied by an aural tone for accessibility reasons. When the change in FCC regulations forced the retirement of the Star III, headends using that unit upgraded to the Weather Star Jr. or more advanced units.

=== WeatherStar XL ===
In the fall of 1998, the Weather Star XL, the fifth-generation system in the WeatherStar fleet, was introduced. The Star XL, an IRIX-based computer unit manufactured by SGI, had significantly more advanced technical capabilities than the 4000; it incorporated modernized graphics (with Akzidenz-Grotesk as the main typeface) and a new set of weather icons that would be used on the channel for eight years after its launch. Its on-screen appearance was originally based on those used on the channel's program introductions that were introduced shortly beforehand but were eventually replaced by a graphics set that closely resembled the original graphical design of the WeatherStar's successor, the IntelliStar.

The Star XL was also the first WeatherStar platform to be adapted and modified by The Weather Channel for use on its sister service Weatherscan, a 24-hour local weather channel carried on select cable systems throughout the country (primarily on digital tiers) that launched in 1999; three years later, the Weatherscan XL units would be phased out for use on Weatherscan (and eventually, on TWC in most large and mid-sized markets) and replaced by the newer IntelliStar technology as part of the first trial of the system. The Star XL model has a high manufacturing cost (US$6,500) and weighs 55 pounds (25 kg). It was also the first STAR system to utilize Vocal Local, a software function that is technologically different from the narration track used in the WeatherStar 4000, which assembles pre-recorded audio tracks to provide narration of the current temperature and sky conditions, descriptive forecasts and introductions to certain forecast products.

The XL, along with the WeatherStar 4000 and WeatherStar Jr. systems, were retired when The Weather Channel discontinued transmission of its analog satellite feed on June 26, 2014.

=== IntelliStar ===
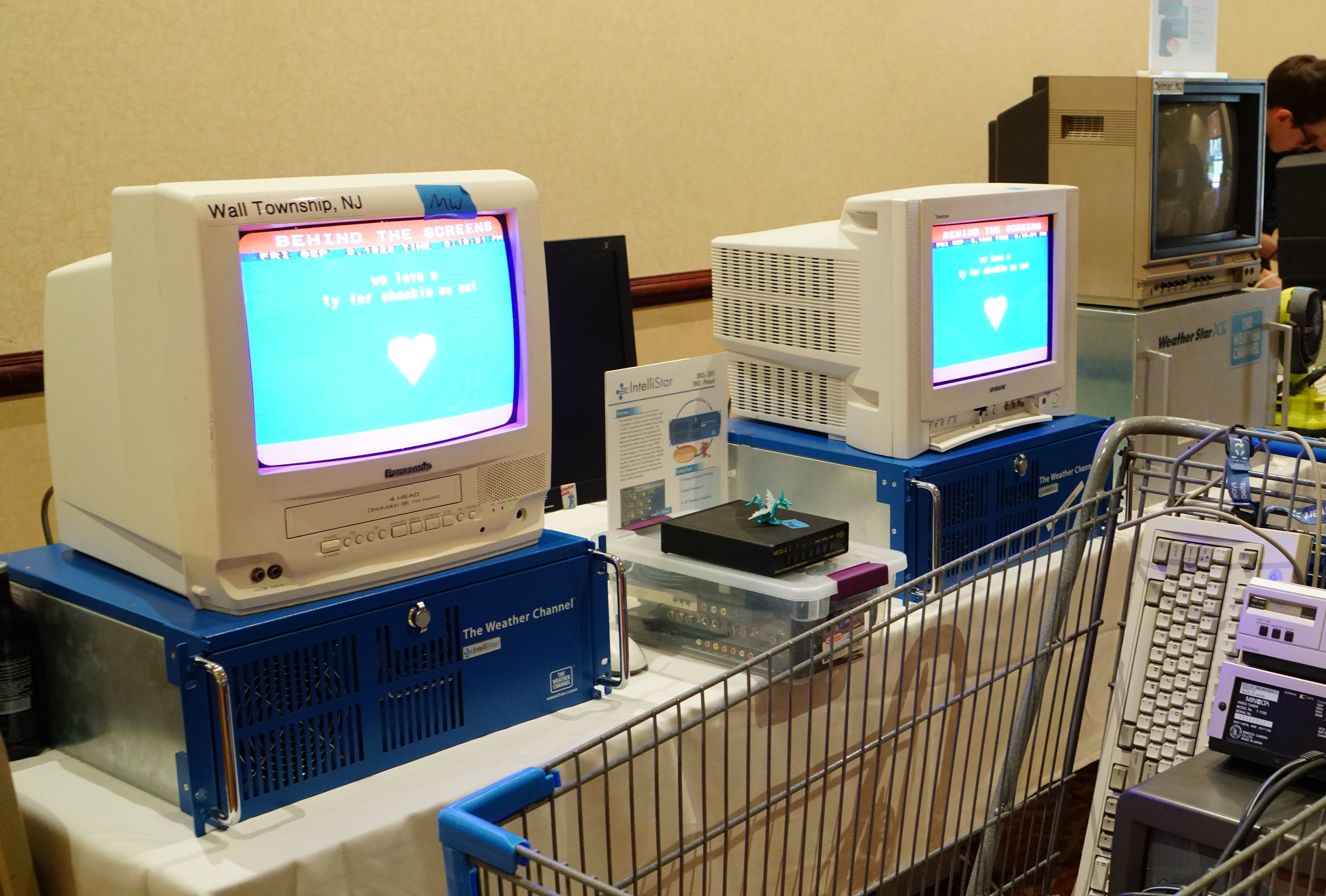
Two IntelliStar computers (oldest WeatherStar XL also visible)

In February 2003, TWC released an advanced model, IntelliStar, initially being rolled out for use on Weatherscan; the "domestic" version intended for use on The Weather Channel was subsequently introduced in early to mid-2004 in the top media markets (including Dallas, Los Angeles, Philadelphia and Pittsburgh). Initially, its graphics were essentially the same as those seen on the WeatherStar XL (though it used Interstate, which was used by TWC for its on-air graphics package at the time, as the typeface instead of Akzidenz-Grotesk) until December 2006, when the IntelliStar received its own, even more realistic icon set – which were used on TWC's on-air and online forecast content as well.

The amount of weather products provided by the IntelliStar had dramatically increased with the revamp: with the addition of school-day and outdoor activity forecasts; ultraviolet indexes and other health information; and the introduction of more localized maps for forecasts and radar/satellite imagery. However, most of the products were dropped in April 2013, when the channel uniformly reduced its local forecast segments to one minute (instead of varying between one and two minutes, depending on the segment). Some of the data added was also incorporated into the Lower Display Line, which eventually added a tabbed display for each product. Through a content agreement with Traffic Pulse, traffic information (in the form of accident and construction reports, roadway flow and average travel times for local roadways) was also presented by the IntelliStar in markets in which Traffic Pulse provided traffic data until TWC's agreement with the company expired in 2010.

The IntelliStar was officially discontinued on November 16, 2015, being replaced by the IntelliStar 2 and IntelliStar 2 Jr.

==== IntelliStar 2 ====
The IntelliStar 2 (also known internally as IntelliStar 2 HD) – is the seventh generation WeatherStar system and the first to be capable of generating forecast graphics in both widescreen and high-definition (specifically, in the channel's 1080i format). The unit originally did not feature any programmed narration, a Lower Display Line or icon animations. When the system was officially released in July 2010, many of the existing issues that were present with the ALPHA were corrected. The fully released version of the IntelliStar 2 features an animated lower display line, and various products including current weather conditions, weather bulletins, three-hour Doppler radar loops for the region and the metropolitan area, a 12-hour forecast graph, and 24-hour descriptive and seven-day forecast graphics. From its release until November 12, 2013, the IntelliStar 2 used a graphics package that differed from the original IntelliStar (before both systems implemented a uniform graphics package, the IntelliStar used graphics based on TWC's 2005 package while the IntelliStar 2 used graphics based on the channel's 2008 graphics). Vocal Local narration is done by TWC meteorologist/storm tracker Jim Cantore, instead of Allen Jackson, who provided the narration track for the first generation IntelliStar and WeatherStar XL.

The system was gradually rolled out to major U.S. cable providers strictly for use on The Weather Channel's HD simulcast feed, and originally did not replace existing operational STAR units used on The Weather Channel's standard definition feed or Weatherscan; as a result, TWC became one of the few channels which by necessity does not have an "autotune to HD" version for providers that utilize set-top boxes allowing HD tuning to standard definition channel positions.

==== IntelliStar 2 Jr. ====
The IntelliStar 2 Jr., a low-cost digital model suitable for smaller cable providers, was developed and released in 2013. Similar to the first-generation IntelliStar, the unit is capable of operating natively for both analog and digital transmission on cable systems. The Star 2 Jr. was later used as a permanent replacement for all analog WeatherStar systems on June 26, 2014, as a result of the discontinuance of the analog-only units. The IntelliStar 2 Jr. units were widely disabled via a satellite update package on October 5, 2026 which prevents local presentations from being run, aside from several units owned by Mediacom. TWC delivered an additional upgrade package which is designed to erase and shut down all active units at 12:01am local time on March 1, 2027.

==== IntelliStar 2 xD ====
The IntelliStar 2 xD is a model of the IntelliStar 2 Series that was released in late 2014 and early 2015 as a replacement of the original IntelliStar 2. It letterboxes The Weather Channel HD feed in SD and sends the full HD feed to the HD Channel. It was made as a full replacement of the IntelliStar and Intellistar 2.

== WeatherStar products ==
- ^{WS} Indicates product is featured on all STAR systems.
- ^{3000} Indicates product is featured on WeatherStar 3000.
- ^{4000} Indicates product is featured on WeatherStar 4000 systems.
- ^{XL} Indicates product is featured on WeatherStar XL systems.
- ^{IS} Indicates product is featured on IntelliStar systems.
- ^{IS2} Indicates product is featured on IntelliStar 2, IntelliStar 2 xD, and IntelliStar 2 Jr. systems.
- ^{Jr} Indicates product is featured on WeatherStar Jr.

=== Current products ===
Segment	Description
Current Conditions^{WS}	This product outlines current weather observations for the local area. The primary product details observation data for a specific location – consisting of sky condition; actual and apparent temperature (including heat index values during the spring and summer, wind chill mainly during the winter when applicable); wind speed/direction/gusts; dew point; barometric pressure; and humidity (cloud ceiling data was generated by STAR models from WeatherStar XL and earlier). Two additional observation products were used prior to April 2013: one that provided sky condition, temperature and wind data for six to eight cities within a 100-mile (160 km) radius (the number of cities varied depending on the STAR system and the number of available reporting stations) and regional sky condition and temperature data within a 250-mile (400 km) radius of the local area (the latter product was discontinued on the WeatherStar XL in July 2002). As part of the November 12, 2013, graphical overhaul, observation data outside of the sky condition and temperature (which had previously been shown at once) switched to a two-page format (with the wind and apparent temperature data being shown first); a gauge display illustrating the temperature also began to accompany the current sky condition and the textual display of the temperature on the pane. During national programming, the dew point and barometric pressure values were moved from the Lower Display Line to the sidebar generated by the IntelliStar 2.
Local Forecast^{WS}	This product is a descriptive forecast for the following 12- to 36-hour period (with the timeline of the forecast period set at specific times, usually around 3:00 a.m. or 3:00 p.m., with some intermediate updates), showing in detail, the forecasted weather conditions, temperature and wind for each period. The forecasts were originally sourced from zone products provided by local National Weather Service forecast offices (denoted in the title banner by the logo of the National Oceanic and Atmospheric Administration, which appeared pixelated on the WeatherStar 3000 and 4000, and in high resolution on the WeatherStar XL); in April 2002, the descriptive forecasts began to be provided by The Weather Channel, which resulted in the addition of specified forecast temperatures (NWS zone forecasts only provide temperature data in the form of a generalized range, as they cover individual jurisdictions rather than specific cities) and wind speeds, as well as more specific references to expected hazardous weather conditions. The descriptive forecasts were originally a text-only product until October 23, 2007, when a visual display of the forecasted illustrating the expected sky condition (originally as a right-third graphic showing realistic depictions of weather conditions, before switching to an icon-based format accompanied by the chance of precipitation on November 12, 2013). Weather watches were previously incorporated into the product when zone forecasts were used (which the NWS continues to incorporate). The version seen on the Lower Display Line incorporates estimated precipitation totals where applicable.
Hourly Forecast	Introduced in May 2010, this product displays the forecasted weather conditions, temperatures and probability of precipitation for the next 12-hour period (shown in both text and graph format) in two-hour increments. Originally seen before the descriptive forecast product, this product was shown within that product during the local forecast segments from November 12, 2013, to October 21, 2014, appearing after the forecast for the current day or night. It now only appears on the LDL during national programming.
Extended Forecast/The Week Ahead^{WS}	One of the few products featured in all forecast flavors, it originally provided forecasts for the three-day period beginning the day after the conclusion of the time period covered by the descriptive forecast (if shown on a Monday, for example, the forecast would run from Wednesday through Friday); beginning in March 2002 on the WeatherStar XL and IntelliStar, the segment began providing seven-day forecasts that started with the current day (or the following day, if aired during the late afternoon and nighttime hours). The product provides the forecasted sky condition (in both a descriptive format and illustrated via weather icons) and expected high and low temperatures. Until the original three-day version was discontinued from use on the IntelliStar on March 20, 2008, some systems either alternated between the three-day and seven-day products or used only the seven-day product. On the Lower Display Line, the product displays the forecast for the next three days, starting the day after the next (if shown on a Sunday, the forecast will be for Tuesday, Wednesday and Thursday), showing sky conditions, temperatures and precipitation probabilities.
Almanac^{Jr, 4000, XL, IS, IS2}	Introduced with the WeatherStar 4000, this product originally provided sunrise/sunset times for the current and following day, and moon phase data for the local area; the sun and moon data are calculated on the WeatherStar, and is therefore unique in that the data never expires. The IntelliStar introduced an alternate version in 2008, which replaced the moon phase data with the previous day's observed maximum and minimum temperatures, and temperature averages and extremes (including the year of the recorded extreme temperature) for the current date. Some IntelliStar units used only one version, while others alternated between both for each forecast segment. This product was discontinued from the local segments on November 12, 2013, with elements in the original version of the product featured on local forecasts on DirecTV systems (except when a weather bulletin is issued [sunrise and sunset times also appear on DirecTV's Red Button feature]) and elements in both versions of the product being relegated to the sidebar generated by the IntelliStar 2 during national programming. After the sidebar was removed in 2019, the remaining element of the product is now only shown on the LDL. The LDL featured on units from WeatherStar III and newer display the total month-to-date precipitation for one location.
Radar^{4000, XL, IS, IS2}	This product features Doppler radar data compiled by National Weather Service radar sites. The segment was introduced with the WeatherStar 4000 and originally provided both a 90-minute loop and a static image showing the most recent radar imagery for a 125-mile (201 km) radius of the STAR's headend location; beginning in 2006, WeatherStar models from XL and later extended the loop length to three hours, incorporated a data mask to decipher mixed precipitation and snow from liquid precipitation, and added two additional loops: a regional loop for a 200-mile (320 km) radius of the current location, and a zoomed-in local radar loop for a 125-mile (201 km) radius of the metropolitan area. As of September 2015, during national segments, the radar is also shown on the sidebar on IntelliStar 2 HD and xD units.
Air Quality Report^{XL, IS, IS2}	Introduced on the WeatherStar 4000 for use in Southern California and expanded to other U.S. cities with the release of the IntelliStar, the original version of the product displayed a labeled and color-coded bar graph (yellow indicating Good, light orange indicating Mod. Risk, dark orange indicating Unhealthy, and red indicating Very Unhealthy) in which the air quality index (formerly Pollutant Standards Index) value appears as a number inside or to the right of each bar. The XL version was modified to include air quality values for three locations; the IntelliStar versions shows values for one location (three in some metropolitan areas) in the upper-left, with the right-side graph (displayed as three smaller and horizontal graphs in some areas) showing arrows to indicate the labelled rating (green indicated "Good," yellow indicated "Moderate," orange indicated "Unhealthy for Sensitive Groups," red indicated "Unhealthy," and maroon indicated "Very Unhealthy"), and the main pollutant (such as ozone or fine particles) in the lower-left (instead of the total amount of pollutants). This product was discontinued from the local forecast segments on April 1, 2013. Since the graphics revamp in November 2013, it was only displayed on the sidebar generated by the IntelliStar 2 during national programming. However, as of February 2016 it is relocated to the main LDL on all IntelliStar 2 units.
Greeting^{IS, IS2}	Introduced in November 2013, the product features randomized blurbs shown at the beginning of the segment, which may include a witty joke or other random musings, prefaced by the city of the primary observation site's origin (for example, "[City], this day may be turned up to 11"). If a weather alert is in effect, a generic message "[City], this is your weather" is displayed instead.
Weather Bulletins^{XL, IS, IS2}	Introduced in April 2002 on the WeatherStar XL, this product displays watches, warnings (excluding severe thunderstorm and tornado warnings, which are instead shown on the Lower Display Line's alert crawl) or advisories that are currently in effect for the local area, as issued by the National Weather Service. Prior to 2002, these were displayed at the top of the 36-Hour Forecast but was moved due to issues with text running over the NOAA logo.
Traffic Information^{IS, IS2}	Beta tested in April 2005 in the Atlanta market and originally available nationwide from May 2005 to December 8, 2010, IntelliStar units provided a product showing traffic conditions for major metropolitan areas where information provider Traffic Pulse supplies data (which gathered the information in real time from intelligent transportation systems operated by state departments of transportation). The data appeared as separate products, which showed traffic flow on area roadways (in the form of a map which delineated areas of potential congestion by color – green for low impact, yellow indicated moderate impact and red for high impact travel – and a text-based graphic showing average current speeds for three specific stretches of local roadways), and data on active traffic accidents and current or expected construction in order of impact. The product was restored in July 2014 as a feature exclusive to the LDL (with data provided through an unknown provider), with impact data now displaying three accidents or road construction projects on major highways and roads indicated by an exclamation mark, and flow information showing data for three major highways in the area in both inbound and outbound directions, depending on how each site is monitored and are cycled with each segment. If automatic observation is used, conditions are reported in a descriptive manner similar to the discontinued Traffic Overview map, while the average speed (in miles per hour) and estimated trip time (in minutes) is shown if manual observation is used.

=== Former products ===
Segment	Description
==== Observation products ====
Latest Observations^{WS} (May 2, 1982 - April 1, 2013)	A product originated with the WeatherStar I, it showed a rundown of the current temperature, weather conditions, and wind speed at seven (later, eight) nearby locations near – or sometimes, including – the primary observation site. Originally a text-based product, icons were incorporated with the initial release of the WeatherStar XL; a map-based version of the product was introduced in July 2002. After the product's removal, current weather observations for certain cities outside the primary observation site continue to appear on the Lower Display Line.
Metro Conditions^{XL, IS, IS2} (2006 - April 1, 2013)	Introduced in 2006 and discontinued on April 1, 2013, the product was a map-based version of the Latest Observations product, usually with the addition of one to three extra locations; however, wind data is excluded.
Regional Conditions^{WS} (May 2, 1982 - June 2003 (XL)/April 1, 2013 (IS))	A product originated with the WeatherStar I, it showed current temperature and sky conditions for seven to ten cities around the region. Originally a text-based product that displayed only seven reporting sites, a map-based version incorporating icons (originally the same set used on the Current Conditions and Extended Forecast, before receiving its own icon set) was introduced in 1990 on the WeatherStar 4000.
Radar/Satellite^{IS, IS2} (2008 - April 1, 2013)	This regional product featured a composite of visible satellite and radar data, showing the movement of weather systems over the course of five hours. This product was only available on IntelliStar units in the Eastern and Central United States, Alaska and Hawaii.
Satellite^{IS, IS2} (2004 - April 1, 2013)	This product shows a visible satellite image of the region showing the movement of weather systems over the course of ten hours. It was regularly available on IntelliStar units in the Western United States, Puerto Rico and the Virgin Islands; however, it appeared in other coastal areas when a hurricane, tropical storm, or large Nor'easter approached.
==== General forecast products ====
Daypart Forecast^{XL, IS, IS2} (March 2002 - April 1, 2013)	This segment displayed the forecasted temperature, sky conditions and wind speed/direction for four time periods within the succeeding 24 hours.
Regional Forecast^{WS} (May 2, 1982 - April 1, 2013)	A product originated with the WeatherStar I, it was an observation product that displayed forecasted temperature and weather conditions for seven to ten cities in the region. Originally a text-based product, a map-based version featuring the icon set used in the Regional Conditions product was introduced in 1991.
Metro Forecast^{XL, IS, IS2} (July 2002 - November 12, 2013)	Introduced in select urban areas as a replacement for the regional forecast, the product was composed of a map displaying the forecasted temperature and weather conditions for the main city and 7 to 11 nearby cities or suburbs (the number of observation sites varied depending upon the STAR model). Currently, forecasts for certain cities outside the primary observation site continue to appear on the Lower Display Line.
Travel Cities Forecast^{WS−} (1988 - 1998)	This segment provided forecasts for 24 large and mid-sized U.S. cities; the cities featured in the product were not substituted in markets which the product listed forecast information. The product was originally a text-based product until late fall 1992, when it became icon-based and was renamed "Travel Forecast For (day)". Until 2008, the local forecast segments seen on the national satellite feed also featured extended forecasts (for a four-day period) for 30 U.S. cities.
Summary^{IS, IS2} (November 12, 2013 - October 21, 2014)	This product featured an at-a-glance review of the entire forecast, highlighting the current temperature and sky condition, current radar and a 12-hour forecast. It has been replaced with a hashtagged version of the channel's slogan "#ItsAmazingOutThere".
==== Specialty products ====
Morning/Afternoon Commute^{IS, IS2} (2008 - November 12, 2013)	This product showed the forecasted weather conditions and temperatures for the main observation site and eight to eleven other locations around the area during the peak times of either the morning or evening rush hours (7:00 a.m. and 5:00 p.m.), depending on the airtime of the local forecast segment.
Getaway Forecast^{IS, IS2} (2004 - August 17, 2011)	This product provided three-day forecasts, including the predicted conditions for the current day, for three randomly chosen vacation/travel destinations around the region (which are not selected by Weather Channel personnel). This product is now only displayed on the sidebar seen on the satellite feed during national programming, along with airport delays on sidebars both generated by the Intellistar 2 and seen on the national feed.
School Day Weather/Outdoor Activity Forecast^{IS, IS2} (2004 - July 25, 2011)	The former segment, which was seen only on days when local schools are in session, featured forecasted weather conditions, actual and apparent temperature, wind speed/direction and UV index values for the specific times of day when area schools start and let out classes (for example, 8:00 a.m. and 3:00 p.m. in Cleveland, Ohio), depending on the airtime of the local forecast segment. On other days, the latter segment was aired instead, featured similar information for a specific time of day (usually 5:00, 8:00 or 12:00 a.m./p.m.), depending on the airtime of the local forecast segment.
Weather Information^{WS−} (1982 - 1986)	This product displayed various non-forecast-related information including weather-related trivia, past weather events in the area, or information on upcoming programming.
Local Update^{4000} (1995 - 1999)	This product provided active short-term forecasts and special weather statements issued by the local National Weather Service forecast office serving the area that the active WeatherStar 4000 unit services. The Local Update was known for causing flavors that normally had set times to be extended to unpredictable lengths due to the fact that the product could be displayed in five pages at most, depending on the overall word count of the NWS statement, resulting in frequent overruns of the STAR-generated forecast segment into national segments on the channel as well as the suspension of the 4000 unit's narration tracks. After the product's removal, the flavor lineups were stabilized.
30-Day Outlook^{WS−} (May 2, 1982 - 1995)	This text-only product provided predicted temperature and precipitation outlooks for the area (outlined in three categories: below normal, normal and above normal) by the National Weather Service. The product was removed from STAR models from WeatherStar 4000 and earlier with its discontinuance by the NWS in 1995.
Marine Forecast^{WS} (May 2, 1982 - 2002 (XL)/November 12, 2013 (IS))	Available in select coastal areas and similar to the version used on the 4000, this product shows the forecasted wind speed (in knots) and direction, wave heights, and any marine warnings in effect for area waters up to 5 miles (8.0 km) from the coast, provided originally by National Weather Service and later by TWC.
Tides^{WS} (May 2, 1982 - April 1, 2013)	Seen only in coastal areas, in place of the Almanac, this product showed the day's high and low tide times for two locations in the area, as well as the day's sunrise and sunset times. It is now only displayed on sidebar generated by the IntelliStar 2 during program segments.
Record Temperature Report^{IS, IS2} (2004 - November 12, 2013)	A rare product that was only displayed if unusually hot, warm, cool or cold weather was forecasted for the local area.
Heat Safety Tips^{IS, IS2} (2008 - April 1, 2013)	A rarely used product seen only during the summer months, it displayed the current heat index (usually when the apparent temperature is above 100°F), suffaced by tips on how to stay safe during conditions of extreme heat.
Traffic Overview^{IS} (December 15, 2005 - December 8, 2010)	Seen in metropolitan areas serviced by TrafficPulse, it was a map-based product that displayed the major highways in the immediate metropolitan area, which were shaded to indicate traffic conditions (green indicated roadways clear of traffic congestion; yellow indicated moderate congestion; red indicated heavy congestion; and gray indicated that traffic condition data was unavailable for a stretch of roadway at the given time). Not all IntelliStars with traffic data showed this product. The product was removed due to the expiration of The Weather Channel's content agreement with TrafficPulse.
