= Local on the 8s =

Local forecast segments aired on The Weather Channel

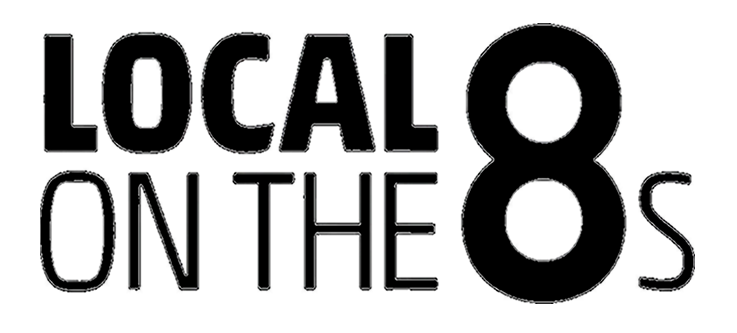
- Also known as: Local Forecast (1982–1996, 1998–2002)
- Created by: The Weather Channel
- Based on: Weather forecast
- Narrated by: (Note: narrator lines were automated and later on from Weatherstar XL systems onward narrator lines were read out automaically in a systematically way to mirror the on screen forecast through a technology called Vocal Local): Dan Chandler (1987–1995); Allen Jackson (2000–2015) (Note: Only on IntelliStar and WeatherSTAR XL systems.); Jim Cantore (2010–present) (Note: Only on IntelliSTAR 2 systems.)
- Composer: Various
- Country of origin: United States
- Original language: English

Production
- Running time: Varying from 30 seconds to 5 minutes (1982–1998); 1-2 minutes (1998-2013); 1 minute (2013–present)

Original release
- Network: The Weather Channel
- Release: May 2, 1982 – present

Local on the 8s (or the Local Forecast; Spanish: Local en los 8s o el Pronóstico Local) is a weather forecasting segment that airs on The Weather Channel (Spanish: El Canal del Tiempo). It provides viewers with information on current and forecasted weather conditions for their respective area; a version of this segment is also available on the channel's national satellite feed that features forecasts for each region of the United States.

The name comes from the timing of the segment, as it airs at timeslots that end in "8" (e.g. 9:18, 9:28, 12:48). As of April 2018, the segment airs at approximately :18 past each hour. It also usually airs at approximately :48 past each hour during live Weather Channel broadcasts. Because of this manner of scheduling, the forecast segments air on the channel in ten-minute intervals. From 2006 to 2013, each forecast segment was preceded by a promo for one of The Weather Channel's programs or services, leading into the segment with the announcer stating "And now, your Local on the 8s". On November 12, 2013, the promo segment was replaced by an intro that was built into the Local on the 8s segment.

== History ==
The Weather Channel has carried a local weather forecast segment since the network was launched on May 2, 1982. The segments were originally seen either every five minutes or eight times an hour at various times (airing more frequently in the morning and less frequently at night). The structure of scheduling the segments six times an hour at times ending in "8" was implemented in mid-1995. The "Local on the 8s" name was first used on April 21, 1996 to coincide with a sweeping revamp of the channel's on-air presentation; The Weather Channel filed for a trademark on the name on June 24, 1997. The name has caused confusion in the New York City market, as the now-separately owned television and radio combination of WCBS-TV and WCBS Newsradio 880 use "traffic and weather on the 8s" to refer to the combined traffic and weather segments featured on those stations (which appear on WCBS-TV only during its morning newscasts and on WCBS radio at all hours).

Forecasts are generated by a WeatherStar machine, a proprietary hardware system in the form of a computerized unit that is installed in a headend at the facilities of local pay television providers that carry the channel. Weather information is received from a data stream encapsulated within the TWC video feed transmitted via satellite, which is then sent to the WeatherStar unit that inserts the localized data over the TWC feed. The WeatherStar systems are capable of adding or removing segments shown within the main local forecast segment, with the common exception of the extended forecast; these customized segments are referred to as "flavors," which allow variabilities in the weather graphics displayed during each local forecast segment, resulting in certain types of specialized weather data appearing only at specific times or lengths. As of April 2013, the length of these flavors is uniformly one minute; flavor lengths previously varied between 30 seconds and two minutes prior to April 2013 and extended flavors of three to six minutes were previously included between the late 1980s and the mid-1990s.

As of April 2018, the segment airs at approximately :18 past each hour. It also usually airs at approximately :48 past each hour during live Weather Channel broadcasts.

On June 26, 2023, TWC announced an hour-long feature called "Retro 8s", featuring visuals inspired by the WeatherStar 4000 used before the IntelliStar update in 2008, as well as much of the jazz music previously featured in the segment through the 1990s and 2000s. Retro 8s and Twilight Live were quietly discontinued on November 6, 2023.

== Music ==
Until 2013, pop and smooth jazz music was regularly played during the "Local on the 8s" segments. This was so well-known that in 2007, The Weather Channel released its own smooth jazz compilation album, The Weather Channel Presents: The Best of Smooth Jazz, based on collections of popular music played during the "Local On the 8s" segments. It peaked at #1 on Billboard's Top Contemporary Jazz charts that year. In 2013, The Weather Channel switched to mostly playing production music produced exclusively for the network, and in 2023, the network switched to using music from the Transition Music Corporation's library.

Music that is heard over the national feed's forecast segments is also transmitted over the localized segments generated by the STAR headend units.
