= Been There, Done That =

Been There, Done That may refer to:

- Been There, Done That (The Riches), season 1 (2007), episode 4, from the TV series The Riches
- Been There, Done That (Xena episode), season 3 (1997-98), episode 2, from the TV series Xena: Warrior Princess
- Been There, Done That (book), 2016 non-fiction book by Al Roker and Deborah Roberts
- "Been There, Done That" (Dr. Dre song), 1996
- "Been There Done That" (NOTD song), 2018
- "Been There, Done That", song by Luke Bryan from the album Tailgates & Tanlines, 2011
- "Been There, Done That", song by Emma Bunton from the album A Girl Like Me, 2001
- "Been There, Done That", song by Brian Eno and John Cale from the album Wrong Way Up, 1990
- "Been There, Done That", song by Memphis May Fire from album Sleepwalking, 2009
- "Been There Done That", by Moka Only and Def3 from Dog River, 2007
- Been There, Done That..., album by Eddie and the Hot Rods, 2006

== See also ==
- "Been There", a song by Clint Black and Steve Wariner
- "Been There", a single by Moka Only from Lime Green, 2001
