= Sharkey =

Sharkey (Irish: Ó Searcaigh) is a surname of Irish origin. Notable people with the surname include:

- Anna Sharkey (born 1987), British goalball player
- Bill Sharkey (1873–1946), Australian rules footballer
- Bill Sharkey (boxer) (1949–1998), American boxer
- Brendan Sharkey (born 1962), American lawyer and politician from Connecticut
- Catherine Sharkey (born 1970), American jurist
- Ed Sharkey (1927–2015), American football player
- Eddie Sharkey (born 1936), American professional wrestler and trainer
- Emma Augusta Sharkey (1858–1902), American writer
- Feargal Sharkey (born 1958), Northern Irish lead singer of the pop punk band The Undertones
- Harry Sharkey (1916–2002), American rower
- Heather J. Sharkey (born 1967), American historian
- Isaiah Sharkey (born 1989), American guitarist and singer-songwriter
- Jack Sharkey (1902–1994), American heavyweight boxing champion
- Jack Sharkey (footballer) (1874–1961), Australian rules footballer
- Jack Sharkey (writer) (1931–1992), American author and playwright
- Jackie Sharkey (1897–1970), Italian-born American boxer
- James A. Sharkey (born 1945), Irish historian and diplomat
- Jerry Sharkey (1942–2014), American historic preservationist and historian
- Jesse Sharkey (born 1970), American schoolteacher and labor leader in Chicago
- Jim Sharkey (1934–2014), Scottish footballer
- Joe Sharkey, (1946–2023), American true crime author and columnist for The New York Times
- John Sharkey, Baron Sharkey (born 1947), British politician
- Jonathon Sharkey (born 1964), American professional wrestler and perennial candidate
- Josh Sharkey (born 1997), American basketball player
- Kathleen Sharkey (born 1990), American field hockey player
- Kevin Sharkey (born 1961), Irish artist
- Kevin Sharkey (executive), American publishing executive
- Kevin Sharkey (journalist) (born 1964), Irish broadcast journalist
- Kristen Sharkey (born 1992), American basketball player and coach
- Lance Sharkey (1898–1967), Australian trade union activist, radical journalist and communist politician
- Michael Sharkey (born 1946), Australian poet, biographer and academic
- Niamh Sharkey (born 1973), Irish author and illustrator of children's books
- Nick Sharkey (1943–2015), Scottish footballer
- Noel Sharkey (born 1948), British computer scientist
- Pat Sharkey (born 1953), Northern Ireland footballer
- Patrick Sharkey (born c. 1978), American sociologist
- Patrick Sharkey (boxer) (1931–2016), Irish boxer
- Paul Sharkey (born 1974), Australian rules footballer
- Ray Sharkey (1952–1993), American actor
- Sarah Sharkey, medical officer in the Royal Australian Navy
- Seamus Sharkey (born 1990), Manx footballer
- Seymour Sharkey (1847–1929), British physician
- Steve Sharkey (1918–1995), American basketball player
- Thomas D. Sharkey, American plant biochemist
- Tina Sharkey (born 1964), American entrepreneur
- Tom Sharkey (1873–1953), American boxer
- William J. Sharkey (US Navy officer) (1885–1918)
- William J. Sharkey (murderer) (c.1847 – after 1873), convicted murderer and minor New York City politician
- William L. Sharkey (1798–1873), American judge and politician

Fictional characters include:

- Sharkey, the antagonist of "The Scouring of the Shire" in The Lord of the Rings
- Finn Sharkey, in the UK TV series Waterloo Road
- Francis Ethelbert Sharkey, a character in the TV series Voyage to the Bottom of the Sea
- Captain John Sharkey, the main character of Sir Arthur Conan Doyle's 1925 novel The Dealings of Captain Sharkey
- Otto Sharkey, title character of C.P.O. Sharkey, a 1976–1978 American television series, played by Don Rickles
- Tom Sharky, protagonist of the 1981 film Sharky's Machine, played by Burt Reynolds

== See also ==
- DJ Sharkey, stage name of the music DJ and record producer Jonathan Kneath (born 1974)
- Bill Sharky, former member of The Barron Knights, a British humorous pop group
