= CLSM =

CLSM can refer to:

- Confocal laser scanning microscopy, a technique for obtaining high-resolution optical images
- Controlled low strength material, a construction material
- CLSM, alternate alias of disc jockey Jon Doe
