= Martha Gets Down and Dirty =

Television show on Discovery+

- Genre: Reality television
- Created by: Martha Stewart
- Starring: Martha Stewart; Kevin Sharkey; Ryan McCallister
- Country of origin: United States
- Original language: English
- No. of seasons: 1
- No. of episodes: 8

Production
- Executive producers: Martha Stewart; Dan Cesareo; Lucilla D'Agostino; Taylor Lucy Choi
- Producers: Rob Vonnes; Amy Silva
- Production location: Bedford, New York
- Editors: Sean Gill; Will Fleisher; Doug Garvey; Kristine Young Gaffney
- Running time: 23-29 minutes
- Production companies: Discovery+; Big Fish Entertainment

Original release
- Network: Discovery+
- Release: July 1 – August 5, 2021

Martha Gets Down and Dirty is an American reality television series which premiered on Discovery+ on July 1, 2021. Set on Martha Stewart's Bedford, New York farm, the series follows Martha Stewart, Martha Stewart Living Omnimedia Executive Director Kevin Sharkey, and Stewart's gardener, Ryan McCallister, as they complete a variety of gardening and domestic projects, with Stewart offering lifestyle tips to fans and celebrity guests. The title references both the mucky nature of gardening and the unexpectedly risqué humor employed by Stewart therein. It became best known for an exchange between Stewart and Kim Kardashian where Stewart questioned Kardashian's capacity for daily chores. According to John Anderson of The Wall Street Journal, "you could cut the tension with a cake spatula."

== Guest stars ==
- Jesse Tyler Ferguson
- Tiffany Haddish
- Tamron Hall
- Alyson Hannigan
- Paris Hilton
- Kim Kardashian
- Seth Meyers
- Ellen Pompeo
- Nicole Richie
- Al Roker
- Brooke Shields

== Episodes ==
No.	Title	Original release date
1	"Keeping Up With Martha's Trees"	1 July 2021
Martha makes the rounds on her 150 acre property in order to maintain the trees and clear dead wood. Kim Kardashian is on hand to learn new skills.
2	"Fire Up the Wieners"	1 July 2021
Martha hosts a hot dog contest and traffics in innuendos during her first barbecue of the spring season. Al Roker teaches her how to make his famous rub.
3	"The Need for Seeds"	1 July 2021
With winter over, Martha plants with the help of her seed vibrator. Martha welcomes Tiffany Haddish to the farm where they work on a special planting project.
4	"House Planting Party"	8 July 2021
Houseplants became popular during the COVID-19 lockdowns and Martha uses them to inject some beauty into her home. She teaches Alyson Hannigan how to care for orchids.
5	"Fowl Play with Martha"	15 July 2021
Martha introduces her award-winning chickens and collects fresh eggs. She is joined by Nicole Richie to swap poultry stories.
6	"You Grow Girl"	22 July 2021
Martha, Ryan and Kevin plant azaleas and tree peonies while fertilizing the boxwood allee. Jesse Tyler Ferguson gets a lesson in mixing the "Martharita" cocktail.
7	"Flower Power"	29 July 2021
Martha plants a field of roses and wild flowers. She gives Ellen Pompeo tips on arranging flowers and mixes flower-inspired cocktails with Seth Meyers.
8	"Martha Vegs Out"	5 August 2021
Martha breaks ground on her vegetable garden. She helps Brooke Shields learn about knife skills, instructs Paris Hilton on the perfect omelet, and assists Tamron Hall in making shaved ice.
