= Fly ash brick =

Building material in masonry

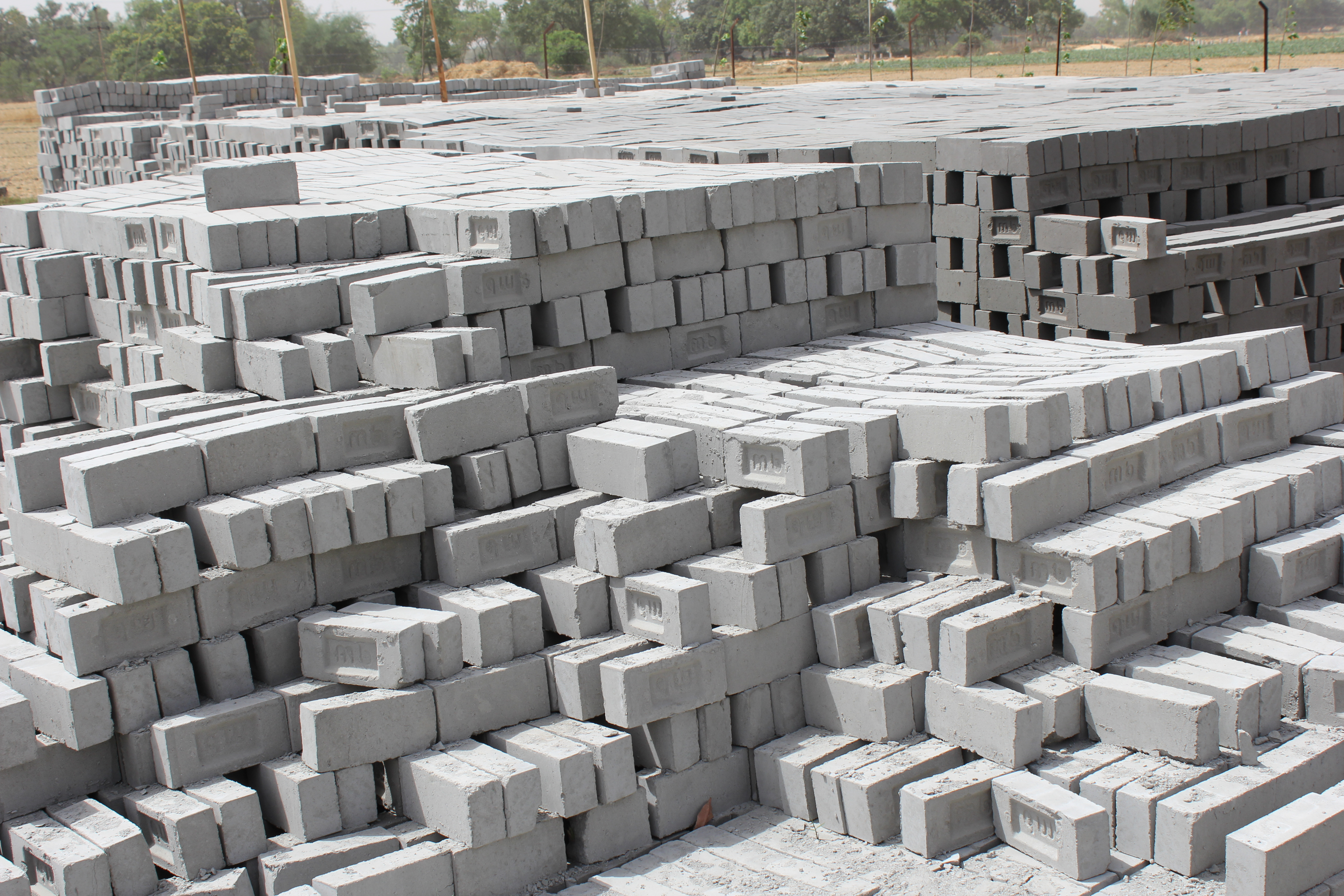
Fly ash bricks

Fly ash brick (FAB) is a building material, specifically masonry units, containing class C or class F fly ash and water. Compressed at 28 MPa (280 atm; 4,100 psi) and cured for 24 hours in a 66 °C (151 °F) steam bath, then toughened with an air entrainment agent, the bricks can last for more than 100 freeze-thaw cycles. Owing to the high concentration of calcium oxide in class C fly ash, the brick is described as "self-cementing". The manufacturing method saves energy, reduces mercury pollution in the environment, and often costs 20% less than traditional clay brick manufacturing.

Fly ash bricks are considered a key low-carbon building material in India. They are manufactured from fly ash, sand, lime, gypsum, and water without kiln firing, using curing or autoclaving processes. According to the Ministry of Environment, Forest and Climate Change (MoEFCC) notification of 2016, all construction projects within 300 kilometres of a coal or lignite thermal power plant are required to use fly-ash-based products in a prescribed proportion. This regulation aims to reduce top-soil consumption from conventional clay-brick kilns and lower greenhouse-gas emissions.

Each fly-ash brick avoids approximately 0.2 to 0.25 kg (0.44 to 0.55 lb) of carbon-dioxide emissions compared with a fired clay brick, largely because it eliminates coal-kiln firing and reuses industrial waste. A typical multi-storey 7,000–8,000 ft^{2} (650–740 m^{2}) residential building using 250,000 fly-ash bricks can save 50–60 t (55–66 short tons; 49–59 long tons) of CO₂ and prevent removal of more than 1,000 m^{3} (35,000 ft^{3}) cubic metres of fertile soil. The material also provides 40–50 percent savings in mortar usage due to dimensional accuracy and smoother surfaces.

Adoption in India has been growing but remains uneven. Small-scale brick kilns and informal supply chains still dominate, and quality variation among manufacturers affects confidence among builders. Enforcement of fly-ash utilisation rules and awareness among architects and contractors are cited as key barriers to universal adoption.

== History ==
Coal dust has historically been collected as a waste product from homes and industry. During the nineteenth century, coal ash was taken by 'scavengers' and delivered to local brick works, where the ash would be mixed with clay. The income from the sale of ash would normally pay for the collection of waste.

Clay is typically entrapped during the formation of coal. When coal is burnt, the incombustible clay particles are left behind as ash. In grate boilers, incombustible ash agglomerates as cinders through prolonged residential time. Nowadays, pulverised coal technology is preferred due to its improved energy-efficiency. In this case, the ground clay escapes along with flue gases, settling as ash in bag filters or electro static precipitators (ESPs). This gives rise to the name 'fly ash'.

== The raw materials ==
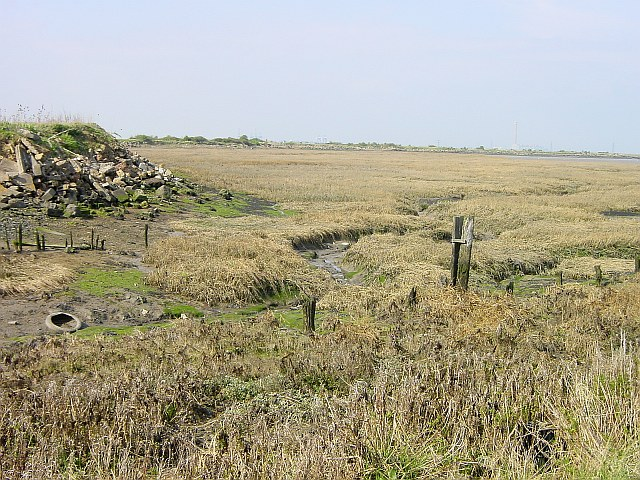
Funton Creek. Presumably this was a navigable channel in the days when the brick works was serviced by barges bringing fly-ash from London and returning with loads of bricks.

A possible material mix for the production of fly ash brick is as follows:

Material	Mass
Fly ash	60%
Sand/ Stone dust	30%
Portland Cement or Lime	10%

The strength of fly ash brick manufactured with the above compositions ranges between 7.5 and 10 MPa (1,090 and 1,450 psi). Fly ash bricks are lighter and stronger than clay bricks.

Main ingredients include fly ash, water, quicklime or lime sludge, cement, aluminum powder and gypsum. Autoclaving increases the hardness of the block by promoting quick curing of the cement. Gypsum acts as a long term strength gainer. The chemical reaction due to the aluminum paste provides AAC its distinct porous structure, lightness, and insulating properties. The aforementioned properties set it apart from other lightweight concrete materials. The finished product is a lighter block, less than 40% the weight of conventional Bricks, while providing the similar strengths. The specific gravity stays around 0.6 to 0.65. Using these blocks in buildings reduces the dead load, allowing one to save around 30 to 35% of structural steel, and concrete.

Commercial processes fall into two categories; the lime route, and the Portland Cement route where the latter is used as a source of lime. In the lime route, the composition is fly ash (50%), slaked lime (30%), and anhydrous gypsum (20%), to which 3 to 4 times as much stone dust, sand or any inert filler material can be added. In the cement route, the composition is fly ash (76%), Portland cement (20%), and anhydrite (4%), to which 3 to 4 times as much filler material can be added.

The following properties of fly ash affect the strength and look of fly ash bricks.

1. Loss on Ignition (LOI): fly ash loses weight when it burns at about 1,000 °C (1,830 °F) due to presence of carbon and water. The loss on ignition is the percentage weight lost due to carbon combustion and moisture evaporation. The lower the loss on ignition, the more durable the fly ash bricks will be. As per BIS it should not be more than 5%.
2. Fineness: fine fly ash has more surface area available to react with lime. This increases pozzolanic activity, which contributes to the strength of fly ash bricks. As per BIS it should not be more than 320 m^{2}/kg (1,600 sq ft/lb).
3. Calcium (CaO) content: the pozzolanic reactivity of fly ash is more in high calcium fly ash. The greater the pozzolanic activity leads to higher the strength of fly ash brick. As per ASTM C618 fly ash is classified into two types: Class C contains more than 10% lime and Class F fly ash contains less than 10% lime.

Based on boiler operations, fly ash can be additionally classified as LT (low temperature) and HT (high temperature). LT fly ash containing amorphous phases is generated where boiler temperature is not more than 800 °C (1,470 °F), whereas HT fly ash containing glassy reactive phases is generated at more than 1,000 °C (1,830 °F) in super thermal plants. LT fly ash reacts well with lime whereas HT fly ash reacts well with Portland cement.

== Advantages ==
1. Fly ash bricks reduce the dead load on structures due to their light weight (2.6 kg (5.7 lb), dimension: 230 mm × 110 mm × 70 mm (9.1 in × 4.3 in × 2.8 in)).
2. The same number of bricks will cover a larger area than clay bricks.
3. Fly ash provides high fire resistance.
4. Due to their high strength, there is very little breakage during transport and use.
5. Due to their uniform size, mortar required for joints and plaster reduces almost by 50%.
6. Due to lower water penetration, seepage of water through these bricks is considerably reduced.
7. Gypsum plaster can be directly applied on these bricks without a backing coat of lime plaster.
8. These bricks do not require soaking in water for 24 hours. Sprinkling of water before use is enough.

== Disadvantages ==
1. Depending on the mixture's composition, mechanical strength can be low. This can be partially rectified by adding marble waste or mortar between blocks.
2. Large size can have more breakages depending on the mix of materials.
3. These bricks have high thermal conductivity. Extra insulation is required in colder regions.
