= Jon Doe =

British dance music disc jockey

- Also known as: CLSM
- Born: Colin Meon
- Genres: Happy hardcore, hard dance
- Occupations: disc jockey, record producer
- Website: www.jondoe.net

Colin Meon, known professionally as Jon Doe, is a British hard dance disc jockey and record producer. Doe has charted several times in the UK Dance Chart, and also releases music as CLSM including the track "John Peel Is Not Enough".

== Biography ==
Doe released the single "Fire/Always", which samples the sixties track “Always Something There To Remind Me" in a gabba style, in 1996. He has produced several singles which have charted in the UK, including "NRG" which peaked at number 18 on the UK Dance Chart in 2000. In 2001, Doe collaborated with Billy Daniel Bunter to release the hard house single "Clap Your Hands", which also reached number 18 on the UK Dance Singles Chart. As CLSM, and along with Sharkey and Kutski, Doe mixed one of the CDs on the Bonkers 16 compilation album, which peaked at number 15 on the UK Compilation Chart in 2006.

Doe, with Madame Zu, produced the track "999 Matrix (The Red Pill)", known as one of the Mohawk label's "biggest classics" it was remixed in 2015 receiving a positive review in Mixmag. In 2018 Mumbles & Miss KT9 remixed the Jon Doe track "D2", which was given an 8/10 rating by critic Andy Whitby, also in Mixmag.

In the music press, Doe has been called the "master of all things uplifting", and "one of hard house’s underground legends". Fellow DJ Kutski has stated his favourite DJ experience was performing with Doe, amongst others.

=== John Peel Is Not Enough ===
In 2003 on BBC Radio 1, John Peel was the only DJ playing hard dance music above 140 BPM. To critique, or "bemoan" this, CLSM released the track "John Peel Is Not Enough" which listed all the Radio 1 DJs and the max BPM they would play, to call for more support for the genre on the station. The track came to the attention of the John Peel production team following inclusion in a Bonkers mix by DJ Sharkey, and made number 9 in the John Peel Festive 50 that same year, and was included in the 2009 retrospective album Kats Karavan: The History Of John Peel On The Radio.

== Discography ==
Jon Doe singles
Title	Artist	Year	Peak UK singles	Peak UK dance
"Fire / Always"	Jon Doe	1996		
"NRG"	Jon Doe	2000		18
"Out of It / NRG"	Dynamic Intervention / Jon Doe	2000		29
"Clap Your Hands"	Billy Daniel Bunter / Jon Doe	2001	93	18
"Feel So Good / Mind Games"	Billy Daniel Bunter / Jon Doe	2001		31
"Rock Your Body / Start Dancing"	Jon Doe	2002	100	
"John Peel Is Not Enough"	CLSM	2003		
"The Sonic Expansions - pt2"	Jon Doe	2004		38
"999 Matrix (The Red Pill)"	Jon Doe & Madame Zu	2015		
"D2"	Jon Doe	2018		
