= Coal combustion products =

By-products of coal combustion

Coal combustion products (CCPs), also called coal combustion wastes (CCWs) or coal combustion residuals (CCRs), are by-products of burning coal. They are categorized in four groups, each based on physical and chemical forms derived from coal combustion methods and emission controls:

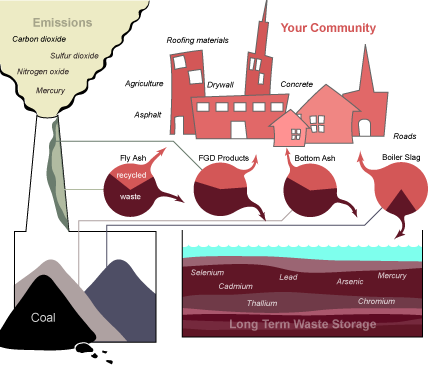
Diagram of the disposition of coal combustion wastes

- Fly ash is captured after coal combustion by filters (bag houses), electrostatic precipitators and other air pollution control devices. It comprises 60 percent of all coal combustion waste (labeled here as coal combustion products). It is most commonly used as a high-performance substitute for Portland cement or as clinker for Portland cement production. Cements blended with fly ash are becoming more common. Building material applications range from grouts and masonry products to cellular concrete and roofing tiles. Many asphalt concrete pavements contain fly ash. Geotechnical engineering applications include soil stabilization, road base, structural fill, embankments and mine reclamation. Fly ash also serves as filler in wood and plastic products, paints and metal castings.
- Flue-gas desulfurization (FGD) materials are produced by chemical "scrubber" emission control systems that remove sulfur and oxides from power plant flue gas streams. FGD comprises 24 percent of all coal combustion waste. Residues vary, but the most common are FGD gypsum (or "synthetic" gypsum) and spray dryer absorbents. FGD gypsum is used in almost thirty percent of the gypsum panel products manufactured in the U.S. It is also used in agricultural applications to treat undesirable soil conditions and to improve crop performance. Other FGD materials are used in mining and land reclamation activities.
- Bottom ash and boiler slag can be used as a raw feed for manufacturing portland cement clinker, as well as for skid control on icy roads. The two materials comprise 12 and 4 percent of coal combustion waste respectively. These materials are also suitable for geotechnical applications such as structural fills and land reclamation. The physical characteristics of bottom ash and boiler slag lend themselves as replacements for aggregate in flowable fill and in concrete masonry products. Boiler slag is also used for roofing granules and as blasting grit.

== Fly ash ==
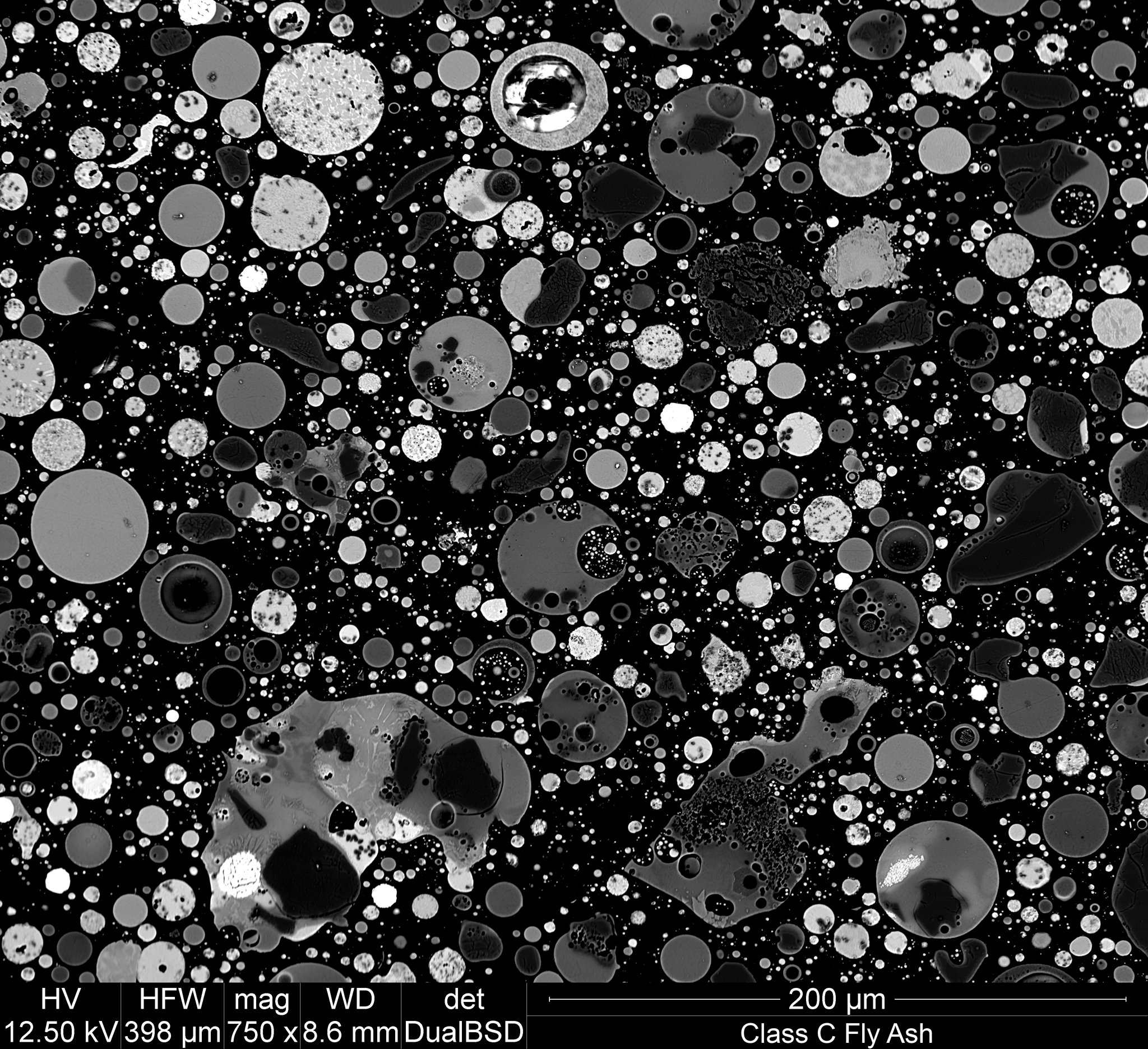
Photomicrograph made with a scanning electron microscope and back-scatter detector: cross section of fly ash particles

Fly ash, flue ash, coal ash, or pulverised fuel ash (in the UK)—plurale tantum: coal combustion residuals (CCRs)—is a coal combustion product that is composed of the particulates that are driven out of coal-fired boilers together with the flue gases. Ash that falls to the bottom of the boiler's combustion chamber (commonly called a firebox) is called bottom ash. In modern coal-fired power plants, fly ash is generally captured by electrostatic precipitators or other particle filtration equipment before the flue gases reach the chimneys. Together with bottom ash removed from the bottom of the boiler, it is known as coal ash.

Depending upon the source and composition of the coal being burned, the components of fly ash vary considerably, but all fly ash includes substantial amounts of silicon dioxide (SiO_{2}) (both amorphous and crystalline), aluminium oxide (Al_{2}O_{3}) and calcium oxide (CaO), the main mineral compounds in coal-bearing rock strata.

The use of fly ash as a lightweight aggregate (LWA) offers a valuable opportunity to recycle one of the largest waste streams in the US, providing many economic and environmental benefits in the process.

The minor constituents of fly ash depend upon the specific coal bed composition but may include one or more of the following elements or compounds found in trace concentrations (up to hundreds of ppm): gallium, arsenic, beryllium, boron, cadmium, chromium, hexavalent chromium, cobalt, lead, manganese, mercury, molybdenum, selenium, strontium, thallium, and vanadium, along with very small concentrations of dioxins, PAH compounds, and other trace carbon compounds.

In the past, fly ash was generally released into the atmosphere, but air pollution control standards now require that it be captured prior to release by fitting pollution control equipment. In the United States, fly ash is generally stored at coal power plants or placed in landfills. About 43% is recycled, often used as a pozzolan to produce hydraulic cement or hydraulic plaster and a replacement or partial replacement for Portland cement in concrete production. Pozzolans ensure the setting of concrete and plaster and provide concrete with more protection from wet conditions and chemical attack.

In the case that fly (or bottom) ash is not produced from coal, for example when solid waste is incinerated in a waste-to-energy facility to produce electricity, the ash may contain higher levels of contaminants than coal ash. In that case the ash produced is often classified as hazardous waste.

=== Chemical composition and classification ===
Fly ash composition by coal type
Component	Bituminous	Subbituminous	Lignite
SiO_{2} (%)	20–60	40–60	15–45
Al_{2}O_{3} (%)	5–35	20–30	20–25
Fe_{2}O_{3} (%)	10–40	4–10	4–15
CaO (%)	1–12	5–30	15–40
LOI (%)	0–15	0–3	0–5

Fly ash material solidifies while suspended in the exhaust gases and is collected by electrostatic precipitators or filter bags. Since the particles solidify rapidly while suspended in the exhaust gases, fly ash particles are generally spherical in shape and range in size from 0.5 μm to 300 μm. The major consequence of the rapid cooling is that few minerals have time to crystallize, and that mainly amorphous, quenched glass remains. Nevertheless, some refractory phases in the pulverized coal do not melt (entirely), and remain crystalline. In consequence, fly ash is a heterogeneous material.

SiO_{2}, Al_{2}O_{3}, Fe_{2}O_{3} and occasionally CaO are the main chemical components present in fly ashes. The mineralogy of fly ashes is very diverse. The main phases encountered are a glass phase, together with quartz, mullite and the iron oxides hematite, magnetite and/or maghemite. Other phases often identified are cristobalite, anhydrite, free lime, periclase, calcite, sylvite, halite, portlandite, rutile and anatase. The Ca-bearing minerals anorthite, gehlenite, akermanite and various calcium silicates and calcium aluminates identical to those found in Portland cement can be identified in Ca-rich fly ashes. The mercury content can reach 1 ppm, but is generally included in the range 0.01–1 ppm for bituminous coal. The concentrations of other trace elements vary as well according to the kind of coal combusted to form it.

==== Classification ====
Two classes of fly ash are defined by American Society for Testing and Materials (ASTM) C618: Class F fly ash and Class C fly ash. The chief difference between these classes is the amount of calcium, silica, alumina, and iron content in the ash. The chemical properties of the fly ash are largely influenced by the chemical content of the coal burned (i.e., anthracite, bituminous, and lignite).

Not all fly ashes meet ASTM C618 requirements, although depending on the application, this may not be necessary. Fly ash used as a cement replacement must meet strict construction standards, but no standard environmental regulations have been established in the United States. Seventy-five percent of the fly ash must have a fineness of 45 μm or less, and have a carbon content, measured by the loss on ignition (LOI), of less than 4%. In the US, LOI must be under 6%. The particle size distribution of raw fly ash tends to fluctuate constantly, due to changing performance of the coal mills and the boiler performance. This makes it necessary that, if fly ash is used in an optimal way to replace cement in concrete production, it must be processed using beneficiation methods like mechanical air classification. But if fly ash is used as a filler to replace sand in concrete production, unbeneficiated fly ash with higher LOI can be also used. Especially important is the ongoing quality verification. This is mainly expressed by quality control seals like the Bureau of Indian Standards mark or the DCL mark of Dubai.

- Class "F": The burning of harder, older anthracite and bituminous coal typically produces Class F fly ash. This fly ash is pozzolanic in nature, and contains less than 7% lime (CaO). Possessing pozzolanic properties, the glassy silica and alumina of Class F fly ash requires a cementing agent, such as Portland cement, quicklime, or hydrated lime—mixed with water to react and produce cementitious compounds. Alternatively, adding a chemical activator such as sodium silicate (water glass) to a Class F ash can form a geopolymer.
- Class "C": Fly ash produced from the burning of younger lignite or sub-bituminous coal, in addition to having pozzolanic properties, also has some self-cementing properties. In the presence of water, Class C fly ash hardens and gets stronger over time. Class C fly ash generally contains more than 20% lime (CaO). Unlike Class F, self-cementing Class C fly ash does not require an activator. Alkali and sulfate (SO_{4}) contents are generally higher in Class C fly ashes. At least one US manufacturer has announced a fly ash brick containing up to 50% Class C fly ash. Testing shows bricks meet or exceed the performance standards listed in ASTM C 216 for conventional clay brick. It is also within the allowable shrinkage limits for concrete brick in ASTM C 55, Standard Specification for Concrete Building Brick. It is estimated that the production method used in fly ash bricks will reduce the embodied energy of masonry construction by up to 90%. Bricks and pavers were expected to be available in commercial quantities before the end of 2009.

=== Disposal and market sources ===
In the past, fly ash produced from coal combustion was simply entrained in flue gases and dispersed into the atmosphere. This created environmental and health concerns that prompted laws in heavily industrialized countries like the United States that have reduced fly ash emissions to less than 1% of ash produced. Worldwide, more than 65% of fly ash produced from coal power stations is disposed of in landfills and ash ponds.

Ash that is stored or deposited outdoors can eventually leach toxic compounds into underground water aquifers. For this reason, much of the current debate around fly ash disposal revolves around creating specially lined landfills that prevent the chemical compounds from being leached into the ground water and local ecosystems.

Since coal was the dominant energy source in the United States for many decades, power companies often located their coal plants near metropolitan areas. Compounding the environmental issues, the coal plants need significant amounts of water to operate their boilers, leading coal plants (and later their fly ash storage basins) to be located near metropolitan areas and near rivers and lakes which are often used as drinking supplies by nearby cities. Many of those fly ash basins were unlined and also at great risk of spilling and flooding from nearby rivers and lakes. For example, Duke Energy in North Carolina has been involved in several major lawsuits related to its coal ash storage and spills into the leakage of ash into the water basin.

The recycling of fly ash has become an increasing concern in recent years due to increasing landfill costs and current interest in sustainable development. In 2024, coal-fired power plants in the US reported producing 24.7 million short tons (22.4×10^{6} t) of fly ash, of which 78% was reused in various applications. Environmental benefits to recycling fly ash includes reducing the demand for virgin materials that would need quarrying and cheap substitution for materials such as Portland cement.

== Reuse ==
About 52 percent of CCPs in the U.S. were recycled for "beneficial uses" in 2019, according to the American Coal Ash Association. In Australia about 47% of coal ash was recycled in 2020. The chief benefit of recycling is to stabilize the environmentally harmful components of the CCPs such as arsenic, beryllium, boron, cadmium, chromium, chromium VI, cobalt, lead, manganese, mercury, molybdenum, selenium, strontium, thallium, and vanadium, along with dioxins and polycyclic aromatic hydrocarbons.

There is no US governmental registration or labelling of fly ash utilization in the different sectors of the economy – industry, infrastructures and agriculture. Fly ash utilization survey data, acknowledged as incomplete, are published annually by the American Coal Ash Association.

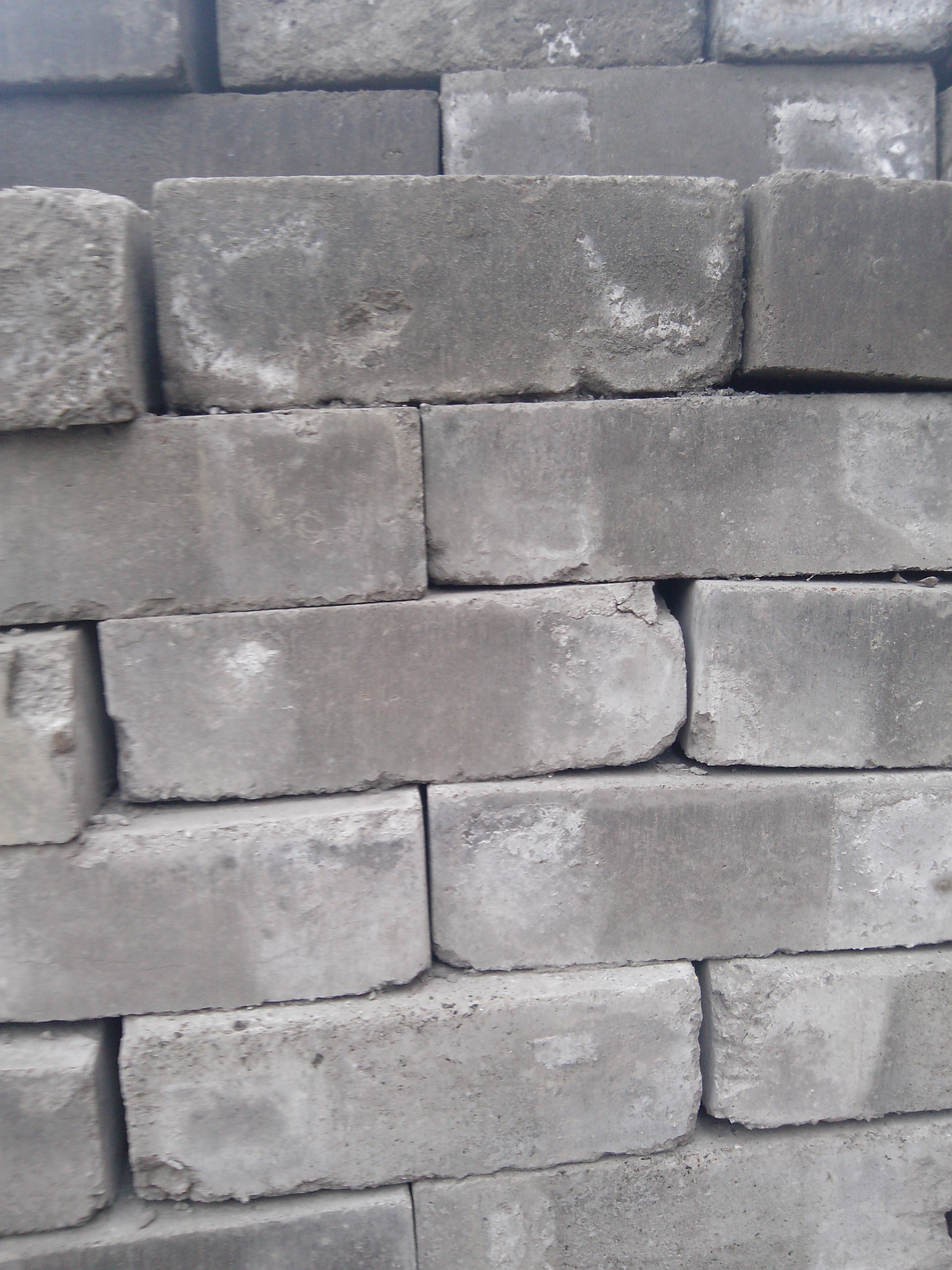
A stack of fly ash bricks

Coal ash uses include (approximately in order of decreasing importance):

- Concrete production, as a substitute material for Portland cement, sand.
- Corrosion control in reinforced concrete (RC) structures
- Fly-ash pellets which can replace normal aggregate in concrete mixture.
- Embankments and other structural fills (usually for road construction)
- Grout and Flowable fill production
- Waste stabilization and solidification
- Cement clinker production (as a substitute material for clay)
- Mine reclamation
- Stabilization of soft soils
- Road subbase construction
- As aggregate substitute material (e.g. for brick production)
- Mineral filler in asphalt concrete
- Agricultural uses: soil amendment, fertilizer, cattle feeders, soil stabilization in stock feed yards, and agricultural stakes
- Loose application on rivers to melt ice
- Loose application on roads and parking lots for ice control

Other applications include cosmetics, toothpaste, kitchen counter tops, floor and ceiling tiles, bowling balls, flotation devices, stucco, utensils, tool handles, picture frames, auto bodies and boat hulls, cellular concrete, geopolymers, roof tiles, roofing granules, decking, fireplace mantles, cinder block, PVC pipe, structural insulated panels, house siding and trim, running tracks, blasting grit, recycled plastic lumber, utility poles and crossarms, railway sleepers, highway noise barriers, marine pilings, doors, window frames, scaffolding, sign posts, crypts, columns, railroad ties, vinyl flooring, paving stones, shower stalls, garage doors, park benches, landscape timbers, planters, pallet blocks, molding, mail boxes, artificial reef, binding agent, paints and undercoatings, metal castings, and filler in wood and plastic products.

=== Portland cement ===
Owing to its pozzolanic properties, fly ash is used as a replacement for Portland cement in concrete. The use of fly ash as a pozzolanic ingredient was recognized as early as 1914, although the earliest noteworthy study of its use was in 1937. Roman structures such as aqueducts or the Pantheon in Rome used volcanic ash or pozzolana (which possesses similar properties to fly ash) as pozzolan in their concrete. As pozzolan greatly improves the strength and durability of concrete, the use of ash is a key factor in their preservation.

Use of fly ash as a partial replacement for Portland cement is particularly suitable but not limited to Class C fly ashes. Class "F" fly ashes can have volatile effects on the entrained air content of concrete, causing reduced resistance to freeze/thaw damage. Fly ash often replaces up to 30% by mass of Portland cement, but can be used in higher dosages in certain applications. In some cases, fly ash can add to the concrete's final strength and increase its chemical resistance and durability.

Fly ash can significantly improve the workability of concrete. Recently, techniques have been developed to replace partial cement with high-volume fly ash (50% cement replacement). For roller-compacted concrete (RCC)[used in dam construction], replacement values of 70% have been achieved with processed fly ash at the Ghatghar dam project in Maharashtra, India. Due to the spherical shape of fly ash particles, it can increase workability of cement while reducing water demand. Proponents of fly ash claim that replacing Portland cement with fly ash reduces the greenhouse gas "footprint" of concrete, as the production of one ton of Portland cement generates approximately one ton of CO_{2}, compared to no CO_{2} generated with fly ash. New fly ash production, i.e., the burning of coal, produces approximately 20 to 30 tons of CO_{2} per ton of fly ash. Since the worldwide production of Portland cement is expected to reach nearly 2 billion tons by 2010, replacement of any large portion of this cement by fly ash could significantly reduce carbon emissions associated with construction, as long as the comparison takes the production of fly ash as a given.

In addition to coal combustion, fly ash derived from municipal solid waste incineration (MSWI) can serve as a supplementary cementitious material to replace clinker in cement manufacturing. Pre-treatments, such as hydrothermal washing or calcination and vitrification, are applied to remove chlorides and heavy metals. Replacing clinker with treated MSWI fly ash can reduce the global warming potential of cement production by up to 55%, while the hardening of the hydraulic binder immobilizes heavy metals within its crystal structure.

=== Embankment ===
Fly ash properties are unusual among engineering materials. Unlike soils typically used for embankment construction, fly ash has a large uniformity coefficient and it consists of clay-sized particles. Engineering properties that affect the use of fly ash in embankments include grain size distribution, compaction characteristics, shear strength, compressibility, permeability, and frost susceptibility. Nearly all the types of fly ash used in embankments are Class F.

=== Soil stabilization ===
Soil stabilization is the permanent physical and chemical alteration of soils to enhance their physical properties. Stabilization can increase the shear strength of a soil and/or control the shrink-swell properties of a soil, thus improving the load-bearing capacity of a sub-grade to support pavements and foundations. Stabilization can be used to treat a wide range of sub-grade materials from expansive clays to granular materials. Stabilization can be achieved with a variety of chemical additives including lime, fly ash, and Portland cement. Proper design and testing is an important component of any stabilization project. This allows for the establishment of design criteria, and determination of the proper chemical additive and admixture rate that achieves the desired engineering properties. Stabilization process benefits can include: Higher resistance (R) values, Reduction in plasticity, Lower permeability, Reduction of pavement thickness, Elimination of excavation – material hauling/handling – and base importation, Aids compaction, Provides "all-weather" access onto and within projects sites. Another form of soil treatment closely related to soil stabilization is soil modification, sometimes referred to as "mud drying" or soil conditioning. Although some stabilization inherently occurs in soil modification, the distinction is that soil modification is merely a means to reduce the moisture content of a soil to expedite construction, whereas stabilization can substantially increase the shear strength of a material such that it can be incorporated into the project's structural design. The determining factors associated with soil modification vs soil stabilization may be the existing moisture content, the end use of the soil structure and ultimately the cost benefit provided. Equipment for the stabilization and modification processes include: chemical additive spreaders, soil mixers (reclaimers), portable pneumatic storage containers, water trucks, deep lift compactors, motor graders.

=== Flowable fill ===
Fly ash is also used as a component in the production of flowable fill (also called controlled low strength material, or CLSM), which is used as self-leveling, self-compact backfill material in lieu of compacted earth or granular fill. The strength of flowable fill mixes can range from 50 to 1,200 lbf/in^{2} (0.3 to 8.3 MPa), depending on the design requirements of the project in question. Flowable fill includes mixtures of Portland cement and filler material, and can contain mineral admixtures. Fly ash can replace either the Portland cement or fine aggregate (in most cases, river sand) as a filler material. High fly ash content mixes contain nearly all fly ash, with a small percentage of Portland cement and enough water to make the mix flowable. Low fly ash content mixes contain a high percentage of filler material, and a low percentage of fly ash, Portland cement, and water. Class F fly ash is best suited for high fly ash content mixes, whereas Class C fly ash is almost always used in low fly ash content mixes.

=== Asphalt concrete ===
Asphalt concrete is a composite material consisting of an asphalt binder and mineral aggregate commonly used to surface roads. Both Class F and Class C fly ash can typically be used as a mineral filler to fill the voids and provide contact points between larger aggregate particles in asphalt concrete mixes. This application is used in conjunction, or as a replacement for, other binders (such as Portland cement or hydrated lime). For use in asphalt pavement, the fly ash must meet mineral filler specifications outlined in ASTM D242. The hydrophobic nature of fly ash gives pavements better resistance to stripping. Fly ash has also been shown to increase the stiffness of the asphalt matrix, improving rutting resistance and increasing mix durability.

=== Filler for thermoplastics ===
Coal and shale oil fly ashes have been used as a filler for thermoplastics that could be used for injection molding applications.

=== Geopolymers ===
In 2021 it was reported that fly ash has been used as a component in geopolymers, where the reactivity of the fly ash glasses can be used to create a binder similar to a hydrated Portland cement in appearance, but with potentially superior properties, including reduced CO_{2} emissions, depending on the formulation.

=== Roller compacted concrete ===
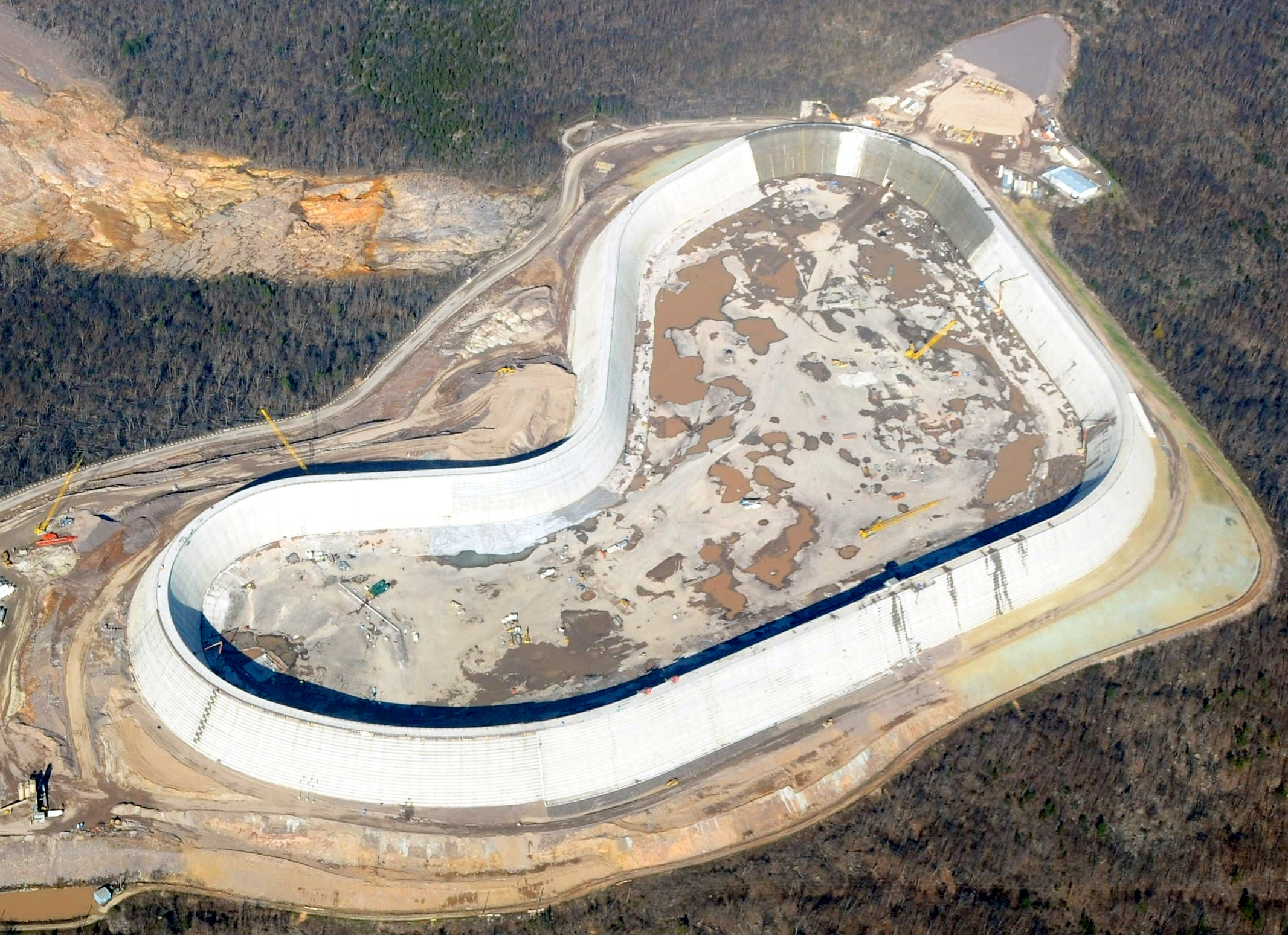
The upper reservoir of Ameren's Taum Sauk hydroelectric plant was constructed of roller-compacted concrete that included fly ash from one of Ameren's coal plants.

Another application of using fly ash is in roller-compacted concrete dams. Many dams in the US have been constructed with high fly ash contents. Fly ash lowers the heat of hydration allowing thicker placements to occur. Data for these can be found at the US Bureau of Reclamation. This has also been demonstrated in the Ghatghar Dam Project in India.

=== Bricks ===
There are several techniques for manufacturing construction bricks from fly ash, producing a wide variety of products. One type of fly ash brick is manufactured by mixing fly ash with an equal amount of clay, then firing in a kiln at about 1000 °C. This approach has the principal benefit of reducing the amount of clay required. Another type of fly ash brick is made by mixing soil, plaster of Paris, fly ash and water, and allowing the mixture to dry. Because no heat is required, this technique reduces air pollution. More modern manufacturing processes use a greater proportion of fly ash, and a high pressure manufacturing technique, which produces high strength bricks with environmental benefits.

In the United Kingdom, fly ash has been used for over fifty years to make concrete block. They are widely used for the inner skin of cavity walls. They are naturally more thermally insulating than blocks made with other aggregates.

Ash bricks have been used in house construction in Windhoek, Namibia, since the 1970s. There is, however, a problem with the bricks in that they tend to fail or produce unsightly pop-outs. This happens when the bricks come into contact with moisture and a chemical reaction occurs causing the bricks to expand.

In India, fly ash bricks are used for construction. Leading manufacturers use an industrial standard known as "Pulverized fuel ash for lime-Pozzolana mixture" using over 75% post-industrial recycled waste, and a compression process. This produces a strong product with good insulation properties and environmental benefits.

=== Metal matrix composites ===
Fly ash particles have proved their potential as good reinforcement with aluminum alloys and show the improvement of physical and mechanical properties. In particular, the compression strength, tensile strength, and hardness increase when the percentage of fly ash content is increased, whereas the density decreases. The presence of fly ash cenospheres in a pure Al matrix decreases its coefficient of thermal expansion (CTE).

=== Mineral extraction ===
It may be possible to use vacuum distillation in order to extract germanium and tungsten from fly ash and recycle them.

=== Waste treatment and stabilization ===
Fly ash, in view of its alkalinity and water absorption capacity, may be used in combination with other alkaline materials to transform sewage sludge into organic fertilizer or biofuel.

=== Catalyst ===
Fly ash, when treated with sodium hydroxide, appears to function well as a catalyst for converting polyethylene into substance similar to crude oil in a high-temperature process called pyrolysis and utilized in waste water treatment.

In addition, fly ash, mainly class C, may be used in the stabilization/solidification process of hazardous wastes and contaminated soils. For example, the Rhenipal process uses fly ash as an admixture to stabilize sewage sludge and other toxic sludges. This process has been used since 1996 to stabilize large amounts of chromium(VI) contaminated leather sludges in Alcanena, Portugal.

== Environmental impacts ==
The majority of CCPs are landfilled, placed in mine shafts or stored in ash ponds at coal-fired power plants. As a result, they can enter into the environment via suspension in air or through release into water.

=== CCP contaminants and their impacts ===
Fly ash contains trace concentrations of heavy metals and other substances that are known to be detrimental to human and ecosystem health in sufficient quantities. Potentially toxic trace elements in coal include arsenic, beryllium, cadmium, barium, chromium, copper, lead, mercury, molybdenum, nickel, radium, selenium, thorium, uranium, vanadium, and zinc. The effect of fly ash on the environment can vary based on the thermal power plant where it is produced, as well as the proportion of fly ash to bottom ash in the waste product. This is due to the different chemical make-up of the coal based on the geology of the area the coal is found and the burning process of the coal in the power plant.

==== Air ====
Because fly ash particles are small (<2.5 μm) they can become suspended in the air easily. It can be carried over large distances affecting local and global populations. These particles can then be inhaled by humans and due to their small size can travel far through the pulmonary system where they can cause cardiovascular disorders or potentially lung cancer. If they enter the lymphatic system, they can enter into the bloodstream. Additionally, airborne particles can lead to water contamination. Crystalline silica and lime along with toxic chemicals represent exposure risks to human health and the environment. Fly ash contains crystalline silica which is known to cause lung disease, in particular silicosis, if inhaled. Crystalline silica is listed by the IARC and US National Toxicology Program as a known human carcinogen.

==== Water ====
As described previously, fly ash can contain enhanced concentrations of heavy metals which results in a significant potential for pollution. The most common techniques for disposing of fly ash is in landfills or settling ponds. Fly ash can contaminate surface water through erosion, surface runoff, airborne particles landing on the water surface, contaminated ground water moving into surface waters, flooding drainage, or discharge from a coal ash pond. In surface waters where aquatic organisms live, these trace metals are taken up through direct ingestion or diffusion through the skin or gills. From there, trace metals can enter the bloodstream and eventually organs such as the liver or kidney where they bioaccumulate. Depending on the amount of heavy metals ingested, aquatic organisms can experience neurological complications, organ damage, or death. Bioaccumulation is enhanced further up the food chain and can eventually impact humans through our food supply, leading to disease or cancer. Groundwater is often the source for drinking water, so heavy metal contamination in groundwater can have detrimental effects on human health.

==== Soil ====
Coal creates an alkaline dust when combusted, with a pH ranging from 8 to 12. Fly ash dust can be deposited on topsoil increasing the pH and affecting the plants and animals in the surrounding ecosystem. Soils contaminated by fly ash showed an increase in bulk density and water capacity, but a decrease in hydraulic conductivity and cohesiveness. The effect of fly ash on soils and microorganisms in the soils are influenced by the pH of the ash and trace metal concentrations in the ash. Microbial communities in contaminated soil have shown reductions in respiration and nitrification. These contaminated soils can be detrimental or beneficial to plant development. Fly ash typically has beneficial outcomes when it corrects nutrient deficiencies in the soil. Most detrimental effects were observed when boron phytotoxicity occurs.

==== Plants ====
Fly ash can be used as a soil additive as described above. Although fly ash addition can increase plant biomass when the ash-to-soil ratio is low, it can result in a decline in plant biomass at higher ratios. Studies have shown that elevated fly ash levels reduced seedling height as well as root and leaf length. High ash exposure has been found to reduce the efficiency of photosynthesis.

==== Spills and releases ====
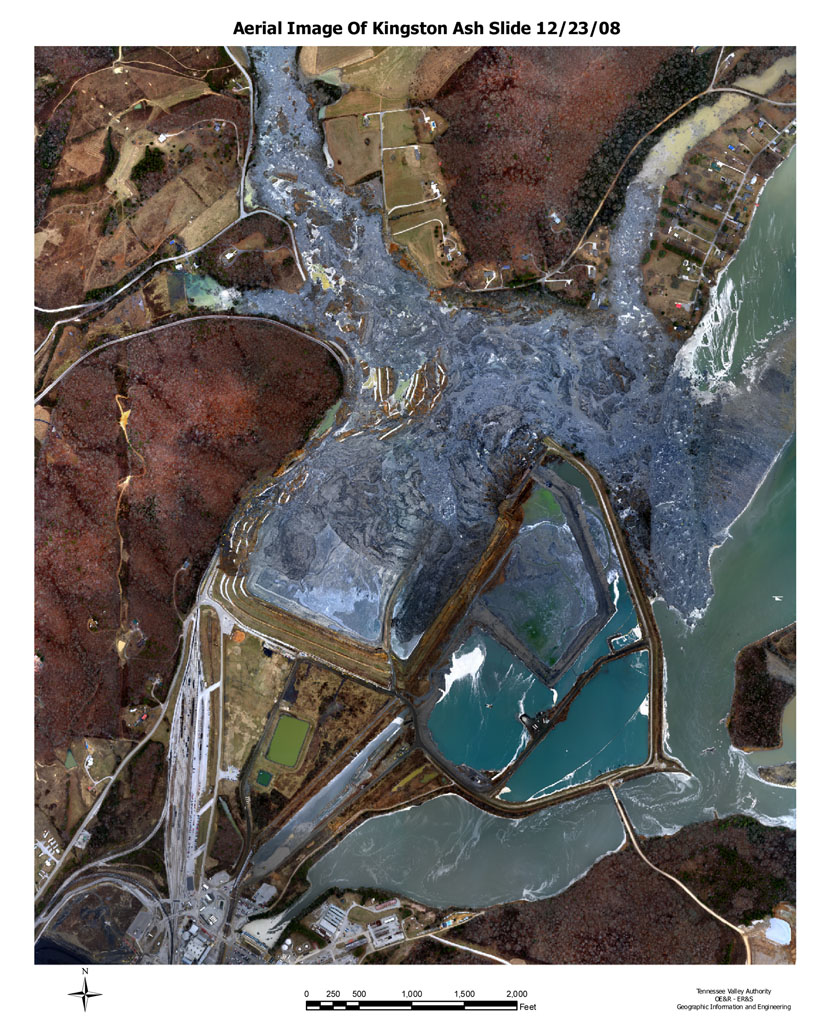
Tennessee Valley Authority Fly Ash containment failure on 23 December 2008 in Kingston, Tennessee

Where fly ash is stored in bulk, it is usually stored wet rather than dry to minimize fugitive dust. The resulting impoundments (ash ponds) are typically large and stable for long periods, but any breach of their dams or bunding is rapid and on a massive scale.

===== United States of America =====
Location	Company, Plant	Year	Contamination	Status
Gambrills, Maryland	Constellation Energy, Brandon Shores Generating Station	2008	Groundwater, heavy metals	The Maryland Department of the Environment issued a fine of $1 million to Constellation. Nearby residents filed a lawsuit against Constellation and in 2008 the company settled the case for $54 million.
Dukeville, North Carolina	Buck Stream Station	2014	Groundwater; fly ash	N/A
Illinois	Many, not described	N/A	Groundwater, rivers, lakes; Al, As, Bo, Ca, Mn, Se, N, $\ce{SO4^2-{}}$	The hazardous toxic chemicals dumped into the water in Illinois by these coal ash dumpsites include more than 300,000 pounds of aluminum, 600 pounds of arsenic, nearly 300,000 pounds of boron, over 200 pounds of cadmium, over 15,000 pounds of manganese, roughly 1,500 pounds of selenium, roughly 500,000 pounds of nitrogen, and nearly 40 million pounds of sulfate, according to a report by the Environmental Integrity Project, Earthjustice, the Prairie Rivers Network, and the Sierra Club.
Tennessee	Kingston Fossil Plant	2008	Emory and Clinch Rivers, fly ash	1.1 billion gallons of coal ash. It is the largest industrial spill in the U.S.
Texas	16 coal-burning power plants	N/A	Groundwater, As, Co, Li	At 12 of the 16 sites, the EIP analysis found levels of arsenic in the groundwater 10 times higher than the EPA Maximum Contaminant Level; arsenic has been found to cause several types of cancer. At 10 of the sites, lithium, which causes neurological disease, was found in the groundwater at concentrations more than 1,000 micrograms per liter, which is 25 times the maximum acceptable level. The report concludes that the fossil fuel industry in Texas has failed to comply with federal regulations on coal ash processing, and state regulators have failed to protect the groundwater.

== Human health impacts ==
The National Academy of Sciences noted in 2007 that "the presence of high contaminant levels in many CCR (coal combustion residue) leachates may create human health and ecological concerns".

=== Lead (Pb) ===
Lead is a hazardous heavy metal found in fly ash, which is highly mobile in the environment. If released from a CCP, it can contaminate water systems and soils, harming marine life and reducing biodiversity. Lead exposure in living organisms can damage blood circulation, the central nervous system, kidneys, and the heart. Even at low exposure levels, Pb exposure can inhibit heme synthesis, thereby impacting neurological function. Exposure to Pb is particularly dangerous for children.

=== Mercury (Hg) ===
Mercury is also a potential constituent of CCPs. It is released during the coal combustion process as elemental Hg, particle bound Hg, or oxidized Hg^{2+}. Elemental Hg is highly reactive. If released into a water system, elemental Hg from CCPs can react with bacteria and be converted to methy mercury (MeHg). MeHg moves through the food chain and can bioaccumulate in mammals. This is harmful because Hg is a neurotoxin. MeHg exposure is particularly of concern during pregnancy.

=== Arsenic (As) ===
Arsenic exists in many oxidation states and therefore can engage in many chemical reactions. The impact of As on health is highly dependent on its oxidation state. Direct ingestion of As by humans can result in acute toxicity which can be mild such as vomitting or nausea or extreme such as psychosis. Chronic exposure can cause heart failure or blood diseases such as leukopenia.

Material Safety Data Sheets recommend a number of safety precautions be taken when handling or working with fly ash. These include wearing protective goggles, respirators and disposable clothing and avoiding agitating the fly ash in order to minimize the amount which becomes airborne.

== Regulations ==
=== United States of America ===
==== Solid waste ====
In 1980 the U.S. Congress defined coal ash as a "special waste" that would not be regulated under the stringent hazardous waste permitting requirements under Subtitle C of the Resource Conservation and Recovery Act (RCRA). In its amendments to RCRA, Congress directed the Environmental Protection Agency (EPA) to study the special waste issue and make a determination as to whether stricter permit regulation was necessary. In 2000, EPA stated that coal fly ash did not need to be regulated as a hazardous waste. As a result, most power plants were not required to install geomembranes or leachate collection systems in ash ponds. Following many contamination incidents (described in Spills and releases), EPA published a Coal Combustion Residuals (CCR) regulation in 2015. The agency continued to classify coal ash as non-hazardous (thereby avoiding the strict Subtitle C requirements), but with new restrictions:

1. Existing ash ponds that are contaminating groundwater must stop receiving CCR, and close or retrofit with a liner.
2. Existing ash ponds and landfills must comply with structural and location restrictions, where applicable, or close.
3. A pond no longer receiving CCR is still subject to all regulations unless it is dewatered and covered by 2018.
4. New ponds and landfills must include a geomembrane liner over a layer of compacted soil.

The regulation was designed to prevent pond failures and protect groundwater. Enhanced inspection, record keeping and monitoring was required. Procedures for closure were also included and included capping, liners, and dewatering. Some of the provisions in the 2015 CCR regulation were challenged in litigation, and the United States Court of Appeals for the District of Columbia Circuit remanded certain portions of the regulation to EPA for further rulemaking.

In response to the court remand, EPA published its "CCR Part A" final rule on August 28, 2020, requiring all unlined ash ponds to be retrofitted with liners, or close by April 11, 2021. Some facilities were allowed to apply to obtain additional time—up to 2028—to find alternatives for managing ash wastes before closing their surface impoundments. EPA published its "CCR Part B" rule on November 12, 2020, which would allow certain facilities to use an alternative liner, based on a demonstration that human health and the environment will not be affected. Several facilities applied, within a December 14, 2020 deadline, for alternate liner demonstrations. In 2023 EPA proposed to deny six of the applications. In January 2025 EPA denied the application submitted for the Coronado Generating Station in Arizona, but in February 2026 announced that it will consider an approval for the facility, based on newly-submitted information. As of early 2026 EPA has not made final determinations on other applications.

In 2024 EPA issued a final CCR regulation for "legacy" or inactive surface impoundments. On November 28, 2025, EPA proposed a three-year extension of the compliance deadline (from 2028 to 2031) for certain active surface impoundments.

==== Wastewater ====
In 2020 EPA published a final effluent guidelines rule under the Clean Water Act, that reversed some provisions of its 2015 wastewater regulation, which had tightened requirements on toxic metals discharged from ash ponds and other power plant wastestreams. The 2020 rule was also challenged in litigation. In 2024 the agency published a final rule that reversed some aspects of the 2020 rule and imposed more stringent wastewater limitations for some facilities, covering flue gas desulfurization wastewater, bottom ash transport water, and combustion residual leachate. In December 2025 EPA extended several compliance deadlines in the 2024 rule.

=== China ===
In China, the largest producer of fly ash, management is overseen by The National Development and Reform Commission and the Ministry of Environmental Protection. The ash is classified as a solid waste, which can be stored in designated facilities if not recycled. However, there has been concern over these facilities' proximity to residential areas, in violation of storage regulations.

=== European Union ===
The EU established the European Waste Catalogue (EWC) to classify waste based on type and production method which, as of 2014, was required to be incorporated into member-state legislation. Under the EWC, fly ash is also designated as non-hazardous.

=== India ===
The Ministry of Environment, Forest and Climate Change of India first published a gazette notification in 1999 specifying use of fly ash and mandating a target date for all thermal power plants to comply by ensuring 100% utilisation. Subsequent amendments in 2003 and 2009 shifted the deadline for compliance to 2014. As reported by Central Electricity Authority, New Delhi, as of 2015, only 60% of fly ash produced was being utilised. This has resulted in the latest notification in 2015 which has set December 31, 2017, as the revised deadline to achieve 100% utilisation. Out of the approximately 55.7% fly ash utilised, bulk of it (42.3%) goes into cement production whereas only about 0.74% is used as an additive in concrete.

Researchers in India are actively addressing this challenge by working on fly ash as an admixture for concrete and activated pozzolanic cement such as geopolymer to help achieve the target of 100% utilisation. The biggest scope clearly lies in the area of increasing the quantity of fly ash being incorporated in concrete. India produced 280 Million Tonnes of Cement in 2016 . With housing sector consuming 67% of the cement, there is a huge scope for incorporating fly ash in both the increasing share of PPC and low to moderate strength concrete. There is a misconception that the Indian codes IS 456:2000 for Concrete and Reinforced Concrete and IS 3812.1:2013 for Fly Ash restrict the use of Fly Ash to less than 35%. Similar misconceptions exists in countries like US but evidence to the contrary is the use of HVFA in many large projects where design mixes have been used under strict quality control. It is suggested that in order to make the most of the research results presented in the paper, Ultra High Volume Fly ash Concrete (UHVFA) concrete is urgently developed for widespread use in India using local fly ash.

== In the geologic record ==
Due to the ignition of coal deposits by the Siberian Traps during the Permian–Triassic extinction event around 252 million years ago, large amounts of char very similar to modern fly ash were released into the oceans, which is preserved in the geologic record in marine deposits located in the Canadian High Arctic. It has been hypothesised that the fly ash could have resulted in toxic environmental conditions.

== See also ==
- Alkali–silica reaction (ASR)
- Alkali–aggregate reaction
- Cement
- Cenosphere – a CCP, often recycled
- Coal waste
- Energetically modified cement (EMC)
- Health effects of coal ash
- Pozzolanic reaction
- Silica fume
- Cenocell
