= Morning Show Mysteries =

- Genre: Mystery film
- Based on: Billie Blessing series by Al Roker
- Written by: Shelley Evans; Amber Benson
- Directed by: Terry Ingram; Kevin Fair; Andy Mikita
- Starring: Holly Robinson Peete; Rick Fox; Colin Lawrence
- Original language: English
- No. of episodes: 6

Original release
- Network: Hallmark Movies & Mysteries
- Release: January 21, 2018 – May 23, 2021

Morning Show Mysteries is a series which airs on Hallmark Movies & Mysteries channel. Hallmark announced its first mystery series starring people of color on July 31, 2017. The episodes are based on the Billy Blessing novels by Al Roker. They star Holly Robinson Peete, Rick Fox and Colin Lawrence. The first aired in 2018.

== Series overview ==
The theme for the Morning Show Mysteries series centers around a Seattle-based, TV chef Billie Blessings (Robinson Peete) as she becomes involved in various murder criminal investigations, and her relationship with police detective Ian Jackson (Fox) who is in charge of the homicide unit.

As of 2021, Rick Fox left the series and was replaced by Colin Lawrence playing the new head of homicide, Detective Sergeant Tyrell Price.

== Cast and characters ==
- Belinda "Billie" Blessings (Holly Robinson Peete) is a chef, restaurant owner, and morning show segment host.
- Ian Jackson (Rick Fox) is a police detective in charge of the homicide unit. (2018–2019)
- Cassandra "Cassie" Shaw (Karen Robinson) is Billie's aunt and manages her restaurant, Blessings Kitchen.
- Maurice (Greg Rogers) is a former convict who now cooks for Blessings Kitchen and has a dog named Feathers.
- Phil (Jesse Moss) is a producer on the morning TV show and often helps Billie investigate the murders.
- Lance (David Lewis) is a co-host on the morning TV show.
- Wallace "Wally (Osric Chau)
- Tyrell Price (Colin Lawrence) is the new head of Homicide after Ian leaves.

== List of episodes ==
No.	Title	Directed by	Written by	Original release date
1	"Morning Show Mystery: Mortal Mishaps"	Terry Ingram	Shelley Evans	January 21, 2018
Someone bakes a poisoned cake. Rudy gets the cake after Billie shows it in TV Morning Show. He dies in Billie's family restaurant. Billie's being framed. She investigates.
2	"Morning Show Mysteries: Murder on the Menu"	Kevin Fair	Shelley Evans	July 22, 2018
When a dead body turns up in the car of one of her guests, a temperamental celebrity chef, Billie Blessings is on the case again.
3	"Morning Show Mysteries: A Murder in Mind"	Kevin Fair	Amber Benson	April 14, 2019
Billie Blessings searches for the real killer, when her friend is accused of murder.
4	"Morning Show Mysteries: Countdown to Murder"	Kevin Fair	Shelley Evans	April 21, 2019
The murder of a supermarket owner puts TV chef Billie Blessings and Detective Ian Jackson on the trail of a possible serial killer, while they come to terms with their blossoming romance.
5	"Morning Show Mysteries: Death by Design"	Kevin Fair	Amber Benson	April 28, 2019
Billie and Ian are on the case after Billie's best friend's twin sister is found strangled to death, with no shortage of suspects at hand.
6	"Morning Show Mysteries: Murder Ever After"	Andy Mikita	Shelley Evans	May 23, 2021
Billie finds a corpse in her friend's father's basement, and gets involved in the murder investigation.
