= Controlled low strength material =

Type of concrete mix

Controlled low strength material, abbreviated CLSM, also known as flowable fill, is a type of weak, runny concrete mix used in construction for non-structural purposes such as backfill or road bases.

== Description ==
CLSM consists of a mixture of Portland cement, water, aggregate and sometimes fly ash. Unlike ordinary concrete, CLSM has much lower strength. The strength of CLSM is less than 1,200 pounds per square inch (8.3 MPa), while ordinary concrete has strengths exceeding 3,000 pounds per square inch (21 MPa). As a result, CLSM is not suitable for supporting buildings, bridges, or other structures. Instead, it is primarily used as a replacement for compacted backfill. It also flows much better than ordinary concrete, having the consistency of a milkshake. The first known use of CLSM was in 1964. CLSM is typically a ready mix concrete rather than soil cement which is a low strength cement made using local soil, and is similar to a slurry.

== Transportation ==
CLSM as a highway construction material is becoming more widespread throughout the United States. Data received from questionnaires sent by the Pennsylvania Department of Transportation (PennDOT) in 1991 and the Transportation Research Board (TRB) in 1992 indicated that approximately 30 states had some experience with the use of flowable fill, and at least 24 states have a specification for flowable fill.

Most state transportation agencies have used flowable fill mainly as a trench backfill for storm drainage and utility lines on street and highway projects. Flowable fill has also been used to backfill abutments and retaining walls, fill abandoned pipelines and utility vaults, cavities, and settled areas, and help to convert abandoned bridges into culverts. The most frequent use of flowable fill is reported in the states of Minnesota, Maryland, Michigan, Iowa, and Indiana.

Although most states have somewhat limited experience to date with flowable fill, nearly all states that have used the material have thus far indicated satisfactory performance with little or no problems. Several states have noted that metal or plastic pipes tend to float unless anchored, and some states have reported some resistance to the use of the material by contractors or engineers. Since flowable fill is normally a comparatively low-strength material, there are no strict quality requirements for fly ash used in flowable fill or controlled low strength material mixtures. Fly ash is well suited for use in flowable fill mixtures. Its fine particle sizing (nonplastic silt) and spherical particle shape enhances mix flowability. Its relatively low dry unit weight (usually in the 890 to 1300 kg/m3 (55 to 80 lb/ft3) range) assists in producing a relatively lightweight fill, and its pozzolanic or cementitious properties provide for lower cement requirements than would normally be required to achieve equivalent strengths.

== Fly ash flowable fill mixes ==
There are two basic types of flowable fill mixes that contain fly ash: high fly ash content mixes and low fly ash content mixes.

There are no specific requirements for the types of fly ash that may be used in flowable fill mixtures. "Low lime" or Class F fly ash is well suited for use in high fly ash content mixes, but can also be used in low fly ash content mixes. "High lime" or Class C fly ash, because it is usually self-cementing, is almost always used only in low fly ash content flowable fill mixes. There is also a flowable fill product in which both Class F and Class C fly ash are used in varying mix proportions.
