= Deborah Roberts =

American television journalist (born 1960)

- Roberts in 2026
- Born: September 20, 1960 (age 66); Perry, Georgia, U.S.
- Education: University of Georgia (BA)
- Occupation: Journalist
- Years active: 1982–present
- Notable credit(s): 20/20 co-anchor Dateline NBC correspondent Lifetime Live host
- Spouse: Al Roker (m. 1995)
- Children: 2
- Website: Deborah Roberts ABC News profile

Deborah Ann Roberts (born September 20, 1960) is an American television journalist for the ABC News division of the ABC broadcast television network.

== Early life and education ==
Roberts was born in Perry, Georgia to Benjamin Roberts, a business owner, and Ruth Roberts, a housewife. She graduated from the Henry W. Grady College of Journalism and Mass Communication at the University of Georgia with a Bachelor of Journalism in 1982. In 1992, Roberts was awarded the University of Georgia Distinguished Alumnus Award for her rapid success as a journalist.

== Career ==
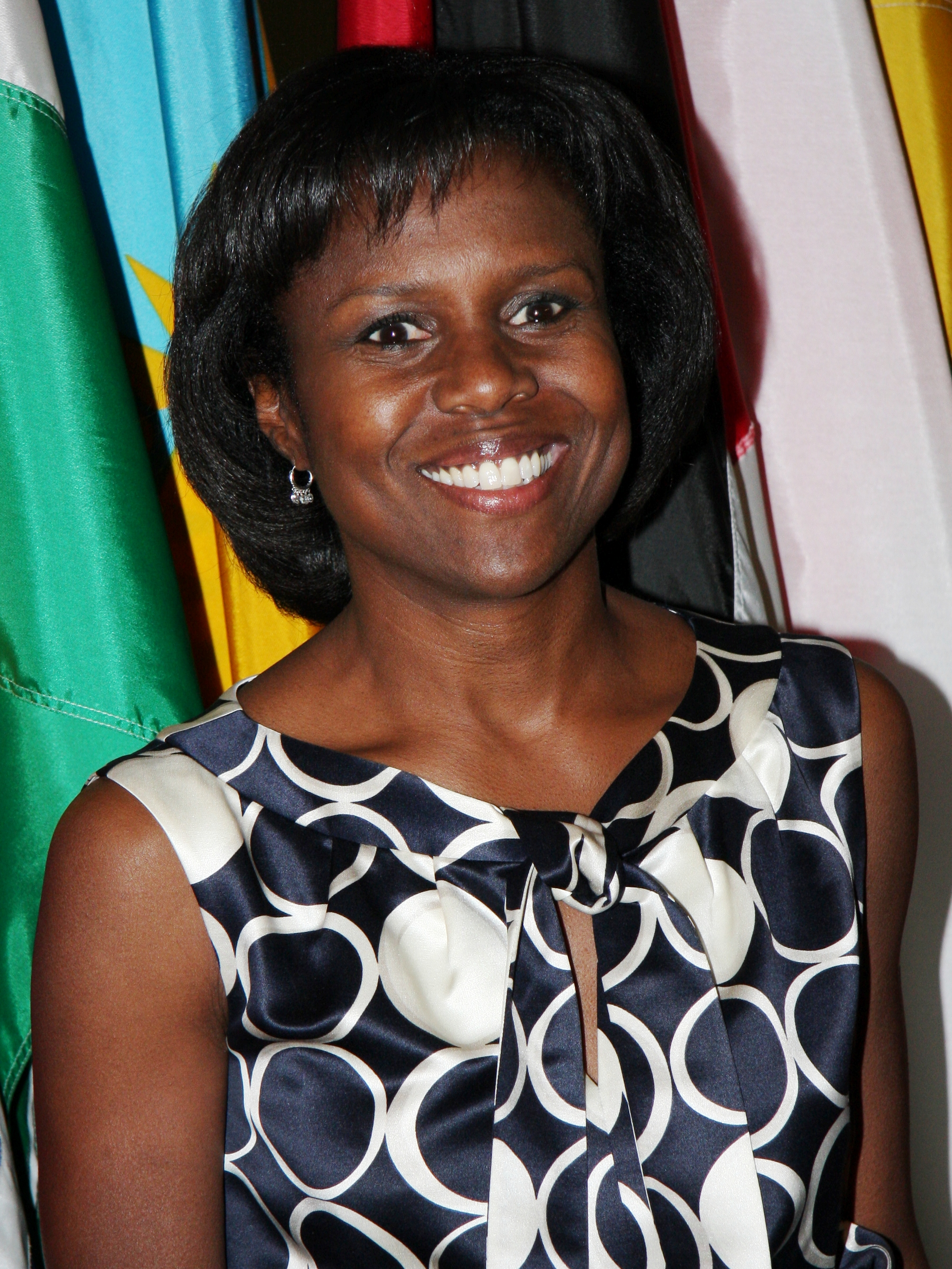
Roberts in May 2009

In 1982, Roberts began her career at WTVM, a local television station in Columbus, Georgia, and then she moved on to work at WBIR, a local television station in Knoxville, Tennessee.

From 1987 to 1990, she was bureau chief/NASA field reporter/weekend news co-anchor at WFTV, a local television station in Orlando, Florida. In 1990, she joined NBC News as a general-assignment reporter and later was a correspondent for Dateline NBC, an NBC News newsmagazine program.

Roberts moved to ABC News in 1995 as a correspondent for 20/20, a newsmagazine program, as well as an anchor for World News Tonight Weekend, the weekend evening news program, and for Good Morning America, the morning news program. In July and September 2006, she was a guest host on The View, a talk show produced by ABC Daytime, a division of ABC.

Roberts has won an Emmy Award and a Clarion Award for her reporting.

Roberts has contributed to the network's other platforms, including Primetime, Nightline and The Katie Couric Show.

Roberts hosts Lifetime Live on Lifetime Television, a cable and satellite television channel.

In 2016, the non-fiction book, Been There, Done That: Family Wisdom for Modern Times, written by Roberts and husband Al Roker, was published.

In 2021, Roberts received a Peabody Award for the 20/20 special report, "Say Her Name: Breonna Taylor."

== Personal life ==
Roberts resides in Manhattan with her husband Al Roker, whom she married in September 1995. They are the parents of daughter Leila (b. November 17, 1998) and son Nicholas (b. July 18, 2002). Roberts has a stepdaughter from her husband's prior marriage. The couple live in a townhouse on Manhattan's Upper East Side and also own a house in the foothills of the Berkshires.

== See also ==
- New Yorkers in journalism
