= Loss on ignition =

Test used in analytical chemistry

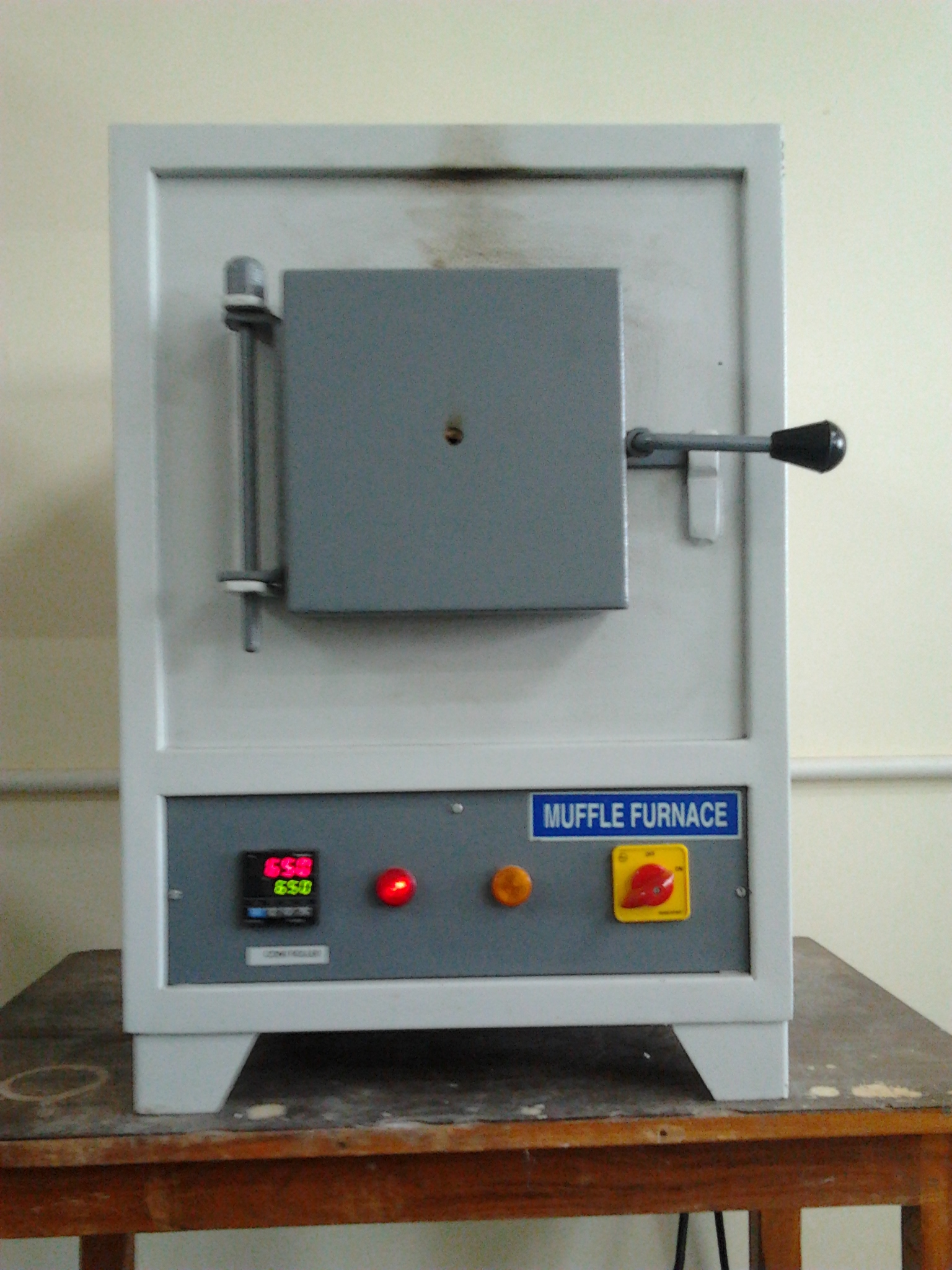
Temperature controlled furnace

Loss on ignition (LOI) is a test used in inorganic analytical chemistry and soil science, particularly in the analysis of minerals and the chemical makeup of soil. It consists of strongly heating ("igniting") a sample of the material at a specified temperature, allowing volatile substances to escape, until its mass ceases to change. This may be done in air or in some other reactive or inert atmosphere. The simple test typically consists of placing a few grams of the material in a tared, pre-ignited crucible and determining its mass, placing it in a temperature-controlled furnace for a set time, cooling it in a controlled (e.g., water-free, CO_{2}-free) atmosphere, and re-determining the mass. The process may be repeated to show that the mass change is complete. A variant of the test in which mass change is continually monitored as the temperature changes is called thermogravimetry.

== Theory ==
The loss on ignition is reported as part of an elemental or oxide analysis of a mineral. The volatile materials lost usually consist of 'combined water' (hydrates and labile hydroxy-compounds) and carbon dioxide from carbonates. It may be used as a quality test, commonly carried out for minerals such as iron ore. For example, the loss on ignition of fly ash is composed of contaminants and unburnt fuel.

In pyroprocessing industries such as lime, calcined bauxite, refractories or cement manufacture, the loss on ignition of the raw material is roughly equivalent to the mass loss it will experience in a kiln. Likewise, in minerals, the loss on ignition indicates the material actually lost during smelting or refining in a furnace or smelter. The loss on ignition of the product indicates the extent to which the pyroprocessing was incomplete. ASTM tests are defined for limestone and lime and cement among others.

== Procedure ==
Soil is composed of living organisms, water, carbonates, carbon containing material, decomposing matter and much more. To determine how much one of these soil components make up the entire soil mass, the LOI procedure is implemented. Initially, the researcher will take the mass of the sample prior to LOI and then place the sample into a heating device. Depending on what the researcher is trying to determine in the soil, the temperature of the device can be set to the corresponding temperature. The soil sample is kept at this temperature for an extended period of time after which it is removed and allowed to cool down before re-weighing the sample. The amount of mass lost after the LOI treatment is equal to the mass of the component the researcher is trying to determine. The typical set of materials needed to use LOI include: a high precision mass balance, a drying oven, temperature controlled furnace, preheated crucibles and soil sample from the location of interest.

There are many ways to properly utilize loss on ignition for scientific research. A soil sample left overnight in a drying oven at 100 °C would have its water content completely evaporated by morning. This could allow the researchers to determine the amount of water initially in the soil sample and its porosity by comparing the change in weight of the sample before and after the evaporation. This new weight of the sample is called the dry weight and its previous weight is called the wet weight.

=== Steps ===
A general procedure of how to perform a loss on ignition is as follows:

1. Weigh the empty crucible that the sample is to be placed in and record its weight in a lab book.
2. Place the sample in the empty crucible and weigh the crucible again with the sample in it. The new weight minus the empty crucible weight is the sample's wet weight.
3. Place the sample in the drying oven or blast furnace as required.
4. Set the oven or furnace to the desired temperature. If the researcher wants to find the dry weight of the soil then the furnace would need to be 100 °C.
5. Leave the sample in the furnace for the desired length of time. If the researcher wanted to know the sample's dry weight and is using a furnace set at 100 °C, then the researcher would usually leave the furnace on overnight.
6. Open the oven but also back away from it at the same time since the hot air escaping from the furnace can burn bare skin.
7. Allow the oven and sample to cool down before removing the sample from the oven.
8. Weigh the crucible with the sample again. Subtract the empty crucible weight from this new weight and that is the sample's dry weight.

== Application ==
Typically, this method is used to determine water content levels, carbon levels, amount of organic matter levels, amount of volatile compounds. LOI is also used in the cement industry which operates the furnace in the 950 °C range (e.g. cement kilns), combustion engineers also use LOI but at temperatures lower than 950 °C range.

== Safety ==
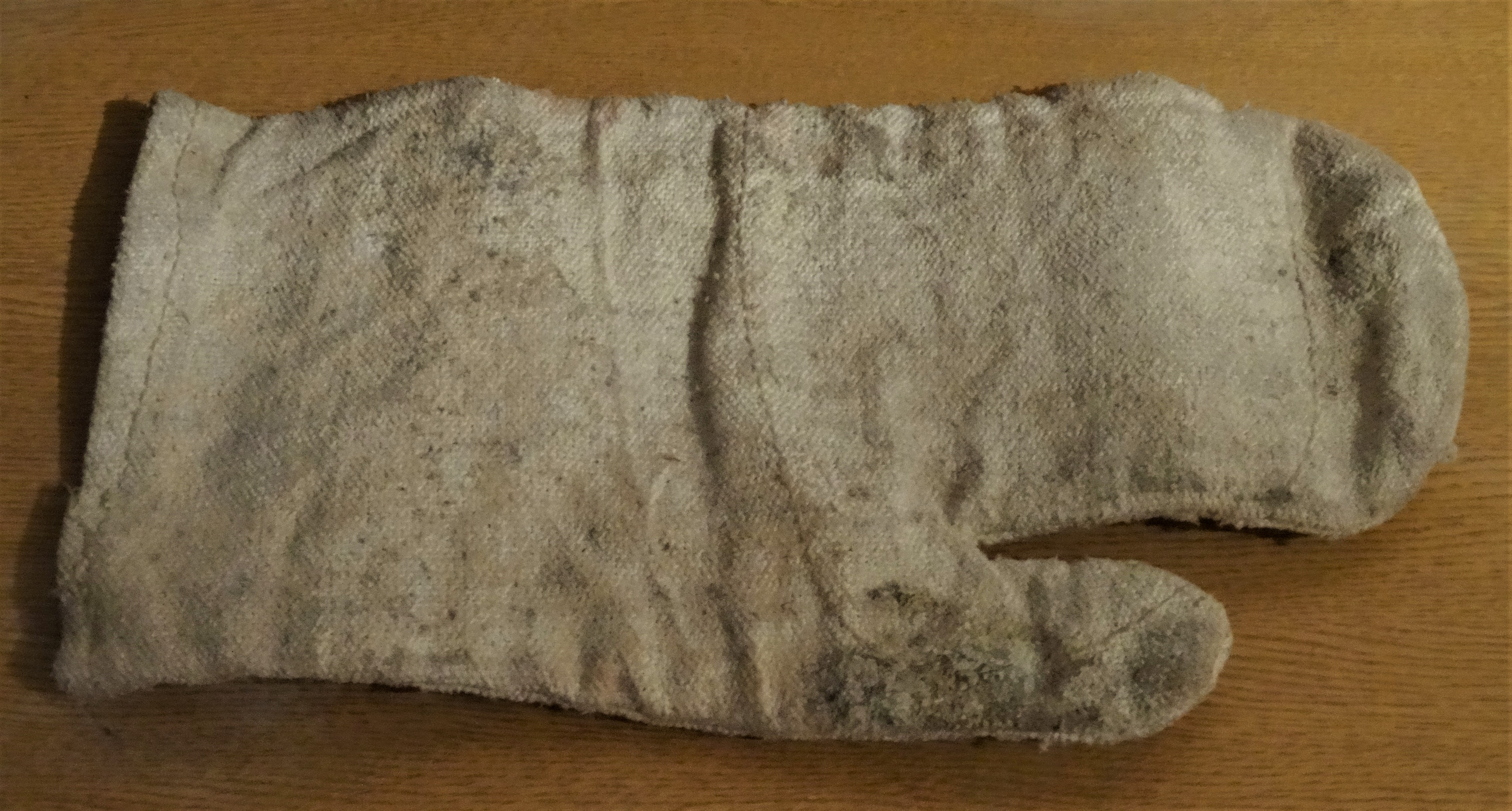
Asbestos gloves

In many research labs, the use of asbestos gloves is required when operating the furnace because it can reach very high temperatures. The use of face masks is also recommended at higher temperatures to ensure the safety of researchers and junior lab members. It is also recommended that researchers performing the LOI procedure remove all jewelry and watches as they are excellent conductors of heat. When removing samples at high temperatures, these accessories can easily heat up and result in burns.

== Other uses ==
The cement industry uses the LOI method by heating a cement sample to 900-1000 °C until the mass of the sample stabilizes. Once the mass stabilizes, the mass loss due to LOI is determined. This is usually done to assess the high water content in the cement or carbonation, as these factors diminish the quality of cement. High losses are generally attributed to poor cement storage conditions or manipulation of cement quality by suppliers. This practice ensures that the cement used on a site adheres to the correct composition, meeting safety protocols and customer requirements.

In the mining industry, the utilization of LOI is essential for determining the moisture and volatile material present in the rock. Thus, when performing whole-rock analysis to ascertain total volatiles, the LOI method is employed. To eliminate all volatiles and convert all iron into iron oxides, the LOI temperature is set at 900-1000 °C.
