= Al Roker =

American weather presenter, television and radio personality (born 1954)

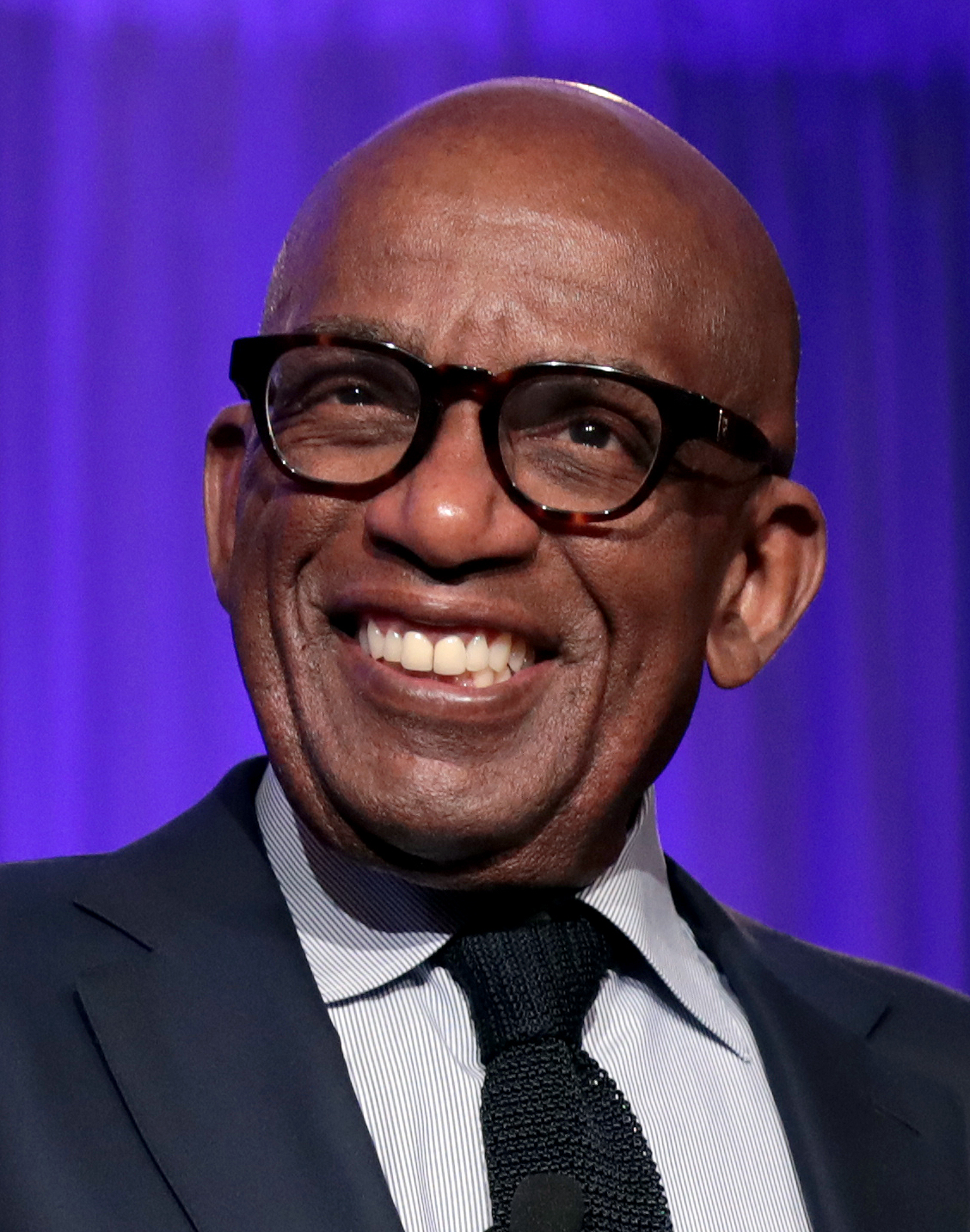
- Roker in 2022
- Born: Albert Lincoln Roker Jr. August 20, 1954 (age 72); New York City, U.S.
- Education: State University of New York at Oswego (BA)
- Occupations: Journalist; television personality; weather presenter; actor; author
- Years active: 1974–present
- Spouses: Mary Puglisi (m. 1976, divorced); Alice Bell (m. 1984, divorced); Deborah Roberts (m. 1995)
- Children: 3
- Relatives: Roxie Roker (paternal first cousin, once removed); Lenny Kravitz (paternal second cousin); Zoë Kravitz (paternal second cousin, once removed)
- Website: AlRoker.com

Albert Lincoln Roker Jr. (born August 20, 1954) is an American weather presenter, journalist, television personality, and author. He is the weather anchor on NBC's Today, and occasionally co-hosts 3rd Hour Today. He has a lapsed American Meteorological Society (AMS) Television Seal of Approval (#238).

== Early life ==
Roker was born in the borough of Queens, New York City, the son of Isabel, of Jamaican descent, and Albert Lincoln Roker Sr., a bus driver of Bahamian descent. He initially wanted to be a cartoonist. He was raised Catholic, his mother's faith, and graduated from Xavier High School in Manhattan. He attended the State University of New York (SUNY) at Oswego, where he received a B.A. in communications in 1976.

== Career ==
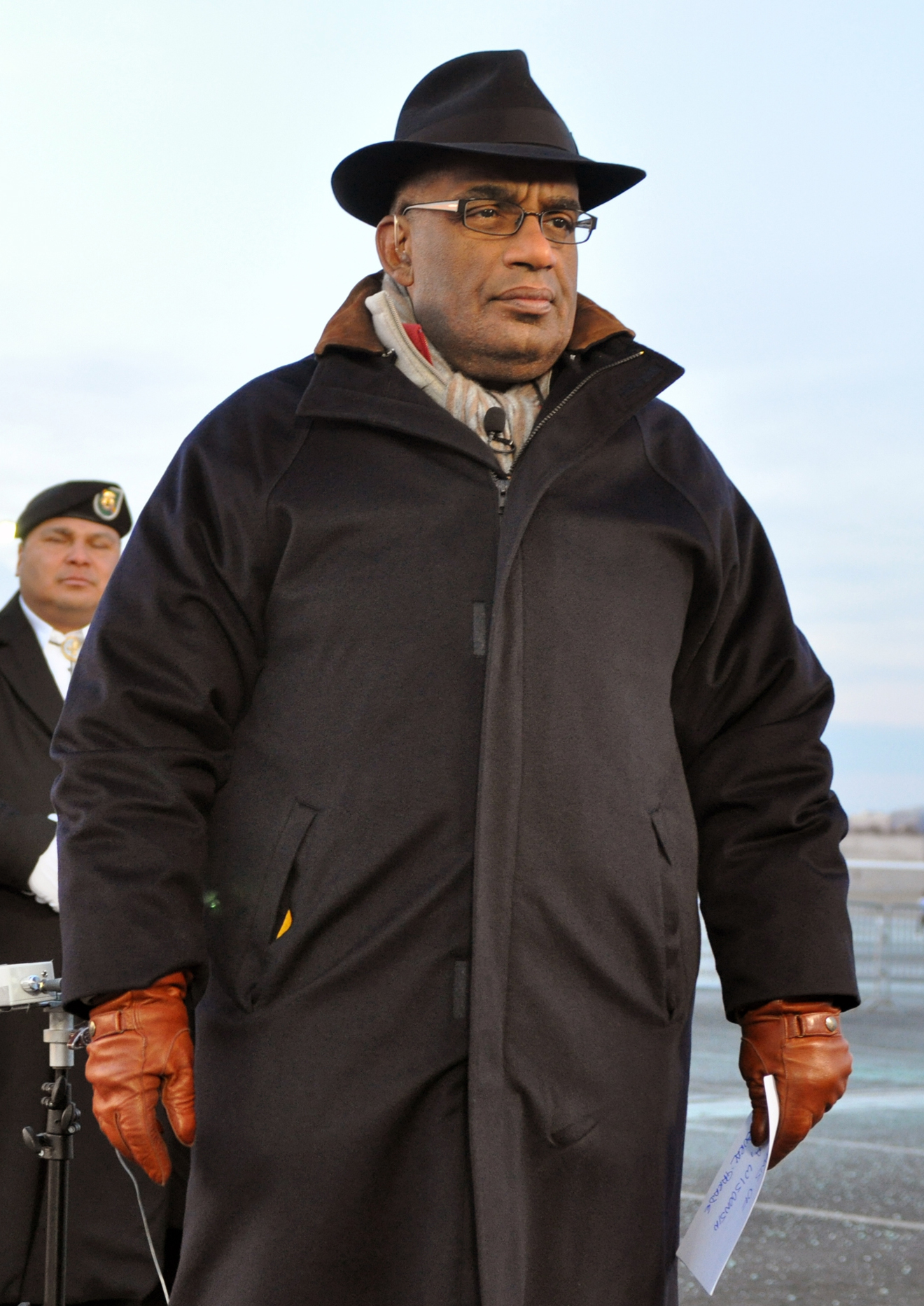
Roker outside the Pentagon during Barack Obama's 2009 Inauguration

=== Early career (1974–1995) ===
Roker worked as a weather anchor for CBS affiliate WHEN-TV (now WTVH) in Syracuse, New York, from 1974 until 1976, while he was enrolled at SUNY Oswego. During his time in Oswego, he also DJ'd at the campus radio station, WNYO. Following the completion of his studies, Roker moved to Washington, D.C., and took a weathercasting position at independent station WTTG, then owned by Metromedia, remaining there for much of the next two years.

Roker's career with NBC began in 1978 when he was hired at WKYC in Cleveland, then an NBC owned-and-operated station. After five years in Cleveland, Roker was promoted to the network's flagship outlet, WNBC-TV in his hometown. Roker returned to New York City in late 1983 as a weekend weathercaster, and within eight months became the station's regular weeknight weathercaster. Roker replaced 27-year WNBC-TV veteran Dr. Frank Field, who left the network over a contract dispute. From 1983 to 1996, Roker was the regular substitute for forecaster Joe Witte on the NBC News program NBC News at Sunrise, and from 1990 to 1995 filled in for Willard Scott, Bryant Gumbel and 1997 through the 2000s for Matt Lauer on the Today Show. In 1995, he became the host of The Al Roker Show, a weekend talk show on CNBC.

Roker received wider exposure when David Letterman asked him to join in an elevator race on an episode of the talk show Late Night with David Letterman, which taped across the hall from the WNBC news studio in the GE Building. This led to Roker becoming the forecaster for Weekend Today. He also substituted on the weekday edition of Today when Willard Scott was ill or away.

=== Full time on Today (1996–present) ===
In early 1996, Scott announced his semi-retirement from Today. On January 26, 1996, Roker received the regular weekday weather slot. Roker's studio remote forecasts, interviewing visitors outside and giving them some camera time, became a staple. Roker conducted more interviews and segments on the show over time. He continues the daily tradition of birthday wishes to centenarians that began with Scott.

In 2005, Roker reported from inside Hurricane Wilma. A popular viral video shows him swept off his feet by the fierce wind and clinging to the cameraman.

In addition to his role as Today Show weather man and anchor, Roker co-hosted the third hour of Today called Today's Take, beginning November 12, 2012. Today's Take was cancelled in February 2017 for Megyn Kelly Today and aired its final episode on September 22, 2017. After Megyn Kelly Today was cancelled in 2018, Roker returned to co-host 3rd Hour Today.

During the 2013 inauguration of Barack Obama, Roker received a handshake from Joe Biden. Years later, as an NBC News reporter at Biden's own 2021 inauguration, Roker received a fist bump from the newly inaugurated president moments before Biden entered the White House.

In November 2014, Roker embarked on a "Rokerthon", in which he did a non-stop, 34-hour weather forecast on NBC, from 10:05 p.m. on November 12, 2014, until about 8:00 a.m. on November 14, 2014. The record-setting event was a fundraiser for the Crowdrise Campaign to benefit the military and USO. He held a "Rokerthon 2", this time reporting weather from all 50 states and Washington, D.C. during the week from November 6 to November 13, 2015, in support of Feeding America. From March 27 until March 31, 2017, he embarked on "Rokerthon 3", visiting colleges and setting a Guinness World Record at each one, such as the longest conga line on ice and largest human letter.

== Other work ==
Roker has hosted NBC's coverage of the Macy's Thanksgiving Day Parade since 1995 (with the exception of 2022), where he provides commentary along with some of his Today Show colleagues. He is known as the "uptown" host, whose main roles include cutting the ribbon during the ribbon-cutting ceremony at the start of the parade, and interviewing celebrities who are watching the parade from its start at 77th Street. Roker was unable to host the coverage of the parade in 2022 after recovering from blood clots that had led to being hospitalized.

Roker is a game show fan. From 1996 to 1997, he hosted a game show on MSNBC called Remember This?. He substituted for Meredith Vieira for a week of Who Wants to Be a Millionaire shows from March 5–9, 2007.

In 2008, Roker hosted NBC's Celebrity Family Feud. He hosted a week-long feature on Today profiling five game shows and their hosts in July 2016 titled "Game On Today". He has appeared as a celebrity player on both Merv Griffin game shows Jeopardy! and Wheel of Fortune.

Roker has hosted programs on Food Network, namely, Roker on the Road, and Tricked-Out Tailgating. He is also an avid barbecue enthusiast.

Roker provided forecasts for several radio stations, including the New York smooth jazz radio station WQCD (101.9 FM) and for Cleveland smooth jazz station WNWV (107.3 FM), through a service called the "Al Roker Radio Weather Network", distributed by United Stations Radio Networks. It has since been replaced by Accuweather. He also had a one and a half hour weekday morning stint live from 5:00–7:00 a.m. on The Weather Channel under the name Wake Up with Al which aired from 2009 until 2015.

Roker created the animated PBS Kids program, Weather Hunters, which premiered in September 2025. Roker is the voice actor for Al Hunter, the father of protagonist, Lily Hunter. The series explores the elementary science around weather phenomena and is targeted at children ages 5–8.

=== Theatre ===
On May 22, 2003, Roker made a cameo in The Play What I Wrote on Broadway as the Mystery Guest Star.

It was announced on September 5, 2018, that Roker would make his Broadway debut portraying Joe in the musical Waitress for a six-week run from October 5 to November 11. He later returned to the show for a limited run from November 1 to 24, 2019.

On December 19, 2023, he returned to Broadway for a one night only cameo in Gutenberg! The Musical! as the Producer. On 28 March 2024, Roker was in Back to the Future: The Musical on Broadway as Strickland.

=== Author ===
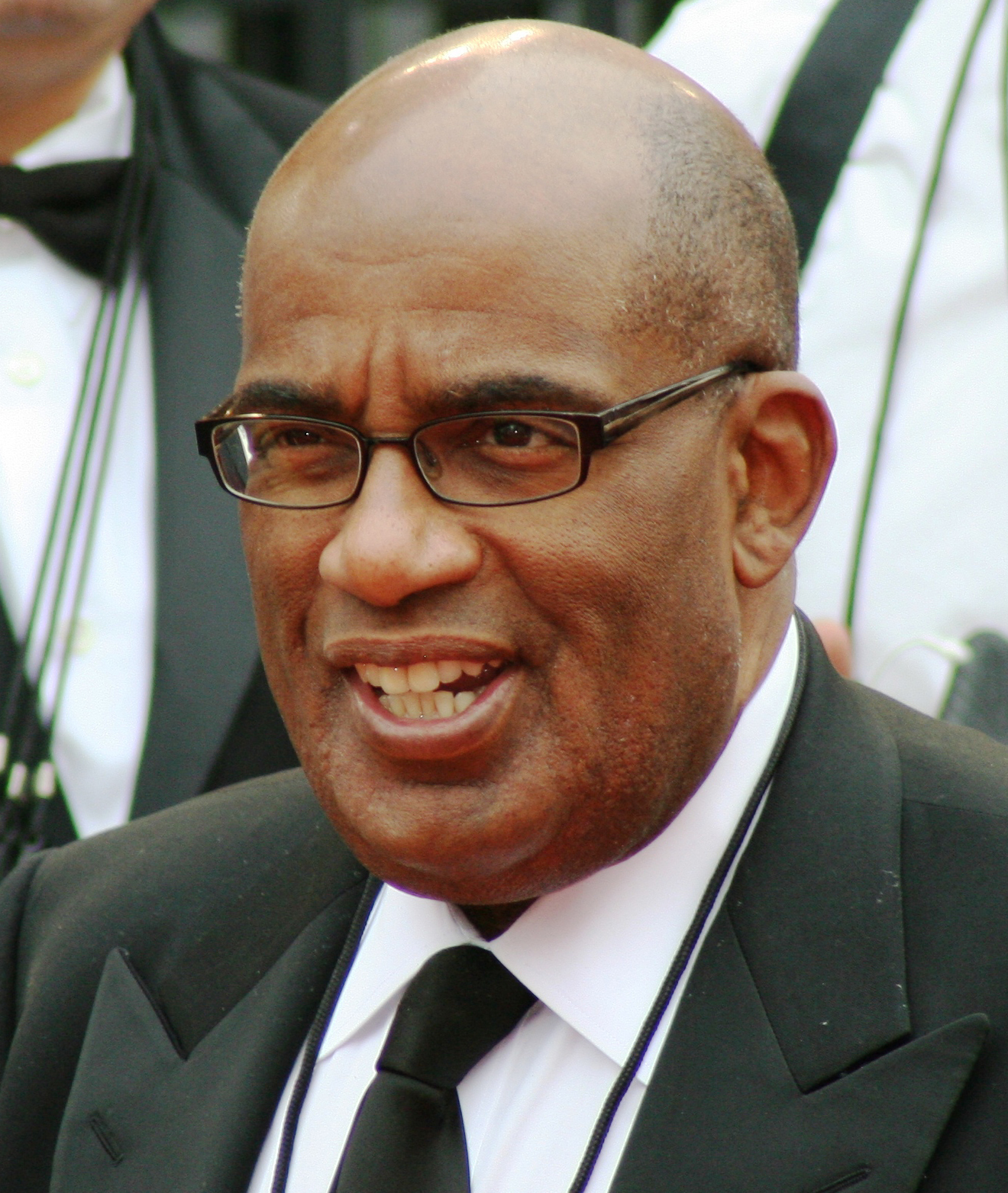
Roker at the 81st Academy Awards in February 2009

Writing with Dick Lochte, Roker co-authored a series of murder mysteries beginning in 2009 that feature Billy Blessing, a celebrity chef turned amateur detective. The second book in the series, The Midnight Show Murders (2010), was nominated for a 2011 Nero Award. The Morning Show Murders, also published in 2010, was made into the 2018 movie on Hallmark Movies and Mysteries with Holly Robinson Peete in the lead role.

In 2016, the non-fiction book Been There, Done That: Family Wisdom for Modern Times, written by Roker and his wife Deborah Roberts, was published.

== Personal life ==
Roker married his first wife, Mary Puglisi, who was his college girlfriend, the day they graduated from SUNY Oswego in 1976. While living in Cleveland several years later, the couple spoke openly about their experiences being in an interracial marriage. Following their divorce, Roker married WNBC producer Alice Bell in December 1984. He and Bell adopted a daughter, Courtney, as an infant in 1987. Roker and Bell later divorced. Roker married TV journalist Deborah Roberts on September 16, 1995. They are the parents of daughter Leila (b. November 17, 1998) and son Nicholas (b. July 18, 2002). The couple live in a townhouse on Manhattan's Upper East Side and also own a house in the foothills of the Berkshires. Roker is an Episcopalian and attends St. James Episcopal Church in Manhattan.

In November 2010, Roker ran in the New York City Marathon.

Roker is an honorary member of the Phi Beta Sigma fraternity.

In May 2021, Roker returned to his former stomping grounds in Cleveland to report on the city's reopening efforts following the COVID-19 pandemic, and while live on the Today Show, WKYC chief meteorologist Betsy Kling announced that the station had named the radar tower on top of the WKYC building the "Roker Tower" in his honor, and presented Roker a plaque to commemorate the occasion.

=== Health ===
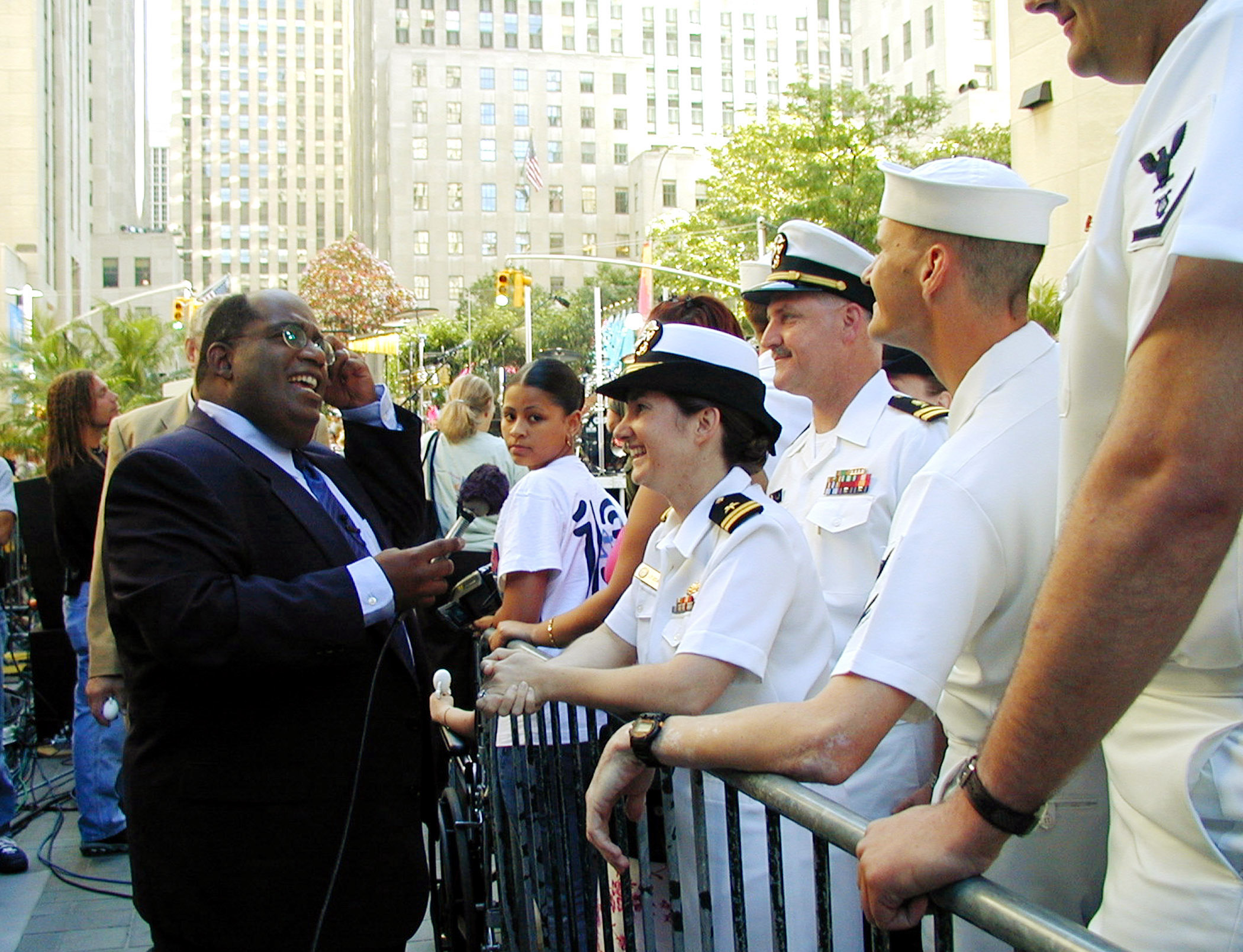
Roker with members of the United States Navy, 2000

In June 2001, Roker underwent a total knee arthoplasty (replacement, or "TKA") on his left knee.

In 2002, Roker underwent gastric bypass surgery to lose weight, which he said he did after failing at numerous diets. Eight months after the surgery, the New York Daily News reported he had dropped 100 pounds (45 kg) from his 320 lb (150 kg) figure. Roker wrote about his battle with weight loss in Never Goin' Back: Winning the Weight Loss Battle For Good, published in 2013. In a Dateline NBC interview promoting the book, he disclosed that he experienced fecal incontinence while attempting to relieve flatulence in private during a visit to the White House one month after his surgery. He attributed the incident to his failure to follow dietary guidelines given by his physicians, stating that similar incidents were common among gastric bypass patients. He recalled that during a moment of panic, he disposed of his underwear in the restroom of the press room and "went commando" for the remainder of the work day. He said: "I put that in the book because I wanted people to realize that there are consequences to gastric bypass surgery or any kind of gastric surgery, some of them embarrassing; others can be life-threatening or fatal."

In 2005, he had a back operation. He had another knee replacement surgery in 2016.

In October 2018, Roker underwent emergency carpal tunnel surgery.

In September 2019, he had a hip replacement surgery, for which he was absent from Today for two weeks.

In November 2020, he revealed he was diagnosed with prostate cancer in September 2020. He had a successful operation on November 9, and by November 17 he was at home recovering.

In November 2022, after being absent from Today for a few days, Roker revealed he was in the hospital being treated for blood clots in his lungs. He returned to the show on January 6, 2023, revealing he also suffered from internal bleeding which necessitated surgery, two bleeding ulcers, colon resection surgery when part or all of the colon is removed (colectomy), and gallbladder removal surgery (cholecystectomy). Roker credits his wife and NewYork-Presbyterian physicians and staff for saving his life.

=== Charity work ===
In 2007, Roker became an official supporter of Ronald McDonald House Charities and is a member of their celebrity board, called the Friends of RMHC. He also was the official spokesperson for Amtrak's National Train Day, which took place on May 10, 2008.

== Signature phrases ==
- Roker often says "That's what's going on around the country, here's what's happening in your neck of the woods" when transitioning from the national weather broadcast to the local affiliate.
- On many occasions on Today, he has used the phrase "man candy" to describe attractive males.
- When he mentions Sunday's weather forecast on weekdays, often he repeats the word "Sunday", imitating the drag racing promotional catchphrase.
- During Macy's Thanksgiving Day Parade ribbon cutting ceremonies, he is joined by the producers of the parade or the CEO of Macy's and special guests in kicking off the parade with the countdown "5, 4, 3, 2, 1. Let's have a parade!"

== Other appearances and activities ==
- In 1993, Roker appeared as himself in an episode of Seinfeld entitled “The Cigar Store Indian.” He was featured on the cover of a TV Guide that was a central focus of Elaine's storyline for the episode, and at the end of the episode joins her on the subway while replicating the pose on the magazine cover.
- On the May 9, 1998, episode of Saturday Night Live (hosted by David Duchovny), Roker appeared in a "Mango" sketch with Matt Lauer. The typical Mango sketch involved a person becoming obsessed with Mango, a character portrayed by cast member Chris Kattan.
- Roker voiced a caricature of himself as a faustian figure in two episodes of the animated Disney Channel series The Proud Family, a role he reprised in the Disney+ revival, The Proud Family: Louder and Prouder.
- During the first inaugural parade of President Barack Obama, Al Roker obtained the "first interview" with the new president by waving his fedora hat and yelling to the walking Obama to come over. Acknowledging Roker, the perambulating president continued on, telling him "it's warm!"
- Roker holds the record for most appearances on Late Night with Conan O'Brien, with over 30. He would often appear on the show as a last-minute replacement if a previously scheduled guest canceled their appearance.
- Roker makes a cameo appearance as the honorary Orange Wiggle in The Wiggles song, "Thank You, Mr. Weatherman" on their 2011 release "Ukulele, Baby!"
- Roker had a cameo appearance in Sharknado 2: The Second One, which premiered on Syfy on July 30, 2014.
  - He reprised the cameo in the sequels Sharknado 3: Oh Hell No!, which premiered on July 22, 2015, Sharknado: The 4th Awakens, which premiered on July 31, 2016, Sharknado 5: Global Swarming in 2017, and The Last Sharknado: It's About Time in 2018.
- Roker appeared as the guest ring announcer at WrestleMania 33, for the match between John Cena and Nikki Bella, versus The Miz and Maryse.
- In 2014, Commandant of the Coast Guard Admiral Robert Papp named Roker an honorary commodore in the United States Coast Guard Auxiliary. Roker had produced and narrated a Coast Guard documentary television series.
- In 2018, Roker appeared in episode 400 of My Brother, My Brother, and Me
- In 2018, Roker appeared in the Hallmark television movie Morning Show Mysteries: Mortal Mishaps based on the book series he co-authored.
- In 2019, Roker appeared in the Hallmark television movie Morning Show Mysteries: Death by Design based on the book series he co-authored.
- In 2022, Roker would make a cameo in a season 47 Please Don't Destroy sketch on SNL alongside actor Paul Rudd and writers Martin Herlihy, John Higgins and Ben Marshall.

== Filmography ==
Year	Title	Role	Notes
1990	Another World	Himself	Television series; one episode
1993	Seinfeld	Himself	Episode: "The Cigar Store Indian"
1994	Reading Rainbow	Himself	Episode: "Hail to Mail"
1994	Mad About You	Himself	Episode: "Pandora's Box"
1994	Where in the World Is Carmen Sandiego?	Himself	Episode: "Tales You Lose"
1996	NewsRadio	Guy	Episode: "President"
1997	The Single Guy	Dr. Benjamin	Television series; one episode
1997	Men in Black	Alien on TV monitor	Uncredited
1998	Superman: The Animated Series	Weather presenter (voice)	Episode: "Little Girl Lost"
1998	Quest for Camelot	Knight (voice)	
1998, 2007, 2022	Saturday Night Live	Himself	Television series; three episodes
1999	Space Ghost Coast to Coast	Himself	Episode: "Chambraigne"
2000	Will & Grace	Himself	Episode: "Acting Out"
2001	Sesame Street	Himself	Episode: "Hurricane, Part 1"
2003	Freedom: A History of Us	Christian reorder editor Henry McNeal Turner	Television miniseries
2003	Wholey Moses	Weather presenter (voice)	Short film
2003	Cyberchase	Sam Vander Rom (voice)	Television series; three episodes
2003–2004	The Proud Family	Faustian Al Roker (voice)	Television series; two episodes
2005	Robots	Mailbox (voice)	
2005	Madagascar	Newscaster #3 (voice)	
2006	Unaccompanied Minors	Himself	
2007, 2012	30 Rock	Himself	Television series; two episodes
2008	Madagascar: Escape 2 Africa	Newscaster (voice)	
2009	Cloudy with a Chance of Meatballs	Patrick Patrickson (voice)	
2011	The Wiggles' Big Birthday!	Himself	Australian release only
2011	The Wiggles: Ukulele Baby!	Himself	American and UK releases only
2011	WordGirl	Sonny Days (voice)	Episode: "Sonny Days with a Chance of Showers"
2011	The Big Year	New York Weather presenter	
2012	The Pirates! Band of Misfits!	The Pirate Who Likes Sunsets and Kittens (voice)	United States release only
2012	Treme	Himself	Episode: "Promised Land"
2012	The Simpsons	Himself (voice)	Episode: “Moonshine River”
2012–2013	The Penguins of Madagascar	Gil Force (voice)	
2013	The Michael J. Fox Show	Himself	Episode: "Pilot"
2013	Cloudy with a Chance of Meatballs 2	Patrick Patrickson (voice)	
2014	Sharknado 2: The Second One	Himself	Television film
2015	Saturday Night Live 40th Anniversary Special	Himself	Television special
2015	Sharknado 3: Oh Hell No!	Himself	Television film
2016	Kung Fu Panda 3	Dim (voice)	
2016	Ghostbusters	Himself	Cameo
2016	Sharknado: The 4th Awakens	Himself	Television film
2017	WWE WrestleMania 33	Himself	Pay-Per View, Guest Ring Announcer
2017	Sharknado 5: Global Swarming	Himself	Television film
2018	The Last Sharknado: It's About Time	Himself	Television film
2018–2019	Morning Show Mysteries	Himself	2 episodes; Also executive producer 6 episodes
2019	Zombieland: Double Tap	Himself	
2020	The Blacklist	Himself	Episode: "Roy Cain"
2021	Who Are You, Charlie Brown?	Himself	Documentary special
2021	Martha Gets Down and Dirty	Himself	Episode: "Fire Up the Wieners"
2021	Mooseltoe	Gus (narrator)	Children's streaming musical
2022	The Proud Family: Louder and Prouder	Faustian Al Roker	Episode: "When You Wish Upon a Roker"
2023	Good Burger 2	Himself	Cameo
2025–present	Weather Hunters	Al Hunter (voice)	Television series

== Works ==
- 2000: Don't Make Me Stop This Car!: Adventures in Fatherhood Scribner. ISBN 9780684868936
- 2013: Never Goin' Back: Winning the Weight-Loss Battle For Good NAL. ISBN 978-0-451-41493-9
- 2016: Been There, Done That: Family Wisdom for Modern Times co-written with his wife Deborah Roberts. Berkley. ISBN 978-0-451-46636-5
- 2020: You Look So Much Better in Person: True Stories of Absurdity and Success. Hachette Book Group. ISBN 978-0-316-42679-4

Billy Blessing novels

- 2009: The Morning Show Murders. Co-authored by Dick Lochte. ISBN 0-385-34368-X.
- 2010: The Midnight Show Murders. Co-authored by Dick Lochte; nominated for the 2011 Nero Award. ISBN 0-385-34369-8.
- 2011: The Talk Show Murders. Co-authored by Dick Lochte. ISBN 0-385-34370-1.

== See also ==
- Bahamian Americans
- New Yorkers in journalism
