= Been There, Done That (book) =

Been There, Done That: Family Wisdom for Modern Times
- Authors: Al Roker; Deborah Roberts; Laura Morton
- Language: English
- Published: 2016
- Publisher: New American Library
- Publication place: United States
- ISBN: 978-0-451-46636-5

Been There, Done That: Family Wisdom for Modern Times is a 2016 non-fiction book written by real life husband and wife Al Roker and Deborah Roberts.

== Overview ==
An insight into the marriage of media personalities Al Roker and Deborah Roberts.
