= Bill Sharkey (footballer) =

Australian rules footballer

Personal information
- Full name: William Thomas Sharkey
- Born: 20 September 1873; North Melbourne, Victoria
- Died: 15 May 1946 (aged 72); Fitzroy, Victoria
- Original team: Carlton Juniors

Playing career^{1}
Years	Club	Games (Goals)
1898–1901	Carlton	47 (0)
- ^{1} Playing statistics correct to the end of 1901.

William Thomas Sharkey (20 September 1873 – 15 May 1946) was an Australian rules footballer who played with Carlton in the Victorian Football League (VFL).
