= Kevin Sharkey (journalist) =

Irish broadcast journalist

Kevin Sharkey (born 1964 in County Donegal) is a broadcast journalist with BBC Northern Ireland.

== Career ==
Raised in Annagry in The Rosses, Sharkey began his full-time career in journalism in 1990 when he became part of a new wave of local radio stations being set up across Ireland, joining the Highland Radio Newsroom in Letterkenny, County Donegal. It was there, in 1994, that he secured one of the big journalistic scoops of that political era when he became the first Irish broadcaster to interview senior Sinn Féin leadership figures following the abolition of what was known as the 'Section 31' broadcasting ban.

In 2002, he moved to BBC News in Northern Ireland. He has worked as a TV and radio reporter in general news, current affairs and politics.

This has included reporting on The Politics Show and, currently, on BBC Newsline. This includes many news stories linked to the legacy of the conflict in Northern Ireland as well as court cases annual commemorations and cultural issues.

He is also the dedicated BBC NI News reporter covering the Historical Institutional Abuse Inquiry.

His has worked across BBC Radio Ulster current affairs programmes including Good Morning Ulster, Talkback and Evening Extra.

This has included reporting across a range of high-profile and significant political events including the end of 'Operation Banner'.

He has also covered international events including the renowned Smithsonian Festival in Washington DC and the 60th anniversary of a unique world record involving Irish emigrants to Scotland.

He has reported from significant state visits to Ireland including the Royal Visit in 2015.

His reporting from contentious events on the streets of Northern Ireland has helped to inform academic discourse about online journalism.

In 2007 and again in 2010, he was awarded the Radio News/Current Affairs Journalist of the Year.
