= Kevin Sharkey (executive) =

American business executive

Kevin Sharkey is the senior vice president and executive editorial director of Martha Stewart Living Omnimedia.

In 2018, Sharkey and Martha Stewart published the book Martha's Flowers.
