= Emergency Alerts (United Kingdom) =

Emergency population warning system used in the United Kingdom

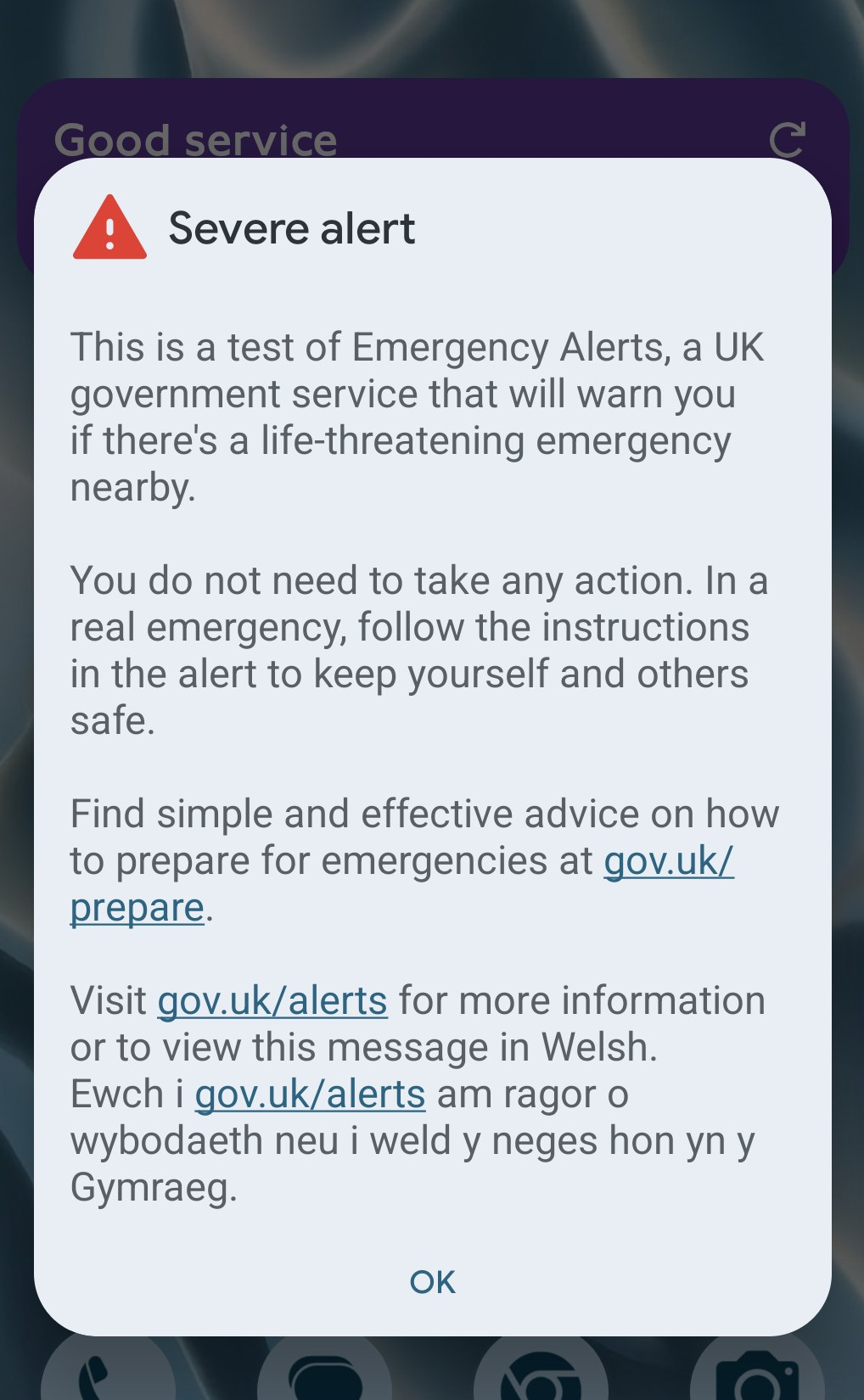
Screenshot of an Android 16 UI showing the UK Emergency Alert test on 7 September 2025.

The United Kingdom's mobile phone alert system is a public population warning system that uses cell broadcast technology.

The warning system is intended for use in major incidents such as flooding or terror attacks. The Emergency Alert System was launched on 19 March 2023, and tested on a nationwide basis for the first time on 23 April 2023. On 23 February 2024, the system's first non-test alert was sent to residents of Plymouth ordering partial evacuation after the discovery of a live WW2-era German munition in a back garden.

== History ==
During the Cold War, the UK developed an emergency alert system called Handel, operated by the UK Warning and Monitoring Organisation, aimed to alert British institutions and the public before a catastrophic wartime attack such as a nuclear warhead detonation or severe bombing. The Wartime Broadcasting Service was to disseminate the "four-minute warning" of such an attack and then work to keep the population informed during the aftermath. The system was discontinued in 1992.

=== Early cell broadcast trials ===
In 2013, the Government of the United Kingdom trialled a system similar to other countries in which cell broadcasts would be simultaneously broadcast to multiple mobile devices. The final project report in 2014 found that "Responders remain very keen to see the implementation of a national mobile alert system" and that "the majority of people (85%) felt that a mobile alert system was a good idea." The report said it was the hope to carry out more trials, however past that point no further trials were conducted. An earlier 2012 report ("Extended Floodline Warnings Direct Trial") by the Cabinet Office using mobile phone calls found that only 12% of recipients acknowledged the alert. During the COVID-19 pandemic in the United Kingdom, the government was accused of ignoring its own advice to set up UK emergency alert system and how after seven years of the Cabinet Office's own report showing such systems were successful, there was "no sign of a system being developed."

In 2019 and early 2020, the Environment Agency collaborated with EE, Fujitsu and the University of Hull to trial Cell Broadcasting technologies for the purpose of flood warning.

=== Coronavirus (COVID-19) pandemic ===
On 24 March 2020, the government collaborated with all UK mobile networks to send a text message to inform people of the new lockdown rules.

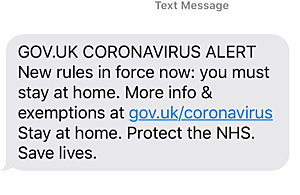
Text message sent to all UK mobile numbers when the first UK lockdown began.

On 26 December 2021, the government sent another nationwide text message to inform the population about the availability of COVID-19 booster vaccinations, available for free through the NHS.

=== Cell broadcast trial and implementation ===
In 2020, the UK began developing an emergency alert system using Cell Broadcast in collaboration with UK mobile networks.

In March 2021, a test across all networks on the test channels took place in Reading with the British government's Flood Information Service updating a page on its website, stating that the new cell broadcast system is being tested, and some devices may receive test alerts. This page was updated again in April for further operator tests.

A test broadcast was made for customers on O2 on 11 May 2021 at around 8 am to users who had enabled test alerts in their phone's Wireless Alerts settings. A similar trial was run on 20 May for EE customers. Two alerts were sent, received at around 13:21 and 13:48 respectively.

The first test on the public channels for the new Emergency Alerts System was on 25 May in East Suffolk, the second test of the system was on 29 June in Reading, before being rolled out with an introduction Emergency Alert nationwide in October 2022. The system is guaranteed to work on iOS 14.5 and later, and on Android 11 and later, though if Wireless Alerts settings are available on older Android devices, the alerts are very likely to work on those, too. Since the majority of Android devices are already compatible with Cell Broadcast alerts such as the USA's WEA system, most older Android devices should also be compatible.

The alerts will only be available on devices that connect to the UK's 4G and 5G networks, but not 2G or 3G despite Cell Broadcast being part of the GSM specification; the Government's rationale being that the 2G/3G networks will be shut down within 5 years. The loud sound that is played on receiving an alert is exactly the same sound that is used on all comparable emergency alert systems, such as Wireless Emergency Alerts in the US and EU-Alert variants in Europe. Users can opt out of lower level alerts, but the highest level of alerts will still sound.

== UK Emergency Alert System ==
The alert system is intended to allow government and the emergency services to send a text alert to mobile phones in a situation where there is perceived to be an immediate risk to life. Mobile users will receive an alert accompanied by a siren-like noise, similar to ones used in the EAS, they must acknowledge in order to use the phone's other features. In an emergency, the alert will inform people where the emergency is, and tell them what they need to do in response, though people are able to opt out.

The alert system will be used to warn the public in the event of incidents such as fires, flooding, extreme weather conditions and terrorist attacks.

The Emergency Alert System was nationally launched on 19 March 2023, almost two years after the first public test. The UK government has estimated the Emergency Alert system will cost £25.3m in its first three years of operation.

== Local and national tests ==
Local tests were carried out in East Suffolk and Reading in 2021.

On the day of its launch, the UK Government confirmed plans to conduct a national test of the system at 3:00 pm on 23 April 2023. About 90% of phones in the UK were expected to receive the test alert.

Prior to the test alert, domestic abuse charities in the UK, including Refuge, expressed their concern that victims of domestic abuse who kept a concealed phone as a safety precaution could be placed at risk by the sounding of the alert. This prompted the UK government to issue advice to people in that particular situation to switch the device off, as the alert would not sound if the phone is switched off. It would also not sound if aeroplane mode was switched on. Refuge also produced a video showing how the alerts could be switched off in a phone's settings.

Sport and entertainment venues confirmed plans to minimise disruption. Sheffield's Crucible Theatre announced that the 2023 World Snooker Championship would be briefly paused to accommodate the test, while the Society of London Theatre said it had advised its members to ask theatregoers to turn off their mobile phones during matinee performances. No theatres planned to alter the time of their performances, although it was reported some planned to briefly pause performances for the test alert. Organisers of the 2023 London Marathon, which was due to take place on the same day as the test, issued a statement in advance advising participants and spectators. Speaking on the morning of 23 April, Oliver Dowden, the Deputy Prime Minister, said that people would not need to take any action because of the test alert, while the consumer organisation Which? issued a statement ahead of the alert to warn people of potential scams: "Events like this can be a magnet for scammers looking to take advantage of the confusion. Anything that asks you to take action from the alert is a scam."

The test alert was sent to mobile phones on the 5G and 4G networks. During the test alert, the siren sounded for around ten seconds, even on phones set to silent mode. The test alert read:

This is a test of Emergency Alerts, a new UK government service that will warn you if there's a life-threatening emergency nearby. In a real emergency, follow the instructions in the alert to keep yourself and others safe. Visit gov.uk/alerts for more information. This is a test. You do not need to take any action.

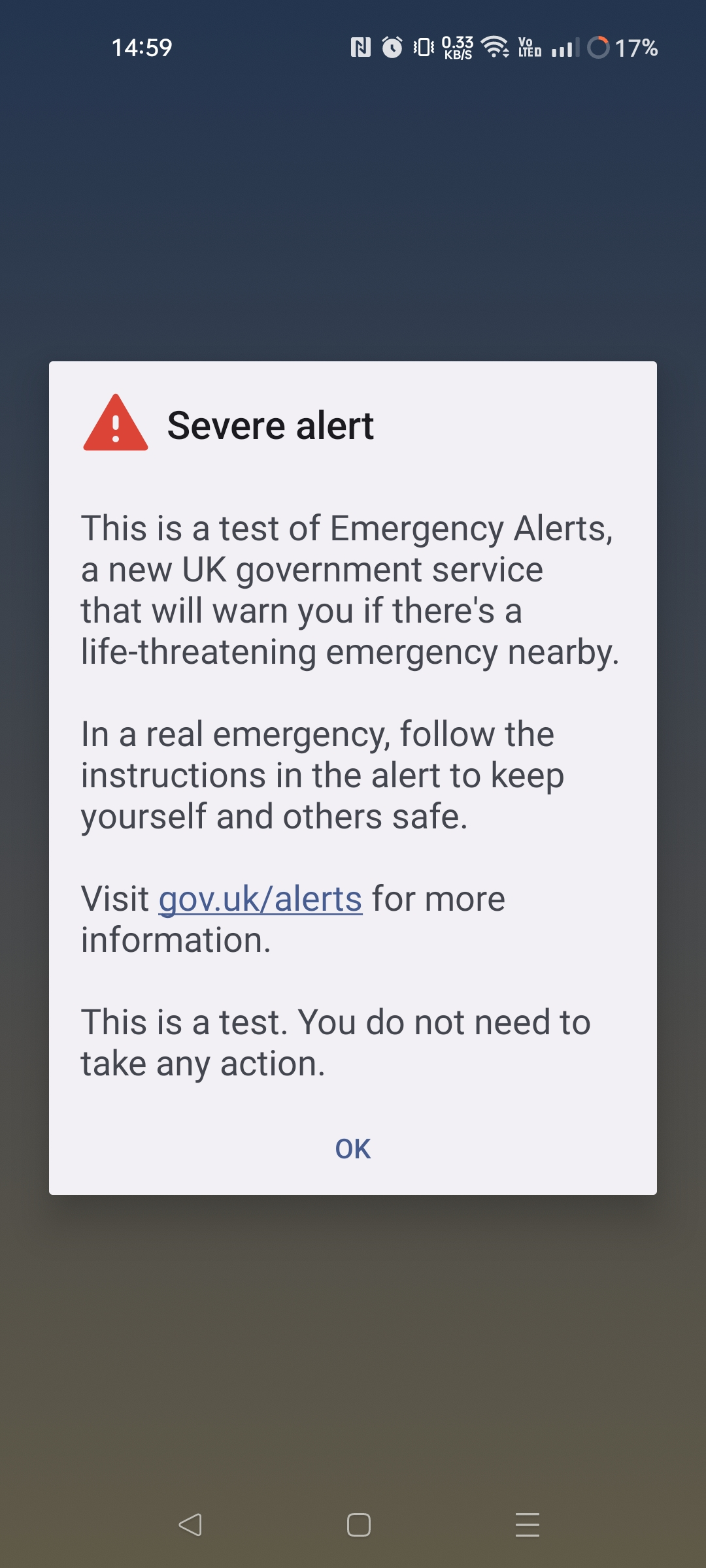
Screenshot of the alert message as it appeared on an Android phone at 14:59 on 23 April 2023

The alert needed to be accepted by the recipient in order for them to continue using their device.

Following the test, some mobile phone users took to social media to complain that the alert had sounded either one minute earlier or one minute later than scheduled, while some reported receiving a message titled with the words "severe alert". Many users of the Three mobile network did not receive the test alert, but some on the O2 and Vodafone networks also reported difficulty. Three said it was aware some of its mobile users had not received the alert: "We are working closely with the government to understand why and ensure it doesn't happen when the system is in use." The Cabinet Office said it would review the outcome of the test and that it was aware a "very small proportion of mobile users on some networks did not receive it". Deputy Prime Minister Oliver Dowden subsequently told Parliament he had initiated the alert at 14:59 BST in order to minimise potential disruption to events starting at 3pm, and that it had remained active until 15:21 BST.

The Welsh alert message included a typo in which the Welsh word for safe – ddiogel – was misspelt as Vogel; the letter 'v' does not appear in Welsh orthography. Deputy Prime Minister Oliver Dowden told the House of Commons that autocorrect had been to blame for the error, but that the "essence of the message remained unchanged".

The Cabinet Office confirmed that 80% of mobile phones were capable of receiving the alert message, but that 7% had not received it, either because of the issue with the Three network, or because people had either disabled emergency alerts or switched to aeroplane mode. The Cabinet Office also said the test had been successful, and that there would likely be further tests to the alert system in future, but that there were "no current plans" to test it again. Some mobile users received a second, unannounced "mobile network operator test" alert just after 2 pm on 2 May 2023.

On 18 July 2023, Roger Hargreaves, director of Cobra, suggested to the Public Administration and Constitutional Affairs Committee that the emergency alert system should be tested every two years to ensure the technology is working.

On Tuesday 3 September 2024, at roughly 2:10 pm GMT another test was broadcast in Sunderland.

A second national test of the system occurred on 7 September 2025 at 3:00 pm. The advice issued in 2023 for victims of domestic abuse who keep a concealed phone was reissued.

== Operational use ==
The first live use of the system was on 23 February 2024, upon discovery of an undetonated Second World War air dropped 500 kilograms (1,100 lb) SC 500 bomb in a back garden in Keyham. Residents in Plymouth, Devon were advised to evacuate part of the city. Residents were sent an alert at noon, two hours before the device was moved by military convoy for disposal at sea. A second group of residents were thus alerted to leave homes within 300 metres (980 ft) of its journey to Torpoint Ferry slipway.

On 6 December 2024 at 19:00 hours as Storm Darragh approached the UK, the system was used to alert around three million people living in Wales and South West England of a potential danger to life.

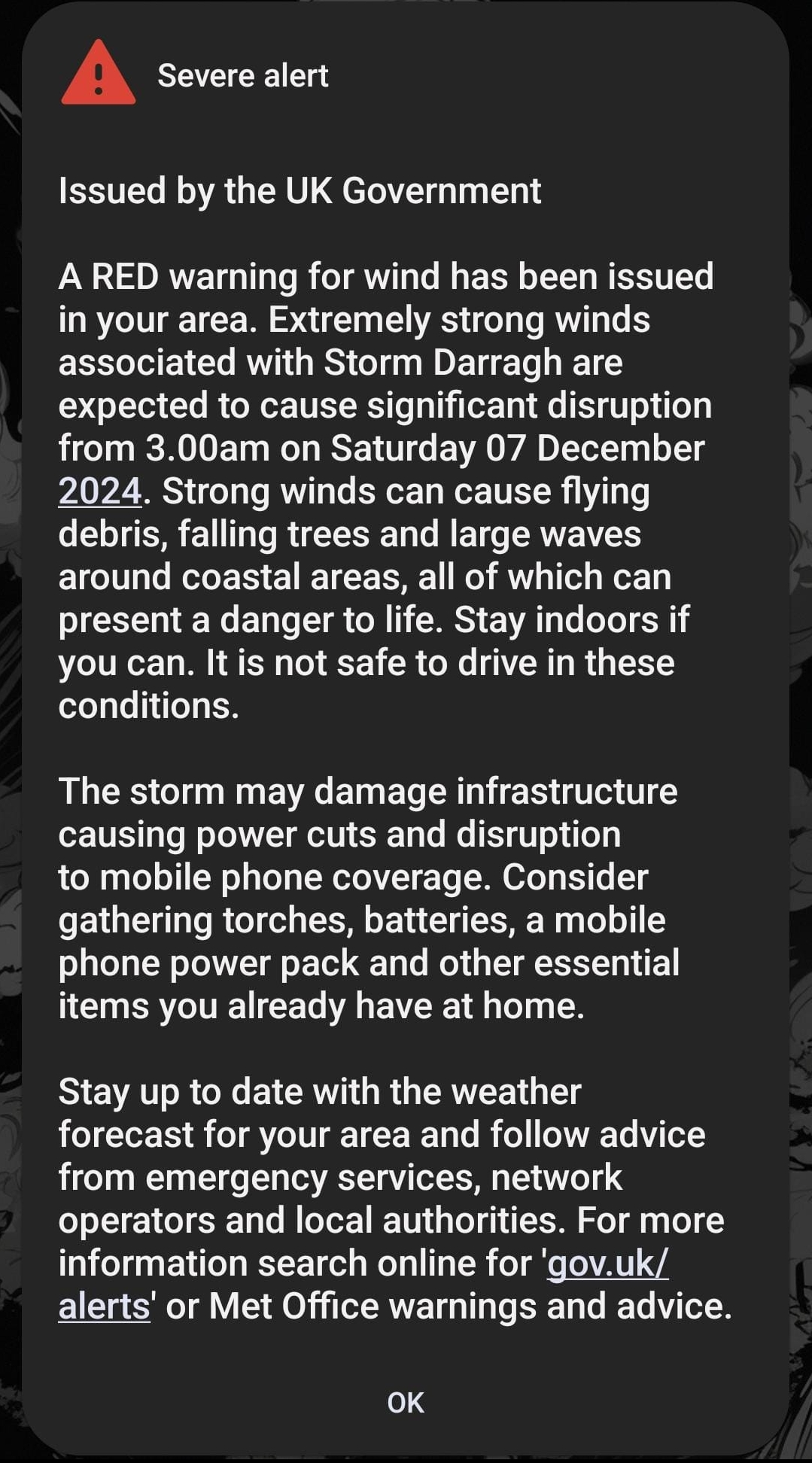
Screenshot of the UK alert message as it appeared on an Android phone on 6 December 2024

On 23 January 2025 relating to Storm Éowyn, an alert was sent out to all of Northern Ireland and the central belt of Scotland at 5:25 pm GMT and 5:50 pm GMT respectively regarding the red warnings issued by the Met Office. This alert was sent to an estimated 4.5 million people, becoming the largest use of the system up until that point.

On 8 January 2026 due to strong winds caused by Storm Goretti, an alert was sent out. A red weather warning was issued in the Isles of Scilly and Cornwall, at 15:03 hours and 17:00 hours respectively.

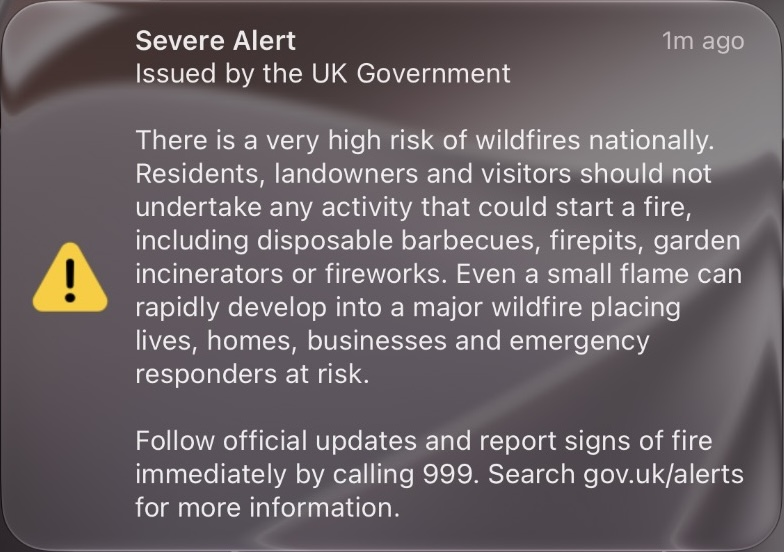
Screenshot of the UK alert message sent to users in England and Wales, as it appeared on an iPhone on 14 August 2026

On 14 August 2026, at 7pm, the system was used to alert people in England and Wales advising of high risk wildfires as a result of extreme heat. The warning included a temporary ban on portable barbecues. In parts of Wales these messages were sent in Welsh only, with translations also initially missing from Gov.uk as both Welsh and English pages were carrying text in Welsh. This activation is, to date, the largest use of the system in response to an active incident. It was also the first time it was used to alert of wildfires.

== Reception ==
The wildfire warning on the 14 August 2026 received mixed responses from citizens. Some members of the public issued criticism, particularly over the volume of the accompanying siren, the initial use of a Welsh language-only message for people in Wales, and concerns over whether the circumstances warranted use of the system. Others, including the government, defended the activation, saying that it had been requested by fire and rescue services and was intended to prevent further fires and protect lives and property during exceptionally dangerous conditions.

== See also ==
- EU-Alert, an equivalent cell broadcast system
- Handel UK Cold War system
- Four-minute warning, UK, during Cold War
- Reverse 1-1-2
- Cell Broadcast
- Early warning system
- Emergency communication system
- Emergency population warning broadcasting
