= NL-Alert =

Emergency population warning system used in Nederlands

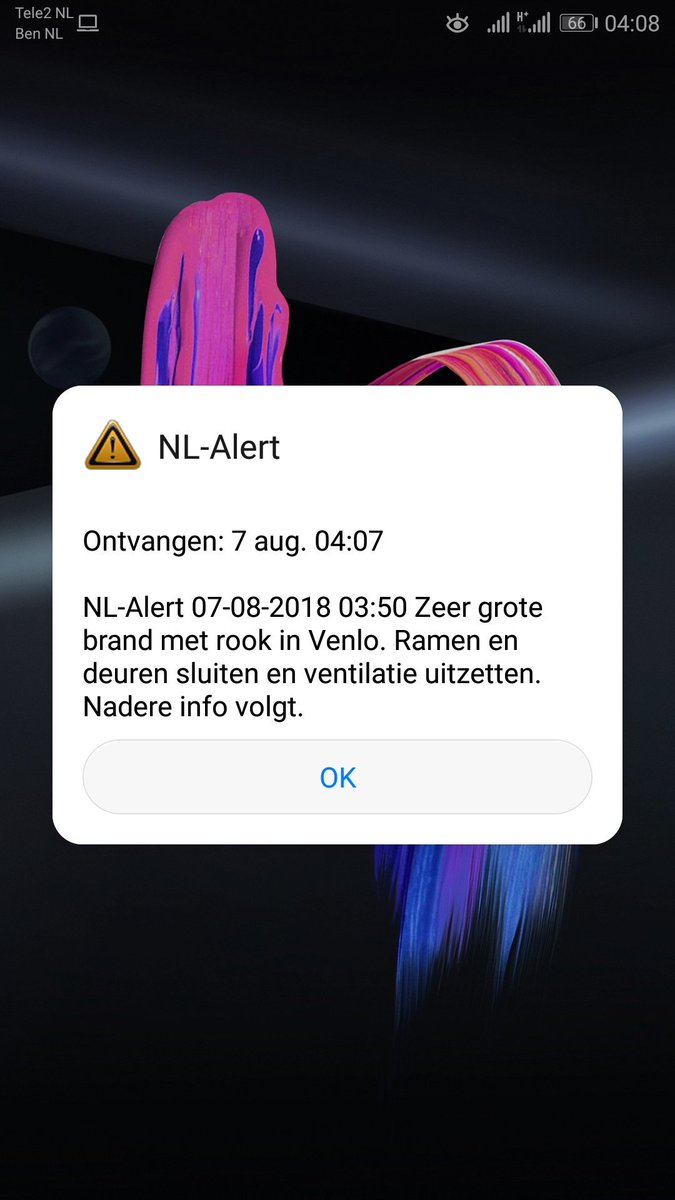
NL-Alert broadcast in the area of Venlo on 7 August 2018 because of a large toxic fire.

NL-Alert is a cell broadcast alarm system in use by the Dutch government to quickly alert and inform citizens of hazardous or crisis situations. Using this system, authorities can send messages to users of mobile phones in specific areas by using specific cell towers to alert phones within their reach. NL-Alert is one of the first implementations of the EU-Alert or Reverse 1-1-2 legislation as defined by the binding European Electronic Communications Code (EECC) using the Cell Broadcast technology for the delivery of public warning messages to the general public.

== Usage of the service ==
The system was introduced nationally on 8 November 2012, and was first used in a large fire in Tolbert on 14 December 2012. The second use was in another fire in Meppel in 2013. NL-Alert has been used more than 200 times as of December 2017 for public warning purposes (for example, large forest and industrial fires, severe weather conditions and gas leakages).

== Background ==
NL-Alert is an addition to the existing emergency population warning system, which works using a large amount of sirens on masts throughout the country. A key difference between these systems is that users of NL-Alert are not only warned, but also immediately informed about the situation. NL-Alert messages include the location of an incident and advice on bringing oneself to safety. NL-Alert messages have a distinct alarm sound – which stops when the message is seen by the user.

Receiving NL-Alert is free. A user does not have to register to receive alerts, but may need to configure a device to receive cell broadcasts. Increasingly, mobile phones are pre-configured by their manufacturers to receive cell broadcasts, including NL-Alert, via 2G, 3G and 4G systems.

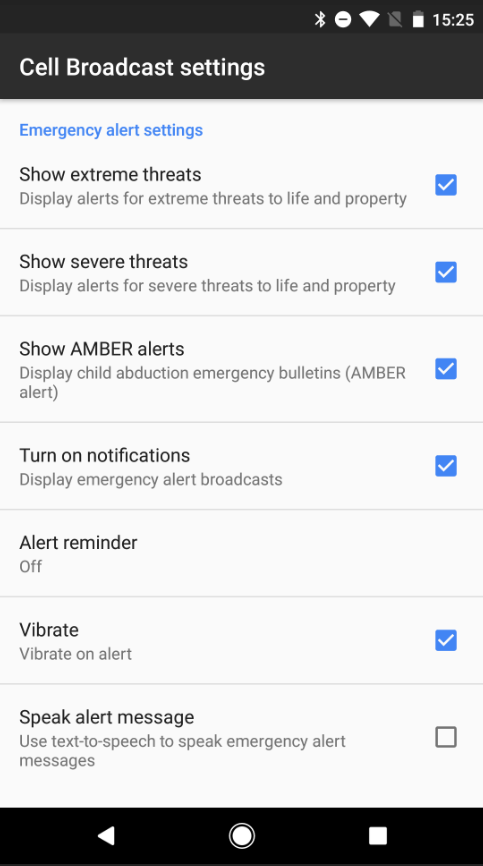
NL-Alert Cell Broadcast configuration menu on Android 7.1

== Adoption rate ==
NL-Alert has been used in the Netherlands for several years, and every six months a test message is sent which is broadcast throughout the Netherlands, which happens at 12:00 PM on the first monday of both June and December. The reach of the Control Cell Broadcast message has increased over the years resulting that in June 2020 more than 13.6 million (90%) citizens of 12 years and older received directly the test warning Cell Broadcast message on their mobile phone. There is great willingness to pass on an NL-Alert message to others, from the 10% of people who did not receive the message (e.g. because they do not have a mobile phone), 4% heard it through other people and reaching with this single Cell Broadcast message in total 14.2 million people – 94% of the Dutch population of 12 years and older.

- 7 December 2015 – 7.1 million people of 12 years and older (49%) (full nationwide LTE coverage)
- 6 June 2016 – 8.3 million people of 12 years and older (57%)
- 5 December 2016 – 8.8 million people of 12 years and older (60%)
- 3 July 2017 – 9.2 million people of 12 years and older (63%)
- 4 December 2017 – 10.8 million people of 12 years and older (74%)
- 4 June 2018 – 11.3 million people of 12 years and older (76%)
- 3 December 2018 – 12.43 million people of 12 years and older (83%)
- 3 June 2019 – 13.18 million people of 12 years and older (88%)
- 2 December 2019 – 13.7 million people of 12 years and older (90.7%)
- 8 June 2020 – 14.2 million people of 12 years and older (94% of the population).

== Multi Channel Approach ==
NL-Alert uses Cell Broadcast as the primary channel to issue warnings and alerts.

As no channel will suit every situation or every person, multiple channels are used by NL-Alert to make sure as many people as possible receive the information they need. This includes, since December 2018, digital information screens at public transportation stops. Additional dissemination channels are expected to be added in the coming period. Alerts and warnings are sent to the new channel both nationally and locally depending on the emergency.

- 3 December 2018 – 300.000 people aged 12 and over saw the NL-Alert on the digital information screens.
- 2 December 2019 – 300.000 people aged 12 and over saw the NL-Alert on the digital information screens and 150.000 on digital advertising screens.

== See also ==
- Cell Broadcast
- Early warning system
- Emergency communication system
- Emergency population warning broadcasting
- EU-Alert (European Union)
- Reverse 1-1-2
