= EU-Alert =

Emergency population warning system used within Europe

Status of Implementation of EU-Alert system in November 2026. Cell Broadcast in use Cell Broadcast in implementation LB-SMS being upgraded to Cell broadcast Location-Based SMS (LB-SMS)

EU-Alert is a public warning system designed to disseminate emergency alerts to mobile phones based on cell broadcast technology, as defined by ETSI standards. National authorities are able to disseminate emergency alerts and warning messages through the system. EU-Alert is a standard designed for interoperability and national implementation may vary. The standards are based on NL-Alert from the Netherlands, which first became operational in 2012.

== EU-Alert standard ==
The EU-Alert standard (TS 102 900 V1.3.1) as defined by ETSI is the European public warning service using the Cell Broadcast service as a means of delivering public warning messages to the general public. Cell Broadcast is not affected by traffic load; therefore, it is very suitable during a disaster when load spikes of data, SMS and voice calls usage (mass call events) tend to significantly congest mobile networks, as multiple events have shown.

Specific countries using the EU-Alert service are identified by replacing the letters EU with the country identification letters in ISO 3166-1 (for example, NL-Alert), although some countries have their own names for alerting systems.

Two-tone attention sound

Technical standards are outlined in the ETSI TS 102 900 standard as well as the 3GPP TS 23.041 standard, but national implementation varies. Alerts can be geo-targeted, when only phones in a defined geographical area are set to receive an alert. When an alert is received, a notification is shown in a unique format and a dedicated sound is played even if the phone is set to silent: a two-tone attention sound of 853 Hz and 960 Hz sine waves. Cell Broadcast emergency alerts can be broadcast in a local language and an additional language, which will be displayed depending on the user's device language setting. Most phone manufacturers adhere to these standards but have slightly different user interfaces. Similar to emergency calls, devices do not usually need a SIM card to receive alerts.

EU-Alert messages have distinct alert levels, using a message identifier outlined in 3GPP standards. The alert level is defined by the severity of the warning, for example, threat to life, imminent danger or advisory message.

3GPP Message identifier hex code	Alert type	Description	Opt-out
1112	EU-Alert level 1	Highest level of threat where immediate public warning is necessary.	No
1113, 1114, 1120, 1121	EU-Alert level 2	Extreme threat: impending catastrophic natural hazard event such as a severe storm, flooding, volcano, landslide, earthquake, epidemic, hurricane, tsunami or terrorist attack. Including evacuation orders.	Yes
1115–1119, 111A, 1122–1127	EU-Alert level 3	Severe threat: Less serious than the extreme threats, these could be the same types of situations, but on a smaller scale or impact.	Yes
112C	EU-Alert level 4 (EU-Info)	Public safety messages to convey essential, recommended actions that can save lives or property (for example, emergency shelter locations or a boil water order), but are not urgent.	Yes
111B	EU-Amber	Amber alerts: These are specific alerts aimed at locating a missing child.	Yes
(1900)	(EU-Info)	No longer in use: depreciated to EU-Alert level 4	Yes
111C	EU-Monthly Test		Yes
112E	EU-Test	Test messages for national/regional/local purposes.	Yes
111D	EU-Exercise		Yes

Normally, all levels of EU-Alert are treated the same by the device. The same notification type and sound are emitted regardless of level. Depending on national implementation, users may be able to opt-out of receiving lower level alerts. However, the highest level of alert will always be displayed on a user's device.

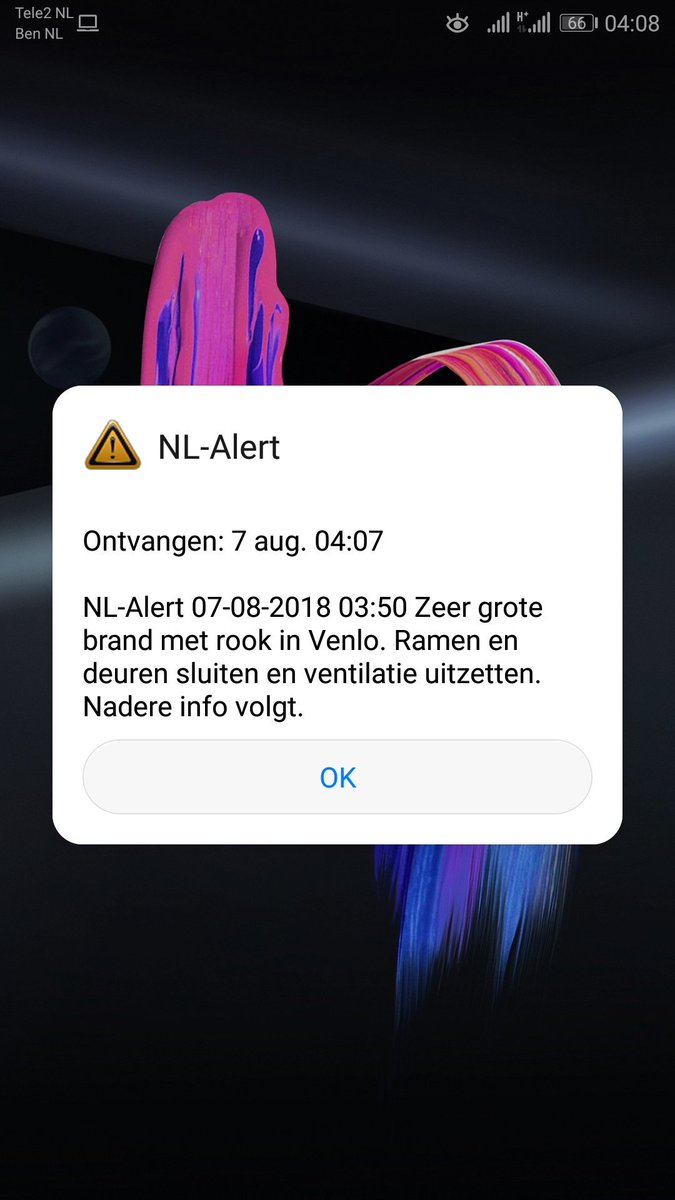
NL-Alert broadcast in the area of Venlo on 7 August 2018 because of a large toxic fire.

Test of the Spanish EU-Alert variant (ES-Alert) in Barcelona in 2023, on an iOS device.

Since 2012, Cell Broadcast has been supported by Android, iOS and Windows Phone. Similar systems based on Cell Broadcast have been used in other countries, for example Wireless Emergency Alerts (US) and Emergency Mobile Alert (New Zealand).

== European Union directive ==
On 11 December 2018, the European Union adopted the directive on the European Electronic Communications Code (EECC). Under the directive, all EU member states must set up a public warning system to protect citizens by 21 June 2022. This system will send alerts to all citizens and visitors mobile phones in a specific area in the event of a natural disaster, terrorist attack or other major emergency in their area. Cell Broadcast is one solution, but LB-SMS may also be acceptable.

According to the directive a public warning system (PWS) must be able to:

- Target the affected population by specific geography so as not to cause widespread panic
- Reach a high percentage of people in the targeted area, not just residents but roaming visitors using their native language
- Send messages in real-time, within seconds and with a high degree of reliability
- Send message without the need for the public to have to opt-in
- The transmission of public warning messages should be free of charge for end-users not just residents but also roaming visitors.

== Implementation by European countries ==
The following countries have an operational EU-Alert system based on the standard using Cell Broadcast technology:

- AT-Alert: the national variant of EU-Alert for Austria.
- BG-Alert: the national variant of EU-Alert for Bulgaria. The official BG-Alert website is only accessible from Bulgaria.
- DE-Alert: the national variant of EU-Alert for Germany.
- ES-Alert: the national variant of EU-Alert for Spain (started testing in October–November 2022, fully operational since early 2023).
- FI-Alert: Launched in November 2026.
- FR-Alert: the national variant of EU-Alert for France (started testing in May 2022). It was implemented nationwide at the end of June 2022.
- GR-Alert: the national variant of EU-Alert for Greece.
- HR-Alert: the national variant of EU-Alert for Croatia (both LB-SMS and Cell Broadcast).
- HU-Alert: the national variant of EU-Alert for Hungary.
- IT-Alert: the national variant of EU-Alert for Italy; launched in February 2024.
- LV-Alert: Launched in July 2025.
- LT-Alert: the national variant of EU-Alert for Lithuania.
- LU-Alert: the national variant of EU-Alert for Luxembourg (previously LB-SMS, upgraded to CB in 2024).
- NL-Alert: the national variant of EU-Alert for the Netherlands.
- Nødvarsel: Norway launched its system in 2023.
- RO-Alert: the national variant of EU-Alert for Romania.
- SE-Alert: the national variant of EU-Alert for Sweden.
- S!RENEN: the national variant of EU-Alert for Denmark. Launched in April 2023, first activated during Denmark's annual national test of the civil defense siren system in May 2023.
- UK Emergency Alert System: Launched in 2023. The UK is not part of the EU but is part of ETSI and is implemented as such.
- SI-Alarm: National variant of EU-Alert for Slovenia.

The following countries are in the implementation or testing stage of EU-Alert system based on the standard using Cell Broadcast technology:

- Cyprus: tender launched
- Czechia: location-Based SMS system in use, due to be upgraded to Cell Broadcast technology starting in 2026, complementing the existing SMS-based system.
- Estonia: EE-Alarm – location-based SMS and two mobile applications in use, upgrade to 5G based Cell Broadcast under development.
- Ireland: IE Alert, set to launch in 2027 with a cost of around €15 million.
- Poland: Alert RCB is a location-Based SMS system in use. Due to be upgraded to Cell Broadcast technology starting in 2023.
- Portugal: location-based SMS system in use, due to be upgraded to Cell Broadcast technology.
- Serbia: due to launch by the end of 2026. The LB-SMS is currently in use.
- Slovakia
- Switzerland

The following countries use Location-Based SMS systems which do not adhere to the ETSI EU-Alert standard, but might fulfil the EU legislation.

- Belgium: BE-Alert, location-based SMS.
- Iceland: location-based SMS.

== Alternative solutions ==
Possible alternative for EU-Alert to use other electronic communications services, such as location based SMS or apps. However, several conditions must be met according to the European Electronic Communications Code:

- As efficient as network-based technologies
- Reception of the alert should be easy
- Information to all visitors entering the country
- Transmission of the alert is free to the user
- Comply with privacy rules

=== Downloadable mobile applications ===
There are several downloadable mobile applications on the market that often warn on natural catastrophes; however, these are often not of official, but part of private initiatives that replicate information from state agencies.

All downloadable mobile applications have the issue that they are highly affected by traffic load as they require mobile data usage; therefore, especially in case of a disaster when load spikes of data (social media, voice and mobile app) tend to significantly slowdown mobile networks, as multiple terrorist attacks showed.

Moreover, downloadable mobile apps needs to be downloaded by subscribers and the experience over the years in many countries is that only a fraction of the population will take the effort to download and use an Emergency Mobile app that is only activated a few times in a year. Examples are in Germany with 1,500,000 downloads of the Katwarn and NINA mobile application, reaching a maximum of 2.5M people in Germany (<3% of the German population) and France only 500,000 downloads of the SAIP mobile application (<1% of the French population) despite large investments in application development and marketing. In France because of the limited success of the downloadable Mobile App SAIP (Système d’Alerte et d’Information des Populations) the service has been stopped as of June 2018.

=== Location-based SMS (LB-SMS) ===
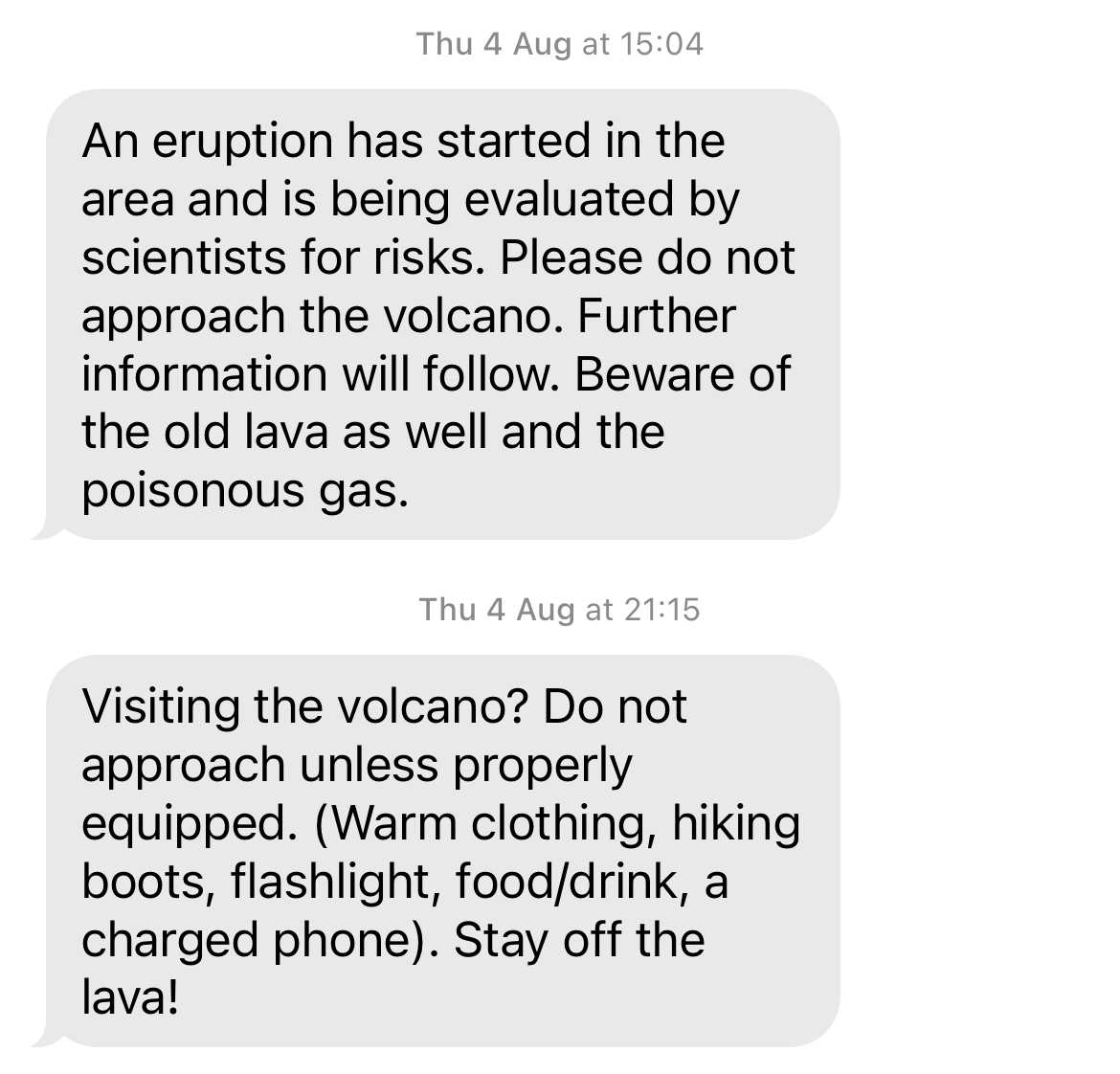
Location-Based SMS message in Iceland during a volcanic eruption. Displays as a regular SMS message from sender '112'.

As far as the network and the end user is concerned, a Location-Based-SMS (LB-SMS) message is simply a normal SMS message which is sent to a subset of the Mobile Network's attached devices, which happen to be in a particular geographical area. In order to achieve this for some mobile network topologies however, the network must maintain a database of all mobile devices in the target location for potential Public Warning Service messages. In other words, for all areas that the Mobile anticipates potentially delivering LB-SMS messages into, a list of all users currently located in those areas must be kept up to date at all times.

While mobile networks require knowledge of subscribers’ locations for normal operation, this is usually not maintained at all times at the granularity of the single cell level. Therefore, an LB-SMS implementation will usually require the deployment of a Mobile Location Cente (MLC). The methods used by the MLC to track mobile devices as they move around the network are not standardised and are subject to a certain level of inaccuracy. Some MLCs track device location to the cell level, whereas other MLC providers claim to fix device location to a greater level of accuracy. Depending on the level of location granularity stored in the MLC, the precision of targeting will vary. There may be privacy implications in tracking user locations in this manner that should be considered.

Aside from the location specific aspect, the principle difference between CB and LB-SMS services is that the mobile network for location based SMS must carry each recipient's message separately, since the SMS standards do not have a ‘one-to-many’ or a broadcast capability.

LB-SMS messages look and behave the same was as any other SMS message a user would receive, and the user has no way of verifying that the message is coming from an authorised/authoritative source other than the sending identifier (often '112', which can be easily spoofed).

The Swedish Civil Contingencies Agency concluded in a report published in May 2018 that in case of serious events it's extremely unlikely that Public Warning Messages via SMS will work and will be delivered in a timely manner (less than 1 minute).

==== Disadvantages ====
Disadvantages of using location-based SMS in national public warning systems are:

- No international recognized telecommunication standardization body has defined a standard for location based SMS for Public Warning Services.
- Scalability. While mobile networks are dimensioned to carry millions of messages per day, MNOs assume a relatively flat distribution across the network in terms of both time and location. In other words, the average number of messages per second in a given cell is relatively low even in a busy network. In some alerting use cases however (for example notifying all users in a particular area by SMS) it would be possible for the radio access network to be flooded by SMS messages. In this case, messages which cannot be delivered on the first attempt are usually queued up on the MNO SMSC for further delivery attempts. In the worst case, the mobile network could take hours to deliver all queued warning messages.
- Delivery time of Location Based SMS warning messages to groups of people in the Geo-target area are long and are depending on the number of people present in the area, it can take up to several hours to reach 300,000 people in a city, for example in the May 2018 Sweden case and in the September 2019 Portugal case.
- Due to the nature of international SMS routing (SMS Home routing). It should also be noted that LB SMS messages will often not reach inbound roamers as delivery of Short code based messages abroad are blocked by the home operator due to roaming charging agreement (AA19).
- The granularity of an LB-SMS warning message will depend on the accuracy of the MLC in the MNOs network, usually a single cell which has radius between 3 and 25 km (2 and 16 miles).
- LB-SMS warning messages will not produce notifications sounds or a ringtone and vibration different than an ordinary SMS message, thus end users could easily overlook warning messages.
- LB SMS messages can be easily faked and would require the deployment of security devices, for example SMS firewall on each mobile operator international SS7 signaling links.
- When sending an LB-SMS a delivery receipt could be requested upon message submission to the MNOs SMSC. This receipt provides information about the delivery of the message to the end user device only, with no indication whether the message has been read or not. However, these delivery receipt messages may increase the network load for a given alerting event, the impact of which should be considered.

== See also ==
- EUwarn
- Reverse 1-1-2
- Cell Broadcast
- Early warning system
- Emergency communication system
- Emergency population warning broadcasting

== Sources ==
- "5G Americas White Paper Public Warning Systems in the Americas" (PDF). www.5gamericas.org. 5G Americas. July 2018.
- "Mobile Network Public Warning Systems and the Rise of Cell-Broadcast" (PDF). www.gsma.com. GSMA. January 2013.
