= Nødvarsel =

Emergency population warning system used in Norway

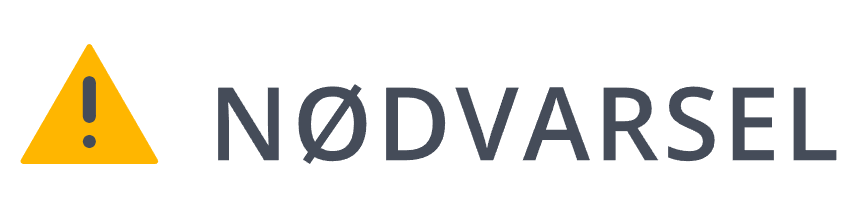
Logo for Nødvarsel

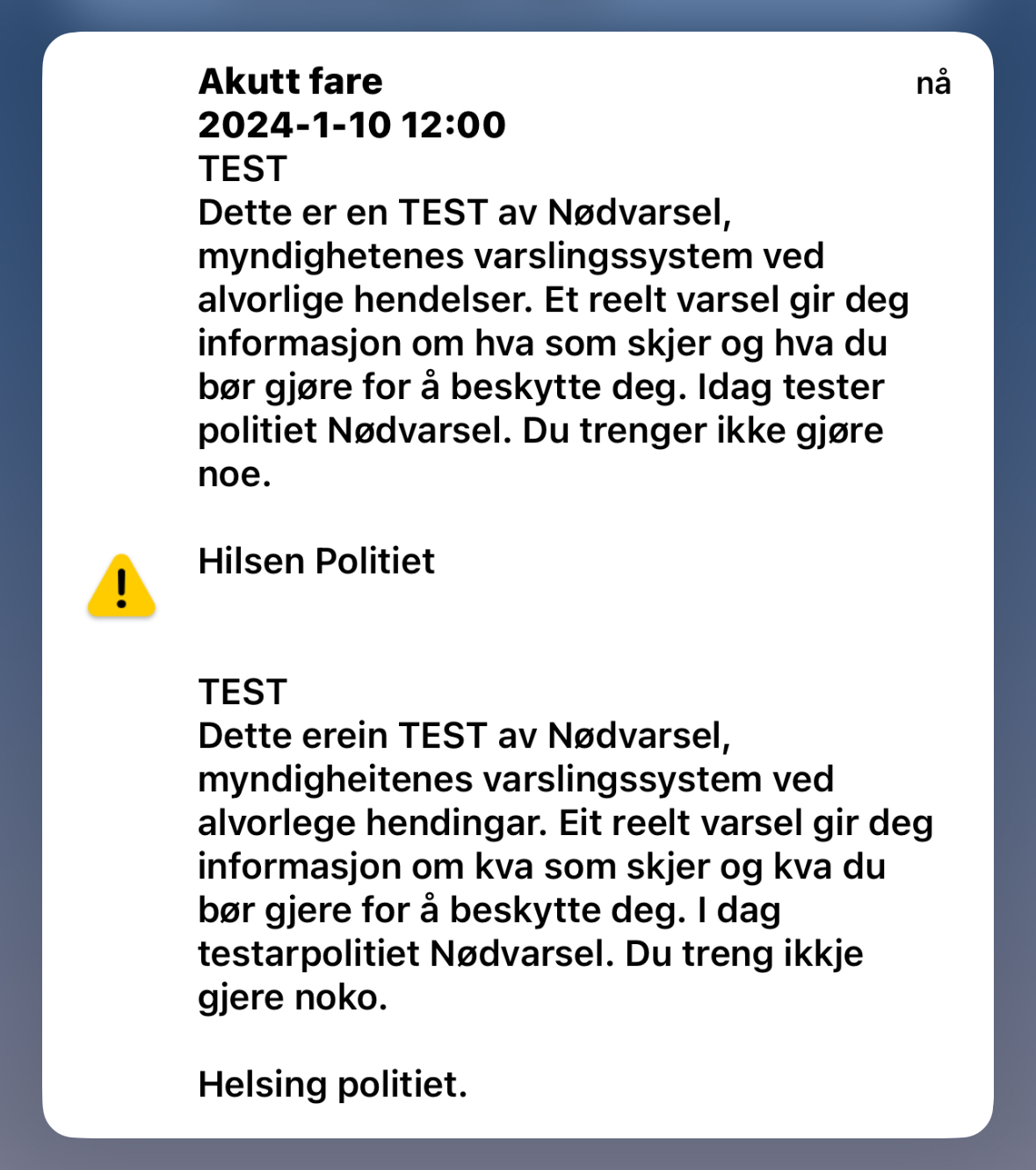
Technical test of Nødvarsel in written Bokmål and Nynorsk.

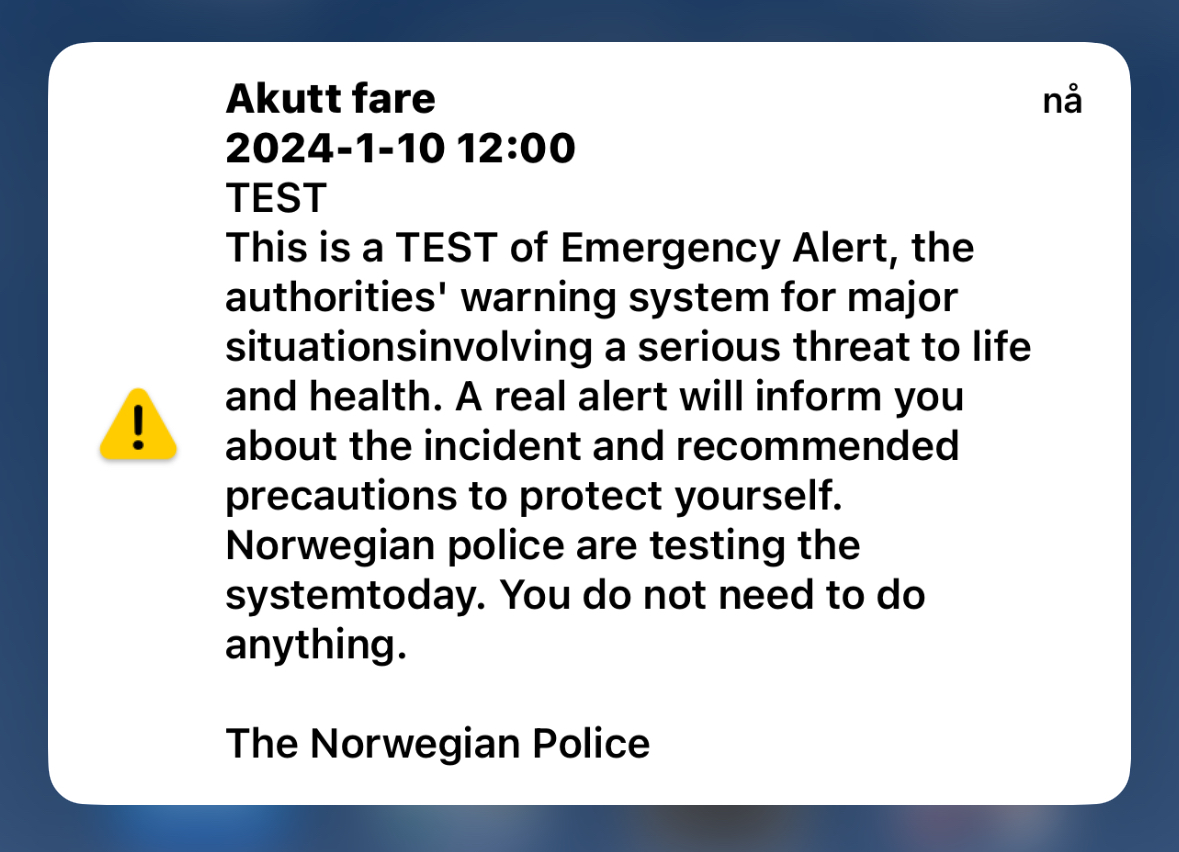
The same test as above in English.

Nødvarsel (English: Emergency Alert) is a Cell Broadcast alarm system in use by the Norwegian government to quickly alert and inform citizens of hazardous or crisis situations. Using this system, authorities can send messages to users of mobile phones in specific areas by using specific cell towers to alert phones within their reach.

The system was launched on 10 January 2023 and is a common effort between the Police Service, the Directorate for Civil Protection and the Civil Defence in cooperation with the telecommunications companies that run the mobile networks of Norway; Telenor, Telia and Ice.

It is implemented based upon a European Union directive requiring member states (Norway is a member state in the EEA) to have a digital as well as physical public warning system. This directive is commonly known as EU-Alert.

== See also ==
- Early warning system
- Emergency communication system
- Emergency population warning broadcasting
