= FR-Alert =

French emergency population warning system

FR-Alert is a national emergency population warning system in France using cell broadcast technology. It is used by French authorities (prefects or mayors) to quickly alert and inform the public via mobile phones in case of an imminent or ongoing major emergency or disaster. The term red alert (vigilance rouge) indicates immediate danger to life or physical safety. The system is linked to both the French SAIP system and the European EU-Alert framework.

Within the danger zone, FR-Alert provides information on the nature of the crisis and the behavior to adopt to ensure safety.

It requires operational electrical grid and mobile telephony networks to function.

== Description ==
This is a national system, based on the EU-wide EU-Alert standard defined in the European Electronic Communications Code, which sets harmonized specifications for public warning services.

Developed and deployed by Intersec, it has been operational since June 21, 2022. It allows authorities to send indiscriminate alerts to mobile phone users. Messages are broadcast within specific zones using cell towers from mobile network operators. It complements the SAIP system.

The majority of mobile operating systems (such as Android and iOS) support cell broadcast by default and offer settings to manage alerts.

== Gallery ==
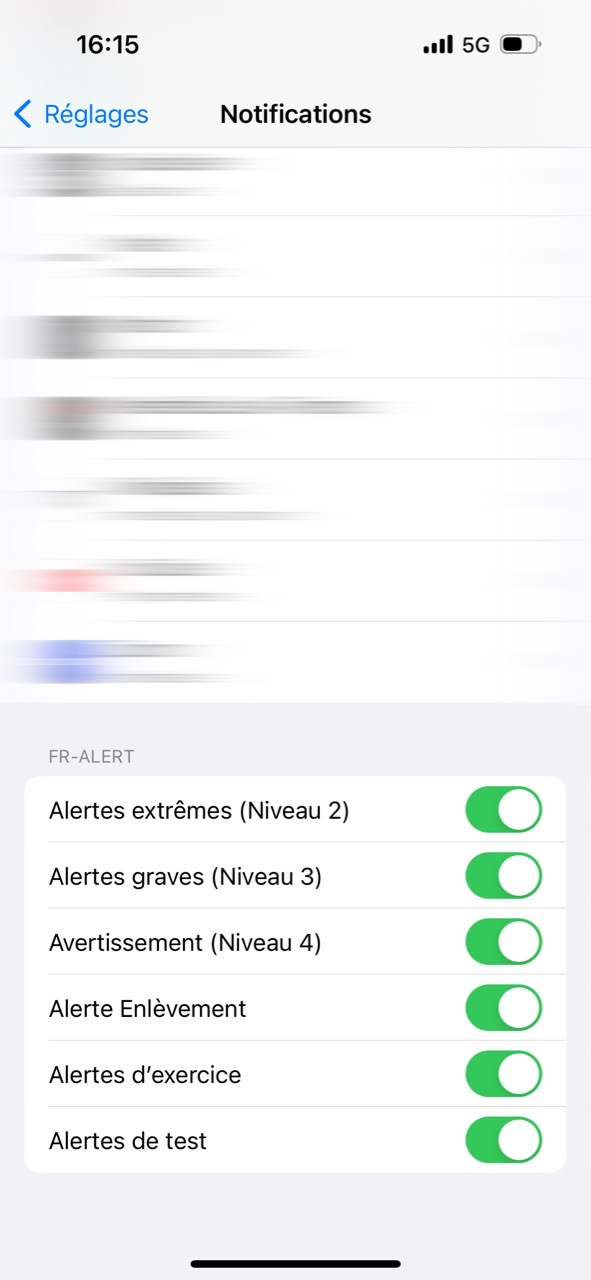
iPhone settings for FR-Alert

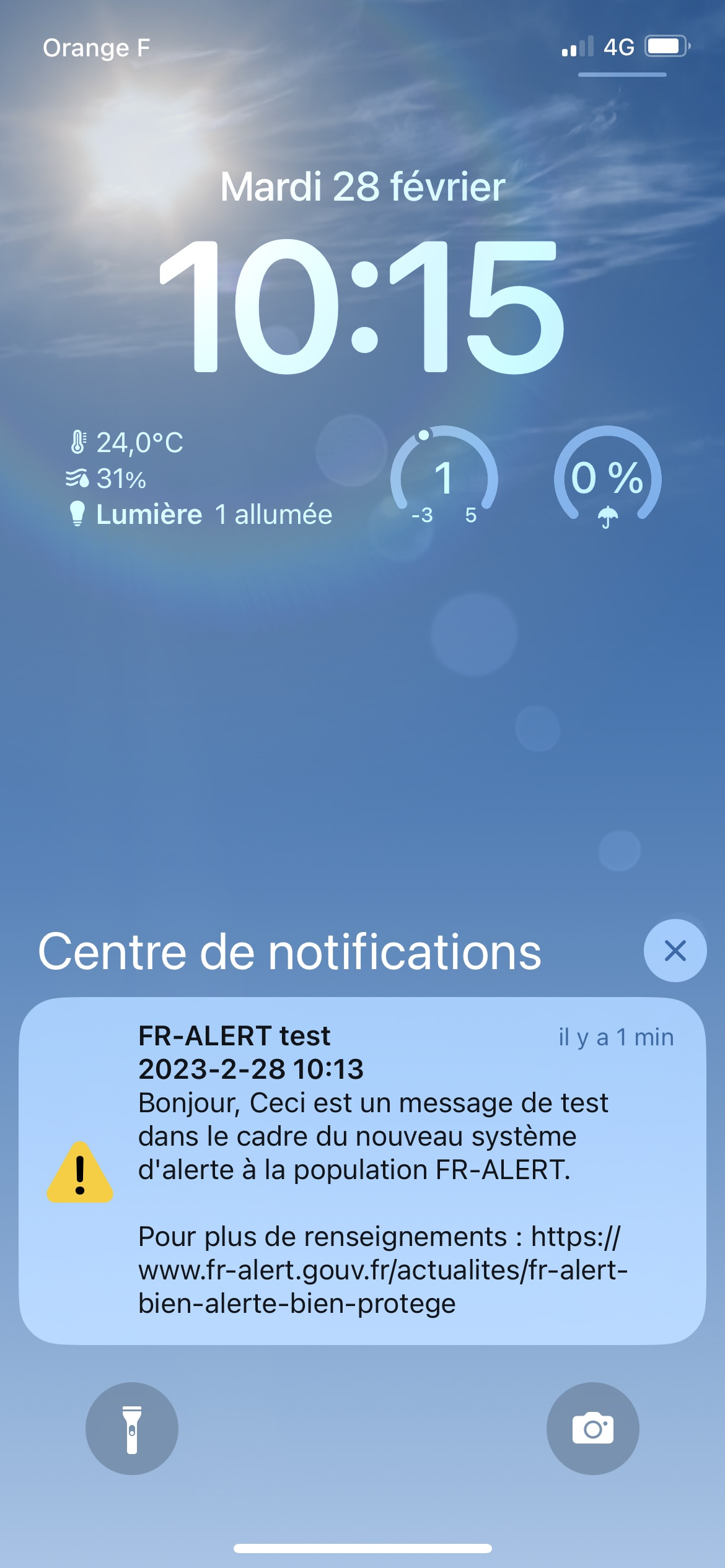
FR-Alert message on iPhone

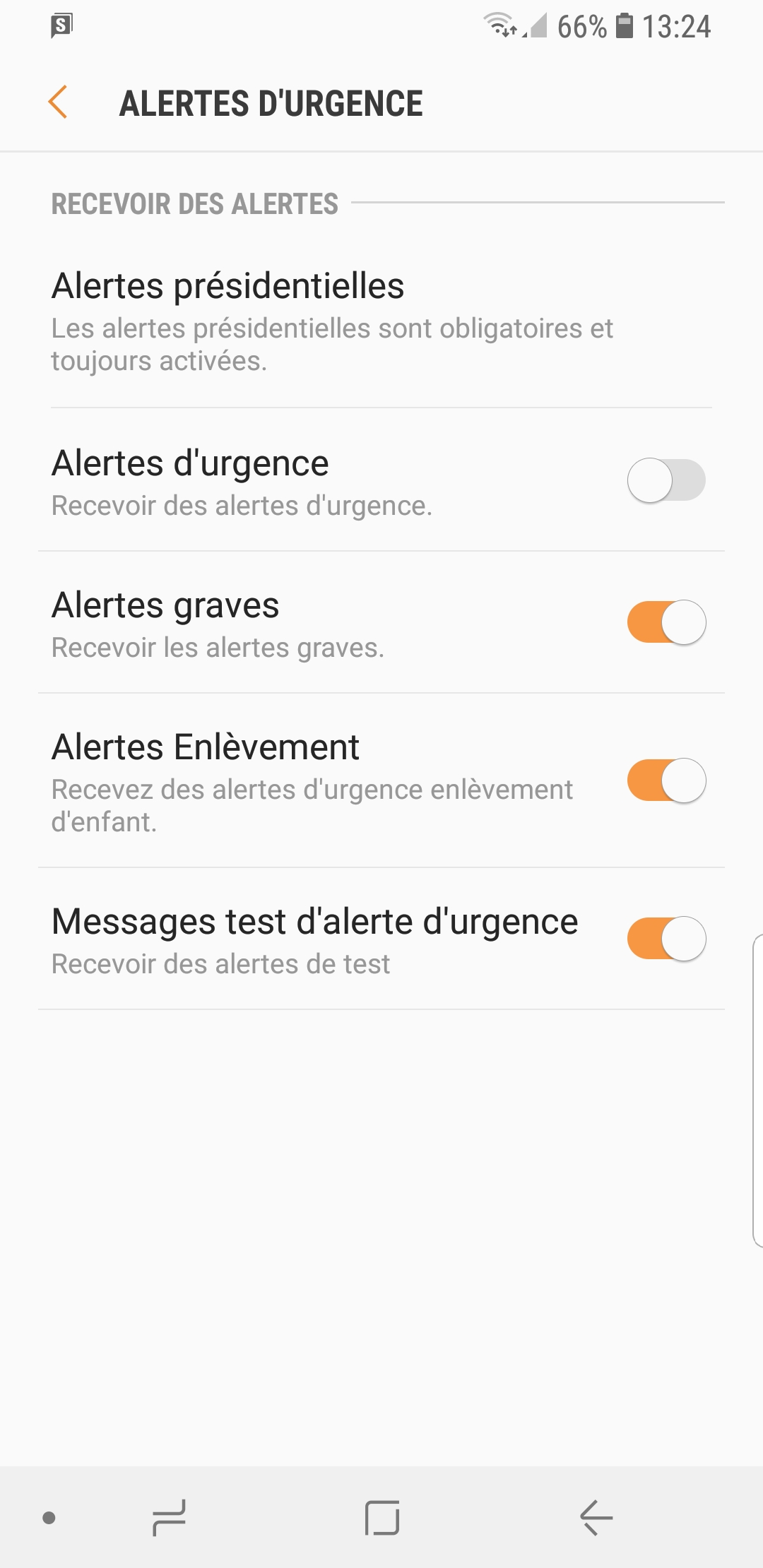
Android settings for FR-Alert

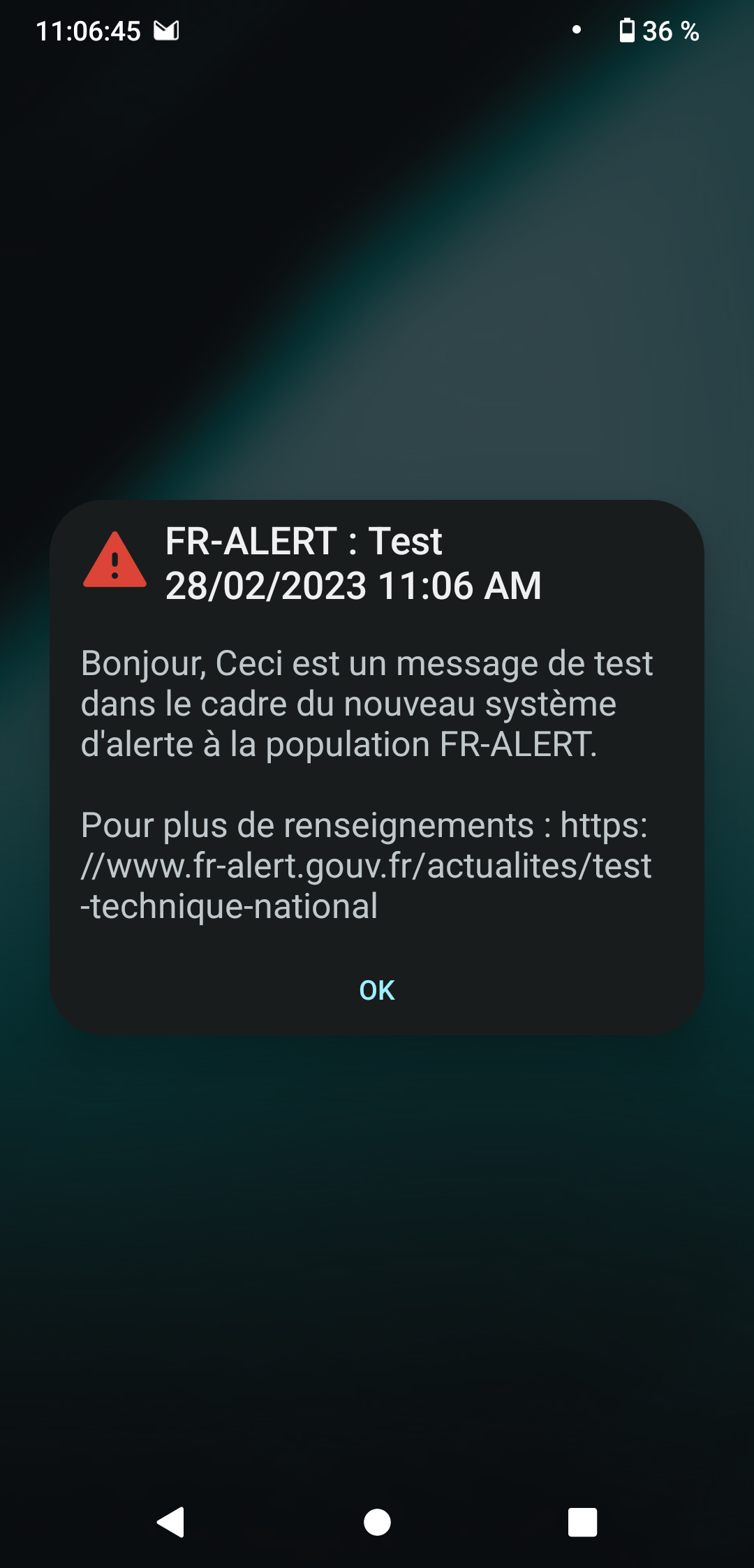
FR-Alert message on Android

== Technology ==
Alerts are transmitted via radio waves using cell broadcast through 4G and 5G antennas, not via SMS, to avoid network saturation. Any user within a 5 kilometres (3.1 mi) radius receives the alert with a specific sound, even if the phone is in silent mode. The broadcast can be supplemented with geolocated 2G or 3G SMS, though these may be delayed.

== Activation ==
The decision to send an alert is made by the Prime Minister or prefects, although mayors may request activation in local emergencies.

Since June 2022, several tests have been conducted. These range from technical test messages to live crisis scenarios, including an alert on 28 February 2023 across metropolitan France.

FR-Alert was first triggered for a real event on 11 July 2023 in five eastern French departments (Franche-Comté and Haut-Rhin) for severe thunderstorm warnings. Ironically, the most affected areas were Côte-d'Or and Bas-Rhin, which were not under red alert.

On 13 May 2024, FR-Alert was controversially triggered by the Paris Police Prefecture to send an informational message related to the 2024 Summer Olympics. Critics deemed the alert disproportionate as there was no actual emergency.

It was also tested in the La Rochelle urban area on 9–10 April 2025 as part of a storm crisis management drill, Exercise ÉOLE 2025.

== Research and development ==
In 2023–2024, under France's ecological transition program (France Nation Verte), discussions began to integrate FR-Alert into climate and biodiversity-related emergency planning.

There's growing awareness of mixed-risk scenarios — e.g., a technological disaster triggered by a natural hazard — such as the Fukushima nuclear disaster, caused by an earthquake and tsunami.

The World Health Organization (WHO) also stresses better preparedness for mental health risks. Retrospective disaster studies show underestimated mental health effects, especially for children and pregnant women exposed to disasters.
