= EUwarn =

Emergency warning system via App

EUwarn (proper spelling: EUWARN) – also KATWARN international – is an internal warning system used by the European Commission in Brussels and Luxembourg, as well as the Austrian Federal Ministry of the Interior to disseminate internal warning messages within the organisation via smartphone app in dangerous situations (for example, major fires, power outages, terrorist attacks, or pandemics).

The system is technically based on the KATWARN warning system, which has been in use in Germany since 2011, and is networked through roaming technology.

== Functionality ==
=== Receiving alerts (multi-channel technology) ===
In order to disseminate warnings to internal and external target groups, EUwarn uses digitally networked communication channels (EUwarn app, on-board computers, smarthome, wearables, displays, portals, etc.) – so-called "multi-channel." The EUwarn system is a multi-channel system. The system is based on the European warning and information system according to Article 110 EU Directive (EU) 2018/1972.

In addition, the system can be used to communicate via different channels in order to best reach target groups (local and area warnings, group and authority warnings, topic and info channels).

Since EUwarn is based on Katwarn technology, which is widely used in Germany, and is roaming-enabled, the Katwarn app can also be used to receive EUwarn alerts.

=== Issuing Warnings (multi-hazard technology) ===
Through the use of international standards (for example, CAP (common alerting protocol)) and a secure editorial and administration platform, control centers and security centers as well as external information systems (for example, for severe weather, floods, earthquakes, "predictive policing") can be connected to the system – so-called "multi-hazard".

Warnings and warning channels can be created and sent via the editorial and administration platform, and comprehensive administrative actions can be carried out (language selection, event and area configurations, etc.).

=== Multilingualism ===
EUwarn is multi-language capable, such as depending on the system settings of the smartphone, the app displays warnings in the respective language or – as default – in English. Templates for different languages can be prepared and, if necessary, automatically activated.

=== Technology ===
Developed by of the Fraunhofer Society, EUwarn is subject to constant further development in exchange with authorities, security organizations and industry. In doing so, the principles of "privacy by design" and "privacy by default" as well as the requirements of the General Data Protection Regulation (GDPR) are followed consistently.

The EUwarn system, like the Katwarn system, is based on a microservice infrastructure. This exists decentralized on several servers and thus allows for a fast and reliable distribution of warnings.

Warnings are primarily distributed via the smartphone-app, but email and SMS can be used as additional warning channels.

== Tsunami drill ==
The European Commission's evaluation of a tsunami drill on the island of Kos shows that Katwarn-international is crucial for quickly warning those affected. During the 2019 drill, Katwarn-international was the only warning app used, along with other warning channels such as sirens, scoreboards and loudspeakers.

On 21 November 2019, the European Commission's Joint Research Centre (JRC) tested technology and procedures from the EU Tsunami Last Mile project. During the drill, EUwarn (or Katwarn-international) was used to send a tsunami warning to the participants and give them instructions on how to evacuate. The evaluation showed that a complete dissemination of the warning message was only possible by using Katwarn. For example, since sirens could not be heard in classrooms, the only way to reach a school class was through the Katwarn app on a teacher's smartphone.

== See also ==
- Early warning system
- Emergency communication system
- Emergency population warning broadcasting
