= Intersec =

French technology company

- Type: Private
- Industry: Software; Telecommunications
- Founded: 2004; 22 years ago in Paris, France
- Founders: Yann Chevalier; Jean-Marc Coïc; Olivier Guillaumin
- Headquarters: Puteaux, France
- Area served: Worldwide
- Key people: Yann Chevalier (CEO)
- Products: Intersec Agora platform Intersec AI
- Services: Location intelligence Public warning systems Telecom metadata analytics Geolocation software
- Website: intersec.com

Intersec is a French technology company that specializes in AI, metadata and location intelligence services. It is based in Puteaux, France.

== History ==
Intersec was founded in 2004 by Yann Chevalier, Jean-Marc Coïc and Olivier Guillaumin. In its initial years, it was mainly known for its SMS software developed for telecom operators. The company has since expanded its operations and now develops software applications that process big data from telecommunications operators internationally.

In May 2022, Intersec deployed the FR-Alert system, which sends emergency notifications to mobile phones in areas affected by disasters or attacks in France. The company has since deployed national public warning systems in several other countries, including Germany, Croatia, Slovenia, and Luxembourg.

In 2023, Intersec became a member of the International Telecommunication Union (ITU) to further adoption of early warning systems. Intersec is also a member of the European Emergency Number Association (EENA), the European Telecommunications Standards Institute (ETSI), contributes to the Linux Foundation's CAMARA project, and has worked with the TM Forum on disaster recovery initiatives. It was also part of the StopCovid contributor ecosystem in France.

== Platform ==
Intersec's location platform combines multiple location technologies to determine device location with an accuracy of a few meters in urban areas. It processes telecommunications metadata to enable applications for disaster resilience, emergency services, LEA investigations, and telecom innovation.

In addition to public warning system, Intersec provides geolocation and 5G intelligence services for telecom operators in Europe, the Middle East, North America, and Africa.

In 2025, Intersec launched Intersec AI, designed to enhance capabilities and assist users with domain-specific AI agents. In the same year, Intersec completed its transition to a subscription-based model. It also includes CAMARA-compliant APIs for secure telecom integration.

== Investors ==
Member of the La french Tech, Intersec raised 4 million euros in 2011, followed by 20 million dollars in 2014, and 10 million dollars in 2016.

In 2025, Tikehau Capital and Revaia have agreed to acquire a majority stake in Intersec.
