= Hong Kong Emergency Alert System =

Cell broadcast emergency alert system

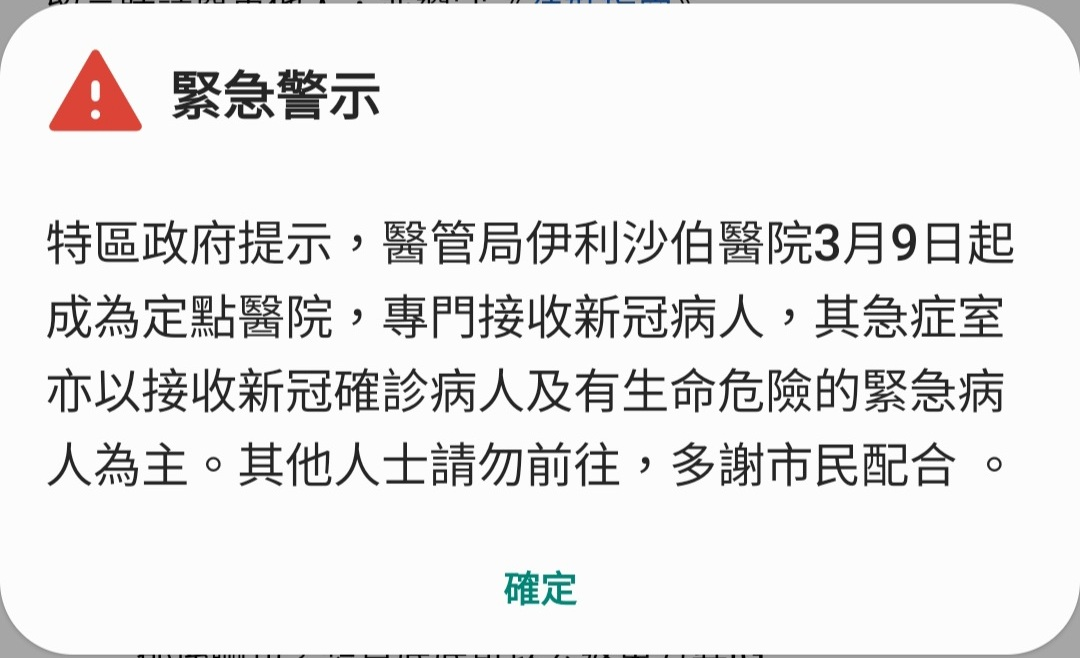
An alert message of the system in Chinese.

The Hong Kong Emergency Alert System (Chinese: 緊急警示系統; EAS) is a cell broadcast emergency alert system for emergency warnings issued by the government of Hong Kong. The system was established in 2020 at a cost of HK$150 million and is managed by the Office of the Communications Authority. The Emergency Alert System uses cell broadcast technology to send instant electronic messages to mobile phones connected to the mobile network, rather than traditional text messages.

The system was used on March 9, 2022, to inform the public that a hospital would be receiving mainly COVID-19 patients. As of 2025, the system has not been used since.

== History ==
In February 2020, the Commerce and Economic Development Bureau applied to the Finance Committee of the Legislative Council for a grant of HK$150 million from the "Anti-epidemic Fund" to establish the Emergency Alert System. It was believed that the establishment of a warning system would shorten the time for the transmission of messages while allowing messages to be sent to all users of smartphones in Hong Kong. In April 2020, the Finance Committee of the Legislative Council approved the relevant funding application, with the warning system officially launched in November of the same year. Before this, the Hong Kong government had used text messages for the distribution of emergency alerts.

== Operations ==
The government planned to use the system to send real-time important information to mobile phone users in emergency situations that endangered lives and property.

Two alert levels exist for EAS messages, the “Emergency Alert" and the "Extreme Emergency Alert,” with the government to designate the alert level according to the urgency or severity of the circumstances.

When the government issues an alert, smartphones supporting cell broadcast service technology, with the cell broadcast feature enabled, will generate an audio alarm signal together with vibration for about ten seconds, to alert users of the reception of an EAS message. The system was used for the first time in March 2022, and as of 2025 has not been used since. Users are unable to change the alert ringtone and vibration, nor to opt out of messages designated as "Extreme Emergency Alert" messages.

== First application ==
The EAS system was first used on 9 March 2022, with the following message being displayed to warn the public of the conversion of Queen Elizabeth Hospital into a "designated hospital" for COVID-19 patients.

HKSAR Government alerts you that starting from 9 March, Queen Elizabeth Hospital (QEH) of the Hospital Authority has been converted into a 'designated hospital' to receive COVID-19 patients. A&E of QEH will admit mainly COVID-19 patients and patients in life-threatening conditions. Other patients are advised not to go QEH. Thank you for the cooperation.
特區政府提示，醫管局伊利沙伯醫院3月9日起成為定點醫院，專門接收新冠病人，其急症室亦以接收新冠確診病人及有生命危險的緊急病人為主。其他人士請勿前往，多謝市民配合。

The distribution of the message was widely criticised at the time by the public and several legislative councillors, as many mistook the alert to warn of situations similar to an airstrike or an earthquake. Chief Executive Carrie Lam defended the action, saying that it was appropriate to warn the public of the conversion of the hospital, as the hospital was the busiest in its hospital cluster, the Kowloon Central cluster.

== Further use of system ==
The system has not been used since March 2022. The government has been questioned for not using the system during the widespread rainstorm and floods in September 2023, which severely affected Hong Kong. The practicality of the system has also been questioned.
