= Cell Broadcast =

Method of sending messages to multiple mobile phone users

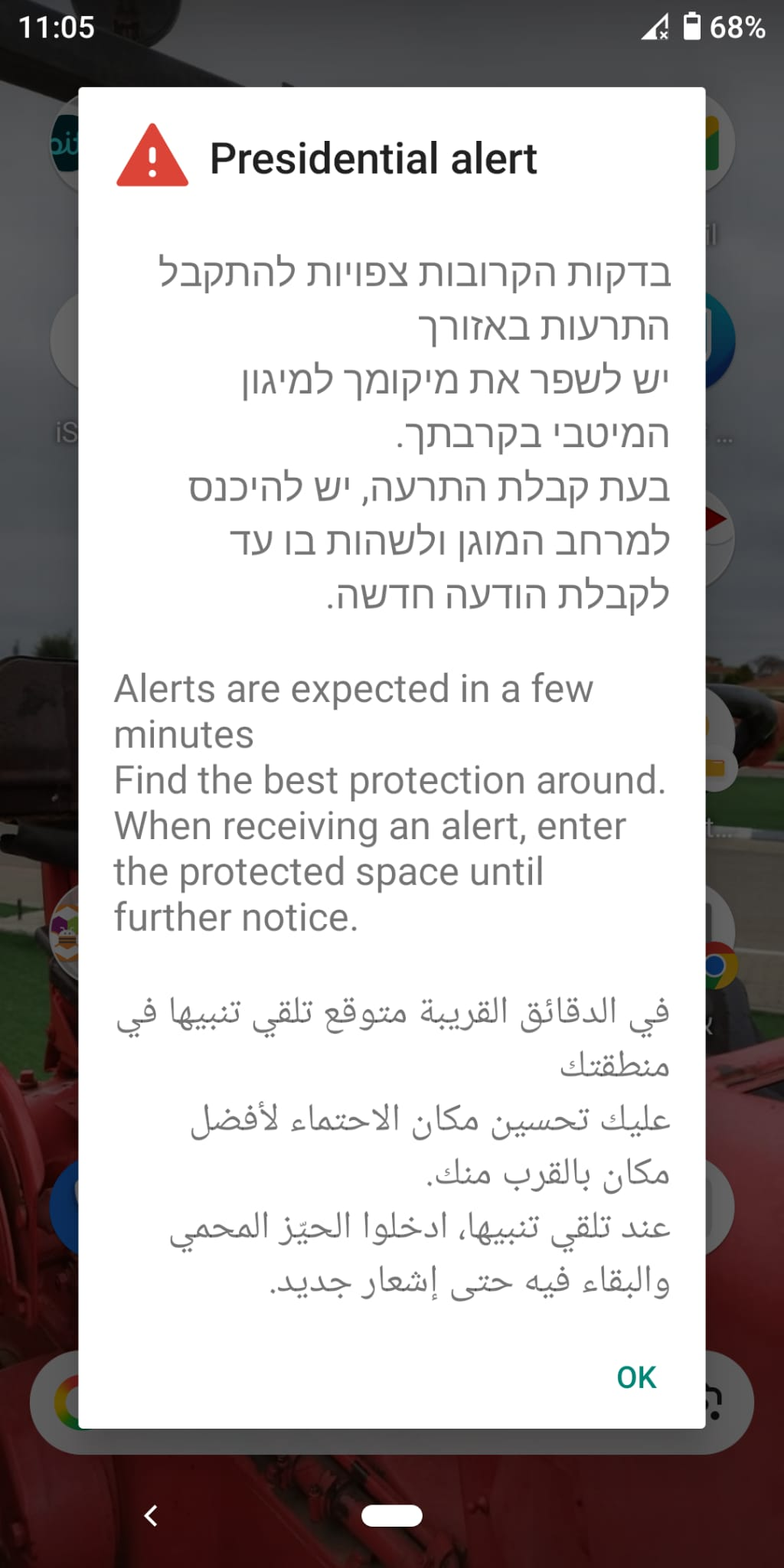
Warning alert sent by the Israeli Home Front Command, during the 2026 Iran war.

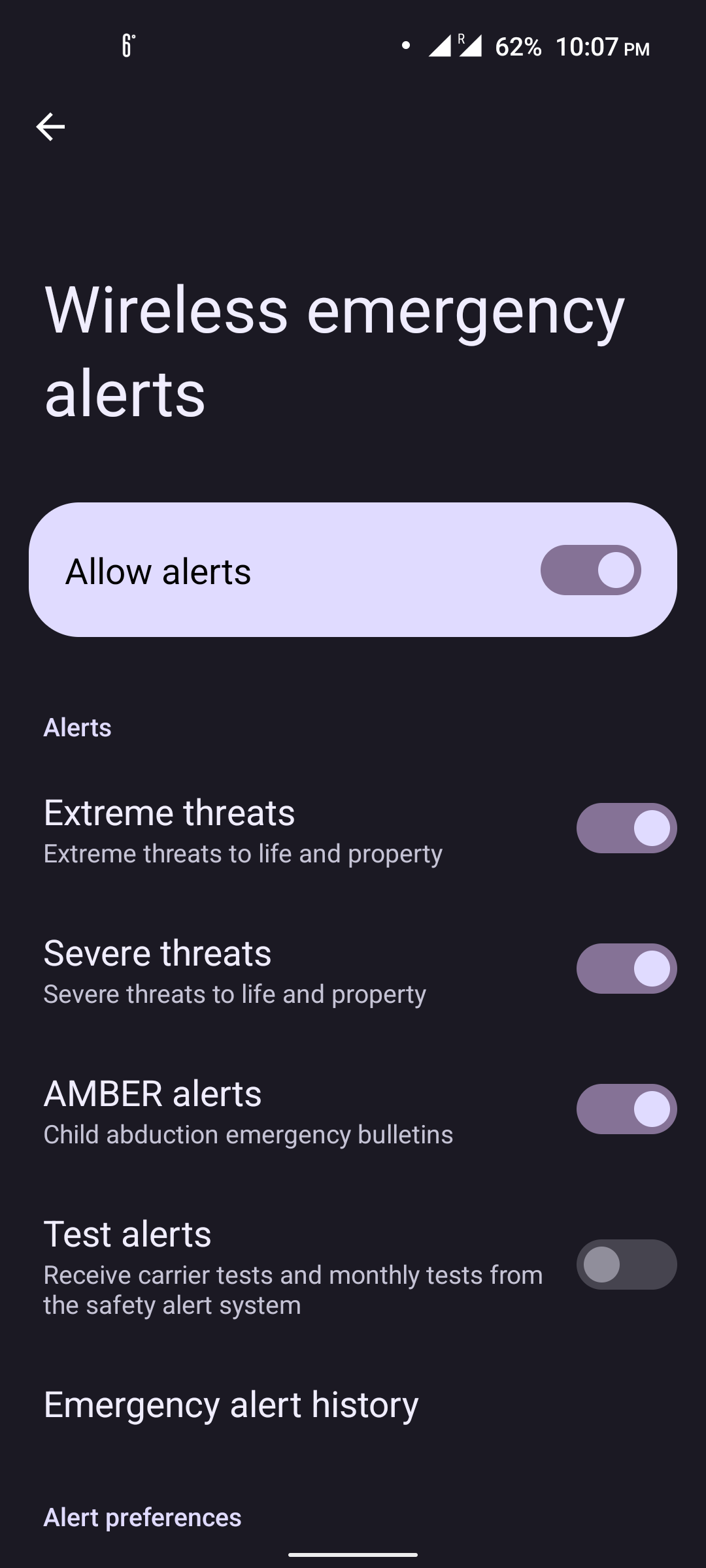
Public warning alerts using embedded Cell Broadcast feature on Android 12

Cell Broadcast (CB) is a method of simultaneously sending short messages to multiple mobile telephone users in a defined area. It is defined by the ETSI's GSM committee and 3GPP and is part of the 2G, 3G, 4G and 5G standards. It is also known as Short Message Service-Cell Broadcast (SMS-CB or CB SMS).

Cell Broadcast is different from the regular Short Message Service (which is also called Short Message Service-Point to Point / SMS-PP to distinguish it). Cell Broadcast is a one-to-many geo-targeted and geo-fenced messaging service, which typically targets all handsets connected to a specific network cell. Cell Broadcast technology is widely used for public warning systems.

== History ==
Cell Broadcast messaging was first demonstrated in Paris in 1997. Some mobile operators used Cell Broadcast for communicating the area code of the antenna cell to the mobile user (via channel 050), for nationwide or citywide alerting, weather reports, mass messaging, location-based news, etc. Cell broadcast has been widely deployed since 2008 by major Asian, US, Canadian, South American and European network operators. Not all operators have the Cell Broadcast messaging function activated in their network yet, but most of the currently used handsets support cell broadcast, however on many devices it is disabled by default and there isn't a standardised interface to enable the feature.

== Technology ==
One Cell Broadcast message can reach a large number of telephones at once. Cell Broadcast messages are directed to specific radio cells of a mobile phone network, rather than to a specific telephone. The latest generation of Cell Broadcast Systems (CBS) can send to the whole mobile network (e.g. 1,000,000 cells) in less than 10 seconds, reaching millions of mobile subscribers at the same time. A Cell Broadcast message is an unconfirmed push service, meaning that the originators of the messages do not know who has received the message, allowing for services based on anonymity. Cell Broadcast is compliant with the latest EU General Data Protection Regulation (GDPR) as mobile phone numbers are not required by CB. The originator (alerting authority) of the Cell Broadcast message can request the success rate of a message. In such a case the Cell Broadcast System will respond with the number of addressed cells and the number of cells that have broadcast the Cell Broadcast (alert) message.

Each radio cell covers a certain geographic area, typically a few kilometers in diameter, so by only sending the Cell Broadcast message to specific radio cells, the broadcast can be limited to a specific area (geotargeting). This is useful for messages that are only relevant in a specific area, such as flood warnings.

The CB message parameters contain the broadcasting schedule. If the start-time is left open, the CBC system will assume an immediate start, which will be the case for Public Warning messages. If the end-time is left open, the message will be repeated indefinitely. A subsequent cancel message shall be used to stop this message. The repetition rate can be set between 2 seconds and to values beyond 30 minutes. Each repeated CB message will have the same message identifier (indicating the source of the message), and the same serial number. Using this information, the mobile telephone is able to identify and ignore broadcasts of already received messages.

A Cell Broadcast message page is composed of 82 octets, which, using the default character set, can encode 93 characters. Up to 15 of these pages may be concatenated to form a Cell Broadcast message (hence maximum length of one Cell Broadcast message is therefore 1395 characters).

A Cell Broadcast Centre (CBC), a system which is the source of SMS-CB message, is connected to a Base Station Controller (BSC) in GSM networks, to a Radio Network Controller (RNC) in UMTS networks, to a Mobility Management Entity (MME) in LTE networks or to a core Access and Mobility management Function (AMF) in 5G networks.

The technical implementation of the Cell Broadcast service is described in the 3GPP specification TS 23.041

- The 2G-CBC (BSC) interface is described in 3GPP standard TS 48.049; however, non-standard implementations exist.
- The 3G-CBC (RNC) interface is described in 3GPP standard TS 25.419.
- The 4G-CBC (MME) interface is described in 3GPP standard TS 29.168.
- The 5G-CBC (AMF) interface is described in 3GPP standard TS 29.518.

A CBC sends CB messages, a list of cells where messages are to be broadcast, and the requested repetition rate and number of times they shall be broadcast to the BSC/RNC/MME/AMF. The BSC's/RNC's/MME/AMF responsibility is to deliver the CB messages to the base stations (BTSs), Node Bs, ENodeBs and gNodeBs which handle the requested cells.

== Public warning systems ==
Cell broadcast is not affected by traffic load; therefore, it is very suitable during a disaster when load spikes of data (social media and mobile apps), regular SMS and voice calls usage (mass call events) tend to significantly congest mobile networks, as multiple events have shown.

Public warning systems, otherwise known as emergency alert systems, implemented through cell broadcast technology vary by country, but are broadly the same. Technical standards are outlined in the 3GPP TS 23.041 standard. Large implementations mentioned in 3GPP standards are Wireless Emergency Alerts (CMAS) in the United States and EU-Alert in Europe (set out in ETSI standards, but national implementation varies). Alerts can be geo-targeted, when only phones in a defined geographical area are set to receive an alert. When an alert is received, a notification is shown in a unique format and a dedicated sound is played even if the phone is set to silent: a two-tone attention sound of 853 Hz and 960 Hz sine waves, as prescribed by both WEA (CMAS) and ETSI standards. Cell Broadcast emergency alerts can be broadcast in a local language and an additional language, which will be displayed depending on the user's device language setting. Most phone manufacturers adhere to these standards but have slightly different user interfaces. Similar to emergency calls, devices do not usually need a SIM card to receive alerts. Emergency alerts in most implementations of cell broadcast have distinct alert categories or levels, using a message identifier outlined in 3GPP standards. The alert category or level is defined by the severity of the warning, e.g. threat to life, imminent danger or advisory message. Depending on national implementation, users may be able to opt-out of receiving lower level alerts. However, the highest level of alert will usually always be displayed on a user's device.

Below is a comparison table on alert categories/levels across systems (based on the common 3GPP message identifiers):

| 3GPP Message Identifier Hex code | Wireless Emergency Alerts (CMAS) | EU-Alert (ETSI) | Opt-out |
|---|---|---|---|
| 1112 | National Alert (Presidential Alert) | EU-Alert Level 1 | No |
| 1113, 1114, 1120, 1121 | Extreme Alert | EU-Alert Level 2 | Yes |
| 1115-1119, 111A, 1122–1127 | Severe Alert | EU-Alert Level 3 | Yes |
| 112C | Public Safety Alert | EU-Alert Level 4 | Yes |
| 111B | Amber Alert | EU-Amber | Yes |
| 1900 | - | EU-Info (depreciated to Level 4) | Yes |
| 111C | Required Monthly Test | EU-Monthly Test | Yes |
| 112E | State/Local Test | EU-Test | Yes |
| 111D | Exercise | EU-Exercise | Yes |

When roaming, if the user's home carrier supports Cell Broadcast emergency alerts, alerts will be displayed if the category/level of alert is enabled and equivalent to their home carrier's system.

Cell Broadcast messages can use a CAP (Common Alerting Protocol) message as an input as specified by OASIS or the Wireless Emergency Alerts (WEA) C-interface protocol, which has been specified jointly by the Alliance for Telecommunications Industry Solutions (ATIS) and the Telecommunications Industry Association (TIA).

Advantages of using Cell Broadcast for Public warning are:

- Sending out a Cell Broadcast message to a few or millions of people takes less than 10 seconds
- Cell Broadcast has a unique and dedicated ringtone and vibration
- Only an authorized authority and the serving mobile network are able to send out the Cell Broadcast messages
- 99% of all handsets used today support Cell Broadcast
- Cell Broadcast supports a maximum message length of 1,395 characters in the Latin alphabet, and 615 characters in Universal Coded Character Set (UCS-2) encoding in order to support other alphabets such as Arabic, Chinese, Urdu, or Greek.
- Cell Broadcast supports multiple languages
- Cell Broadcast supports the use of URLs and Web-links in the alert message
- Cell Broadcast supports targeting a specific geographic area (geotargeting); only devices connected to a base station in that area will receive the message
- Cell Broadcast supports the update within seconds of existing alert messages due to changing hazard situations
- Cell Broadcast supports the mechanism to inform and instruct people within seconds in the adjacent hazard areas
- Cell Broadcast is able to reach all mobile subscribers including roaming subscribers (in their own language)
- Cell Broadcast is not affected by mobile network congestion
- Cell Broadcast is not affected by access class barring and or SIM class barring
- Cell Broadcast is not affected by any data protection constraints as no personal data (subscriber identity or MSISDN) is required and used to deliver the message.
- Cell Broadcast can be used to address people present in an individual cell sector or large polygons covering a complete city or country.
- Cell Broadcast messages can be updated as incident conditions change during an event at the end of an event an all-clear can be given.
- Cell Broadcast is suitable for monthly or half yearly national public warning awareness tests
- Cell Broadcast enablement in the mobile network has no influence on the battery life of mobile devices

== Cell Broadcast adoption rate ==
Countries that have adopted Cell Broadcast, as of 2026 Available Under Development No data

A point of criticism in the past on Cell Broadcast was that there was no uniform user experience on all mobile devices in a country.

Wireless Emergency Alerts and Government alerts using Cell Broadcast are supported in most models of mobile telephones. Some smart phones have a configuration menu that offer opt-out capabilities for certain public warning severity levels.

In case a national civil defence organisation is adopting one of the 3GPP's Public Warning System standards, PWS - also known as CMAS in North America, EU-Alert in Europe, LAT-Alert in South America, Earthquake and Tsunami Warning System in Japan, each subscriber in that country either making use of the home network or its roaming automatically makes use of the embedded Public warning Cell Broadcast feature present in every Android and iOS mobile device.

In countries that have selected Cell Broadcast to transmit public warning messages, up to 99% of the handsets receive the cell broadcast message (reaching between 85 and 95% of the entire population as not all people have a mobile phone) within seconds after the government authorities have submitted the message; see as examples Emergency Mobile Alert (New Zealand), Wireless Emergency Alerts (USA) and NL-Alert (Netherlands).

== Public warning implementations ==
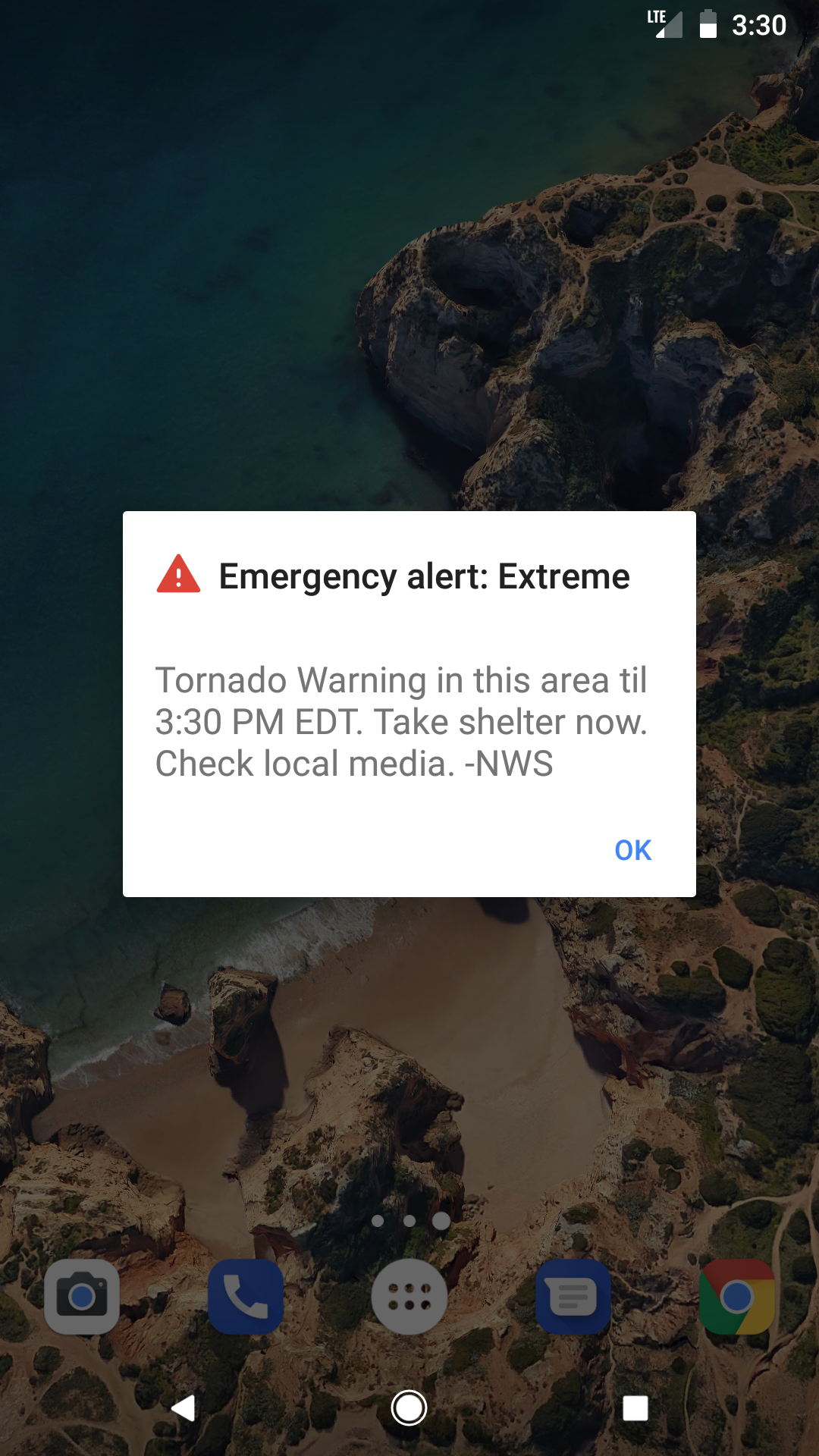
A Wireless Emergency Alert Cell Broadcast message on an Android smartphone, in the US.

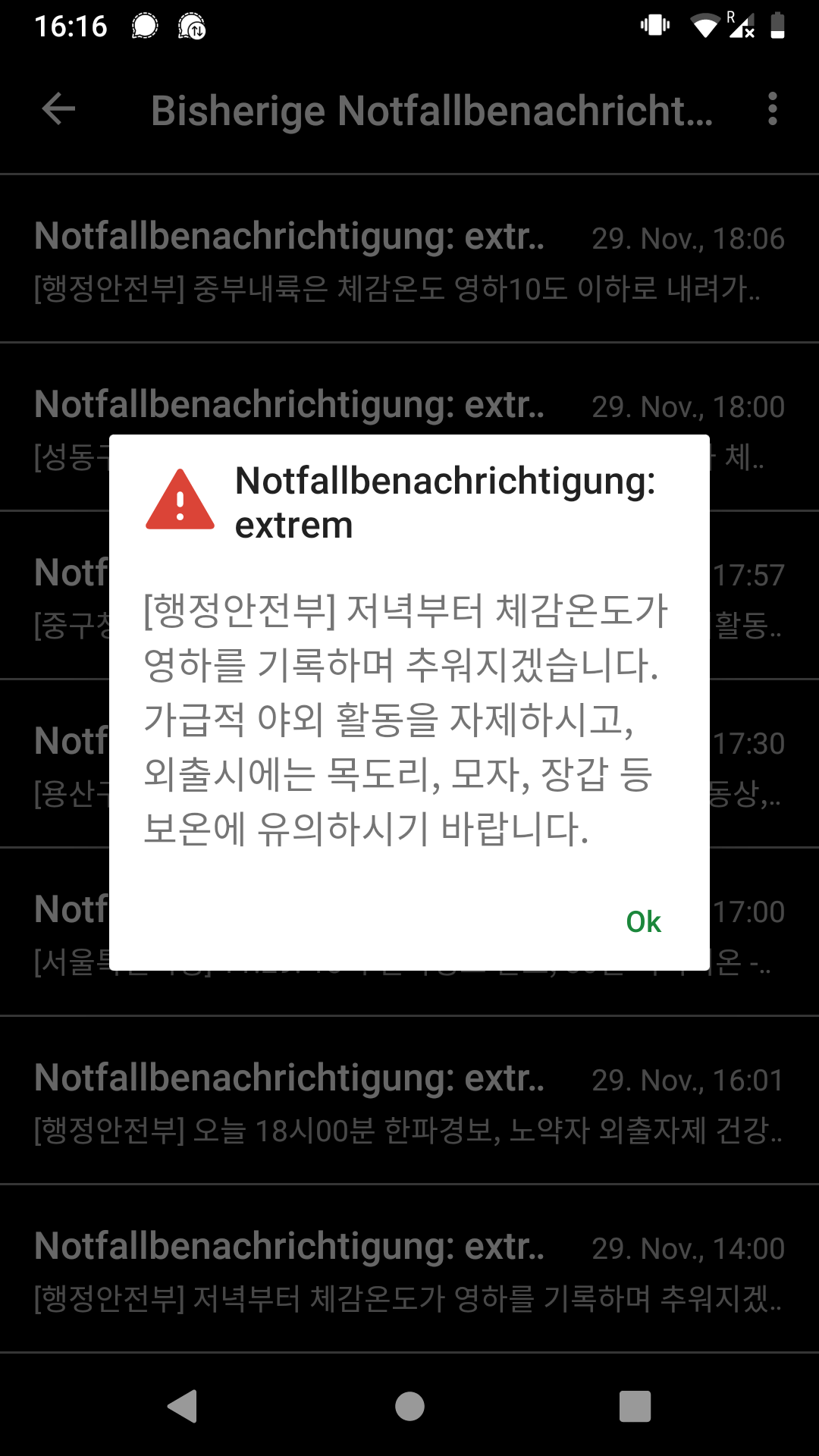
A Korean Public Alert System Cell Broadcast message, received in South Korea on an Android device.

Many countries and regions have implemented location-based alert systems based on cell broadcast. The alert messages to the population, already broadcast by various media, are relayed over the mobile network using cell broadcast.

- Austria - AT-Alert
- Brazil - Defesa Civil Alerta
- Bulgaria - BG-ALERT
- Canada - Alert Ready
- Chile - Sistema de Alerta de Emergencias (SAE)
- Croatia
- Denmark - S!RENEN (English: THE S!REN)
- European Union - EU-Alert
- France - FR-Alert
- Germany - DE-Alert (MoWaS)
- Greece - GR-Alert
- Hong Kong - emergency alert system (EAS) first used on 9 March 2022.
- Iran
- Israel - "Personal Message"
- Italy - IT-Alert
- Japan - J-Alert
- Latvia - LV-ALERT
- Lithuania - LT-Alert
- Luxembourg - LU-Alert
- Netherlands - NL-Alert
- New Zealand - Emergency Mobile Alert
- Norway - Nødvarsel
- Oman - Oman-Alert
- Philippines - Emergency Cell Broadcast System (ECBS)
- Romania - RO-ALERT
- Saudi Arabia - KSA-Alert
- Singapore - SG-Alert
- South Korea - Korean Public Alert Service (used daily for regional COVID numbers and additionally almost daily for example to inform about the temporary closure of a metro line, missing people or cold weather)
- Spain - ES-Alert
- Sri Lanka - Disaster and Emergency Warning Network (DEWN)
- Taiwan - Public Warning Cell Broadcast Service
- Thailand - T-Alert from Department of Disaster Prevention and Mitigation (DDPM)
- Turkey - UYARSİS
- United Arab Emirates - UAE-Alert
- United Kingdom - Emergency Alerts
- United States - Wireless Emergency Alerts

=== Countries in the process of implementation ===
The following countries and regions have selected Cell Broadcast to use for their national public warning system but are currently in the process of implementing.

- Australia - AusAlert (forthcoming Oct 2026)
- Brazil - Defesa Civil Alerta, already implemented at the South and Southeast regions.
- Czech Republic
- Finland - FI-Alert to be introduced in November 2026
- Honduras - currently being tested
- India - currently being tested
- Ireland
- Mexico - currently being tested
- Peru
- Portugal
- Poland
- Slovenia
- Sweden - SE Alert from 1 July 2026
- Switzerland
- Ukraine - currently being tested
- Estonia - upgrade to 5G based Cell Broadcast under development
- Malaysia - testing to start on 19 November 2026

== See also ==
- Reverse 911
