= Reverse 1-1-2 =

Public safety communications technology

Reverse 1-1-2 is a public safety communications technology used by public safety organizations throughout the world to communicate with groups of people in a defined geographic area. Reverse 1-1-2 allows authorities to rapidly warn those in danger, directly through their mobile phones.

== Technology ==
The system uses preferably cell broadcast technology to deliver predefined emergency messages. Examples of successful nationwide reverse-112 implementations can be found in Japan, Taiwan, South Korea, United States, Canada, United Arab Emirates, the Netherlands, Greece and New Zealand.

A possible alternative to cell broadcast is Location-Based SMS systems (LB-SMS). The location data accuracy of location based SMS is limited to the size of the mobile cell this is typically between 3 and 15 km (2 and 9 miles). LB-SMS needs to determine first the identities of the subscribers (cell phone numbers/MSISDNs) present in the target cell area(s) and in a second step it needs to send the SMS messages to all of the cell phones attached to specific cell towers. Location based SMS has been chosen to deliver public safety alerts in Sweden, Australia, Norway, Singapore and the Indian states of Odisha and Andhra Pradesh who have implemented multi-channel Early Warning Dissemination Systems (EWDS) as part of the National Cyclone Risk Mitigation Project.

== European Union ==
The European Electronic Communications Code (EECC) has agreed to support the deployment of a wireless emergency warning system whereby all people – locals and visitors alike – within a certain range of an incident receive a warning message.

The purpose of the new European Reverse 1-1-2 system, is to communicate information regarding potential hazards (man-made or natural) to EU citizens via their phones, through a geolocalised message-sending technology. This type of warning should allow citizens to evacuate or avoid a danger zone more quickly thereby reducing the chances of casualties.

== See also ==
- Cell Broadcast
- Early warning system
- Emergency communication system
- Emergency population warning broadcasting
- Reverse 911 (North America)
