= Emergency population warning =

Warning issued by authorities to the public en masse

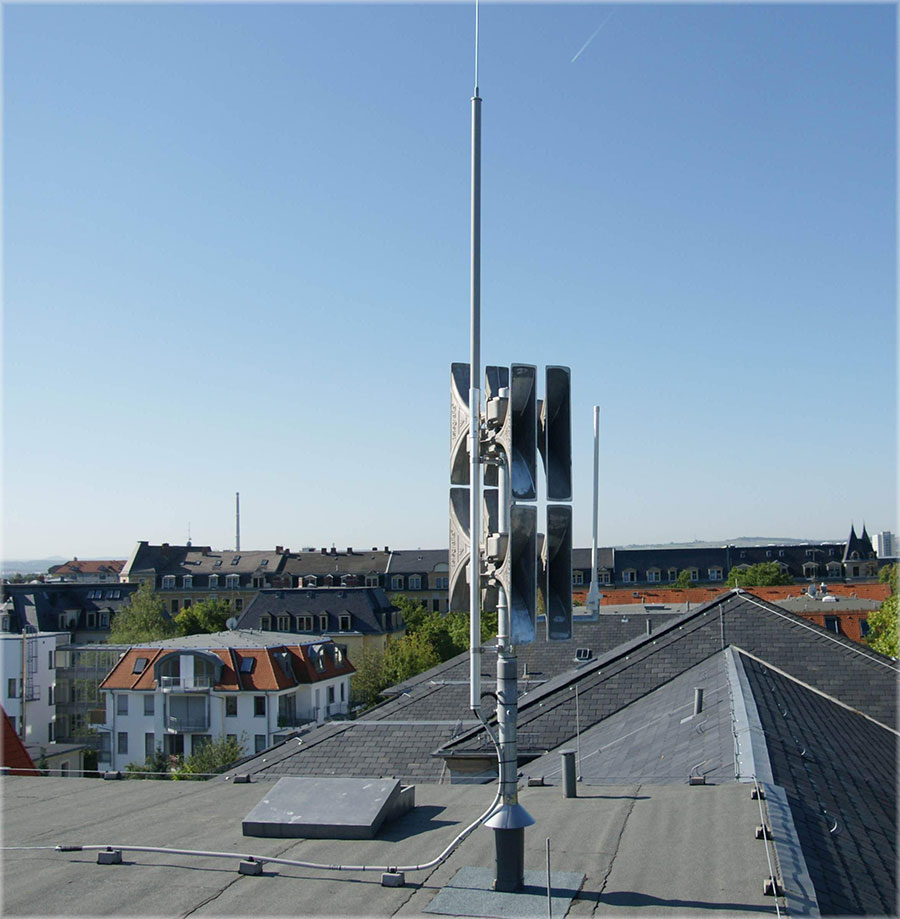
Public warning system siren in Dresden, Germany

Cell broadcast of Canadian Alerting Attention Signal

Cell broadcast of two-tone attention sound similar to that of Europe and elsewhere

An emergency population warning or public warning system is a method whereby local, regional, or national authorities can contact or notify members of the public to warn them of an impending emergency. These warnings may be necessary for a number of reasons, including:

- weather emergencies such as cyclones, flooding, tornadoes, avalanches and severe weather;
- geological disasters such as earthquakes, landslides, volcanic eruptions, and tsunamis;
- industrial disasters such as the release of toxic gas or contamination of river water;
- radiological disasters such as a nuclear plant disaster;
- medical emergencies such as an outbreak of a fast-moving infectious disease or pandemic;
- warfare such as air raids or acts of terrorism; and
- other events, such as prison escapes, abducted children or emergency telephone number outages.

Warnings are often disseminated during urgent events such as evacuations or where a severe threat to life is expected. Common alerting methods include sirens, radio, television, local media, telephone, SMS and Cell Broadcast.

== Requirements ==
In order to develop an effective emergency warning system, certain agreements or procedures are established, including:

- an agreement as to what constitutes an emergency in the area served by the system. This differs from region to region depending on the local climate, geology, and other factors.
- an agreement as to who can initiate an alert. In some countries all warnings are transmitted by a single command centre, while in other larger countries a host of local, regional, and national agencies can be authorized to initiate warnings.
- at least one system by which the information can be quickly transmitted to the population. This includes the method and technology used.
- an education program to teach the general public how to recognize an alert or what to do if a warning is broadcast.

== America region ==
=== Canada ===
On 11 June 2009, the Canadian Radio-television and Telecommunications Commission (CRTC) approved a proposal by Pelmorex, owners of The Weather Network and MétéoMédia, to receive must-carry status for the channels, in exchange for developing a "national aggregator and distributor" of localized emergency alert messages compliant with the Common Alerting Protocol. The alert system, known as Alert Ready, built on a backend known as the National Alert Aggregation and Dissemination system (NAAD), was first established in 2010, and further expanded as a result of consultation with government officials, broadcasters, and the CRTC. In August 2014, the CRTC ruled that all television stations, radio stations, and broadcast distribution undertakings had to begin mandatory carriage of local alerts relayed through NAAD by 31 March 2015.

The province of Alberta had its own system called the Emergency Public Warning System (EPWS). The EPWS was put into place after a major tornado swept through the city of Edmonton in 1987, killing 27 and causing millions of dollars in damage. Unlike the American EAS, however, broadcast of the EPWS was not mandatory on radio and television stations. It was broadcast on the CKUA Radio Network and was televised on CTV Two Alberta and other participating stations. EPWS warnings could be initiated by municipal police and fire departments, the provincial government, county authorities, tribal government agencies, Environment Canada, and the Royal Canadian Mounted Police. CKUA developed and maintained the EPWS until January 2010, when it lost a bid to modernize the system to an outside vendor (the contract had provided 15% of the station's overall budget).

In June 2011, an updated version of the system known as Alberta Emergency Alert was introduced, which emphasized multi-platform availability of alerts and advisories on digital platforms, such as online and through a mobile app. Participation in AEA is now considered mandatory under the CRTC's national public alerting mandate.

=== Chile ===
The SAE (Spanish: Sistema de Alerta de Emergencia; English: Emergency Alert System) was created as a response to the 2010 Chilean Earthquake after the failure by the national authorities to provide safety precautions and speedy information during the aftermath of the disaster. Since its inception in 2012 and through its official implementation in 2017 onwards, it has been used to provide alerts and information regarding natural disasters such as floods, wildfires, tsunami and earthquake warnings. All cell phones on sale in the country are required by law to be compatible with the SAE system since 2017.

=== South America ===
Many countries in South America have a mechanism called "cadena nacional" (Spanish: national broadcast). It enables the leader of the country to address the people simultaneously on all TV channels and radio stations, interrupting normal programming. In some countries, such as Argentina and Venezuela, the broadcast of these messages is obligatory. Many of these systems were created by past military governments, and political use of the mechanism is common.

=== United States ===
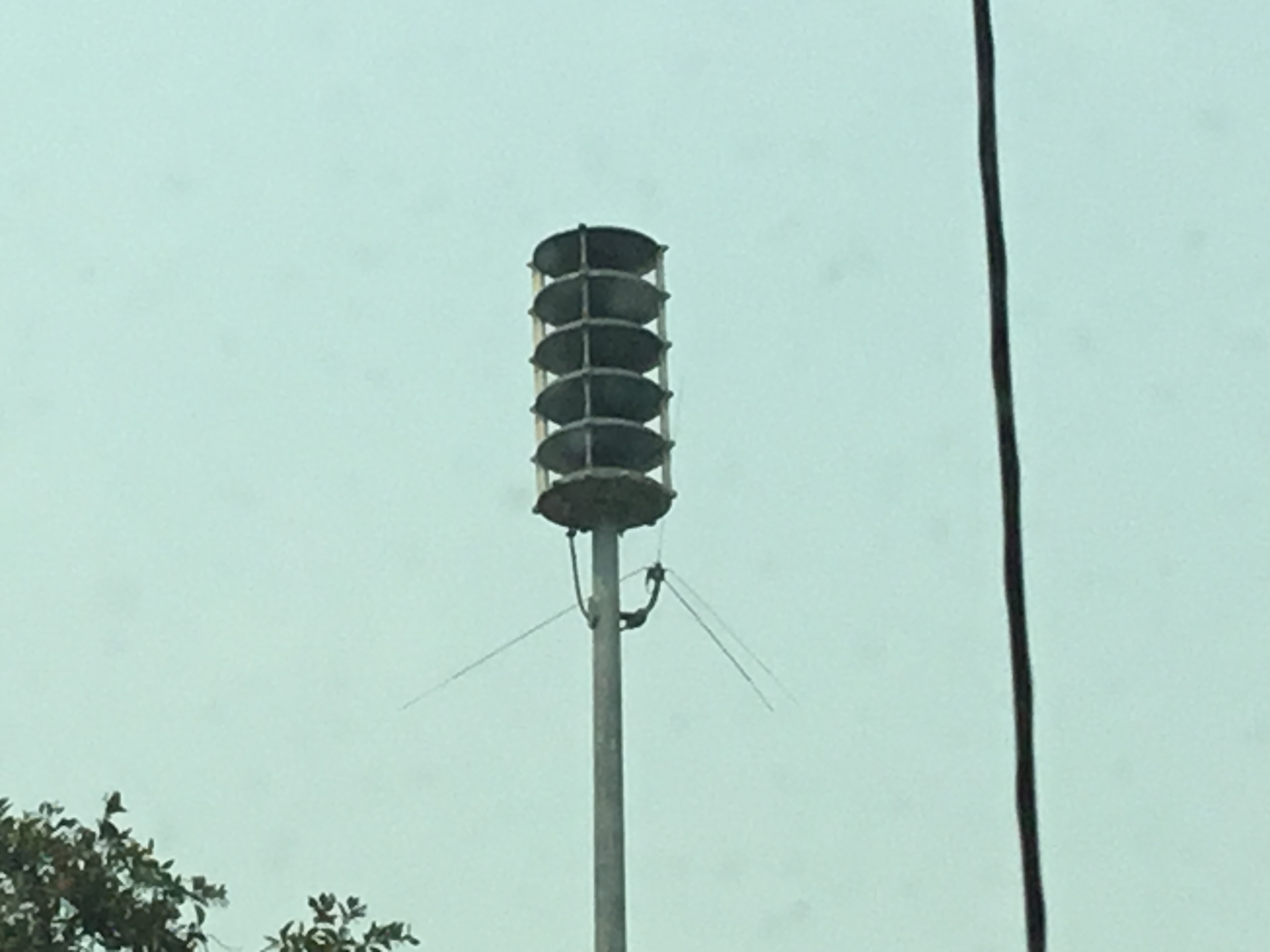
Electronic Whelen WPS-2750 Warning Siren in Milpitas, CA

The bulk of emergency warnings in the United States are sent through the Emergency Alert System, implemented in 1997. The EAS can be activated by national, state, regional, or local authorities, including police, fire, weather, and other governmental authorities. EAS is often activated when an unexpected emergency such as a tornado, earthquake, or release of toxic gas happens. The vast majority of EAS alerts are generated by the National Weather Service. There is also a National Volcano Early Warning and Monitoring System.

The Integrated Public Alert and Warning System (IPAWS) program of the US Federal Emergency Management Agency is an attempt to integrate multiple public warning technologies into a coordinated nationwide "system of systems" using the Common Alerting Protocol. Systems targeted for inclusion in IPAWS include the Emergency Alert System, the Commercial Mobile Alert System using cellular telephones and other wireless devices and the NOAA Weather Radio network.

Many states use existing air raid sirens to warn of tornadoes and flash floods. People living near certain nuclear facilities such as the Hanford Site in Washington have special radios in their home that are set to broadcast a warning signal in the event of a radiological emergency. Some emergencies, such as Amber alerts, are also sent out via e-mail, cellphone text message, and highway signs. Many U.S. institutions of higher education now use multiple warning technologies on their campuses, including outdoor and indoor sirens, public address systems, email and cell phone text messaging, and digital displays.

Prior to the adoption of the Emergency Alert System, the United States used CONELRAD from 1951 to 1963 and the Emergency Broadcast System from 1963 to 1997. Cable television systems in the United States also have emergency warnings at the time, known as Local Access Alert or Emergency Override System.

A notable example of an emergency alert being issued in the United States was a nationwide alert test, known as the National Periodic Test.

== Africa region ==
The United Nations' "Early Warning for All initiative" was seeking geo-located cell broadcasting and location-based SMSs by 2027. Several countries have cell broadcast systems.

=== Kenya ===
Kenya's Trilogy Emergency Relief Application (TERA) system commenced in 2015.

=== Mauritius ===
Mauritius developed a location-based system in 2023.

=== South Africa ===
South Africa operates a cell broadcast system. The country faces challenges of floods, bushfires, and earthquakes, separate to disaster data management by government agencies. It was first proposed in 2014, following Kenya's implementation.

=== Tanzania ===
In February 2025, Tanzania started developing their emergency communication infrastructure to include cell broadcast technology.

=== Tunisia ===
Tunisia developed an SMS-based system in 2023.

== Asia region ==
=== Iran ===
Iranian armed forces texts are sent on several occasions. Also texts are sent by US just as well.

=== Japan ===
Since 2013 the Emergency Warning System alerts people to the significant likelihood of catastrophes.

The J-Alert system launched in 2007 aims to allow government officials to address the population directly via loudspeakers. It aims to cover earthquake, tsunami, volcano, and military emergencies.

The Earthquake Early Warning system is operated by the Japan Meteorological Agency. It is capable of delivering warnings a few seconds before S-waves can propagate to distant locations. Warnings are broadcast by radio and television stations, and compatible equipment can automatically turn on when receiving a message. EEW capability is also required for all domestic cell phones sold after 2007.

JMA also issues advisories regarding tropical cyclones in the western Pacific Ocean.

=== Philippines ===
The emergency broadcast system for mobile devices was introduced in 2017.

== Europe region ==
=== Generally ===
Many countries utilise the EU-Alert standard for mobile devices.

=== France ===
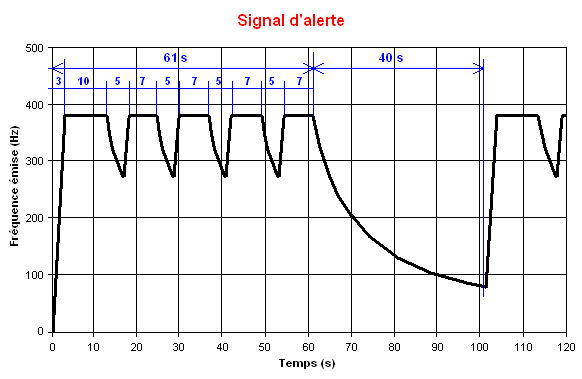
Alert signal in France

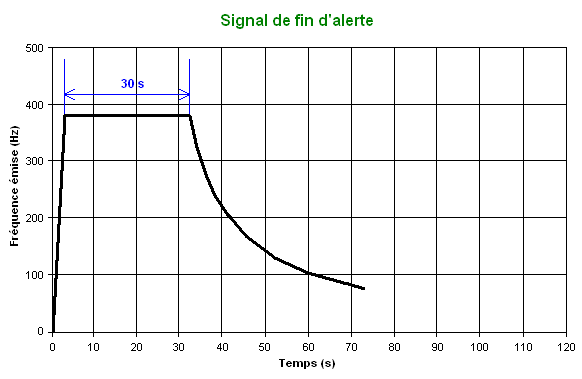
End of alert signal in France

In France, the population warning is made via air raid siren. This network is called the "Réseau national d'alerte" (RNA). The system is inherited from the air-raid siren network (défense passive) developed before World War II. It consists of about 4,500 electronic or electromechanical sirens placed all over France.

In some cases, the warning signal may be played by a mobile system installed on the fire department's vehicles.

The warning signal is described by décret (by law) of 23 March 2007. It consists in a modulated sound going up and down (up to 380 Hz) during the first minute, and repeated three times. The end of alert is a continuous signal lasting 30 seconds.

The system is tested the first Wednesday of every month at 11.45 in the north, 12.00 in the centre, and at 12.15 in the south; for tests, the modulated signal is played only once.

When the warning signal sounds, people are expected to remain at home or the building they are in and listen to further instructions on radio via France Info, France Inter, or local stations.

Instructions may also be announced by police or fire department vehicles.

FR-Alert

FR-Alert is a national-level mobile risk alert and emergency communication system implemented by Intersec in partnership with the Ministry of the Interior in France. This system is designed to facilitate the efficient dissemination of critical alerts and safety information to citizens throughout the country. FR-Alert serves as a platform for delivering timely and accurate notifications related to various potential risks, including natural disasters and industrial incidents.

=== Norway ===
The emergency broadcast system for mobile devices was introduced in 2023, and based on EU-Alert.

=== Sweden ===
The VMA (Swedish: Viktigt meddelande till allmänheten; English: Important public announcement) is the emergency warning system used to alert the public in case of accidents, serious events, or disruptions of important services. These warnings are broadcast through different channels:

- via radio and television.
- from krisinformation.se on either the website, app, or social media.
- as notifications in the Sveriges Radio app, SR Play.
- as text messages to your mobile phone.
- via outdoor warning signals.

These sources of information are however primarily broadcasting in Swedish, information in English may initially be limited. Non-Swedish speakers are directed to use translation tools to keep up with warnings and directions from the authorities.

In addition to these already existing avenues to broadcast Important public announcements the warning system SE-Alert is currently planned to start implementation by the summer of 2026. This system is going to use cell broadcast technology to simultaneously broadcast to all cellphones in the affected area of the cellular network.

=== United Kingdom ===
Between 1953 and 1992, the UK government had an alert system known as the "four-minute warning". Its purpose was to warn the population, through a combination of air-raid sirens and messages over television and radio, of an impending nuclear missile attack from the Soviet Union; its name derived from the expected amount of time between knowledge of the strike and the missile landing. The system was dismantled following the dissolution of the Soviet Union and the end of the Cold War.

In 2013, the government conducted trials of a public alert system using both SMS messaging and Cell Broadcast technology to send alert messages to mobile devices in areas affected by an emergency. A report was published in 2014 that said the trials were successful and that 85% of people thought that such a system would be a good idea, as well as detailing how such a system could be implemented, and plans for further trials. However, no further trials or implementation of the system came.

On 24 March 2020, the day after the UK went into a national lockdown in response to the COVID-19 pandemic, the government collaborated with the country's four main mobile networks, O2, EE, Vodafone and Three, to send a text message alert regarding the new restrictions to all registered mobile phone numbers across the UK. In order to not overwhelm the networks, the operators sent the messages in batches, going to one million or so numbers at a time. This process took over 24 hours, with some people not receiving the message until the following day. The government was accused of ignoring its own advice from the 2013 trials to set up a dedicated public alert system. In response, it began developing a system using Cell Broadcast technology.

In March 2021, a test flood alert was sent using the new technology to devices in Reading. Another generic test alert was sent to O2 customers on 11 May. Certain BT Mobile customers (with BT Mobile operating on the EE network) received two alerts on 20 May. A more public test of the system was carried out for devices in East Suffolk on 25 May, followed by a test across the UK on 12 June. Further limited tests were sent on 18 and 22 June. All of these test messages were sent specifically marked as operator test alerts, meaning that not all devices receive them. They are received by devices that have the option to receive test alerts turned on in the device settings, and some devices do not have this option.

The first test alert marked as an actual alert, meaning it will be received by all compatible devices in the given area, was sent on 29 June, again only to devices in Reading. Because this alert would be received by most mobile devices in the Reading area, this alert was given more publicity, with the Cabinet Office posting notices on social media, as well as some mobile networks. Further operator tests were carried out throughout July, August and September. The sound they use is exactly the same as the one in the US, some phones will beep three times before the message is read out, whilst other phones will signal a pattern for 10 seconds. There is no mention if alerts would be broadcast on TV or radio.

The government initially planned to make the system fully live and functional in the summer of 2021, but this was later changed to autumn of 2021, and then again delayed to early 2022 and then the summer 2022, with a publicised nationwide alert sent to all devices to demonstrate the system. A nationwide test of the system took place at 15:00 BST on 23 April 2023. Alerts were received by all mobile devices connected to 4G and 5G networks, running Android 11 or later or iOS 14.5 or later. Some older Android devices, as well as other makes and models of phones, also received the alerts. The alert was received by most mobile phones between 14:59 and 15:05 BST, however some mobile devices on the Three network did not receive the alert. A second test took place at 15:00 BST on 7 September 2025.

An alert was sent on 14 August 2026 at 19:05 BST, advising of a need for caution because of a general elevated risk of wildfires nationally – but not of any specific local threat.

== Oceania region ==
=== Australia ===
The Standard Emergency Warning Signal was originally adopted by the Bureau of Meteorology in the 1970s for tropical cyclone warnings. It became a standard national emergency warning signal in 1995. It can be broadcast on radio, television, automated telephone calls and in some places by public address systems in the event of bushfire, flood, cyclone, tsunami, earthquake or terrorist attack.

AusAlert is being introduced in 2026 for broadcasting to mobile devices.

=== New Zealand ===
Emergency Mobile Alert was introduced in 2017 for broadcasting to mobile devices.

== Organisations ==
=== European Union ===
EUwarn is an internal warning system used by the European Commission in Brussels and Luxembourg, as well as the Austrian Federal Ministry of the Interior broadcasting to mobile devices, introduced since 2011.

=== United Nations program ===
Early warning system is the term that the International Early Warning Programme coordinated by the United Nations uses for all systems that are used to send emergency population warnings. (IEWP 2007)

The United Nations Development Programme uses the Send Word Now Emergency Notification System to alert its worldwide staff when an urgent situation arises.

== See also ==
- Early warning system
- Emergency communication system
- Prediction of volcanic activity
- Warning system (list of types)
