= Alert Ready =

Emergency population warning system used in Canada

National Public Alerting System Alert Ready
- Alert Ready logo (English)
- Type: Emergency warning and notification system
- Branding: Alert Ready
- Country: Canada
- Launch date: 31 March 2015
- Transmitters: All terrestrial radio and television broadcasters and digital multichannel television providers
- Network: Common Alerting Protocol Wireless Emergency Alerts
- Official website: www.alertready.ca/
- Replaced: National Attack Warning Siren System

The National Public Alerting System (NPAS; French: Système national d'alertes à la population), branded as Alert Ready (French: En Alerte), is the national warning system in Canada, broadcast to Canadian television, radio, and wireless devices.

The system consists of infrastructure and standards for the presentation and distribution of public alerts issued by federal or provincial/territorial government authorities (particularly public safety authorities)—such as for weather emergencies, Amber alerts, and other emergency notifications—through all broadcasters and last-mile distributors in the affected region, including television stations, radio stations, television providers, and mobile networks in the affected region. The system is based upon the Common Alerting Protocol (CAP; called the Canadian Profile of the Common Alerting Protocol, CAP-CP), while wireless alerts (Wireless Public Alerting System) use a Canadian variant of the Wireless Emergency Alerts (WEA) standard adopted in the United States.

Alert Ready officially launched on 31 March 2015; it distributes alerts to broadcasters and other parties through its central technical infrastructure—called the National Alert Aggregation and Dissemination (NAAD) system—which was developed and is operated by Pelmorex Media—owner of The Weather Network. Pelmorex is also responsible for public awareness campaigns surrounding the system. By order of the Canadian Radio-television and Telecommunications Commission (CRTC), all terrestrial radio and television stations, digital multichannel television providers, and mobile network operators using LTE technology or newer, are required to participate in the NPAS.

Alert Ready has faced criticism, particularly due to wireless alerts being handled under a blanket category with no opt-outs on its smartphones running unmodified operating systems (as opposed to the severity-based system used by the U.S. WEA system), and criticism over Amber alerts (particularly in Ontario) being issued province-wide rather than geographically targeted to relevant regions. In April 2020, the RCMP faced criticism for not understanding and being slow to work with local officials in use of the system to warn of an active gunman, which had attacked multiple locations in the province of Nova Scotia.

Until 2026, Environment and Climate Change Canada also maintained Weatheradio Canada, which transmitted weather information and hazard alerts. Unlike Alert Ready, it utilized Specific Area Message Encoding (SAME)—the same protocol used by NOAA Weather Radio and the Emergency Alert System in the United States.

== History ==
=== Proposals ===
Various attempts had been made in the 20th and 21st centuries to establish a public alert system in Canada, by both departments of government and by television broadcasters.

In 1992, Alberta implemented a provincial emergency alert system known as the Emergency Public Warning System (EPWS); its development was spurred by an F4 tornado that had hit the Edmonton area on 31 July 1987, killing 27 people. The system was originally operated by the CKUA Radio Network under contract with the province.

Under the 1995 Federal Policy for Emergencies, Industry Canada led the effort for coordinating the provision of an emergency broadcasting service, based on the facilities and services of the Canadian Broadcasting Corporation (CBC), Environment Canada and, as necessary, privately owned networks and stations.

In 2001, Pelmorex, owners of The Weather Network and MétéoMédia, applied to the Canadian Radio-television and Telecommunications Commission (CRTC) for an amendment to their licenses to encompass a mandatory "All Channel Alert" system, requiring all television providers to relay emergency messages on behalf of governments across all of their channels. The service would have used proprietary hardware developed by Pelmorex, and would have been funded primarily by a 13 cent increase in carriage fees for the two channels. However, its initial proposal was denied by the CRTC, citing the need for consultation with broadcasters, television providers, and other parties on how the system would be designed, along with its costs. There were also concerns over the means in which the system was to be implemented technologically, and that the system was not inclusive to the visually impaired because Pelmorex only specified use of a text crawl, without an audio component.

Establishment of such a system in a voluntary form was hampered by CRTC rules at the time, which required television providers to obtain consent from broadcasters before they could overlay emergency notifications onto their programming. In 2005, CRTC called for proposals regarding a national alerting system; Pelmorex and the CBC submitted proposals for a national system, while Bell ExpressVu submitted a proposal requesting the removal of the consent requirement. The CBC's proposal would have fed alerts via satellite to decoders installed at local CBC Radio transmitters. It would have allowed television providers to participate on a voluntary basis by installing decoders of their own, if the aforementioned consent requirement were removed. All three applicants promised to adopt the standardized alerting specifications that were developed by the government-backed CANALERT initiative.

While broadcasters and governments supported the proposals for a national alerting system, CTV, Canwest Global and CHUM Limited showed concerns surrounding the Pelmorex proposal, as it would be operated by a for-profit venture that would have the power to override their signals with third-party content, and be redundant to alerts already provided as a public service by some broadcasters. Shaw and Rogers argued that the Pelmorex system was less cost-efficient than the CBC's proposal. It was also disputed whether the CRTC could even order the mandatory distribution of the service, as the CRTC does not regulate alphanumeric content because it is not considered television programming.

In 2007, the CRTC removed the consent requirement to ease the adoption of voluntary alerting by broadcast distribution undertakings, but stated that it would reconsider the possibility of a mandatory alert system in the future.

=== Development ===
In 2009, the CRTC approved a proposal by Pelmorex to grant an 9.1 (1)(h) order of must-carry status to The Weather Network and MétéoMédia on digital television services. As part of the proposal, Pelmorex committed to developing a "national aggregator and distributor" (NAAD) of localized emergency alert messages compliant with the Common Alerting Protocol. Pelmorex established a governance council for the system, including representatives of the broadcasting industry, federal government, members of the Senior Officials Responsible for Emergency Management (SOREM), and the Canadian Association for Public Alerting and Notification, to oversee its operations.

The NAAD System was officially launched in 2010, becoming the technical infrastructure for the NPAS initiative.

In a 2011 renewal of the must-carry status, the CRTC praised Pelmorex's work, considering the NAAD system to be "an essential element of a national public alerting system," and expressed an expectation for all broadcasters to voluntarily participate in distributing its alerts. However, as a condition of the renewal, the CRTC ordered Pelmorex to reach agreements with all federal, provincial and territorial emergency management officials to allow them to transmit messages through the system, implement the capability of processing "broadcast intrusive alerts" through the system, and develop a public awareness campaign surrounding the alert system with a budget of at least $1 million per-year. In June of the same year, Alberta replaced the EPWS with Alberta Emergency Alert, which distributes alerts on radio and television, as well as online and via social networking services.

Environment Canada, the Canadian Council of Emergency Management Organizations, and the provinces of Manitoba and New Brunswick endorsed the potential use of the NAAD framework as a backend for a mandatory public alerting system. On 26 May 2013, SOREM published a "Common Look and Feel" specification for alerts. Developed with guidance from the broadcasting industry, it describes how and when alerts are to be distributed and presented to the public. As part of a license renewal in May 2013, CBC Radio agreed to implement an alerting system using NAAD by 31 December 2014.

On 27 February 2014, the CRTC issued a proposal to mandate participation in the national alert system by all television and radio broadcasters, and cable and satellite companies. The commission felt that owing to the importance of the endeavour, broadcasters had displayed an inconsistent level of commitment to implement it voluntarily. This mandate was passed by the CRTC later that year through regulatory amendments.

The Wireless Public Alerting System (WPAS) initiative was also launched that year as a three-year pilot project led by Innovation, Science and Economic Development Canada, in collaboration with Defence Research Development Canada and Public Safety Canada, with the purpose to develop the use of LTE-based technology for emergency wireless public alerting.

=== Alert Ready ===
On 29 August 2014, the CRTC issued a regulatory order mandating that all Canadian broadcasters—including over-the-air television broadcasters, radio broadcasters, and broadcast distribution undertakings—begin participating in the National Public Alerting System by 31 March 2015. Community, campus, and aboriginal broadcasters were given an extended deadline of 31 March 2016 to implement the system.

In 2015, through television and radio, Pelmorex launched a public awareness and education campaign about the new emergency alerting service. This campaign was branded Alert Ready (French: En Alerte), launching on 31 March 2015. Alert Ready is now the public-facing brand name for the NPAS initiative.

Bell Satellite TV, MTS, Shaw Direct, and Sogetel did not fully participate in the system upon the deadline, as some of their customers utilized legacy set-top boxes that cannot be updated to support the display of public alerts. They were granted a six-month extension for the implementation deadline by the CRTC in order to address these issues, under the condition that they inform customers that they cannot receive public alerts unless they update their hardware, and were required to present bi-weekly progress reports to the CRTC. Chairman Jean-Pierre Blais criticized the providers for their inability to properly implement the system, stating that the commission "will not hide our disappointment that certain television service providers are not ready, despite having been given more than enough time [to implement it.]"

In December 2015, the CRTC granted an indefinite extension of the exceptions and reporting guidelines to Bell, Shaw Direct, and MTS until they completely phase out hardware that is not compatible with the NPAS. The CRTC felt that the providers had made a good-faith effort in informing customers of their inability to receive public alerts and offering hardware replacements. Bell reported that some customers had declined their offering of a free set-top box replacement as they did not want to participate in receiving alerts. MTS discontinued its legacy "Classic TV" service due to its inability to display alerts, and urged its remaining subscribers to migrate to its current "Ultimate TV" (now Bell MTS Fibe TV) platform.

Provincial tests began to improve public awareness of the new system, such as in Manitoba, and Quebec. One of the tests in the province on 19 May 2015, simulating a tornado emergency in the Centre-du-Québec region, surprised many people tuned in to radio or TV in the region, leading some to believe that there was an actual tornado emergency.

=== Launch of mobile alerting ===
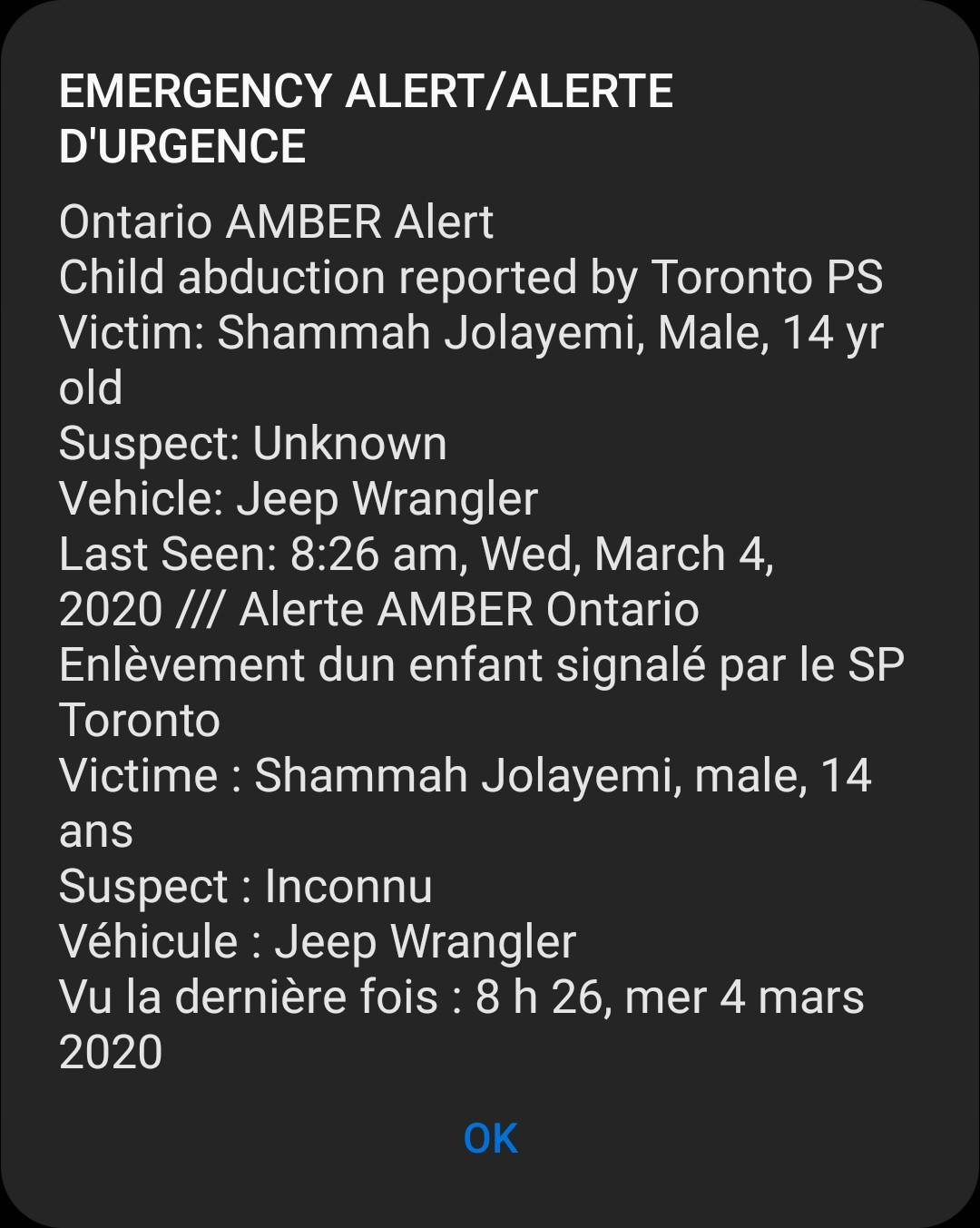
An example of a mobile Ontario Amber alert notice

On 6 April 2017, the CRTC required all wireless carriers in Canada to begin relaying public alerts over their LTE and post-LTE wireless networks by 6 April 2018, using Cell Broadcast-based standards by ATIS similar to the US Wireless Emergency Alerts system, collaborating with the SOREM Common Look and Feel guidelines. The CRTC required at least half of devices offered by wireless carriers to support wireless public alerts (including at least one device available at no-charge on-contract, and one "accessible" device) by the implementation date. As of April 2019, all devices sold by wireless carriers must support wireless public alerts. The mandate does not apply to networks older than LTE; the CRTC chose to exclude older network technologies (such as 3G) from the mandate, citing wide deployment of LTE networks across the country, and that government funding has been used to support its deployment in underserved areas.

On 29 January 2018, the CRTC informed the Standing Senate Committee on National Security and Defence of concerns surrounding the possibility of false positives (such as a false missile alert in Hawaii earlier that month), and ensuring that the industry meets its goal of at least 50% of devices being capable of receiving mobile alerts by that date.

=== Proposed federalization ===
In November 2025, the Canadian federal budget proposed that $55.4 million be provided to Public Safety Canada over the next four years to develop a new model for public alerting in Canada. The CRTC subsequently issued a request for comment on aspects of the system, including gaps in coverage due to cellular reception, and distribution of alerts in minority languages such as Indigenous languages.

== Operation ==
Alert Ready alerts are broadcast to last-mile distributors using the Anik F1R satellite over C-band on virtual channel 206 (with virtual channel 550 as a backup), and prior to 1 September 2019, using the Anik F2 satellite over Ku-band. The Ku-band signals were terminated 31 August 2019 after consultation with the Last Mile Distributors determined that it was underutilized and sufficient alternate services exist. Alerts are also distributed over the internet from web servers based in Oakville and Montreal on TCP port 8080. An RSS feed of past alerts is also available.

The presentation of alerts is dictated by the NPAS Common Look and Feel Guidance. Messages are formatted using the Canadian Profile of the Common Alerting Protocol (CAP-CP), and are provided in at least one of Canada's official languages (either English, French, or both, as determined by local policies and laws). Alerts can contain text and audio components, and contain information designating the region that an alert applies to.

Canadian Alerting Attention Signal

Messages marked with "Broadcast Immediately" flags are used to designate alerts that present "an imminent or unexpected threat to life, that alerting officials wish to be distributed and presented to the public as soon as possible, even if it means disrupting the programming of last mile distributors." On television and radio, relevant alerts marked with this flag are immediately presented to viewers when they are received, interrupting programming to facilitate their display. These alerts are prefaced by the Canadian Alerting Attention Signal. The attention signal is an 8-second sequence of alternating half-second duration complex tones, the first being a combination of tones at frequencies of 932.33 Hz, 1,046.5 Hz and 3,135.96 Hz, and the second at 440 Hz, 659.26 Hz and 3135.96 Hz (the same signal that was used by Alberta Emergency Alert). The attention signal is followed by the audio of the alert where applicable or supported by hardware (in the absence of audio, the alert may be read using a text to speech system, or a generic message played).

The Common Look and Feel Guidance prescribes that, on television, the text of alerts be displayed on either a crawler, or as a full screen notice that covers programming, in white text on a red background in both cases. Crawlers inserted by television channels are positioned at the centre of the screen out of respect for those inserted by broadcast distribution undertakings at the bottom of the screen. The guidelines note that "automated broadcast interruption need not be used if a person can present the text of an audience alert message verbally and visually mindful of the other guidance found in [the guidelines]."

=== Wireless alerting ===
In addition to television and radio, Alert Ready issues emergency alerts to cell phones and wireless devices that are compatible with the Wireless Public Alerting System (WPA). The WPA system uses a Canadian version of the Wireless Emergency Alerts (WEA) standard adopted in the United States.

A separate "Wireless Immediately" flag is used to require Cell Broadcast distribution. Wireless alerts on devices specifically supporting Cell Broadcast alerts utilize the same attention signal sound and a specific vibration pattern mimicking this sound. The Common Look and Feel Guidance specifies that the phone's software must display these alerts with a capitalized, bilingual heading reading "EMERGENCY ALERT / ALERTE D'URGENCE", and a limit of 600 characters due to device limitations. Devices may not be configured to allow users to opt out of alerts: they are coded using the same priority level as U.S. presidential alerts—the only U.S. category which may not be disabled. If the device's software is primarily designed for the U.S. implementation of WEA, it will typically identify Canadian wireless emergency alerts as a presidential alert.

Mobile apps are available that distribute alerts as push notifications to mobile devices such as smartphones.

=== Public awareness testing ===
Public awareness tests are held twice per-year, in which a 30-second test message (60 seconds in provinces where bilingual messages are issued) is distributed to radio and television outlets, and a Cell Broadcast message is sent to wireless phones. One is held on a Wednesday in May during Public Safety Canada's Emergency Preparedness Week, and the second is held in November.

Initially, five tests were scheduled annually, in May and quarterly on the third Wednesday of every third month of the year. After the introduction of wireless alerts in May 2018, however, SOREM quietly ceased all quarterly tests, citing concerns that tests only directed to broadcast media could cause confusion to the public over the effectiveness and correct operation of the extended system. The CRTC supported this position, officially requiring wireless service providers to participate in two public-visible alerts per year, distributed on all platforms.

There is precedent for alert tests to be postponed or cancelled on a regional basis if there is an ongoing threat of an actual emergency in an area, such as spring flooding in parts of Ontario and Quebec in May 2019. Contrarily in 2023, Alberta opted out of the national schedule, moving its first test up from May to 1 March 2023, to coincide with the designated start of wildfire season, and opted out of the nationwide test in November, considering it unnecessary due to the large volume of alerts that had been issued in the province since March due to tornadoes and wildfires.

The May 2024 test (8 May 2024) in most provinces and territories (excluding Manitoba, the Northwest Territories, Nova Scotia and Prince Edward Island) was, for the first time, issued by the federal government via Public Safety Canada rather than the individual provinces. Ontario was held over to the following week (15 May).

== Alert types ==
Federal and provincial/territorial government officials have developed a specific list of the types of alerts that are considered a "threat to life."

Type	Subtype	CAP-CP Event Code
Fire	Urban fire: a fire threatening multiple residential and/or commercial properties.	urbanFire
Fire	Industrial fire: a large fire in an industrial building or complex that poses a threat to human health.	industryFire
Fire	Wildfire: a fire involving natural combustibles, such as grass, brush, and trees	wildFire
Fire	Forest fire: a wildfire or prescribed fire that is burning in forested areas, grass, or alpine/tundra vegetation and poses a threat to human safety	forestFire
Natural	Tornado: a vortex of a violently rotating winds, often forming a funnel cloud that is capable of damaging property and injuring people	tornado
Natural	Flash flood: the sudden onset of water causing immediate flooding, often occurring from river ice jams and excessive unexpected rainfall.	flashFlood
Natural	Earthquake: a sudden release of energy in the Earth’s crust that creates seismic waves that can cause substantial damage.	earthquake
Natural	Hurricane: a violent storm involving intense winds and heavy rain, potentially causing a storm surge, floods, coastal erosion, or landslides.	hurricane
Natural	Tsunami: a gravitational sea wave produced by a large-scale, short-duration disturbance of the ocean floor.	tsunami
Natural	Thunderstorm: a storm of heavy rain accompanied by thunder and lightning that poses a threat to persons.	thunderstorm
Natural	Storm surge: an abnormal rise in sea level accompanying an intense storm or hurricane that poses a threat to coastal areas.	stormSurge
Natural	Landslide: a down slope movement under the force of gravity of masses of soil and rock material, which can threaten communities and infrastructure located in its path.	landslide
Natural	Dam overflow: an overflowing or failing of a dam or reservoir that threatens downstream areas. An alert is issued only in the case of imminent flooding.	damOverflow
Natural	Magnetic storm: a worldwide disturbance of the Earth's magnetic field that can disable electronic devices and infrastructure.	magnetStorm
Natural	Meteorite: a natural object of extraterrestrial origin (meteoroid) that passes through the atmosphere and hits the ground. May also be an asteroid.	meteor
Natural	Lahar: a flowing mixture of water-saturated rock debris that forms on the slopes of a volcano. Moving down slope under the force of gravity, lahar can threaten communities situated near the volcano.	lahar
Natural	Pyroclastic flow: a high density flow of solid volcanic fragments suspended in gas that flows down slope from a volcanic vent and can threaten communities situated near the volcano.	pyroclasFlow
Natural	Pyroclastic surge: a turbulent, low-density cloud of hot rock debris and gases that are ejected during a volcanic eruption that moves over the ground surface at a high speed.	pyroclaSurge
Natural	Volcanic ash: dust or particles emitted by a volcano during an eruption. Volcanic ash may remain suspended in the atmosphere for a long period of time.	volcanicAsh
Biological	Biological: a potentially dangerous and poisonous substance that is usually very unstable and can be easily transferred between living organisms.	biological
Biological	Chemical: a chemical substance that, if misused or released, could result in serious injury or death.	chemical
Biological	Radiological: a radiological substance with sufficient concentration.	radiological
Biological	Drinking water contamination: when water quality is negatively affected and a boil-water advisory may be raised.	drinkingWate
Hazardous	Explosive: a potentially dangerous substance or device that may explode.	explosive
Environmental	Air quality: a decrease in air quality is caused by an elevated particulate count in the atmosphere that can negatively affect visibility or the health of individuals.	airQuality
Environmental	Falling object: natural or human-made materials at risk of falling, posing a potential threat to people or property.	fallObject
Terrorist	Terrorist threat: the use of violence or threats of violence by individuals or groups against civilians or infrastructure.	terrorism
Civil	Civil emergency: an event in which humans cause a disruption of services or require varying levels of support, law enforcement, or attention.	civilEmerg
Civil	Animal danger: when a wild or domesticated animal poses a threat to human life or property.	animalDang
Civil	Amber alert: a notification issued by police services when a child has been abducted and it is believed that the child's life is in "grave danger."	amber
Civil	911 service: an alert that occurs when there is a disruption or outage of telecommunication services between the public and emergency responders.	911Service
Admin	Test message: a notification issued for either public awareness or technical testing purposes.	testMessage

Effective June 2021, broadcast intrusive alerts are now issued for severe thunderstorm warnings if winds exceed 130 km/h (81 miles per hour), or hail exceeds 7 centimetres (2.8 in). On 21 May 2022, a broadcast intrusive alert was issued for a derecho in Ontario and Quebec (identified as a severe thunderstorm warning) under these criteria for the first time. In August 2026, Environment and Climate Change Canada updated its system for weather alerts to use polygons, allowing for finer targeting of alerts to specific geographical areas than the previous system (which required that an alert target a forecast region).

=== Alerts issued ===
The following is the total number of emergency alert messages issued by Canadian government authorities through Alert Ready.

Alerts issued by province/territory, as of 31 December 2025
Province/Territory	2019		2020		2021		2022 (Note: Effective June 2021, alerts can now be issued for severe thunderstorms. The first alert for a severe thunderstorm was on 21 May 2022.)		2023		2024		2025 (Note: Current as of 31 December 2025)	
Province/Territory	# of messages	Alert type	# of messages	Alert type	# of messages	Alert type	# of messages	Alert type	# of messages	Alert type	# of messages	Alert type	# of messages	Alert type
Alberta	37	5 AMBER; 1 dangerous highway conditions; 1 overland flood; 11 tornado; 2 train accident; 17 wildfire	23	2 high water level; 2 overland flood; 18 tornado; 1 public health	22	1 police emergency; 10 wildfire; 2 public health; 9 tornado	117	2 civil emergency; 3 AMBER; 4 drinking water; 106 tornado; 2 wildfire	304	1 AMBER; 6 civil emergency; 1 Biological Hazard; 1 dangerous animal; 1 drinking water; 150 wildfire; 20 flash flood; 15 thunderstorm; 109 tornado	83	1 air quality; 4 civil emergency; 24 wildfire; 1 drinking water; 21 thunderstorm; 32 tornado	75	2 civil emergency; 45 wildfire; 2 drinking water; 1 AMBER alert; 12 thunderstorm; 12 tornado; 1 911 service
British Columbia	0		0		2	2 civil emergency	7	3 civil emergency; 2 wildfire; 2 AMBER	27	3 AMBER alert; 24 wildfire	16	6 wildfire; 5 flash flood; 4 earthquake; 1 AMBER alert	12	3 wildfire; 2 earthquake; 1 AMBER alert; 6 tornado
Manitoba	1	1 tornado	21	21 tornado	4	2 AMBER; 2 civil emergency	115	4 civil emergency: 1 AMBER; 8 thunderstorm; 102 tornado	197	2 civil emergency; 22 thunderstorm; 173 tornado	159	9 thunderstorm; 1 civil emergency; 149 tornado	102	3 civil emergency; 7 wildfire; 2 thunderstorm; 89 tornado; 1 silver alert
New Brunswick	1	1 tornado	0		12	2 AMBER; 10 civil emergency	7	1 AMBER; 6 tornado	13	2 civil emergency; 22 thunderstorm; 173 tornado	13	6 civil emergency; 6 tornado; 1 911 service	10	8 civil emergency; 1 AMBER alert; 1 911 service
Newfoundland and Labrador	0		3	2 civil emergency; 1 AMBER	1	1 civil emergency	1	1 civil emergency	4	3 civil emergency; 1 AMBER alert	3	1 civil emergency; 1 forest fire; 1 explosive hazard	3	3 civil emergency
Northwest Territories	0		2	2 flash flood	4	3 flash flood; 1 911 service	11	3 civil emergency; 8 flash flood	20	20 wildfire	2	2 wildfire	2	1 civil emergency; 1 wildfire
Nova Scotia	0		12	12 civil emergency	9	7 civil emergency; 2 drinking water	14	1 air quality; 10 civil emergency; 2 AMBER; 1 hurricane	57	15 civil emergency; 11 wildfire; 15 forest fire; 7 flash flood; 5 dam overflow; 2 911 service; 2 silver alert	18	8 civil emergency; 1 flash flood; 3 drinking water; 1 thunderstorm; 5 silver alert	27	15 civil emergency; 6 wildfire; 1 forest fire; 2 explosive hazard; 3 silver alert
Nunavut	0		1	1 civil emergency	0		0		0		9	9 civil emergency	20	20 civil emergency
Ontario	49	16 AMBER 33 tornado	82	10 civil emergency; 2 radiological hazard; 8 AMBER; 60 tornado; 2 wildfire	71	7 civil emergency; 6 AMBER; 58 tornado	175	3 AMBER; 8 civil emergency; 6 thunderstorm; 158 tornado	268	2 civil emergency; 2 AMBER alert; 17 thunderstorm; 246 tornado; 1 911 service	236	4 civil emergency; 4 AMBER alert; 228 tornado	236	8 civil emergency; 2 terrorism; 4 drinking water; 2 AMBER alert; 6 thunderstorm; 214 tornado
Prince Edward Island	0		2	2 AMBER	0		2	2 hurricane	4	1 civil emergency; 3 AMBER alert	2	2 civil emergency	2	2 civil emergency
Quebec	4	1 dam overflow 3 tornado	4	2 AMBER; 1 tornado; 1 civil emergency	14	2 civil emergency; 7 AMBER; 5 tornado	48	1 civil emergency; 1 dangerous animal; 1 AMBER; 1 hurricane; 34 thunderstorm; 10 tornado	101	4 civil emergency; 1 dam overflow; 3 forest fire; 3 AMBER alert; 4 thunderstorm; 85 tornado; 1 silver alert	50	2 civil emergency; 6 AMBER alert; 41 tornado; 1 silver alert	21	5 thunderstorm; 16 tornado
Saskatchewan	39	2 drinking water; 37 tornado	30	3 civil emergency; 25 tornado; 2 AMBER	32	5 civil emergency; 4 wildfire; 23 tornado	297	20 civil emergency; 3 AMBER; 1 drinking water; 5 thunderstorm; 268 tornado	82	5 civil emergency; 1 AMBER alert; 3 drinking water; 12 thunderstorm; 61 tornado	263	5 civil emergency; 1 drinking water; 17 thunderstorm; 240 tornado	401	6 civil emergency; 14 wildfire; 1 drinking water; 19 thunderstorm; 361 tornado
Yukon	0		0		2	2 civil emergency	0		9	7 wildfire; 2 flash flood	1	1 911 service	0	
Total	131		180		173		794		1086		855		911	

Alerts issued by type, as of 2 October 2022
Type	# of messages			
Type	2019	2020	2021	2022
AMBER	21	15	17	16
Civil emergency	0	29	38	52
Flood	1	4	3	8
Public health	0	1	2	0
Tornado	86	125	95	650
Wildfire	17	2	14	4
Thunderstorm	(Note: Alerts could not be issued for thunderstorms before June 2021)		0	53
Other	6	4	4	11
Total	131	180	173	794

== Participating agencies ==
Only authorized government agencies may issue alerts. Alerts distributed by NAAD originate from specially designated government agencies/ministries and provincial alerting agencies. Severe weather alerts are issued by the federal Environment and Climate Change Canada (ECCC), while all other emergency alert messages are issued by the respective provincial/territorial government organizations.

- Alberta – had a pre-existing alert system, Alberta Emergency Alert (AEA), which is also based on CAP, was voluntarily adopted by broadcasters serving the province prior to the federal alerting mandate, and has since been distributed through NAAD as well. Participation in AEA therefore became mandatory. Unlike other provinces, local authorities (such as law enforcement) have direct access to the platform without needing to operate through the Alberta Emergency Management Agency. In March 2023, AEA was decommissioned and migrated to the national NAAD infrastructure.
- British Columbia – BC Emergency Alerting System (under Emergency Management BC)
- Manitoba – Manitoba Emergency Measures Organization (under Manitoba Infrastructure)
- Newfoundland and Labrador – Emergency Services Division Department
- New Brunswick – New Brunswick Emergency Measures Organization (NBEMO; under the Department of Justice and Public Safety)
- Northwest Territories – Emergency Management Organization (under the Department of Municipal and Community Affairs)
- Nova Scotia – Emergency Management Office (under the Department of Municipal Affairs)
- Nunavut – Emergency Measures Organization (under Nunavut Emergency Management)
- Ontario – Emergency Management Ontario (under Ministry of the Solicitor General)
- Prince Edward Island – Prince Edward Island Emergency Measures Organization (under the Department of Justice and Public Safety)
- Québec – Québec En Alerte (under Ministry of Public Security)
- Saskatchewan – SaskAlert is the Saskatchewan government's emergency public alerting program. SaskAlert participants at the provincial level include the Saskatchewan Public Safety Agency, Ministry of Environment, Ministry of Health, Ministry of Social Services, Ministry of Highways, Ministry of Parks Culture and Sport, SaskPower, SaskTel, and Saskatchewan Water Security Agency.
- Yukon – Emergency Measures Organization (under the Department of Community Services)

As the system was designed primarily to handle domestic situations such as weather, ECCC was initially the only federal agency capable of issuing alerts. Following the false alarm in Hawaii in January 2018, discussions began on how the possibility of an actual missile attack threat would be handled, and the Canadian Press reported in December 2018 that they were "finalizing" a protocol for the handling of such events. As of 2024, the federal government may issue alerts for "information of national interest" within its jurisdiction.

== Reception ==
An activation of the system in Manitoba for a tornado spotting led to criticism over the quality of the text-to-speech system used by Manitoba's implementation of the alert system, with viewers reporting a "garbled" message and mispronunciations of community names.

Complaints were raised in British Columbia and surrounding provinces and territories on 11 May 2026, following the distribution of an Amber alert at 1AM. Individuals reported being frightened and woken up by the alerts loud and blaring alarm, with some dismissing the contents of the alert as they scrambled to silence their phones. Concerns were raised that the distribution of Amber alerts in the middle of the night would result in desensitization and would cause individuals to ignore alerts regarding emergencies such as natural disasters.

On 6 March 2016, Alert Ready was used to distribute an Amber alert in Ontario relating to an alleged kidnapping of a child in Orillia (the child's father was actually picking up the child after they had run from home). Viewers felt that the frequent notifications (especially as it occurred during the U.S. airing of the series finale of Downton Abbey, seen via PBS stations carried in Canada) with full-screen messages and alarm sounds as being disruptive, in comparison to the previous, voluntary practice of Canadian broadcasters displaying Amber alert messages on tickers. At the same time, the move was praised for providing a higher degree of prominence to the alert; Orillia Ontario Provincial Police commander Patrick Morris defended its use, stating that "while I will apologize for any inconvenience this may have caused, we won't apologize for using all of the tools available to us to find a missing child."

National Post columnist Matt Gurney provided similar praise, but noted that the system's operation hindered its ability to disseminate information quickly. He explained that while the purpose of such a system is to "[get] information to the public as rapidly and as clearly as possible", on his television provider's set-top box "the text was arriving on my screen incredibly slowly. Several minutes into the alert, we were just starting to get the description of the child and the suspect vehicle. It was embarrassing — when seconds count, the province needed minutes to deliver incredibly basic, utterly crucial facts about the emergency. The contrast between the urgently screeching buzz of the alarm and the text crawling up the screen in ultra-slow motion seemed designed for comedic effect." He also, similarly, noted the poor quality of the text-to-speech systems.

=== Wireless alerting ===
The first public awareness test to include Cell Broadcast transmission occurred in Ontario and Quebec on 7 May 2018, with the remaining provinces following suit on 9 May, in observance of Emergency Preparedness Week. In Quebec, a syntax error in the test message's XML file caused the wireless alert to fail, while users in Ontario reported mixed results. Testing in the remaining provinces and territories, excluding Nunavut, occurred 9 May 2018, again to mixed results, with people reporting having not gotten an alert despite their phones meeting the requirements. Though the test was reported to have worked in Nova Scotia and PEI, reports from Alberta, Manitoba, the Northwest Territories, Newfoundland and Labrador, and Saskatchewan saw people failing to get alerts (although the crown telecom SaskTel deemed it a success). Following the first test, Bell Mobility and Telus acknowledged issues preventing receipt of the messages.

In September 2018, Scott Shortliffe, chief consumer officer of the CRTC, acknowledged that the effectiveness of the system was being affected by technical problems, following a province-wide Amber alert in North Battleford, Saskatchewan where the wireless cell broadcast was delayed by several hours (as well as complaints by Manitoba residents over the cross-provincial extension of the alert), and mixed reports during tornadoes in the Ottawa-Gatineau region (including some users not receiving any message, and users in Quebec only receiving an English-language message). On 3 October 2018, CRTC Secretary General Claude Doucet issued a letter ordering service providers to participate in another visible all-channel alert test that was being scheduled in November (scheduled for 28 November). SOREM also requested that the CRTC mandate biannual tests of wireless alerts rather than just annual.

Criticism emerged following an Amber alert in Ontario on 14 May 2018 for a child allegedly kidnapped in Thunder Bay, Ontario—the first to have included mobile alerts. Three different emergency messages were sent, the first contained only English text, but was resent merely a half hour later in order to add a French-language translation, followed by one more alert message stating that the Amber alert had been cancelled, and the child found safe. Criticism was directed primarily towards the intrusive presentation of the message, and that all Amber alerts are sent across the entire province rather than regionalized to only cover a vicinity around the city (the alert was received as far as Toronto, which is at least 1,400 kilometres (870 miles) away from Thunder Bay), and the fact that all wireless alerts are mandatory and cannot be disabled (unlike in the U.S., where Amber alerts are one of three categories of alerts users may opt out from, while "Presidential" level alerts are mandatory and may not be disabled). There were concerns that such excessive use could result in alarm fatigue and desensitization to actual local emergencies.

In a 2019 follow-up to his previous criticisms of the system, Gurney noted that several instances of Amber alerts issued during the early-morning hours in Ontario had prompted residents to call 9-1-1 to complain. He argued that such alerts were only of immediate relevance to recipients that were awake, attentive, and "out-and-about" (who could be targeted via radio and television rather than cell broadcast), but were being given the same intrusive presentation as alerts for imminent threats to public safety that affect a larger population. Gurney thus argued that in such a situation, those who were not awake could learn the details of the alert in the morning instead. He also acknowledged similar opinions presented by Philip Cross in an editorial for its sister publication, the Financial Post; Cross felt that Amber alerts on phones should be optional as in the U.S., comparing the disruption of sleep caused by late-night alerts to health effects associated with daylight saving time, and noting that the public would be "more likely to arrive at better solutions if we can discuss the issue sanely, rather than have all complaints dismissed as callous disregard for children's safety." In response to an Ontario Amber alert that concluded with the victim found murdered, a Maclean's columnist, Scott Gilmore, pronounced all critics of the system to be "horrible" and expressing entitlement for their refusal to participate in the civic duty of locating a missing child in imminent danger.

In October 2019, a 70-year-old resident of Hamilton, Ontario was charged with mischief for disrupting emergency services, after repeatedly calling 9-1-1 to complain about an Amber alert broadcast.

On 26 November 2023, a notice of a boil-water advisory for Maple Creek, Saskatchewan was mistakenly issued as a broadcast alert for the entirety of the province. The town's economic development officer Gillian LaBoucane stated that the error was caused by a preset in the SaskAlert platform which specified that drinking water-related alerts be issued as a critical, broadcast alert, but that officials were unaware that this would cause the alert to be issued province-wide. LaBoucane jokingly told CTV News Regina, "Well it's one way to put us on the map."

=== False alarms ===
Text of the false alert:

This is a Province of Ontario emergency bulletin which applies to people within ten (10) kilometeres [sic] of the Pickering Nuclear Generating Station. An incident was reported at the Pickering Nuclear generating Station. There has been NO abnormal release of radioactivity from the station and emergency staff are responding to the situation. People near the Pickering Nuclear Generating Station DO NOT need to take any protective actions at this time. Remain tuned to your local media for further information and instructions.

On 12 January 2020 at 7:24 a.m. ET, an emergency alert was issued for the entire province of Ontario, advising that an incident had been reported at the Pickering Nuclear Generating Station. The alert stated that "there has been no abnormal release of radioactivity from the station", staff was responding to the situation, and that no immediate protective actions were required. Approximately 40 minutes later, Ontario Power Generation issued a statement on its Twitter account indicating that the alert had been sent in error. At around 9:10 a.m., a second emergency alert message was issued, containing a similar retraction. Solicitor General Sylvia Jones stated that the erroneous alert was the result of a mistake during a "routine training exercise" by Ontario's emergency operations centre.

In its aftermath, Dave Ryan and John Tory—the mayors of Pickering and Toronto, made calls for a full investigation into the incident. MPP and Ontario NDP energy and climate change critic Peter Tabuns also responded, stating that "confidence in the accuracy of the [alert] system is essential for public safety." U.S. media outlets drew comparisons between the incident and the 2018 Hawaii false missile alert (coincidentally, the Pickering incident occurred on the eve of the Hawaii incident's second anniversary).

On 27 February 2020, the results of a formal investigation were published. It found that the alert was triggered by a duty officer of Ontario's emergency operations centre at the beginning of his shift, who had accidentally remained logged into the live alert system when performing a regular internal test. It was considered common practice for officers to log into the live system first to ensure it is functioning before switching to a secondary, internal instance of the system designed specifically for testing purposes. The officer had realized his error, but the alert retracting the previous message was delayed due to an inability to receive clear instructions from Emergency Management Ontario supervisors on how to make an alert broadcast-intrusive, or whether the second alert should have been at all.

=== Testing errors ===
On 12 May 2021, Emergency Management BC accidentally re-issued a test alert that had been used for the biannual provincial test one week prior.

On 1 March 2023, an Alberta Emergency Alert test was accidentally issued a total of nine times, with seven issued at the originally scheduled time, and two more several minutes later. Officials initially stated that the duplicated alerts were the result of a technical glitch caused by the migration of AEA to the national infrastructure. On 15 March, it was stated that the incident was a glitch caused by "old code".

=== Non-usage ===
==== 2020 Nova Scotia armed offender ====
The Royal Canadian Mounted Police was criticized following a killing spree by Gabriel Wortman on 19 April 2020 in Nova Scotia, for not having used the alert system to warn of the active gunman at-large. Premier Stephen McNeil stated that he had not formally received any request for the issuance of an emergency alert, and explained that "I can tell you, I'm not going to second-guess why someone or the organization did what they did or didn't do at this moment in time. This was an active environment, I can tell you. Deaths, gunfire. Let's give them an opportunity as an organization to explain that to you." RCMP Chief Superintendent Chris Leather stated that they had primarily relied on Twitter to issue timely updates on the situation due to its fluidity. However, the areas where the shootings occurred had poor internet access, and a large population of seniors (who may not necessarily be active users of social media).

On 22 April Premier McNeil stated that at 10:15 a.m. AT, provincial emergency management officials had attempted to contact RCMP officials "a number of times" for permission and cooperation in issuing an alert. However, the RCMP did not respond; the suspect was shot and killed by police just over an hour later at 11:26 a.m.

The RCMP did not have a national strategy or policy for use of emergency alerts during such situations, but some law enforcement agencies began to express interest in evaluating future use of the system as part of their communications strategies. During a September 2022 manhunt in Saskatchewan for the perpetrators of a mass stabbing, the RCMP issued at least 12 emergency alerts in four days related to the manhunt and other unrelated incidents, which media outlets contrasted to the Nova Scotia killing spree.

==== 2021 British Columbia flooding ====
Emergency Management BC chose not to use the alert system during major floods in November 2021, with the province's Minister of Public Safety Mike Farnworth stating that "It is one tool. It is not a silver bullet." In response to the criticism and ahead of further storms expected to make landfall, on 28 November, Farnworth stated that the province would use the system "should a community or communities feel there is an imminent threat to life or public safety".

=== Coverage in remote areas ===
Due to cellular coverage limitations and other factors, the system has faced criticism for gaps in coverage, including remote rural areas and First Nations territories. In 2023, no NPAS alerts were received in Mistissini for a wildfire evacuation, requiring the James Bay Cree Communications Society to use its own outlets in cooperation with the Cree Nation Government to disseminate official information.

== See also ==
- Early warning system
- Emergency communication system
- Emergency Alert System
- AusAlert
- Weatheradio Canada
