= CANALERT =

CANALERT was one of the names for the Government of Canada's series of initiatives between 2003–2009 to develop an all-channel national public alerting system. Work began on CANALERT in 2003 with the First Canadian Public Alerting Forum and Workshop and continued with another forum in 2005. Industry Canada was the lead federal agency for this initiative and worked closely with provincial and territorial governments to define guidelines, procedures, and protocols, including a Canadian profile for the Common Alerting Protocol (CAP) standard for exchanging alert messaging across communications technologies.

In June 2009, Pelmorex was granted permission by the Canadian Radio-television and Telecommunications Commission (CRTC) to develop and maintain the National Alert Aggregration & Dissemination (NAAD) System, which later became the National Public Alerting System (later branded as Alert Ready), effectively putting an end to CANALERT and its successor project NPAS.

If it had become operational as intended, it would have been the first federal government operated national public alerting system in Canada since the demise of the National Attack Warning Siren System (NAWSS) in the late 1980s.

== See also ==
- Emergency Public Warning System
- Alert Ready
