= Alarm signal =

Alarm signal could refer to

- Alarm, a device that produces alarm signals
- Alarm signal (animal communication), a warning signal used by social animals
- Warning system, a system that produces alarm signals

== See also ==
- Alarm (disambiguation)
