= ¡Alarma! =

¡Alarma! may refer to:

- ¡Alarma! (album), an album by rock band Daniel Amos
- ¡Alarma! (magazine), a Mexican tabloid news magazine
- "Alarma!", a single by German DJ act 666

== See also ==
- Alarm (disambiguation)
