= Toronto Emergency Management =

Municipal government division in Toronto

- Headquarters: 703 Don Mills Rd, 6th Floor, Toronto, ON
- Executive Director: Joanna Beaven-Desjardins
- Annual Budget: $4.97 million (2024)
- Staff: Approx. 40
- Website: https://www.toronto.ca/community-people/public-safety-alerts/

Toronto Emergency Management logo (prior to 2024)

Toronto Emergency Management (TEM), formerly the Toronto Office of Emergency Management, is a municipal division and office of emergency management for the City of Toronto, responsible for coordinating emergency preparedness, response, and recovery efforts, ensures the city is prepared to handle natural disasters and public health emergencies, and is also responsible for the city's Emergency Plan and the Emergency Operations Centre.

== History ==
The evolution of emergency management in Toronto is reported to have begun as early as 1832, during the First Great Cholera Outbreak, where Toronto organized its first ambulance service, followed by police services in 1834. Following the devastating effects of Hurricane Hazel that same year, the Metropolitan Toronto Council approved creation of the new Civil Defense Organization in 1955, under the leadership of Toronto Mayor Leslie H. Saunders. In 1966, staff from the Toronto Emergency Measures Organization and the Toronto Department of Public Health transferred to form the new Department of Metropolitan Toronto Emergency Services.

In 1974, reductions in federal emergency measures funding results in the decline and eventual disbanding of the Metropolitan Toronto Emergency Services Department. Following the brief ownership of emergency measures planning by Toronto Police, the Metropolitan Toronto Emergency Planning Committee was formally established in 1979, followed by the first edition of the new Metropolitan Toronto Emergency Plan being published in 1980.

In 1998, following amalgamation, Works and Emergency Services Department established the Toronto Emergency Planning Office, which inherited ownership for emergency management planning and administration of the Toronto Emergency Planning Committee. In 2001, a new Emergency Operations Centre was established.

In 2010, the Toronto Office of Emergency Management was reorganized, moved out of Technical Services and has since reported directly to the Deputy City Manager under new directorship.

== Legislation ==
Toronto Emergency Management is governed by Chapter 59 of the Toronto Municipal Code, as well as Ontario's Emergency Management and Civil Protection Act (EMCPA). The EMCPA specifies that all municipalities in the province of Ontario shall "develop and implement an emergency management program and adopt it through by-law". An emergency management program must consist of:

- an emergency plan
- training programs and exercises for employees of municipalities and other persons with respect to the provision of required services and procedures to be followed in emergency response and recovery activities,
- public education on risks to public safety and on public preparedness for emergencies, and
- any other element required by standards for emergency management programs that may be developed by the Ontario government

The EMCPA further specifies requirements for assessing hazards and risks, training programs to ensure readiness, exercise requirements, and review of the emergency plan on an annual basis.

== Operations ==
=== Organization ===
Toronto Emergency Management is led by the executive director, who is responsible for overseeing the department's strategic initiatives, policy development, and operational preparedness. Directors and Managers then oversee the individual program areas staffed by Emergency Management Coordinators.

Toronto Emergency Management coordinates the City of Toronto's emergency response efforts in collaboration with emergency services such as the Toronto Police Service, Toronto Fire Services, and Toronto Paramedic Services, as well as other city divisions, agencies, and corporations. While routine incidents are managed independently by these organizations, larger-scale emergencies may require additional coordination and resources. In such cases, the city's Emergency Operations Centre (EOC) can be activated to provide centralized support and oversight. When necessary, the City may request mutual aid from neighboring municipalities under existing agreements or seek assistance from the provincial government for financial and physical resources to manage the emergency's impacts effectively.

Risk specific plans are established for disasters such as flooding, nuclear emergencies, and power disruptions.

== Notable incidents ==
=== 1962-2010 ===
- Air Canada Flight 621 - 1970
- Go Train TTC Bus Crash - 1975
- Mississauga train derailment - 1979
- Russell Hill subway accident - 1995
- CNE Royal Air Force plane crash - 1996
- Toronto icestorm - 1998
- Toronto snowstorm - 1999
- September 11th attacks - 2001
- 2002-2004 SARS outbreak - 2003
- Northeast blackout of 2003 - 2003
- Air France Flight 358 - 2005
- Toronto propane explosion - 2008

=== 2010-present ===
- 2010 G20 Toronto summit - 2010
- 2013 Toronto ice storm - 2013
- 2015 Pan American Games - 2015
- COVID-19 pandemic - 2020 (onward)
- Southern Ontario derecho - 2022

== See also ==
- Emergency Management Ontario
- Public Safety Canada
- CANALERT
