= Murders of Hanne Meketech, Terry Blanchette, and Hailey Blanchette =

2015 triple murder in Alberta, Canada

- Terry Blanchette, Hailey Blanchette (left), and Hanne Meketech (right) prior to their deaths
- Location: Coleman, Alberta, Canada; Crowsnest Pass, Alberta, Canada
- Date: September 9, 2015; 11 years ago September 14, 2015; 11 years ago
- Attack type: Murder, kidnapping, head injury, stabbing, cannibalism
- Weapons: Bat and knife
- Victims: Hanne Meketech; Terry Blanchette; Hailey Blanchette
- Perpetrator: Derek Saretzky

From September 9–14, 2015, Hanne Meketech, Terry Patrick Blanchette, and Hailey-Lynn Elizabeth Dennise Dunbar-Blanchette, a 69-year-old woman from Coleman, Alberta, Canada, a 27-year-old father, and a 2-year-old daughter from Crowsnest Pass, Alberta, Canada, were reported missing through an Amber Alert via the Alberta Emergency Alert system, prompting a large-scale search across the area. Meketech was found dead on September 9, and Terry and Hailey were found dead on September 14-15.

== Background ==
Hanne Meketech was born in 1945-1946 in Alberta, Canada, and she lived alone. Terry Patrick Blanchette was born on July 22, 1988 in Fernie, British Columbia, Canada, to Bill Blanchette and Faith Durban. Blanchette pursued a wide variety of interests, including watching sports, snowboarding, video games, and cooking. On December 31, 2012, Hailey-Lynn Elizabeth Dennise Dunbar-Blanchette was born to Terry Blanchette and Cheyenne Dunbar in Taber, Alberta.

== Incident ==
On September 9, 2015, Meketech was in her bedroom, and the killer suddenly came into the house, and killed her, using a knife and a bat. She was found that day.

On September 14, 2015, the killer broke into Blanchette's home, and killed him by striking his head with a crowbar and cutting his throat with a knife. Shortly afterwards, the individual found Hailey sleeping in a crib upstairs. He took her, and placed a pillow over her mouth to muffle any sounds that she made. The person took her to a remote acreage and choked Hailey with a shoelace, killing her due to lack of oxygen.

The killer dismembered her body and drank her blood, as well as engaging in cannibalism. The individual then threw the remaining pieces of her body into a bonfire, and left the scene.

Search

An Amber Alert was issued through the Alberta Emergency Alert system a few hours after their deaths, prompting police to treat the case as a high-risk missing-person investigation, carrying a very large search across the area. Terry's body was found in the house around 11 a.m. that day. On September 15, Hailey's remains were found in a rural area near the town.

Funeral

A funeral was held for Terry and Hailey Blanchette on October 9, 2015, at the Crowsnest Consolidated High School. A GoFundMe was established for donations of their memory.

== Arrests and charges ==
Derek James Saretzky, a former acquaintance of Blanchette, aged 24, was arrested shortly after the murders. Saretzky confessed that he was the person who killed them. On September 23, 2015, Saretzky was charged with first-degree murder, causing an indignity to Hailey's body, and first-degree murder in Meketech's death. In June of 2017, a seargent named Mike McCauley, spoke with Saretzky. Saretzky claimed he killed Blanchette because "the devil" said he was "a terrible father". Shannon Saretzky, Derek's sister-in-law, claimed Saretzky "really never was a bad guy".

In August 2017, he received a life-sentence in prison with parole ineligibility for 75 years. In June 2022, a woman related to two Alberta murder victims spoke out in the wake of a decision, transforming parole eligibility for many killers, changing Saretzky's parole ineligibility from 75 years to 25 years. On CTV News, Terry's sister and Hailey's aunt were disappointed in the decision.
