= The Weather Network =

Canadian cable television channel

- The Weather Network logo
- Country: Canada; United States; United Kingdom
- Broadcast area: National/Regional
- Headquarters: Mississauga, Ontario, Canada

Programming
- Picture format: HDTV 1080i (downscaled to 480i for the SDTV feed)

Ownership
- Owner: Pelmorex
- Sister channels: MétéoMédia

History
- Launched: September 1, 1988
- Former names: WeatherNow (1988–1989)

Links
- Website: www.theweathernetwork.com

The Weather Network (TWN) is a Canadian English-language discretionary weather information specialty channel available in Canada, the United States and the United Kingdom. It delivers weather information on television, digital platforms (responsive websites, mobile and tablet applications) and TV apps.

The company is owned by Pelmorex Media which is headquartered in Oakville, Ontario, Canada.

TWN was launched on September 1, 1988 as WeatherNow by Lavalin Inc. and Landmark Communications, the owner of The Weather Channel and renamed to its present name on May 1, 1989. With ownership changes over the years, Pelmorex acquired TWC's stake in 2015.

The network offers regional feeds for Alberta, Toronto, Atlantic Canada and British Columbia. It also operates counterpart brands including MétéoMédia; Canadian, Eltiempo Spain, Wetter Plus Germany, and Clima Latin America.

== History ==
The Weather Network was licensed by the Canadian Radio-television and Telecommunications Commission on December 1, 1987 and began broadcasting on September 1, 1988 (six years after the U.S. Weather Channel) as WeatherNow, under the ownership of engineering firm Lavalin Inc. (now known as SNC-Lavalin) and Landmark Communications. The channel gained its present name on May 1, 1989. In the early years, TWN, and its sister channel, MétéoMédia, shared a single television feed via analogue transponder on one of the Anik satellites, with computer-generated local forecasts airing on one while the video feed of a live forecaster or commercials aired on the other. At first the video section was only available during drive times on weekdays and half of the day on weekends; at other times local forecast was looped. The two services began to run separately starting in 1994, while both were still based in Montreal. Local forecasts were generated using the same systems owned by The Weather Channel in the U.S. called WeatherStar. TWN began using its own system called PMX in 1996, which is still in use today. Pelmorex purchased The Weather Network from SNC-Lavalin in 1993, two years after the merger of SNC and Lavalin. The channel launched its website in 1996.

Throughout the 1990s and early 2000s, The Weather Network broadcasts were divided into different programming blocks. One of the most notable was "EarthWatch", which originally began as a five-minute news segment discussing environmental and weather-related issues. The show had expanded as a nighttime programming block in the mid-1990s, and the news segment later spun off as the current "WeatherWatch" segment. Other programming blocks included the "Morning Report", focusing on Eastern Canada in the mornings; "Sea to Sea", focusing on Western Canada in the "workday" hours; an unnamed afternoon block which would later be known as "Across Canada" (spun off from a segment seen on "EarthWatch"); and the "Weekend Report", later known as "This Weekend". ("Morning Report" was, coincidentally, the title of the GTA broadcast dated back to February 7, 1994; the runtime was 4 hours. When it was upgraded to a national broadcast; "Good Morning Toronto" was provided as a replacement, but runtime was reduced by half-hour.) Programming blocks were discontinued in 2002 for weekdays and 2004 on weekends, although "This Weekend" continued to air until 2007.

On May 2, 1998, The Weather Network started broadcasting nationally from a new studio facility in Mississauga, Ontario after relocating from Montreal. This led to the departure of several presenters, notably those who were on air during weekends. Several new presenters arrived at the time, while many of the Montreal presenters initially relocated, most departed from the channel over time, many of whom moved back to Montreal. To date, Chris St. Clair is the only presenter from Montreal remaining.

The original logo, used from 1989 to 2011.

Late 2000 marked the beginning of a period of gradual, but significant changes with The Weather Network's programming, starting with the launch of a seven-day and short term precipitation forecast during the Local Forecast along with the introduction of new weather icon that is used currently. In 2002, The Weather Network introduced "Metacast Ultra", a weather presentation system that consisted of weather maps featuring more than 1,200 local communities, commuter routes and regional highways, animated weather icons, and higher resolution weather graphics. On March 29, 2004, The Weather Network introduced a new 14-day trend outlook as part of the local cable weather package. It provided a two-week look at how the weather would trend compared to normal temperature values and weather conditions for that time of year. In June 2004, The Weather Network took legal action against Star Choice (now Shaw Direct) after moving TWN on a new bundle without giving any notice to its subscribers. The channel's management tried to prevent Star Choice from moving the channel as subscribers would have to pay an additional $7 to watch The Weather Network. In late 2004, TWN made improved local forecast coverage, providing more localized forecasts in up to 1,200 communities across Canada.

The Weather Network relocated its headquarters to Oakville, Ontario in November 2005. The channel's GTA morning show made its debut at the brand new broadcast facility on November 29, 2005, while the network's national programming started broadcasting from the new facility on December 2, 2005. The Weather Network has gradually introduced new local weather products including an hourly forecast for the next 12 hours in 2006, long term precipitation forecasts in 2008 and improved satellite and radar maps in 2009.

In 2009, The Weather Network was granted 9(1)(h) must-carry status by the CRTC, under the condition that Pelmorex develop a "national aggregator and distributor" of localized emergency alert messages.

In early 2013, The Weather Network launched regional feeds, currently for Alberta and the Maritime provinces. Each feed features its own regional forecasts, weather stories, and where available, traffic information was provided by Beat the Traffic.

On December 8, 2014, The Weather Network and CBC News began a content-sharing partnership, in which TWN produced national weather forecasts that would appear on CBC News Network and during The National, and The Weather Network would be able to syndicate CBC News content on its television and digital outlets.

In 2015, Pelmorex bought out The Weather Channel's stake in the service.

== Programming ==
=== Studio/Live Programming ===
The Weather Network broadcasts in a news-wheel format, featuring various forecast or weather-related segments throughout the hour.

For some regions including the Greater Toronto Area, Alberta and the Maritime provinces, "Regional forecasts" are shown every half-hour, featuring forecasts and weather stories specifically for its respective region. For some areas, traffic reports are also presented during the morning and afternoon commute. For other regions "WeatherWATCH" provide a detailed analysis of the current weather across Canada, including the weather expected nationwide over the next three days. WeatherWATCH airs for three minutes just before the local/regional forecasts.

The remaining half-hour cycle features various weather stories from across the country and around the world. In addition, TWN airs a variety of smaller segments including:

- Force of Nature - (Featured every 10 minutes on the 3's, a show-reel of significant weather making headlines around the world).
- Flu, Cold and Covid Reports
- Weather Watch
- Storm Centre
- Science Behind the Weather
- Regional
- Climate
- Beyond The forecast
- Local Forecast - Radar update and major cities' forecasts for seven days ahead.
- Storm-Hunters - Weekends at 7 and 10pm.
- Captured
- Share Your Weather
- Must See
- Weather and Your Health
- The Travellers Report - Today's outlook for major cities in Canada, the United States and the Caribbean.

The Weather Network the news department won the first annual Adrienne Clarkson Diversity Award for network television. This award is given by the Radio and Television News Director's Association (R-T-N-D-A) for the best news reports on a subject of cultural diversity. The Weather Network then won for its 2006 two-part news series on weather and black history. The Weather Network also won a World Medal from the NY Festivals International TV Broadcasting Awards for a 2007 story on a blind woman learning to sail who uses her other senses to determine changes in wind patterns and potential storms. It won the same award again in 2008 for a story on a man and his seeing-eye dog trying to adapt to a harsh New Brunswick winter.

== Other services ==
=== The Weather Network HD ===
The Weather Network HD logo

The Weather Network HD is the 1080i high definition simulcast of The Weather Network that launched on May 30, 2011. It is currently available on Cogeco, EastLink, Bell MTS, Rogers Cable, Telus Optik TV, and Shaw Cable. The HD simulcast for cable and IPTV providers currently do not offer local forecasts unlike the standard definition feed. On August 22, 2017, the HD feed debuted on Shaw Direct.

At first, the channel's design featured a carousel consists of current temperatures, 18-hour and 3-day forecasts (including expected temperatures, conditions and precipitation possibility) for key cities within the viewer's region. Throughout the local forecast segments, an additional L-shaped banner was introduced, with the top two-thirds of the ticker displays similar information (for two cities at a time instead of one), while the bottom of the ticker promotes upcoming segments in the programming cycle. At the start of 2014 spring programming cycle, "14 day trends" were introduced to the latter, whilst the former showcased information from 50 major Canadian cities. The L-shaped banner was expanded to be used at all times. Special weather statements are shown on a crawl that appears above the bottom of the ticker, when active.

In 2017, the HD feed underwent another change in on-screen design, now featuring DIN Next as the principal typeface. This typeface has been dominant in the SD feed since roughly the mid-2010s. The top two-thirds now features three "boxes", with the first one showing the city as a header, and contains the current local time, date and weather conditions. The second one cycles through extra information on ceiling, pressure, humidity, apparent temperature, wind, gusts and visibility. The final "box" contains 18-hour forecasts for the city. The bottom of the ticker now alternates between national weather headlines and information of upcoming programming, which could be overridden at anytime by special weather statements on a bottom-up scrolling text format.

=== Satellite ===
In 2006, Bell Satellite TV and The Weather Network started an interactive version of The Weather Network, enabling viewers to set their city and view specific forecasts every time. These services are no longer available as of August 1, 2021.

=== Web & mobile services ===
In 2010, The Weather Network launched the WeatherEye application for mobile and PC devices. The mobile version is currently available for iPhone and Android smartphones, and uses the main channel branding.

In November 2015, an app-only version of the TV channel was launched on Android TV (using Live Channels) and Apple TV. It has a similar news-wheel, albeit with some changes, and overlays the local forecast at the bottom dynamically using GPS. It also includes on-demand video and local maps.

== PMX ==
PMX is the proprietary technology developed by Pelmorex to generate localized weather information on The Weather Network. PMX consists of computers, typically installed at a cable headend, that takes data fed to it (the video feed of The Weather Network, forecast information, and triggers to run said forecasts) and packages it for broadcast. Unlike the Weather Star systems, PMX units do not generate full graphical or video segments on their own, rather the information is super-imposed over the main video feed. There have been 4 different PMX units used: PMX-1500, PMX-3200, PMX-NG and PMX-XD.

PMX was originally developed by Pelmorex in 1995 as a standard localization system that would replace all of the previous WeatherStar 4000 units. The PMX technology quickly rolled out starting in 1996, with all communities receiving the new units by 1998. As of 2002, PMX generates local weather information to over 1200 communities across Canada.

== Notable on-air presenters ==
=== Former presenters ===
- Tim Bolen
- Carla Collins
- Martine Gaillard
- Ross Hull
- Carolyn Jarvis
- Patty Kim
- Elissa Lansdell
- Marcia MacMillan
- Waubgeshig Rice
- Chris St. Clair
- Scott Simms
- Robin Ward
- Kevin Yarde

== See also ==
- MétéoMédia, French version of The Weather Network.
