= Mitre Peak (disambiguation) =

Mitre Peak (1692 m) is a mountain in New Zealand's Fiordland.

It can also refer to:

- Mitre Peak (Canterbury) (2621 m)
- Mitre Peak, Pakistan (6010 m)

== See also ==
- Mitre (New Zealand) (1571 m)
