= Natyf TV =

Canadian television specialty channel

- Country: Canada
- Broadcast area: Quebec
- Headquarters: 4824 Côte-des-Neiges, Montreal, Quebec

Ownership
- Owner: Melkisedek Media

History
- Launched: June 14, 2018
- Founder: Jean-Yves Roux
- Former names: CNV TV (2018-19)

Links
- Website: www.natyf.com

Natyf TV is a Canadian television channel, which broadcasts multicultural programming for ethnic minority and racialized communities in Quebec.

== History ==
Jean-Yves Roux was first granted a CRTC licence in 2012 to launch CNV (Channel New Victory) as an English-language Category B service that would broadcast religious and multicultural programming. The English version of the channel never launched due to various business complications; in 2017, it applied to the CRTC to have its original license revoked, and to continue operations under the CRTC's provisions for small services with limited subscriber bases to be exempt from full licensing.

The channel finally launched in June 2018 as a French-language discretionary service on Bell Fibe under the CNV name, and rebranded to Natyf TV in 2019.

In 2022 the channel applied for a new full CRTC license, with a must-carry order to ensure that it would be available across Quebec. Its application received a letter of support from MP Greg Fergus, which was found to violate parliamentary conflict of interest guidelines as MPs are not permitted to influence administrative tribunals such as the CRTC; parliamentary ethics commissioner Mario Dion ultimately ruled that the violation was an accidental oversight rather than a deliberate attempt to wield political influence, but strongly recommended that all MPs should undergo refresher training on conflict of interest rules.

The application was approved in August 2023.

== Programming ==
The channel currently broadcasts French-language programming targeted to minority ethnic communities in Quebec, focusing in particular on themes of culture, fashion, health and wellness, the arts and education.

The channel's most noted program is Le Keke Show, a talk show on Black Canadian issues hosted by Kevin Calixte. Other programming includes shows devoted to gospel and hip hop music; a magazine show on Latin American culture; a cooking show devoted to international cuisine; and multicultural films.

The channel has not yet launched any original scripted fiction series, although it currently rebroadcasts the 2000s comedy series Pure laine, which starred Macha Limonchik and Didier Lucien as a mixed-race couple.
