= Warning system =

System to inform of a future danger

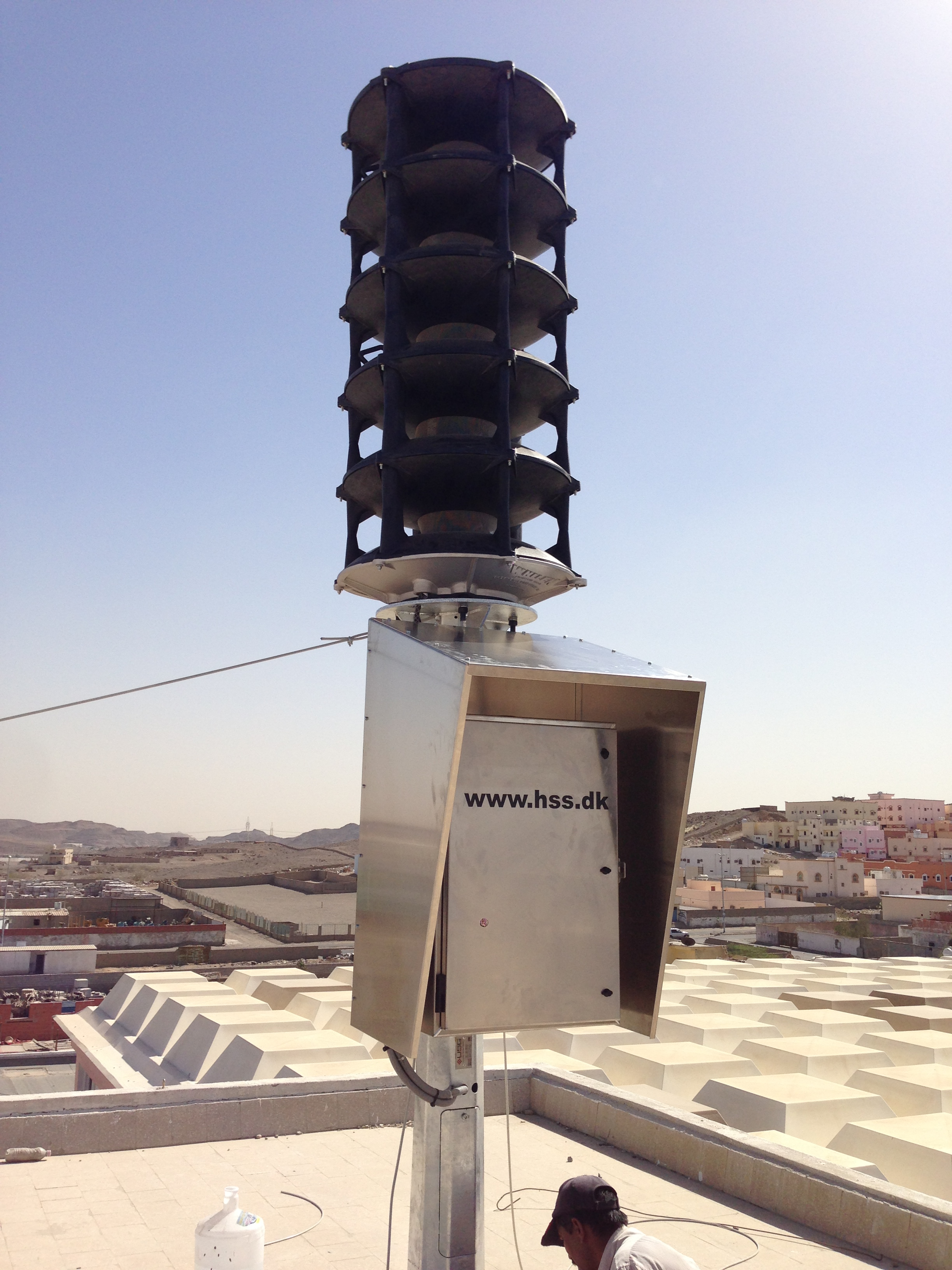
A HSS Engineering TWS 295 electronic sirens warning Civil Defense siren.

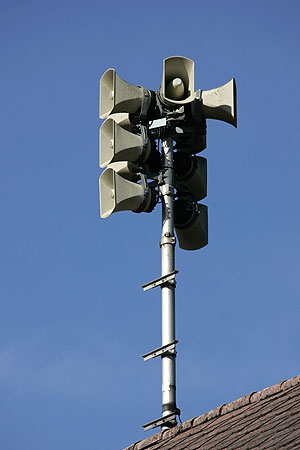
There are 8,200 alarm sirens for civil protection throughout Switzerland. They are tested once a year, on the first Wednesday in February. Sound sample

Warning light indicating danger of laser exposure

A warning system is any system of biological or technical nature deployed by an individual or group to inform of a future danger. Its purpose is to enable the deployer of the warning system to prepare for the danger and act accordingly to mitigate or avoid it.

Warnings cannot be effective unless people react to them. People are more likely to ignore a system that regularly produces false warnings (the cry-wolf effect), but reducing the number of false warnings generally also increases the risk of not giving a warning when it is needed. Some warnings are non-specific: for instance, the probability of an earthquake of a certain magnitude in a certain area over the next decade. Such warnings cannot be used to guide short-term precautions such as evacuation. Opportunities to take long-term precautions, such as better building codes and disaster preparedness, may be ignored.

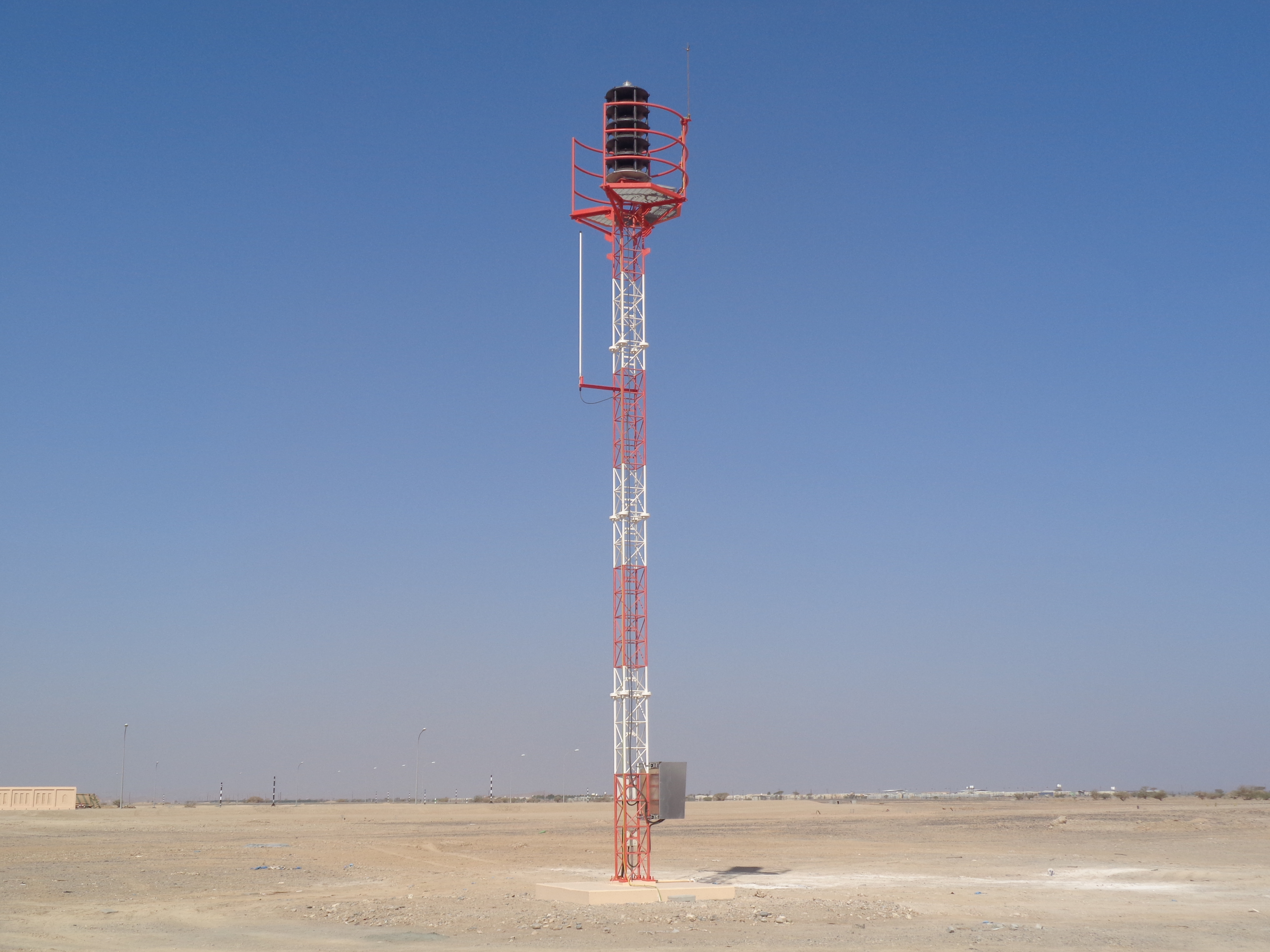
Early warning siren for earthquakes and floods

== Biological warning systems ==
- Aposematism (e.g. warning coloration)
- Climate canary
- Fear
- Miner's canary
- Pain

== Man-made warning systems ==
- Emergency population warning

=== Civilian warning systems ===
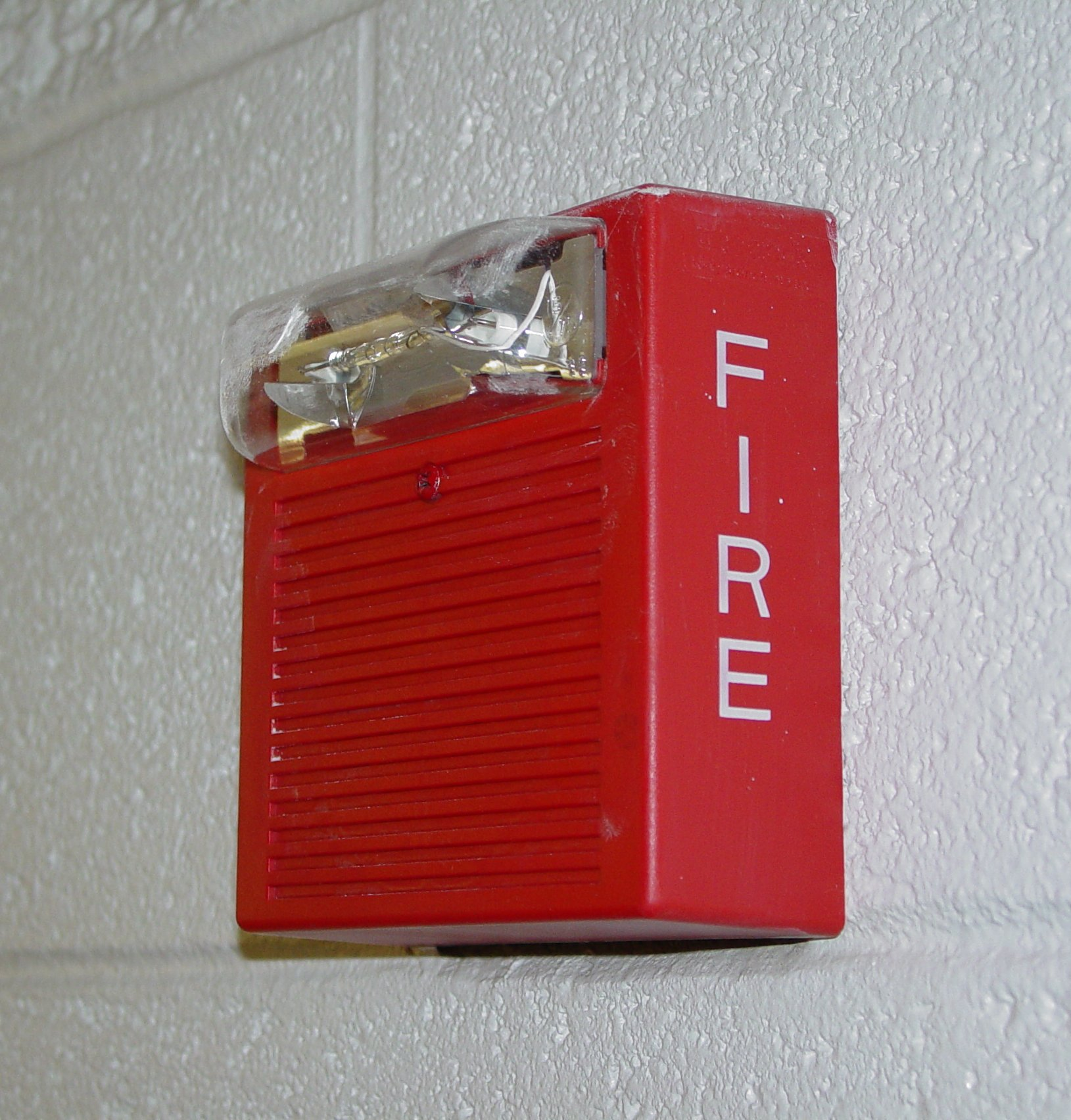
A fire alarm that warns people if a building is on fire

- Alberta Emergency Alert
- Alberta Emergency Public Warning System (replaced by Alberta Emergency Alert)
- Alert Ready (Canada)
- Automatic Warning System
- Child abduction alert system
- Dam safety system
- Earthquake warning system
- Emergency Alert System (EAS) (United States)
- Famine Early Warning Systems Network
- Federal Civil Defense Authority
- Fire alarm system
- Gale warning
- Ground proximity warning system
- Indian Ocean Tsunami Warning System
- International Early Warning Programme
- J-Alert (Japan)
- Lane departure warning system
- National Severe Weather Warning Service
- N.E.A.R. (National Emergency Alarm Repeater)
- North Warning System
- Standard Emergency Warning Signal (Australia)
- Traffic Collision Avoidance System
- Train Protection & Warning System
- Tsunami warning system

=== Military warning systems ===
Historical beacon-based systems:

- Byzantine beacon system in Asia Minor during the 9th century

Space-based missile early warning systems:

- Defense Support Program (United States, to be succeeded by the "Space-Based Infrared System")
- Space-Based Infrared System (SBIRS) (United States)
- Oko, also known as "SPRN" (Russia)

Airborne early warning systems:

- Airborne Early Warning and Control ("AWACS" for NATO, many countries have developed their own AEW&C systems)

Ground-based early warning radar systems:

- Ballistic Missile Early Warning System and PAVE PAWS (United States)
- Duga radar, also known as the "Russian Woodpecker" (Russia)
- Dnestr radar (1st generation Russian)
- Daryal radar (2nd generation Russian)
- Voronezh radar (3rd and current generation Russian)
- Chain Home (British, now defunct)
- Chain Home Low (British, now defunct)
- ROTOR (British, now defunct)

Optical sensors:

- Bomb Alarm System

Emergency broadcasting:

- CONELRAD (United States, succeeded by the Emergency Broadcast System)
- Emergency Broadcast System (EBS) (United States, succeeded by the Emergency Alert System)

== See also ==
- Alarm (disambiguation)
