= Chris St. Clair =

Chris St. Clair (born c. 1960) is a Canadian weather presenter and author who, until his retirement, was the host of Saturday and Sunday morning and early afternoon broadcasts on The Weather Network. As he has said on the show, he grew up in Halifax. For The Weather Network, St. Clair also hosted WeatherWise, a segment where he explained different weather phenomena. St. Clair attended Acadia University, and is a former commercial airline pilot. St. Clair also appeared on the January 25, 2011 episode of the Rick Mercer Report on CBC Television.

St. Clair retired from The Weather Network on Saturday, July 25, 2021, after 26 years. He was the station's longest-serving host, having joined the station in 1995.

== Books ==
St. Clair has written two books. Canada’s Weather: The Climate that Shapes a Nation was published by Firefly Books in 2009.

Weather Permitting, Twenty-Five Years Of Ice Storms, Hurricanes, Wildfires & Extreme Climate Change In Canada was published by Simon & Schuster on November 8, 2022.
