= Alarm (disambiguation) =

An alarm is a device that gives an audible or visual warning of a problem or condition.

Alarm may also refer to:

== Technology ==
- Alarm clock, a clock that wakes people
- ALARM, a British anti-radiation missile
- Arch Linux ARM, an operating system

== Arts, entertainment, and media ==
=== Films ===
- The Alarm (film), a 1914 American comedy
- Alarm (1938 film), a Danish family film
- Alarm (1941 film), a German crime film
- Alarm (2008 film), an Irish thriller

=== Music ===
- The Alarm, a Welsh alt rock band (formed 1981)
  - The Alarm (EP), their 1983 release
- "Alarm" (Anne-Marie song), 2016
- "Alarm" (Namie Amuro song), 2004

=== Other media ===
- The Alarm (Boyle), a bronze statue in Chicago, US
- The Alarm (de Troy), a 1723 painting by Jean-François de Troy
- Alarm (gamer) (2001–2021), South Korean Overwatch player
- The Alarm (newspaper), an 1880s Chicago-based anarchist periodical

== Other uses ==
- Alarm signal (animal communication), a warning signal used by social animals
- Alarm.com, an American security company
- Mount Alarm, New Zealand
- Warning system, a system that produces alarm signals

== See also ==
- Alarmism
- A Larum (disambiguation)
- Multiple-alarm fire
- Precautionary statement or warning
- The Alarmist, a 1997 film
