= Mitre Peak (Canterbury) =

Mountain in the South Island of New Zealand

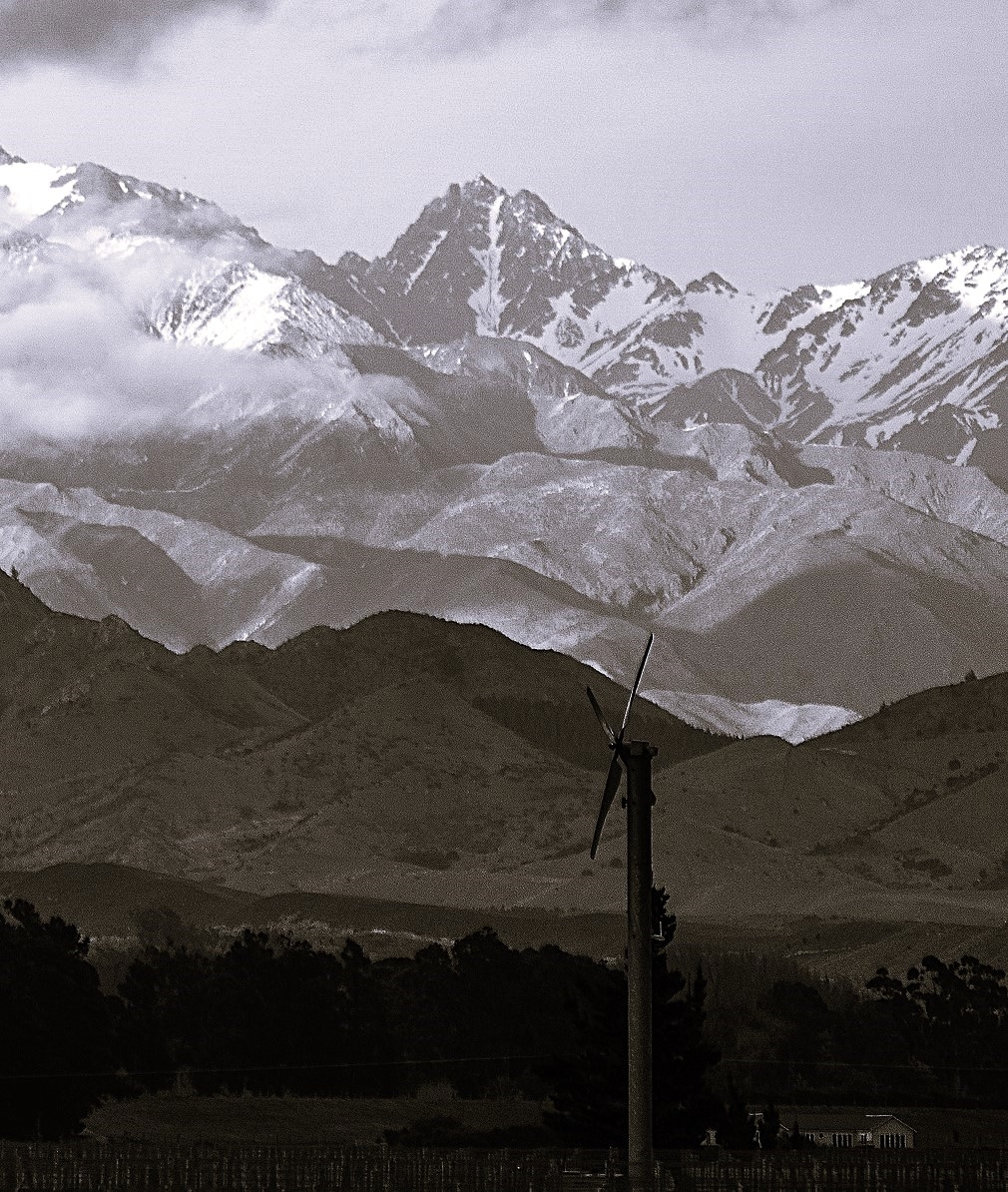
- Northeast aspect

Highest point
- Elevation: 2,621 m (8,599 ft)
- Prominence: 399 m (1,309 ft)
- Isolation: 1.67 km (1.04 mi)
- Listing: New Zealand #37
- Coordinates: 42.00473°S 173.60940°E

Naming
- Etymology: Mitre

Geography
- Location within New Zealand
- Interactive map of Mitre Peak
- Location: South Island
- Country: New Zealand
- Region: Canterbury / Marlborough
- Protected area: Tapuae O Uenuku Scenic Reserve
- Parent range: Kaikōura Ranges
- Topo map: NZMS260 O30

Climbing
- First ascent: 1895

Mitre Peak is a 2,621-metre-elevation (8,599-foot) mountain in the South Island of New Zealand.

== Description ==
Mitre Peak is set on the boundary shared by the Marlborough and Canterbury Regions of the South Island. It is located 43 kilometres north of the town of Kaikōura, where it is part of the Inland Kaikōura Range. Precipitation runoff from the mountain's southeast slope drains to the Waiau Toa / Clarence River via Muzzle Stream, whereas the northeast slope drains to the Hodder River, and the west slope drains to the Winterton River. Topographic relief is significant as the west slope rises 1,100 metres (3,609 feet) in 1.5 kilometre. The nearest higher neighbour is Mount Alarm, 2.4 kilometres to the east. The first ascent of the summit was made in January 1895 by Alexander, Fowler, Neville, and Moore via the North East Couloir. The South East Ridge was first climbed in January 1969 by John Nankervis, Ross Gooder, and Bob Gunn. This mountain's toponym has been officially approved by the New Zealand Geographic Board. This peak should not be confused with the Mitre Peak at Milford Sound.

== Climate ==
Based on the Köppen climate classification, Mitre Peak is located in a marine west coast climate zone (Cfb). Prevailing westerly winds blow moist air from the Tasman Sea onto the mountain, where the air is forced upwards by the mountains (orographic lift), causing moisture to drop in the form of rain and snow. The months of December through February offer the most favourable weather for viewing or climbing this peak.

== See also ==
- List of mountains of New Zealand by height

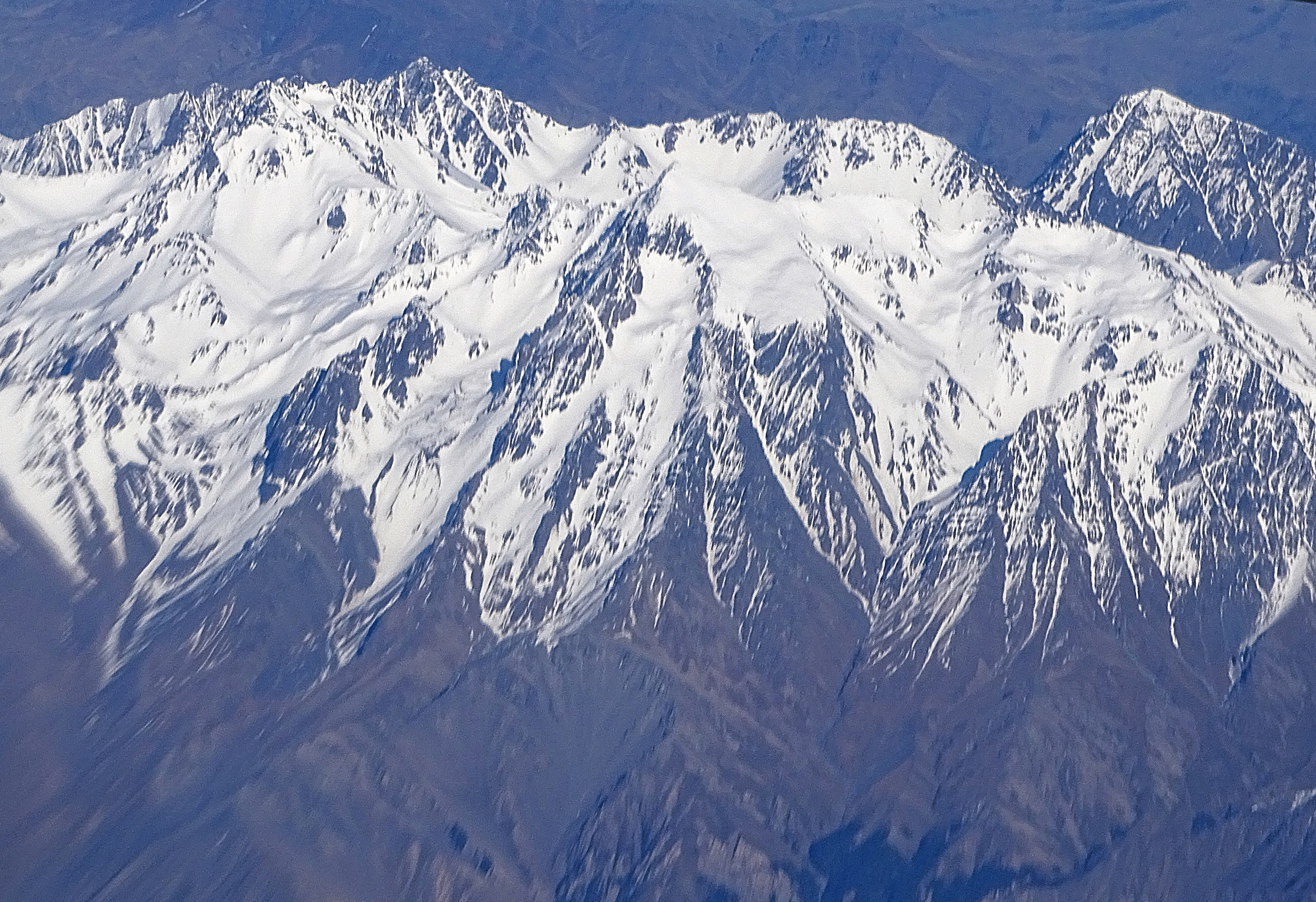
Airliner view of the Inland Kaikōura Range featuring Mount Alarm, Mitre Peak, Tapuae-o-Uenuku, and Mount Gladstone
