= National Warning System =

American telephone system for emergency alert coordination

- Abbreviation: NAWAS
- Formation: 1978
- Location: United States

The National Warning System (NAWAS) is an automated telephone system used to convey warnings to United States–based federal, state and local governments, as well as the military and civilian population. The original mission of NAWAS was to warn of an imminent enemy attack or an actual accidental missile launch upon the United States. NAWAS still supports this mission but the emphasis is on natural and technological disasters. Organizations are able to disseminate and coordinate emergency alerts and warning messages through NAWAS and other public systems by means of the Integrated Public Alert and Warning System.

NAWAS is operated and fully funded by the Federal Emergency Management Agency (FEMA).

Today, the system consists of what is essentially a 2200+ telephone party line. The phone instruments are designed to provide protection for lightning strikes so they may be used during storms. The interconnecting lines provide some protection by avoiding local telephone switches. This ensures they are available even when the local system is down or overloaded. NAWAS has major terminals at each state Emergency Operations Center and State Emergency Management Facility. Other secondary terminals include local emergency management agencies, National Weather Service field offices and Public-safety answering points (PSAPs).

NAWAS is used to disseminate warning information concerning natural and technological disasters to approximately 2200 warning points throughout the continental United States, Alaska, Hawaii and the Virgin Islands. This information includes acts of terrorism including Weapons of Mass Destruction (WMD), after aircraft incidents/accidents, earthquakes, floods, hurricanes, nuclear incidents/accidents, severe thunderstorms, tornadoes, tsunamis and winter storms or blizzards. NAWAS allows issuance of warnings to all stations nationwide or to selected stations as dictated by the situation.

When the NAWAS is not being used for emergency traffic/tests, State and local government personnel are encouraged to use it for official business.

== See also ==
- Emergency Alert System
- Integrated Public Alert and Warning System
- NOAA Weather Radio

== External links and sources ==
- Integrated Public Alert and Warning System (IPAWS)
- FEMA Manual 211-2-1: National Warning System Operations
