= Beat the Traffic =

Vehicle traffic situation reporting

Beat the Traffic was a provider of vehicle traffic reporting solutions for broadcast media and consumers. With a focus on daily commuters, Beat the Traffic was founded in 2001 by former CEO Andre Gueziec. On September 10, 2012, Pelmorex announced it had acquired Beat the Traffic.

Using information compiled from public and private sources, crowd-sourced content coupled with its own reporting teams, Beat the Traffic provided real-time traffic information and maps for most major cities in the US and Canada. As of January 2017, Beat the Traffic is no longer an active website or application.

== Consumer products ==
Beat the Traffic mainly disseminated its traffic information to users through its website and mobile app. Available features included:

- Color-coded traffic map showing areas of congestion
- Personalized routes, enabling a one-click access to most driven routes’ traffic conditions
- Live traffic cameras
- Incidents reports

== Beat the Traffic Mobile App ==
Beat the Traffic’s mobile app is no longer available. Previously it was available for both iPhone and Android.

With more than 2.8 million downloads and over 600,000 users, Beat the Traffic app had been named “Top 5 Traffic Apps to change your commute” and “Top 5 apps for your car” by Lifehacker and CraveOnline.

== Beat the Traffic Website ==
Beat the Traffic's website is no longer available.

== Data sources ==
Beat the Traffic sourced its traffic information from data providers as well as from the public in order to deliver traffic conditions.

Much of the information came from public and private agencies according to geographical areas.

Traditional methods:

Much of the information comes from public and private agencies according to geographical areas.

== Awards ==
- Recipient of the 2010 STAR Award at NAB Show and received the Television Broadcast magazine’s Top Innovation Award at the National Association of Broadcasters' (NAB) trade show.

== U.S. patents ==
The company has received 10 U.S. patents

- Jan. 24, 2006: Patent No. 6,989,765 “Personalized Traffic Information System”
- January 9, 2007: Patent No. 7,161,497 “System for Aggregating Traveler Information”
- May 22, 2007: Patent No. 7,221,287 “Three-Dimensional Traffic Report”
- May 20, 2008: Patent No, 7,375,649 “Traffic Routing Based on Segment Travel Time”
- March 24, 2009: Patent No, 7,508,321 “System and method for predicting travel time for a travel route”
- July 7, 2009: Patent No, 7, 557,730 “GPS-Generated Traffic Information”
- October 27, 2009: Patent No, 7,610,145 “System and method for determining recommended departure time ”
- April 20, 2010: Patent No, 7,702,452 "System and method for determining a prediction of average speed for a segment of roadway"
- February 1, 2011: Patent No, 7,880,642 "GPS-generated traffic information"
- January 24, 2012: Patent No, 8,103,443 "System and method for delivering departure notifications"
