= A Larum (disambiguation) =

A larum is an alarm cry meaning "to arms!", from Old Italian all'arme.

A Larum may refer to:

- A Larum for London, a 1602 play by an anonymous author
- A Larum, a 2008 album by folk rock musician Johnny Flynn

== See also ==
- Mater Larum, or mother of the Lares
