= Alberta Emergency Alert =

System used in Alberta, Canada

- Type: Emergency warning and notification system
- Launch date: October 2011; 14 years ago
- Dissolved: 2023
- Official website: www.emergencyalert.alberta.ca
- Replaced: Emergency Public Warning System
- Replaced by: Alert Ready

Alberta Emergency Alert (AEA) was a public warning system in Alberta. The system was implemented in October 2011, replacing the former Alberta Emergency Public Warning System (EPWS). Based on Common Alerting Protocol (CAP), alerts were disseminated through various media outlets including television and radio, internet, social media mobile apps, and telephone broadcast.

In March 2015, per an order by the CRTC, it became mandatory for all radio and television broadcasters to participate in an emergency alert system such as AEA. In April 2018, it also became mandatory for all wireless service providers to participate. In 2023, AEA was decommissioned by the Alberta government as an autonomous system, in favor of migrating all participants to the national Alert Ready system operated by Pelmorex.

== Operation ==
Alerts are set into two stages; an "Information Alert", in which the public is advised to be prepared for potentially life-threatening emergencies. Information Alerts do not interrupt TV and radio broadcast. A "Critical Alert" in which potentially life-threatening danger is imminent or present such as a tornado touchdown or civil emergency. All television stations and providers, radio stations, and LTE wireless networks in Alberta must transmit "Critical" messages from Alberta Emergency Alert.

Unlike the previous system (where the alerts were read on-air by an announcer), alerts are read using a text-to-speech system. Initially, the quality of its voice was criticized, with viewers considering it unclear and prone to mispronouncing the names of locations. In 2013, a new, male voice was implemented, which was programmed to have clearer pronunciations of various terms and place names.

Effective March 31, 2015 for television and radio broadcasters, and April 6, 2018 for LTE wireless networks, carriage of AEA "Critical" messages became mandatory under CRTC rules regarding the implementation of Alert Ready, a national emergency notification system developed by Pelmorex that uses a modified version of the Common Alerting Protocol (CAP) also used by AEA. As AEA also included messages from the National Alert Aggregation and Dissemination (NAAD) system, while maintaining its existing infrastructure, broadcasters' existing participation in AEA was sufficient to comply with the national alerting mandate.

On April 30, 2022, the Alberta Emergency Management Agency (AEMA) announced that the AEA infrastructure would be decommissioned by March 2023, in favour of fully adopting NAAD; broadcasters would be required to reprogram their CAP decoders to point to the national system. On March 1, 2023, Alberta held one of the two biannual tests of Alert Ready in order to test the migrated system, and provide public awareness for the beginning of wildfire season. A technical glitch led to the message accidentally being issued nine different times, with seven issued at the announced time, and two shortly afterward. Premier Danielle Smith initially misattributed the glitch to issues with the national system, but an investigation found that the glitch was caused by "old code" in the Alberta system.

== Usage ==
In Alberta, AEMA employs a "decentralized" model for operating emergency alerts, under which local authorities have direct access to the system. By contrast, alerts in other provinces must go through their respective emergency management agency. In November 2023, Pelmorex stated that as of October 31, Alberta had accounted for the most alerts issued out of all provinces in 2023, with 307; most of these alerts were for tornado warnings and wildfires.
