= 9.1 (1)(h) order =

Canadian regulation to order carriage of a television channel on cable systems

A 9.1(1)(h) order (previously known as a 9(1)(h) order) is an order issued by the Canadian Radio-television and Telecommunications Commission (CRTC) pursuant to section 9.1(1)(h) of Canada's Broadcasting Act. It requires that a particular Canadian television channel is must-carry and distributed by all (or a particular subset of) cable, satellite, IPTV, or similar subscription-based television service providers in Canada. In most (but not all) cases, the order requires that the channel be included in the analogue and/or digital basic service, making it available to all subscribers of that TV service provider. A channel subject to such an order, particularly those subject to mandatory carriage on the basic service, was sometimes known as an 9(1)(h) service.

A 9.1(1)(h) order may be applied to specialty channels, licensed television networks, or other types of CRTC-licensed television services. Designation as a 9.1(1)(h) service is independent of the Category A, B, and C designations applied to specialty channels, though in most cases, specialty channels subject to 9.1(1)(h) orders were also Category A services.

== Background ==
Section 9.1(1)(h) of Canada's Broadcasting Act states:

9.1 (1) The Commission may, in furtherance of its objects, [...]

(h) a requirement for a person carrying on a distribution undertaking to carry, on the terms and conditions that the Commission considers appropriate, programming services, specified by the Commission, that are provided by a broadcasting undertaking;

The CRTC uses the powers granted by this section to issue must-carry orders, which compels all Canadian television service providers to make specified television channels available to their subscribers, sometimes subject to various conditions (such as region or packaging). Most of these orders relate to channels that must be carried on analogue and/or digital basic services; in these cases, the orders also mandate per-subscriber wholesale rates to be paid to the operators of each of these channels.

In its 2013 review of applications for mandatory carriage under 9(1)(h), the CRTC stated that it only approves mandatory carriage for channels which "make exceptional contributions to meeting the objectives of the [Broadcasting] Act. These objectives notably include reflecting the ethno-cultural and linguistic diversity of Canada, including the special place of Aboriginal peoples in Canadian society and the needs of official language minority communities; allowing Canadians living with disabilities to participate more fully in the Canadian broadcasting system; and supporting Canada’s democratic life and institutions and its regions, including the North."

The Canadian Broadcasting Corporation's broadcast television networks, CBC Television and Ici Radio-Canada Télé, are also required to be carried in the basic package of all television providers nationwide. Local service providers are also required to offer any local television stations with over-the-air coverage in their service area, as well as the designated provincial education channel(s) and/or legislature channel, if applicable. However, these requirements are codified in the CRTC's Broadcast Distribution Regulations, and are not subject to an explicit mandatory-carriage order. Specialty channels owned by the CBC are not subject to mandatory carriage under the Broadcast Distribution Regulations, but may be subject to 9.1 (1)(h) orders, and to the mandatory distribution rules for all specialty channels.

== Current services ==
=== Mandatory carriage (must-carry) ===
Channel	Scope of mandatory carriage	Monthly wholesale fee for mandatory carriage (Note: If the channel is also offered outside of the scope of the applicable 9(1)(h) order, this fee does not apply, and any fee charged is not regulated by the CRTC.)
Aboriginal Peoples Television Network	Nationwide, on digital basic	$0.38
AMI-tv	Nationwide, on digital basic	$0.20 (anglophone markets) $0.00 (francophone markets)
AMI-télé	Nationwide, on digital basic	$0.00 (anglophone markets) $0.28 (francophone markets)
AMI-audio	Anglophone markets, on digital basic	$0.04
CBC News Network	Francophone markets, on digital basic (Note: These orders are intended to ensure that official-language minority communities have access to news in their language. In the corresponding majority-language markets, these channels are not required to be carried on digital basic, but are subject to mandatory distribution (see below).)	$0.15
CPAC (English- and French-language versions)	Nationwide, on digital basic	$0.13
Canal M	Francophone markets, on digital basic	$0.04
Ici RDI	Anglophone markets, on digital basic	$0.10
Legislative Assemblies of Nunavut and the Northwest Territories	In Nunavut and the Northwest Territories, on the digital basic services of direct-to-home satellite providers	$0.00
MétéoMédia	Cable: Francophone markets, on digital basic Satellite: Nationally, in French-language or bilingual basic packages	$0.22
Natyf TV	Quebec, on digital basic	$0.12
Omni Regional	Nationwide, on digital basic (Note: Omni Regional is a national specialty channel with four regional feeds, which respectively mirror three of the existing Omni Television terrestrial services as well as Quebec affiliate ICI. In markets where a local Omni station or affiliate broadcasts identical programming to the applicable Omni Regional feed, the CRTC has allowed providers (upon request) an exception to the local station carriage rules, such that the provider is only required to carry the Omni Regional feed.)	$0.12
The Weather Network	Cable: Anglophone markets, on digital basic Satellite: Nationally, in English-language or bilingual basic packages	$0.23
TVA	Anglophone markets, on the basic service	$0.00
TV5 Québec Canada (including secondary feed Unis)	Nationwide, on digital basic	$0.24 (anglophone markets) $0.28 (francophone markets)
Uvagut TV	Nationwide, on digital basic	$0.09

=== Mandatory distribution (must-offer) ===
Channel	Scope of order
CBC News Network; CTV News Channel; Ici RDI; Le Canal Nouvelles; The News Forum	"Must-offer" access rights; inclusion in "the best available discretionary package consistent with their genre and programming" (all of these channels are discretionary news channels)
Ici ARTV	"Must-offer" access rights on the digital service of cable/IPTV service providers in anglophone markets

Note that Category A services are also considered "must-offer" services under the Broadcast Distribution Regulations for services in the majority language of the market where the provider operates, and in all cases for satellite providers, and thus do not require a separate 9.1(1)(h) order. (The 9(1)(h) order for Ici ARTV, a French-language Category A service, only relates to its carriage in anglophone markets, which is not mandatory under those regulations.)

== Former services ==
- Avis de Recherche – The channel was granted mandatory distribution within Quebec in 2007, confirmed in a separate decision in 2008. A renewal of the 9(1)(h) order was denied in 2013; Avis de Recherche continues to operate as a discretionary service.
- Sun News Network – Like other national news channels, it was subject to the same mandatory distribution order as the other national news channels (inclusion in "the best available discretionary package consistent with their genre and programming") from March 2014 until the channel's shutdown on February 13, 2015.
