= Pelmorex =

Canadian weather information company

Pelmorex Corp.
- Founded: 1989; 37 years ago
- Founder: Pierre L. Morrissette
- Headquarters: Oakville, Ontario
- Subsidiaries: The Weather Network, MétéoMédia, Eltiempo.es, Clima, Wetter Plus
- Website: www.pelmorex.com

Pelmorex Corp. is a Canadian weather information and media company. Based in Oakville, Ontario, it is the owner of the Canadian specialty channels The Weather Network (English) and MétéoMédia (French), and their associated digital properties.

Founded in 1989, "Pelmorex" is a portmanteau derived from the name of the company's chairman and controlling shareholder, Pierre L. Morrissette.

== History ==
Pelmorex Corp. was established in 1989 and acquired The Weather Network and MeteoMedia shortly after. The brand grew in Canada and in 1996, The Weather Channel in the United States became a strategic minority shareholder.

In the early 1990s, the company owned the Pelmorex Radio Network stations in Northern Ontario. The company sold the stations in 1998 and 1999, to Telemedia and Haliburton Broadcasting Group respectively.

In 2006, Pelmorex purchased the operations of World Weatherwatch, a meteorological service company with clients such as the Ontario Ministry of Transportation, Hydro One and Bruce Nuclear Generating Station. Terms of the transaction were not disclosed.

In 2012, Pelmorex acquired the Spanish weather website eltiempo.es, where it focused on bolstering its digital and marketing operations, and hiring prominent local personality José Antonio Maldonado. It also acquired the traffic information provider Beat the Traffic. In 2013, Ron Close became the new president and CEO of the company. The company also began to plot out further expansion in Europe, Latin America, and the United States, as well as optimization of digital advertising delivery based on weather data.

In 2015, Pelmorex bought out The Weather Channel's 49% stake in the company.

== Public alerting ==
In 2001, Pelmorex first proposed that an emergency population warning system, "All Channel Alert", be implemented by all television providers, using proprietary Pelmorex hardware and funded primarily via an increase in carriage fees for The Weather Network/MétéoMédia. The CRTC rejected the proposal, citing the need to consult with the industry over design, costs, and governance of the system.

In 2010, Pelmorex established a "national aggregator and distributor" (NAAD) of localized emergency alert messages compliant with the Common Alerting Protocol as a condition of a request for must-carry status for the two channels. It is governed by representatives of the broadcasting industry, the federal government, members of the Senior Officials Responsible for Emergency Management (SOREM), and the Canadian Association for Public Alerting and Notification. In 2011, the CRTC renewed the must-carry status, under the condition that Pelmorex allow all federal, provincial and territorial emergency management officials to have access to the system, that it commit at least $1 million per-year on public awareness campaigns, and that it develop "broadcast-intrusive" alerts. On August 29, 2014, the CRTC ruled that all over-the-air television channels, radio stations, and television providers must begin relaying emergency messages relayed via NAAD beginning March 31, 2015; Pelmorex markets this under the public-facing brand "Alert Ready" (French: En Alerte). Beginning April 2018, emergency alerts also became mandatory on mobile phones.
