= Mount Alarm =

Mountain in New Zealand

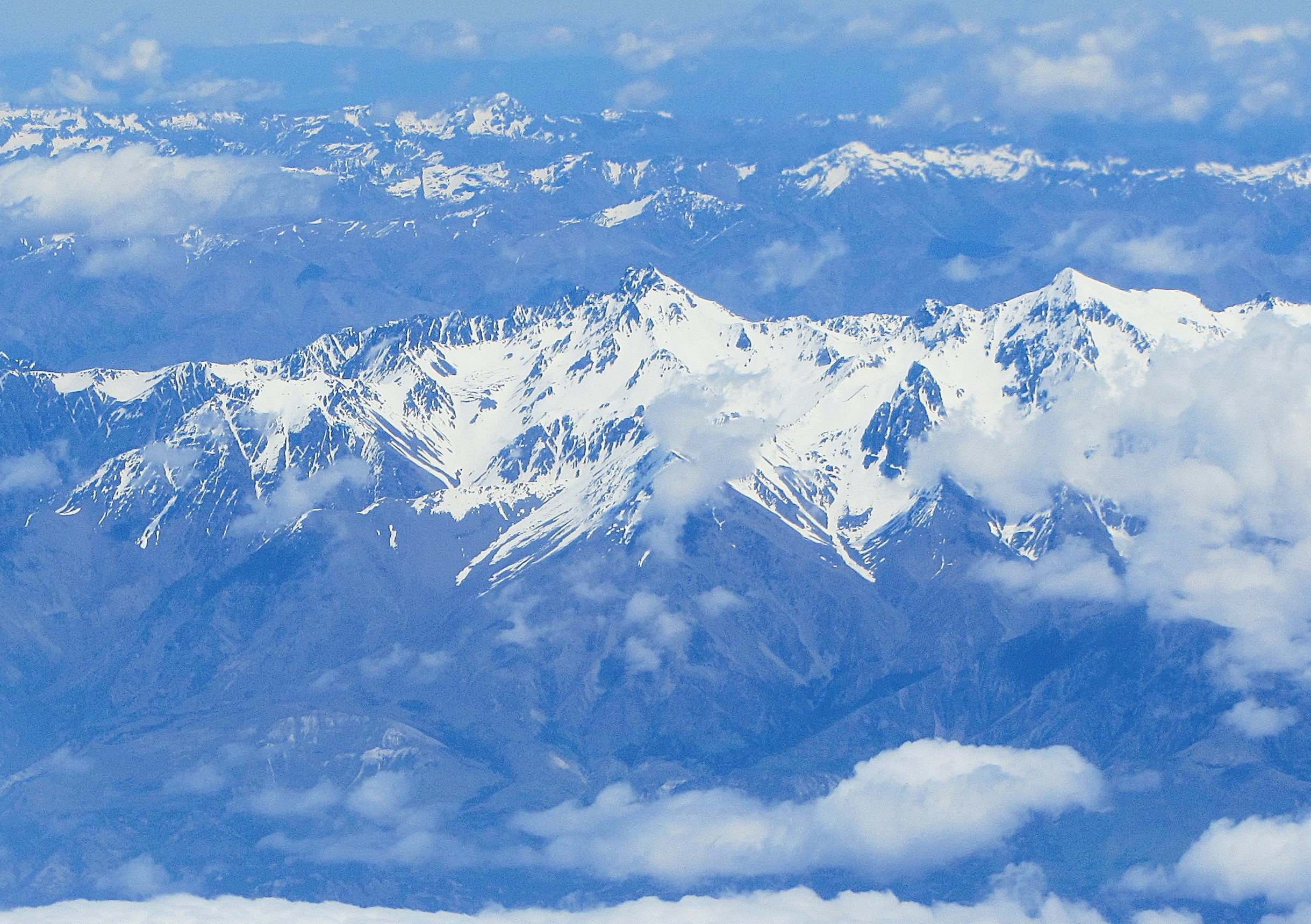
- Southeast aspect, centred (Tapuae-o-Uenuku to right)

Highest point
- Elevation: 2,877 m (9,439 ft)
- Prominence: 397 m (1,302 ft)
- Isolation: 2.57 km (1.60 mi)
- Listing: New Zealand #13
- Coordinates: 42.00943°S 173.637511°E

Geography
- Location within New Zealand
- Interactive map of Mount Alarm
- Location: South Island
- Country: New Zealand
- Region: Canterbury / Marlborough
- Protected area: Tapuae O Uenuku Scenic Reserve
- Parent range: Kaikōura Ranges
- Topo map(s): NZMS260 O30; Topo50 BS27

Geology
- Rock age: Cretaceous
- Rock type: Igneous rock

Climbing
- First ascent: 1928

Mount Alarm is a 2,877-metre-elevation (9,439-foot) mountain in the South Island of New Zealand.

== Description ==
Mount Alarm is set on the boundary shared by the Marlborough and Canterbury Regions of the South Island. It is located 42 kilometres north of the town of Kaikōura where it ranks as the second-highest peak in the Inland Kaikōura Range. Precipitation runoff from the mountain's south slope drains to the Waiau Toa / Clarence River, whereas the north slope drains to the Hodder River. Topographic relief is significant as the south face rises 700 metres (2,297 feet) in less than one kilometre. The nearest higher neighbour is Tapuae-o-Uenuku, 2.58 kilometres to the northeast. The first ascent of the summit was made in 1928 by T.H. Fyffe and I.E. Rawnsley. This mountain's toponym has been officially approved by the New Zealand Geographic Board.

== Climate ==
Based on the Köppen climate classification, Mount Alarm is located in a marine west coast climate zone (Cfb). Prevailing westerly winds blow moist air from the Tasman Sea onto the mountain, where the air is forced upwards by the mountains (orographic lift), causing moisture to drop in the form of rain and snow. The months of December through February offer the most favourable weather for viewing or climbing this peak.

== Climbing ==
Climbing routes with the first ascents:

- North East Ridge – T.H. Fyffe, I.E. Rawnsley – (1928)
- Branch Stream Route – J.H. Rose, Laird Thomson, Frank Simmonds – (1932)
- North West Ridge – George Carr, Ray Vickers – (1967)
- North Face – FA unknown

== Gallery ==
Tapuae-o-Uenuku (left) and Mount Alarm (right)

== See also ==
- List of mountains of New Zealand by height
