= MétéoMédia =

Canadian French-language cable television channel

- Country: Canada
- Broadcast area: National
- Headquarters: Montreal, Quebec

Programming
- Language: French
- Picture format: 1080i (HDTV)

Ownership
- Owner: Pelmorex
- Sister channels: The Weather Network

History
- Launched: September 1, 1988

Links
- Website: www.meteomedia.com

MétéoMédia is a Canadian French-language weather information specialty channel and web site owned by Pelmorex. MétéoMédia primarily serves viewers in Quebec, although some cable TV systems in Ontario and New Brunswick carry the channel as well. It is available nationwide via satellite. MétéoMédia went on the air along with the bilingual specialty service's English-language component, The Weather Network, for the first time on September 1, 1988; both MétéoMédia and The Weather Network broadcast separate 24-hour-a-day feeds.

== Ownership ==
Original logo used until 2011

Both MétéoMedia and the Weather Network are owned by Pelmorex. The two originally shared an analogue transponder on one of the Anik satellites, with computer-generated local forecasts airing on one while the video feed of a live forecaster or TV commercials aired on the other. They swapped these two roles every five minutes.

On January 3, 2008, it was reported that Landmark Communications, part-owner of MétéoMédia, may be for sale. In July 2008, the Weather Channel was sold to NBCUniversal and Bain Capital; the sale included Landmark's stakes in MétéoMedia and the Weather Network. Comcast, the parent of NBCUniversal, subsequently sold this minority interest to Pelmorex in 2015.

== Shows ==
MétéoMedia follows a schedule which repeats itself each hour, based on the current season. The spring/summer programming schedule often starts on the first Monday of April. It switches to the winter schedule on the first Monday of December. The following segments are commonly seen on the network:

- Prévisions Locales: In the national feed, this is a three-minute bulletin provides viewers with the current temperatures, wind speed and weather conditions in different cities, as well as weather information for the rest of the day and 2 days ahead. Those who receive localized MétéoMédia feeds get a comprehensive weather report from their area's nearest weather station, including current conditions, precipitation, UV/pollen forecasts as well as expected weather for the next 24 hours, 4, 7 and 14 days. Prévisions Locales broadcasts every 10 minutes.
- Météo Active: A detailed analysis of the current weather across Quebec, including the weather expected statewide over the next five days.
- Nouvelles MétéoMédia: Broadcast at :12 and :42 past the hour, this segment provides a brief summary of the weather and environmental news.
- Nature en action - Broadcast every 10 minutes on the 3's, a show-reel of significant weather making headlines around the world.

MétéoMédia also provides seasonal segments, include: Prévisions Pollen (spring/summer), Prévisions UV (spring/summer), Conditions du Ski (autumn/winter),...

== Notable former personalities ==
- Nathalie Chung — Weather presenter
