= Common Alerting Protocol =

XML-based markup language

The Common Alerting Protocol (CAP) is an XML-based data format for exchanging public warnings and emergencies between alerting technologies. CAP allows a warning message to be consistently disseminated simultaneously over many warning systems to many applications, such as Google Public Alerts and Cell Broadcast. CAP increases warning effectiveness and simplifies the task of activating a warning for responsible officials.

Standardized alerts can be received from many sources and configure their applications to process and respond to the alerts as desired. Alerts from the Department of Homeland Security, the Department of the Interior's United States Geological Survey, and the United States Department of Commerce's National Oceanic and Atmospheric Administration (NOAA), and state and local government agencies can all be received in the same format by the same application. That application can, for example, sound different alarms, based on the information received.

By normalizing alert data across threats, jurisdictions, and warning systems, CAP also can be used to detect trends and patterns in warning activity, such as trends that might indicate an undetected hazard or hostile act. From a procedural perspective, CAP reinforces a research-based template for effective warning message content and structure.

The CAP data structure is backward-compatible with existing alert formats including the Specific Area Message Encoding (SAME) used in NOAA Weather Radio and the broadcast Emergency Alert System as well as new technology such as the Wireless Emergency Alerts (WEA), while adding capabilities such as the following:

- Flexible geographic targeting by using latitude/longitude “boxes” and other geospatial representations in three dimensions
- Multilingual and multi-audience messaging
- Phased and delayed effective times and expirations
- Enhanced message update and cancellation features
- Template support for framing complete and effective warning messages
- Digital encryption and signature capability
- Facility for digital images, audio, and video.

== Background ==
The US National Science and Technology Council (NSTC) November 2000 report on "Effective Disaster Warnings" recommended that "standard method should be developed to collect and relay instantaneously and automatically all types of hazard warnings and reports locally, regionally and nationally for input into a wide variety of dissemination systems."

In 2001, an international independent group of over 120 emergency managers that was convened online by California emergency telecommunications expert Art Botterell began specifying and prototyping the Common Alerting Protocol data structure based on the recommendations of the NSTC report. The project was embraced by the non-profit Partnership for Public Warning and a number of international warning system vendors. A series of field trials and long-term demonstration projects during 2002-03 led to the submission of a draft CAP specification to the OASIS standards process for formalization.

The CAP 1.0 specification was approved by OASIS in April 2004.Based on experience with CAP 1.0, the OASIS Emergency Management Technical Committee adopted an updated CAP 1.1 specification in October 2005.oasis-open.org At a meeting in Geneva in October 2006 the CAP 1.1 specification was taken under consideration by the International Telecommunication Union's Standardization Sector for adoption as an ITU-T recommendation. CAP was subsequently adopted as Recommendation X.1303.

CAP specification version 1.2 has been available since July 2010 at the OASIS website.

== Implementation ==
=== Worldwide ===
In 2007, the International Telecommunication Union, Telecommunication Standardization Sector (ITU-T) adopted the Common Alerting Protocol as Recommendation X.1303. The recommendation annex contains an authoritative ASN.1 module translation of the CAP XML schema that may be useful for some implementations. Rec. X.1303 is within the remit of ITU‑T Study Group 17 (Security), Rapporteur Group on Cybersecurity (Q.4/17) for purposes of further evolution of the standard.

=== Australia ===
The Australian Government Standard for Common Alerting Protocol (CAP-AU-STD, 2012) was developed by a CAP-AU-STD stakeholder group comprising federal agencies Emergency Management Australia, the Bureau of Meteorology, GeoScience Australia, Department of Agriculture, Fisheries and Forestry and the Department of Health as well as a number of State Government authorities and emergency services agencies. The project was co-ordinated by the Australian Government Attorney-General's Department (Australian Emergency Management).

=== Canada ===
In Canada, a working group composed of public alerting practitioners and government agencies has developed a CAP Canadian Profile (CAP-CP) based on CAP but specialized to address the needs of Canadian public alerting stakeholders, such as bilingualism, geocoding for Canada, managed lists of locations and events, etc. The Canadian government has adopted CAP-CP for its National Public Alerting System (NPAS) project. The CAP‑CP working group, along with stakeholders and projects such as the Canadian Public Safety Operations Organization (CanOps) and Netalerts' Sarnia Lambton trial, are now working with and refining CAP‑CP for national application in Canada.

CAP has been implemented for a small-scale, grassroots hazard information system in Sri Lanka following the 2004 Indian Ocean Tsunami. This implementation was part of the "HazInfo Project", funded by Canada's International Development Research Centre.

The province of Alberta adopted CAP as part of its Alberta Emergency Alert system. In March 2015, Alert Ready, a national public warning system based upon CAP-CP, was officially launched. Participation in the system by all broadcasters and television providers is mandated by the Canadian Radio-television and Telecommunications Commission.

=== Germany ===
The Federal Office for Citizen Protection and Disaster Support (Bundesamt für Bevölkerungsschutz und Katastrophenhilfe, BBK) is working on an implementation based on CAP 1.2, which will allow for Internet-based access to data provided by the nation's modular warning system MoWaS. The development of MoWaS is based on the satellite-based warning system SatWaS from 2001, which only provides information to less than 150 state and media entities. In case no broadcast receiver, like a radio or television, is running nearby, the resulting warning effect of SatWaS would be severely limited, because many state-run emergency sirens have been left unmaintained or were dismantled altogether. The use of CAP support in MoWaS should alleviate this problem.

=== Italy ===
The Department of Firefighters, Public Rescue and Civil Defence (Dipartimento dei Vigili del Fuoco, del Soccorso Pubblico e della Difesa Civile ) of the Italian Ministry of the Interior adopted the CAP protocol with two Ministerial Decrees in 2008 and 2011. Since then, its 100 provincial control rooms, 18 regional control rooms and the national control centre exchange a daily average of 25,000 CAP private messages concerning rescue operations in real time. As per the decrees, any emergency stakeholder in Italy which wants to exchange or share data with the Fire Corps in the course of large scale emergency or rescue operations has to adopt the CAP protocol.

The first use of CAP protocol in a civil protection activity in Italy was recorded in 2009, in the aftermath of the Central Italy Earthquake, when the Fire Corps exchanged data with the Ministry for Cultural Heritage to coordinate their efforts in designing and implementing provisional measures for monuments and historical buildings.

On April 5, 2017, an agreement between the "Corpo Nazionale dei Vigili del Fuoco" and the "Arma dei Carabinieri" has been signed to improve the forest fire fighting activities. The interoperability of data exchange that the agreement allows is based on the use of the CAP protocol.

=== United States ===
On September 30, 2010, the Federal Emergency Management Agency (FEMA) officially adopted CAP as the protocol for its new Integrated Public Alert and Warning System (IPAWS), which is designed to disseminate emergency messages via various platforms, including broadcast media (Emergency Alert System), wireless devices (Wireless Emergency Alerts), and other platforms.

== See also ==
- 1seg
- Broadcast Markup Language
