= Emergency Public Warning System =

Emergency warning system in Alberta, Canada

Alberta Emergency Public Warning System
- The slide used during activations
- Type: Emergency warning system
- Country: Canada
- Availability: Alberta
- Dissolved: June 28, 2011
- Replaced by: Alberta Emergency Alert

The Emergency Public Warning System was a system used in the province of Alberta, Canada until June 28, 2011, whereby local or provincial authorities could warn the public about impending or current emergencies affecting their area. The system was proposed by the provincial government after an F4 tornado ripped through Edmonton, Alberta on July 31, 1987, killing 27 people and causing millions of dollars in damage.

The EPWS can be activated by local police, fire, and environmental agencies, Environment Canada, and other provincial and local authorities as required. It can be activated for any of the following reasons:

- Severe weather
- Flood
- Wildfire
- Hazardous material release
- Terrorist threat
- Water contamination
- Amber alert
- Other threats to life, property and safety.

The EPWS was originally operated by the CKUA Radio Network, but was later operated by Black Coral Inc., a private company headquartered in Ottawa, Ontario. It was rebroadcast through various television and radio stations and cable systems provincewide.

In 2011, it was replaced by Alberta Emergency Alert.
