= Civil defense in the United States =

United States Civil Defense
- Abbreviation: USCD
- Formation: 1949
- Type: Civil defense
- Location: United States
- Owner: United States Federal Government
- Subsidiaries: CONELRAD; Emergency Broadcast System; Emergency Alert System (1997–2006); Integrated Public Alert and Warning System

Civil defense in the United States refers to the use of civil defense in the history of the United States, which is the organized non-military effort to prepare Americans for military attack and similarly disastrous events. Late in the 20th century, the term and practice of civil defense fell into disuse. Emergency management and homeland security replaced them.

== History ==
=== Pre–World War ===
There is little known history of civil defense in the United States before the twentieth century. Since ancient times, cities typically built walls and moats to protect from invasion and commissioned patrols and watches to keep an eye out for danger, but such activities have not traditionally been encompassed by the term "civil defense." The US has a particular lack of early civil defense efforts because it was seldom threatened with a significant attack. Nonetheless, there are some early examples of what would today be considered civil defense. For example, as early as 1692, the village of Bedford, New York, kept on staff a drummer, whose responsibility was to sound the town drum in the event of a Native American attack—a very early precursor to the wailing sirens of the Cold War.

=== World War I ===
The old United States Civil Defense logo. The triangle emphasized the 3-step Civil Defense philosophy used before the foundation of FEMA and comprehensive emergency management.

Civil defense truly began to come of age, both worldwide and in the United States, during the first World War—although it was usually referred to as "civilian defense". This was the first major total war, which required the involvement and support of the general population. Strategic bombing during World War I brought bombing raids by dirigibles and airplanes, with thousands of injuries and deaths. Attacks on non-combat ships, like the Lusitania, presented another threat to non combatants. The British responded with an organized effort which was soon copied in the US. This was formalized with the creation of the Council of National Defense on August 29, 1916. Civil defense responsibilities at the federal level were vested in this council, with subsidiary councils at the state and local levels providing additional support—a multi-level structure which was to remain throughout the history of United States civil defense.

As the United States had little threat of a direct attack on its shores, the organization instead "maintained anti-saboteur vigilance, encouraged men to join the armed forces, facilitated the implementation of the draft, participated in Liberty Bond drives, and helped to maintain the morale of the soldiers." This freedom to focus beyond air raid attacks gave United States civil defense a much broader scope than elsewhere. With the end of military conflict, the activities of the Council of National Defense were suspended. Thus, World War I marked the first time that organized civil defense was practised on a large scale in the United States. Although civil defense had not yet reached the scale and significance it soon would, many of the basic features were set in place.

=== World War II ===
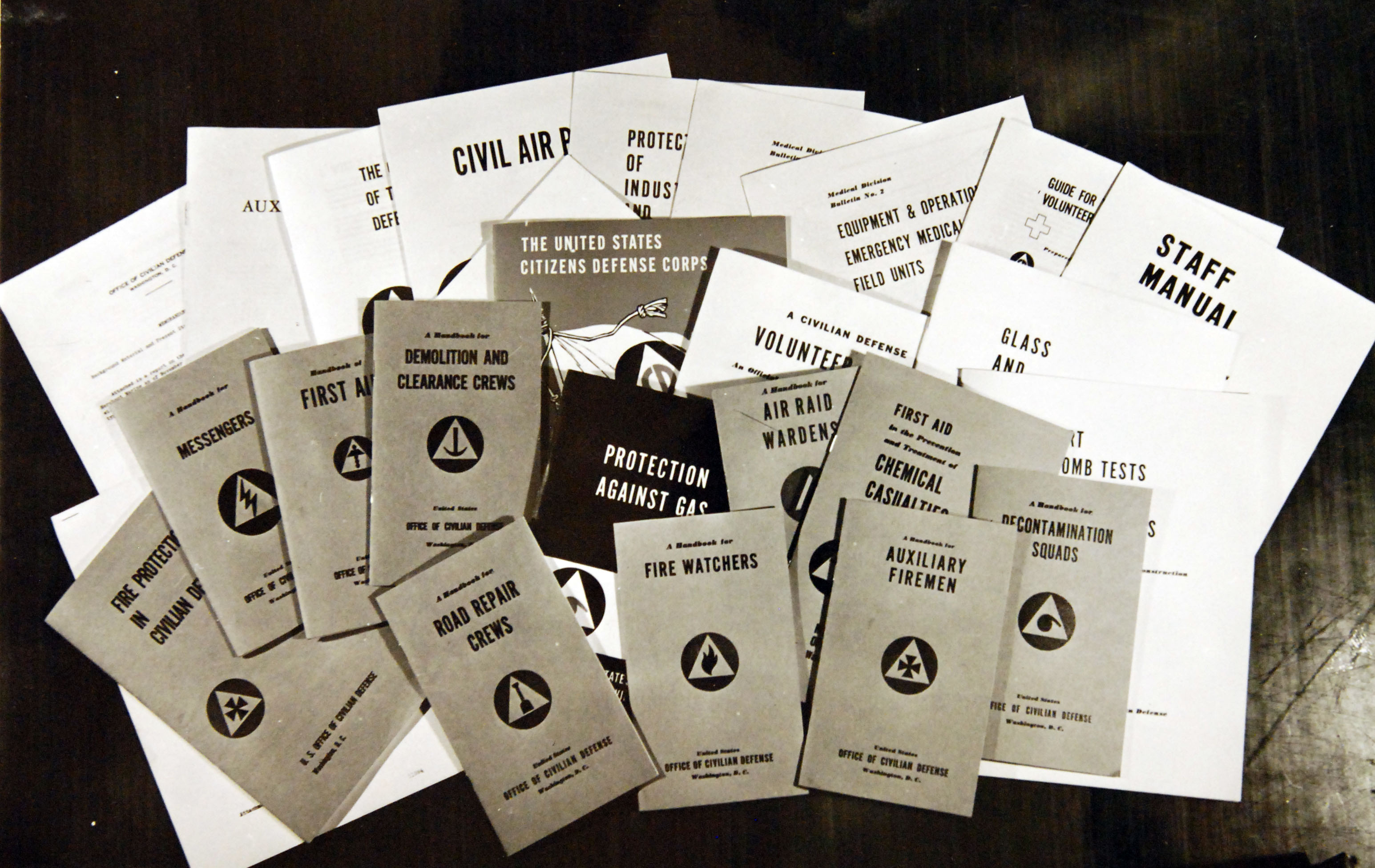
Handbooks, guides, and bulletins showing the variety of opportunities for civilian defense volunteers during WWII

World War II, which the United States entered after the attack on Pearl Harbor, was characterized by a significantly greater use of civil defense. Even before the attack, the Council of National Defense was reactivated by President Roosevelt and created the Division of State and Local Cooperation to further assist the Council's efforts. Thus, the civil defense of World War II began very much as a continuation of that of World War I. Very soon, however, the idea of local and state councils bearing a significant burden became viewed as untenable and more responsibility was vested at the federal level with the creation of the Office of Civilian Defense (OCD) within the Office of Emergency Planning (OEP) in the Executive Office of the President (EOP) on May 20, 1941. The OCD was originally headed by New York Mayor Fiorello La Guardia and was charged with promoting protective measures and elevating national morale.

These organizations and others worked together to mobilize the civilian population in response to the threat. The Civil Air Patrol (CAP), which was created just days before the attack on Pearl Harbor, commissioned civilian pilots to patrol the coast and borders and engage in search and rescue missions as needed. The Civil Defense Corps, run by the OCD, organized approximately 10 million volunteers who trained to fight fires, decontaminate after chemical weapon attacks, provide first aid, and other duties. A Ground Observer Corps watched for enemy aircraft.

These efforts did not replace the kinds of civil defense that took place during World War I. Indeed, World War II saw an even greater use of rationing, recycling, and anti-saboteur vigilance than was seen in World War I. As the threat of air raids or invasions in the United States seemed less likely during the war, the focus on the Civil Defense Corps, air raid drills, and patrols of the border declined but the other efforts continued. Unlike the end of World War I, the US did not dismiss all its civil defense efforts as soon as World War II ended. Instead, they continued after the end of the war and served as the foundation of civil defense in the Cold War.

=== Cold War ===
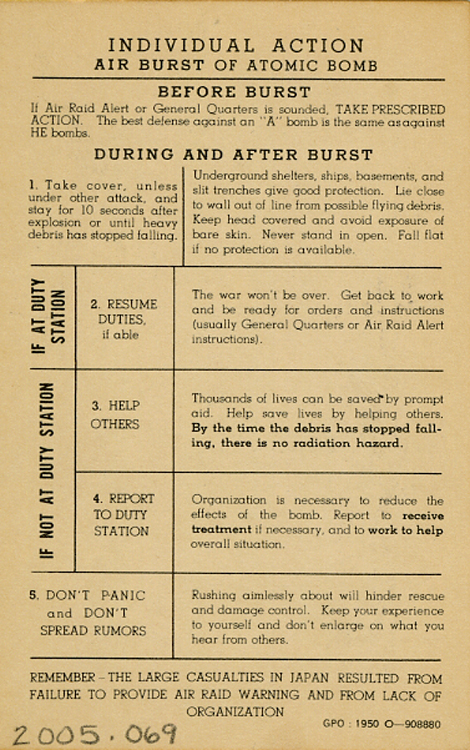
This 1950 atomic bomb information card, meant for US military personnel, describes how in a number of respects an "atomic bomb ("A-bomb") is similar to the effects of a large high explosive ("HE" bomb). While easily misinterpreted as dismissing the post-explosion radiation hazard, the pamphlet mentions the radiation hazard being over after the "debris has stopped falling" because then, the prompt radiation hazard has largely passed. Furthermore, written before the era of the hydrogen bomb (1951) and atomic demolition munitions, the pamphlet does not discuss nuclear fallout as the pamphlet was created at a time when the only conceivable means by which soldiers would encounter nuclear explosions, was when they were air bursts, which does not produce militarily significant fallout.

The new dimensions of nuclear war terrified the world and the American people. The sheer power of nuclear weapons and the perceived likelihood of such an attack on the United States precipitated a greater response than had yet been required of civil defense. Civil defense, something previously considered an important and common-sense step, also became divisive and controversial in the charged atmosphere of the Cold War. In 1950, the National Security Resources Board created a 162-page document outlining a model civil defense structure for the US. Called the "Blue Book" by civil defense professionals in reference to its solid blue cover, it was the template for legislation and organization that occurred over the next 40 years. Despite a general agreement on the importance of civil defense, Congress never came close to meeting the budget requests of federal civil defense agencies. Throughout the Cold War, civil defense was characterized by fits and starts. Indeed, the responsibilities were passed through a myriad of agencies, and specific programs were often boosted and scrapped in a similar manner to US ballistic missile defense (BMD) systems with which it was seen as complementary.

In declassified US war game analyses of the early 1960s, it was estimated that approximately 27 million US citizens would have been saved with civil defense education in the event of a Soviet pre-emptive strike. At the time however the cost of a full-scale civil defense program was, in cost-benefit analysis, deemed less effective than a BMD system, and as the adversary was increasing their nuclear stockpile, both programs would yield diminishing returns.

==== Educational efforts ====
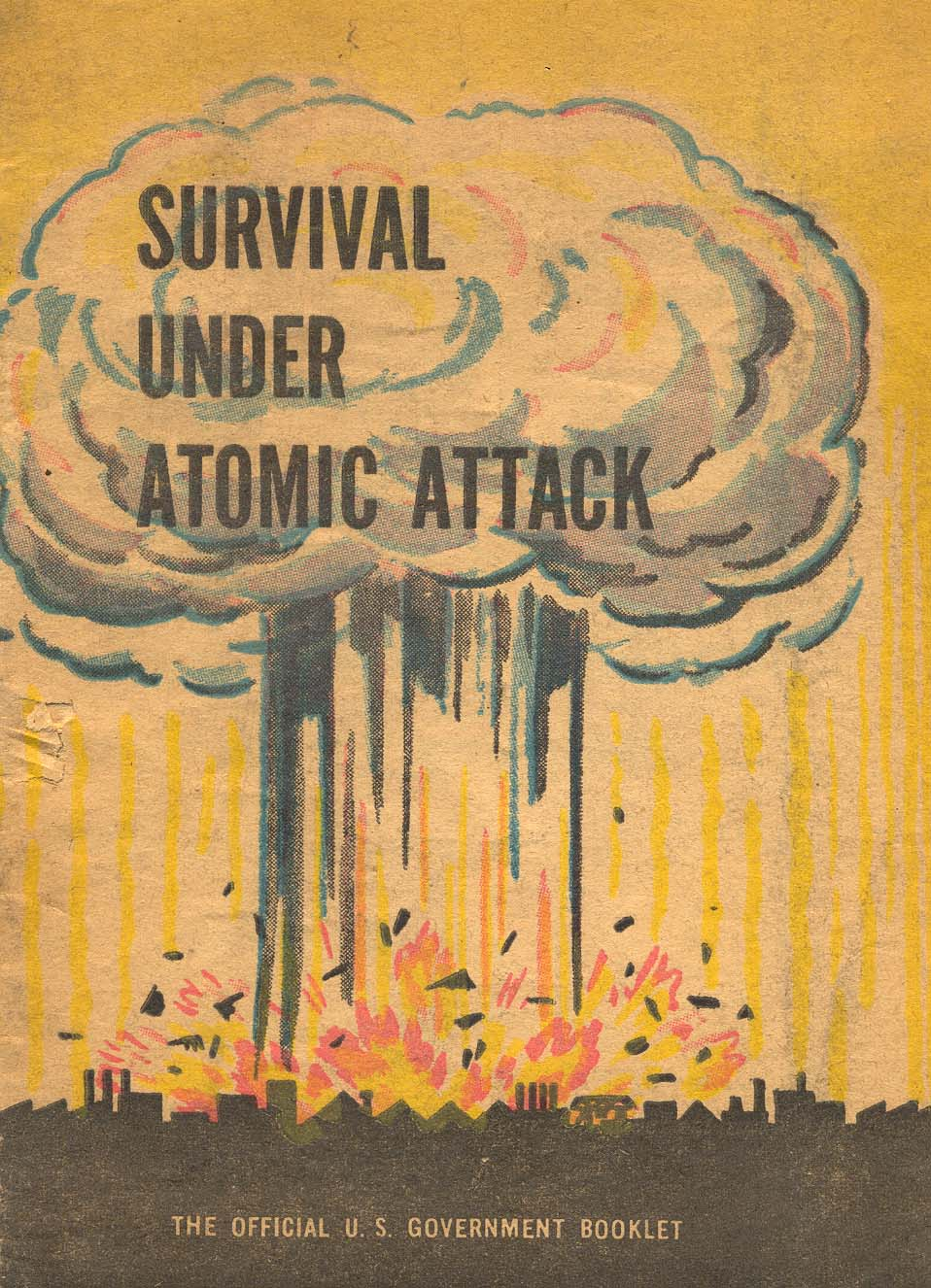
Civil defense literature such as Survival Under Atomic Attack was common during the Cold War Era.

One aspect of the Cold War civil defense program was the educational effort made or promoted by the government. One primary way in which they did this was the publication and production of federally funded films that were distributed to the mass public. In Duck and Cover, Bert the Turtle advocated that children "duck and cover" when they "see the flash". In this film, children are instructed to "kneel with their backs facing the windows, eyes shut, their hands clasped behind their backs." Duck and Cover also reached audiences through printed media and radio waves. This included a 14-minute radio adaptation, a 16-page coloring booklet, and a nationwide newspaper serialization. The image of Bert the Turtle was often seen as a way to defuse tensions related to nuclear weapons. The creators of the cartoon "were forced to pick their way delicately through overly glib depictions of nuclear war on one hand, and terrifying descriptions prescribing hysteria and panic on the other." Thus, children were able to adapt to a world of panic and come to terms with the existence of the bomb while also learning how to prepare for the possibility of nuclear disaster.

Another educational program, produced by the Federal Civil Defense Administration, was Survival Under Atomic Attack. Produced in both film and print, Survival gave Americans information on how to prepare themselves and their homes in the case of a nuclear attack. The film showed citizens how the whole family can get involved in final moments of preparation if they were to hear the warning sirens that alerted them of an incoming attack. Along with popularity of the film, over a million copies of the Survival booklet sold within its first year of publication in 1951. Audiences of both the film and print sources learned specific skills on how to ensure their safety in the case of emergency. This included preparing a first aid kit, storing plenty of water and canned goods, stocking up on batteries for radios and flashlights, and equipping a fallout shelter that they could access easily and safely.

"Duck and Cover" (1951) - Official Civil Defense information film reel.

"Alert America" also sought to teach the American public how to prepare for instances of emergency and the threat of atomic attack. Created in December 1951, the "Alert America" program consisted of three convoys with ten thirty-two-foot trailer trucks that traveled 36,000 miles throughout the nation's 82 major cities and attracted 1.1 million people. While displaying products and information to educate people on the affects and preparedness associated with nuclear weapons, the "Alert America" program also showed federally supported films such as Duck and Cover, Survival Under Atomic Attack, and Our Cities Must Fight.

Educational efforts also targeted women in the form of campaigns such as "Grandma's Pantry". Supported by the National Grocer's Association, various pharmaceutical houses, and the American National Dietetic Association, "Grandma's Pantry" educated women on national guidelines for how, when properly prepared, a home could withstand a nuclear holocaust. Avoiding the scare tactics that were primarily used by other forms of civil defense education, "Grandma's Pantry" instead attempted a supposedly "softer" and so-called "feminine" approach to emergency preparedness by fusing female domesticity with paramilitary education. Through this, women were encouraged to "make ready for the possibility of nuclear war" by warning them against "the possibility of damaged water systems, broken sewer lines, mounting heaps of garbage, and a lack of food and fresh water after an attack", all of which were duties that typically aligned with prescribed gender roles given to women during the postwar era. Thus, civil defense education attempted to seemingly blend into already established societal norms.

"Civil Defense Emergency Preparedness at Marshall Space Flight Center" information film reel, foreword by Wernher von Braun.

In 1958, the FCDA was taken over by the Office of Civil and Defense Mobilization (OCDM). Once that happened, more films for students and families included training in practical life skills lessons that they could implement in the case of nuclear war rather than the hypothetical films that had been put out previously. Home economics courses in grade schools trained students on how to build and maintain fallout shelters, the basics of food preparation and storage, safety and sanitation, child care, and how to care for the sick and injured. These lessons transferred to real life expectations, where even adults were continuously instructed on how to manage homes, perform gendered assigned roles, and prepare their families for the case of nuclear attacks. Such examples were found in literature and educational films which taught women the values and skills of home nursing and first aid that would protect and save the lives of their family members. Women were also taught to be the ones to dominate kitchen work during the first few days within shelters if there was an emergency, only to be relieved by teenagers and young children who were only expected to volunteer when needed.

==== Evacuation plans ====
At the dawn of the nuclear age, evacuation was opposed by the federal government. The Federal Civil Defense Administration produced a short movie called Our Cities Must Fight. It argued that in the event of a nuclear war, people need to stay in cities to help repair the infrastructure and man the recovering industries. "Nuclear radiation," it advised, "would only stay in the air a day or two." Despite this early opposition, evacuation plans were soon created. One city at the forefront of such efforts was Portland, Oregon. In 1955, their city government completed "Operation Greenlight"—a drill to evacuate the city center. Hospital patients were packed into semi-trucks, pedestrians were picked up by passing motorists, and the city's construction equipment and emergency vehicles were rushed out to "dispersal points." The entire city center was evacuated in 19 minutes. On December 8, 1957, CBS Television aired a dramatization of how a well prepared city might respond to an imminent nuclear attack. The show, A Day Called 'X', produced "in co-operation with the Federal Civil Defense Administration," was shot in Portland, using city officials and ordinary citizens instead of professional actors. It was narrated by Glenn Ford.

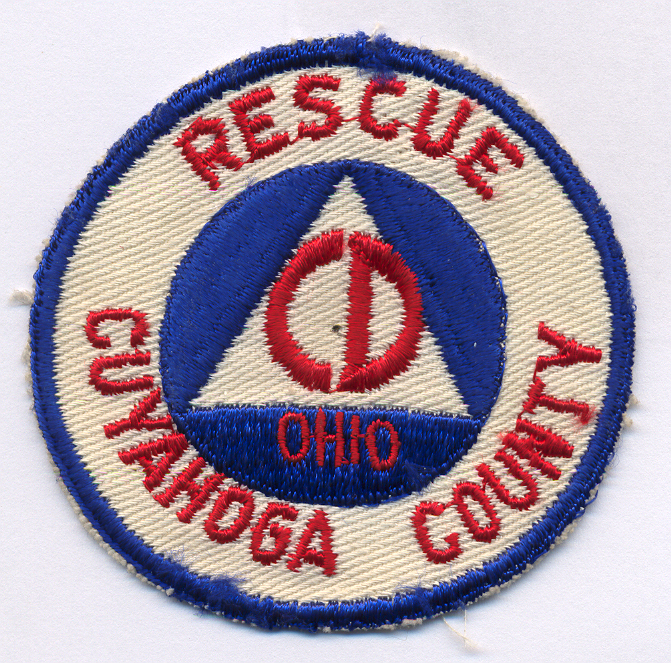
A Civil Defense patch for Cuyahoga County, Ohio

Such plans were plausible in the early days of the Cold War, when an attack would have come from strategic bombers, which would have allowed a warning of many hours, not to mention the high possibility of interception by anti-air systems and fighters. However, the development of intercontinental ballistic missiles in the late 1950s made this goal less realistic. Despite that, civil defense officials still worked to prepare evacuation plans. In 1983, President Ronald Reagan announced the Crisis Relocation Program. The White House suggested that the $10 billion, five-year program could allow the evacuation of targeted urban centers to rural "host areas" and thus save 80% of the population. The plan allowed up to three days for the evacuation to be completed, believing that a nuclear war would not come in a surprise attack but rather as the culmination of a crisis period of rising tensions. However, the plan has been criticized by academics and organizations like the Federation of American Scientists for failing to take into account disruptions to healthcare infrastructure preventing the effective treatment of the wounded, disruption to the food supply, ecological devastation (including nuclear winter), and social unrest following an attack. Because of these shortcomings, Stanford University physician and professor Herbert L. Abrams estimated that no more than 60 million people (25% of the population) would survive if the program was executed as designed.

==== Ensuring continuity of government ====
Governments made efforts to exist even after an apocalyptic nuclear attack, something called continuity of government. Many city halls built Emergency Operation Centers in their basements.

==== Fallout shelters ====
"About Fallout" (1955) - Official U.S. Civil Defense information film reel.

President Kennedy launched an ambitious effort to install fallout shelters throughout the United States. These shelters would not protect against the blast and heat effects of nuclear weapons, but would provide some protection against the radiation effects that would last for weeks and even affect areas distant from a nuclear explosion. As such, some of them were even located on the upper floors of skyscrapers.

CD officials encouraged people to build in the suburbs away from key targets and to be conscientious of the needs of a nuclear age when building houses and other structures.

==== CONELRAD ====
In order for most of these preparations to be effective, there had to be some degree of warning. The United States embarked on creating systems at both the local and national levels to allow the communication of emergencies.

In 1951, President Harry S. Truman established the CONELRAD (Control of Electromagnetic Radiation) Plan. Under the system, a few primary stations would be alerted of an emergency and would broadcast an alert. All broadcast stations throughout the country would be constantly listening to an upstream station and repeat the message, thus passing it from station to station. After broadcasting the message, all radio communications would cease except for two designated lower power AM frequencies (640 and 1240 kHz). This was designed to prevent enemy planes from using transmitters as navigation aids for direction finding. The later threat of ICBMs (which used internal guidance) made this obsolete, and CONELRAD was replaced in 1963.

==== SCATANA ====
The Plan for the Security Control of Air Traffic and Air Navigation Aids (SCATANA) is an emergency preparedness plan of the United States which prescribes the joint action to be taken by appropriate elements of the Department of Defense, Federal Aviation Administration, and the Federal Communications Commission in the interest of national security in order to effectively control air traffic and air navigation aids under emergency conditions. It was activated in two tests in the early 1960s and for real on September 11, 2001. Known versions of the plan are dated June 1971 and August 1975. The plan implements parts of the Federal Aviation Act of 1958, the Communications Act of 1934, and Executive Order 11490 of October 28, 1969 (amended by Executive Order 11921 on June 11, 1976).

==== Operation Alert and opposition to civil defense drills ====
Lets Face It (1954) Federal Civil Defense Hydrogen Bomb Survival & Atomic Tests information film reel.

In 1954, the United States government began an annual national civil defense exercise called "Operation Alert". The exercise extended over several weeks to months, and would culminate in a one-day public drill simulating a nuclear attack. The aim of the annual exercise was to evaluate emergency preparedness in the face of a nuclear attack, determine government continuation readiness, and identify problems that might occur during an alert.

Operation Alert was actively protested by the Catholic Worker Movement, Ralph DiGia, Dorothy Day and others in New York City when held on June 15, 1955. Protesters objected to the notion that a nuclear war was survivable, and answered with the assertion that the only way to survive a nuclear war was for one not to happen at all. 29 were arrested in City Hall Park and jailed for refusing to take shelter during a drill. Protests, initially small and isolated, continued and grew throughout the 1950s. Opposition to the drills increased; young mothers with children joined the protests in 1960. Civil Defense Operation Alert drills were stopped after the 1961 protest.

==== Emergency Broadcast System ====
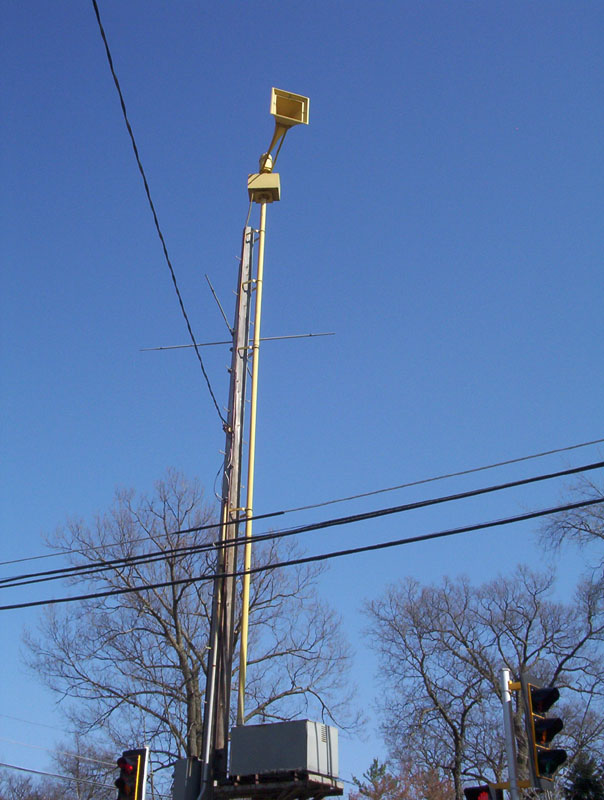
A Thunderbolt siren in Wisconsin

In 1963, the Federal Communications Commission (FCC) created the Emergency Broadcast System to replace CONELRAD. The EBS served as the primary alert system through the Cold War ICBM era and well into the 1990s. In addition to these, air raid sirens such as the Thunderbolt siren pictured to the right, would sound an alert.

=== Post–Cold War ===
Since the end of the Cold War, civil defense has fallen into disuse within the United States. Gradually, the focus on nuclear war shifted to an "all-hazards" approach of comprehensive emergency management. Natural disasters and the emergence of new threats such as terrorism have focused attention away from traditional civil defense into new forms of civil protection such as emergency management and homeland security. In 2006, the old triangle logo was finally retired, replaced with a new logo featuring a stylized EM (for emergency management). The new logo was announced by the Federal Emergency Management Agency; however, a depiction of the old CD logo (without the red CD letters) can be seen above the eagle's head in the FEMA seal. The name and logo, however, continue to be used by Hawaii State Civil Defense Hawaii State Civil Defense and Guam Homeland Security/Office of Civil Defense Guam Homeland Security | Office of Civil Defense. The Republic of the Philippines has an Office of Civil Defense that uses a similar logo.

== Past and present civil defense agencies ==
After the September 11, 2001, attacks, US civil defense planning was conducted within the cabinet-level Department of Homeland Security (DHS). Between 1979 and 2001, the duties of civil defense were served by the Federal Emergency Management Agency (FEMA). Originally an independent agency, FEMA was absorbed into DHS in 2003. Before the creation of FEMA in 1979 the responsibility for civil defense in the United States was shared between a wide variety of short-lived and frequently changing departments, agencies, and organizations. Some of the notable national pre-FEMA organizations in the US included:

- Council of National Defense
- Joint Task Force - Civil Support
- Office of Emergency Planning (OEP) in the Executive Office of the President (EOP)
- Office of Civil Defense (OCD) in the Office of Emergency Planning
- Civil Air Patrol
- National Security Resources Board (NSRB), both as an independent agency and as an office within the Executive Office of the President
- Office of Defense Mobilization in the Executive Office of the President
- Office of Defense and Civilian Mobilization in the Executive Office of the President
- Office of Civil and Defense Mobilization in the Executive Office of the President
- Office of Emergency Planning in the Executive Office of the President
- Office of Emergency Preparedness in the Executive Office of the President
- Federal Civil Defense Administration (FCDA), both as an independent agency and as a board within the Executive Office of the President
- State defense forces of individual US states
- United States Coast Guard Auxiliary

== See also ==
- American Civil Defense Association
- Blast shelter
- NYPD Auxiliary Police
- State defense force
