= Security Control of Air Traffic and Air Navigation Aids =

US emergency preparedness plan

The Plan for the Security Control of Air Traffic and Air Navigation Aids (SCATANA) was an emergency preparedness plan of the United States which prescribed the joint action to be taken by appropriate elements of the Department of Defense, Federal Aviation Administration (FAA), and the Federal Communications Commission in the interest of national security in order to effectively control air traffic and air navigation aids under emergency conditions. Known versions of the plan are dated June 1971 and August 1975. The plan implements parts of the Federal Aviation Act of 1958, the Communications Act of 1934, and Executive Order 11490 of October 28, 1969 (amended by Executive Order 11921 on June 11, 1976). It was only used during the September 11 attacks.

The plan was replaced in 2006 by the Plan for the Emergency Security Control of Air Traffic (ESCAT), which is jointly operated with Canada and has never been activated. Until 2002, Canada had its own counterpart of the SCATANA plan, which it also activated during the September 11 attacks in order to facilitate Operation Yellow Ribbon.

== September 11 attacks ==
The U.S. plan was only activated (other than tests) on September 11, 2001. The codeword was broadcast ordering that all U.S. air traffic be grounded, after the September 11 attacks. Even in that instance, the emergency plan was only partially implemented as the Defense Department left command and control of the air traffic system with the FAA and intentionally allowed all radio navigational aids to remain in operation to aid in the process of controlling and landing the thousands of planes which were aloft in domestic airspace.

The 9/11 Commission Report never refers to SCATANA directly, but it does discuss this unprecedented order and commends the air traffic controllers who carried it out.

While several people have been credited with issuing the SCATANA order, the 9/11 Commission credits FAA National Operations Manager Ben Sliney with effectively issuing the directive. At 9:42 am on the morning of September 11, 2001, after the Air Traffic Control System Command Center learned from news reports that a plane (American Airlines Flight 77) had crashed into the Pentagon, Sliney "ordered all FAA facilities to instruct all aircraft to land at the nearest airport".

== See also ==
- CONELRAD
