= FCDA =

FCDA may refer to:

- Federal Civil Defense Administration, a defunct official US government agency that operated from 1951 to 1958
- Federal Civil Defense Authority, an official US government agency that operated from 1972 to 1979, when it was succeeded by the Federal Emergency Management Agency (FEMA)
