= Civ-Alert =

Civil defense warning system in Hawaii, 1960–1977

Civ-Alert was the civil defense warning system in the U.S. state of Hawaii from 1960 to 1977. Civ-Alert was established in the wake of the tsunami generated by the 1960 Valdivia earthquake on the Chilean coast, which devastated Hilo. Unlike CONELRAD, the warning system in use in the mainland United States, Civ-Alert consisted of the transmission of civil defense information and instructions from a studio at state Civil Defense headquarters in Diamond Head on existing radio station frequencies; this was important, as no one radio station could cover the entire Hawaiian islands. The Civ-Alert system was a major improvement. It led to the redesign of emergency warnings in the mainland U.S. as a similar system, the Emergency Broadcast System (EBS). Civ-Alert was rebranded as EBS in May 1977.

== History ==
The 1960 Valdivia earthquake, whose tsunami pummeled Hilo and led to the deaths of 65 people, exposed serious deficiencies in the island-wide warning system for natural disasters. The islands' existing warning system had been created in 1946, after a tsunami killed 150, and was described by scientists after Valdivia as a "horse and buggy" system that failed to account for advances in tsunami forecasting. Civil Defense responded by conducting a massive overhaul of its warning systems. It earmarked money to install 71 new sirens across the state, as well as $20,000 to establish Civ-Alert, a statewide system to broadcast civil defense information over all Hawaii radio stations. This system was conceived by Jock Fernhead at radio station KPOI.

Civ-Alert was approved for use in November 1960 and began full-time service on December 1, 1960. It was tested for the first time on January 3, 1961, and all Honolulu radio stations received the signal from Civil Defense in Diamond Head; they were equipped with warning lights to make them aware of impending Civ-Alert broadcasts. Civil Defense leaders soon sought authorization to have Civ-Alert supplant CONELRAD, the system used nationwide. CONELRAD depended on stations alternating time at one of two frequencies, 640 or 1240 kHz, on reduced power. This was not sufficient for use in Hawaii because a station operating at reduced power in CONELRAD mode might not be able to reach all of the islands. In July 1961, CONELRAD was formally discontinued in Hawaii.

Civ-Alert suffered issues in warning of a potential tsunami on December 20, 1962. It took ten minutes for Civ-Alert to activate, muddling an already confused warning setup. At one point, two Oahu radio stations were telling listeners it was safe to return to their homes while Civ-Alert continued the alert. Among the plans for improving the civil defense system was adding audible buzzers, in addition to the warning lights already in use, to radio studios to notify stations of incoming announcements. The system's performance was much improved in the wake of the 1965 Rat Islands earthquake in the Aleutian Islands; Civ-Alert went on the air three hours before the tidal wave was predicted to arrive on Oahu. The Honolulu Advertiser editorial board praised the broadcasting of director Roger Coryell, also a veteran newsman, and the network setup which also included DJ Hal Lewis as program director; a cartoon by Harry Lyons called the system "Hawaii's Paul Revere". By 1966, Civ-Alert had been expanded to provide notification to TV stations and movie theaters, while audio messages were additionally relayed on Muzak background music systems for broadcast in stores.

The success of Civ-Alert led to the scrapping of CONELRAD on the U.S. mainland. Federal officials investigated the Hawaii system and discontinued CONELRAD in 1963 in favor of the Emergency Broadcast System (EBS). The California state plan for the Emergency Alert System (EAS), successor to the EBS, credits Civ-Alert as "arguably the parent of the EBS and EAS". Hawaii was linked to the mainland EBS system in 1967, with five EBS stations on the four major islands. The statewide civil defense alert system continued to go by the Civ-Alert name until May 1977.
