= This is a test =

This is a test may refer to:

- The testing of the Emergency Alert System
- The testing of the former Emergency Broadcast System
- This is a Test, a 2017 song by Armin van Buuren
