= Sliney =

Sliney is a surname. Notable people with the surname include:

- Ben Sliney (born 1945), American air traffic controller
- Molly Sullivan Sliney (born 1966), American fencing competitor
- Will Sliney (fl. 2012–present), Irish comic book artist
