= Emergency override system =

Emergency information system in the United States

- Screen displayed for emergency override system activation in St. Joseph, Missouri, c. 1990
- Type: Emergency warning system
- Country: United States
- Replaced by: Emergency Alert System

An emergency override system (also known as cable override or emergency alert system, among other terms) is a system designed to warn subscribers of cable television broadcast feeds of threats such as severe weather and other civil emergencies.

== History ==
One of the earliest alerting systems developed specifically for cable television was implemented in the city of Alexandria, Louisiana in 1962 by Alpine Cable TV Co., a Louisiana-based cable television company. The system, built by Virgil Evans and Ed Baldridge, utilized a closed-circuit signal that allowed for continued operation even if CONELRAD went off the air in addition to avoiding the transmission of signals into the air that could be detected by enemy aircraft. The system was operated by the Rapides Parish Civil Defense office, who could insert emergency messages on cable Channel 3.

Digital Alert Systems, which was once a subsidiary company of Monroe Electronics before 2018, claims that Monroe Electronics developed the first emergency override system for cable television in the late 1960s. Other companies would manufacture such systems of their own, some examples including the Civil Emergency Alert System by Cadco Systems, the Emergency Alert System by Idea/onics, and the CommAlert series by Scientific Atlanta.

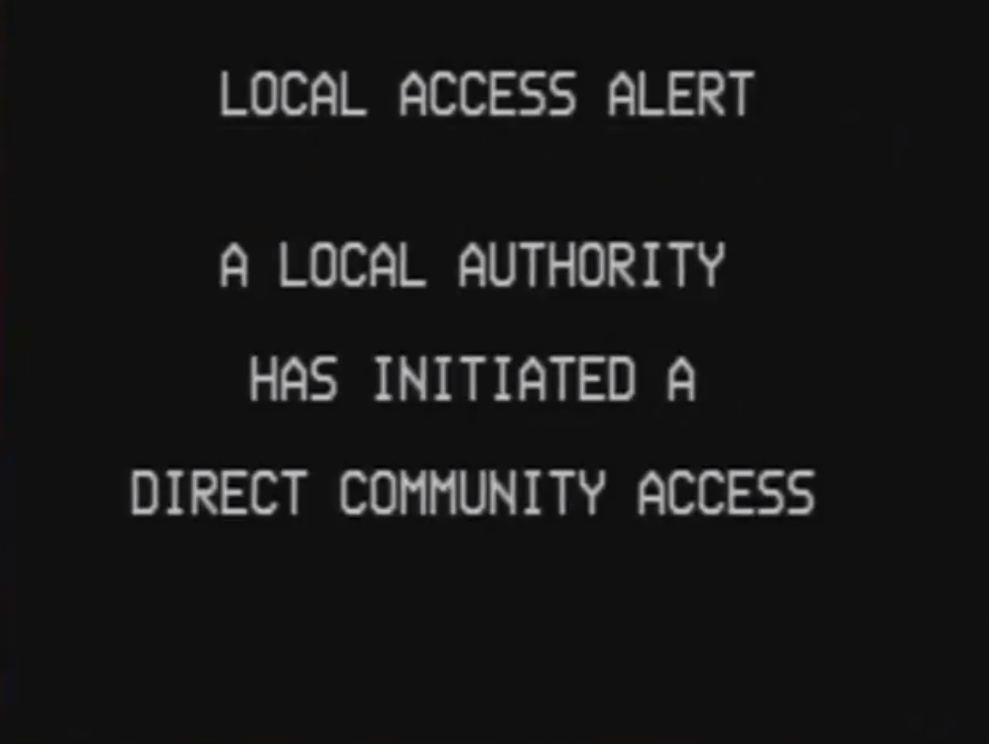
Screen displayed for a modern-day emergency override system activation, using the Trilithic EASyPLUS, c. 2010s

Over time, cities would upgrade their cable override systems. Modern emergency override systems usually use the EASyPLUS by Trilithic (Viavi Solutions), the same one used for the similar Emergency Alert System. With most cable systems having transitioned to digital cable by the mid to late 2010s, most emergency override systems have been largely replaced with the Emergency Alert System, which employs Specific Area Message Encoding technology to activate for potential disasters and deactivate to resume cable broadcasts, especially late at night when many public servants aren't available to break in.

== Operational details ==
The activation of an emergency override system is initiated, typically by local law enforcement or other emergency management staff, by dialing a number and entering a PIN through a designated telephone. Once correctly entered, programming on all channels for cable subscribers in the area is interrupted. The extent of how programming is affected varies from system to system, with some merely overriding the audio feed while others additionally remove the video feed and may replace it with static or a generated slide. The operator then delivers a live, spoken message informing viewers of the nature of the override, including giving any advised actions for emergencies, before they dial out to end the override.

Emergency override systems could also be activated by other entities. For example, in 1997, Union Pacific developed in coordination with the Roseville Fire Department a local warning system that was intended to warn neighborhoods in Roseville, California near railroads, of hazardous waste spills. Union Pacific would warn the Roseville Fire Department of a spillage, and, if the incident was severe enough, part of this local warning system would interrupt cable television with a blue screen and a taped message providing warning of an incident and evacuation.

=== System tests ===
Emergency override systems are typically tested once weekly at randomly selected times, as well as scheduled monthly tests and yearly tornado drills, but it depended on the city.
