= Darrell M. Trent =

Darrell Trent

Director of the Office of Emergency Preparedness
- Acting
- In office January 20, 1973 – July 1, 1973
- President: Richard Nixon
- Preceded by: George Lincoln
- Succeeded by: James Hafer (1975)

Personal details
- Born: 1938 (age 87–88)
- Party: Republican
- Education: Stanford University (BA); Columbia University (MS)

Darrell M. Trent (born 1938) was United States Deputy Secretary of Transportation from 1981 to 1983. Prior to this appointment, he served as deputy campaign manager of the Ronald Reagan 1980 presidential campaign and as associate director of the Hoover Institution. After leaving office as deputy transportation secretary, he served as CEO of Rollins Environmental Services and, in 1987, was appointed to the board of directors of Amtrak.

Trent graduated from Stanford University with a Bachelor of Arts and received a Master of Science from Columbia University.

Political offices
Preceded by George Lincoln	Director of the Office of Emergency Preparedness; Acting; 1973	Vacant Title next held by James Hafer; 1975
