= Duck and Cover (film) =

1952 American civil defense film

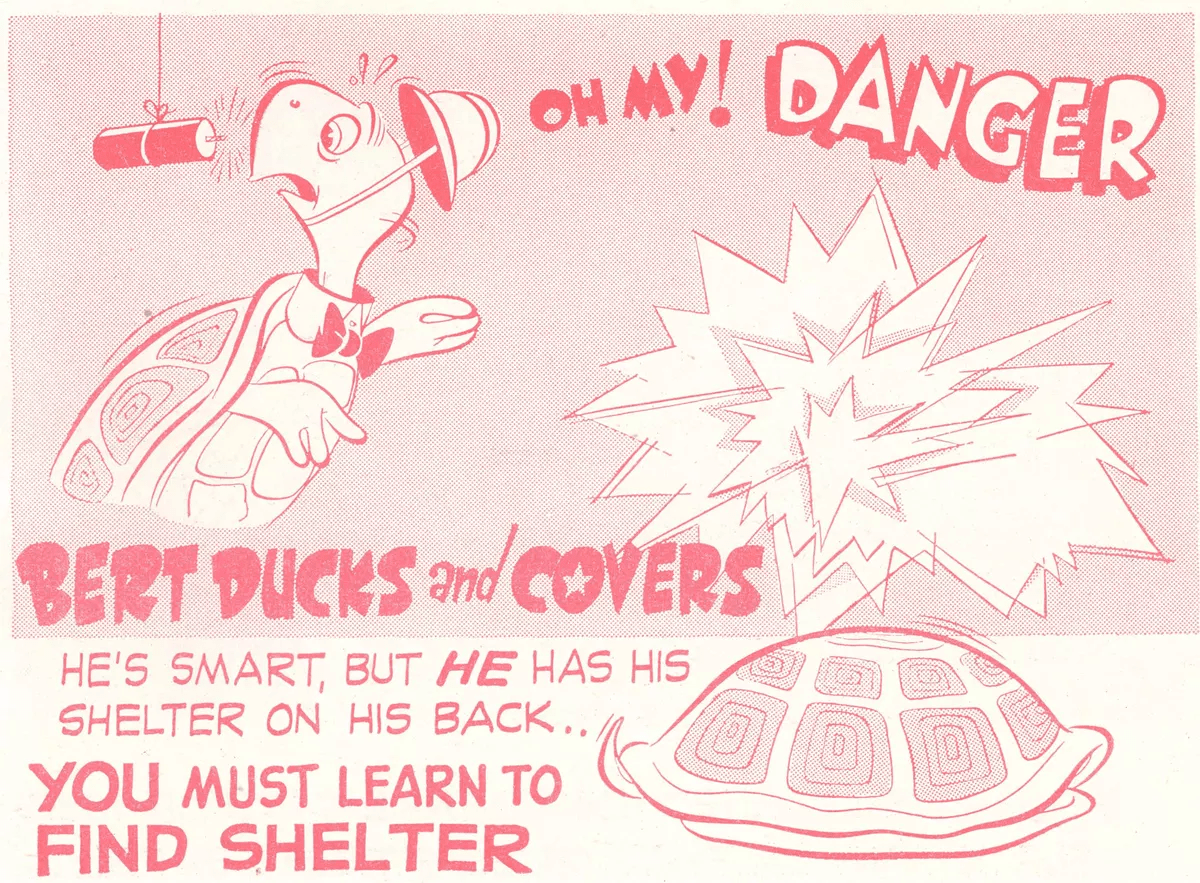
- Theatrical release poster
- Directed by: Anthony Rizzo
- Written by: Raymond J. Mauer
- Produced by: John Sutherland
- Narrated by: Robert Middleton
- Cinematography: Drummond Drury
- Distributed by: Archer Productions
- Release date: 1952
- Running time: 9 min 15 sec
- Country: United States
- Language: English

Duck and Cover is a 1952 American civil defense animated and live action social guidance film that is often characterized as propaganda. It has similar themes to the more adult-oriented civil defense training films. It was widely distributed to United States schoolchildren in the 1950s, and teaches students what to do in the event of a nuclear explosion.

The film was funded by the US Federal Civil Defense Administration and released in January 1952. At the time, the Soviet Union was engaged in nuclear testing and the US was in the midst of the Korean War. It was written by Raymond J. Mauer, directed by Anthony Rizzo of Archer Productions, narrated by actor Robert Middleton, and made with help from schoolchildren from New York City and Astoria, New York.

The film is in the public domain and widely available through Internet sources such as YouTube, as well as on DVD. It was screened on Turner Classic Movies' Saturday night–Sunday morning film showcase series, TCM Underground.

In 2004, the film was selected for preservation in the United States National Film Registry by the Library of Congress for being "culturally, historically, or aesthetically significant."

== Plot ==
Full film from the Library of Congress

The film starts with an animated sequence, showing Bert, an anthropomorphic turtle walking down a road while picking up a flower and smelling it. A chorus sings the Duck and Cover theme:

There was a turtle by the name of Bert,
and Bert the turtle was very alert.
When danger threatened him he never got hurt,
he knew just what to do:
He'd duck and cover!
Duck and cover!
He did what we all must learn to do
You, and you, and you, and you
Duck and cover!

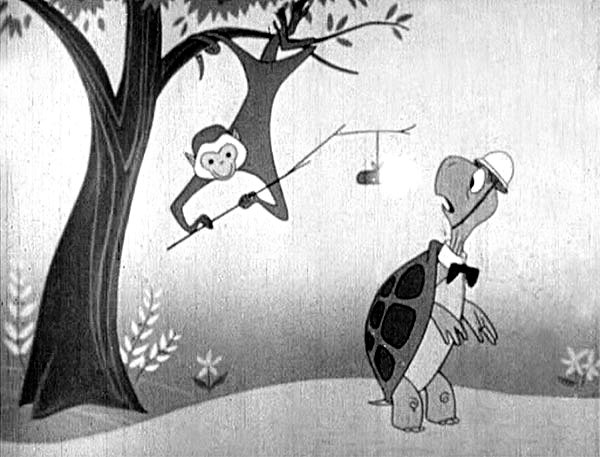
A frame from the film, where Bert reacts to the threat of the firecracker

Bert is shown being attacked by a monkey holding a lit firecracker or stick of dynamite on the end of a string. Bert ducks into his shell as the charge goes off; it destroys both the monkey and the tree in which he is sitting, but Bert is left unharmed.

The film then switches to live footage, as narrator Middleton explains what children should do "when you see the flash" of an atomic bomb. It is suggested that by ducking down low in the event of a nuclear explosion, such as crawling under desks, children would be safer than they would be standing. It also explains some basic survival tactics, such as facing a wall that might lend protection.

The last scene of the film returns to animation, in which Bert the Turtle (voiced by Carl Ritchie) summarily asks what everybody should do in the event of an atomic bomb flash, before being given the correct answer by a group of unseen children.

== Cast ==
- Leo M. Langlois III as Tony (uncredited)
- Ray J. Mauer as Civil Defense Worker (uncredited)
- Carl Ritchie as Bert (voice) (uncredited)
- George Winslow as Student (uncredited)

== Purpose ==
After nuclear weapons were developed, with Trinity having been the first nuclear weapon to be developed through the Manhattan Project during World War II, the danger they posed soon became clear. The United States held a nuclear monopoly from the end of World War II until 1949, when the Soviets detonated their first nuclear device.

Soon after, the nuclear stage of the Cold War began; as a result, strategies for survival were thought out. Fallout shelters, both private and public, were built, but the government deemed it necessary to teach citizens about the danger of atomic and hydrogen bombs and give them training to prepare them to act in the event of a nuclear strike.

The solution was the duck and cover campaign, which Duck and Cover was an integral part of. Shelters were built, drills were held in towns and schools, and the film was shown to schoolchildren. According to the United States Library of Congress, which declared the film "historically significant" and inducted it for preservation into the National Film Registry in 2004, it "was seen by millions of schoolchildren in the 1950s."

== Accuracy and usefulness ==
Test shot Nectar of Operation Castle produced a yield of 1.69 megatons. Note the distinctive near instantaneous double flash, with the second being brighter than the sun, and the blast wave slowly, by comparison, spreading out turning the calm Elugelab ocean water a frothy white as it passes. The maximum average nuclear fireball radius is approximately 1.3 to 1.5 km (0.81 to 0.93 mi). The outdoor blast and thermal burn LD50s would be 8 and 12 km respectively.

Detailed scientific research programs lay behind the UK government civil defense pamphlets of the 1950s and 1960s, including the advice to duck and cover. While these kinds of tactics would be useless for those at ground zero during a surface burst nuclear explosion, it would be beneficial to most people, who are positioned away from the blast hypocenter. Scientific analysis has largely supported the general idea of sheltering indoors in response to a nuclear explosion. Staying indoors can leave roads clear for emergency vehicles to access the area. This is known as the shelter in place protocol, and along with emergency evacuation, are recommended as the two countermeasures to take when the direct effects of nuclear explosions are no longer life-threatening and protection is needed from coming in contact with nuclear weapon fallout.

== Historical context ==
Video of shot MET (Military Effects Test) of Operation Teapot, fired on 15 April 1955, with a yield of 22 kilotons, typical of the yield of nuclear weapons when the film was first shown and approximately of the same yield and height of burst as the Fat Man bomb detonated over the city of Nagasaki in 1945

The United States' monopoly on nuclear weapons was broken by the Soviet Union in 1949 when it tested its first nuclear explosive (Joe-1), causing many in the US government and public to realize that the nation was more vulnerable than before. Duck-and-cover exercises quickly became a part of Civil Defense drills that every American citizen, from children to the elderly, practiced to be ready in the event of nuclear war. In 1950, during the first big Civil Defense push of the Cold War and coinciding with the Alert America! initiative to educate Americans on nuclear preparedness, the adult-oriented Survival Under Atomic Attack was published, containing "duck and cover" advice in its Six Survival Secrets For Atomic Attacks section. 1. Try To Get Shielded 2. Drop Flat On Ground Or Floor 3. Bury Your Face In Your Arms ("crook of your elbow"). The child-oriented film Duck and Cover was produced a year later, in 1951, by the Federal Civil Defense Administration.

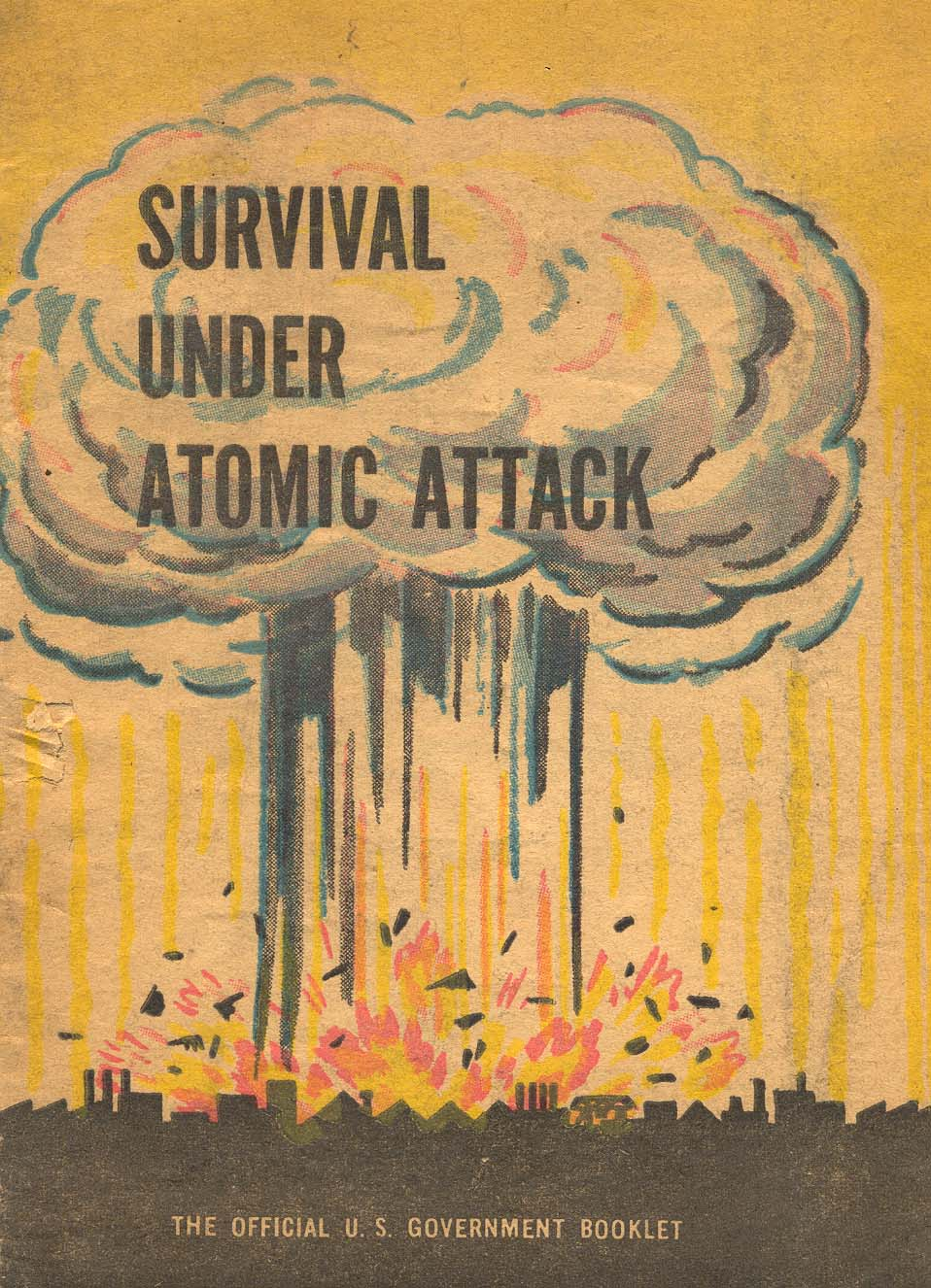
The adult-oriented Survival Under Atomic Attack issued in 1950, pre-dated the release of Duck and Cover in 1951–52. The Booklet was accompanied by a companion film by the same name.

Education efforts on the effects of nuclear weapons proceeded with stops-and-starts in the US due to competing alternatives. In a once classified war game that examined varying levels of war escalation, warning, and pre-emptive attacks in the late 1950s to early 1960s, it was estimated that approximately 27 million US citizens would have been saved with civil defense education. However, at the time the cost of a full-scale civil defense program was regarded as less effective and less cost-efficient than a ballistic missile defense (Nike Zeus) system. As the Soviets were believed to be rapidly increasing their nuclear stockpile, the efficacy of both would begin to enter a diminishing returns trend. When more became known about the cost and limitations of the Nike Zeus system, in the early 1960s the head of the Department of Defense determined once more that fallout shelters would save more Americans for less money.

The production of Duck and Cover in 1951 by the Federal Civil Defense Administration occurred during the height of the Korean War (1950–1953) and coincided with the first Desert Rock exercises in the Nevada desert, which were designed to familiarize the US military with fighting alongside battlefield nuclear weapons. It was feared that a resolution to the Korean War might require the theater of operations to first expand across the border into the People's Republic of China and nuclear weapons to end it.

== Legacy ==
The film and its song are parodied in the film The Iron Giant (1999).

A sample of this film is used at the start of Captain A-Bomb by Irish indie band Fight Like Apes.

== See also ==
- Duck and cover, for further discussion of this method of self-defense.
- List of films about nuclear issues
- List of films in the public domain in the United States
- Civil Defence Information Bulletin, a 1964 British film which deals with the same topic.
- Our Cities Must Fight, a 1951 film civil defense film also by Archer Productions.
- Protect and Survive, a 1970s–80s British information film on the same topic.
