= George Lincoln =

American military leader (1907–1975)

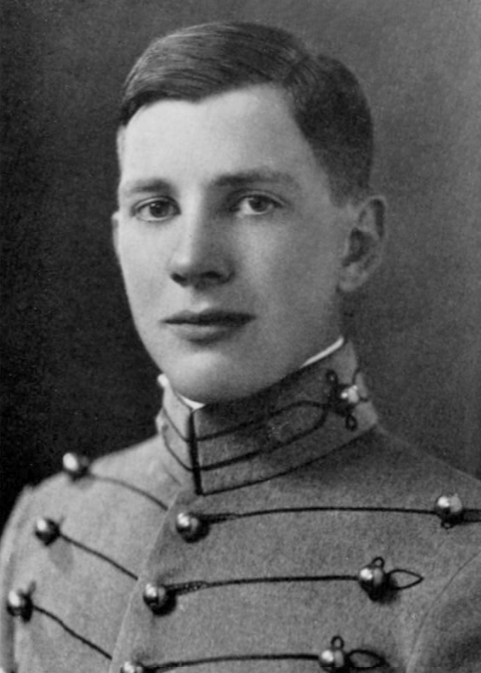

Director of the Office of Emergency Preparedness
- In office January 29, 1969 – January 20, 1973
- President: Richard Nixon
- Preceded by: Price Daniel
- Succeeded by: Darrell Trent (acting)

Personal details
- Born: George Arthur Lincoln; July 20, 1907 near Harbor Beach, Michigan, U.S.
- Died: May 24, 1975 (aged 67) Colorado Springs, Colorado, U.S.
- Education: University of Kansas (attended); United States Military Academy (BS); Magdalen College, Oxford (attended)

George Arthur Lincoln (July 20, 1907 – May 24, 1975) was an American military leader who served as a top general staff strategist in the United States Army during World War II. He was the principal planner of the military campaigns of George C. Marshall in Europe and Asia, including the planned invasion of Japan.

== Early life and education ==
Lincoln was born on July 20, 1907, on a farm outside of Harbor Beach, Michigan. In 1924, he attended the University of Kansas for one year. In 1925, he transferred to the United States Military Academy, graduating fourth in his class of 1929. He received a Rhodes scholarship to the University of Oxford to study philosophy, politics, and economics at Magdalen College.

== Career ==
After University, Lincoln was placed by the army in Colorado. He then moved to West Point, where he worked as an instructor.

From 1941 to 1942, Lincoln was an executive officer of a combat engineering unit in Europe during World War II. In the spring of 1943, he was sent to Washington to serve as the deputy chief of the Army's Strategy and Policy Group in the Pentagon. There, he became a close adviser and the principal strategic planner for General George C. Marshall and, at the end of the war, assisted in the drafting of the Japanese Instrument of Surrender, which was signed on September 2, 1945. Marshall would go on to award him the Distinguished Service Medal for "planning and negotiating worldwide military operations and for reconciling the logistical and strategic factors of the war." He continued on as a planner when Dwight D. Eisenhower became the Army Chief of Staff. He assisted in the establishment of the new Department of Defense.

In 1947, Lincoln returned to West Point as a social science teacher. In 1948, Lincoln served as Deputy Under Secretary of the Army. In 1949, he was a special assistant to the Secretary of Defense, where he would help draft what would become the Mutual Security Act. In 1950, he was part of the American delegation to the committee that established NATO.

In the aftermath of the Korean War, Lincoln became known as "the man who drew the 38th parallel, the line that determined the Korean Demilitarized Zone." After the war, he returned to West Point to teach. During that time, he would often assist with matters related to government strategy.

In 1964, Lincoln surveyed American aid missions in Latin America as a special adviser for the Agency for International Development. He retired from West Point in 1969.

In 1969, President Nixon appointed Lincoln as director of the Office of Emergency Preparedness, the agency responsible for emergency preparation, the mobilization of federal resources, and the coordination of state and local emergency operations. His appointment broke the tradition of choosing a political or public figure. In August 1969, Lincoln led the federal government's response to damage caused by Hurricane Camille on the Gulf Coast of Louisiana and Mississippi.

In August 1971, Lincoln oversaw a 90‐day wage‐price freeze announced by President Nixon.

=== COIN ===
Lincoln developed the Army's thinking around counterinsurgency conflict, known as COIN. He believed that military leaders post World War II needed to be "very broad-gauged individuals”. His students who embraced his philosophy were mockingly called the "Lincoln Brigade", referencing the leftist-leaning American volunteers who fought in the Spanish Civil War. David Petraeus would follow a COIN approach in his efforts in Iraq, where it found some success, and in Afghanistan, where it did not.

== Personal life ==
Lincoln was married to Frederica Bellamy. Together, they had four children. The family had a ranch outside of Denver, Colorado, where Lincoln liked to spend time "mending fences, attending cattle, and riding."

Lincoln died while on a horseback riding vacation at Colorado Springs on May 24, 1975, aged 67.

Political offices
Preceded by Price Daniel	Director of the Office of Emergency Preparedness; 1969–1973	Succeeded by Darrell Trent; Acting
