= Executive Order 13603 =

2012 American order on national defense

The National Defense Resources Preparedness executive order (Executive Order 13603) is an order of the President of the United States, signed by President Barack Obama on March 16, 2012. The purpose of this executive order is to delegate authority and address national defense resource policies and programs under the Defense Production Act of 1950. Executive Order 13603 provides the framework and authority for the allocation or appropriation of resources, materials, and services to promote national defense.

A number of viral emails claimed that the executive order "creates martial law." Similar claims were repeated by Texas congresswoman Kay Granger of Texas in a constituent newsletter; she later retracted her statements. In reality, the order updated long-existing directives that have been issued ever since the Truman administration. Such presidential directives update the resources covered under the Defense Production Act, which was enacted in the 1950s and is reauthorized by Congress every few years. The act "allows presidents to delegate authority to various federal departments and agencies. For example, Obama's order authorizes the secretaries of Defense and the Interior 'to encourage the exploration, development, and mining of strategic and critical materials and other materials.'" The fact-checking website Snopes.com noted:

"Despite claims that the executive order provided the President with unprecedented new powers such as declaring martial law, seizing private property, implementing the rationing of food, gasoline, and drugs, restarting peacetime conscription, and nationalizing American industry, merely by declaring a national emergency, the National Defense Resources Preparedness EO issued by President Obama was simply a minor updating of a similar order issued by President Bill Clinton in 1994 (which itself had decades-old predecessors) and amended several times since."

In particular, this executive order removes the name of the Federal Emergency Management Agency from previous orders, and replaces it with references to branches of the Department of Homeland Security, in order to bring the previous orders up to date with changes in the structure of the Federal Government.
