= Executive Order 11921 =

United States executive order

Executive Order 11921 was an executive order approved by President of the United States Gerald Ford on June 11, 1976. It amends Executive Order 11490 of October 28, 1969, which calls for federal agencies to prepare plans for a state of emergency that would require "over-all civilian manpower mobilization programs" and related emergency measures.
