= Federal Civil Defense Administration =

United States government agency

Agency overview
- Formed: November 1, 1950; 75 years ago
- Preceding agency: Office of Civilian Defense
- Dissolved: 1958; 68 years ago
- Superseding agency: Office of Civil and Defense Mobilization
- Jurisdiction: Federal government of the United States
- Headquarters: Washington, D.C.
- Key document: Executive Order 10186

The Federal Civil Defense Administration (FCDA) was organized by President Harry S. Truman on December 1, 1950, through Executive Order 10186, and became an official government agency via the Federal Civil Defense Act of 1950 on 12 January 1951. In 1958 the FCDA was superseded by the Office of Civil and Defense Mobilization when President Dwight D. Eisenhower merged the FCDA with the Office of Defense Mobilization.

In its early years, the agency focused on evacuation as a strategy. The FCDA also sponsored or co-produced short social guidance films about civil defense, including Survival Under Atomic Attack, Our Cities Must Fight, and Duck and Cover.

The FCDA was first headed by Millard Caldwell under Truman, then Val Peterson under Eisenhower.

== Background ==
The predecessor to the FCDA, the Office of Civilian Defense was abolished in June 1945 with the end of World War II. In the period between the end of the World War and 1949, when the Soviet Union detonated their first atomic weapon, little was given to the topic of civil defense. After the Soviets demonstration of their first atomic weapon there was a feeling of the need to do something throughout both the American public and government. This led to, among many actions, the creation of the Federal Civil Defense Administration by President Harry S. Truman in 1950.

== Administrators ==
Denotes acting capacity.

Name	Start	End	President
Millard Caldwell	December 1, 1950	November 15, 1952	Harry S. Truman (1945–1953)
Jerry Wadsworth; Acting	November 15, 1952	February 19, 1953	Harry S. Truman (1945–1953)
Val Peterson	February 20, 1953	March 4, 1953	Dwight D. Eisenhower (1953–1961)
Val Peterson	March 4, 1953	June 14, 1957	Dwight D. Eisenhower (1953–1961)
Lewis Berry; Acting	June 14, 1957	July 19, 1957	Dwight D. Eisenhower (1953–1961)
Leo Hoegh	July 19, 1957	July 1, 1958	Dwight D. Eisenhower (1953–1961)

== See also ==
- Federal Civil Defense Authority
- United States civil defense
- CONELRAD
