= Federal Civil Defense Authority =

Defunct civil defense agency

The FCDA logo

The Federal Civil Defense Authority was established in the United States Department of Defense (DOD), by DOD Directive 5105.43, May 5, 1972.

== Predecessor agencies ==
Office of Civil Defense Drinking Water Container

- Federal Civil Defense Administration (FCDA), Office for Emergency Management (OEM), Executive Office of the President (EOP, 1950–1951)
- FCDA (1951–1958)
- Office of Defense and Civilian Mobilization (ODCM), EOP (1958)
- Office of Civil and Defense Mobilization (OCDM), EOP (1958–1961)
- Office of Civil Defense (OCD), DOD (1961–1964)
- OCD, United States Department of the Army, DOD (1964–1972)

== Functions ==
It coordinated and directed federal, state, and local civil defense program activities, including fallout shelters; chemical, biological, and radiological warfare defense; emergency communications and warning systems; post-attack assistance and damage assessment; preparedness planning; and government continuity.

== Abolished ==
By EO 12148, July 20, 1979, retroactive to July 15, 1979, pursuant to Reorganization Plan No. 3 of 1978, effective April 1, 1979.

== Successor agencies ==
- Federal Emergency Management Agency (FEMA).

== See also ==
- Federal Civil Defense Administration
