= Our Cities Must Fight =

1951 civil defense film

- Production company: Archer Productions
- Release date: 1951
- Running time: 10 minutes
- Country: United States
- Language: English

Our Cities Must Fight is a 1951 American short civil defense film produced by Archer Productions and sponsored by the US Federal Civil Defense Administration (FCDA). The film implores American citizens to not flee from cities in the event of a nuclear attack, utilizing stock footage alongside filmed segments of two men having a conversation in an office.

Our Cities Must Fight was one of three films, alongside Survival Under Atomic Attack (1951) and Duck and Cover (1952), outlined in a December 11, 1950, memorandum by the FDCA, ten days after the FDCA's creation by US President Harry S. Truman via executive order; both Our Cities Must Fight and Duck and Cover were produced by Archer Productions.
