= Ben Sliney =

American lawyer and air traffic controller

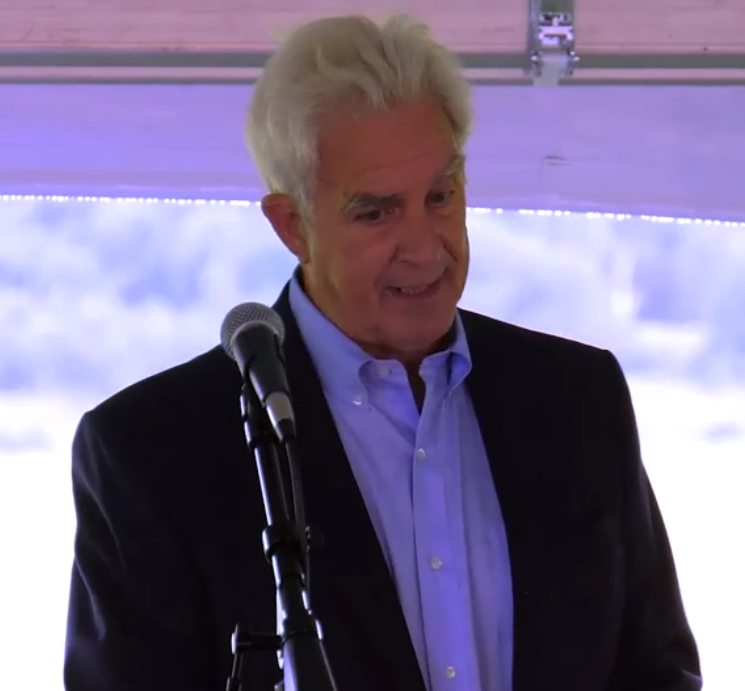
- Sliney in 2021
- Born: Benedict L. Sliney; October 12, 1945 (age 80); Medford, Massachusetts, U.S.
- Education: Dowling College (BS); St. John's University School of Law (JD)
- Occupations: Air traffic controller and lawyer
- Known for: FAA National Operations Manager during the September 11 attacks who ordered closure of U.S. air space.
- Spouse: Irene Lynch Ahern (m. 1966)

Benedict L. Sliney (born October 12, 1945) is an American retired lawyer, air traffic controller, and former Federal Aviation Administration (FAA) National Operations Manager. His first day in this position was on September 11, 2001, and he was responsible for ordering a national ground stop across United States airspace in response to the September 11 attacks.

== Biography ==
Benedict Sliney was born on October 12, 1945, in Medford, Massachusetts. He graduated from Hope High School in Providence, Rhode Island in 1963.

He joined the United States Air Force from 1964 to 1968 and received training as an air traffic controller. He married Irene Lynch Ahern in 1966.

He began with the Federal Aviation Administration in 1969, working at several air traffic control stations in the New York area. He briefly served as Airspace Branch Manager at the FAA Eastern Region headquarters.

He received his Bachelor of Science from Dowling College in 1974, and received his J.D. degree from St. John's University Law School in 1978. He left the FAA in 1982 to practice law full-time in New York State. He retired from law practice in July 2000 and rejoined the FAA at the Command Center.

== Actions on September 11, 2001 ==
After American Airlines Flight 11 and United Airlines Flight 175 crashed into the twin towers of the World Trade Center and American Airlines Flight 77 hit the Pentagon, Sliney gave the order to land every plane in the air over the US at the time (implementing the SCATANA plan), effectively shutting down US airspace. There were roughly 4,200 aircraft in flight. This was an unprecedented act, which the 9/11 Commission later denoted as an important and decisive moment in that morning's chaos. While Sliney decided on his initiative, he had the advice of an experienced staff of air traffic controllers and traffic managers.

== Personal life ==
Sliney is married with three children. As of 2018, he is retired and lives in Sandwich, Massachusetts.

== Portrayals in films and television ==
Sliney was initially involved in the 2006 film United 93 in an advisory role. He was then cast in a small role as an air traffic controller. Later, the film's writer and director, Paul Greengrass, offered him the opportunity to play himself, which he accepted. Sliney also had a small role in Greengrass's 2010 film Green Zone. He also took part in the documentary Seconds from Disaster.
