= Executive Order 11490 =

1969 United States executive order

- Assigning Emergency Preparedness Functions to Federal Departments and Agencies
- Type: Executive order
- Number: 11490
- President: Richard Nixon
- Signed: October 28, 1969

Federal Register details
- Publication date: October 28, 1969

Summary
- Assigns emergency preparedness functions to federal departments and agencies to ensure continuity of government operations during national emergencies.

Executive Order 11490, titled “Assigning Emergency Preparedness Functions to Federal Departments and Agencies,” was an executive order issued by President Richard Nixon on October 28, 1969. It mandated federal agencies to develop comprehensive plans for maintaining essential functions during national emergencies, including scenarios such as a massive nuclear attack.

== Purpose and scope ==
The primary objective of Executive Order 11490 was to ensure the continuity of government operations across all levels during any conceivable national emergency. It emphasized the necessity for effective national preparedness planning, which involved identifying critical functions, assigning responsibilities for developing implementation plans, and establishing the capability to execute those plans.

== Key provisions ==
The order outlined specific responsibilities for various federal departments and agencies, including:

- Department of State: Develop policies and procedures for conducting foreign relations under emergency conditions.
- Department of Defense: Prepare for national defense and military operations during emergencies.
- Department of the Treasury: Manage financial and monetary systems to ensure economic stability.
- Department of Agriculture: Ensure the availability and distribution of food resources.
- Department of Health, Education, and Welfare: Maintain public health services and educational systems.

Each department was tasked with creating emergency plans pertinent to their functions, such as succession to office, pre-delegation of emergency authority, safeguarding essential records, and establishing emergency relocation sites.

== Implementation and impact ==
The order consolidated and updated previous directives related to emergency preparedness, aiming to create a cohesive national strategy. It also established the Office of Emergency Preparedness as the coordinator of the national preparedness program, ensuring that all federal agencies adhered to the prescribed guidelines.

== Criticism and concerns ==
The economist Howard Ruff criticized the order for granting the president extensive authority, potentially disrupting the balance of powers within the government. He expressed concern that the activation of such powers could lead to dictatorial control, contingent solely upon the president’s discretion to declare a national emergency.

The only thing standing between us and a dictatorship is the good character of the president and the lack of a crisis severe enough that the public would stand still for it.

— Howard Ruff

== Subsequent developments ==
In 2012, the order was consolidated into Executive Order 13603, titled “National Defense Resources Preparedness.” This newer directive aimed to update and integrate the nation’s emergency preparedness framework, reflecting contemporary challenges and organizational changes within the federal government.
