= Emergency Broadcast System =

Former United States emergency warning system

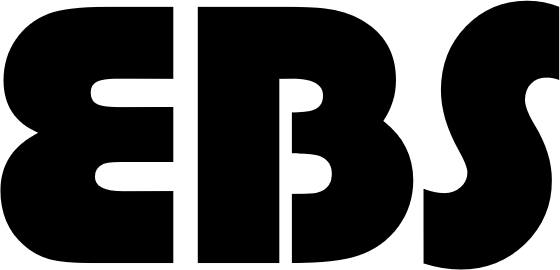
- The Emergency Broadcast System logo from 1976 to 1997, using the Puente font.
- Type: Emergency warning system
- Country: United States
- Broadcast area: Nationwide
- Launch date: 1963 (as Emergency Action Notification System); 1976 (as Emergency Broadcast System)
- Dissolved: 1997
- Replaced: CONELRAD
- Replaced by: Emergency Alert System

The Emergency Broadcast System (EBS), sometimes called the Emergency Action Notification System (EANS), was an emergency warning system used in the United States. It was the most commonly used, along with the Emergency Override system. It replaced the previous CONELRAD system and was used from 1963 to 1997, at which point it was replaced by the Emergency Alert System.

== Purpose ==
The system was established to provide the president of the United States with an expeditious method of communicating with the American public in the event of war, threat of war, or grave national crisis. It was modeled after Civ-Alert, an emergency warning system in Hawaii. The Emergency Broadcast System replaced CONELRAD on August 5, 1963. In later years, it was expanded for use during peacetime emergencies at the state and local levels.

Although the system was never used for a national emergency, it was activated more than 20,000 times between 1976 and 1996 to broadcast civil emergency messages and warnings of severe weather hazards.

== National level EBS ==
An order to activate the EBS at the national level would have originated with the president and been relayed via the White House Communications Agency duty officer to one of two origination points – either the Aerospace Defense Command (ADC) or the Federal Preparedness Agency (FPA) – as the system stood in 1978. Participating telecommunications common carriers, radio and television networks, the Associated Press, and United Press International would receive and authenticate (by means of code words) an Emergency Action Notification (EAN) via a teletypewriter network designed specifically for this purpose. These recipients would relay the EAN to their subscribers and affiliates.

Enemy attack or nuclear attack warning procedures under EBS changed with time. In 2024, the United States National Archives made available prerecorded messages dating to 1972 that were intended to be played during a national activation of the Emergency Broadcast System. A presidential EBS activation message without attack warning appears at 1:05:55 on side 2 of prerecorded tape number 027:

"The United States Emergency Broadcast System has been activated by direction of the President of the United States because of a grave national emergency. The Emergency Broadcast System comprises all communications facilities designated and authorized by the Federal Communications Commission to operate during a period of national emergency."

This "grave national emergency" message recording and script above was not in use by individual stations or published in any known FCC document.

The release of the EAN by the Aerospace Defense Command or the Federal Preparedness Agency would initiate a process by which the common carriers would link otherwise independent networks such as ABC, CBS, and NBC into a single national network from which even independent stations could receive programming. "Broadcast stations would have used the 2-tone Attention Signal on their assigned broadcast frequency to alert other broadcast stations to stand by for a message from the president." The transmission of programming on a broadcast station's assigned frequency, and the fact that television networks/stations and FM radio stations could participate, distinguished EBS from CONELRAD. EBS radio stations would not necessarily transmit on 640 or 1240 on the AM dial, and FM radio and television would carry the same audio program as AM radio stations did.

== Activation procedure ==
Actual activations originated with a primary station known as a Common Program Control Station (CPCS-1), which would transmit the Attention Signal. The Attention Signal most commonly associated with the system was a combination of the sine waves of 853 and 960 Hz‍—‌suited to attract attention due to its unpleasantness. Decoders at relay stations would sound an alarm, alerting station personnel to the incoming message. Then, each relay station would broadcast the alert tone and rebroadcast the emergency message from the primary station. The Attention Signal was developed in the mid-1960s.

A nationwide activation of the EBS was called an Emergency Action Notification (EAN) and was the only activation that stations were not allowed to ignore; the Federal Communications Commission made local civil emergencies and weather advisories optional (except for stations that agreed to be the "primary" source of such messages).

To activate the EAN protocol, the Associated Press and United Press International wire services would notify stations with a special message. It began with a full line of X's, and a bell inside the Teletype machine would sound ten times. To avoid abuse and mistakes, the message included a confirmation password which changed daily. Stations that subscribed to one of the wire services were not required to activate the EBS if the activation message did not have proper confirmation.

=== False alarm of 1971 ===
A properly authenticated Emergency Action Notification was incorrectly sent to United States broadcast stations at 9:33 a.m. Eastern Standard Time on February 20, 1971. At the usual time a weekly EAN test was performed, teletype operator W.S. Eberhart had three tapes in front of him: a test tape, and two tapes indicating a real emergency, instructing the use of EAN Message #1, and #2, respectively. He inadvertently used the wrong tape, which used an unexpected codeword, "HATEFULNESS". The message ordered stations to cease regular programming immediately and begin an Emergency Action Notification using Message #1. Message 1 stated that regular programming had been interrupted at the request of the United States government but was not specific about the cause. A cancellation message was sent at 9:59 a.m. EST, but it used the same codeword as the original message. A cancellation message with the correct codeword was not sent until 10:13 a.m. EST. After 40 minutes and six incorrect or improperly formatted cancellation messages, the accidental activation was officially terminated.

This false alarm demonstrated major flaws in the practical implementation of an EAN. Many stations didn't receive the alert but more importantly, those that did either ignored it (convinced it was false because it came at the time of a scheduled test), canceled the EAN prematurely with or without any coded indication that the alert was erroneous, or didn't have EAN procedure documents readily accessible to them, so they had no indication of what to do. It is estimated that only 20% of the stations that received the activation followed the procedures completely. Several stations went off the air, as they were instructed to do. Recordings from stations that did not (and are not supposed to, according to EAN procedures) include one from WOWO in Fort Wayne, Indiana, for which a recording of the EAN activation exists.

This false alarm was sufficiently disruptive to move the FCC to temporarily suspend the use and testing of Emergency Action Notifications (EANs) by codeword effective February 25, 1971. In the meantime, a national EBS activation (actual or test) would be routed through news service broadcast desks, then authenticated with the White House communications center, introducing a delay of approximately one minute. Numerous investigations were launched and several changes were made to the EBS. Among them, EAN Message #2, which contains specific language indicating an imminent attack, was eliminated. Another change was moving the tapes for genuine alerts away from the broadcasting machines to prevent them from being mistaken for the weekly test tapes. After numerous safeguards were put in place, the FCC voted to resume automatic national activation of the EBS using EANs in mid-December 1972, almost 20 months after they were suspended.

A United States Emergency Broadcast System prerecorded announcement for presidential EBS activation without attack warning did exist, and it could have been distributed from national activation points (such as Federal Preparedness Agency) to radio and TV stations. No such distribution occurred in the 1971 incident, underscoring its falsity.

Following the 1971 incident, FCC publications ultimately removed Message 2 attack warning functions from EBS. FEMA nevertheless confidentially retained EBS attack warning capabilities into the Reagan presidency. Adding somewhat to the confusion, the confidential plan called for distributing prerecorded warning messages through Priority Four channels; in other words, not via any of the published FCC plans cited elsewhere here.

Citations to this confidential plan presently remain limited to a 1981 Reagan White House memo and the actual recorded attack warning announcement itself.

== System uses ==
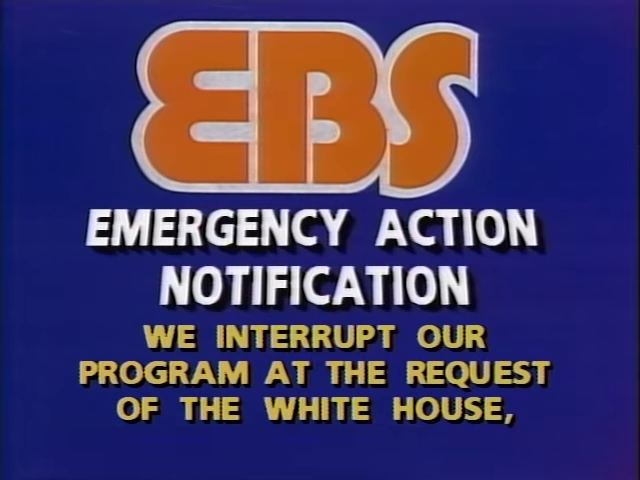
Video slide from a prerecorded announcement of the stand-by script of an EAN from WGN-TV, Chicago, in 1985, during the period of the Emergency Broadcast System. This EAN announcement was never seen on the airwaves of WGN-TV itself, but was posted to YouTube in March 2017.

One of the final logos of the Emergency Broadcast System, as seen during a test conducted by WHO-TV in Des Moines, Iowa, c. Late 1996

Though it was never used, the FCC's EBS plan involved detailed procedures for stations to follow during an EAN. It included precise scripts that announcers were to read at the outset of the emergency, as well as whenever detailed information was scarce. Among other things, citizens were instructed not to use the telephone, but rather continue listening to broadcast stations for information.

"The Emergency Broadcast System will carry presidential messages from the National Command Post as they are broadcast. Locally programmed broadcasts from the Emergency Broadcast System will provide you with news of the situation and emergency instructions for your area."

As late as 1981, the Emergency Broadcast System was capable of carrying messages pertaining to both immediate threats of nuclear attack and messages from the President of the United States. In the event of a national emergency, the White House Press Secretary would be expected to report to the FEMA Special Facility at Mount Weather and order the playing of prerecorded messages. These tapes contained scripted attack warnings, recorded siren sounds and other emergency information for use in the event of nuclear war.

As official information began to emerge from various sources, non-primary stations were to broadcast it according to the following priority list:

- Messages from the president of the United States
- Statewide emergency information
- Local emergency information (for a station's operational area, i.e. evacuation and sheltering plans, and severe weather)
- National programming and news (other than a presidential message)

A presidential message was always required to be aired live during an EAN. For other information, stations were to follow the priority list to decide what should be disseminated first. Lower priority official programming - such as an address by a State Governor - was to be recorded for the earliest available rebroadcast unless it were to be an "unusually long" message, in which case it would be carried live.

Participation in EAN emergency broadcasting was done with the "voluntary cooperation" of each station (as noted in the classic test announcement). Stations that were not prepared to be part of the national EBS network were classified as "non-participating" by the FCC. During an EAN, a non-participating station was required to advise listeners/viewers to tune elsewhere to find emergency bulletins. The station's transmitter would then be turned off. Non-participating stations had to remain off the air until the EAN was terminated. Under no circumstances could any broadcast station continue with normal programming during a national emergency.

"All stations not authorized to remain on the air as part of the United States Emergency Broadcast System have been instructed to go off the air."

Since FCC rules prohibited unofficial or non-governmental news, information, or entertainment programming during EBS operations, the federal government established a newsroom at Mount Weather. President Gerald Ford's White House Press Secretary, Ron Nessen, confirmed the existence of the news center in his book: "I was shown the president's office and living quarters, my office, and facilities for a small number of reporters who would be evacuated with the president."

== Testing the system ==
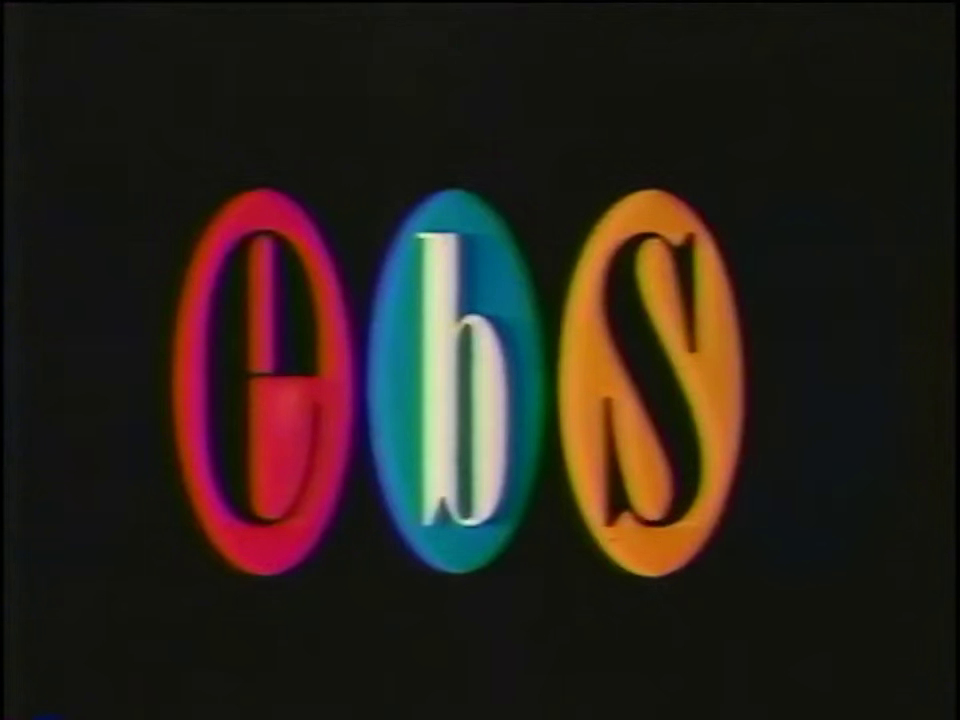
Many stations used a slide similar to this one, when running tests of the system. This slide was seen on KSTP-TV.

Until the system was suspended, radio and television stations were required to perform a Weekly Transmission Test of the Attention Signal and Test Script randomly between 8:30 a.m. and local sunset. Stations were required to perform the test at least once a week, and were only exempt from doing so if they had activated the EBS for a state or local emergency, or participated in a coordinated state or local EBS test, during the past week. Additionally, stations were required to log tests they received from each station they monitored for EBS messages. This served as an additional check, as these stations could expect to hear a weekly test from each source. Failure to receive a signal at least once a week meant that either the monitored station was having a problem transmitting the alert signal or the monitoring station was having a problem receiving it.

=== Test procedure ===
==== Opening announcement ====
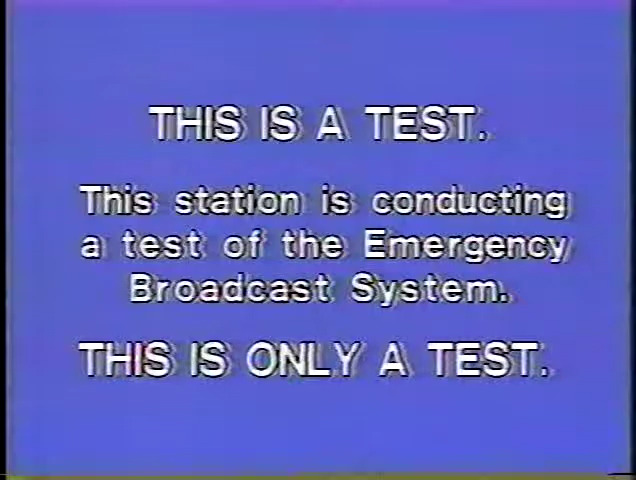
Emergency Broadcast System test message on KPTV Portland, 1988

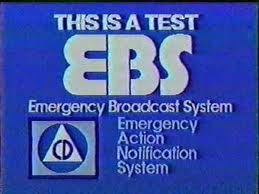
Video slide used by KEYC-TV in Mankato, Minnesota to announce an EBS test, c. 1990

First, normal programming was suspended, though tests were typically conducted during commercial breaks for continuity reasons. Television stations would transmit a video slide such as those seen throughout this article; numerous designs were available or used over the years. Some stations even had multiple slides that they used for their tests in rotation, one for the opening announcement, another for the attention signal transmission, and another for the closing announcement. One of the following announcements was transmitted:

- "This is a test. For the next sixty (or thirty) seconds, this station will conduct a test of the Emergency Broadcast System. This is only a test."
- "This is a test. For the next minute, this station will conduct a test of the Emergency Broadcast System. This is only a test." (used on some stations)
- "(Name of Host Station in a particular market) is conducting a test of the Emergency Broadcast System. This is only a test." (mainly radio stations used this particular announcement)
- "This is a test. (Name of Host Station) is conducting a test of the Emergency Broadcast System. This is only a test."
- "This is a test. Stations (Name of Host Station and Name of Host Station, for example: WWTV and WWUP-TV) are conducting a test of the Emergency Broadcast System. This is only a test." (used partially by two stations serving in one market)
- "This is a test. This station is conducting a test of the Emergency Broadcast System. This is only a test."
- "This is a test of the Emergency Broadcast System. This is only a test."
- "The following is a test of the Emergency Broadcast System."
- "This is a test of the Emergency Broadcast System. Important information will follow this tone."

Alternatively, the name "Emergency Broadcasting System" or "Emergency Action Notification System" could be used.

==== Attention Signal ====
Next, the Attention Signal was transmitted. Prior to 1976, primary stations would turn their transmitters off for five seconds, back on for five seconds, off for five seconds more, then go back on air and transmit a 1000 Hz tone for 15 seconds to alert secondary stations, as was used by predecessor CONELRAD. Television stations adhered to similar rules, but switched only their sound carriers off. This quick off-and-on became known to broadcast engineers as the "EBS Stress Test", as older transmitters would sometimes fail after the quick cycling on and off.

Starting in 1976, the two-tone Attention Signal (853 Hz and 960 Hz) was implemented, replacing the 1000 Hz tone and eliminating the need to switch the transmitter on and off. From 1976 to 1995, stations were required to broadcast the Attention Signal from the EBS encoder for 20 to 25 seconds; in mid-1995, a new rule was put in place that gave stations the option to transmit the attention signal for anywhere from eight to 25 seconds. Noncommercial educational FM radio stations operating at 10 watts or less and low-powered TV stations were exempt from transmitting the Attention Signal.

==== Mid-test announcement ====
Third, another announcement was transmitted following the attention signal. The first part read either:

- "This is a test of the Emergency Broadcast System. The broadcasters of your area in voluntary cooperation with the FCC and other authorities (or, in later years, "federal, state and local authorities") have developed this system to keep you informed in the event of an emergency."
- "This is a test of the Emergency Broadcast System. Broadcasters, in cooperation with the FCC and other authorities (or, in later years, "federal, state and local authorities") have developed this system to keep you informed in the event of an emergency."

Some stations began their tests with this first part of the announcement, then proceeded to the Attention Signal, and then continued with the second part of the announcement described below.

Video slide used by WTCN (now known as KARE) in the Twin Cities during an EBS Test, circa 1984

There were a number of variations for the second half of the statement. During the system's early days, stations other than the designated primary station for an operational area were required to shut down in the event of an emergency (reminiscent of the CONELRAD days), and the message was a variation of:

- "If this had been an actual emergency, you would have been instructed to tune in to one of the broadcast stations in your area."
- "If this had been an actual emergency, you would have been instructed where to tune in your area for news and official information."

By the early 1980s, it had become easier for stations to record and relay messages from a primary station, and the risk of hostile bombers using broadcast signals to navigate lessened due to the development of ICBMs, as well as more capable on-board navigation systems for crewed aircraft. As a result, the requirement for non-primary stations to shut down during an activation of the system was dropped, and the message became:

- "If this had been an actual emergency, the Attention Signal you just heard would have been followed by official information, news, or instructions."

Stations could also list emergencies that the EBS would potentially be activated for (i.e. tornado warnings, flash flood warnings, hurricane warnings and/or earthquakes); at least two stations - WRTI-AM-FM in Philadelphia and WXYZ-TV in Detroit - infamously made explicit reference to an attack on the United States as being a possible scenario for an EBS activation in their test scripts. In the late 1980s and early 90s, several television stations in the Los Angeles area had specific test scripts that emphasized earthquake preparedness. People living in the Los Angeles area were urged to study an emergency preparedness section in their telephone directories to be prepared for an earthquake or other types of emergencies.

As the EBS was about to be replaced by its successor, the aforementioned Emergency Alert System in the mid-1990s, some stations used the following message:

- "This station is testing its Emergency Broadcast System equipment. The EBS will soon be replaced with the Emergency Alert System; the EAS will provide timely emergency warnings."

==== Conclusion ====
Lastly, the test concluded with one of these phrases:

- "(Name of host station) serves (name of operational area). This concludes this test of the Emergency Broadcast System."
- "Stations of the (name of the station public broadcasting network, for example: South Dakota Public Broadcasting Network) serve all operational areas in (name of state). This concludes this test of the Emergency Broadcast System. (Used mostly by statewide public television and/or radio networks.)
- "This station serves the (name of operational area). This concludes this test of the Emergency Broadcast System."
- "This station serves (name of operational area). This concludes this Emergency Broadcast System Test."
- "This concludes this test of the Emergency Broadcast System serving the (name of operational area)."
- "This concludes this test of the Emergency Broadcast System on (name of station)."

==== Variations ====
Variations of the test script were heard in different parts of the country throughout the years depending on FCC regulations at the time, local preferences, and whether the specific station performing the test was a primary EBS station or not. The announcement text was mandated by the FCC. Stations had the option of either reading the test script live, or using recorded versions. WHEN radio in Syracuse, New York and WGR radio in Buffalo, New York both had a sung version of the most common script. There was also a version done by Los Angeles-based Cheap Radio Thrills, as well as another by the comedy team of Bob and Ray. The FCC declared it illegal to sing the test message, or read it as a joke. However, it was acceptable to read it in another language (for example, French or Spanish), if a station broadcast in a language other than English, as was done on KWEX-TV in San Antonio, Texas. Copies of the warning message script had a note saying that it was acceptable to broadcast in any other language, so long as it was broadcast in English as well.

Additionally, for a time during the 1980s, WFSB in Hartford, Connecticut had a woman appearing onscreen to deliver the opening and closing test announcements by using sign language (for the deaf people across the Hartford television market), accompanied by a male announcer reading both announcements as they were displayed on screen. During the same time, KTVT in Dallas, Texas had a variant that encouraged viewers to pass along test information to any friends and neighbors who were hard of seeing or hearing at the end of the closing test announcement.

=== Purpose and cultural impact ===
The purpose of the tests was to allow the FCC and broadcasters to verify that EBS tone transmitters and decoders were functioning properly. In addition to the weekly tests, test activations of the entire system were conducted periodically for many years. These tests showed that about 80% of broadcast outlets nationwide would carry emergency programming within a period of five minutes if it had ever become necessary to activate the EBS at the national level.

The weekly broadcasts of the EBS attention signal and test scripts made it a significant part of the American cultural fabric of its time, and became the subject of a great number of jokes and skits, such as the sung versions of the announcement in the mid-1970s. In addition, many people have testified to being frightened by the test patterns and attention signal as children, and even more so by actual emergencies.

== Criticism ==
Although intended for the president to communicate with the American people in the event of a national emergency, many critics questioned whether the EBS would work in an actual emergency scenario. Curt Beckmann of WCCO-AM expressed his doubts about the system's effectiveness in a 1984 interview:

I'll tell you why it probably wouldn't work, because if the President has a national emergency, he will call in the national radio and television networks, and presto, he will communicate with us. If those networks are somehow incapacitated, and he has to go to the EBS as a backup, it's inconceivable that the rest of us will be up and running if the networks aren't up and running.

== See also ==
- CONELRAD (United States)
- Emergency Alert System (United States)
- Local Access Alert (United States)
- Alert Ready (Canada)
- Emergency Public Warning System (Alberta, Canada)
- Alberta Emergency Alert (Alberta, Canada)
- Four-minute warning (United Kingdom)
- HANDEL (United Kingdom)
- Wartime Broadcasting Service (United Kingdom)
- Public Warning System (Singapore)
- J-Alert (Japan)
