= Office of Civil and Defense Mobilization =

United States government agency

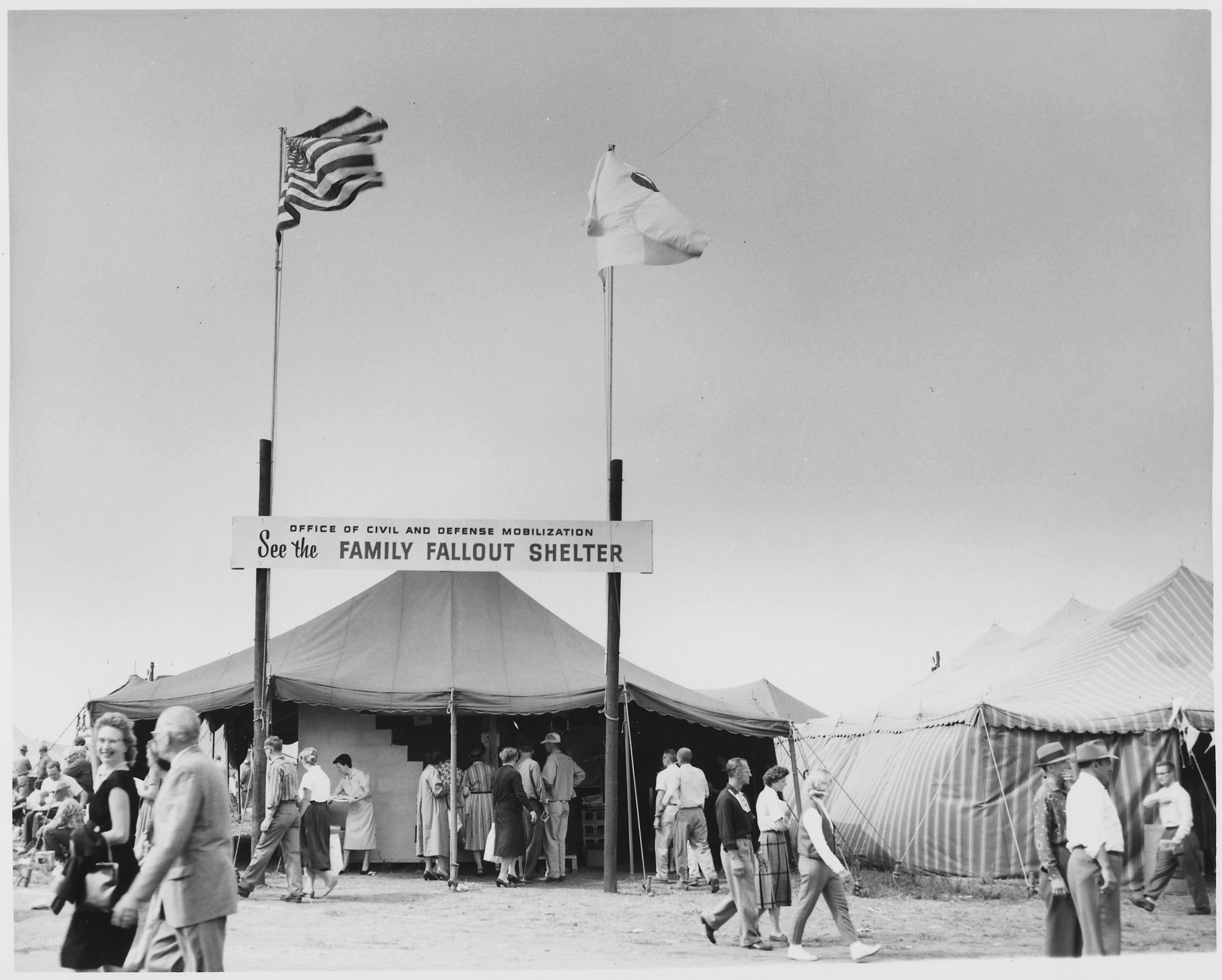
Model family fallout shelter at an Office of Civil and Defense Mobilization fair exhibit, 1960

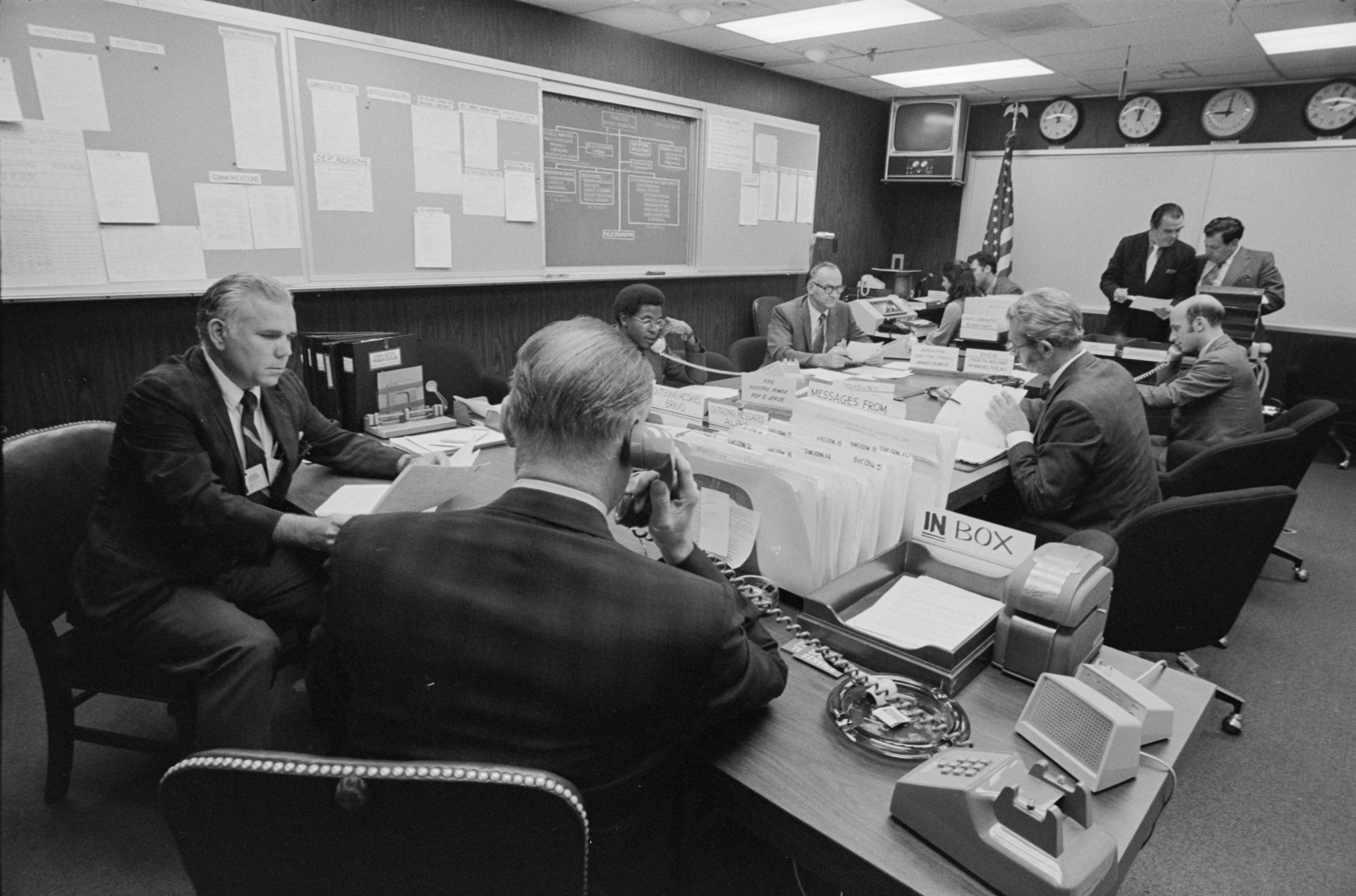
Office of Emergency Planning Operations employees at work, 1971

The Office of Civil and Defense Mobilization, created in 1958 originally as Office of Defense and Civilian Mobilization, was an office of the Executive Office of the President of the United States which consolidated the functions of the existing Office of Defense Mobilization and the Federal Civil Defense Administration. The civil defense functions of the office were transferred to the Department of Defense's Office of Civil Defense from August 1, 1961. With its remaining functions, the office was re-designated as the Office of Emergency Planning from September 22, 1961. It eventually was renamed the Office of Emergency Preparedness from October 21, 1968, and abolished on July 1, 1973.

== Directors ==
Denotes acting capacity.

Name	Start	End	President
Leo Hoegh	July 1, 1958	January 20, 1961	Dwight D. Eisenhower (1953–1961)
John Patterson; Acting	January 20, 1961	January 27, 1961	John F. Kennedy (1961–1963)
Lewis Berry; Acting	January 27, 1961	March 9, 1961	John F. Kennedy (1961–1963)
Frank Ellis	March 9, 1961	February 2, 1962	John F. Kennedy (1961–1963)
Edward McDermott	February 2, 1962	April 12, 1962	John F. Kennedy (1961–1963)
Edward McDermott	April 12, 1962	November 22, 1963	John F. Kennedy (1961–1963)
Edward McDermott	November 22, 1963	March 4, 1965	Lyndon B. Johnson (1963–1969)
Buford Ellington	March 4, 1965	March 23, 1966	Lyndon B. Johnson (1963–1969)
Farris Bryant	March 23, 1966	October 9, 1967	Lyndon B. Johnson (1963–1969)
Price Daniel	October 9, 1967	January 20, 1969	Lyndon B. Johnson (1963–1969)
George A. Lincoln	January 29, 1969	January 20, 1973	Richard Nixon (1969–1974)
Darrell Trent; Acting	January 20, 1973	July 1, 1973	Richard Nixon (1969–1974)

== See also ==
- Federal Emergency Management Agency
- United States civil defense
