= CONELRAD =

Former method of emergency broadcasting in the United States

- CONELRAD Logo, incorporating the shield of United States Civil Defense
- Type: Emergency warning system
- Country: United States
- Broadcast area: Nationwide

Ownership
- Owner: Federal Civil Defense Administration

History
- Launch date: 1951
- Closed: August 5, 1963
- Replaced by: Emergency Broadcast System (as Emergency Action Notification System)

Coverage
- Stations: 640 AM or 1240 AM
- Transmitters: Various

CONELRAD (Control of Electromagnetic Radiation) was a method of emergency broadcasting to the public of the United States in the event of enemy attack during the Cold War. It was intended to allow continuous broadcast of civil defense information to the public using radio stations, while rapidly switching the transmitter stations to make the broadcasts unsuitable for Soviet bombers that might attempt to home in on the signals (as was done during World War II, when German radio stations, based in or near cities, were used as beacons by bomber pilots).

U.S. president Harry S. Truman established CONELRAD in 1951. After the development of intercontinental ballistic missiles reduced the likelihood of a bomber attack, and the development of superior navigation systems that did not rely on radio direction finding for use in those bomber aircraft which were sent against the United States, CONELRAD was replaced by the Emergency Broadcast System (EBS) on August 5, 1963, which was later replaced by the Emergency Alert System (EAS) on January 1, 1997; all have been administered by the Federal Communications Commission (FCC).

Unlike the EBS and EAS, CONELRAD was never intended for use in local civil emergencies such as severe weather. However, the system's alerting protocol could be used for alerting of a natural disaster by 1957.

== History ==
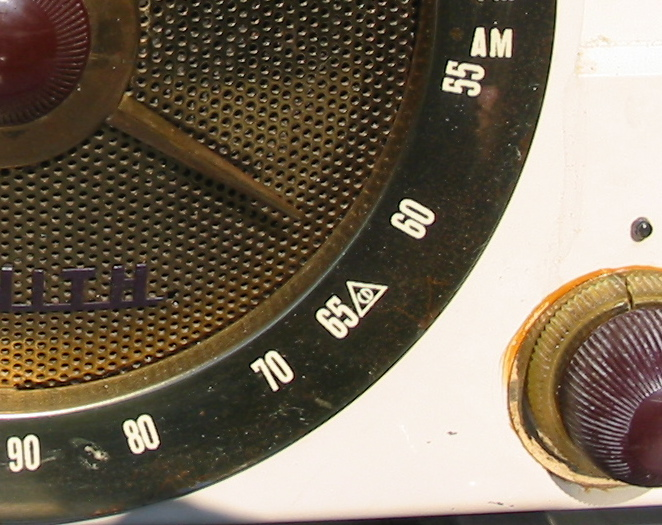
"CD Mark" symbols (usually simple white or red triangles) at CONELRAD's 640 and 1240 kHz frequencies were on the dials of most radios sold in the US between 1953 and 1963.

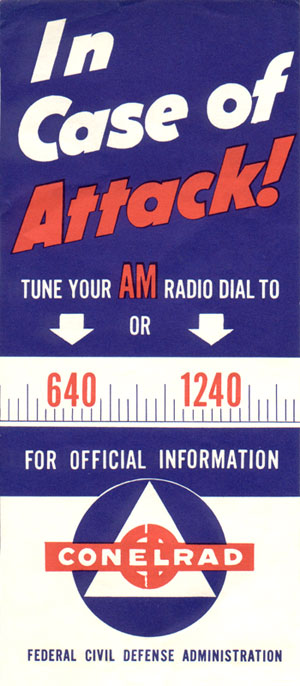
Cold War-era CONELRAD poster.

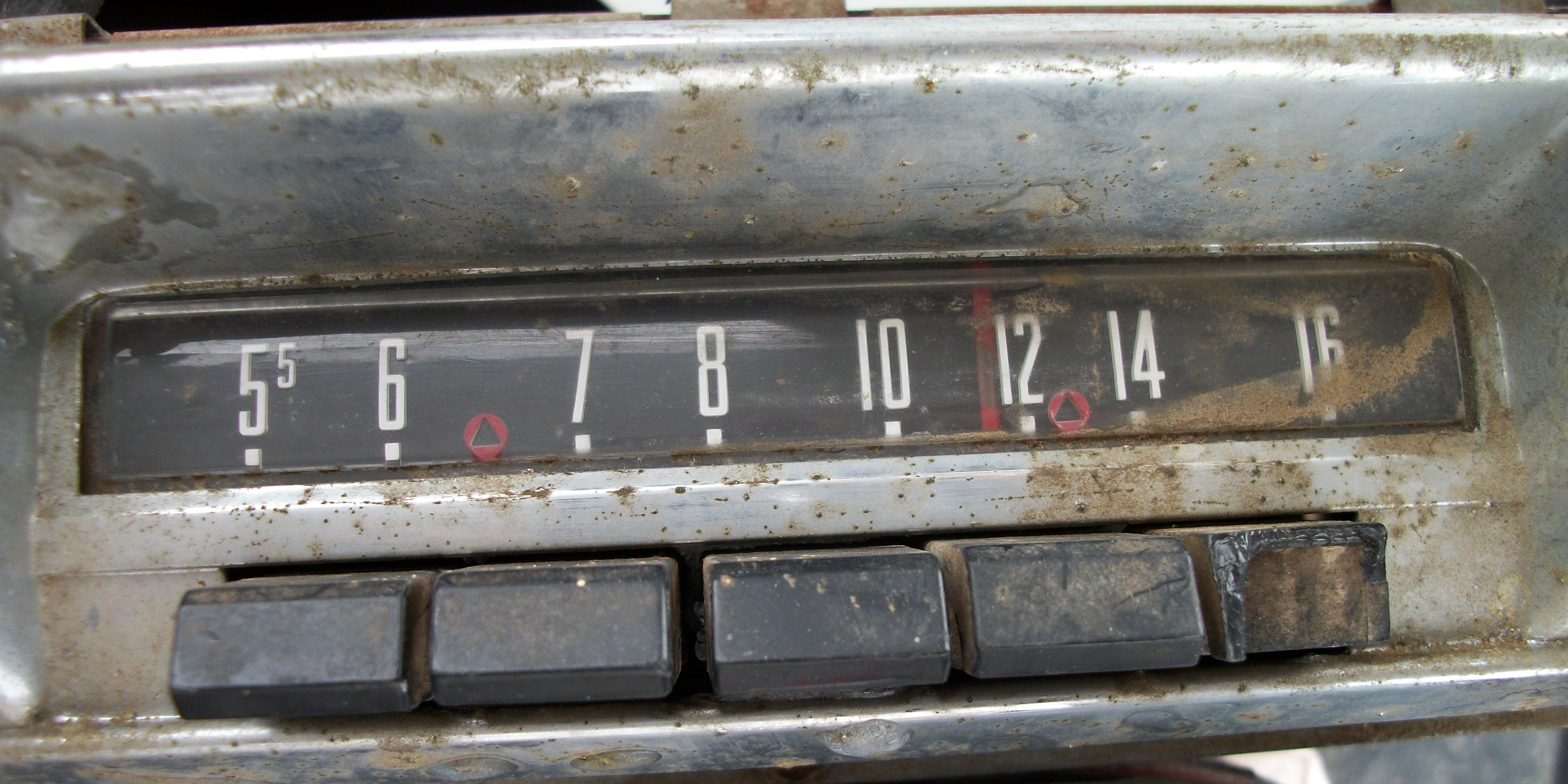
Car radio with CONELRAD frequencies marked with small red marks

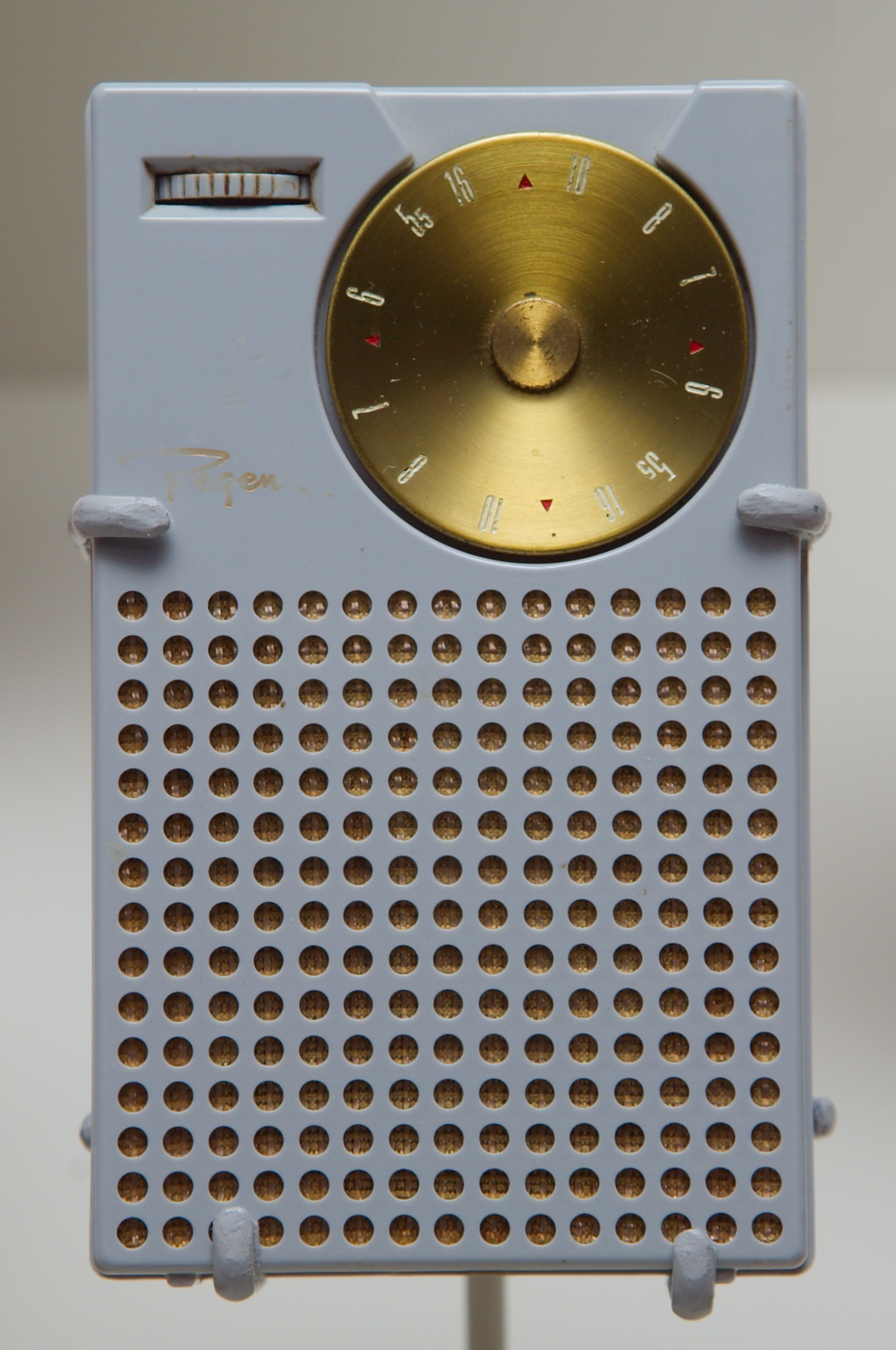
First commercial transistor radio Regency TR-1 with small red dial markings

Before 1951, there was no systematic way for the U.S. government to communicate with citizens during an emergency. However, broadcasters would typically interrupt normal programming to issue emergency bulletins, as happened during the attack on Pearl Harbor on December 7, 1941, and the first successful tornado warning in 1948. Such bulletins were the forerunner to CONELRAD.

The CONELRAD concept was originally known as the Key Station System. According to an FCC document created during the "Informal Government–Industry Technical Conference" on March 26, 1951:

The primary plan for alerting broadcast stations that are currently being considered by the FCC Study Group is known as the Key Station System. The arrangement requires certain telephone circuits (private wire or direct line to Toll Board) between the Air Defense Control Centers (A.D.C.C.) and specified radio stations to be known as "Basic Key Stations." Additional telephone circuits (direct line to Toll Board) will be required in certain cases, between "Basic Key Stations" and other stations to be known as "Relay Key Stations". Each "Basic Key Station" receiving an alert or warning signal from the A.D.C.C. shall, if so directed, proceed to broadcast a predetermined message and also relay the message by telephone to all "Relay Key Stations" under his control as specified." CONELRAD was officially introduced on December 10, 1951.

CONELRAD had a simple system for alerting the public and other "downstream" stations, consisting of a sequence of shutting the station off for five seconds, returning to the air for five seconds, again shutting down for five seconds, returning to the air again (for 5 seconds), and then transmitting a 1 kHz tone for 15 seconds. Key stations would be alerted directly. All other broadcast stations would monitor a designated station in their area.

In the event of an emergency, all United States television and FM radio stations were required to stop broadcasting. Upon alert, most AM medium-wave stations shut down. The stations that stayed on the air would transmit on either 640 or 1240 kHz. They would transmit for several minutes and then go off the air, and another station would take over on the same frequency in a "round robin" chain. This was to confuse enemy aircraft who might be navigating using radio direction finding. By law, radio sets manufactured between 1953 and 1963 had these two frequencies marked by the triangle-in-circle ("CD Mark") symbol of Civil Defense.

Although the system by which the CONELRAD process was initiated (switching the transmitter on and off) was simple, it was prone to numerous false alarms, especially during lightning storms. Transmitters could be damaged by the quick cycling. The switching later became known informally as the "EBS Stress Test" (due to many transmitters failing during tests) and was eventually discontinued when broadcast technology advanced enough to make it unnecessary.

Beginning January 2, 1957, U.S. amateur radio came under CONELRAD rules and amateur stations were also required to stop transmitting if commercial radio stations went off the air due to an alert. Several companies marketed special receivers that monitored local broadcast stations, sounding an alarm and automatically deactivating the amateur's transmitter when the broadcast station went off the air.

In a Time magazine article featured in the November 14, 1960, issue, the author details why the warning system consisting of localized civil defense sirens and the CONELRAD radio-alert system was "basically unsound". The author's alternative was to advocate for the National Emergency Alarm Repeater as a supplement, which did not need a radio or television to be switched on to warn citizens, nor a large CD siren to be in their vicinity.

=== False alarms ===
On May 5, 1955, the Continental Air Defense Command Western Division went to yellow alert for 3 to 10 minutes (depending on the alerted state), beginning at 10:40 AM PDT. The alert was raised by a Canadian radar emplacement which was unaware of an outbound United States B-47 bomber training exercise, due to communication failures. A yellow alert meant "attack expectable", and the word was sent to government and civil defense organizations. In the seven-minute window, the city of Oakland, the Sacramento Capitol Building, and others quickly sounded their alert sirens. In contrast, the City of Sacramento civil defense director waited for further confirmation before sounding the citywide siren; ultimately, he never did so. The alert was not acted on at all in Colorado due to the short length, and in Nevada, there was no alert because the person responsible for acting on it "did not know what to do with it". In Utah, Oklahoma, Arkansas, Missouri, Kansas, Texas, and Louisiana, a yellow alert was not passed along to civil authorities at all, and those states issued a "white" (military emergency) alert to units in their state instead. Even with the short alert window, many radio and television stations went off the air in accordance with CONELRAD procedure, but the alert was not long enough for stations to start broadcasting on the two authorized CONELRAD frequencies.

On the evening of November 5, 1959, WJPG, the CONELRAD control station for northeast Wisconsin and Upper Michigan was incorrectly sent an alert status message, "This is an air defense radio alert", rather than what should have been sent for a test, "This is an air defense line check." All three of Green Bay, Wisconsin's television stations (WFRV-TV, WLUK-TV, and WBAY-TV), as well as Green Bay radio stations WBAY and WJPG (and other Upper Michigan radio stations) were immediately taken off line as preparations were made for high priority stations to begin broadcasting on the two authorized CONELRAD AM frequencies (which in that area would force WOMT, a station in nearby Manitowoc at 1240 AM, off the air). The transmission error was realized and CONELRAD alert preparation (and its media blackout) reversed for affected stations about 20 minutes later.

A very similar false attack alarm was sent to radio and television stations through CONELRAD's replacement, the Emergency Broadcast System, at 9:33 AM EST on Saturday, February 20, 1971. This message was sent by accident instead of the usual weekly EAN test.

== See also ==
- Blast shelter
- Civil defense Geiger counters
- Civil protection
- Duck and cover
- Fallout shelter
- Nuclear warfare
- Nuclear weapon
- SCATANA
- WGU-20
- World War III
