= Tsunami (disambiguation) =

A tsunami is an unusually powerful series of water waves, a prominent recent example being:

- 2011 Tohoku earthquake and tsunami

Tsunami may also refer to:

== People ==
- Satoshi Tsunami (born 1961), Japanese football (soccer) coach and former international player
- Wenderson Tsunami (born 1996), Brazilian footballer
- Tsunami, a nickname of Takeru Kobayashi (born 1978), Japanese competitive eater

== Comics and animation ==
- Tsunami, a minor character in Naruto
- Tsunami (DC Comics), a DC Comics character
- Tsunami (Marvel Comics), an imprint of Marvel Comics
- Tsunami (Tenchi Muyo!), a character in the Japanese franchise Tenchi Muyo!
- Mako Tsunami, a Yu-Gi-Oh! character

== Music ==
- Tsunami (California band), a heavy metal band formed in 1983
- Tsunami (Virginia band), a 1990s indie-rock band
- Sunami (band), a hardcore punk band from San Jose, California
- Sŵnami, a Welsh pop group

=== Songs ===
- "Tsunami" (Annalisa song)
- "Tsunami" (DVBBS and Borgeous song)
- "Tsunami" (Manic Street Preachers song)
- "Tsunami" (Southern All Stars song)
- "Tsunami", a song by Eugenio in Via Di Gioia
- "Tsunami", a song by Jimi Tenor
- "Tsunami", a song by Katy Perry from Witness
- "Tsunami", a song by Prozzäk
- "Tsunami", a song by Steriogram
- "Tsunami (11:11)", a song by Bambie Thug

== Theme parks ==
- Tsunami Soaker, a "Twist 'N Splash" water ride at Six Flags St. Louis
- The Penguin Ride, formerly Tsunami Soaker, a "Twist 'N Splash" water ride at Six Flags Discovery Kingdom

== Tradenames and similar ==
- Tsunami, a fragrance of the Axe brand
- Tsunami 100, a trademarked brand name for a chemical made by Ecolab
- Tsunami (MPEG encoder), an MPEG-1 and MPEG-2 software encoder
- Tsunami Games, an American software house

== Organisations ==
- NOAA National Tsunami Warning Center
- NOAA Pacific Tsunami Warning Center
- NOAA Center for Tsunami Research

== Film and television ==
- Tsunami (2020 film), a Sri Lankan Sinhala disaster drama film
- Tsunami (2021 film), an Indian Malayalam-language sex comedy film
- "Tsunami" (Runaways), an episode of Runaways

== Other uses ==
- Democratic Tsunami, Catalan protest group advocating for self-determination
- Tsunami puzzle, also called a Nonogram, or "Paint by numbers" puzzle
- Tsunami (roller coaster), a roller coaster at the San Marcos National Fair in Mexico
- Tsunami UDP Protocol, a computer networking protocol
- Wings of Change Tsunami, an Austrian paraglider design

== See also ==
- Tsunami (comics), a set index article
