= U.S. Tsunami Warning Center =

U.S. Tsunami Warning Center may refer to:

- Pacific Tsunami Warning Center, covering Hawaii, Guam, American Samoa, Northern Mariana Islands, Puerto Rico and the U.S. Virgin Islands.
- National Tsunami Warning Center, covering all other coastal areas of the United States
