= SMART cable =

Type of trans-ocean data cable

A SMART cable, or Science Monitoring And Reliable Telecommunications (SMART) cable, is a trans-ocean submarine communications cable that includes scientific instrumentation at multiple points along the cable for measuring environmental variables like temperature, pressure, or seismic acceleration. The cable itself provides the necessary power and communications for accessing and operating the instrumentation from shore. Information from the sensors is used for scientific and engineering studies, such as observing changes to climate or ocean circulation, or for monitoring for hazards like tsunamis, earthquakes or undersea land slides. Such hazards are threats not only to human life and property, but also to the communications cables themselves. SMART cables deployed along the ocean floor provide environmental information supporting sustainable development of coastal and offshore infrastructure. Their geophysical sensors contribute to tsunami and earthquake early warning systems.

== Communications cables across ocean basins ==
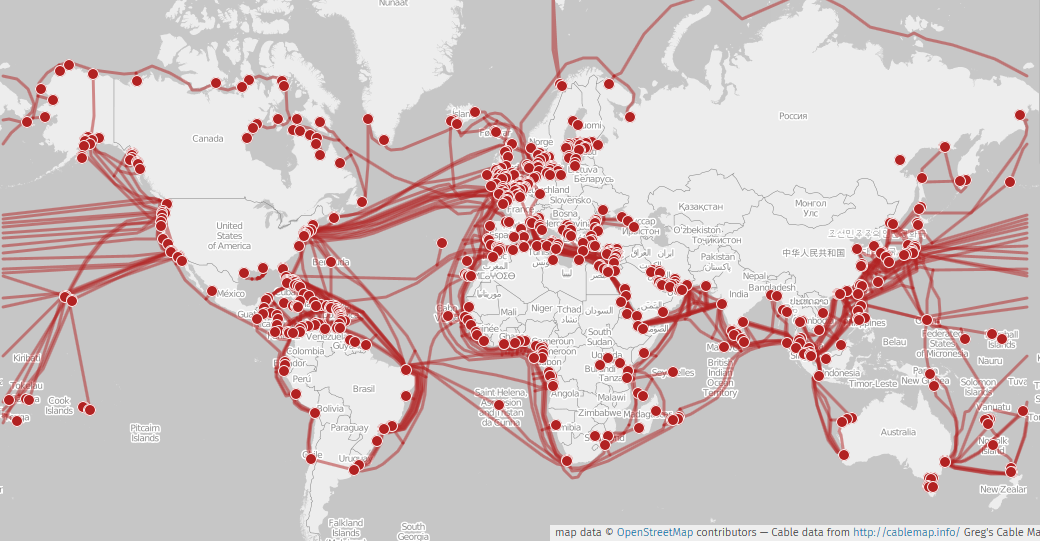
World map showing submarine cables in 2015

Within a few years after the invention of the working telegraph in 1839, the first undersea cables were attempted to enable communication between areas separated by seas or oceans. Early cables consisted of a single copper wire surrounded by a good insulator to prevent the electric current from leaking into the water. By the end of the 19th century, British-, French-, German-, and American-owned cables linked Europe and North America in a sophisticated web of telegraphic communications. Presently there are large numbers of communications cables crossing all major ocean basins.

Diagram of an optical submarine cable repeater. While providing a boost to the optical signals, the repeater package can also include instruments for oceanographic observation. The length of a repeater is about 5 m.

The original cables were not fitted with repeaters, which could speed up cable operation. Repeaters amplify the signal periodically along the line, compensating for the steady loss of signal over distance. On land-based telegraph lines relays amplify signals, but there was no practical way to power them in a submarine cable.

In the 1980s, fiber-optic cables were developed, which offered greatly improved signal bandwidth. Such cables used optical repeaters spaced at 50–100 km intervals to boost the optical signals. Fiber-optics use multiple pairs of glass fibers and light pulses for communication. Fibers are paired since a fiber communicates in one direction. The first transatlantic telephone cable to use optical fiber was TAT-8 between the United States, United Kingdom and France, which went into operation in 1988.

== Smarter cables ==
With repeaters used for fiberoptic telecommunications, cables began to offer a possible platform for ocean observation. Instruments for measuring the ocean environment could be installed in the many repeaters along a cable. Cables designed for the dual purposes of both communications and scientific observation allow the secondary scientific mission to share the telecommunications infrastructure. Such cables naturally provide modest power, real-time communication to shore, and accurate timekeeping, all requirements for scientific instrumentation. The scientific data from such deep ocean observations are important for better understanding of various oceanic and geophysical processes, such as deep-ocean climate change, circulation, sea level rise, tides, wind waves, tsunamis, and earthquakes.

Existing dedicated deep-ocean monitoring systems, such as tsunami-monitoring buoy systems or single-purpose scientific installations, are expensive. They face perennial needs for power, communication, and timely retrieval of, sometimes massive, data. Facilities with elements on the sea surface sometimes experience vandalism and/or damage from violent ocean waves. One solution was the NEPTUNE Ocean Observatory project, a cabled, deep-sea system deployed 2007-9 off the west coast of Canada for sustained observations of myriad oceanic phenomena. The observatory project provides power and internet access to seafloor instruments deployed 100s of kilometers from the coast. Smarter cables are a natural complement to these dedicated observing systems.

== SMART cables ==
The concept of SMART (Science Monitoring And Reliable Telecommunications) cables for ocean observation gained impetus in 2010 with a publication in the journal Nature by J. Y. You. Such a cable laid across the North Pacific Ocean, for example, would provide for instrumentation on the sea floor at each of the cable repeaters at 50–100 km range increments along the entire length of the cable. Nominal instruments installed on a SMART cable near a repeater include thermistors, pressure gauges, and accelerometers, which measure the motion of the seafloor during an earthquake. The fiber optic cable itself acts as a sensor, detecting small ground movements through light pulse analysis. The sensors installed on SMART cables obtain environmental information from remote deep-ocean sites in real-time.

The data provided by a SMART cable are not available from conventional methods such as from research vessels and fixed buoys. SMART cables complement other systems, such as DART (Deep-ocean Assessment and Reporting of Tsunamis). With operating lives of 15 to 25 years, SMART cables are expected to last as long as existing cables, while the scientific instrumentation on them is expected to last 10–15 years. As SMART cables eventually replace older cables across all ocean basins, the SMART cable observation system will achieve a global scale.

At present, SMART cables face several legal, economic, and security issues. The novel environmental instruments deployed on the sea floor in international waters have a legally ambiguous status. Companies deploying a trans-ocean cable do not receive obvious revenue from the scientific instrumentation, though those instruments add 10-20% additional cost to cable deployment. Lastly, such instruments may lead to security risks, perhaps becoming targets for malicious actors, or raising questions of their use for surveillance in sensitive areas.

== SMART cables and ocean observation ==
The ocean poses both environmental and societal threats, including hazards from earthquakes and tsunamis and climate-related ocean warming, circulation changes, and sea level rise. It is imperfectly observed and under sampled, however. The deep-ocean is particularly difficult and costly to monitor. There are fewer than 100 deep-ocean long-term time-series sites in the world and no long-term monitoring programs for ocean bottom pressure. SMART cables complement existing systems by filling in observational gaps, while vastly expanding the number of observations. A more complete observational system provides a better tsunami warnings and a better understanding of ocean variability (e.g., El Niño–Southern Oscillation events) and climate change. Scientists and policymakers always need better data to better model, understand, and address oceanic threats.

Recent geophysical events around the world have highlighted the dangers they pose. Examples include the Indian Ocean tsunami (2004) that killed over 200,000 people, the Samoa tsunami (2009), the Tōhoku earthquake and tsunami (2011) that caused the Fukushima nuclear disaster, and the Hunga Tonga eruption (2022).

SMART cables are a component of the Global Ocean Observing System (GOOS), contributing to global connectivity, while providing better information for ocean management. SMART cables will eventually form a deep-ocean, high-data-rate extensive network of observatories.

=== Support from the United Nations ===
To further the development of SMART cables, the United Nations established the Joint Task Force (JTF) in 2012, which represents the combined efforts of three United Nations agencies (International Telecommunication Union, World Meteorological Organization, and UNESCO Intergovernmental Oceanographic Commission). The JTF, comprising experts from several dozen countries, works to develop SMART cables. Experts from more than 80 organizations representing science, industry, government agencies and private sponsors have been facilitating worldwide efforts to develop the technologies, legal framework, and business cases for the implementation of SMART cables. The JTF Secretariat resides within the ITU’s Telecommunication Standardization Sector (ITU-T) Telecommunication Standardization Bureau (TSB).

In 2021, the United Nations launched a decade-long initiative, spanning the period from 2021 to 2030, with the goal of reversing the decline in ocean health and unifying ocean stakeholders globally under a shared framework. This initiative, known as the Decade of Ocean Science for Sustainable Development (Ocean Decade), was mandated by the UN General Assembly and is being spearheaded by the Intergovernmental Oceanographic Commission (IOC) of UNESCO. At the UN’s Ocean Conference in 2022, the UN highlighted how SMART cables demonstrate a more rational use of an exclusively dedicated infrastructure, with a negligible increase in investment and minimal operational and maintenance costs.

=== First deployments ===
The first SMART demonstration cable in the Mediterranean Sea was laid in December 2023 by Italy’s National Institute of Geophysics and Volcanology (INGV) east of Sicily to monitor the activity of Mount Edna. In January 2004, New Caledonia and Vanuatu signed a deal for a 375-kilometer-long SMART cable connection. France agreed to pay for the scientific operations. In mid-2024 Portugal signed a contract to start the deployment of a SMART fiber-optic cable stretching 3700 km from Portugal to Madeira and the Azores, across the eastern Atlantic seafloor. The cable will be capable of carrying internet data, and monitoring the ocean and earthquake activity, with one aim to detect tsunami waves. It is expected to cost €154 million.

== See also ==
- International Telecommunication Union
