= Indian Ocean Tsunami Warning System =

The Indian Ocean Tsunami Warning System, abbreviated as IOTWS, was set up to provide warning to inhabitants of nations bordering the Indian Ocean of approaching tsunamis. The tsunami warning system has been in use since the mid-2000s.

== Background ==
A warning system for the Indian Ocean was prompted by the 2004 Indian Ocean earthquake and resulting tsunami, which left approximately 300,000 people dead or missing. Many analysts claimed that the disaster would have been mitigated if there had been an effective warning system in place, citing the well-established Hawaii-based Pacific Tsunami Warning Center, which operates in the Pacific Ocean.

People in some areas would have had more than adequate time to seek safety if they were aware of the impending catastrophe. The only way to effectively mitigate the impact of a tsunami is through an early warning system. Other methods such as sea walls only work for a percentage of waves, but a warning system is effective for all waves originating outside a minimum distance from the coastline.

== Construction ==
The Indian Ocean Tsunami Warning System was agreed to in a United Nations conference held in January 2005 in Kobe, Japan as an initial step towards an International Early Warning Programme. Nanometrlolics (Ottawa, Canada) and RESULTS Marine Private Limited, India, delivered and successfully installed 17 Seismic VSAT stations with two Central Recording Station to provide the seismic event alert to the scientists through SMS and e-mail automatically within two minutes.

The system became active in late June 2006 following the leadership of UNESCO. It consists of 25 seismographic stations relaying information to 26 national tsunami information centers, as well as six Deep-ocean Assessment and Reporting of Tsunami (DART) buoys. However, UNESCO warned that further coordination between governments and methods of relaying information from the centers to the civilians at risk are required to make the system effective.

Sensor data is processed by the U.S. Pacific Tsunami Warning Center in Hawaii and the Japan Meteorological Agency, and alerts are forwarded to threatened countries and also made available to the general public. National governments warn citizens through a variety of means, including Cell Broadcast messages, SMS messages, radio and television broadcasts, sirens from dedicated platforms and mosque loudspeakers, and police vehicles with loudspeakers.

== Performance during emergencies ==
The system was not yet operational during the 2006 Pangandaran earthquake and tsunami. The Indonesian government did receive tsunami warnings from the warning centers but did not have a system to relay the alert to its citizens. At least 23,000 people evacuated the coast after the quake, either fearing a tsunami or because their homes had been destroyed. Waves as high as 7.39 m (24.2 ft) still resulted in about 700 fatalities and 9,000 injuries.

In the 2012 Indian Ocean sequence, the system alerted the Indian islands on Andaman and Nicobar within eight minutes. Some tsunami warning sirens in Aceh were delayed by about 20 minutes due to failure of the electrical grid caused by the proximity of the earthquake, and evacuation routes in Banda Aceh were jammed with traffic.

Of the 28 countries that ring the Indian Ocean, Australia, Indonesia and India are now responsible for spearheading tsunami warnings in the area.

The system had no means to predict tsunamis from volcanic eruptions. After the 2018 Sunda Strait tsunami, the Indonesian government installed sea level sensors to fill this gap.
