= Tsunami (comics) =

Tsunami, in comics, may refer to:

- Tsunami (DC Comics), a character
- Tsunami (Marvel Comics)

== See also ==
- Tsunami (disambiguation)
