= International Early Warning Programme =

The International Early Warning Program (IEWP), was first proposed at the Second International Early Warning Conference (EWCII) in 2003 in Bonn, Germany. It developed increasing importance in the wake of the 2004 Indian Ocean tsunami, which claimed over 200,000 lives and injured over half a million people.

== History ==
In January 2005, the United Nations (UN) launched extensive plans to create a global warning system to lessen the impact of deadly natural disasters at the World Conference on Disaster Reduction, held in Kobe, Japan. The UN programme would help improve prevention and resilience to all types of natural disasters, including droughts, wildfires, floods, typhoons, hurricanes, landslides, volcanoes and tsunamis, by using a comprehensive set of methods including rapid information sharing and training communities at risk. It is believed that the loss of human life would have been dramatically reduced, if a tsunami warning system, like the one that exists for the volcano-and-earthquake prone Pacific Rim, had been operational in the Indian Ocean. Technology, such as tremor and tidal gauges, fast data transfer and alarm mechanisms, used in combination with training in the danger zones, would have given hundreds of thousands of people time to move to the safety of higher ground.

Early warning systems are now widely recognized as worthwhile and necessary investments to help save lives. In 2004, millions of people in the Americas and Asia were evacuated when tropical storms struck, which saved thousands of lives. According to Michel Jarraud, Secretary-General of the World Meteorological Organisation, about 90% of all natural disasters were caused by hazards related to weather and water. Speaking at the conference, he said: "It is WMO's aim to halve the number of deaths due to natural disasters of meteorological, hydrological and climatic origin over the next 15 years, more specifically to reduce by half the associated ten-year average fatality from the period 1995-2004 to the period 2010-2019 for these disasters."

There was unanimous support among participants to the January 2005 conference, as an initial step towards an International Early Warning Programme, for UN-led efforts to establish an Indian Ocean Tsunami Warning System.

== See also ==
- IDNDR International Decade for Natural Disaster Reduction
- Emergency management
