= NOAA Center for Tsunami Research =

US research institute

Coordinates: 47.6835197°N 122.2657958°W

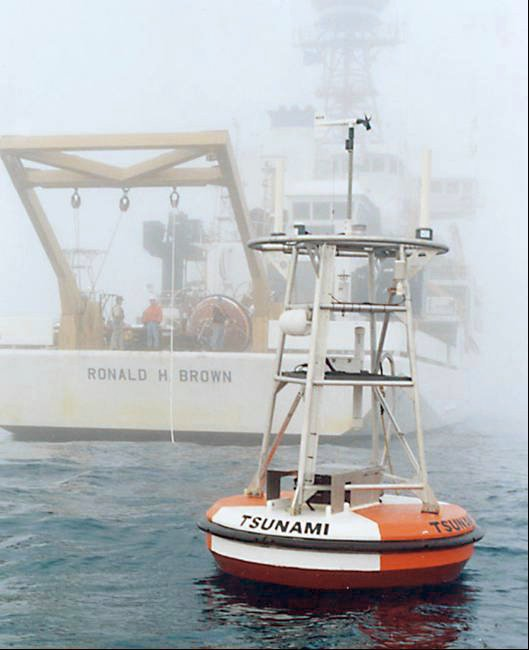
The Deep-ocean Assessment and Reporting of Tsunamis (DART® II) tsunami buoy.

The NOAA Center for Tsunami Research (NCTR), located at the Pacific Marine Environmental Laboratory (PMEL) in Seattle, Washington, performs research in support of tsunami forecast models to increase the speed and accuracy of operational forecasts and warnings, tsunami inundation models to predict tsunami impacts on coastal communities, and tsunami measurement/detection technology for optimally designed networks of tsunami buoys.

== Tsunami measurements and forecast modeling ==
PMEL/NCTR developed and holds the patent on the Deep-ocean Assessment and Reporting of Tsunamis DART® tsunami detection buoy that forms the backbone of the global tsunami detection network. Operational support for the DART® buoys has been transitioned to NDBC.

The NCTR's SIFT tsunami forecasting system is described in the NCTR YouTube video about the 2010 Chile tsunami event, and in more detail in the NCTR Power Point presentation Developing tsunami flooding forecast software. The SIFT system is deployed at the two NOAA Tsunami Warning Centers.

In 2004, the NCTR was awarded a Department of Commerce Gold Medal|Gold Medal"for the creation and use of a new moored buoy system to provide accurate and timely warning information on tsunamis"). In 2005, the NCTR received a Department of Commerce Gold Medal, "for research and development leading to the creation of a tsunami forecasting capability".

== The NCTR website ==
The NCTR website describes the project's research and scientific publications. Event pages for larger tsunami events provide modeled tsunami propagation animations, tsunami energy graphics, and model-data comparisons at sea level stations. Other sections of the website include a tsunami FAQ and Educational resources. Also included are tsunami animations and YouTube videos.
