= Tsunami warning system =

System used to detect and warn the public about impending tsunamis

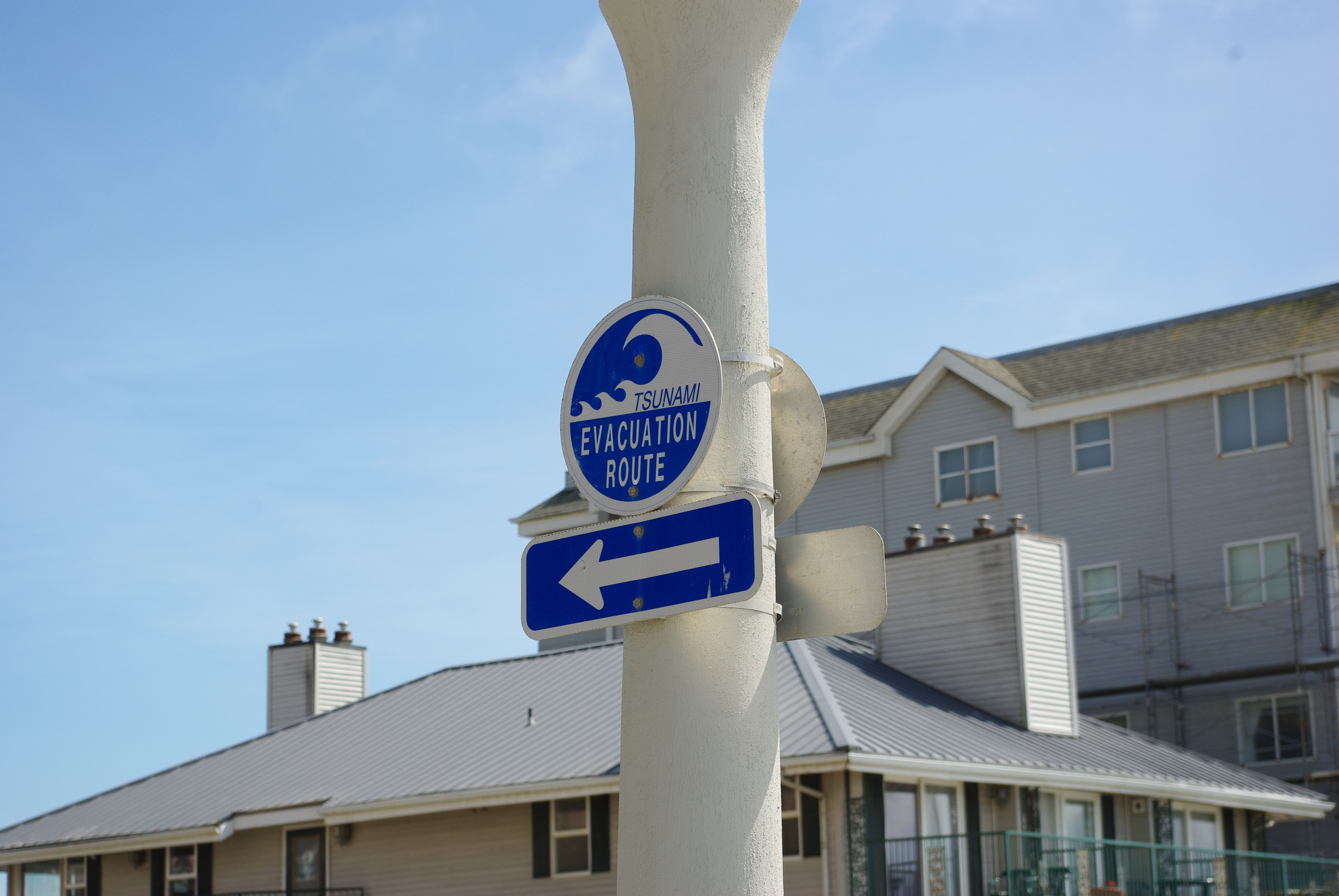
Evacuation route sign in a low-lying coastal area on the West Coast of the United States

A tsunami warning system (TWS) is used to detect tsunamis in advance and issue the warnings to prevent loss of life and damage to property. It is made up of two equally important components: a network of sensors to detect tsunamis and a communications infrastructure to issue timely alarms to permit evacuation of the coastal areas. There are two distinct types of tsunami warning systems: international and regional. When operating, seismic alerts are used to instigate the watches and warnings; then, data from observed sea level height (either shore-based tide gauges or DART buoys) are used to verify the existence of a tsunami. Other systems have been proposed to augment the warning procedures; for example, it has been suggested that the duration and frequency content of t-wave energy (which is earthquake energy trapped in the ocean SOFAR channel) is indicative of an earthquake's tsunami potential. While tsunamis travel at between 500 and 1,000 km/h (around 0.14 and 0.28 km/s) in open water, earthquakes can be detected almost at once as seismic waves travel with a typical speed of 4 km/s (around 14,400 km/h). This gives time for a possible tsunami forecast to be made and warnings to be issued to threatened areas, if warranted. However, as the connection between earthquakes and tsunamis is not fully understood, the reliability of these systems are limited.

== History and forecasting ==
The first rudimentary system to alert communities of an impending tsunami was attempted in Hawaii in the 1920s. More advanced systems were developed in the wake of the April 1, 1946 (caused by the 1946 Aleutian Islands earthquake) and May 23, 1960 (caused by the 1960 Valdivia earthquake) tsunamis which caused massive devastation in Hilo, Hawaii.

== International systems (IS) ==
=== Pacific Ocean ===
Japanese Tsunami warning sign

Tsunami warnings (SAME code: TSW) for most of the Pacific Ocean are issued by the Pacific Tsunami Warning Center (PTWC), operated by the United States NOAA in Ewa Beach, Hawaii. NOAA's National Tsunami Warning Center (NTWC) in Palmer, Alaska issues warnings for North America, including Alaska, British Columbia, Oregon, California, the Gulf of Mexico, and the East coast. The PTWC was established in 1949, following the 1946 Aleutian Island earthquake and a tsunami that resulted in 165 casualties on Hawaii and in Alaska; NTWC was founded in 1967. International coordination is achieved through the International Coordination Group for the Tsunami Warning System in the Pacific, established by the Intergovernmental Oceanographic Commission of UNESCO.

=== Chile ===
In 2005, Chile started to implement the Integrated Plate boundary Observatory Chile (IPOC) which in the following years become a network of 14 multiparameter stations for monitoring the 600-km seismic distance between Antofagasta and Arica. Each station was provided with broadband seismometer, accelerometer, GPS antenna. In four cases, it was installed a short-base tiltmeter (pendulum). Some stations were ubicated underground at a depth of 3–4 meters. The network completed the tidal gauge of the Hydrographic and Oceanographic Service of the Chilean Navy.

The long-base tiltmeters (LBTs) and the STS2 seismometer of the IPOC recorded a series of long-period signals some days after the 2010 Maule earthquake. The same effect was registered by broadband seismometers of India and Japan some days after the 2004 Indian Ocean earthquake and tsunami. Simulations held in 2013 on historical data highlighted "tiltmeters and broadband seismometers are thus valuable instruments for monitoring tsunamis in complement with tide gauge arrays." In the case of the 2010 Maule earthquake, tilt-sensors observed a discriminating signal "starting 20 min before the arrival time of the tsunami at the nearest point on the coastline."

=== Indian Ocean (ICG/IOTWMS) ===
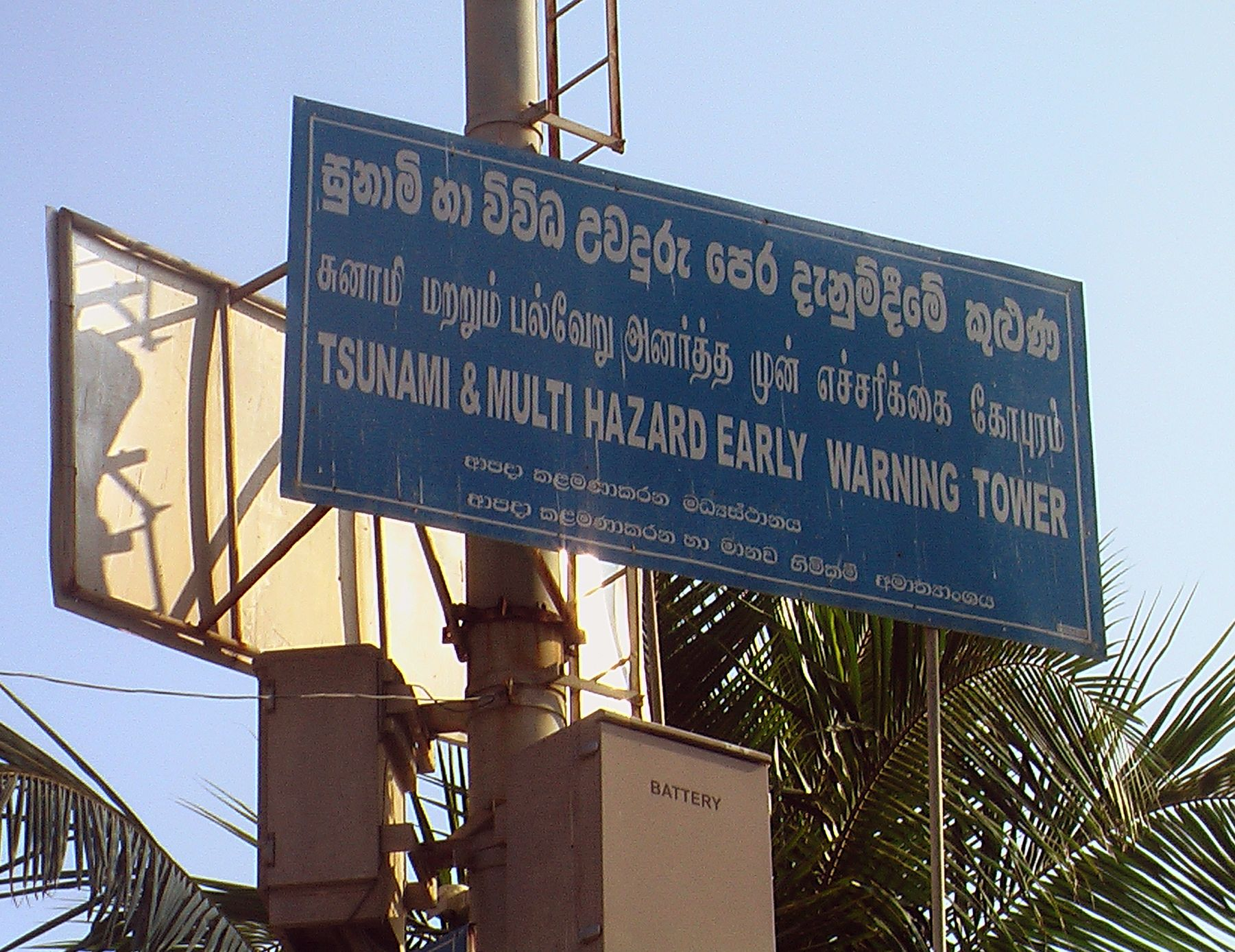
Tsunami Early Warning Tower board in Hikkaduwa, Sri Lanka

After the 2004 Indian Ocean Tsunami which killed almost 250,000 people, a United Nations conference was held in January 2005 in Kobe, Japan, and decided that as an initial step towards an International Early Warning Programme, the UN should establish an Indian Ocean Tsunami Warning System. This resulted in a warning system for Indonesia and other affected areas. Indonesia's system fell out of service in 2012 because the detection buoys were no longer operational. Tsunami prediction was then limited to detection of seismic activity, with no system to predict tsunamis based on volcanic eruptions.

Indonesia was hit by tsunamis in September and December 2018. The December 2018 tsunami was caused by a volcano. Sea level sensors were then installed by the Indonesian government to fill the prediction gap.

=== North Eastern Atlantic, the Mediterranean and Connected Seas (ICG/NEAMTWS) ===
The First United Session of the Inter-governmental Coordination Group for the Tsunami Early Warning and Mitigation System in the North Eastern Atlantic, the Mediterranean and connected Seas (ICG/NEAMTWS), established by the Intergovernmental Oceanographic Commission of UNESCO Assembly during its 23rd Session in June 2005, through Resolution XXIII.14, took place in Rome on 21 and 22 November 2005.

The meeting, hosted by the Government of Italy (the Italian Ministry of Foreign Affairs and the Italian Ministry for the Environment and Protection of Land and Sea), was attended by more than 150 participants from 24 countries, 13 organizations and numerous observers.

=== Caribbean ===
The Caribbean does not have a comprehensive tsunami warning system, instead relying on the Pacific Tsunami Warning Centre (PTWC) in the case of a tsunami.

== Regional warning systems ==
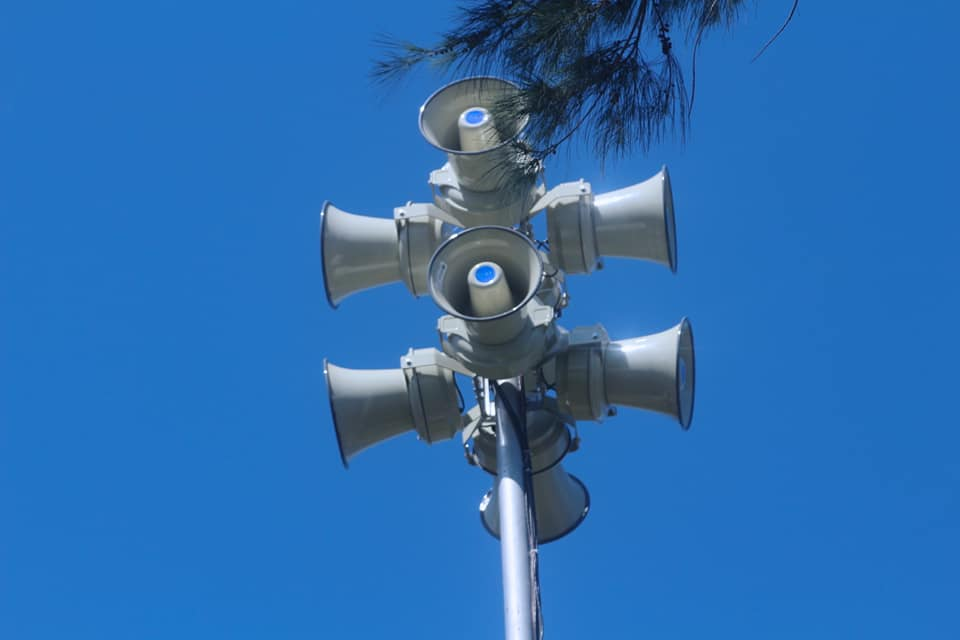
Tsunami warning system in East Timor

Regional (or local) warning system centers use seismic data about nearby recent earthquakes to determine if there is a possible local threat of a tsunami. Such systems are capable of issuing warnings to the general public (via public address systems and sirens) in less than 15 minutes. Although the epicenter and moment magnitude of an underwater quake and the probable tsunami arrival times can be quickly calculated, it is almost always impossible to know whether underwater ground shifts have occurred which will result in tsunami waves. As a result, false alarms can occur with these systems, but the disruption is small, which makes sense due to the highly localized nature of these extremely quick warnings, in combination with how difficult it would be for a false alarm to affect more than a small area of the system. Real tsunamis would affect more than just a small portion.

=== Japan ===
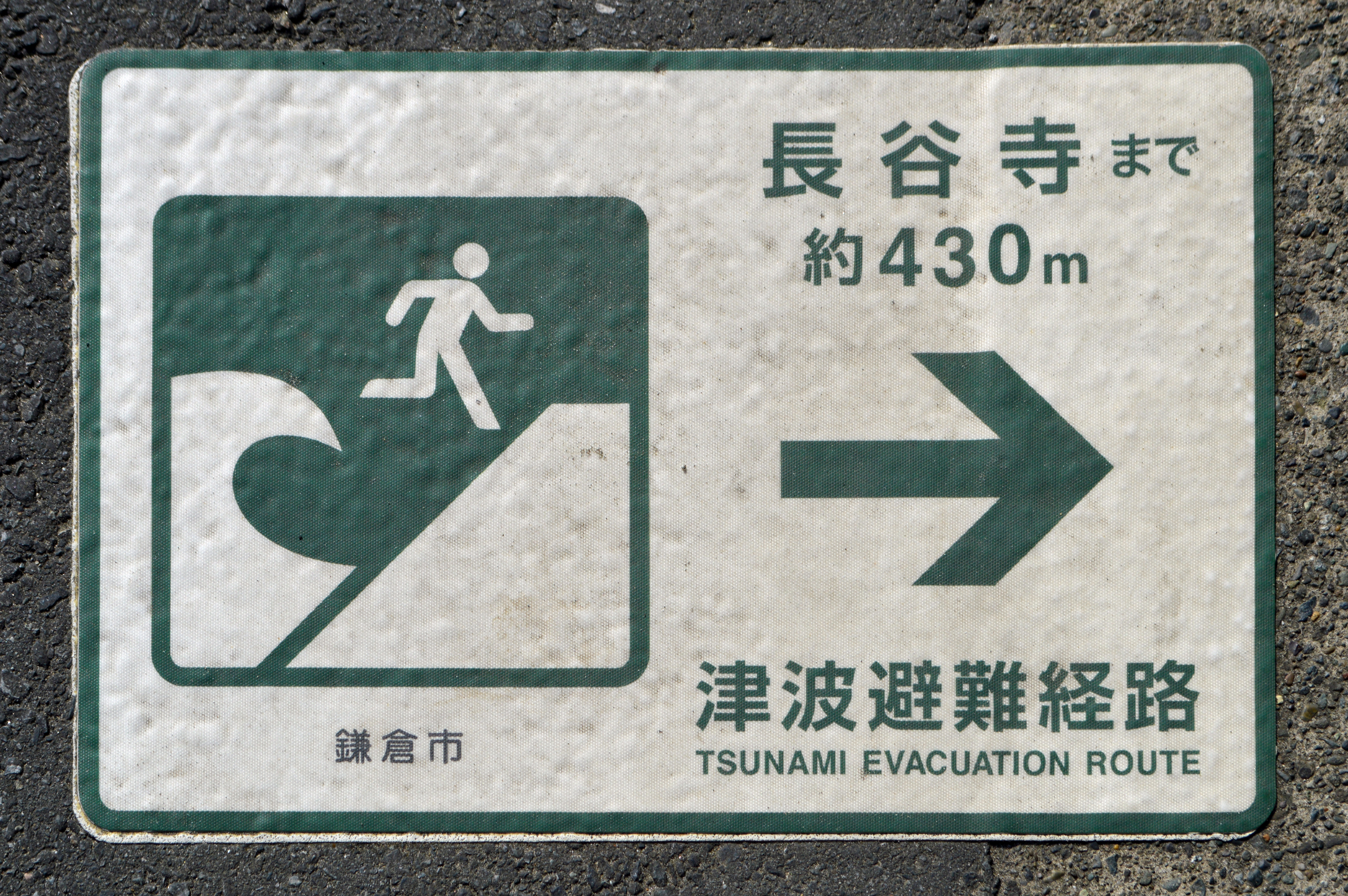
Evacuation route sign on the pavement in Kamakura, Japan

Japan has a nationwide tsunami warning system. The system usually issues the warning minutes after an Earthquake Early Warning (EEW) is issued, should there be expected waves. The tsunami warning was issued within 3 minutes with the most serious rating on its warning scale during the 2011 Tōhoku earthquake and tsunami; it was rated as a "major tsunami", being at least 3 m (9.8 ft) high. An improved system was unveiled on March 7, 2013, following the 2011 disaster to better assess imminent tsunamis.

=== India ===
India is one of the 5 countries to have the most advanced tsunami warning systems in the world. In 2004, right after being hit by an earthquake in Sumatra, a massive tsunami devastated the coasts of India, prompting the Government of India to set up the INCOIS (Indian National Centre for Ocean Information Services). The center is an autonomous organization of the Government of India, under the Ministry of Earth Sciences, located in Pragathi Nagar, Hyderabad, India. This center offers ocean information and advisory services to society, industry, government bodies in areas like Tsunami warning, ocean state forecast, fishing zones and more.

This center receives data from over 35 sea level tide gauges at intervals of 5 minutes. Along with this it receives data from wave rider buoys, bottom pressure readers (BPRs) and a network of seismographs that have been installed at various locations in the IOR (Indian Ocean Region). The Indian Tsunami Buoy Type 1 System consists of 2 units – a surface buoy and a bottom pressure reader (BPR). Communication between BPR and the surface buoy is through acoustic modems and the surface buoys use the INSAT satellite system to communicate readings back to shore stations. The Tsunami warning station collates information from 17 seismic stations of the Indian Meteorological Department (IMD), 10 stations of Wadia Institute of Himalayan Geology (WIHG) and more than 300 international stations. INDOFOS (INDian Ocean FOrecasting System) is a service that forecasts the ocean state and is capable of predicting surface and sub surface features and states of the Indian Ocean. These forecasts are made accessible through Information centers, Radio, local digital sign boards, websites, TV channels and subscription services. Oceansat 2 system is a collection of earth observation satellites operated by ISRO in conjunction with Oceansat ground station that covers an area of 5000 km radius around India and is capable of monitoring sea flora and fauna along with oceanic features like meandering patterns, eddies, rings, upwelling and others. Oceansat-2 was successfully deployed to predict the landfall and mitigate the effects of Cyclone Phailin, in October 2013.

== Conveying the warning ==
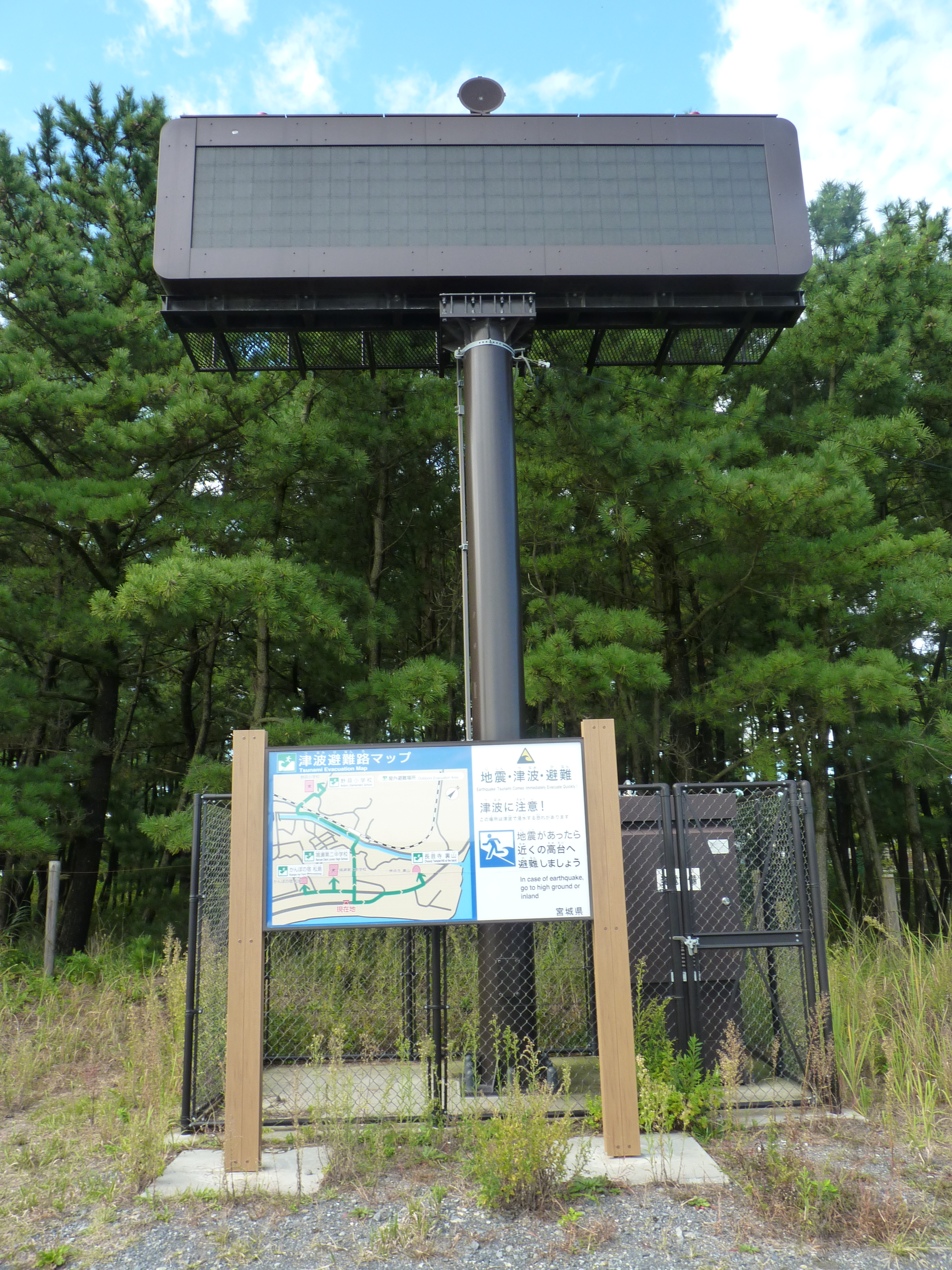
Mast with warning system, and sign detailing escape routes, on the coast of Okumatsushima, Miyagi prefecture, Japan (this coast was severely hit by the 2011 tsunami)

Detection and prediction of tsunamis is only half the work of the system. Of equal importance is the ability to warn the populations of the areas that will be affected. All tsunami warning systems feature multiple lines of communications (such as Cell Broadcast, SMS, e-mail, fax, radio, texting and telex, often using hardened dedicated systems) enabling emergency messages to be sent to the emergency services and armed forces, as well to population-alerting systems (e.g. sirens) and systems like the Emergency Alert System.

== Shortcomings ==
With the speed at which tsunami waves travel through open water, no system can protect against a very sudden tsunami, where the coast in question is too close to the epicenter. A devastating tsunami occurred off the coast of Hokkaidō in Japan as a result of an earthquake on July 12, 1993. As a result, 165 people on the small island of Okushiri, Hokkaido lost their lives, and hundreds more were missing or injured. This tsunami struck just three to five minutes after the quake, and most victims were caught while fleeing for higher ground and secure places after surviving the earthquake.

While there remains the potential for sudden devastation from a tsunami, warning systems can be effective. For example, if there were a very large subduction zone earthquake (moment magnitude 9.0) off the west coast of the United States, people in Japan, would therefore have more than 12 hours (and likely warnings from warning systems in Hawaii and elsewhere) before any tsunami arrived, giving them some time to evacuate areas likely to be affected.

== See also ==
- Deep-ocean Assessment and Reporting of Tsunamis (DART)
- Disaster risk reduction
- Pacific Disaster Center
- Sound Fixing and Ranging (SOFAR) channel
