= Pacific Marine Environmental Laboratory =

NOAA environmental research laboratory

Agency overview
- Headquarters: Seattle, Washington; Newport, Oregon
- Agency executive: Michelle M. McClure, Director
- Parent agency: National Oceanic and Atmospheric Administration
- Website: www.pmel.noaa.gov

The Pacific Marine Environmental Laboratory (PMEL) is a federal laboratory in the National Oceanic and Atmospheric Administration (NOAA) Office of Oceanic and Atmospheric Research (OAR). It is one of seven NOAA Research Laboratories (RLs), established in 1973. The PMEL is split across two sites in the Pacific Northwest, in Seattle, Washington and Newport, Oregon.

== Research ==
PMEL carries out interdisciplinary scientific investigations in oceanography and atmospheric science to improve our understanding of the complex physical and geochemical processes operating in the world oceans, especially the Pacific Ocean, to define the forcing functions and the processes driving ocean circulation and the global climate system, and to improve environmental forecasting capabilities and other supporting services for marine commerce and fisheries.

== See also ==
- Arctic Report Card
- NOAA Center for Tsunami Research
