= National Tsunami Warning Center =

Detects and analyzes earthquakes worldwide, issuing warnings to local officials

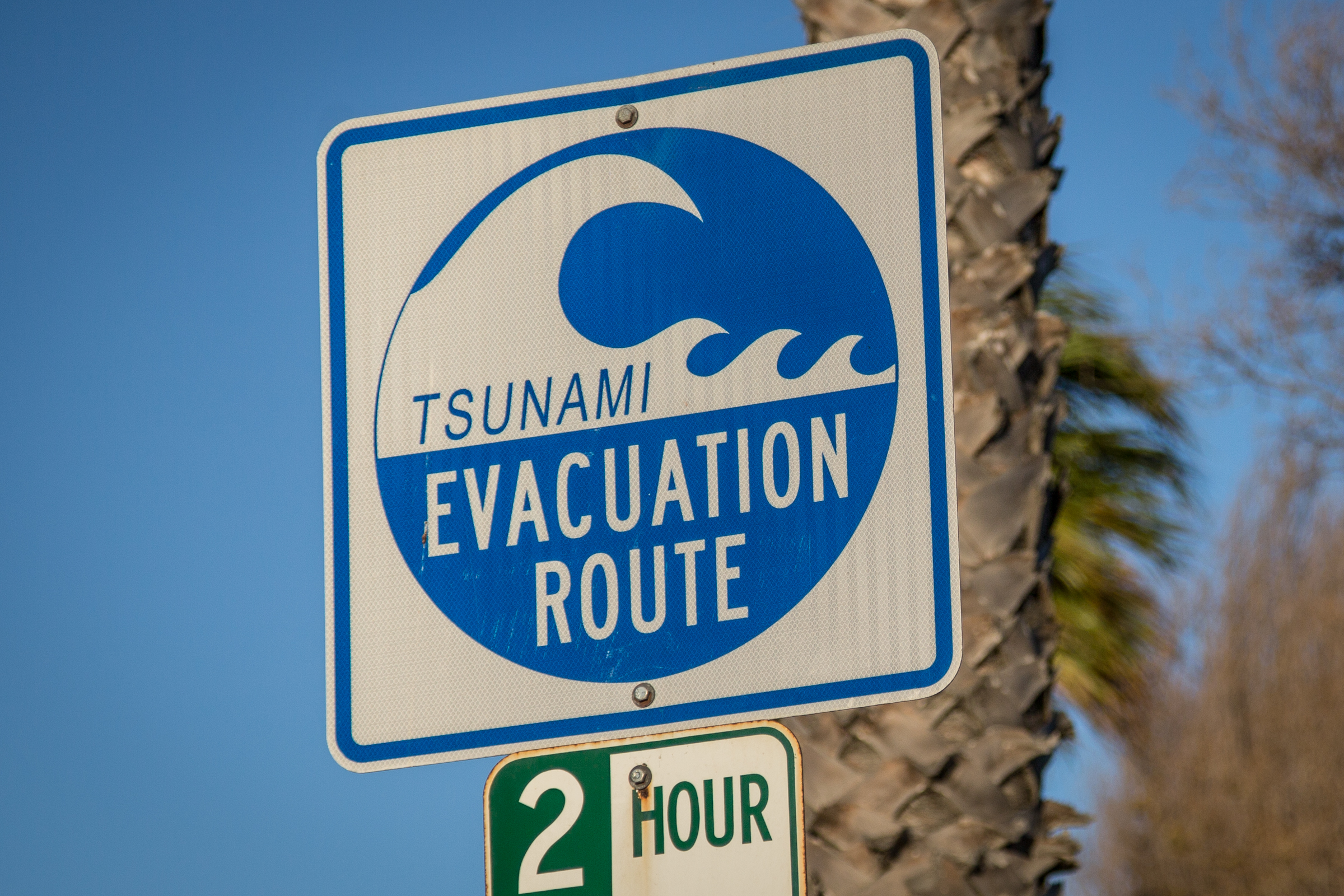
Tsunami evacuation routes are found in some regions prone to tsunamis

The National Tsunami Warning Center (NTWC) is one of two tsunami warning centers in the United States, covering all coastal regions of the United States and Canada, except Hawaii, Guam, the Northern Mariana Islands, Puerto Rico and the U.S. Virgin Islands. Until 2013, it was known as the West Coast and Alaska Tsunami Warning Center.

The NTWC, operated by the National Oceanic and Atmospheric Administration (NOAA), detects and analyzes earthquakes worldwide, issuing warnings to local officials in the hazard zones about the advisability of evacuating low-lying coastal areas and moving ships to deep water.

The Pacific Tsunami Warning Center has the responsibility for areas of the U.S. which are not covered by NTWC.

== History ==
Following the March 27, 1964 Alaska earthquake and tsunami, the NTWC (formerly known as The Palmer Observatory) was established in 1967 in Palmer, Alaska, under the auspices of the United States Coast and Geodetic Survey. This earthquake alerted State and Federal officials that a facility was necessary to provide timely and effective tsunami warnings and earthquake information to the coastal areas of Alaska. Congress provided funds in 1965 to construct two new observatories and establish a tsunami warning system in Alaska. The first observatory constructed was at the U.S. Naval Station on Adak Island in the Andreanof Islands in the Central Aleutians. The City of Palmer, in the Matanuska Valley 42 miles northeast of Anchorage, was selected as the site for the primary observatory due to its proximity to bedrock for instrumentation and to communications facilities. Construction of the observatory installations, the task of engineering and assembling the data systems, and the hookup of the extensive telecommunications and data telemetry network was completed in the summer of 1967. With the dedication of the Palmer Observatory on September 2, 1967, the Alaska Regional Tsunami Warning System (ARTWS) became operational.

Originally, the tsunami warning responsibility for Alaska was shared by the three observatories located at Palmer, Adak and Sitka. Sitka, a seismological observatory since 1904, and Fairbanks were the only two seismic stations operating in Alaska in 1964. The responsibilities of Adak and Sitka were limited to issuing a tsunami warning for events occurring within 300 miles of their location. In later years, the responsibility to provide tsunami warning services for Alaska was transferred from the Adak and Sitka observatories to the Palmer Observatory. Sitka and Adak Observatories were eventually closed in the early 1990s, although the seismic instrumentation is still maintained.

In 1973, the Palmer Observatory was transferred to the National Weather Service's Alaska Region and changed its name to Alaska Tsunami Warning Center (ATWC). In 1982, its area of responsibility (AOR) was enlarged to include the issuing of tsunami warnings to California, Oregon, Washington, and British Columbia for potential tsunamigenic earthquakes occurring in their coastal areas. In 1996, the responsibility was again expanded to include all Pacific-wide tsunamigenic sources that could affect the California, Oregon, Washington, British Columbia and Alaska coasts, and the name was changed to the West Coast/Alaska Tsunami Warning Center (WC/ATWC) to reflect those new responsibilities.

In 2003, a new Tsunami Warning Center building was constructed in the yard of the original building. This new facility was the first LEED certified building in the state of Alaska, and within the U.S. Department of Commerce. LEED (Leadership in Energy and Environmental Design) certification is granted by the U.S. Green Building Council, and awards environmentally sensitive construction practices. This new facility provides upgraded power and communications capability, as well as office space for the expanded staff, assuring that the center will continue to provide quality products to the public well into the future.

Following the devastating Indian Ocean tsunami in late 2004, the WC/ATWC expanded its scope to the U.S. Atlantic coast, and the Atlantic coast of Canada. On 1 October 2013, the name was changed to the National Tsunami Warning Center (NTWC) to reflect this expanded geographical zone of responsibility.

== Coverage area ==
NTWC is the tsunami warning authority for the following regions:

Country	Areas
United States	Alaska, Washington, Oregon, California, Connecticut, Delaware, Florida, Georgia, Maine, Maryland, Massachusetts, New Hampshire, New Jersey, New York, North Carolina, Rhode Island, South Carolina, Virginia, Alabama, Louisiana, Mississippi, Texas
Canada	British Columbia, Nova Scotia, New Brunswick, Prince Edward Island, Newfoundland and Labrador, Quebec

Other parts of the United States are covered by the Pacific Tsunami Warning Center.

== Overview of operations ==
To provide accurate and timely tsunami bulletins for its area of responsibility (which includes the U.S. Atlantic, Gulf, and Pacific coasts; Puerto Rico and the U.S. Virgin Islands; and the coastal regions of Canada), the NTWC detects, locates, and analyzes earthquakes worldwide. When an earthquake triggers the center’s automated alarm system, NTWC initiates a tsunami-evaluation process consisting of four primary steps: automatic location and magnitude estimation; analyst review of seismic data; sea-level confirmation from tide-gauge and deep-ocean sensors; and dissemination of messages to emergency-management officials.

Tsunami bulletins are distributed to state and provincial emergency-management agencies, federal disaster-preparedness offices, National Weather Service forecast centers, Canada’s Atlantic Storm Prediction Center, the U.S. Coast Guard, the Federal Aviation Administration, military installations, local emergency managers, and the United States Geological Survey, among other partners in the U.S. and Canada. Earthquakes that are widely felt but below tsunami warning, watch, or advisory thresholds generate informational statements to the same distribution network, helping prevent unnecessary evacuations.

In addition to warning operations, the center supports community-preparedness programs that promote public awareness of tsunami hazards and strengthen local planning and response capabilities. The center also engages in research and development projects aimed at improving tsunami-forecasting models, communications systems, and detection technologies.

The center operates continuously, with two watchstanders on duty at all times. Activity is detected through an automated alarm system triggered by several conditions:

- Sustained, strong oscillatory motion at individual seismometers.
- Detection of multiple seismic arrivals across global networks within a defined time window.
- Activation by a real-time seismic processing system when an earthquake exceeds a predetermined magnitude threshold for various regions throughout the world.
- Deep ocean tsunami sensor detection of an event.

== Alert levels ==
NTWC Tsunami Messages
Alert Level	Potential Hazard	Public Action
Warning	Dangerous coastal flooding and powerful currents	Move to high ground or inland
Advisory	Strong currents and waves dangerous to those in or very near water	Stay out of water, away from beaches and waterways
Watch	Not yet known	Stay tuned for more information, be prepared to act
Information	No threat or very distant event for which hazard has not yet been determined	No action needed at this time

== Deep-ocean tsunami detection ==
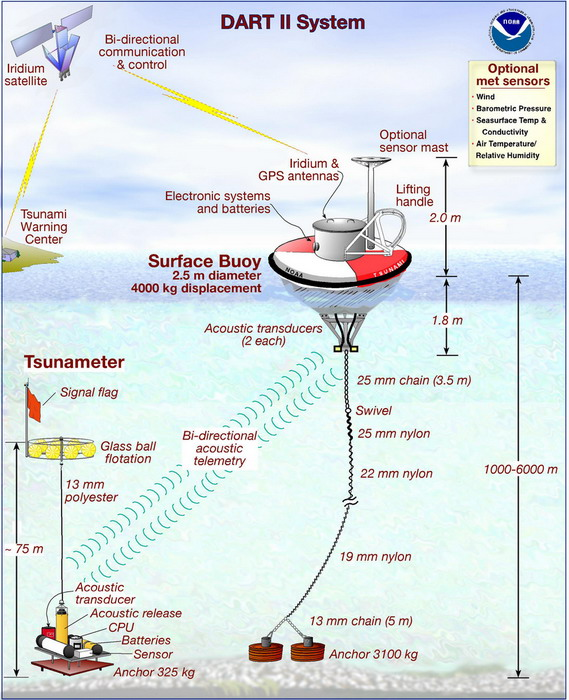
A diagram of the DART II system

In 1995, NOAA began developing the Deep-ocean Assessment and Reporting of Tsunamis (DART) system. By 2001, an array of six stations had been deployed in the Pacific Ocean.

Beginning in 2005, as a result of the tsunami caused by the 2004 Indian Ocean earthquake, plans were announced to add 32 more DART buoys to be operational by mid-2007.

These stations give detailed information about tsunamis while they are still far off shore. Each station consists of a sea-bed bottom pressure recorder (at a depth of 1000–6000 m) which detects the passage of a tsunami and transmits the data to a surface buoy via acoustic modem. The surface buoy then radios the information to the NTWC via the GOES satellite system. The bottom pressure recorder lasts for two years while the surface buoy is replaced every year. The system has considerably improved the forecasting and warning of tsunamis in the Pacific Ocean.

== See also ==
- Pacific Tsunami Warning Center, the other warning center in the U.S.
