= National Data Buoy Center =

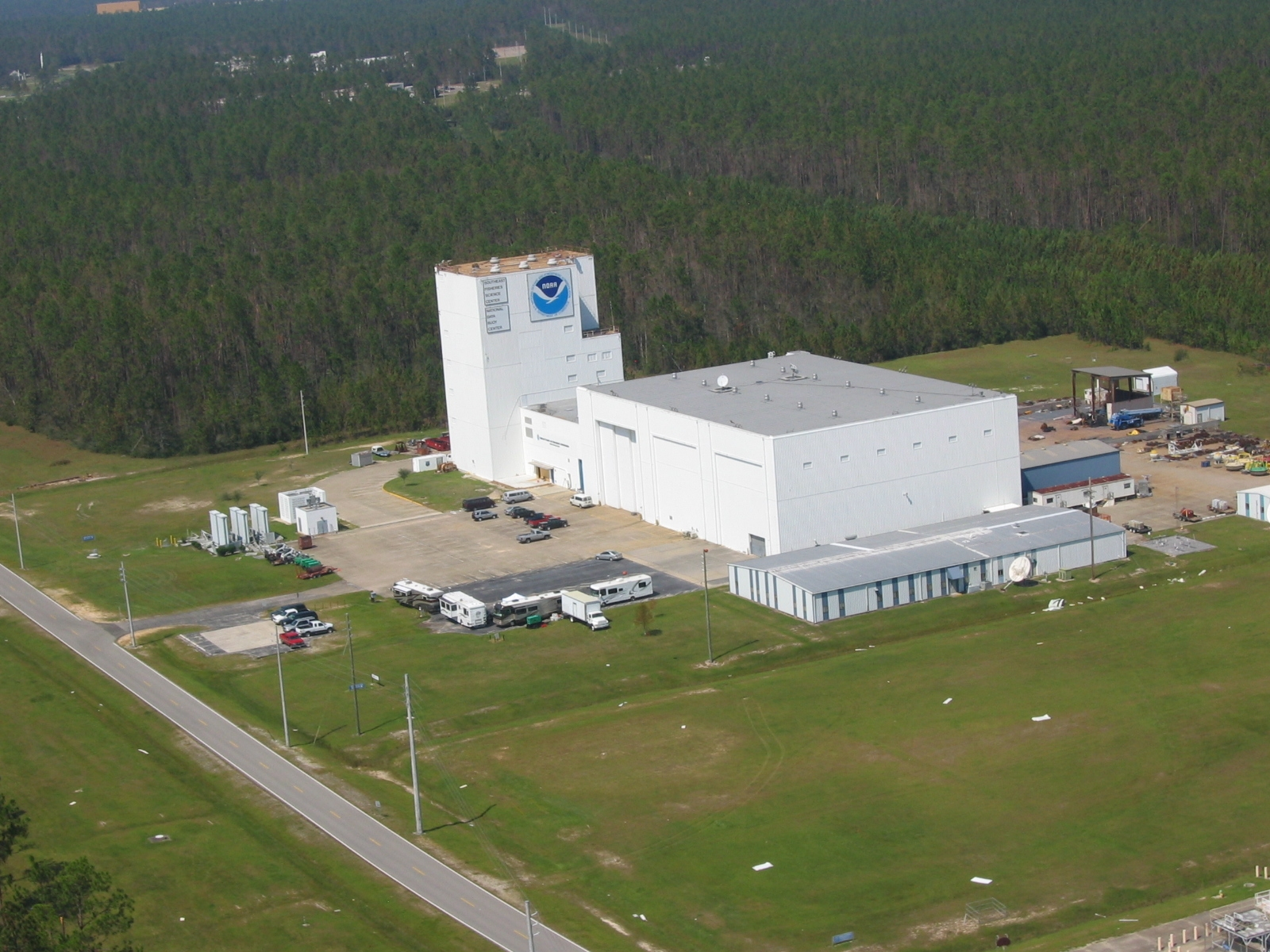
- Established: 1960 (66 years ago)
- Coordinates: 30°21′24″N 89°36′42″W
- Parent organisations: National Oceanic and Atmospheric Administration
- Website: www.ndbc.noaa.gov

The National Data Buoy Center (NDBC) is a part of the National Oceanic and Atmospheric Administration's (NOAA) National Weather Service (NWS). NDBC designs, develops, operates, and maintains a network of data collecting buoys and coastal stations. The NDBC is located in southern Mississippi as a tenant at the John C. Stennis Space Center, a National Aeronautics and Space Administration (NASA) facility.

== Operations ==
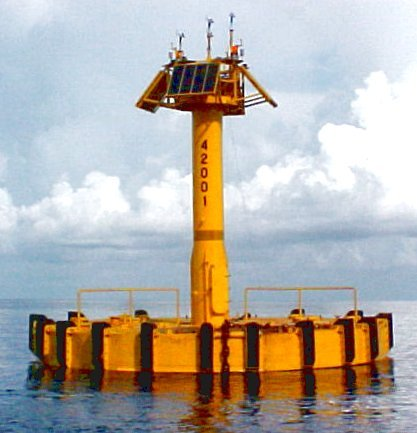
A typical deep-sea NDBC discus buoy in the Gulf of Mexico

NDBC employs engineers, meteorologists, oceanographers, computer scientists, and other professionals.

NDBC provides hourly observations from a network of about 90 buoys and 60 Coastal Marine Automated Network (C-MAN) stations to help meet these needs. All stations measure wind speed, direction, and gust; atmospheric pressure; and air temperature. In addition, all buoy stations, and some C-MAN stations, measure sea surface temperature and wave height and period. Conductivity and water current are measured at selected stations.

A new task is the operation of the DART (Deep-ocean Assessment and Reporting of Tsunamis) buoys. DART is a fleet of tsunami detecting buoys.

Another task adopted in 2005 is TAO (Tropical Atmosphere Ocean project) buoys. TAO is a fleet of over 50 buoys moored in the Pacific Ocean. These buoys are designed to help detect and predict El Niño and La Niña.

All buoys and many C-MAN stations located in offshore areas operate on marine batteries which are charged by solar cells. Sensors are calibrated in wind tunnels or environmental chambers, and later tested with the onboard station microprocessors, called payloads, on test stands at the outside sensor test facility. Final calibration and testing of the completed buoy systems are accomplished in the onsite canal. All buoys are serviced about every two years for routine maintenance and to install newly calibrated sensors.

The observations from moored buoys and C-MAN stations are transmitted hourly through NOAA Geostationary Operational Environmental Satellites (GOES) to a ground receiving facility at Wallops Island, Virginia, operated by the NOAA National Environmental Satellite, Data, and Information Service (NESDIS). Additionally, some buoys and C-MAN stations may use the Iridium satellite system to transmit data. The data is recorded and processed by the National Oceanographic Data Center.

Through a Memorandum of Agreement, the United States Coast Guard (USCG) remains a critically important partner to NDBC, supplying transportation for buoy deployments, retrievals, and other maintenance.

== History ==
The National Data Buoy Development Program (NDBDP), created in 1967, was placed under the control of the USCG.

In 1970, NOAA was formed and the NOAA Data Buoy Office (NDBO) was created within the National Ocean Service (NOS) and located in Mississippi. In 1982, the NDBO was renamed NDBC and was placed under NOAA's NWS.

The first buoys deployed by NDBC were the large 12-m discus hulls constructed of steel. These were generally deployed in deep water off the U.S. East Coast and in the Gulf of Mexico.

By 1979, 16 stations were deployed in the Pacific, 7 in the Atlantic, and 3 in the Gulf of Mexico. Eight more stations were deployed in the Great Lakes after 1979.

In 1995, development of the Deep-ocean Assessment and Reporting of Tsunamis (DART) system began, with deployment beginning in 2000. Following the 2004 Indian Ocean earthquake and its subsequent tsunamis, additional dart buoys were deployed.

== Location ==
NDBC's main office is located in southern Mississippi at the John C. Stennis Space Center, a National Aeronautics and Space Administration (NASA) facility. This site was chosen because it contains an excellent pre-existing industrial facility which is adjacent to a canal with deep-water access to the Gulf of Mexico. Other offices are located in Sterling, Virginia.

== See also ==
- Effects of global warming
