= Pacific Tsunami Warning Center =

Tsunami warning center on Ford Island, Hawaii, United States

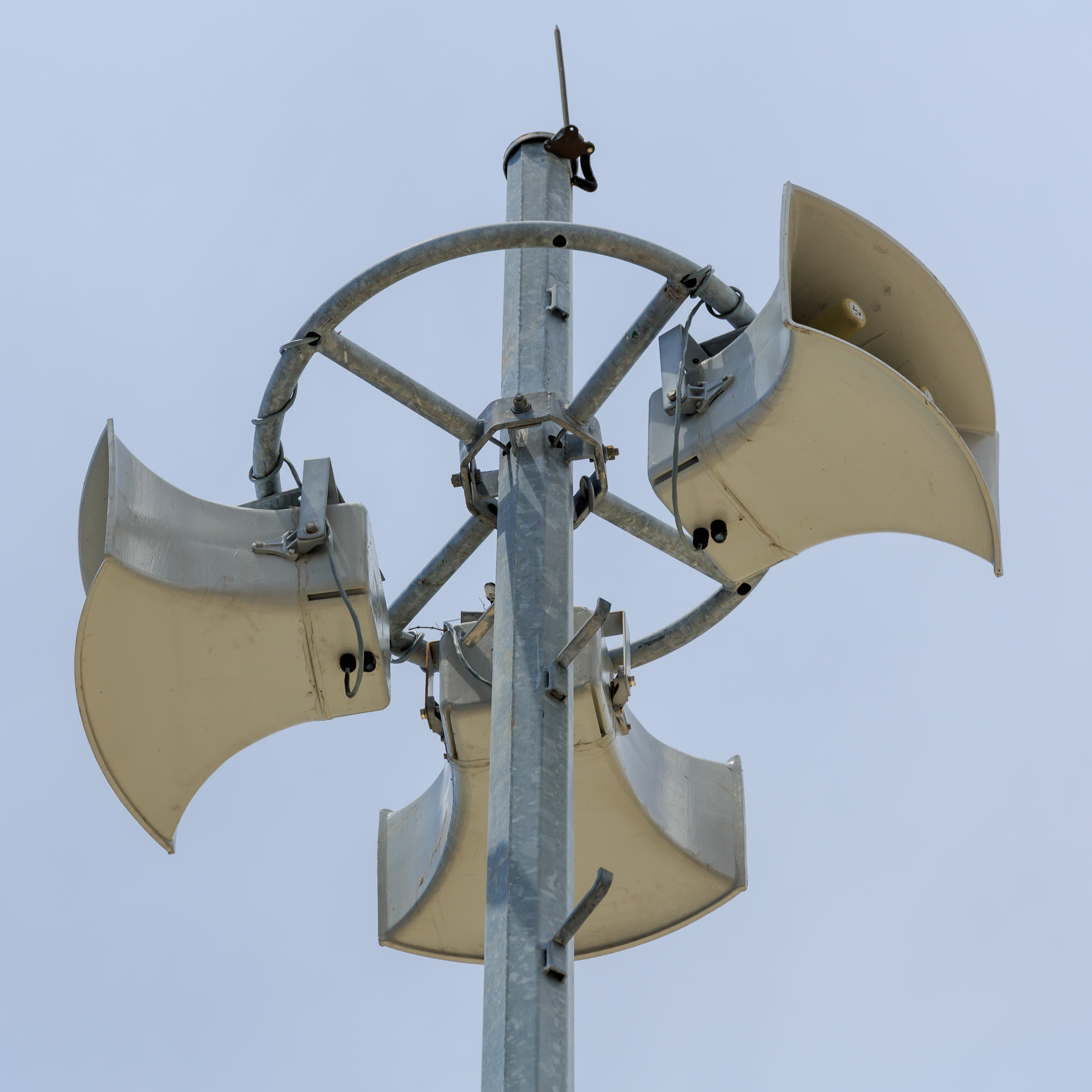
In some regions, tsunami sirens are used to help alert the public

The Pacific Tsunami Warning Center (PTWC), located on Ford Island, Hawaii, is one of two tsunami warning centers in the United States, covering Hawaii, Guam, American Samoa and the Northern Mariana Islands in the Pacific, as well as Puerto Rico, the U.S. Virgin Islands and the British Virgin Islands in the Caribbean Sea. Other parts of the United States are covered by the National Tsunami Warning Center.

PTWC is also the operational center of the Pacific Tsunami Warning System and issued tsunami warnings for dozens of countries from 1965 to 2014. In October 2014, the authority to issue tsunami warnings was delegated to individual member states. As a result, the center now issues advice rather than official warnings for non-U.S. coastlines, with the exception of the British Virgin Islands.

The PTWC uses seismic data as its starting point, but then takes into account oceanographic data when calculating possible threats. Tide gauges in the area of the earthquake are checked to establish if a tsunami has formed. The center then forecasts the future of the tsunami.

== History ==
Up until the late 1940s, the United States had no way to warn the public about tsunami threats. After the 1946 Aleutian Islands earthquake, which generated a tsunami and killed more than 170 people in Hawaii, a plan was devised to warn the public of possible tsunami inundation. The facility became operational in 1948 and was called the Seismic Sea Wave Warning System (SSWWS), headquartered at the Coast and Geodetic Survey's seismological observatory in Honolulu, Hawaii.

Initially, the Seismic Sea Wave Warning System covered only the Hawaiian Islands and was limited to teletsunamis (distant events), using data from 4 seismic stations and 9 tide gages. The 1960 Valdivia earthquake and tsunami, which killed thousands of people, led to the establishment of the Pacific Tsunami Warning System under the auspices of UNESCO's Intergovernmental Oceanographic Commission, with the Seismic Sea Wave Warning System as its operational center. As a result, the name of the facility was changed to the Pacific Tsunami Warning Center.

The expanded system became operational in April 1965 but, like its local predecessor, was limited to teletsunamis – tsunamis which are capable of causing damage far away from their source. The system covered all countries of the Pacific Ocean with data from 20 seismic stations around the world and 40 tide stations.

In the aftermath of the 1964 Alaska earthquake and tsunami, which killed 131 people, it was decided to create another warning system to provide timely warnings about local events for coastal areas of Alaska. After Congress approved funding in 1965, the Alaska Regional Tsunami Warning System was launched in September 1967 with observatories in Palmer, Adak and Sitka. At that time, PTWC ended its coverage of Alaska.

The 1975 Hawaii earthquake and tsunami, which killed several people, highlighted the threat of tsunamis caused by nearby events. As a result, PTWC began issuing tsunami warnings for local events near Hawaii.

In 1982, the Alaska Tsunami Warning Center's area of responsibility was enlarged to include California, Oregon and Washington, as well as British Columbia in Canada, but only for earthquakes in the vicinity of the West Coast. PTWC continued to provide coverage of teletsunamis. The Alaska center's responsibilities were expanded in 1996 to include all Pacific-wide sources, after which it became known as the West Coast/Alaska Tsunami Warning Center (WCATWC). As a result, PTWC's area of responsibility was further reduced.

On December 1, 2001, the PTWC was re-dedicated as the Richard H. Hagemeyer Pacific Tsunami Warning Center, in honor of the former U.S. Tsunami Program Manager and National Weather Service Pacific Region Director who managed the center for many years.

In 2005, in the aftermath of the 2004 Indian Ocean earthquake and tsunami, the Pacific Tsunami Warning Center's responsibilities were expanded to include tsunami guidance for the Indian Ocean, the South China Sea and the Caribbean Sea, though its authority to issue warnings was limited to Puerto Rico and the U.S. Virgin Islands. For all other areas, the decision to issue tsunami warnings was left to individual countries.

The responsibility for Puerto Rico and the U.S. Virgin Islands was passed to the West Coast/Alaska Tsunami Warning Center in June 2007, while PTWC continued to issue advice for other parts of the Caribbean Sea. In 2013, the West Coast/Alaska Tsunami Warning Center became known as the National Tsunami Warning Center.

PTWC discontinued its messages for the Indian Ocean in 2013 after regional tsunami warning centers were opened in Australia, India and Indonesia.

In October 2014, the authority to issue official tsunami warnings for coastlines in the Pacific was delegated to individual member states. This happened because warnings and watches issued by PTWC caused confusion when they conflicted with a country's independently derived level of alert. As a result, the center now issues advice rather than official warnings for all non-U.S. coastlines, with the exception of the British Virgin Islands.

In 2015, the annual operating cost of the Pacific Tsunami Warning System was estimated to be between 50 and 80 million U.S. dollars.

In April 2017, the responsibility for Puerto Rico and the U.S. Virgin Islands returned to PTWC, along with the British Virgin Islands, to consolidate Caribbean responsibilities under one warning center.

As of 2023, the Pacific Tsunami Warning System has access to about 600 high-quality seismic stations around the world and about 500 coastal and deep-ocean sea level stations. It has 46 member states: Brunei, Cambodia, Canada, Chile (including Easter Island and the Juan Fernández Islands), China (which is considered to include Hong Kong and Macau), Colombia, Costa Rica, East Timor, North Korea, Ecuador (including the Galapagos Islands), El Salvador, Guatemala, Honduras, Indonesia, Japan, Malaysia, Mexico, Nicaragua, Panama, Peru, Philippines, South Korea, Russia, Singapore, Thailand, United States (including Guam, Northern Mariana Islands, and the Minor Outlying Islands), Vietnam, Australia (including Norfolk Island), Cook Islands, Fiji, France (including French Polynesia, New Caledonia and Wallis and Futuna), Kiribati (including the Gilbert Islands, the Phoenix Islands and Kiritimati), the Marshall Islands (including Kwajalein Atoll and Majuro), the Federated States of Micronesia, Nauru, New Zealand (including the Kermadec Islands), Niue, Palau, Papua New Guinea, Samoa, the Solomon Islands, Tokelau, Tonga, Tuvalu, the United Kingdom (including the Pitcairn Islands), and Vanuatu.

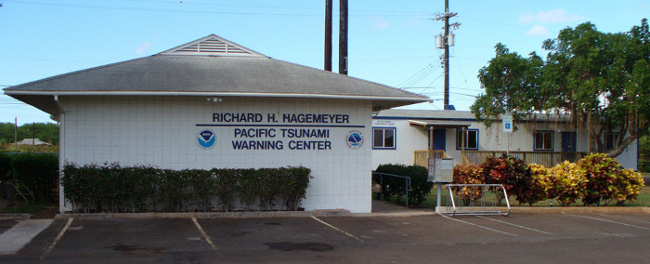
Pacific Tsunami Warning Center in Hawaii

== Coverage area ==
Status	Regions
Tsunami warning authority	Hawaii, American Samoa, Guam, Northern Mariana Islands, Puerto Rico, U.S. Virgin Islands, British Virgin Islands
Guidance only	All other parts of the Pacific Ocean and the Caribbean Sea
Discontinued	Indian Ocean (2005–2013), South China Sea

== Alert levels ==
Official tsunami warnings and watches are limited to U.S. coastlines, with the exception of the British Virgin Islands. PTWC messages for other regions do not include alerts, but rather advice, as the authority to issue tsunami warnings was delegated to member states in 2014 to avoid confusion among the public.

=== Current format ===
U.S. Tsunami Messages (2014–present)
Alert Level	Potential Hazard	Public Action
Warning	Dangerous coastal flooding and powerful currents	Move to high ground or inland
Advisory	Strong currents and waves dangerous to those in or very near water	Stay out of water, away from beaches and waterways
Watch	Not yet known	Stay tuned for more information, be prepared to act
Information	No threat or very distant event for which hazard has not yet been determined	No action needed at this time

International Tsunami Messages (2014–present)
Alert Level	Potential Hazard	Public Action
Threat	Dangerous coastal flooding and/or strong and unusual currents dangerous to those in or very near the water	Seek more information, follow instructions from national and local authorities
Information	Minor waves at most	No action suggested other than normal caution around the sea

=== Old format (before 2014) ===
The alert levels below were retired on October 1, 2014.

Pacific Ocean excluding Hawaii
Alert Level	Description
Warning	Widespread, dangerous coastal flooding accompanied by powerful currents are possible
Watch	An event may impact the watch area at a later time
Information	Earthquake notification. In some cases it may caution about the possibility of a local tsunami

Hawaii
Alert Level	Description
Warning	Widespread, dangerous coastal flooding accompanied by powerful currents are possible
Watch	An event may impact the watch area at a later time
Advisory	Strong currents or waves are possible
Information	Earthquake notification. In some cases it may caution about the possibility of a local tsunami

Indian Ocean and the Caribbean Sea
Alert Level	Description
Watch	Destructive tsunami possible
Information	Earthquake notification. In some cases it may caution about the possibility of a local tsunami

=== Distribution ===
Local populations in the United States of America receive tsunami information through radio and television receivers connected to the Emergency Alert System, and in some places (such as Hawaii) civil defense sirens and roving loudspeaker broadcasts from police vehicles. The public can subscribe to the RSS feed or email alerts from the PTWC web site, and the UNESCO site. Email and text messages are also available from the USGS Earthquake Notification Service which includes tsunami alerts.

== Deep-ocean tsunami detection ==
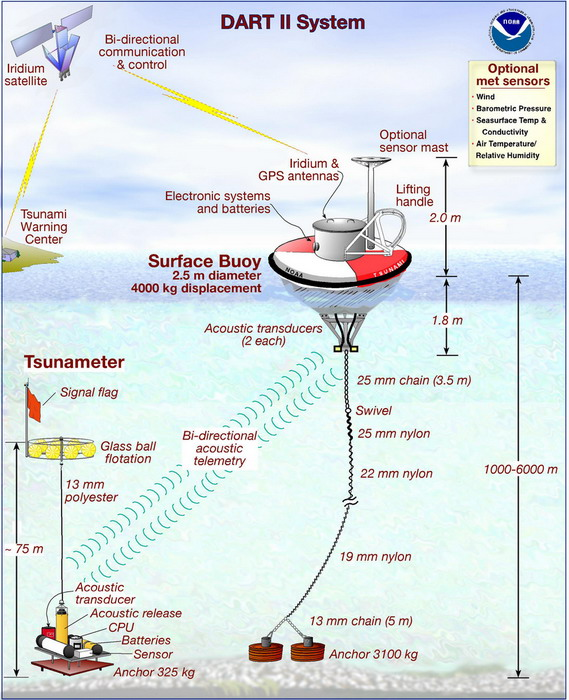
A diagram of the DART II system

In 1995, NOAA began developing the Deep-ocean Assessment and Reporting of Tsunamis (DART) system. By 2001, an array of six stations had been deployed in the Pacific Ocean.

Beginning in 2005, as a result of the tsunami caused by the 2004 Indian Ocean earthquake, plans were announced to add 32 more DART buoys to be operational by mid-2007.

These stations give detailed information about tsunamis while they are still far off shore. Each station consists of a sea-bed bottom pressure recorder (at a depth of 1000–6000 m) which detects the passage of a tsunami and transmits the data to a surface buoy via acoustic modem. The surface buoy then radios the information to the PTWC via the GOES satellite system. The bottom pressure recorder lasts for two years while the surface buoy is replaced every year. The system has considerably improved the forecasting and warning of tsunamis in the Pacific Ocean.
